= Media in Syria =

Media in Syria encompasses the country’s newspapers, television and radio broadcasters, film industry, and online and social-media. The Syrian media landscape was defined by extensive state control and censorship under the Assad government. Since its fall in December 2024, Syria's media is in a transitional period in which its media institutions and legal environment continue to evolve.

The national language of Syria is Arabic but some publications and broadcasts are also disseminated in English and French.

While television was the most popular medium in Ba'athist Syria, the Internet became a widely utilized vehicle to disseminate content by 2013. In addition to its control of domestic media, the Ba'athist state also sought to control what Syrians saw by restricting coverage from outside sources. Publications and broadcasts were monitored by members of the government. All mass media outlets were under the supervision of the Ministry of Information. Third article of the 2013 Information Ministry guidelines stipulated that the purpose of all media outlets was "to enlighten public opinion" in line with the ideological doctrines "of the Arab Socialist Ba’ath Party and the policy of the state".

Following Ba'ath party's capture of power in 1963, the state immediately banned all news outlets except which advanced party propaganda. Syrians have had no exposure to free media or independent press since then, with there being no space for independent journalism, newspapers, publications, journalists or websites un-affiliated with party organizations. The situation worsened further after 1970, with the Ba'athist dictatorship imposing additional censorship policies that furthered its totalitarian control of the society until the Syrian Revolution erupts across Syria which began on 15 March 2011 until the dictator Bashar al-Assad and his family are overthrown on 8 December 2024 with the Fall of Damascus to the government rebels which led the Assad family left Syria at midnight for Russia which landed in Moscow for a political asylum as refuge. State propaganda machine was primarily used to monopolise information access and indoctrinate the Syrian population in Ba'athist ideology.

Ba'athist Syria was one of the most dangerous places in the world for journalists and was ranked 2nd worst in the World Press Freedom Index in 2024. There were 28 journalists killed in combat in 2012. Between 2011 and 2020, more than 700 civilian journalists have been killed in Syria and an estimated 78% of these killings were perpetrated by Ba'athist forces. More than 400 journalists were arrested or kidnapped in the course of the Syrian civil war. More than a third of independent journalists reporting on the war were forced to flee after Assad regime's capture of territories in Southern and Eastern Syria during 2016-2018. During the early years of the Syrian revolution, there was a mass flight of local journalists due to persecution, threats, harassment, torture, executions and kidnappings from Ba'athist and pro-Assad militias. Ba'athist Syria had numerous laws such as "1965 law of protection against the revolution", "2011 media law", "2012 terrorism law", "2021 cybercrime law" which enabled the state to formally indict journalists and give a legal cover to media censorship.

== Mass media in Ba'athist Syria ==
=== Media ===
Public media journalists in Ba'athist Syria practiced self-censorship. Public media consisted of television, print, film, radio and internet and social media.

==== Print ====
According to Human Rights Watch, The Syrian Arab Establishment for Distribution of Printed Products, which was affiliated with the Ministry of Information, vetted all newspapers prior to distribution. The only two private daily newspapers covering political topics that have succeeded in staying open are owned by businessmen closely tied to the Ba'athist regime: Baladna and Al-Watan. Al-Watan, a private daily formerly published by businessman Rami Makhlouf, Bashar al-Assad's cousin, was launched in 2006. United Group, a major advertising group owned by Majd Suleiman, son of a former senior intelligence officer (Bahjat Suleiman), owns and operated the private daily Baladna.

Other Ba'athist and semi-official pro-Assadist private prints were permitted to be published in Ba'athist Syria such as dailies: Al-Thawra, Tishreen, Al-Ba'ath and Al-Iqtissadiya.

==== Television ====
There was one main broadcaster for both television and radio called the General Organization of Radio and Television of Syria (ORTAS). It was founded in 1960 and was based in Damascus. The channel had programs in Arabic, English and French. TV was the most popular media in Ba'athist Syria.

===== Satellite channels =====
- Al Aan TV
- Addounia TV
- Arrai TV
- Cham TV
- Massaya TV
- Lana TV
- Sama TV
- Spacetoon
- General Authority for Radio and Television
  - Noor Al-Sham
  - Al-Souriya TV
  - Syrian Drama TV
  - Syrian Education TV
  - Syrian Medical TV
  - Syrian News Channel
  - Talaqie TV

===== Terrestrial channels =====
- Channel 1 (Terrestrial, with Arabic focus), shut down in 2012.
- Channel 2 (Terrestrial, with sport, family and health focus including regional variants), shut down in 2012.

==== Newspapers ====
- Al-Ba'ath
- Al-Thawra
- Tishreen
- Syria Times (e-newspaper)
- Al-Watan
- Baladna
- Al-Iqtissadiya

==== Film ====
The Syrian film industry was state-run by the Ministry of Culture, which controlled production through the National Organization for Cinema. The industry largely propaganda based, focusing on Ba'athist Syria's successes in agriculture, health, transportation and infrastructure.

==== Radio ====
First radio service began in 1941 in Syria. As of 2012, there were over 4 million radios in Syria. They tended to broadcast music, ads and stories relating to culture.

- Syrian Arab Republic Radio
- Alaan FM: launched in October 2012 broadcasting live from the UAE.
- FARAH FM
- Al-Madina FM: Syria's first private radio station

==== Online ====
Providing hosting services is a violation of United States sanctions. Ba'athist Syrian government websites, news agencies and online news services based in or targeted at Syria, several of which launched during the Syrian civil war, included:

- Syrian Arab News Agency (SANA)
- Al-Masdar News, a pro-Assadist newsoutlet. Shut down in 2021.
- Al-Watan, an online edition of Damascus-based Al-Watan newspaper, the 33rd most visited website for 2010 in the MENA region.
- SUNA news agency, an online news platform focused on Syria.
- Click News Syria, an online news service and a special media blog focused on Syria.
- Snack Syrian, an online news service focused on Syria.
- Q Street Journal, an online news service, online radio and a special media blog focused on Syria. Broadcasting from Dubai, UAE.
- ARA News, an online news service focussed on the consequences of war in Syria and Iraq, ceased operation in 2017.
- Syria-News, an Arabic language online press agency intended to report news about Syria.
- Syria NewsDesk, a Beirut-based Arabic news agency, focussed on the ordeal of the Syrian population, supported by the Dutch foundation "Free Press Unlimited".

=== Pro-opposition media ===
The public did have access to Western and Middle Eastern radio stations and satellite TV, and Qatar-based Al Jazeera became very popular in Ba'athist Syria. In August 2012, a media centre utilized by foreign reporters in Azaz was targeted by the Syrian Air Force in an airstrike on a civilian area during Ramadan.

==== Television ====
There are also satellite stations which broadcast from outside of Syria. Two of the primary satellite networks, Eutelsat and Nilesat, expressed frustrations over the Syrian government preventing satellite TV transmission broadcast from international outlets.

==== Satellite channels ====
- Orient TV, based in Istanbul, Turkey. Announced on 21 November 2023, definitive closure on 1 January 2024.
- Aleppo Today, based in Istanbul, Turkey
- Syria TV (Fadaat Media), based in Istanbul, Turkey. Part of the Qatari pro-Muslim Brotherhood Al Araby TV Network.

==== Press ====
- Enab Baladi, based in Istanbul, Turkey. Announced closure on 23 November 2023, but was reestablished in Damascus.
- Al-Ahd (The Vow): published by the Syrian Muslim Brotherhood
- Qasioun News Agency: news agency licensed in Turkey, based in Gaziantep.
- Shaam News Network, an activist news organization, privately financed. Each 16-page edition includes coverage of culture, translation from foreign news sources and cartoons.

==== Radio ====
Pro-Turkish

- Watan FM (from Istanbul, Turkey)

==== Internet and social media ====
With the breakdown of many traditional media outlets during the civil war, much of the current events are reported by individuals on Facebook and Twitter. However, the reliability of such reports can in many cases not be independently verified by credible news agencies. While many websites have appeared and publish a pro-opposition alternative to pro-government media, the lack of robust journalistic standards has often benefited the government since correctly denying news reports gives them more credibility.

- Raqqa Is Being Slaughtered Silently : Citizen journalism effort exposing human rights abuses by ISIS forces occupying the northern Syrian city of Raqqa.
- Rojava Information Center: Journalism from the Autonomous Administration of North and East Syria.
- ANF News (Kurdish: Ajansa Nûçeyan a Firatê), a Netherlands-based multilingual online news service.
- Hawar News Agency (sometimes abbreviated ANHA) (Arabic: وكالة أنباء هاوار) is an online Kurdish news service based in Al-Hasaka, Syria, said to be linked to the SDF.
- Ekurd.net, an English language online newspaper for Kurds since January 2015, based in New York. The editorial team is known, though its owners are not.
- Orient Net, an Istanbul-based Arabic and English language online newspaper concerned with Syrian affairs. Announced on 21 November 2023, definitive closure on 1 January 2024.
- Horan Free League, standing for "Syrian Revolution" in Hauran region
- SMART News Agency, standing for "Syrian Media Action Revolution Team", a France-based Arabic language opposition media network. Shut down in 2020.

=== Prohibitive measures against media ===
==== State of Emergency law ====
The constitution of the Syrian Arab Republic guaranteed the right to a free press and freedom of expression, but Syria was under a highly restrictive state of emergency law since the Ba'ath Party came to power in 1964 until 2011. Anyone wishing to establish an independent paper or periodical must apply for a license from the Ministry of Information. In 2011 the state of emergency was lifted. This seems to have had no effect what-so-ever on the way the government conducted itself regarding the media, with Syria's ranking actually worsening the following year with journalistic organizations such as the Committee to Protect Journalists, and Reporters Without Borders both ranking Syria as one of the top four most repressive countries in the world.

In April 2009, Syrian Kurdish journalist Faruq Haji Mustafa was arrested by the Ba'athist secret police and has never been heard from again.

==== Internet censorship ====
In 2012, there were over 5 million Internet users in Syria. Reporters Without Borders listed Ba'athist Syria as an “internet enemy” due to high levels of censorship. The Internet was controlled by the Syrian Computer Society (SCS) and the Syrian Telecommunications Establishment (STE). The Assad regime monitored activity through the hacking of emails and social networking accounts and phishing. Simultaneously, the government released pro-Assad propaganda and engaged in disinformation campaigns to support its cause. Ba'athist Syria's penal law required Internet cafes to record all comments in the online chatrooms. There was a two-day Internet blackout in 2012, which was orchestrated by the Assad regime. Ba'athist authorities constantly blocked journalists and bloggers from attending and reporting on events by arresting and torturing them. This was not limited to Syrian journalists as several foreign journalists, such as the members of the Associated Press and Reuters, were also arrested and expelled from the country over their reporting.

==== Press freedom ====
Reporters Without Borders ranked Ba'athist Syria 179th out of 180 countries in the world on its 2024 Press Freedom Index. On the Press Freedom Barometer for 2022, the organization reported that one journalist had been killed, while 27 journalists and two media workers had been imprisoned.

== Transitional period after the fall of Assad ==
More than a year after the fall of Assad in December 2024, Syria’s media landscape remains in transition. State broadcasting has resumed under the new authorities, while exiled and opposition outlets have gained greater access inside the country and foreign journalists have returned in larger numbers. The government has also begun consultations on a new media law covering broadcasters, news agencies, digital platforms and social media. Press freedom groups have called for the law to guarantee editorial independence, establish an independent regulator, protect confidential sources and prevent journalists from being detained because of their work. Despite the wider opening, serious concerns remain. Journalists have continued to face detention under Assad-era laws and restrictions have been imposed on several categories of content. Political instability, weak legal and regulatory frameworks, poor infrastructure, limited funding and low public trust present major challenges. Syria remained near the bottom of the 2025 World Press Freedom Index at 177th out of 180 countries, but its ranking improved significantly to 141th place in 2026.

== See also ==
- Cinema of Syria
- List of newspapers in Syria
- List of radio stations in Syria
- List of Syrian films
- Syrian Revolution
- Syrian Civil War
- Fall of Damascus
- Media coverage of the Syrian Civil War
- Telecommunications in Syria
- Television in Syria
