= Television in Syria =

Television in Syria was introduced on 23 July 1960 with the launch of Channel 1, during the period in which Syria and Egypt were united as the United Arab Republic.

Syrian television channels are predominantly owned and operated by the Syrian General Authority for Radio and Television (GART), which is affiliated with the Ministry of Information. The organization employs approximately 4,800 staff, including both government employees and freelancers.

Television in Syria is mainly received through free satellite and digital terrestrial.

== History ==
Prior to 1976, all television broadcasts were aired in black and white. In 1985 a second channel was established and in 1995 Syrian television rented a channel on Arabsat and it started broadcasting eight hours daily via satellite in 1996.

Since the start of the Syrian civil war in 2011, the state has been engaging in a "media war" to combat the criticisms broadcast from other popular media outlets viewed in the Arab world and internationally, such as Al Arabiya and Al Jazeera. In Ba'athist Syria television coverage championed the government against Syrian opposition islamist rebel forces such as Al-Nusra Front, Free Syrian Army and the Islamic Front. According to BBC Arabic, it also tended to omit or downplay reports of civilian casualties in its coverage of confrontations with what the Assadist government labeled as terrorist groups. The Arab League officially asked the satellite operators Arabsat and Nilesat to stop broadcasting Syrian media in June 2012. On 27 April 2013, Al Jazeera Media Network announced that it was suspending indefinitely its activities throughout Syria because of alleged intimidation and threats against its staff.

The collapse of Ba'athist and Assad family rule on 8 December 2024 brought challenges to the media landscape in Syria as it is unclear whether the new Islamist-led Syrian government would relax censorship and allow more press freedom.

== National networks ==
Channel name	Owner/parent company	Launched	Broadcast hours	Aspect ratio	Notes
Aleppo Today	Aleppo Today Channel	1 December 2011	24 hours	16:9 HDTV
Alyaum TV	Orbit Communications (original); OSN (current)	27 October 2003		16:9 HDTV
Syria TV	Fadaat Media	March 2018	24 hours	16:9 HDTV
Al Thania TV	Fadaat Media	February 2025		16:9 HDTV	Sister network to Syria TV.
Radio Damascus	GART	4 February 2026	24 hours	16:9 HDTV	TV broadcast started on 4 February 2026
Al-Souriya TV	GART	1995 (original); 19 February 2026 (current form)	24 hours	16:9 HDTV	Relaunched in 2026. Also on digital and satellite.
Syrian News Channel	GART	15 December 2010 (original); 5 May 2025 (current form)	24 hours	16:9 HDTV	Relaunched in 2025. Also on digital and satellite.
Ana Sooria		2025		16:9 HDTV
Syria One		2025		16:9 HDTV
Massaya TV		1 May 2007		16:9 HDTV
Prime TV		8 December 2025		16:9 HDTV	Official broadcaster of the Syrian Prime Premier League
Sham TV	Mohammad Akram Al-Jundi	2005		16:9 HDTV	First private satellite channel in Syria.
Suboro TV	Syriac Orthodox Church	25 March 2019		16:9 HDTV	Classical Syriac / Turoyo -language TV channel that broadcasts religious topics.
Ronahî TV		20 October 2011		16:9 HDTV	First Kurdish-language TV network to operate in Syria.
Rojava TV		19 July 2017		16:9 HDTV	Kurdish-language TV channel.
Welat TV		2024		16:9 HDTV	Kurdish-language TV channel.

== Former channels ==
=== Suspended channels ===
Channel name	Owner/parent company	Launched	Suspended	Reason of suspension
Noor Al-Sham	ORTAS (GART)	31 July 2011	8 December 2024	Fall of the Assad regime.
Syrian Drama TV	ORTAS (GART)	20 August 2009	8 December 2024	Fall of the Assad regime.
Syrian Education TV	ORTAS (GART)	14 October 2008	8 December 2024	Fall of the Assad regime.
Sama TV		24 January 2013	8 December 2024	Inactive.
Drama 24	ORTAS (GART)		8 December 2024	Fall of the Assad regime.
Sakaker Kids TV	ORTAS (GART)		8 December 2024	Fall of the Assad regime.
Sports TV	ORTAS (GART)		8 December 2024	Fall of the Assad regime.
Syrian Local Channel	ORTAS (GART)	2022	8 December 2024	Fall of the Assad regime.

==== Former ====
Channel name	Owner/parent company	Launched	Closed	Notes
Channel 1	General Organization of Radio and TV	23 July 1960	11 November 2012
Channel 2	General Organization of Radio and TV	13 March 1985	11 November 2012
Manbij TV		Unknown	Unknown	Kurdish-language channel
Nosor TV		Unknown	Unknown
Syria Baladna		Unknown	Unknown
Al-Jisr TV		Unknown	Unknown
Addounia TV	Rami Makhlouf	23 March 2007	2015 or 2024
Arrai TV	Misha'an al-Juburi	2007	4 December 2011
Orient News	Ghassan Aboud	February 2009	21 November 2023
Syrian Medical TV	ORTAS	Unknown	2016
Talaqie TV	ORTAS	6 October 2012	17 October 2016
Spacetoon	Spacetoon International	15 March 2000	Unknown
Suriya al-Ghad		2011	2022
Syria al-Shaab		July 2011	Unknown

== See also ==
- Lists of television channels
