= List of radio stations in Syria =

Radio broadcasting in Syria began shortly after independence in 1946, with the launch of Radio Damascus in 1947 as the country's first national radio service. For decades, the sector operated under a state monopoly administered by the General Authority for Radio and Television (GART, then ORTAS), which oversees public radio and television services under the Ministry of Information.

Since the mid-2000s, a limited number of privately owned FM stations have been licensed, primarily focusing on music and entertainment programming, while news broadcasting remains largely dominated by state-run outlets. As of the 2020s, radio in Syria is transmitted mainly on the FM band, with services concentrated in major urban centers such as Damascus and Aleppo, alongside a smaller number of regional and community initiatives.

== Local stations ==
=== State-owned (GART) ===
Name	Website	Area served
Radio Damascus	damasradio.fm	

=== Others ===
Name	Website	Area served	Notes
Al-Madina FM	www.almadinafm.com		
Melody FM Syria	www.melodysyria.com		
Radio Arabesque FM	www.arabesquefm.com		
Al Aan FM	www.alaan.fm		
Sham FM	sham.fm		
Farah FM	farah.fm		
Fuse FM Syria	www.fusefmsouria.com		
Mix FM Syria	www.mixfmsyria.net		
Rotana Style FM	www.rotanastyle.com		
Version FM	versionfm.com	Damascus Governorate	
Ninar FM	ninar.net	Aleppo Governorate	
Sada FM Syria	sada-fm.com	Aleppo Governorate	
Radio 7la FM		Latakia Governorate	
Radio Swaida	www.swaida.com/radio/	Sweida Governorate	
Radio Rayan	www.rayanfm.com/radio	Sweida Governorate	
Shufi Mafi FM	shufimafi.com	Deir ez-Zor Governorate Raqqa Governorate	
Radio Fann FM	www.radiofann.com		Jordanian station, Syrian branch
Radio Orient	www.radioorient.com		Based in Beirut, Lebanon; shut down in 2021
Radio Free Syria	radiofreesyria.com		English-language web broadcast in Scotland, UK

Kurdish language

Name	Website	Notes
Arta FM	https://www.arta.fm/	
Radio One FM Syria Group	https://radio-onefm.com/	
Radio Fresh	http://fresh-syria.net/	Established October 2014 in Kafr Nabl, broadcasting from Idlib
Defunct
Watan FM	https://watan.fm/	Broadcast from Istanbul, Turkey
Radio Alwan FM		Broadcast from Istanbul, Turkey; shut down in December 2022
Al-Asemeh Radio FM	https://www.asima-online.net/	Shut down in December 2022
Rozana Radio	https://www.rozana.fm/en	Broadcast from Gaziantep, Turkey; shut down in December 2022
Hawa Smart FM		Broadcast from Gaziantep, Turkey; shut down in 2022
Radio Hara FM		Broadcast from Gaziantep, Turkey; shut down in 2022

Assyrian language

Name	Website	Notes
Assyrian Radio		
Al-Hob FM		Broadcast from Beirut and Istanbul
1983fm		Broadcasting from Babylona Radio

== See also ==
- Telecommunications in Syria
- Mass media in Syria
