= List of newspapers in Syria =

Newspapers were first published in Syria during the Ottoman era. The first newspaper published in the country was Hadiqat al-Akhbar, published in 1857 by Khalil al-Khuri. The number of the newspapers increased when the country was under French mandate.

The below is a list of newspapers in Syria.

== National political newspapers ==
- Tishreen, Official daily
- Al-Thawra Al-Souria, Official daily
- Al-Watan, Independent daily
- Syria Times, English language daily
- Baladna, Independent daily
- Enab Baladi, Independent weekly.

== Political parties' newspapers ==
- Al-Ba'ath, daily, official newspaper of the Ba'ath Party
- An Nour, weekly, official newspaper of the Syrian Communist Party (Unified), Yusef al-Faysal faction
- Sawt ash-Shaab, weekly, official newspaper of the Syrian Communist Party (Bakdash), Khaled Bakdash faction
- Al-Wahdawi, weekly, official newspaper of the Socialist Unionists Party

== Local newspapers ==
- Kassioun (Damascus)
- Al-Jamahir (Syrian newspaper) (Aleppo), daily (Note: Not to be confused with Al-Jamahir, a defunct Egyptian newspaper (1947-1955) or Sawt al-Jamahir from Iraq.)
- Al-Ouruba (Homs), daily
- Al-Wehda (Syrian newspaper) (Lattakia), daily
- Al-Jabal (Sweida), weekly
- Al-Fidaa (Hamah), daily
- Al-Furat (Syrian newspaper) (Deir ez-Zor), daily

== Specialist newspapers ==
- Al-Mawqef Al-Riadi, sports weekly
- Al-Iqtissadiya, economic weekly

== Restricted circulation newspapers ==
- Al-Ghad, student half-monthly, published by the National Union of Syrian Students
- Al-Maseera, published by the Revolutionary Youth Union

== Defunct newspapers ==
- Ad Domari, satirical weekly, lasted for 104 issues only, as it was closed by the authorities in July 2003.
- Al Alam, independent daily (1946–1950), issued by Al-Alam publishing house, which was owned by Izzat Husrieh
- AlifBa, published in Damascus between 1930 and 1950
- Al Qabas (Damascus), owned by Najeeb Al Rayes
- Nidal ash-Shaab, issued irregularly, the official newspaper of the Syrian Communist Party until 2001; the public sale of the newspaper was prohibited by the Syrian government, and it was delivered to party members only

== See also ==
- List of newspapers
