= Zaina Erhaim =

Syrian journalist and feminist

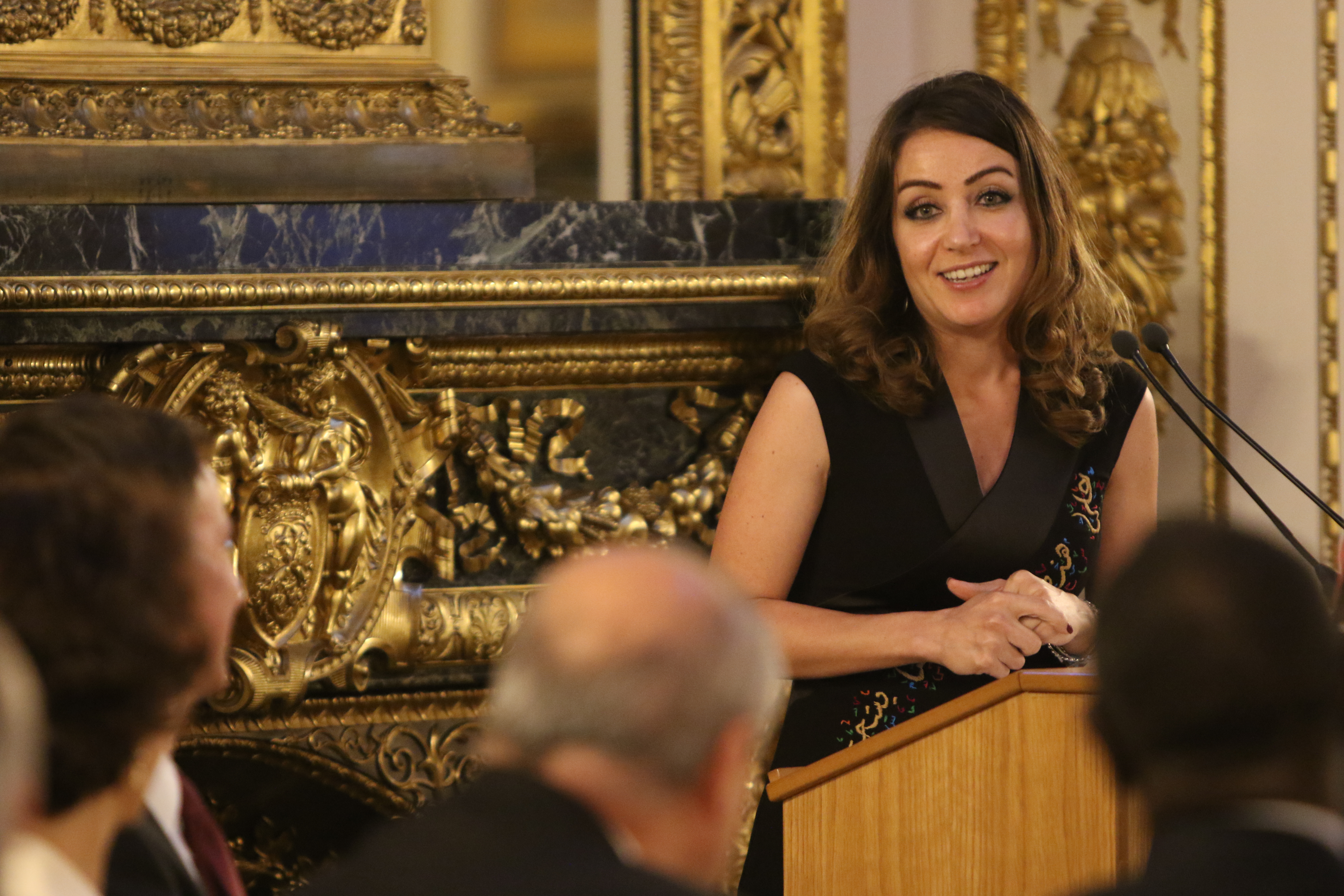
Speaking in the ministerial dinner in 2019

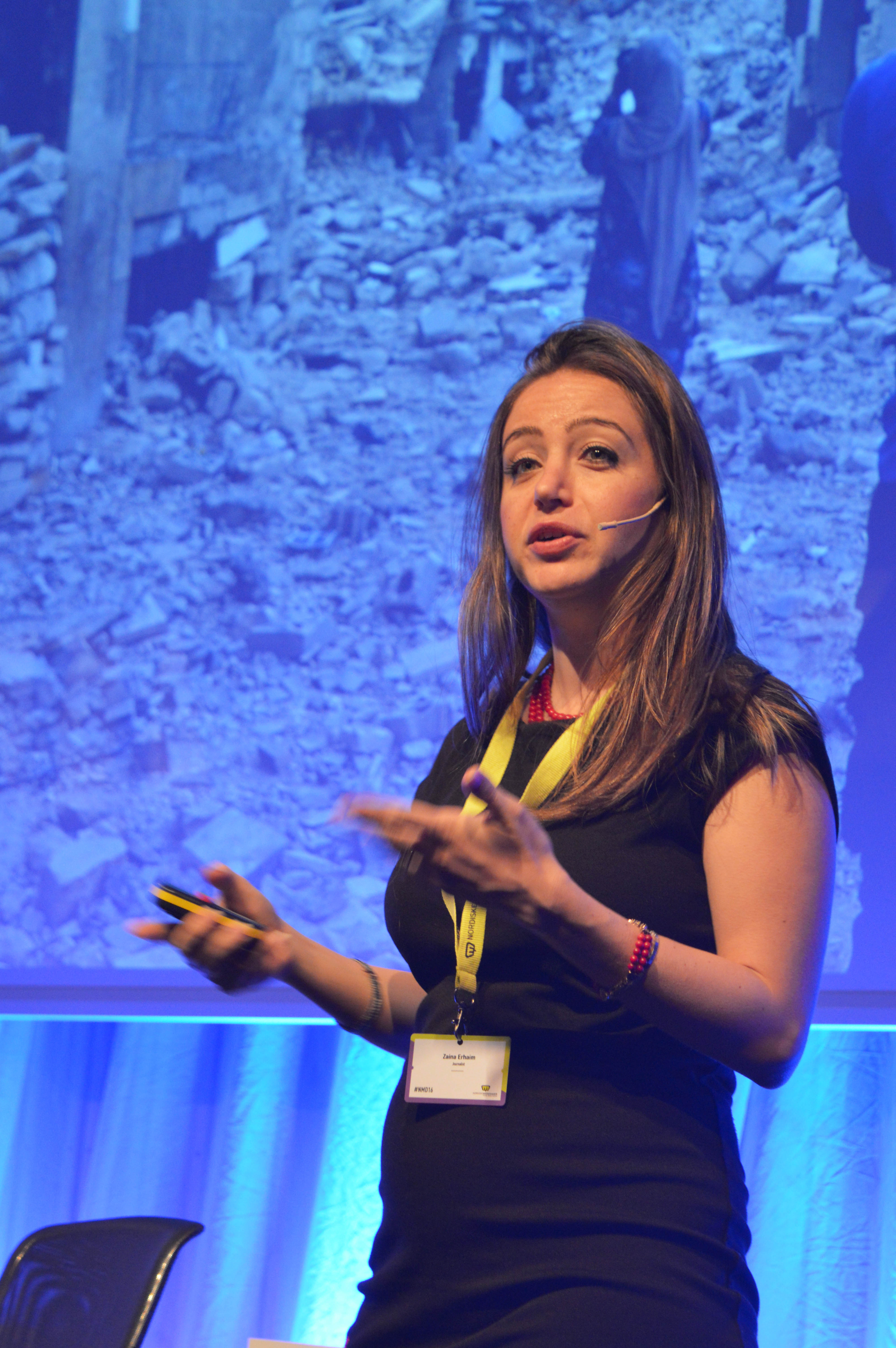
Erhaim speaks in 2016

Zaina Erhaim is a Syrian journalist, and feminist. She works as a communications consultant and trainer with international organisations in Syria, Iraq, Morocco, Libya, Lebanon and Egypt. She has reported on the Syrian civil war from within Syria. Erhaim was the Institute for War and Peace Reporting (IWPR)'s Communications Manager, she trained hundreds of people whilst in Syria to be citizen reporters, notably a large proportion of them women.

Zaina has more than a decade experience in the fields of journalism and communication. She recently founded Shams For Equity And Social Justice organisation to promote gender equity and advocates for equal rights for women and LGBTQ+ in MENA region.

Erhaim is the recipient of multiple international awards, named as one of: The world's most influential young Arabs by Arabian Business and one of the 5 Unsung heroes of 2016 by Reuters Thomson. Zaina won the Peter Mackler Award for Courageous and Ethical Journalism, Index on Censorship's Freedom of Expression Journalism Award, "Female Rebels Against The War" by WILPF Germany and Press Freedom Prize by Reporters Without Borders. She has contributed to The Economist, The Guardian, Newsweek, Middle East Eye, Orient TV, Al-Hayat and Syria-News.

Zaina also published chapters in three books: Our Women On The Ground, Arab Women Voicing New Realities, Journalism in Times of War.

== Biography ==
Erhaim was born in Idlib in northwestern Syria. She was educated in Damascus. In 2011, Erhaim pursued a master's degree in International Journalism from City, University of London on a Chevening scholarship; around the same time the Syrian civil war begun. Erhaim spent a year or two as a broadcast journalist with BBC Arabic Television before returning to Aleppo in 2013 in order to report on the situation there. Aleppo is the worst-hit city in the civil war, since the Battle of Aleppo began in 2012 it has been split between the government-held west and the rebel-held east. Reporting from within Syria, Erhaim has contributed to The Economist, The Guardian, Newsweek, Middle East Eye, Orient TV, Al-Hayat and Syria-News. As the Institute for War and Peace Reporting (IWPR)'s Syria project coordinator then, Erhaim also trained hundreds of citizen reporters in print and TV journalism whilst in Syria, notably including many women, to report "independently and accurately" on the civil war. She helped establish many of Syria's emerging independent newspapers and magazines. She fled Syria at the end 2015 and continues working as IWPR's as a communications manager, and she is now a refugee in the UK.

In 2015 a series of short documentary films directed by Erhaim, Syria's Rebellious Women, were first screened. The films were made over a period of 18 months in rebel-held parts of Aleppo. They tell the individual stories of a diverse group of women and the challenges facing them from the Syrian government's air force, the conservative traditions of a male-dominated society, and Islamic State of Iraq and the Levant.

In September 2016, upon arrival for a visit to the UK, Erhaim had her passport confiscated by border officials at the request of the Syrian government, who had declared it stolen. She was visiting to give a talk with Kate Adie about "how and why reporters take risks to get close to the action, and the vital role women can play in bringing truth to light" at the Write on Kew literary festival.

== Other activities ==
- The New Humanitarian, Member of the Board of Directors (2021–present)

== Awards ==
- 2011: Chevening Scholarship, Chevening Awards, Foreign and Commonwealth Office, London.
- 2015: Peter Mackler Award for Courageous and Ethical Journalism, Global Media Forum (Reporters Without Borders) and Agence France-Presse, National Press Club, Washington, DC.
- 2015: The journalist of the year, Press Freedom Prize by Reporters Without Borders.
- 2016: Freedom of Expression Journalism Award, Index on Censorship
- 2017: The 1st Anita-Augspurg for Woman Rebel Against War, Women International League for Peace and Freedom -Germany.

== Films ==
- Syria's Rebellious Women (2015)
- Syrian Diaries told by its women (2016)
- I Was Here (2017)
