= Jawad Abu Nassar =

Jawad Abu Nassar is a Palestinian child. In March 2026, when he was 21 months old, Abu Nassar's family alleged he was tortured while detained by the Israel Defense Forces.

== Detention ==
Jawad Abu Nassar was detained alongside his father, Osama Abu Nassar, 25, in central Gaza on 19 March 2026. Jawad was a toddler aged 21 months at the time.

The family reported that the child was tortured with burn and puncture marks on his legs. The IDF returned the child through the ICRC.

The New Arab reported that the child was tortured in front of his father to force the father to divulge information.

== Medical report ==
Dr Bisan Ahmed, who examined Jawad assessed that the marks on his legs were "consistent with deliberate cigarette burns used as a form of physical torture".
