= Al-Thawra Al-Souria (newspaper) =

Arabic language newspaper

Al-Thawra Al-Souria الثورة السورية
- Type: Daily newspaper
- Format: Compact
- Owner(s): Syrian Regional Branch of the Arab Socialist Ba'ath Party (until 2024); Ministry of Information (Syrian government)
- Publisher: Al Wahda Institution
- Editor-in-chief: Nour al-Din Ismail
- Founded: 1 July 1963; 62 years ago (original); 1 December 2025; 2 months ago (current form)
- Political alignment: Arab Socialist Ba'ath Party – Syria Region (formerly, until 2024)
- Language: Arabic
- Headquarters: Damascus, Syria
- Country: Syria
- Website: thawra.sy

Al-Thawra Al-Souria (Arabic: الثورة السورية, lit. 'The Syrian Revolution'), formerly known as Ath-Thawra (Arabic: الثورة, lit. 'The Revolution'), is a state-owned Arabic language newspaper formerly published by the Arab Socialist Ba'ath Party of Syria. After the fall of the Assad regime, the newspaper was relaunched in December 2025 under the Syrian transitional government.

Another newspaper with the same name was published by the Arab Socialist Ba'ath Party of Iraq but was disbanded during the invasion of Iraq in 2003 by the UK and US armies.

== History ==
Al Thawra was first published on 1 July 1963. It is the official newspaper of the Syrian government, and mostly covers governmental initiatives in the social and economic areas. There also other state-owned newspaper, namely Freedom, Al Baath and Syria Times.

Al-Thawra Al-Souria is based in Damascus. During the COVID-19 pandemic, former President Bashar al-Assad’s regime stopped printing daily newspapers due to rising printing costs and distribution challenges.

Al Wahda institution is the publisher of the daily in addition to Tishreen and Syria Times. After the fall of the Assad regime, the newspaper was relaunched on 1 December 2025, returning to print for the first time since 2020 as a modern platform combining print, digital, and interactive formats. Information Minister Hamza al-Mustafa said the relaunch marks Syria’s reclaimed voice after decades of censorship, calling it “a statement of presence and identity.”

== See also ==
- List of newspapers in Syria
