= Al Thania TV =

Syrian television network

- Type: Broadcasting drama, entertainment, news
- Country: Syria
- Broadcast area: Syria; Worldwide (via internet)

Programming
- Language: Arabic
- Picture format: HDTV

Ownership
- Owner: Fadaat Media
- Sister channels: Syria TV (Fadaat Media)

History
- Launched: February 2025

Links
- Website: www.althania.tv

Availability

Terrestrial
- Nilesat 201: 11938 V 30000 (5/6)

Streaming media
- Al Thania TV Live: Free

Al Thania TV (Arabic: قناة الثانية, romanized: Qanāt al-Thāniya, lit. 'Channel Two'), also Althania TV, is a Syrian general entertainment television channel owned and operated by the Qatari Fadaat Media network. It was launched in February 2025.

It broadcasts a variety of programs in Arabic, offering entertainment, cultural, heritage, and drama programming, as well as news bulletins. The channel states that its programming focuses on promoting Syrian cultural identity and values.

== Broadcasting ==
Al Thania TV broadcasts via satellite on Nilesat 201 (7.0° West) free-to-air (FTA), using the DVB-S standard. The channel also offers a live stream through its official website.

== See also ==
- Television in Syria
- List of Arabic-language television channels
