= Syria-News =

Syria-News is a privately-run online press agency intended to report news about Syria. The website is financed by businessman Firas Tlass. Its editor-in-chief is Nidal Maalouf [ar], head of the Syrian Economic Center.

Syria-News was launched in late 2003, at a time when most websites featuring political news about Syria were blocked in the country. This gave it a semi-official status, since it was approved by the Syrian government, and the participation of some ministers confirmed this status. The website became popular in Syria as an approved portal to discuss domestic issues.

In around 2011, after the outbreak of the Syrian civil war, the agency opened an office in Turkey and temporarily relocated there.

== Features ==
Syria-News features domestic, regional, political, and economic news, as well as reports and questionnaires on Syrian issues. It has a discussion feature which enables users to comment on most articles, as well to submit contributions, both subject to admin approval.

In 2004, following cooperation with the British Broadcasting Corporation, it launched ‘The place I live’, an area of the website to collect and forward public complaints to relevant government agencies and to publish officials' responses.

== Notable contributors ==
- Zaina Erhaim

== Web domain issues and changes ==
In 2006, the original official domain name of their website (www.syria-news.com) was hijacked, but soon later retaken. On February 18, 2008, all Syrian ISPs blocked domestic access to the site and its alternate URL (www.news-sy.com - occupied by another site as of 2024). Access was restored by March 6, 2008, though there was no official statement from the site or Syrian authorities.

As of 2024, the agency's domain is syria.news, and the original website is a redirect to that URL.

== See also ==
- Media of Syria
- Syrian Arab News Agency
