= General Authority for Radio and Television =

State-owned broadcaster of Syria

Coordinates: 33°30′44.4″N 36°16′32.2″E

- Native name: الهيئة العامة للإذاعة والتلفزيون (Arabic)
- Formerly: Organisation de la Radio et la Télévision Arabe Syrienne (ORTAS); Radio and Television (RTV Syria); Syrian Radio & Television (SRT)
- Industry: Broadcasting; Media
- Founded: 3 February 1947; 79 years ago (Radio); 23 July 1960; 66 years ago (Television); 1960; 66 years ago (Actual company)
- Headquarters: Umayyad Square, Damascus, Syria
- Area served: Worldwide
- Key people: Alaa Barsilo (Director)
- Products: TV shows; News; Web portals; Video production; Digital media
- Brands: Radio Damascus; Al-Souriya TV; Syrian News Channel
- Services: Broadcast, radio, television, Internet, and printing
- Owner: Government of Syria
- Website: rtv.gov.sy

The General Authority for Radio and Television (GART) (Arabic: الهيئة العامة للإذاعة والتلفزيون, romanized: al-Hayʾah al-ʿĀmmah li-l-Idhāʿah wa-al-Tilifizyūn) is the state-owned public broadcaster in Syria, reporting to the Ministry of Information.

It was previously known as the General Organization of Radio and TV (Arabic: الهيئة العامة للإذاعة والتلفزيون), also known in French as Organisation de la Radio et la Télévision Arabe Syrienne (in short ORTAS). Earlier names were Radio and Television (RTV Syria) and Syrian Radio & Television (SRT). For much of its existence, the organization was the Assad regime's propaganda tool until it was taken over by opposition groups in December 2024 amidst the fall of Damascus.

Several television channels and radio stations are being run by this organization, including Al-Souriya TV, Syrian News Channel and Radio Damascus. GART is an active member of the Arab States Broadcasting Union (ASBU), associate member of the European Broadcasting Union (EBU) and formerly a member of International Radio and Television Organisation (OIRT).

== History ==
The legal basis is a legislative decree from 2010, which, however, was largely not implemented. Sūmar Wassūf became head of the commission in December 2018.

Since the fall of the Assad regime, the radio and television channel has undergone reconstruction, and its programs have been suspended since December 2024, with a projected resumption in 2026.

Fifth logo used from March to October 2025

== Services ==
The General Authority for Radio and Television is the governmental body responsible for radio and television broadcasting in Syria. It is divided into two parts:

=== Radio ===
Radio broadcasting began in the First Syrian Republic upon its independence on 17 April 1946 on shortwave. As early as 1942, Radio Damas, a counterpart to Radio Levant in Beirut, Lebanon, existed in the French League of Nations mandate.

==== Nationwide broadcasting ====
- Radio Damascus (Arabic: إذاعة دمشق, romanized: Iḏāʿa Dimashq; since 1947)
- Sawt Al-Shabab FM (Arabic: صوت الشباب; since 2002) – suspended
- Radio Souryana (Arabic: سوريان, romanized: Sūryānā; since 2015) – suspended

===== Formerly broadcasting =====
- Sawt Al-Shab (Arabic: صوت الشعب, romanized: Ṣaut aš-Šaʿb, lit. 'Voice of the people') (1979–2017)

==== Regional broadcasting ====
- Radio Sanabel FM, in Al-Hasakah
- Radio Aleppo FM, in Aleppo
- Radio Amwaj FM, in Latakia
- Radio Tartus, in Tartus
- Radio Zenobia, in Homs
- Radio al-Karma, in Sweida

The shortwave international broadcaster Radio Damascus has existed from 1947 until 2013. According to the frequency announcements in the program, both FM (VHF) and AM (medium wave) are broadcast.

=== Television ===
The television station is based in Damascus, Syria since July 1960. The channel airs programmes in Arabic and English. Its first channel, Channel 1, was broadcasting in black and white until 1978. A second channel was added in 1985 (discontinued in 2012 due to the civil war) and in 1996, the satellite service Syria TV began broadcasting. On 5 September 2012, Syrian Television channel broadcasts were broken off on Arabsat and Nilesat, including Syria TV. Syria TV and Syrian Drama TV broadcasts were stopped on Hot Bird on 22 October 2012.

The digital television switchover (DVB-T) in Syria has been restarted since mid-2018, in the provinces of Damascus, Daraa, As Suwayda, Rif Dimashq, Tartus, Latakia, Quneitra and Hama, however there is still no date for an analog switch off.

==== Currently broadcasting ====
- Al-Souriya TV (since 1995), also known as Syria TV, distributed through digital terrestrial television (DTT) and satellite television (Nilesat, Es'hailSat)
- Syrian News Channel, also known as Al-Ikhbariyah Syria (since 2010), distributed through digital terrestrial television (DTT) and satellite television (Nilesat, Es'hailSat)

==== Suspended since December 2024 ====
- Syrian Local Channel, distributed through DTT
- Noor Al-Sham
- Syrian Drama TV
- Syrian Education TV
- Drama 24
- Sports TV
- Sakaker Kids TV
- Syriana TV
- Ugarit TV – a regional channel from Latakia; Latakia Radio and Television Center was established in 1987 for the hosting of the 1987 Mediterranean Games

Former channels include Syrian Medical TV and Talaqie TV which both ceased broadcasting in 2016 and terrestrial channels Channel 2 and Channel 1, which ceased broadcasting in 2012.

== See also ==
- Television in Syria
- List of radio stations in Syria
