= Raed Fares (activist) =

Syrian political activist

- رائد فارس
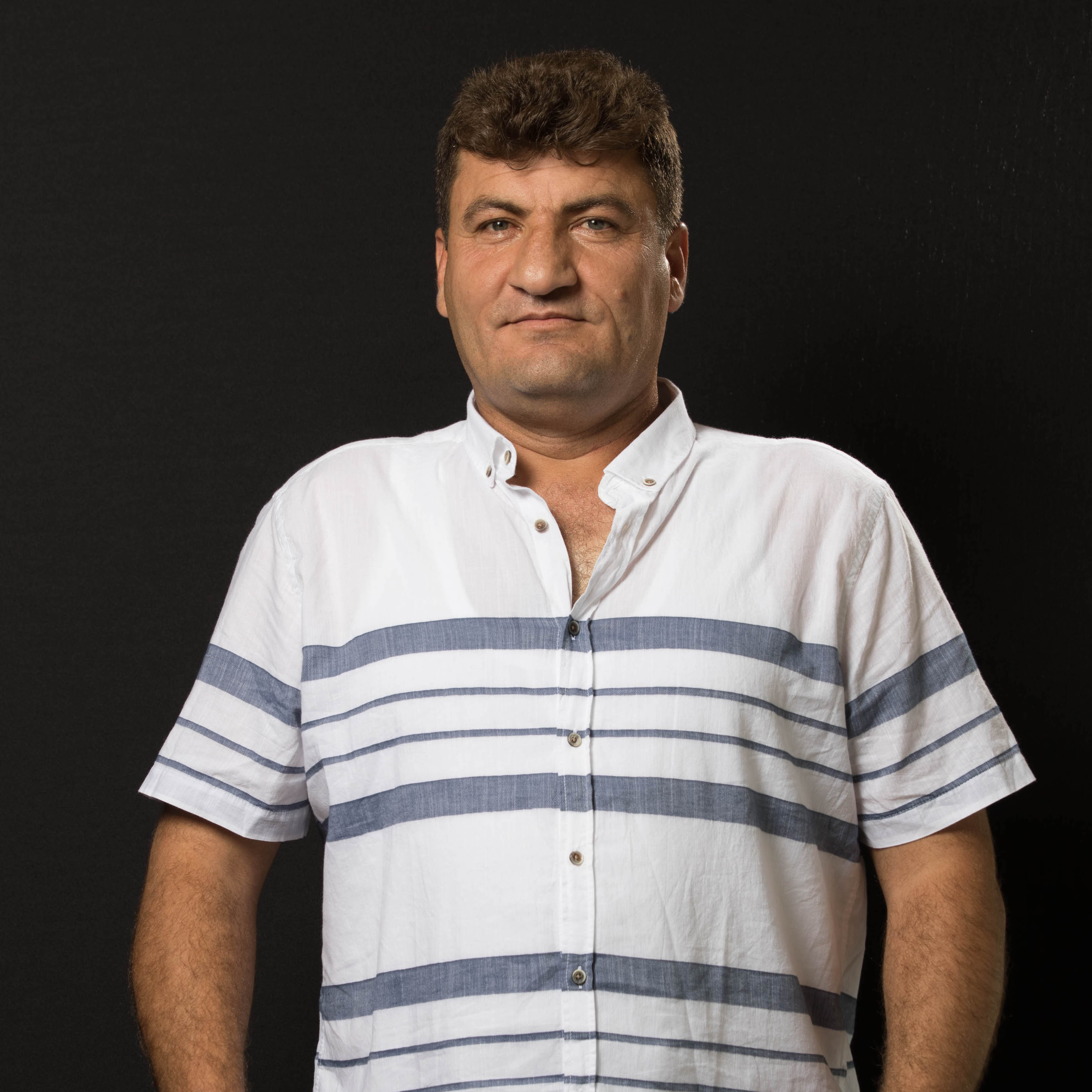
- Fares in 2017
- Born: Raed Fares; 1972; Kafr Nabl, Syria
- Died: 23 November 2018 (aged 46); Kafr Nabl, Syria
- Cause of death: Gunshot wound
- Known for: Citizen journalist; Activist

Raed Fares (Arabic: رائد فارس Rāʾid Fāris; 1972 – 23 November 2018) was a Syrian journalist, activist and civil society leader from Kafr Nabl, Syria. He was the founder of Radio Fresh FM in 2013, an independent radio station reaching audiences in Idlib, Aleppo, and Hamah provinces. He was assassinated by unknown militants in his hometown. Hay'at Tahrir al-Sham (HTS) was blamed for his death.

== Activism ==
At the beginning of the 2011 Syrian uprising, Fares took part in hundreds of demonstrations against President Bashar al-Assad's regime and continued to see it as the biggest enemy. Fares used to take pictures of demonstrations and spread them on the internet, which later developed to the idea of creating a media center in his city, Kafr Nabl. He grabbed the attention of the world's media for his gipping, sometimes sarcastic protests and pro-democracy banners including English language banners which called for peaceful revolution in Syria.

Fares was a prominent critic of Syrian President Bashar al-Assad as well as militant groups like the Islamic State of Iraq and the Levant (ISIL) and Hay'at Tahrir al-Sham (HTS), which was in control of the area of Idlib where Fares was killed. Fares also ran the Kafranbel Media Center, which gained prominence in the Syrian uprising against the Assad regime with their use of English-language protest banners which were shared on social media.

Fares has been subject to several assassination attempts because of his work in the revolution. On 28 January 2014, he was shot three times in his chest and was taken to an emergency room. Fares survived this assassination attempt after a long surgery. He had also been abducted and tortured by al-Qaeda affiliated militants.

=== Radio Fresh ===
Fares set up Radio Fresh FM in 2013, in order to provide "independent news to the Syrian people". The station was set up in Kafranbel and reaches audiences in Idlib, Aleppo, and Hamah provinces. Radio Fresh broadcasts information critical of both radical Islamist groups like al-Qaeda and ISIL, as well as the regime of President Assad. The Hay'at Tahrir al-Sham (HTS) militant group, which controls the area, had ordered Radio Fresh to stop broadcasting music and to take women off the air. Radio Fresh responded by playing sounds such as tweeting birds and ticking sounds, clucking chickens and bleating goats, and modifying women's voices with computer software, as a sarcastic gesture against these demands. Radio Fresh provided media training for more than 2500 young men and women to allow them to be able to become citizen-journalists and cover the news in Syria.

Radio Fresh is partly funded by the Human Rights Foundation, which organises the Oslo Freedom Forum. Fares spoke at an Oslo Freedom Forum event in 2017.

== Assassination ==
On 23 November 2018, Raed Fares was shot by unknown assailants in his hometown, along with friend and fellow opposition activist Hamoud Jneed. The shooting resulted in both their deaths. Fares's killers have not been identified, but The Guardian reported that they "waited in a van outside an office the two men shared, followed them through the market, attacked their car then shot them when they tried to escape". Fares's death was met with widespread condemnation and shock, and occasional international tributaries. The National reported that local opposition activists blamed the Hay'at Tahrir al-Sham (HTS) militant group for the attack, though HTS has not claimed responsibility.
