= Prime TV (Syria) =

Syrian television network

- Type: Broadcasting drama, entertainment, news
- Country: Syria
- Broadcast area: MENA

Programming
- Language: Arabic
- Picture format: HDTV

Ownership
- Key people: Mayas Suhail (Director)

History
- Launched: 8 December 2025

Links
- Website: prime1tv.com

Availability

Terrestrial
- Nilesat 201: 12687 H
- Eutelsat 7 West A: 11449 H

Streaming media
- Prime Tv Live: Free

Prime TV (Arabic: تلفزيون برايم) is a Syrian private television channel that serves as the official sponsor and official broadcaster of the Syrian Prime Premier League (the top-tier Syrian football league), carrying live matches and related sports coverage.

The channel was launched on 8 December 2025 under the name Al-Oula Prime (الأولى برايم) as a private media project offering news, social, cultural, sports, and entertainment content. On 17 December 2025, it was rebranded as Prime TV.

== Broadcasting ==
Prime TV broadcasts free-to-air (FTA) via satellite on Eutelsat 7 West A (7.3° West), covering the MENA beam. The channel is transmitted on 11449 H using the DVB-S2 (8PSK) system, with a symbol rate of 27,500 and FEC 2/3, delivering MPEG-4 HD (1080) video in Arabic, without encryption. It is also available on Nilesat, broadcasting on 12687 H, with a symbol rate of 27,500 and FEC 7/8.

The channel also offers a live stream through its official website.

== See also ==
- Television in Syria
- List of Arabic-language television channels
