= Noor Al-Sham =

- Country: Syria
- Broadcast area: Syria; Arab world Turkey; Balkan countries Central Asia; Africa; South Asia; Southeast Asia
- Headquarters: Damascus

Programming
- Language: Arabic

Ownership
- Owner: GART
- Sister channels: Syria TV, Syrian News Channel, Syrian Drama TV, Syrian Education TV

History
- Launched: 31 July 2011; 15 years ago
- Closed: 8 December 2024; 21 months ago

Links
- Website: nour-elsham.sy

Availability

Streaming media
- Noor Al-Sham Live: Free

Logo until 2018

Noor Al-Sham, also spelled Nour El-Sham (Arabic: قناة نور الشام, lit. 'The Light of the Levant') was a state-run, religious satellite television station based in Damascus, Syria from 31 July 2011 until 8 December 2024.

The channel intended "to convey a broad and genuine understanding of Islam and its legal rules", according to SANA. The broadcasts were terminated on 8 December 2024 due to Damascus' takeover by the Syrian Army and the subsequent collapse of the Assad regime.
