= Syrian Drama TV =

- Final logo used from 2018 to 2024
- Country: Syria
- Broadcast area: Syria
- Headquarters: Umayyad Square, Damascus

Programming
- Language: Arabic

Ownership
- Owner: GART
- Sister channels: Al-Souriya TV, Syrian News Channel, Noor Al-Sham, Syrian Education TV

History
- Launched: 20 August 2009; 17 years ago
- Closed: 8 December 2024; 21 months ago

Availability

Streaming media
- Syrian Drama TV Live: Free

Previous logo, used until 2018.

Syrian Drama TV (Arabic: قناة سورية دراما) was a government-owned television station based in Damascus, Syria from 20 August 2009 to 8 December 2024. Syrian Drama TV broadcast was stopped on Eutelsat Hot Bird 13 East on 22 October 2012.

Its goal was to support Syrian drama after the great successes it achieved in the Arab world and to shed light on issues of Syrian society in particular and the Arab community in general. It was focused on social, cultural, economic, political and life issues for the Syrian and Arab citizens. The channel ceased broadcasting on 8 December 2024, following Damascus' takeover by the Syrian Army and the subsequent collapse of the Assad regime.

== See also ==
- List of Syrian television series
- List of Syrian films
