= Channel 1 (Syria) =

Syrian TV channel

Channel 1 القناة الأولى
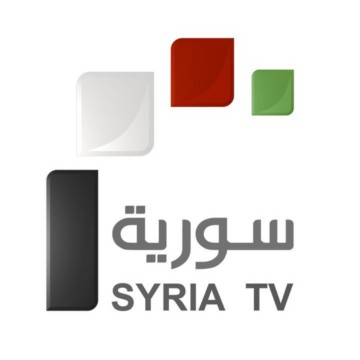
- Type: Terrestrial television
- Country: Syria
- Broadcast area: Nationwide

Programming
- Language: Arabic

Ownership
- Owner: General Organization of Radio and TV
- Sister channels: Channel 2

History
- Launched: 23 July 1960; 66 years ago
- Closed: 11 November 2012; 13 years ago

Syria TV, also known as Channel 1 (Arabic: القناة الأولى) was a Syrian television channel launched on 23 July 1960. Its broadcast coverage was solely limited to Syria and broadcast service programs. It operated as an interactive local channel. Channel 1 was shut down in 2012.

== History ==
Syrian Television began broadcasts on 23 July 1960, during Syria's short-lived union with Egypt. It began with the phrase, "Here is Damascus", as delivered by Sabah Qabbani. It was broadcast from its studios situated at the highest peak of Mount Qasioun, with low power of no more than 10 kilowatts and only for one and a half hours reaching only Damascus. Its broadcasting hours increased over time. After the 1961 military coup which dissolved the union, Syrian TV broadcast a speech delivered by Shukri al-Quwatli, the first post-independence president of Syria, in October 1961, which was recorded in Switzerland.

Experimental color broadcasts began in 1978, with only a handful of programs being in color at the time, being broadcast for four hours. Regular color broadcasts began in 1980 using PAL and SECAM systems. Amid the civil war, Channel 1 ceased broadcasting on 11 November 2012 in preparation for the official launch of the short-lived satellite television channel Talaqie TV.
