= Alyaum TV =

Arabic-language television network

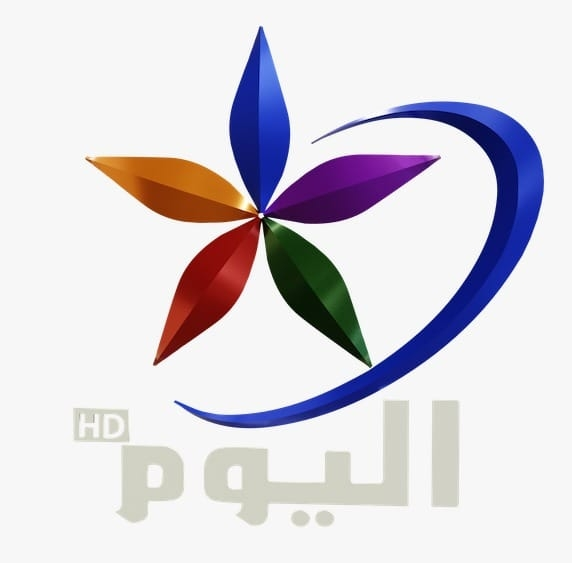
- Type: Broadcasting drama, entertainment, news
- Country: Syria
- Broadcast area: MENA

Programming
- Language: Arabic
- Picture format: HDTV

History
- Launched: 27 October 2003; 22 years ago

Links
- Website: alyaumtv.net

Availability

Terrestrial
- Nilesat 201: 12687 H 27500

Streaming media
- Alyaum TV Live: Free

Alyaum TV (Arabic: قناة اليوم, romanized: Qanāt al-Yawm, lit. 'al-Yaum Channel'), also Al Yaum TV, is an Arabic-language news television channel that broadcasts in the Middle East. Launched in 2003, the channel primarily focuses on Syrian news and current affairs.

== Broadcasting ==
Alyaum TV broadcasts via satellite on Nilesat (12687 H 27500) free-to-air (FTA). The channel also offers a live stream through its official website.

== Programs ==
Alyaum TV is known for entertaining and distinctive programs such as:

- Cairo Today with Amr Adib (القاهرة اليوم مع عمرو أديب)
- Eyes of Beirut (عيون بيروت)
- Please Understand Me (أرجوك إفهمني)
- Program from Riyadh (suspended) (برنامج من الرياض (الموقوف))"

== See also ==
- Television in Syria
- Television in Lebanon
- List of Arabic-language television channels
