= Syrian Education TV =

- Country: Syria
- Broadcast area: Syria
- Network: ORTAS
- Headquarters: Damascus

Programming
- Language: Arabic

Ownership
- Owner: ORTAS
- Sister channels: Al-Souriya TV, Syrian Drama TV, Syrian News Channel, Noor Al-Sham

History
- Launched: 14 October 2008; 17 years ago
- Closed: 8 December 2024; 20 months ago

Availability

Streaming media
- Syrian Education TV Live: Free

Syrian Education TV (Arabic: القناة الفضائية التربوية السورية) was launched by the Syrian Ministry of Education on 14 October 2008 on Arabsat. It was later launched in June 2009 to broadcast from Damascus on Nilesat.

It shut down on 8 December 2024, following the takeover of Damascus by the Syrian Army and the subsequent collapse of the Assad regime.
