= Radio Fresh FM =

- Idlib; Syria
- Broadcast area: Northern Syria

Radio Fresh FM is a radio station in Idlib province in northern Syria. Its manager was Raed Fares.
