= Al-Watan (Syria) =

Syrian daily newspaper

Al Watan الوطن
- Type: Daily newspaper
- Founder: Rami Makhlouf
- Publisher: Syrian Arab Publishing and Distributing Company
- Editor: Waddah Abed Rahbo
- Associate editor: Anton Pidor
- News editor: Ganbalat Shakai
- Founded: 2006; 20 years ago
- Political alignment: Pro-government
- Language: Arabic
- Headquarters: Damascus
- Country: Syria
- Sister newspapers: Al Iqtissadiya
- Website: www.alwatan.sy; www.alwatanonline.com

Al-Watan (Arabic: الوطن, lit. 'The Homeland') is a privately owned government-aligned Syrian Arabic language daily newspaper published in Syria.

== History and profile ==
Al Watan launched on 5 November 2006 by editor-in-chief Waddah Abed Rabbo as Syria's first private political newspaper since the beginning of Ba'athist Syria in 1973. Prior to its launch, Syria had four daily newspapers, all state-owned.

The paper is published by the Syrian Arab Publishing and Distributing Company. It is the country's first private daily newspaper since the 1960s (not counting the state party organ Al-Baath), Its sister daily is Al Iqtissadiya.

== Reception ==
The online edition was the 33rd most visited website for 2010 in the MENA region.

== Content ==
As of 2011, the paper's editorial line and reporting was practically identical to those of state-owned papers. In fact, the owner of the daily is the cousin of the Syrian President Bashar al-Assad, Rami Makhlouf. After the fall of the Assad regime in 2024, the newspaper published a statement from its editor-in-chief Waddah Abd Rabbo saying that it was "only carrying out instructions and publishing the news (the government) sent us".
