= Ghassan Aboud =

Syrian businessman

- غسان عبود
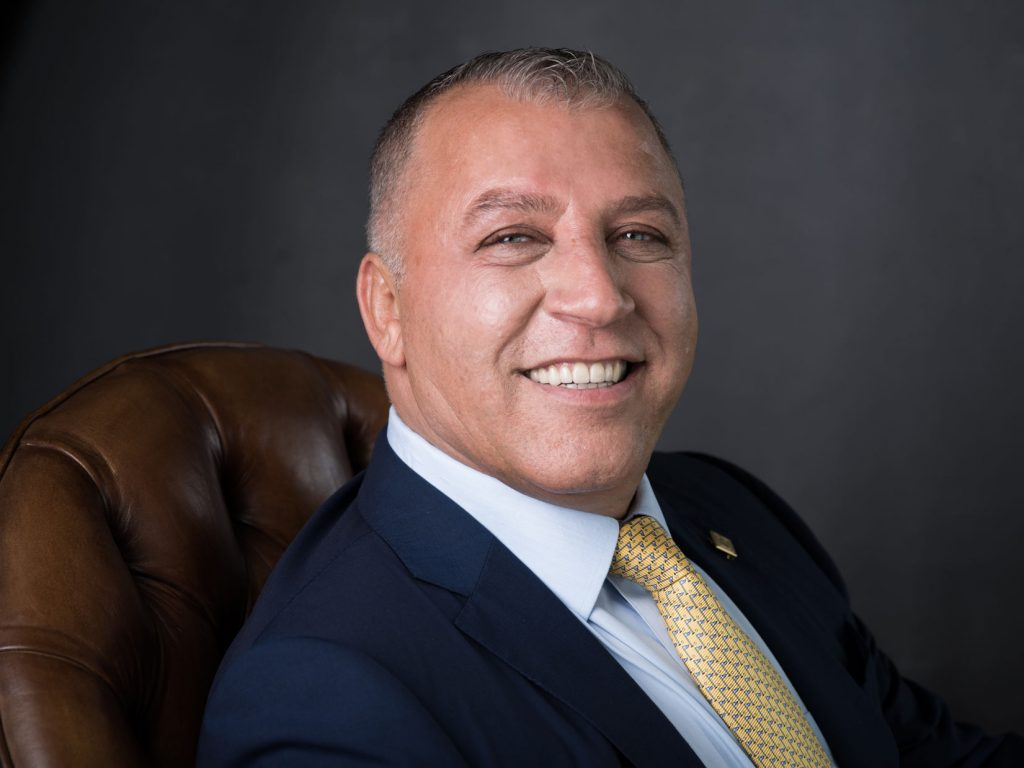
- Born: 4 August 1967 (age 59); Idlib Governorate, Syria
- Education: Damascus University, Journalism
- Occupations: Entrepreneur, Philanthropist
- Years active: 1991–present
- Known for: founding Ghassan Aboud Group
- Spouse: Nahed Aboud
- Children: 5
- Website: https://gagroup.net/

Muhammed Ghassan Aboud (Arabic: غسان عبود; born 1967) is a Syrian entrepreneur. He is one of the founding members of the Syrian Business Council and the Ghassan Aboud Group. Based in the United Arab Emirates, Aboud was listed in the 2018 issue of the Top 50 Most Influential Expats in the UAE by Forbes Middle East. In 2019, his net worth was estimated at $1.75 billion by Forbes magazine.

== Personal life ==
Muhammed Ghassan Aboud was born on August 4, 1967, in the city of Idlib in northern Syria. He is married to Nahed Aboud and has five children.

== Career ==
He moved to the United Arab Emirates in October 1992, where he first worked in the public relations field before founding the Ghassan Aboud Group in the year 1994.

Ghassan Aboud Group commenced business as a small trader in new automobiles and spare parts. Over the years, he developed the business into a diversified conglomerate.

In 2018, Ghassan Aboud was named in the list of Top 50 Most Influential Expats in the UAE by Forbes Middle East.

== Timeline ==
- 1994 : Ghassan Aboud's first venture - Ghassan Aboud Cars & Spare Parts.
- 2008 : Live Point Art Production established for art and TV production.
- 2008 : Orient News set up to cater to Syrian diaspora in Arab world.
- 2016 : GA Group Australia was established as a specialized investment entity for the acquisition and development of hospitality assets. In-house hospitality brand Crystalbrook Collection set up as a GA Group entity in Australia.
- 2017 : Grandiose Supermarket & Catering created.
- 2017 : Gallega Global Logistics established.
- 2019 : Purchased the Byron Resort from Gerry Harvey for approximately $42 million AUD.

== Organizations ==
=== Ghassan Aboud Group ===
The Ghassan Aboud Group (GAG) is an international conglomerate operating in industries such as automotive, logistics, media, hospitality, real estate, retail and also bespoke catering. Established in 1994 and headquartered in the United Arab Emirates for about 25 years, GAG's business operations are complemented by offices in Australia, Belgium, China, Jordan and Turkey.

In October 2018, Ghassan Aboud Group was appointed as a distributor for export markets by HPCL Middle East FZCO, subsidiary of Indian public sector petroleum company, Hindustan Petroleum Corporation Limited (HPCL). Ghassan Aboud Group markets HPCL's products like auto lubricants, industrial lubricants, asphalt, and solvents in the Middle East region.

It ranked 27th in the UAE's Top 50 Private Companies by Forbes Middle East in its December 2018 publication

In August 2021, the conglomerate launched BuyParts24, the region's largest online auto-parts marketplace. The marketplace signed significant partnerships with prominent market leaders including Al Habtoor Motors LLC, Easa Saleh Al Gurg Group, Nasser Bin Abdullatif Alserkal, Bin Hamoodah Auto, AWR Rostamani and others.

=== Ghassan Aboud Cars & Spare Parts ===
The automotive business was established in 1994 in Sharjah, United Arab Emirates. It started as a trading business dealing in vehicles, spare parts and accessories, the company now deals with passenger vehicles, commercial vehicles, heavy trucks and equipment, spare parts, lubricants & accessories and offers multi-country trade, with inbound and outbound logistics, storage, value addition, transportation, and documentation.

Over the past 25 years, Ghassan Aboud Cars & Spare Parts has grown into specialists in regional and international automotive supply chain with a market reach of 100+ countries. It also has facilities in Khalifa Industrial Zone (KIZAD), Abu Dhabi and Dubai and additional hubs in Belgium and Jordan.

Currently, the auto business employs 350 staff.

=== Crystalbrook Collection ===
Ghassan Aboud established the Crystalbrook Collection, as an in-house hospitality management company in 2016 through acquisitions of hotel properties in Australia. Headquartered in Dubai, UAE, almost $600 million has been made to date for the acquisitions and development of hospitality assets in Australia. It has three 5 star hotel projects - Riley, a Crystalbrook Collection Resort, Bailey, a Crystalbrook Collection Hotel and Flynn, a Crystalbrook Collection Hotel, along with Crystalbrook Lodge, Little Albion guest house in Sydney, Crystalbrook Superyacht Marina and a 90 foot vessel anchored in Port Douglas, Queensland named MV Bahama.

In 2018, he was named Leading International Hospitality Investor for his investments into Crystalbrook Collection, Australia.

In September 2022, the Crystalbrook Collection purchased the Rydges Sydney Harbour hotel for about $100m.

=== Live Point Art Production ===
Established in 2008, Live Point Art produces news, socio-political, current events programs with a focus on the Arab region. They supply the programs to both foreign and Arabic channels. The programs include news reports, various broadcasts, studio and live window services along with entertainment programs like drama and film production, TV shows, dubbing, subtitling and distribution. Headquartered in Dubai - United Arab Emirates, it has branches in Jordan and Istanbul.

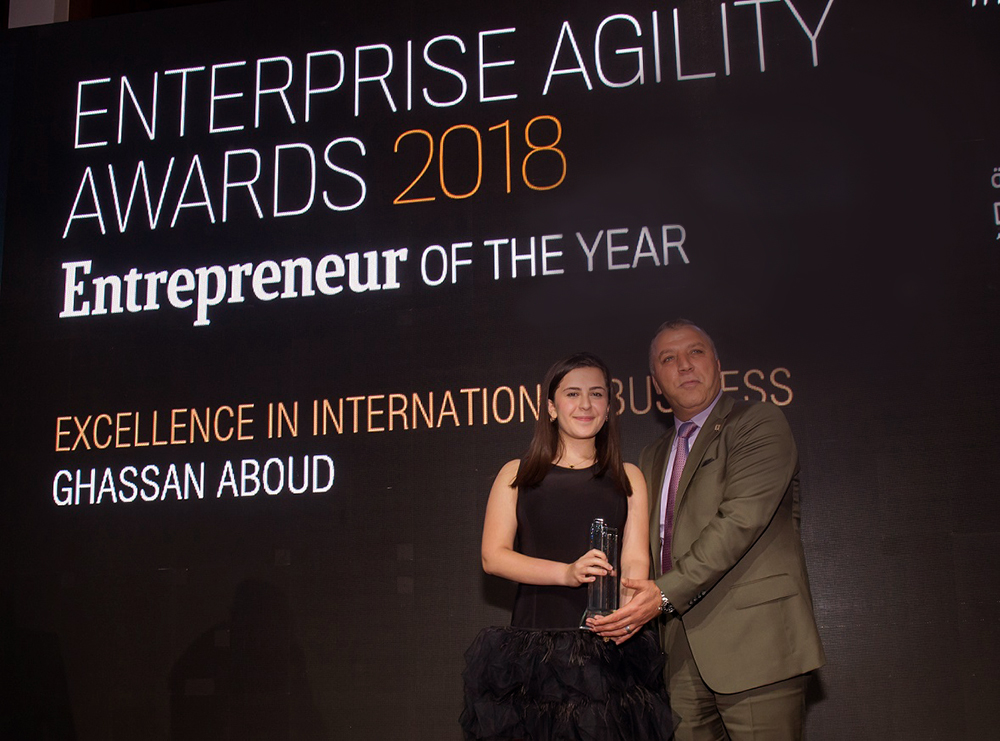
Ghassan Aboud awarded Entrepreneur of the Year

=== Orient Media ===
In 2008, he established Orient News, a satellite channel based out of UAE. Orient TV broadcasts news, current affairs and general entertainment programmes to the GCC, Levant, and parts of North Africa. Known for its objective coverage, the channel offers a mix of programs that include current affairs, news, culture, and entertainment.

Orient Radio is an Arabic radio-station broadcasting varied content; news, economic, sports, social shows, and Arabic music.

Orient Training Center was launched in 2018 as a specialized training center based in Dubai, Istanbul & Amman, providing short-term courses in media and production fields such as TV presenting, radio anchoring, journalism, documentary, directing etc. in a real T.V and production house environment.

=== Grandiose Supermarkets & Catering ===
Established in 2017, Grandiose is a retail brand with a chain of niche supermarkets and catering outlets in UAE. There are nearly 50 outlets spread across Dubai, Abu Dubai and Sharjah as of 2025. Grandiose Catering is a catering division for retail, corporate and outdoor catering.

In December 2018, Grandiose Catering was awarded the "Catering Company of the Year" at the 2018 Leaders in F & B Awards held in Dubai.

Grandiose Supermarket was awarded Consumer Retailer of the Year at the Gulf Business Awards 2024.

=== Gallega Global Logistics ===
Established in 2017, Gallega Global Logistics provides End-to-End logistics to 3PL customers in the UAE and the region. In May 2018, a 275,000 square metre logistics facility was established in Khalifa Industrial Zone Abu Dhabi (KIZAD), Abu Dhabi to cater as a full-scale automotive logistics facility with a vehicle storage yard, warehouses, workshops, offices, body shop and PDI facility.

=== Pastoral Business ===
Ghassan Aboud Group has invested in the pastoral business in Australia with land holding of 35,000 hectares with a carrying capacity of 2,500 breeders. The milk and meat produced will be supplied to customers and also for GAG's hospitality business.

== Awards and honors ==
Year of award or honor	Name of award or honor	Awarding organization
2019	Ranked #41 in Forbes Middle East's Top 100 Business Tycoons	Forbes Middle East
2019	Ranked #27 in Forbes Middle East Billionaires List	Forbes Middle East
2018	Top 50 Most Influential Expats in the UAE	Forbes Middle East
2018	Top 50 companies in UAE	Forbes Middle East
2018	Leading Hospitality Investor	BNC Publishing
2018	Catering Company of the Year - Grandiose Catering	F & B Awards
2018	Excellence in International Business	Entrepreneur - Enterprise Agility Awards
2018	No. 1 on the Power 50 List of the Most Influential People in TNQ (Queensland) by The Cairns Post	Cairns Post
2017	Ranked first by the Australian publication Tropic Now in their 2017 Power 50 list	Tropic Now
2017	GA Group’s Cairns CBD developments impress Australian Prime Minister	Tropic Now
2015	The Global Gift Philanthropreneur Award	Global Gift Foundation

== Philanthropy ==
Ghassan Aboud established Orient for Human Relief in 2012 to provide medical, educational, and social services to the millions of Syrians that have been displaced or injured in the Syrian conflict. The organization receives doctors from international organizations such as the Syrian American Medical Society, USAID, and Hand in Hand International from the United Kingdom.

In 2015, he received the Global Gift Foundation’s Philanthropreneur Award in recognition of his humanitarian work.

== See also ==
- List of companies of the United Arab Emirates
- Emaar Group
- Majid Al Futtaim Group
- Hayel Saeed Anam Group
- Al Shirawi Enterprises Group
- Al Tayer Group
