= Fadaat Media =

Qatari media company

- Native name: فضاءات ميديا
- Type: Private
- Founded: 2012
- Headquarters: Doha, Qatar
- Area served: Arab world
- Key people: Moayed Deeb (CEO)
- Website: fadaatmedia.com/en

Fadaat Media (Arabic: فضاءات ميديا, romanized: Faḍāʾāt Mīdiyā) is a Qatar-based media company that owns and operates a range of media outlets, including websites, newspapers, and broadcast TV channels in both Arabic and English.

Fadaat Media Group is among the largest media networks in the Arab world, with operations in 35 offices worldwide and an estimated global reach exceeding 500 million people.

The current CEO of Fadaat Media Group is Maayed Dib.

== History ==
Fadaat Media Group was founded in 2012 as a private commercial media company headquartered in Doha, the capital of Qatar. Beginning in 2013, the group established several media outlets across digital, print, and broadcast platforms.

Its first media outlet, The New Arab, an Arabic-language news website, was launched in March 2014. In September 2014, the company expanded into print media with the launch of the Arabic daily newspaper of the same name. In 2015, Fadaat Media entered television broadcasting with the establishment of the Al Araby Television Network which has been touted as a counterweight to Al Jazeera in respect to the latter's perceived bias towards the Muslim Brotherhood in Egypt.

== Editorial focus and activities ==
Fadaat Media Group produces news, analysis, and cultural content aimed at Arab audiences. According to the company, its media outlets seek to provide neutral and unbiased news coverage and in-depth analysis of political, social, and cultural issues.

The group's content includes reporting on current affairs as well as coverage of literature, the arts, and entertainment, and is distributed through newspapers, television channels, and digital platforms in Arabic and English. Fadaat Media operates across the Arab world and internationally.

== Newspapers ==
The New Arab was the first media project launched by Fadaat Media. It operates as both a digital news platform and a print newspaper. The Arabic-language website was launched in March 2014, followed by the first print edition in September 2014.

The newspaper publishes coverage of political, social, and cultural developments in the Arab world and internationally, drawing on a network of correspondents based in multiple countries. The print edition consists of 32 full-colour pages and is distributed across several Arab and Western countries, including the United Kingdom, Qatar, Turkey, Tunisia, Morocco, and a number of European states. The newspaper consists of 32 colored pages, distributed in a variety of Arab and Western countries. It is distributed in 158 cities, 10 airports, on Qatar Airways and Turkish Airlines flights, 750 hotels and public centers, 1,770 sale points, and 360 Arab embassies and consulates all over the world.

== TV Channels ==
Fadaat Media owns and operates several television and streaming platforms, including:

- Al Araby Television Network: This is a news outlet that focuses on observing and analyzing current events and their context. It was first broadcast in London in 2015. It has 62 reporters spread throughout 33 cities.
- Al Araby 2: Launched in 2022, Alaraby 2 is a cultural and entertainment channel based in Qatar. It provides various programming for Arab viewers, including films, documentaries, drama, comedy, culture, and the arts.
- Al Araby+ : It is an OTT streaming service that provides live television and on-demand programming from Alaraby TV, Alaraby 2, Syria TV, and Alaraby Al-Jadeed. It has a selection of television shows, movies, documentaries, and entertainment content, and also offers Arab viewers a wide range of viewing options.
- Syria TV: is a Syrian news television channel base in Turkey that strives to offer regular coverage of Syrian issues. Founded in 2018, it claims to follow the founding principles of the Syrian revolution.
- Al Thania TV: is a Syrian general entertainment television channel, founded in 2025.
- Metafora Production: It is a private company in Qatar that creates auteur films and TV shows. The company's claimed goals are artistic freedom, beauty, and life free from poverty, hardship, and oppression.
- Al Modon: This is a Beirut-based news media outlet that covers the civilian spectrum in Lebanon and the Arab world. It claims to support freedom, democracy, growth, identity, and resistance to outside interference in Arab communities. Al-Modon primarily concentrates on Lebanon, Syria, and Palestine, but it also covers significant events throughout the Arab world.

=== Websites ===
- Fadaat Media only launched one website which was a printed newspaper and a website. Based in London, the capital of the United Kingdom, Al-Araby Al-Jadeed is a cultural news website that offers services in Arabic.
- Later on, the English version of the website, The New Arab, was launched in 2014, using a network of authors to deliver local and international news and being led by journalists and media specialists in over 20 countries.
