= Al-Ba'ath =

Arabic language newspaper

Al-Ba'ath البعث
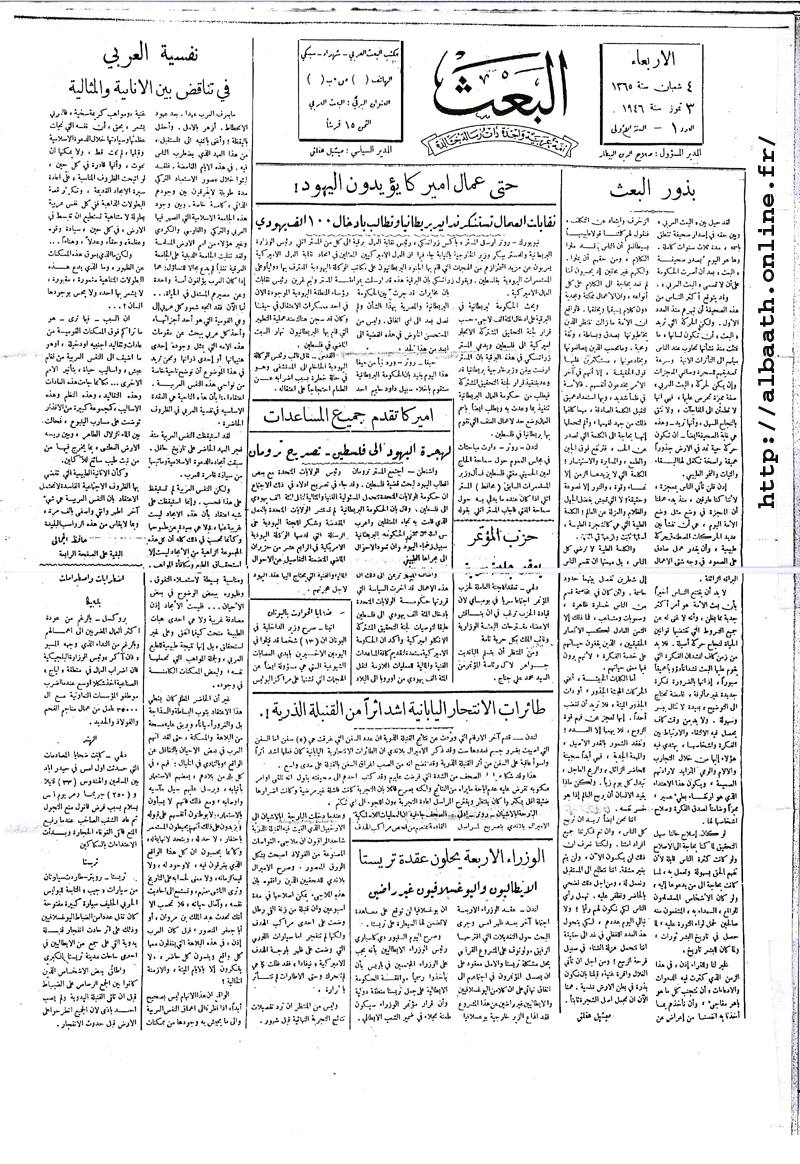
- The first page of the first issue of newspaper
- Type: Daily newspaper
- Format: Compact
- Owner: Syrian Regional Branch of the Arab Socialist Ba'ath Party
- Publisher: Abdullah al-Ahmar
- Founded: 1948; 78 years ago
- Ceased publication: 2024; 2 years ago
- Political alignment: Arab Socialist Ba'ath Party – Syria Region
- Language: Arabic
- Headquarters: Damascus, Syria
- Country: Ba'athist Syria
- Website: albaathmedia.sy/

Al-Ba'ath (Arabic: البعث, lit. 'The Resurrection') was an Arabic language newspaper published by the Ba'ath Party in Syria and other Arab countries and territories, including Lebanon and Palestine.

== History ==
Al-Ba'ath was founded in 1948 (according to other sources, in 1946), but the newspaper applied for a publishing license as early as 1943, as an organ of the Arab Socialist Ba'ath Party of Syria. The government's main condition at the time was that the newspaper not be named after the party (which ultimately did not happen). At the time of its founding, Michel Aflaq became the newspaper's political director, and Salah ad-Din al-Bitar became the executive director. In 1962, the newspaper was ordered closed, but the Ba'athists failed to be suppressed - the party's national command continued and intensified its attacks on the government, clearly demonstrating its hostility towards it.

=== Ba'ath party rule ===
After the Ba'ath Party came to power in 1963, the number of newspapers permitted for publication was greatly reduced - previously this figure had reached 74, but now only three were permitted for publication: al-Thawra, Tishreen and Al-Ba'ath (little-known and regional newspapers are not taken into account). In 1965, the daily circulation of the newspaper was estimated at 10,000 copies. The newspaper was described as socialist but anti-Nasserist: For example, the newspaper stated that the union between Syria and Egypt "only is wrong and harmful", and was "surrender to emotionalism of masses". The newspaper also announced in 1966 the transformation of the army into an ideological instrument to achieve the transition to socialism. On October 19 of the same year, the newspaper announced the recent formation and mobilization of the Syrian People's Army and the workers' and peasants' militia with the aim of "protect the revolution against its enemies at home and abroad." After the Syrian intervention started in 1976, the newspaper began covering the Lebanese Civil War. Al-Ba'ath newspaper also made repeated attacks on leader of Ba'athist Iraq, Saddam Hussein, with whom Syria had serious disagreements: for example, in 1980 it called him a pervert.

In addition to the daily, there are also three more state-owned papers in Syria: Al Thawra, Tishreen and Syria Times. Al-Ba'ath is based in Damascus. From 2002 to 2004 Mahdi Dakhlallah was the editor-in-chief of Al-Ba'ath.

=== Syrian civil war and the fall of the Ba'athist regime ===
The newspaper became one of the main sources of government propaganda. In 2011, before the revolution came to Syria, Al-Ba'ath newspaper enthusiastically celebrated the regional uprisings of the Arab Spring and even the overthrow of autocrats (especially Egyptian dictator Hosni Mubarak). Since the start of the Syrian civil war, it has constantly reported on famine and economic problems in countries that took actions against Bashar al-Assad's regime. The Ba'ath Media platform and Al-Ba'ath newspaper website stopped publishing news or reports since 7 December 2024. Following the fall of the Assad regime, the editorial board of Al-Ba'ath published a statement on its Facebook announcing its support "with our media, electronic platforms, various institutions and our branches in the governorates and outside Syria, for the transitional phase that promises to preserve the unity of Syria, land and people, and to guarantee the safety of its territories…".

== See also ==
- List of newspapers in Syria
