= Syria TV (Fadaat Media) =

Syrian television network based in Istanbul, Turkey

- Logo used since 2018
- Type: News and talk shows
- Country: Syria
- Broadcast area: Syria; Worldwide (via internet)
- Headquarters: Istanbul, Türkiye

Programming
- Language: Arabic
- Picture format: HDTV

Ownership
- Owner: Fadaat Media
- Sister channels: Al Thania TV; Al Araby; The New Arab

History
- Launched: March 2018

Links
- Website: www.syria.tv

Availability

Terrestrial
- Nilesat 201: 11938 V 30000 (5/6)
- Es'hail 2: 11310 V 30000 (2/3)

Streaming media
- Syria TV Live: Free

Syria TV (Arabic: تلفزيون سوريا, romanized: Tilifizyūn Sūriyā) is a Syrian news television channel owned and operated by the Qatari Fadaat Media network. It was launched in March 2018 in Istanbul, where its headquarters are currently located, as a pro-Syrian opposition network, during the Syrian revolution.

It broadcasts a variety of programs and news shows in Arabic, covering society, politics, entertainment and culture. Syria TV, according to the station's profile, aims at "bridging the spaces and gaps between the members of the Syrian nation.", by trying to reflect the conditions Syrians encounter, both inside Syria and abroad. The channel is said to being funded by Syrian and Arab businessmen.

The current CEO of the channel is Hamza al-Mustafa.

== Programming ==
Syria TV station broadcast programs discussing Syrian people issues, whether inside or outside Syria, along with airing other variety programs discussing different issues, whether political, social, economic, and/or cultural.

=== Reunion ===
A daily window overlooking at Syrians’ major issues, whether inside Syria or in exile. This window tries to touch upon Syrians’ daily life, and to get them together, regardless of their different views or opinions, throughout 2 hours. This can be achieved via discussing Syrian people's sufferings, fears, and joys. The Program topic, which is presented by Ayham Nabei, Yara Edriss, Abed Molhem, Assiya Hisham, and Noor Abdulrahman, is based on Syrian families reunion via social media. So, it is inspired from what is often discussed at WhatsApp/Facebook family groups. So, this topic is meant to create a platform capable of unifying the Syrians, inspired by social media tools, but it is using television tools instead. This means that this program is following up the stories taken from real life along with tracking Syrians’ reactions at social media. Thus, the program serves as a two-way social platform depending on viewers. Probably, Media Talk section, being dependent on social media platforms, as it reports the latest news circulated there, is the section that is based so much on this pattern, along with other sections such as: What Happened? Our Families, and Extra Time.

=== Exclusive Interview ===
A program presenting a weekly interview with political figures influencing Syrian reality, wherein they will be asked direct questions about current issues related to Syria.

=== The Benchmark ===
A weekly talk space presenting commentation and analysis about regional, Arab, and international events affecting Syrian situations. This program depends on analyses provided by the interviewees who are specialists and experts in their fields.

=== What Remained ===
A program presented by the media professional and journalist Mouaz Muhareb. This program introduces news stories presented in a different pattern focusing on pictures, music, and infographics. It depends on a totally different way of presenting adopted by the presenter. This could be traced out via the anchorperson's movements, short introductions, and comments on the stories. This program does not follow the traditional way of presenting news, rather, it turns them into illustrated photographic stories. Program duration is 1:30 mins. divided into three parts, the main, and longest, part is dedicated to the Syrian issues. Meanwhile, the program introduces a different aspect of correspondents’ reports along with following up the trends at social media platforms.

=== Syria Today ===
A daily news analysis program, discussing the most prominent events, both in politics and on ground, whether those taking place in Syria or related to any Syrian issue whatsoever. The program stands as a daily output resulting from newsroom. Any selected topic will be discussed for 20 mins, with two interviewees for each topic discussed. This program commences at 8:00 PM Damascus Time. It is presented by Noor Al-Huda Murad, Homam Sarraj, Aslan Aslan, and Wassim Al-Ahmad.

=== Damascus Forum ===
A weekly talk show discussing issues related to different aspects of the life in Syria. It discusses issues depending on studies, data, and statistics in a way that is reviving the atmosphere of forums that were active in the past. It also tries a to work on creating a new, more appropriate environment that is more compatible to the real life after long experiences. This program is meant to study the causes and effects of any case by adopting methodological techniques.

=== The Syrian Memory ===
A program discussing, documenting, and studying the Syrian history as well as memories through their manifestations reflected on the political, economic, cultural, and social aspects. It discusses the events, their situations, context and background, in open dialogues with individuals who witnessed that era of Syria's modern history, those who faced the twists of history that created the life we live right now. So that these interviews will serve as testimonies about Syria, Syrian prominent figures, and international relations. Those who will participate in these discussions will be selected from those who had contributed to, observed, or studied these incidents as specialists.

=== Distinguished Cultural Figures & Events ===
A cultural program discussing the latest cultural activities, the most problematic cultural issues, in addition to recognizing the different generations of these activities and events. This program highlights the most recent literary and cultural works discussing anything related to Syria. To do this, the program depends on interviews with specialists and in-studio audience.

=== A Life Ring ===
A program interested in discussing problematic controversial social phenomena faced by the Syrians, inside and outside Syria, depending on stories and incidents narrated by those who witnessed them to be discussed with specialists and in-studio audience.

=== Tuesday’s Economic Show ===
A weekly program covering the economic events that might be of interest to the Syrians in general, along with focusing on international economic issues.

=== Medical Prescription ===
A weekly medical program pursuing medial matters, aiming to raise the public awareness. It played a major role in raising awareness during the pandemic of COVID-19. This program presents scientific materials in cooperation with "Your Health" website.

=== Fake Book ===
A weekly program searching for, and scrutinizing the materials posted at social media platforms. It browses the news in general, side by side with false news and misleading rumors in particular, to refute and correct them along with searching for their source.

=== Syria's Eye ===
A weekly program depending on what is produced by Syria TV correspondents. It focuses on reports discussing Syrian stories of success, whether inside or outside Syria.

=== Joe Show ===
Previously Joe Tube, a sarcastic comic political show divided into sections discussing political situations in the Arab World. It makes fun of political situation in Egypt following the military coup that took place in 2013. The show departed from its YouTube channel to be hosted by Al-Araby Channel, where it has given the title of Joe Show, that is also aired by Syria TV.

=== A Photo’s Tale ===
A documentary series, each episode discusses the story behind an impressive photo taken throughout the years of the Syrian revolution, as it has left a moving effect on peoples’ minds and souls, along with being circulated worldwide as it documented the incident in real time along with its all aspects and human dimensions.

=== A Portion off a Homeland ===
Weekly social documentary series highlighting then life of displaced living in camps. It reflects a real image about their situations that must be introduced to the world, along with documenting the incidents taking place in these camps. Moreover, it sheds a light on camp residents’ innovations and stories of success despite all the conditions they are going through.

=== It Has Finished and Failed ===
A sarcastic comic political puppetry show. Each episode discusses a certain topic simulating Syria's living conditions, depending on a funny family model, so there are two main characters, Adnan Maajouk and his wife, whose voices are mimicked by Ricardo who might play a role with them in certain episodes. Ricardo is the scriptwriter and presenter of this program which is directed by Shadi Khaddam and Omar Beij.

=== Former Programs ===
Noor Khanoum

This program, presented by the Syrian young media professional, Noor Haddad, and aired by Syria TV station, has become a sought-after show whether at TV or at YouTube channels. It has an array of parts, including short acting sections and sarcastic exchanges. The topic here can be summarized as follows: As Noor has retired after being a TV presenter, and since she has quit getting involved in any political debate, she has become a stay-at-home person, or a Khanoum, which means a housewife in the Syrian-Arabic accent. At home, she would start presenting many sections. Noor Khanoum show is criticized for the lack of coherence in the topics discussed in each episode. However, Noor Haddad, when interviewed by the New Arab, claimed that the lack of coherence in her show's topics reflects the domestic nature of any household, because her show is "a home-based show, which means that the studio is divided into rooms and a kitchen, to look like my home. Therefore, there is no need for cohesion or coherence, unlike drama, since we have here a general atmosphere overwhelming everything, adopting swift rhythm reflected in a sarcastic way, that would attract, not repel, the viewers, I expect", added she.

O’ Freedom!

A visual documentation of former Syrian detainees’ experiences in the prisons run by the Syrian regime. This program tries to discover the kind of suffering and experiences witnessed by the detainees, and it discusses, along with the survivors, any possible way for a salvation away from those horrible experiences. Souad Qatanani was the scriptwriter of this program which was directed by Shadi Khaddam.

The Turning Point

A weekly interview with Syrian innovators, authors, intellectuals, and those interested in the Syrian issues, that is meant to study their intellectual twists, and approaches to the sharp turning points in Syria and the region. It was presented by the then CEO, Anas Azrak.

The Political Salon

A weekly program discussing the most important events and issues, depending on interviewing political, cultural figures, as well as journalists and analysts to get conflicting positions and contradicting views together, and to survey Syrian people's views about these issues or events.

Incident Indicator

A weekly political program presented by the media professional Noor Al-Huda Murad. It tries to find out the links connecting between events, to make a basis to understand them, and to anticipate any future scenario. Three observants or event-makers shall be interviewed in each episode. Program duration: 50 mins, it was aired every Wednesday at 10:00 PM, Damascus Time.

This Sea is Mine

A documentary program taking the form of a narrative documenting Syria's diaspora via refugees’ stories throughout the journeys they set off heading towards hosting countries, including discussing what they have left behind in their homeland.

Arab Dystopia

An educational entertainment program combining good humor with providing new ideas along with educative analyses, or historical stories in a very simple way just to make them sink in smoothly and easily depending on humor and fun. Dystopia is an imagined world or society in which people lead wretched, dehumanized, fearful lives. The program started up on 25 December 2017, then it was adopted by Syria TV Station in 2020, since then it has become one of its programs.

== Digital Broadcasting ==
Syria TV is available via the Nilesat and Es’hailSat 2 satellites. The channel also offers a live stream through its official website.

In addition, Syria TV has developed a dedicated mobile application for Android devices, allowing viewers to watch its programs directly via the app.

Regarding digital IPTV broadcasting, the channel is available through the following providers:

- Turkey: Redline
- Sweden: ATN
- Germany: Red360

== See also ==
- Television in Syria
- Media of Syria
- List of Arabic-language television channels
- Al Araby (TV channel)
- Al Jazeera
