= Sama TV =

- Country: Syria
- Broadcast area: Syria
- Headquarters: Damascus, Syria

Programming
- Language: Arabic

History
- Launched: 24 January 2013

Links
- Website: sama-tv.net

Availability

Terrestrial
- Nilesat: Frequency: 11938; Polarization: V SR/FEC: 27500 5/6

Streaming media
- Sama TV Live: Free

Sama TV (Arabic: قناة سما الفضائية, lit. 'Sky') is an inactive Syrian private television station based in Damascus, launched on 24 January 2013 as a sister channel to the now-defunct Addounia TV.

It was widely regarded as supportive of the Ba'athist government and reportedly funded by businessman Mohammed Hamsho. Following the fall of the Assad regime on 8 December 2024, the channel became inactive and remains off air as of February 2026. Since April 2025 international sanctions placed on the channel were lifted

== Programs ==
Sama TV features a variety of general-interest programs. Many programs are shown on the channel; some of them are:

- Nabed al-Sharq (Pulse of the East, نبض الشرق)
- Ahwal al-Nas (Conditions of the people, أحوال الناس)
- Ajandet Hiwar (Dialogue Agenda, أجندة حوار)
- Rasamil (رساميل)
- Sabah al Khair (Good Morning, صباح الخير)
- Sama Café (سما كافيه)
- Tafasil (Details, تفاصيل)
- Classico (كلاسيكو)
- Eshha Sah (Live properly, عيشها صح)
- Ghazel al-Banat (cotton candy/the flirtation of girls, غزل البنات)
- Hashtag (هاش تاغ)
- Wahesh al-Buhaira (Lake monster, وحش البحيرة)
- Main News Bulletin (نشرة الأخبار الرئيسية)
- Local News Bulletin (نشرة الأخبار المحلية)

== Presenters ==
Sama TV's current presenters included:

News anchors: Nizar Al-Farra, Hanaa Al-Saleh, Ruaa Saker

Other anchors: Rana Koueter, Makhlouf Naama

Correspondents which are making also reports for Addounia TV: Ahmad al-Aaqel, Kinda al-Khidr, Ata Farhat, Kinana Allouche

Social media managers: Anas Othman, Firass Haider.
