= Addounia TV =

Television station based in Damascus, Syria

- Country: Syria
- Broadcast area: Syria
- Headquarters: Damascus, Syria

Programming
- Language: Arabic

Ownership
- Owner: Rami Makhlouf

History
- Launched: 23 March 2007
- Closed: 2015–2024

Links
- Website: http://www.addounia.tv/ at the Wayback Machine (archived 25 December 2015)

Addounia TV (Arabic: قناة الدنيا الفضائية, lit. 'The World') was a private television station based in Damascus, Syria, since 23 March 2007. The station was described by some western media as "semi-official" and a "mouthpiece of the government." Addounia TV was a sister channel of Sama TV. The channel was shut down in 2015.

== Programs ==
Prior to its shutdown, Addounia TV featured a variety of general-interest programs. News was aired in five daily bulletins: at 2:00 am, 11:00 am, 2:00 pm, 5:00 pm and 8:00 pm (Damascus time). Many other programs were shown on the channel, with some being:

- Sabah al Khair (Good Morning, صباح الخير)
- 7 Days
- Syrian Drama
- Shi Chic (something chic, شي شيك)
- All Sports
- Ain ala al Hadas (Eye on the event, عين على الحدث)
- Weekend
- Drama Zoom (دراما زووم)
- Cinema in
- Sa'a Houra (Free Hour, ساعة حرة)
- Main News Bulletin (نشرة الأخبار الرئيسية)
- from the newsroom (من غرفة الأخبار)
- Shabab Tube (Youth Tube, شباب تيوب)
- Sahtak bel Dounia (Your health worth a lot, صحتك بالدنيا) with Dr. Dana Al-Hamwi

== Presenters ==
Prior to the channel's shutdown in 2015, Addounia TV had several presenters responsible for its day-to-day programming. These presenters are:

News anchors: Wafa Al-Douiri (وفاء الدويري) and Majed Hermuz (مجد هرمز). Other anchors: Roaa Abbas (رؤى عباس), Evleen Haddad (ايفلين حداد), Kinda Asfoura (كندة عصفورة) and Reem Maarouf (ريم معروف).

Correspondents which are making also reports for Sama TV: Ahmad al-Aaqel (أحمد العاقل), Kinda al-Khidr (كندة الخضر), Ata Farhat (عطا فرحات), Diana Farfour (ديانا فرفور), Kinana Allouche (كنانة علوش), and Haidar Mustafa (حيدر مصطفى).

Notable past presenters now on Sama TV: Nizar Al-Farra (نزار الفرا), Hanaa Al-Saleh (هناء الصالح), Dr. Mohammed Abdel-Hamid (د.محمد عبد الحميد), Salem Al-Sheikh Bakri (سالم الشيخ بكري), Inas Fadhloun (إيناس فضلون), Toulin Mustafa (تولين مصطفى) and Reem Sherkawi (ريم شرقاوي).

Other notable past presenters: Salam Ishak (سلام اسحق), Micheline Azar (ميشلين عازار), Wafa Shabrouni (وفاء شبروني), Rania Thanoun (رانيا ذنون), Khansa Al-Hukmiya (خنساء الحكمية), Majed Musallam (مجد مسلم) and Sara Dabbous (سارة دبوس).

== During the Syrian Civil War ==
On 23 September 2011, the Council of the European Union added Addounia TV to its list of sanctioned individuals and entities, on the basis that Addounia TV had "incited violence against the civilian population in Syria. After one months on 20 October 2011 Addounia TV was interrupted on Hotbird. Addounia TV channel said that the sanctions imposed by the European Union contradict media freedom and the international conventions which protect the freedom of expression.

Addounia TV has suspended on 5 February 2012 its SMS 'Breaking News' service temporarily because it was hacked by the opposition.

The Arab League officially asked the satellite operators Arabsat and Nilesat to stop broadcasting Syrian media, including Addounia TV in June 2012. Syrian State News Agency, SANA, called the move to stop broadcasting a "misleading campaign launched against Syria."

President Bashar al-Assad gave an interview on 29 August 2012 to Addounia TV in which he talked on the local and regional developments. The whole interview is available on YouTube with English subtitles.

On 5 September 2012, Syrian Television Channels broadcast were broken off on Arabsat and Nilesat, including Addounia TV.

Journalist Suheil al-Ali from Addounia TV died on 4 January 2013 after suffering wounds from four days prior when opposition fighters opened fire on him in Damascus countryside while on his way home from work.

On 16 May 2013, the US Department of State included Addounia Television to the US blacklists of sanctions.

On 25 March 2014, Addounia Television broadcasting returned on Nilesat following the channel's more than 18 months suspension. The channel would later be shut down from either sometime in 2015 or 2024.

== Awards ==
- November 2010, Addounia TV won the Tetrapylon Palmyra Award for Best Satellite Channel.
