= Al-Iqtissadiya =

Syrian weekly newspaper

- Type: Weekly newspaper
- Owner(s): Rami Makhlouf
- Founded: 1 June 2001; 24 years ago
- Political alignment: Pro-government
- Language: Arabic
- Headquarters: Damascus
- Country: Syria
- Sister newspapers: Al Watan
- Website: Iqtissadiya

Al Iqtissadiya (Arabic: الاقتصادية; Economy) is a weekly Arabic newspaper published in Syria. The paper is one of the first privately owned publications in Syria. Its sister paper is Al Watan, a daily newspaper.

== History and profile ==
Al Iqtissadiya was launched in June 2001. The owner of the weekly is Rami Makhlouf, the cousin of the Syrian President Bashar Assad. The paper, based in Damascus, is published on Sundays. It focuses on financial and business news, including local news, international news, economical research and studies. As of 2012 the paper both exhibited a critical attitude towards slow progress in the economic and social fields and clearly supported the Assad regime's national and foreign policies. In 2005, the editor-in-chief of the paper was Waddah Abed Rabbo.

The weekly was the only Syrian publication that paid adequate tribute to Rafik Hariri, the assassinated prime minister of Lebanon in February 2005.
