= Sham TV =

- Country: Syria
- Broadcast area: Syria; Cairo; Dubai
- Headquarters: Damascus

Programming
- Language: Arabic

Ownership
- Owner: Mohammad Akram Al-Jundi

History
- Launched: 2005; 21 years ago

Links
- Webcast: TV Stream

Availability

Terrestrial
- Nilesat: 11555 V

Sham TV (Arabic: قناة شام الفضائية, romanized: Qanāt Shām al-Faḍāʾīyah, Sham refers to the historical region of Syria), also known as Cham TV, is the first private satellite channel in Syria owned by businessman Mohamed Akram Aljundi. It was launched in Damascus since 2005. The channel continued for a period of 8 months, and then it closed in 2006 under the pretext of lack of access to a written statement allowing them to exercise their activities. Then later it began re-broadcast from the city of Cairo in September 2007.
