= Freedom (Syrian newspaper) =

State-owned Syrian daily newspaper

Freedom (Al-Hurriya)
- Official logo
- Type: Daily newspaper
- Owner: Syrian government
- Founder(s): Tishreen Organization for Press and Publishing
- Publisher: Al Wahda institution
- Founded: 1975; 51 years ago
- Language: Arabic
- Headquarters: Damascus
- Country: Syria
- Sister newspapers: Syria Times; Al Thawra
- Website: Freedom

Freedom or Al-Hurriya (Arabic: الحرية, romanized: Al-Ḥurriyya, lit. 'Freedom') is one of the state-owned Arabic daily newspapers published in Syria. The daily is based in Damascus and has been in circulation since 1975.

== History and profile ==
Originally named Tishreen, after the Yom Kippur War in October 1973, the newspaper was first published in October 1975. It is a state-owned publication in addition to two other state-owned dailies, namely Al Baath and Al Thawra, which were launched earlier. Tishreen Organization for Press and Publishing is the former publisher of the daily. The company also published Syria Times, a defunct English daily and a current e-newspaper. Later Al Wahda institution became the publisher of both publications in addition to Al Thawra. In January 2025, the newspaper changed its name to Al-Hurriya (Freedom) a month after the fall of the Assad regime.

== Content and editors ==
One of the interviews published in Freedom was with Nimr Saleh, a dissident member of the Palestine Liberation Organization in 1983. The paper published a poem by Najah Al Attar, culture minister, which was written after the death of Hafez Assad's mother, Naisa Assad, in 1993. Mohammad Kheir Al Wadi, then editor-in-chief, wrote in January 2000 "Zionism created the Holocaust myth to blackmail and terrorize the world's intellectuals and politicians." By 2004 the paper became a platform to support the charities in the country along with Al Thawra. Although the daily is owned by the state, it had a critical stance on local news, especially in regard to corruption and mismanagement in 2012.

As of 2005 the editor-in-chief was Khalaf Al Jarrad who was appointed by Hafez Assad to the post in July 2001. Samira Al Masalmeh was named as the editor-in-chief of Tishreen in January 2012. She is the first female editor-in-chief in the country. Then Youshra Al Masry was named as its editor-in-chief.

== Readership and circulation ==
In 1997, Tishreen launched its website. The paper also has an English news portal, Syria Millennium, which is accessed through its website. In 1992 the paper sold 75,000 copies. Daily circulation of Tishreen was nearly 60,000 in the mid-2000s. The paper's online version was the 48th most visited website for 2010 in the MENA region.

== Incidents ==
The website of Tishreen was hacked by unknown groups in late April 2011. In December 2012, Naji Assaad, a journalist for the daily, was assassinated in Damascus allegedly by opposition forces who have been fighting against the Assad government since 2011.
