= Aleppo Today =

Syrian domestic television broadcaster

Aleppo Today قناة حلب اليوم
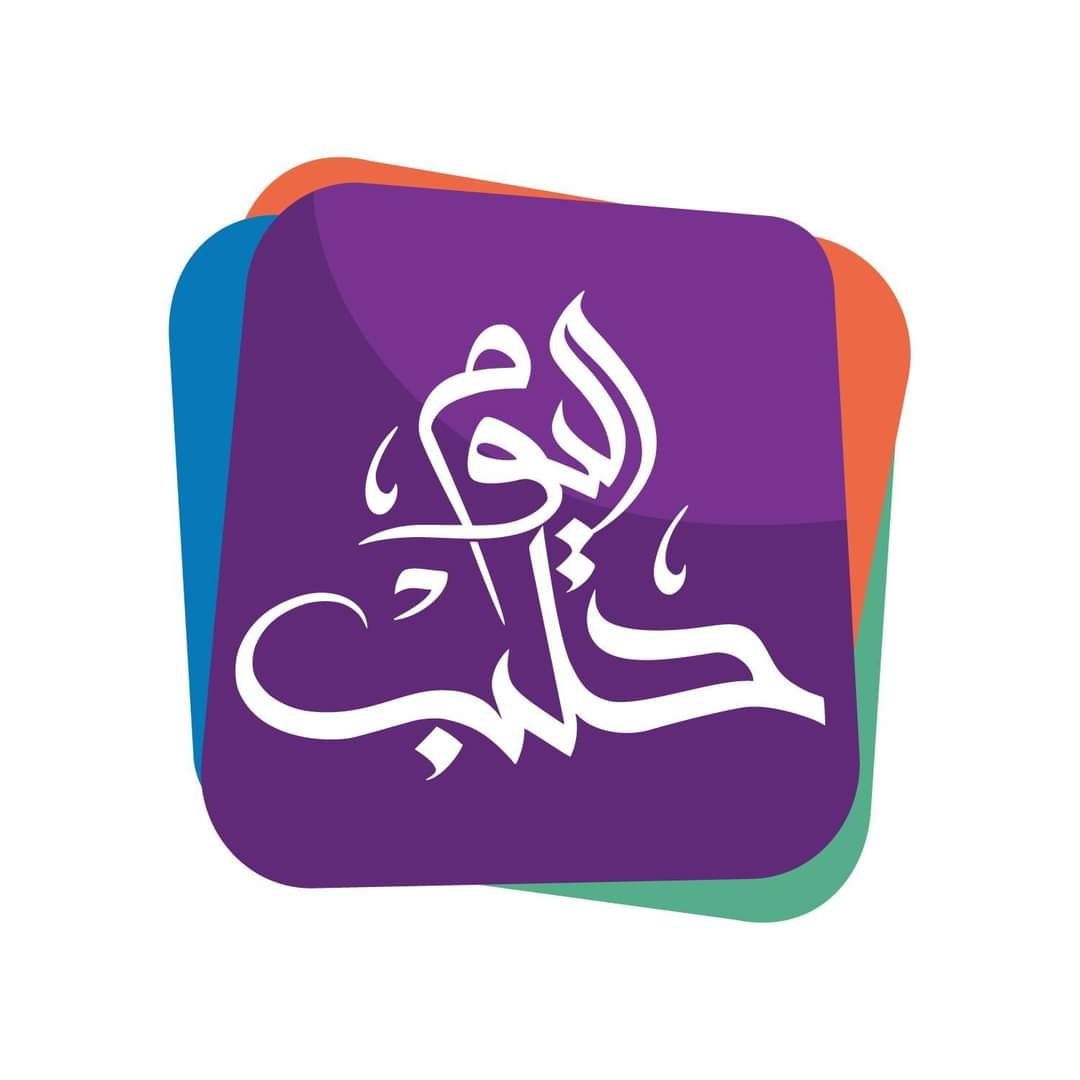
- Country: Syria
- Broadcast area: Syria; Worldwide (via internet)
- Headquarters: Istanbul, Turkey

Programming
- Language: Arabic
- Picture format: 576i (SDTV)

Ownership
- Parent: Aleppo Today Channel

History
- Launched: 1 December 2011; 14 years ago

Links
- Website: halabtodaytv.net

Availability

Terrestrial
- Eutelsat 8 West B: 11554 V 27500 (7/8)

Streaming media
- Halab Today TV: Watch live

Aleppo (Halab) Today (Arabic: قناة حلب اليوم) is a Syrian television news channel. The channel's broadcast features music and images with a news ticker running at the bottom of the screen that provides important updates to the citizens of Aleppo. The channel originally broadcast from Aleppo but in 2012 moved its operations outside of Syria to Istanbul, Turkey due to pressure from the Ba'athist regime. The channel broadcasts on Nilesat and online.

== Operations ==
The channel relies on a network of correspondents in and around Aleppo and a staff that works three shifts to provide 24-hour coverage, focusing particularly on military developments in the area.

== Staff ==
Many of the reporters and editors working for the channel have remained anonymous, but some of the known staff include a former editor Samir Kanjo and his replacement Feras Dibbeh.

== Funding ==
According to Dibbeh, the channel's funding comes from anonymous Aleppine businessman.
