= Al-Madina FM =

- Damascus; Syria
- Broadcast area: Most Syrian Cities
- Frequencies: 100.5 and 101.5 MHz

Programming
- Language: Arabic (mostly)
- Format: Arabic music (70%), English music, Hit music (30%), News, Current Affairs

History
- First air date: 2005

Links
- Website: almadinafm.com

Al-Madina FM ("The City FM") is a private Syrian radio station based in Damascus. It broadcasts a mix of Arabic music along with hit music.

== History ==
Al-Madina FM was launched in 2005, becoming the first Syrian private radio station. Before this, only government and clandestine stations were broadcast.

== Broadcasting ==
With constant emphasis on various music, Madina FM has become one of the mainstream radio broadcasters of Syria. Al-Madina FM is known across the country and is a very popular radio station whose programs are full of music and playlists of energetic songs of popular Syrian singers.
