= Syrian Medical TV =

Defunct Syrian television channel

- Country: Syria
- Broadcast area: Syria; Russia; China; Iran
- Network: ORTAS
- Headquarters: Damascus, Syria

Programming
- Language: Arabic

Ownership
- Owner: RTV Syria

History
- Closed: 2016

Links
- Website: http://syriamedical.tv/ (defunct)

Syrian Medical TV (Arabic القناة الطبية السورية الفضائية) was a television station based in Damascus, Syria.
