= Radio Damascus =

Syrian national and former international radio station

Radio Damascus إذاعة دمشق
- Damascus; Syria
- Broadcast area: Syria; Middle East (Nilesat 201); Worldwide (Internet stream)
- Frequencies: 95.1 MHz (Damascus, Deir ez-Zor and Latakia Governorates); 95.2 MHz (Qalamoun Mountains); 95.3 MHz (Homs and Rif Dimashq Governorate); 59.9 MHz (Aleppo, Hama and Tartus Governorates)

Programming
- Language: Arabic

Ownership
- Owner: State-owned (GART)

History
- First air date: 3 February 1947; 79 years ago

Links
- Webcast: URL Listen Live
- Website: damasradio.fm

Radio Damascus (Arabic: إذاعة دمشق, romanized: Idhāʿat Dimashq) is the main and oldest national radio station of Syria, operating under the state broadcaster GART. The station primarily broadcasts Arabic-language programming nationwide on medium-wave and FM frequencies and on satellite feed on Nilesat 201 and worldwide on internet live stream. In addition, Radio Damascus has offered multilingual content via web streaming, including programs in Arabic, English, French, German, Hebrew, Russian, Spanish, and Turkish.

== History ==
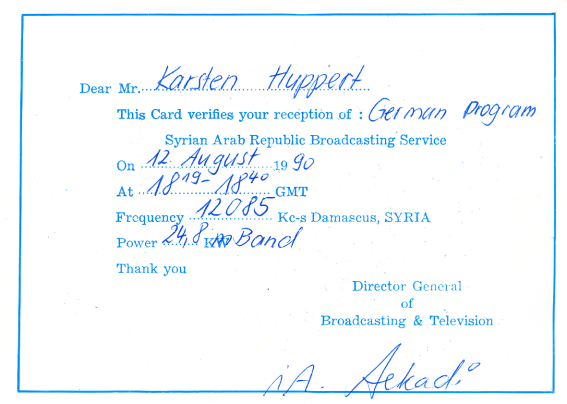
Radio Damascus (Syrian Arab Republic Broadcasting Service) QSL card, 1990.

Radio Damascus began international broadcasting in 1957, targeting audiences outside Syria through medium-wave and shortwave transmissions. Between the late Cold War period until 2013, the station served as one of Syria's principal external broadcasting outlets. From the 2000s until 2013, Radio Damascus expanded its distribution using satellite transmission, including broadcasts via the Russian satellite Ekspress-AM22. International radio transmissions were gradually reduced and eventually discontinued in 2013.

Until 8 December 2024, Radio Damascus' programming largely reflected and promoted the policies of the Syrian ba'athist government under the Assad family.

Following the fall of the Assad regime, Radio Damascus ceased broadcasting. Under the authority of the Syrian transitional government, the station was officially relaunched on 4 February 2026.

== See also ==
- List of radio stations in Syria
- Al-Souriya TV
