= The New Arab =

Pan-Arab media outlet headquartered in London

The New Arab / Al-Araby Al-Jadeed

- Al-Araby Al-Jadeed print edition on 7 April 2025
- Native name: العربي الجديد
- Type: Private company
- Industry: News media
- Founded: March 2014; 12 years ago
- Founder: Azmi Bishara
- Headquarters: London, United Kingdom
- Owner: Fadaat Media
- Website: www.newarab.com (English) www.alaraby.co.uk (Arabic)

Al-Araby Al-Jadeed (Arabic: العربي الجديد) is a London-based pan-Arab news outlet owned by Qatari company Fadaat Media. It launched an Arabic-language website in March 2014 and an Arabic language daily newspaper in September 2014. The English version of its website is known as The New Arab.

In 2015, Fadaat launched Al Araby Television Network as a counterweight to Al Jazeera and its perceived bias towards the Muslim Brotherhood in Egypt.

== History ==
Amid tensions between Qatari emir Tamim bin Hamad Al Thani and the director of Al Jazeera, Tamim launched Al-Araby Al-Jadeed, headed by the emir's closest advisor Azmi Bishara. According to Professor Lina Khatib, Al Jazeera's association with the Muslim Brotherhood and its reputation as a mouthpiece for the Syrian revolution had hurt the channel's credibility. With the launch, Tamim was seeking to establish a voice independent of his parents.

Al-Araby Al-Jadeed was officially launched in March 2014 as a new media project funded by Qatari private holding company Fadaat Media. It launched Arabic-language website Al-Araby Al-Jadeed in March 2014 and an Arabic language daily newspaper with the same name in September 2014. It also has an English website known as The New Arab.

Dr. Azmi Bishara, a Palestinian Christian based in Doha and an ex-member of the Israeli Knesset, runs Al-Araby Al-Jadeed. Al-Araby Al-Jadeed now operates globally, with more than 150 staff in three offices, based in Beirut, Doha and London.

Journalists for Al-Araby Al-Jadeed, including Bishara, were targeted by hackers affiliated with Project Raven, a UAE initiative to target the mobile phones of media figures the UAE believed were supported by Qatar.

== Editorial position ==
Bishara described the outlet as "relatively independent" in the context of the Arab world. According to Bishara, "Sometimes the newspaper might be sensitive about what not to say, because you are not there to provoke the people that finance you." According to Professor Lina Khatib, Al-Araby Al-Jadeed is meant to be a rival to pro-Muslim Brotherhood Al Jazeera as a major outlet for the Qatari state's views.

Since 2013, many Egyptian journalists have taken employment at Arab media outlets such as Al-Araby Al-Jadeed, funded by Qatar and critical of the Egyptian government.

Amidst the controversy after the al-Ahli Arab Hospital explosion during the Gaza war, The New Arab's Arabic-language edition blamed the Israel Defense Forces (IDF) and denounced then-U.S. president Joe Biden for endorsing IDF's claim that the blast was caused by a Palestinian Islamic Jihad rocket.

== Ownership and finances ==
The outlet is owned by Qatar-based Fadaat Media Ltd. Abdulrahman Elshayyal is the newspaper's CEO. Fadaat Media is an Arab media investment company.

== See also ==
- Al-Monitor
- Asharq Al-Awsat
- Middle East Eye
- Middle East Monitor
