= Al-Souriya TV =

Syrian state-owned television channel

Al-Souriya TV السورية
- Country: Syria
- Broadcast area: Syria; Worldwide (via satellite and internet)
- Headquarters: Umayyad Square, Damascus, Syria

Programming
- Language: Arabic
- Picture format: 16:9 1080i (HD)

Ownership
- Owner: GART
- Key people: Bani Faroun (director)
- Sister channels: Syrian News Channel; Radio Damascus (Television Stream)

History
- Launched: 1995; 31 years ago (original); 19 February 2026; 7 months ago (relaunch)
- Closed: 15 December 2024; 21 months ago (original)

Links
- Website: alsouriya.tv

Availability

Terrestrial
- Digital: DVB-T2
- Nilesat 201: 11938 V 30000 (5/6)
- Es'hail 2: 11430 H 27500 (2/3)

Al-Souriya TV (Arabic: السورية, romanized: Al-Sūriyya, lit. 'The Syrian'), formerly known as Syrian Satellite Channel (Arabic: القناة الفضائية السورية, romanized: al-Qanāh al-Faḍā’īyah al-Sūriyya), Syrian TV (Arabic: السورية, romanized: Al-Sūriyya) and Syria TV is a free-to-air public television channel, owned by the Syrian General Authority for Radio and Television and broadcast nationwide on digital terrestrial television (DTT) and throughout the world on various satellites. The channel specializes primarily in general entertainment. The television station has been based in Damascus, Syria since 1995.

== History ==
=== Syrian revolution and civil war ===
During the Syrian revolution and civil war, the channel was primarily used by the Ba'athist-led regime as propaganda.

On 26 May 2013, opposition forces attacked the Syria TV team near al-Daba'a village in the countryside of al-Qusayr in Homs province, injuring cameraman Asem al-Shaar.

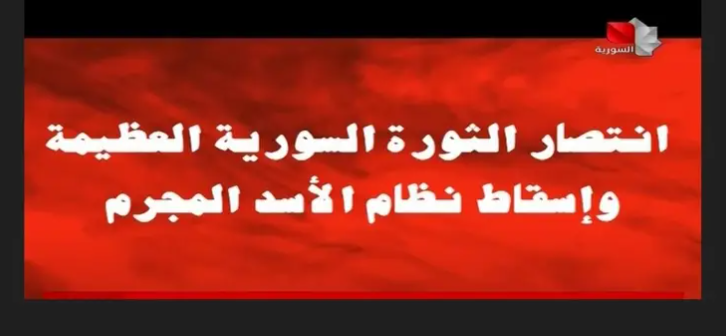
"Victory of the great Syrian revolution and the fall of the criminal al-Assad regime" on Syria TV after the fall of Damascus. This was its sole broadcast for several hours.

On 8 December 2024, at 08:30, amid the fall of Damascus during the Syrian opposition offensives, opposition forces took control of the channel and announced the fall of the Assad regime live on-air.

On 15 December 2024, the channel broadcast was suspended on digital terrestrial and on satellite feed.

=== Relaunch ===
During Syria's transition period, the television station temporarily suspended broadcasting, while its official website also entered a redesign phase.

In mid-January 2026, Syria TV resumed transmission via the Nilesat 201 satellite on the frequency 11938 V. At that time, the channel broadcast a static image displaying its logo and was reported to be preparing a full relaunch of its programming in a revamped format, scheduled to coincide with the beginning of Ramadan.

The channel officially relaunched on 19 February 2026 at 10:00 AST, as Al-Souriya TV.

== Programming ==
Al-Souriya primarily broadcasts a mix of general thematic programming, news, talk shows, cultural and entertainment programming, and docuseries among others. As of 2026, the programs that are currently airing on Al-Souriya are:

=== News ===
- Morning Shine
- Syrian Sabah (صباح السورية)
- 7:45 PM News Bulletin (نشرة الثامنة إلا ربع)

=== Current affiairs ===
- In Context (في السياق)
- People of Determination (أهل العزم)
- The File (الملف)

=== Talk shows ===
- They Ask You (برنامج يستفتونك)

=== Drama ===
- Hammam Alward (مسلسل حمام الورد)
- Offer and Request (مسلسل عرض وطلب)

=== Informational ===
- Medical Hashtag (هاشتاغ طبي)
- Mirror (مرآة)
- Moments (لحظات)

=== Cultural ===
- Discover Syria (اكتشف سوريا)
- Eid and Siran (عيد وسيران)
- I Say (أقوم قيلا)
- On a Quiet Fire (ع نار هادية)
- Ramadan Notes (نفحات رمضانية)
- Service Program (برنامج سرفيس)
- Surrology (سوريالوجي)
- Syria's Roots (جذور سوريا)
- Television and People (التلفزيون والناس)

=== Docuseries ===
- Generation of Liberation (جيل التحرير)
- The Journey of a Lifetime (رحلة العمر)

=== Children's programming ===
- The Storyteller (الحكواتي)

== Logos ==
Logo used from 2018 to 9 December 2024

Logo used from 10 December 2024 to 15 December 2024

Logo used from January 2026 to 18 February 2026

Logo from 19 February 2026

== See also ==
- Television in Syria
