= Talaqie TV =

- Country: Syria
- Broadcast area: Syria
- Network: ORTAS
- Headquarters: Damascus

Programming
- Language: Arabic

Ownership
- Owner: RTV Syria

History
- Launched: 6 October 2012; 13 years ago
- Closed: 17 October 2016; 9 years ago

Links
- Website: www.talaqie.net

Availability

Streaming media
- Talaqie TV Live (defunct): Free

Talaqie TV (Arabic قناة تلاقي, literal translation "Meeting") was a television station based in Damascus, Syria since 6 October 2012. The Ministry of Information and ORTAS launched on 20 May 2013 officially the satellite TV channel Talaqie which provides coverage of national, politics, social and economic issues. The TV Channel was shut down in 2016.
