= Syrian News Channel =

Syrian News Channel الإخبارية السورية
- Country: Syria
- Broadcast area: Syria; Worldwide (via internet)
- Network: General Authority for Radio and Television
- Headquarters: Damascus, Syria

Programming
- Language: Arabic
- Picture format: 16:9 1080i (HD)

Ownership
- Owner: GART
- Key people: Jamil Srour (director)
- Sister channels: Al-Souriya TV; Radio Damascus (Television Stream)

History
- Launched: 15 December 2010; 15 years ago (original); 5 May 2025; 17 months ago (relaunch)
- Closed: 8 December 2024; 21 months ago (original)

Links
- Website: alikhbariah.com

Availability

Terrestrial
- Digital: DVB-T2
- Nilesat 201: 11938 V 27500 (5/6)
- Es'hail 2: 11430 H 27500 (2/3)

Streaming media
- Syrian News Channel Live: Free

Syrian News Channel (Arabic: الإخبارية السورية, romanized: al-ʾIḫbāriyyah al-Sūrīyah), also known as Alikhbaria Syria or Al-Ikhbariyah Syria, is a Syrian free-to-air television news channel owned and operated by the state-owned public broadcaster General Authority for Radio and Television.

It was launched on 15 December 2010, and would later be rebranded on 5 May 2025, after its broadcasts were suspended for a few months following the fall of the Assad regime in December 2024. It broadcasts nationwide on digital terrestrial television (DTT) and on various satellites.

== History ==
=== During the Syrian civil war ===
On 12 June 2012, a car of the Syrian News Channel became the target of an armed attack by a group of gunmen in the town of Al-Haffa near the city of Latakia. Syrian News Channel correspondent Mazen Mohammad was hit in his hand while cameraman Fadi Yakoub was hit in his chest. Both journalists were immediately admitted to the National Hospital in Latakia. According to journalist Mazen Mohammad, an armed group opened fire towards their car while trying to cover the events in Al-Haffa near the National Hospital.

In the early morning of 27 June 2012, a group of gunmen attacked the main building of the Syrian News Channel in Damascus countryside. Three staff members of the Syrian News Channel and four security guards were killed during the attack on the headquarters of the TV station. The three killed staff members are, Zaid Kahel, Mohammad Shamma and Sami Abu Amin. The official Syrian Arab News Agency (SANA) announced that the assailants had also ransacked the offices of the TV station during the attack that was carried out at the early hours of the day. The assailants stormed the offices of Syrian News Channel, planted explosives in the studios and blew them up along with the equipment. Five buildings in the complex were destroyed in the attack. The attacks have been attributed to al Nusra, an al-Qaeda affiliated extremist group.

An armed group kidnapped on 10 August 2012, four team members of the Syrian News Channel in al-Tall area of Damascus Countryside. The crew members are, Journalist Yara Saleh, Cameraman Abdullah Tabreh, Cameraman Assistant Hatem Abu Yehya and the driver Hussam Imad. However, the armed forces freed the team seven days later. Three colleagues were released except of Hatem Abu Yehya who was killed by the armed groups.

On 5 September 2012, Syrian television channels broadcast were broken off on Arabsat and Nilesat, including Syrian News Channel.

On 27 September 2012, the Syrian News Channel was hijacked for about 90 seconds. Its perpetrators remain unknown..

Mohammed al-Ashram, cameraman for Syrian News Channel was shot dead in the eastern province of Deir Ezzor on 10 October 2012.

President Bashar al-Assad gave an interview on 17 April 2013, to Syrian News Channel.

On 27 May 2013, Yara Abbas, a prominent female Syrian war reporter for the Syrian News Channel, was killed by rebels near the military air base of al-Dabaa in the central province of Homs. The cameraman Osama Dayoub and driver Badr Awad were injured in the attack.

=== Post-Ba'athist Syria ===
The channel suspended all of its broadcasts after the fall of the Assad regime on 8 December 2024.

On 20 April, Ministry of Information minister Hamza al-Mustafa announced that the channel would be returning on 5 May 2025 after getting the "support and guidance" from president Ahmed al-Sharaa. Head of the Syrian News Channel, Jamil Srour, said that the channel wanted to return on 13 March to celebrate the 14th anniversary of the Syrian Revolution but couldn't because of sanctions against the General Authority for Radio and Television (GART). On 22 April 2025, GART signed the contract with Nilesat to bring the Syrian News Channel back to the Egyptian satellites, one day after signing the contract with ِQatari Es'hailSat.

On 5 May 2025, the channel relaunched at 5:00 PM.

== Headquarters ==
The Syrian News Channel primarily hosts its broadcasting in a large studio in Drousha alongside a smaller studio, which can be hooked up to the headquarters for down-the-line interviews, located in Gomarek Square in Damascus to accommodate live guests.

== See also ==
- Television in Syria
