= Massaya TV =

- Country: Syria; United Arab Emirates
- Broadcast area: Nationwide
- Headquarters: Damascus, Syria; Dubai, United Arab Emirates

Programming
- Language: Arabic

History
- Launched: 1 May 2007; 19 years ago

Links
- Website: www.massayacom.com

Massaya TV (Arabic: قناة مسايا الفضائية) is a private Syrian satellite television station based in Damascus and Dubai. It is specializing in broadcasting events, concerts, and weddings particularly in Syria and the Arab world. Massaya TV offers also interviews with specialists in beauty and make-up and also specialists in art lighting and photography. It was officially launched on 1 May 2007.

== Programs ==
One of the most important programs produced by the channel in Syria are:

- Massaya al-Kheir Suriya (مسايا الخير سوريا)
- Al-Afrah wa Al-Araas (Weddings and Weddings, الافراح والاعراس)
- Akhbar Faan min Suriya (Art News from Syria, أخبار فن من سوريا)
- Hafalat Ayad el-Milad wa el-Munasabat (Christmas concerts and events, حفلات اعياد الميلاد والمناسبات)

The channel also produces programs in Egypt like:

- Marah fi Farah (مرح في فرح)
- Massaya al-Kheir min al-Qahira (مسايا الخير من القاهرة)
- Al-Naharda Farahi (النهاردة فرحي)

As well as programs of Dubai Events and Arab Weddings from different places.

== Station's offices ==
Massaya TV has many offices around the Arab world, most notably in Syria, where the main headquarters are located. Other offices are in Dubai, Egypt, Lebanon, and Jordan.
