= Channel 2 (Syria) =

Channel 2 (Arabic: القناة الثانية) was a Syrian television channel launched on 13 March 1985. It has different schedules for different governorates. It has a sport, family and health focus within its regional variants. The channel can only be seen in Syria. Channel 2 was shut down on 11 November 2012.
