= Syria Times =

Syrian English-language online newspaper

- Type: Online newspaper
- Founder(s): Tishreen Organization for Press and Publishing
- Ceased publication: 2008 (as print version)
- Political alignment: Ba'athism
- Language: English
- Headquarters: Damascus
- Sister newspapers: Al-Hurriya
- Website: Syria Times

The Syria Times (Arabic: سيريا تايمز) is an English-language Syrian daily e-newspaper.

== Profile ==
The Syria Times was published by Tishreen Organization for Press and Publishing, a government-owned company that publishes the leading Arabic daily Al-Hurriya. As of 2000, these two newspapers had a circulation of 5,000 and 60,000, respectively.

== Condemnation of Iraq war ==
In March and April 2003, The Syria Times received some international attention due to its harsh condemnation of the US-led war against Iraq, well in line with the official Syrian discourse in the debates of the UN Security Council. For instance, The Irish Times noticed that “The Syria Times attacked Bush's "unholy war" and his "imperialist strategy to control the Arab oil-rich region””.

In an interview with The Middle East magazine, Fuad Mardood, editor of The Syria Times, said: “I cannot imagine that there is anyone in Syria who wants to attack our policy (…) You can find people who have personal motives who may attack the system, but it is only to achieve personal goals.”

In late May 2008, Mohammad Agha was released from his position as editor-in-chief of Syria Times. The decision was apparently made by the Minister for Information Mohsen Bilal. A history of differences between the two had been reported. The official reason for Agha's termination was failure to catch a mistake regarding the caption accompanying a photograph.

== Closure ==
On 8 June 2008, The Syria Times was closed for an indefinite period of time. Various reasons were given, chief amongst them issues relating to the contract for the new editor-in-chief. A report on the viability of the Syria Times was delivered to the People's Assembly (the Syrian parliament) in July, and assistance was requested to restart the newspaper.

Following lengthy delays, a 2-year agreement (since extended) was signed with the United Nations Development Programme (UNDP) to assist the newspaper to the tune of $900,000 used for analysis, restructuring, training and equipment. No official date has been set for recommencing publishing of the Syria Times.

== Relaunch as E-newspaper ==
On 6 October 2012, the then minister of information Omran al-Zoubi inaugurated the first Syrian e-newspaper "Syria Times". The launching coincided with the country's celebrations of the 39th anniversary of the Liberation War of October, led by the late President Hafez al-Assad.

On the importance of the re-launching the "Syria Times" e-newspaper, Minister al-Zou'bi said: "We are in need for new tools to communicate with English-speaking communities, as to address the people of these communities and present our views and causes the way they understand, and not the way we want to."

Director General of al-Wehda Press Foundation, Khalaf al-Meftah, expressed hope that the re-launching of the Syria Times would be a further step forward by the Syrian Media, in continuation of the ongoing tireless media efforts as to disseminate the reality of the events on the ground, and as to expose media outlets of fabrications and lies.

On his part, the Syria Times editor-in-chief, Mohammad Abdo Al-Ibrahim, underlined that the daily, at the directive of information minister, Omran al-Zou'bi, would adopt in its media coverage the main principles and ethics of journalism, including those of transparency, credibility, and objectivity. The main contents of the daily focus on issues and topics related to national reconciliation, dialogue, society, politics, Syrian Expatriates, environment, tourism, archaeology, sports, economy, culture, as well on other interactive varied topic and issues of debate. added Al-Ibrahim.
