= Orient News =

Syrian television network based in Istanbul, Turkey

- Orient News
- Industry: Mass media
- Founded: 2008
- Founder: Ghassan Aboud
- Defunct: 21 November 2023
- Headquarters: Istanbul, Turkey
- Area served: MENA
- Products: TV and radio
- Services: Orient News Channel, Orient Radio, Orient Net, Orient Vision
- Owner: Ghassan Aboud
- Website: www.orient-news.net

Orient News (in Arabic تلفزيون أورينت) was a Syrian media group owned by Syrian businessman, journalist and opposition figure Ghassan Aboud, based in Istanbul, providing news service to the Middle East with a focus on Syria. It ceased to exist on 21 November 2023.

== History ==
Orient Media Network started with Orient News TV. After a study, it was evident that there were no specialized satellite channels specified for the Syrian viewer. Private non-Syrian channels typically used dialects of Arabic not used in Syrian society, which varies socially and culturally. The owner of the group, Ghassan Aboud launched media projects for television, film and radio production, which were eventually broadcast in several countries: Orient Vision for educational broadcasts, the Orient Net website and Orient radio.

Plans for launching of a channel were disclosed by Abboud end of 2007, and test broadcasts started by May 2008 with logo of the station and music from Fairuz. Official broadcasts and programming started on 2 February 2009. Programming is a mixture of Syrian and international news, political, cultural, social and sports programs and television series, comedies, reality shows and long feature films. The station was broadcasting through Damascus when Syrian Internal Security Forces raided the station on 27 July 2010, stopping its broadcasts and putting pressure on station employees to leave their jobs. Ghassan Abboud moved the operations where he resumed broadcasting. Signals of the broadcasts can be received on both Nilesat and Arabsat and online through the website of the station.

In 2017, channel was expelled from its residence in the UAE. Emirati authorities asked Ghassan Abboud to close it, otherwise all his money and property will be confiscated. On 21 November 2023, the owner of Orient News, Ghassan Aboud, announced the definitive closure of the media. The decision to close includes all platforms: TV, news and programs department, social media and radio and everything produced in its office in Istanbul, which includes more than 80 employees.

== Orient News TV channel ==
Orient News
- Country: Turkey
- Broadcast area: MENA
- Headquarters: Istanbul, Turkey

Programming
- Languages: Arabic, Kurdish

Ownership
- Owner: Ghassan Aboud

History
- Launched: February 2009
- Closed: 21 November 2023

Links
- Website: www.orient-news.net

Availability

Streaming media
- Orient News YouTube
- Orient News Live

Orient News TV was based in Turkey, and broadcast to Syria, Jordan, Oman, Saudi Arabia and United Arab Emirates.

Orient News TV aimed to address Syrian viewers in specific and the Arab world in general, with cultural and entertainment programming as well as information and news.

Orient TV opened in Damascus in February 2009, employing 149 Syrians. However, the government soon had doubts about having granted a license to Orient TV, and in July 2009 Syrian security forces raided Orient TV's offices. As a consequence, Orient TV moved to Dubai. The station began broadcasting outside of Syria with coverage of the first civil courts established in Idlib province.

The station presented a series of varied programs, including news, cultural, political, social, and children's programs.

== Live Point art production ==
Live Point Foundation was a service supplying foreign and Arabic channels with economic, social and political news and current events in the Arab region. Services include producing and broadcasting news reports, various news and studio and live windows services, as well as drama and film production, different TV shows, dubbing, subtitling and distribution. The headquarters of the foundation was in Dubai - United Arab Emirates and had affiliates in both Jordan and Istanbul.

== Orient Net website ==
Orient Net was pro-Syrian opposition electronic newspaper, related to Orient Media Group, concerned with Syrian affairs on all political, economic and social levels. In addition, it specifies a space for the news in addition to several divisions such as Orient forums, weekly columns, culture and art news. The site specifies an important division to Orient TV shows.

The site depends on a group of expert journalists and writers in such field.

The site aimed to be editorially independent; it does not follow any of the political trends and international and regional alliances.

The website was hacked by ISIS on 11 February 2015, with direct threats targeting the owner and employees of the institution.

== Orient Vision Studies Center ==
Orient Vision Center was specialized in studies and research related to Syria. It aimed to provide studies of identity to country where different communities and ethnic groups coexist for so long.

The Center was concerned with field studies that attempt to monitor the daily variables that affect the Syrian life inside and outside the country, through solid scientific and academy means, such as researchers working on ground and the direct contact with the sources of the study, approving surveys and design research questionnaires and analyzing them.

The Center organized research workshops with senior specialists regarding topics linked to the Syrian status in order to achieve an objective vision that helps to recognize the quick developments of real life in Syria. The priority of the Center was specialized research seminars and open forums regarding specific topics, with invited guests including specialized researchers.

== Ownership ==
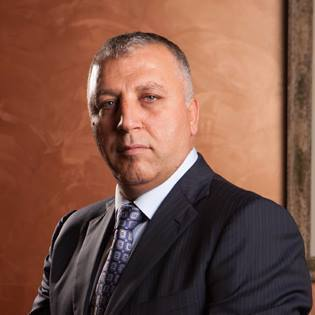
Ghassan Aboud the founder, owner of Orient Media Network

The project's founder and owner is a Syrian businessman, Mohammad Ghassan Aboud, born in 1967. He holds a bachelor's degree in media from Damascus University in 1991. He left Syria for the United Arab Emirates at the beginning of the 1990s, and worked in public relations in the Abu Dhabi Engineers Association Branch, and was then Media Officer in the Emirates Equestrian Federation and Race.

Later he moved to the business world and founded the Ghassan Aboud Foundation for Vehicles, an organisation for international automotive re-export. The number of countries that deal with the institution exceeded one hundred, after which he added new groups with additional activities to become Ghassan Aboud Group.

In 2008, he established his media project where the first phase included launching satellite channel addressing Arab families in general, and Syrian households in particular, taking into consideration the Arab youth generation that forms 60% of the total population. The establishment of Live Point TV Production Foundation, followed by Orient Net Website, Radio Orient and Orient Center for Studies, also accompanied the TV establishment.
