= Nilesat 201 =

Egyptian communications satellite

- Mission type: Communications
- Operator: Nilesat
- COSPAR ID: 2010-037A
- SATCAT no.: 36830
- Mission duration: 15 years

Spacecraft properties
- Bus: Spacebus 4000B2
- Manufacturer: Thales Alenia Space
- Launch mass: 3,200 kilograms (7,100 lb)
- Power: 5,700 watts

Start of mission
- Launch date: 4 August 2010, 20:59 UTC
- Rocket: Ariane 5ECA V196
- Launch site: Kourou ELA-3
- Contractor: Arianespace

Orbital parameters
- Reference system: Geocentric
- Regime: Geostationary
- Longitude: 7° West
- Perigee altitude: 35,765 kilometres (22,223 mi)
- Apogee altitude: 35,819 kilometres (22,257 mi)
- Inclination: 0.04 degrees
- Period: 23.93 hours
- Epoch: 29 October 2013, 04:04:54 UTC

Transponders
- Band: 24 Ku-band (Linear); 4 Ka-band (Circular)
- Bandwidth: 33 MHz, 54 MHz
- Coverage area: MENA

Nilesat 201, is an Egyptian communications satellite, which was launched on 4 August 2010.

Nilesat 201 will enable the Egyptian satellite operator Nilesat to deliver digital Direct to Home (DTH) TV and radio broadcasting and high-speed data transmission services to North Africa and the Middle East starting in September 2010. It was built by Thales Alenia Space in the Cannes Mandelieu Space Center, and is based on the Spacebus 4000B2 satellite bus. It will be operated in geosynchronous orbit, at a longitude of 7° West. The spacecraft has a design life of 15 years and a mass at launch of 3.2 tonnes. It is powered by solar arrays which will generate 5.9 kilowatts of electricity at the end of the spacecraft's design life. It will carry 40 transponders, of which 24 will be K_{u} band for broadcasting, and 4 will be K_{a} band. Nilesat 201 was launched by an Ariane 5ECA rocket at 20:59 UTC on 4 August 2010.
