= Outline of Syria =

Country in Western Asia

The Flag of Syria

The Emblem of Syria

The location of Syria

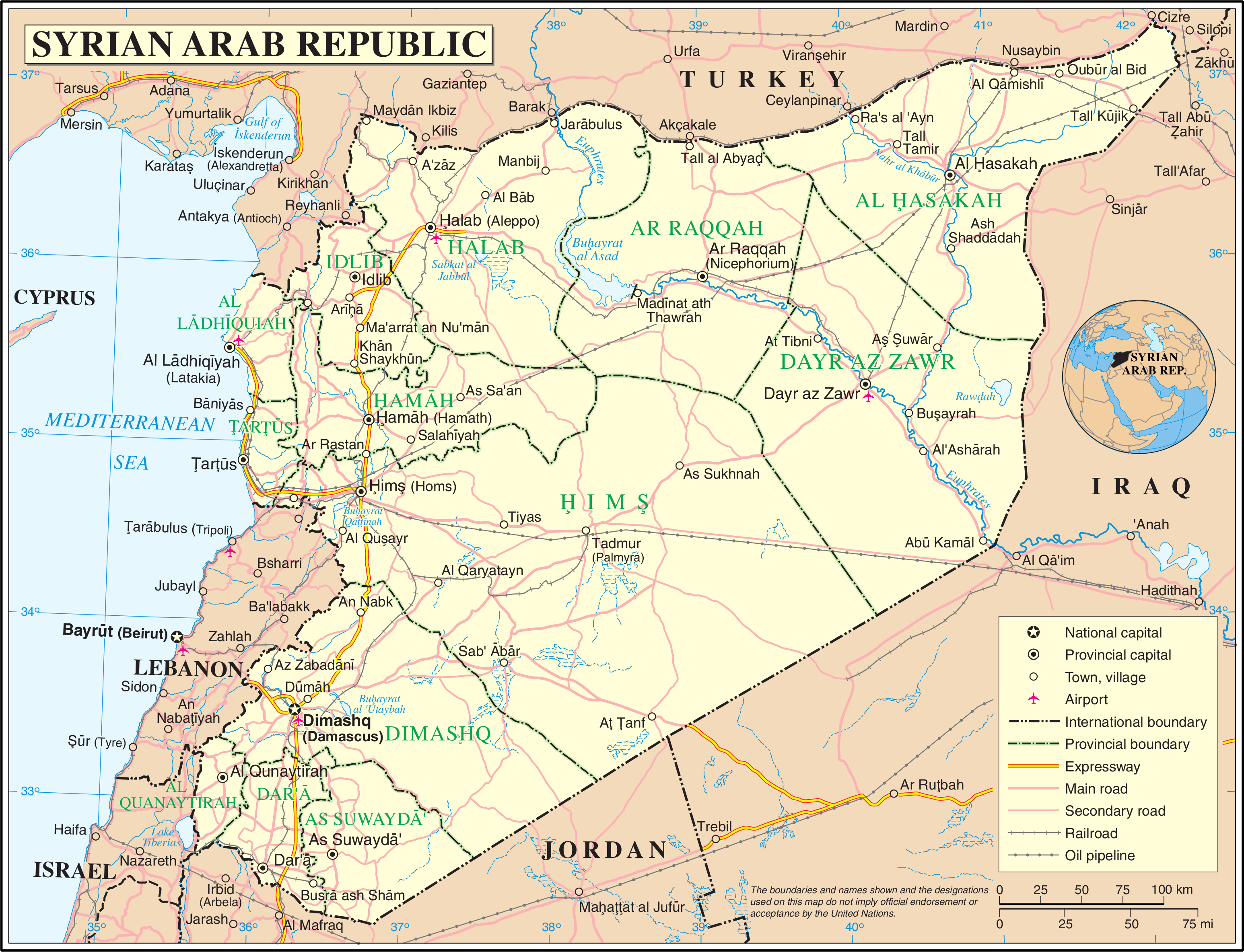
An enlargeable map of the Syrian Arab Republic

The following outline is provided as an overview of and topical guide to Syria:

Syria – country in West Asia, that borders Lebanon and the Mediterranean Sea to the west, Turkey to the north, Iraq to the east, Jordan to the south and Israel to the southwest. Civilization in Syria was one of the most ancient on earth. Syria is part of the Fertile Crescent, and from approximately 10,000 BCE it was one of the centers of Neolithic culture where agriculture and cattle breeding appeared for the first time in the world. Over the millennia, Syria has been conquered and settled by many different peoples. A country of fertile plains, high mountains and deserts, it is home to diverse ethnic and religious groups, including Assyrians, Kurds, Turkmens, Circassians, Armenians, Greeks, Arameans (of Maaloula and Jubb'adin), Black people of Yarmouk Basin, Romani, Druze, Alawite, Christians, Shias and Sunnis. The latter make up the majority of the population.

In 2011, Syria was embroiled in civil war in the wake of uprisings (considered an extension of the Arab Spring, the mass movement of revolutions and protests in the Arab world) against Assad and the neo-Ba'athist government. In 2024, the Assad regime was toppled by several opposition militias and organizations. As of 2025, the country is led by Ahmed al-Sharaa and a provisional government, which aims to lead a transitional period of up to five years.

== General reference ==
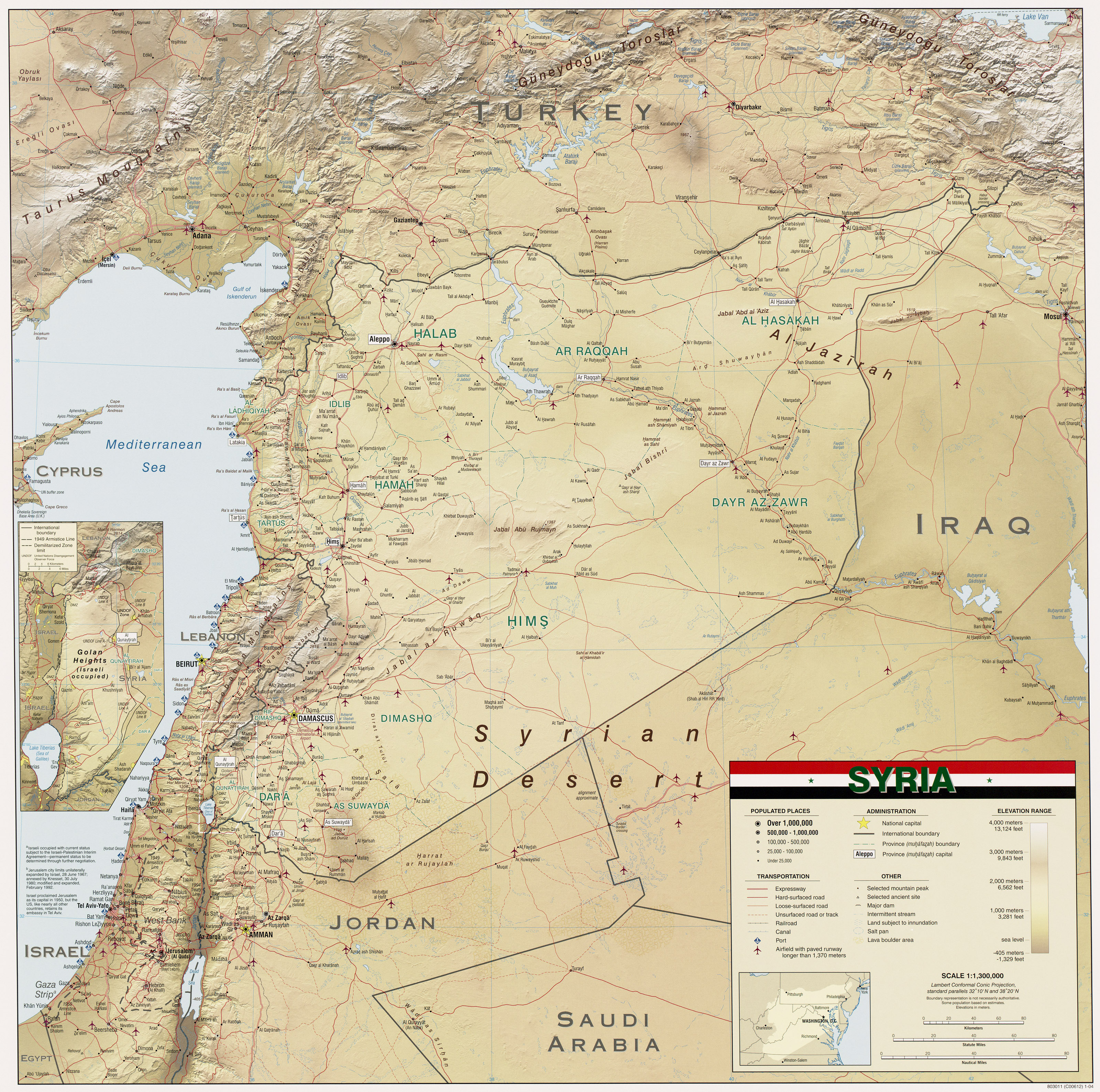
An enlargeable relief map of Syria

- Pronunciation: /ˈsɪ.ri.ə/; Arabic: سُورِيَا, romanized: Sūriyā [ˈsuːrja] (officially the Syrian Arab Republic; Arabic: اَلْجُمْهُورِيَّةُ ٱلْعَرَبِيَّةُ ٱلْسُوْرِيَّة, romanized: al-Jumhūriyyah al-ʿArabiyyah as-Sūriyyah)
- Common English country name: Syria
- Official English country name: Syrian Arab Republic
- Common endonym(s): List of countries and capitals in native languages
- Official endonym(s): List of official endonyms of present-day nations and states
- Adjectival(s): Syrian
- Demonym(s): Syrians
- Etymology: Name of Syria
- International rankings of Syria
- ISO country codes: SY, SYR, 760
- ISO region codes: See ISO 3166-2:SY
- Internet country code top-level domain: .sy

== Geography of Syria ==
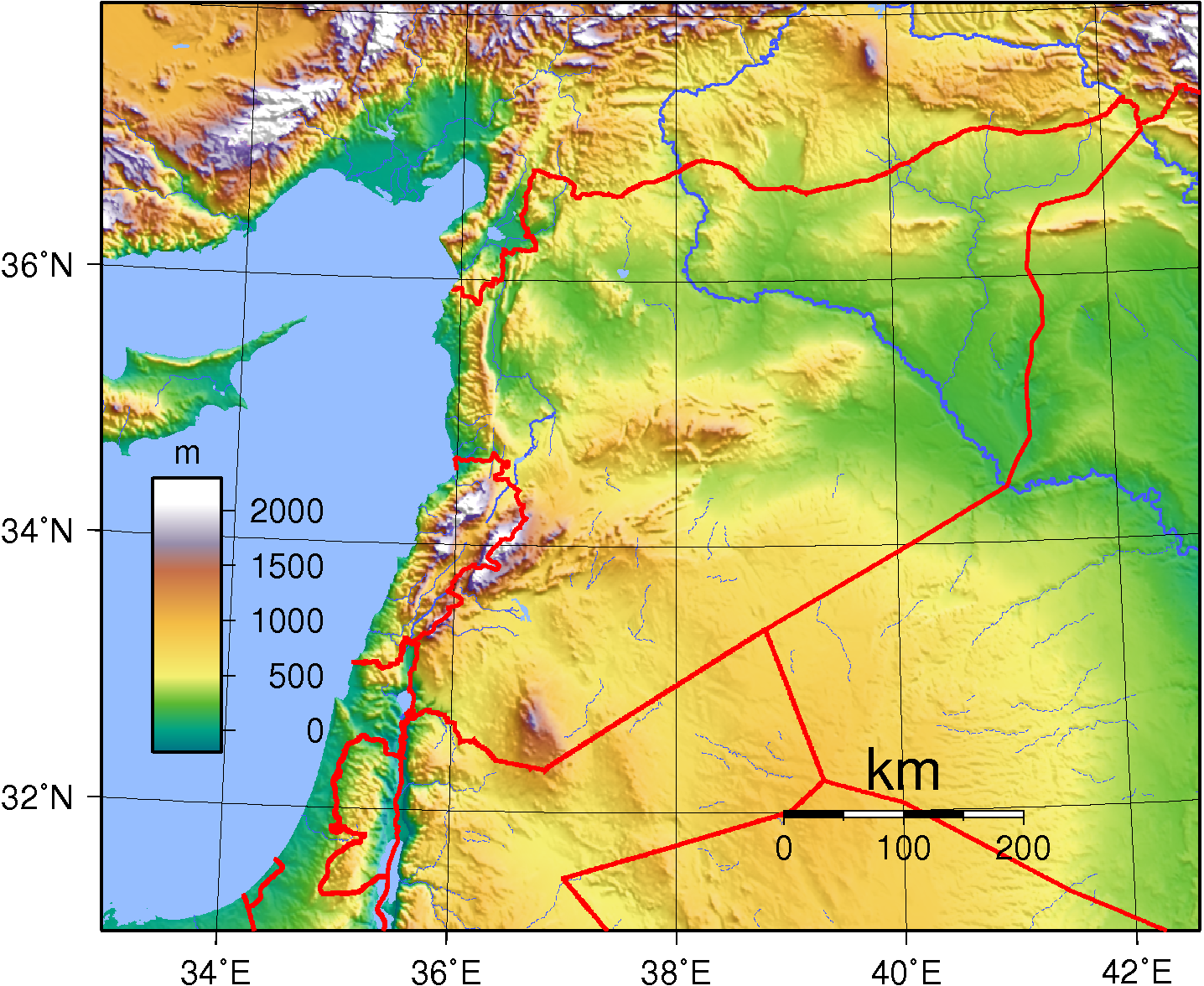
An enlargeable topographic map of Syria

- Syria is: a country
- Location:
  - Northern Hemisphere and Eastern Hemisphere
  - Eurasia
    - Asia
      - Western Asia
        - Southwest Asia
  - Middle East
    - Levant
  - Time in Syria
    - Time zone: UTC+02, summer UTC+03
  - Extreme points of Syria
    - High: Jabal el-Sheikh 2,814 m (9,232 ft)
    - Low: Mediterranean Sea 0 m
  - Land boundaries: 2,253 km

Turkey 822 km
Iraq 605 km
Jordan 375 km
Lebanon 375 km
Israel 76 km

- Coastline: Mediterranean Sea 193 km

- Population of Syria: 24,672,760 - 57th most populous country
- Area of Syria: 185180 km^{2}
- Atlas of Syria

=== Environment of Syria ===
- Climate of Syria
  - Climate change in Syria
- Environmental issues in Syria
- Geology of Syria
- Wildlife of Syria
  - Fauna of Syria
    - Birds of Syria
    - Mammals of Syria

==== Natural geographic features of Syria ====
- Islands of Syria
- Lakes of Syria
- Mountains of Syria
  - Volcanoes in Syria
- Rivers in Syria
- World Heritage Sites in Syria
- List of ecoregions in Syria

Administrative divisions of Syria

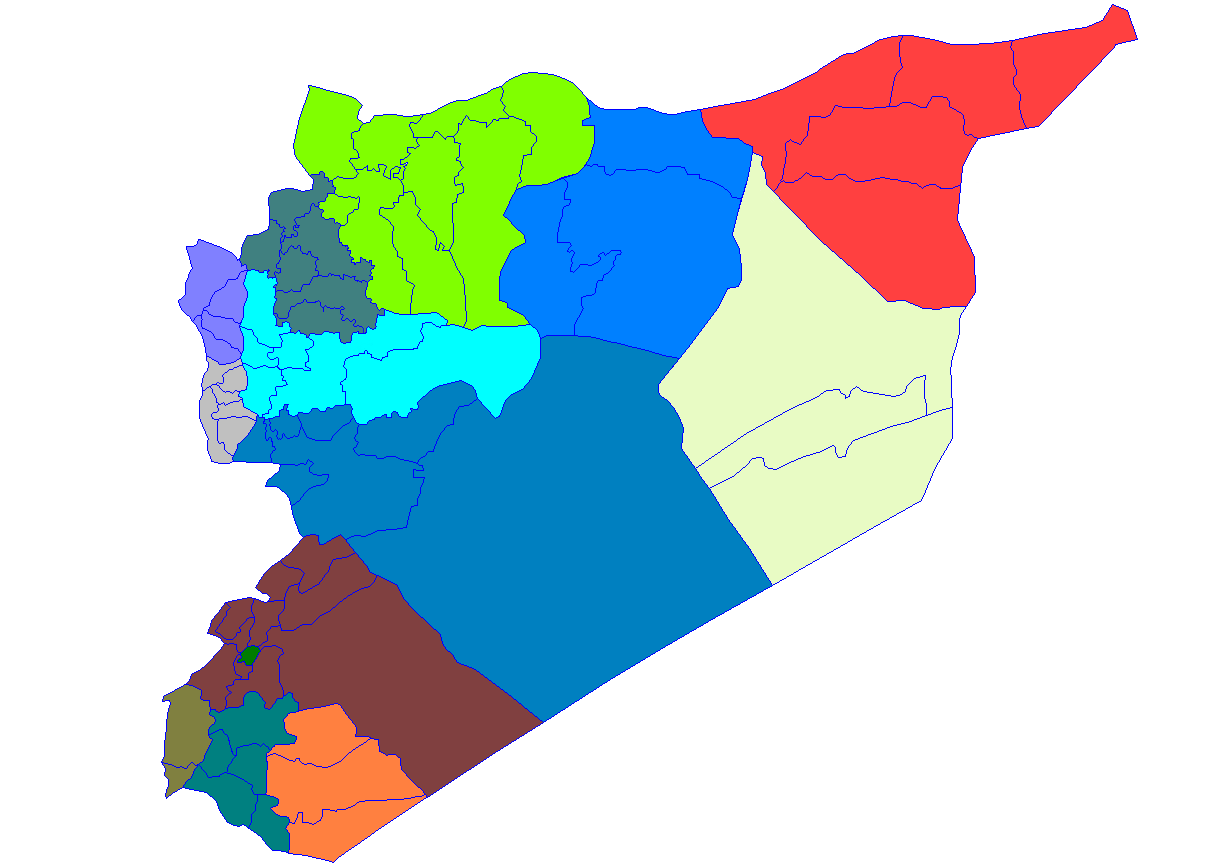

===== Governorates and Districts of Syria =====
- Al-Hasakah Governorate
  - Al-Hasakah District
  - Al-Malikiyah District
  - Al-Shaddadah District
  - Qamishli District
  - Ras al-Ayn District
- Aleppo Governorate
  - Afrin District
  - Al-Bab District
  - As-Safira District
  - Atarib District
  - Ayn al-Arab District
  - Azaz District
  - Dayr Hafir District
  - Jarabulus District
  - Manbij District
  - Mount Simeon District
- Damascus
- Daraa Governorate
  - As-Sanamayn District
  - Daraa District
  - Izraa District
- Deir ez-Zor Governorate
  - Abu Kamal District
  - Deir ez-Zor District
  - Mayadin District
- Hama Governorate
  - Al-Suqaylabiyah District
  - Hama District
  - Masyaf District
  - Mharda District
  - Salamiyah District
- Homs Governorate
  - Al-Mukharram District
  - Al-Qusayr District
  - Al-Rastan District
  - Homs District
  - Tadmur District
  - Taldou District
  - Talkalakh District
- Idlib Governorate
  - Ariha District
  - Harem District
  - Idlib District
  - Jisr al-Shughur District
  - Ma'arrat Nu'man District
- Latakia Governorate
  - Al-Haffah District
  - Jableh District
  - Latakia District
  - Qardaha District
- Quneitra Governorate
  - Fiq District
  - Quneitra District
- Raqqa Governorate
  - Raqqa District
  - Tabqa District
  - Tell Abyad District
- Rif Dimashq Governorate
  - Al-Nabek District
  - Al-Qutayfah District
  - Al-Tall District
  - Al-Zabadani District
  - Darayya District
  - Douma District
  - Markaz Rif Dimashq District
  - Qatana District
  - Qudsaya District
  - Yabroud District
- Sweida Governorate
  - Salkhad District
  - Shahba District
  - Suwayda District
- Tartus Governorate
  - Al-Shaykh Badr District
  - Baniyas District
  - Duraykish District
  - Safita District
  - Tartus District
- List of cities in Syria
- List of towns and villages in Syria

=== Demography of Syria ===
Demographics of Syria

== Government and politics of Syria ==
- Form of government: Provisional government
- Capital of Syria: Damascus
- Elections in Syria
- Political parties in Syria

=== Branches of the government of Syria ===
Government of Syria

==== Executive branch of the government of Syria ====
- Head of state and government: President of Syria, Ahmed al-Sharaa
  - List of presidents of Syria
  - List of vice presidents of Syria
  - List of prime ministers of Syria
- Cabinet of Syria
  - Government ministries of Syria

==== Legislative branch of the government of Syria ====
- People's Assembly of Syria (Unicameral)
  - List of speakers of the Parliament of Syria

==== Judicial branch of the government of Syria ====
Judiciary of Syria

- Supreme Judicial Council of Syria
  - Court of Cassation
  - Civil and criminal courts
  - Military courts
  - Security courts
- Supreme Constitutional Court of Syria

=== Foreign relations of Syria ===
- Arab League monitors in Syria
- Diplomatic missions in Syria
  - List of ambassadors of Canada to Syria
  - List of ambassadors of the United Kingdom to Syria
  - United Nations Supervision Mission in Syria
  - United States Ambassador to Syria
- Diplomatic missions of Syria
  - Permanent Representative of Syria to the United Nations

==== International organization membership ====
International organization membership of Syria The Syrian Arab Republic is a member of:

- Arab Bank for Economic Development in Africa (ABEDA)
- Arab Federation for Engineering Industries (General Organization for Engineering Industries)
- Arab Fund for Economic and Social Development (AFESD)
- Arab Monetary Fund (AMF)
- Council of Arab Economic Unity (CAEU)
- Food and Agriculture Organization (FAO)
- Group of 24 (G24)
- Group of 77 (G77)
- Interkosmos Spaceflight Program
- International Atomic Energy Agency (IAEA)
- International Bank for Reconstruction and Development (IBRD)
- International Chamber of Commerce (ICC)
- International Civil Aviation Organization (ICAO)
- International Criminal Court (ICCt) (signatory)
- International Criminal Police Organization (Interpol)
- International Development Association (IDA)
- International Federation of Red Cross and Red Crescent Societies (IFRCS)
- International Finance Corporation (IFC)
- International Fund for Agricultural Development (IFAD)
- International Hydrographic Organization (IHO)
- International Labour Organization (ILO)
- International Maritime Organization (IMO)
- International Monetary Fund (IMF)
- International Olympic Committee (IOC)
- International Organization for Standardization (ISO)
- International Red Cross and Red Crescent Movement (ICRM)
- International Telecommunication Union (ITU)
- International Telecommunications Satellite Organization (ITSO)
- Inter-Parliamentary Union (IPU)
- Islamic Development Bank (IDB)
- League of Arab States (LAS)
- Multilateral Investment Guarantee Agency (MIGA)
- Nonaligned Movement (NAM)
- Organization of Arab Petroleum Exporting Countries (OAPEC)
- Organisation of Islamic Cooperation (OIC)
- Organisation for the Prohibition of Chemical Weapons (OPCW)
- United Nations (UN)
- United Nations Conference on Trade and Development (UNCTAD)
- United Nations Educational, Scientific, and Cultural Organization (UNESCO)
- United Nations Industrial Development Organization (UNIDO)
- United Nations Relief and Works Agency for Palestine Refugees in the Near East (UNRWA)
- Universal Postal Union (UPU)
- World Customs Organization (WCO)
- World Federation of Trade Unions (WFTU)
- World Health Organization (WHO)
- World Intellectual Property Organization (WIPO)
- World Meteorological Organization (WMO)
- World Tourism Organization (UNWTO)

=== Law and order in Syria ===
- Constitution of Syria
- Crime in Syria
  - Human trafficking in Syria
  - Terrorism in Syria
- Human rights in Syria
  - Freedom of religion in Syria
  - Human rights violations during the Syrian civil war
  - LGBT rights in Syria
  - Law enforcement in Syria
- Visa requirements for Syrian citizens

=== Military of Syria ===
Military of Syria

- Command
  - Commander-in-chief:
    - Ministry of Defence of Syria
- Syrian Armed Forces
  - Syrian Army
  - Syrian Navy
  - Syrian Air Force
    - List of Syrian Air Force bases
    - List of Syrian Air Force squadrons
  - Syrian Republican Guard
- Military history of Syria
- Military ranks of Syria

== History of Syria ==
=== History of Syria, by period ===
- Syria during the Stone Age
  - Levantine corridor – relatively narrow land route of migrations between the Mediterranean Sea to the northwest and deserts to the southeast that connects Africa into Eurasia. It is believed that early hominids spread from Africa to Asia and Europe via the Horn of Africa and the Levantine corridor (named after the Levant, which includes Syria).
  - Cradle of civilization – term referring to locations identified as the sites of the emergence of civilization. In Western European and Middle Eastern cultures, it has frequently been applied to the Ancient Near Eastern Chalcolithic (Ubaid period, Naqada culture), especially in the Fertile Crescent (Levant and Mesopotamia).
    - Mesopotamia – area of the Tigris–Euphrates river system, corresponding to modern-day Iraq, the northeastern section of Syria and to a lesser extent southeastern Turkey and smaller parts of southwestern Iran. Widely considered to be the cradle of civilization in the West.
  - Natufian culture – Epipaleolithic culture that existed from 13,000 to 9,800 years ago in the Levant. It was unusual in that it was sedentary, or semi-sedentary, before the introduction of agriculture.
    - Tell Abu Hureyra – archaeological site located in the Euphrates valley in modern Syria. The remains of the villages within the tell come from over 4,000 years of habitation, spanning the Epipaleolithic and Neolithic periods. The inhabitants of Abu Hureyra started out as hunter-gatherers but gradually transitioned to farming, making them the earliest known farmers in the world.
  - Tell Aswad – large prehistoric, Neolithic Tell, about 5 hectares (540,000 sq ft) in size, located around 48 kilometres (30 mi) from Damascus in Syria.
  - Tell Ramad – prehistoric, Neolithic tell at the foot of Mount Hermon, about 20 kilometres (12 mi) southwest of Damascus in Syria. The tell was the site of a small village of 2 hectares (220,000 sq ft), which was first settled in the late eighth millennium BC.
  - Halaf culture – prehistoric period that existed between 6,100 - 5,100 BC primarily in the Khabur River, and is considered a continuous development of the Late Neolithic
    - Tell Halaf – prehistoric, Neolithic tell in Al-Hasakah, a few kilometers from Ras al-Ayn near the Syria-Turkey border. Considered the type-site of Halaf culture, with the name meaning "made of former city"
- Syria during the Bronze Age
  - Canaanites – Semitic-speaking civilization of the Levant, with significant religious importance
  - Amorites – Northwest Semitic-speaking Bronze Age peoples from the Levant, establishing several city states such as Andariq, Yamhad, and Andarig
  - Eblaites (Ebla city-state) – One of the earliest kingdoms in Syria, its remains now constitute a tell southwest of the city of Aleppo
  - Ugarites – Ancient port city in northern Syria, ruling an area roughly equating to the modern Latakia governorate
  - Akkadian Empire – First ever empire in the world
  - Arameans – Northwest Semitic semi-nomadic and pastoralist people who originated in what is now modern Syria (Biblical Aram) during the Late Bronze Age and the Iron Age.
  - Bronze Age collapse – sudden and culturally disruptive transition in the Aegean Region, Southwestern Asia and the Eastern Mediterranean from the Late Bronze Age to the Early Iron Age, during which the palace economy characterising the Late Bronze Age was replaced by the isolated village cultures of the Greek Dark Ages. Prior to and during the Bronze Age Collapse, Syria became a battle ground between the empires of the Hittites, Assyrians, Mitanni and Egyptians, and the coastal regions came under attack from the Sea Peoples. From the 13th Century BCE the Arameans came to prominence in Syria, and the region outside of the Phoenician coastal areas eventually became Aramaic speaking.
- Syro-Hittite states – Various Luwian and ancient Aramean regional polities, lasting from the collapse of the Hittite New Kingdom until their conquest by the Assyrian empire
- Phoenicia – City states along the Levantine region, with the core of its culture located in Arwad
- Achaemenid Empire – also known as the Persian Empire, primarily based in what is now modern day Iran
- Seleucid Empire – Greek state in West Asia during the Hellenistic period
  - Roman–Syrian War – also known as the Antiochene War, fought between the Roman Republic and the Seleucid Empire
- Syria (Roman province) – Early Roman province annexed by the Roman Republic, existed until its division into Coele Syria and Phoenice
  - Syria Palaestina – renamed Roman province formerly known as Judaea in what is now the region of Palestine
  - List of Roman governors of Syria
- Palmyrene Empire
  - Palmyra – ancient city in central Syria and prosperous regional center
- Syria in the Middle Ages
  - Byzantine Syria – Coele Syria (formerly part of the Roman province of Syria)
  - Muslim conquest of the Levant –
    - Rashidun Caliphate – First Islamic caliphate, incorporated Syria after the death of Muhammad
    - Umayyad Caliphate – Second Islamic caliphate, led by the Umayyad dynasty
      - Bilad al-Sham – Islamic Syria, province of the four successive caliphates
    - Great Seljuq Empire – Turco-Persian, Sunni Muslim empire led by the Qïnïq branch of Oghuz Turks
    - Ayyubid dynasty
    - Mongol invasions of Syria – starting in the 1240s, the Mongols made repeated invasions of Syria or attempts thereof. Most failed, but they did have some success in 1260 and 1300, capturing Aleppo and Damascus and destroying the Ayyubid dynasty.
    - County of Edessa – 12th century crusader state and centre of intellectual life within the Syriac Orthodox Church
    - Principality of Antioch – 12th century crusader state, mostly of Armenian and Greek Orthodox population
    - Ilkhanate – Mongol khanate with rule established over Syria in 1255
    - Mamluk Sultanate – State that ruled over Syria after the Mongols, before its invasion by the Ottoman Empire
- Early modern period
  - Ottoman Empire
    - Ottoman Syria
      - Timeline of Ottoman Syria history
- Modern history of Syria
  - Kingdom of Syria (8 March–24 July 1920)
  - State of Syria (1924–1930)
  - First Syrian Republic (1930–1950)
  - Second Syrian Republic (1950–1963)
  - Ba'athist Syria
    - 1963 Syrian coup d'état
    - 1966 Syrian coup d'état
    - 1970 Syrian Corrective Revolution
    - Islamic uprising in Syria
      - Hama massacre
    - 1999 Latakia protests
    - Damascus Spring
    - Ain es Saheb airstrike
    - Syria Accountability Act
    - 2004 Al-Qamishli riots
    - Damascus Declaration
    - Operation Orchard
    - 2008 Abu Kamal raid
    - Syrian civil war (15 March 2011 to 8 December 2024)
      - Casualties of the Syrian civil war
      - Cities and towns during the Syrian civil war
      - Foreign involvement in the Syrian civil war
      - Human rights violations during the Syrian civil war
      - International demonstrations and protests relating to the Syrian civil war
      - International reactions to the Syrian civil war
      - List of articles related to the Syrian civil war
      - List of bombings during the Syrian civil war
      - List of bombings during the Syrian civil war
      - List of heritage sites damaged during Syrian civil war
      - List of journalists killed during the Syrian civil war
      - Refugees of the Syrian civil war
      - Russia's role in the Syrian civil war
      - Sectarianism and minorities in the Syrian civil war
      - Syrian civil war spillover in Lebanon
      - Syrian reactions to the Syrian civil war
      - Timeline of the Syrian civil war
        - Timeline of the Syrian civil war (January–April 2011)
        - Timeline of the Syrian civil war (May–August 2011)
        - Timeline of the Syrian civil war (September–December 2011)
        - Timeline of the Syrian civil war (January–April 2012)
        - Timeline of the Syrian civil war (May–August 2012)
        - Timeline of the Syrian civil war (September–December 2012)
        - Timeline of the Syrian civil war (January–April 2013)
        - Timeline of the Syrian civil war (May–December 2013)
        - Timeline of the Syrian civil war (January–July 2014)
        - Timeline of the Syrian civil war (August–December 2014)
        - Timeline of the Syrian civil war (January–July 2015)
        - Timeline of the Syrian civil war (August–December 2015)
        - Timeline of the Syrian civil war (January–April 2016)
        - Timeline of the Syrian civil war (May–August 2016)
        - Timeline of the Syrian civil war (September–December 2016)
        - Timeline of the Syrian civil war (January–April 2017)
        - Timeline of the Syrian civil war (May–August 2017)
        - Timeline of the Syrian civil war (September–December 2017)
        - Timeline of the Syrian civil war (January–April 2018)
        - Timeline of the Syrian civil war (May–August 2018)
        - Timeline of the Syrian civil war (September–December 2018)
        - Timeline of the Syrian civil war (January–April 2019)
        - Timeline of the Syrian civil war (May–August 2019)
        - Timeline of the Syrian civil war (September–December 2019)
        - Timeline of the Syrian civil war (2020)
        - Timeline of the Syrian civil war (2021)
        - Timeline of the Syrian civil war (2022)
        - Timeline of the Syrian civil war (2023)
        - Timeline of the Syrian civil war (January–October 2024)
        - Timeline of the Syrian civil war (November 2024–present)
    - Fall of the Assad regime
    - Formation of the Syrian transitional government
    - Western Syria clashes (Assad loyalist insurgency)

=== History of Syria, by region ===
- History of the Middle East
  - History of the Levant
    - History of Syria
      - History of Aleppo
        - Ancient City of Aleppo
        - List of rulers of Aleppo
        - Timeline of Aleppo history
      - History of Antioch
        - Battles of Antioch
        - Siege of Antioch
        - Siege of Antioch (1268)
      - History of Damascus
        - List of rulers of Damascus
        - Timeline of Damascus history
      - History of Hama
      - History of Homs
        - First Battle of Homs
        - Second Battle of Homs
        - Siege of Homs

=== History of Syria, by subject ===
- History of religion in Syria
  - History of Eastern Christianity
    - History of Syriac Christianity
  - Islamization of Syria
- Military history of Syria
  - 1972 Israeli air raid in Syria and Lebanon
  - List of massacres in Syria
  - List of wars involving Syria
  - List of Syrian flying aces
  - Terrorism in Syria
- Mongol invasions of Syria

== Culture of Syria ==
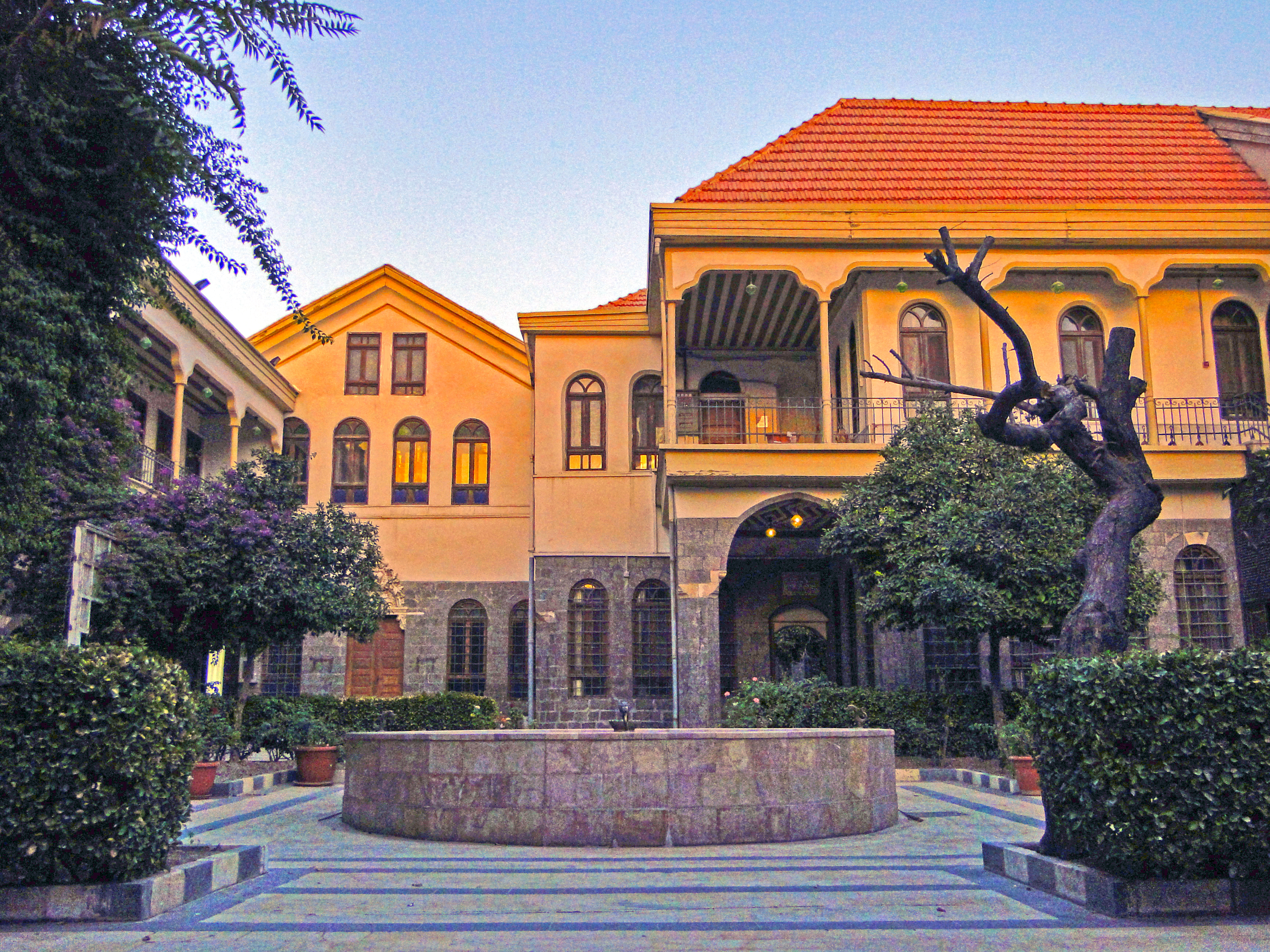
Maktab Anbar in the Ancient City of Damascus

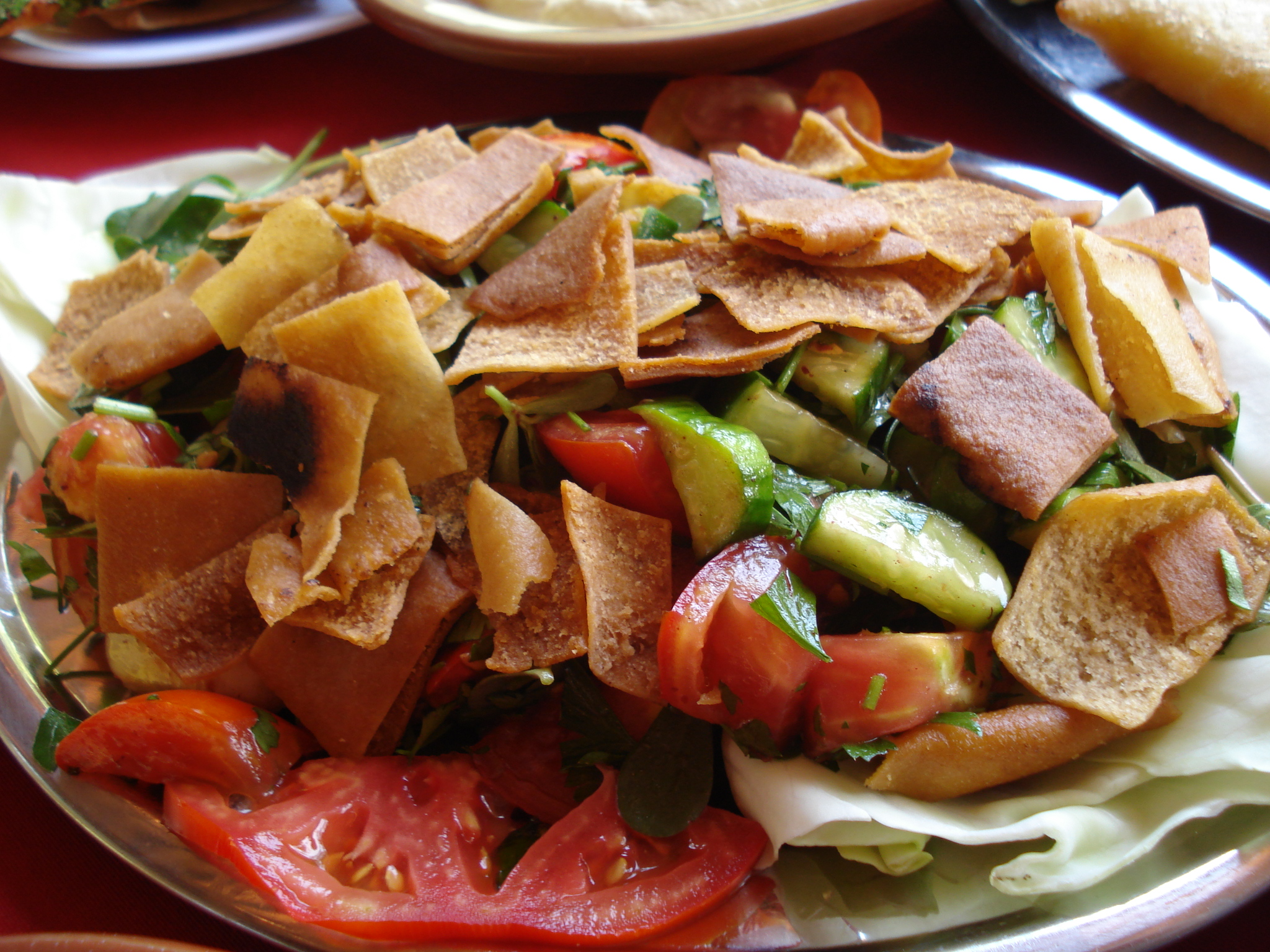
Fattoush, an example of Syrian cuisine

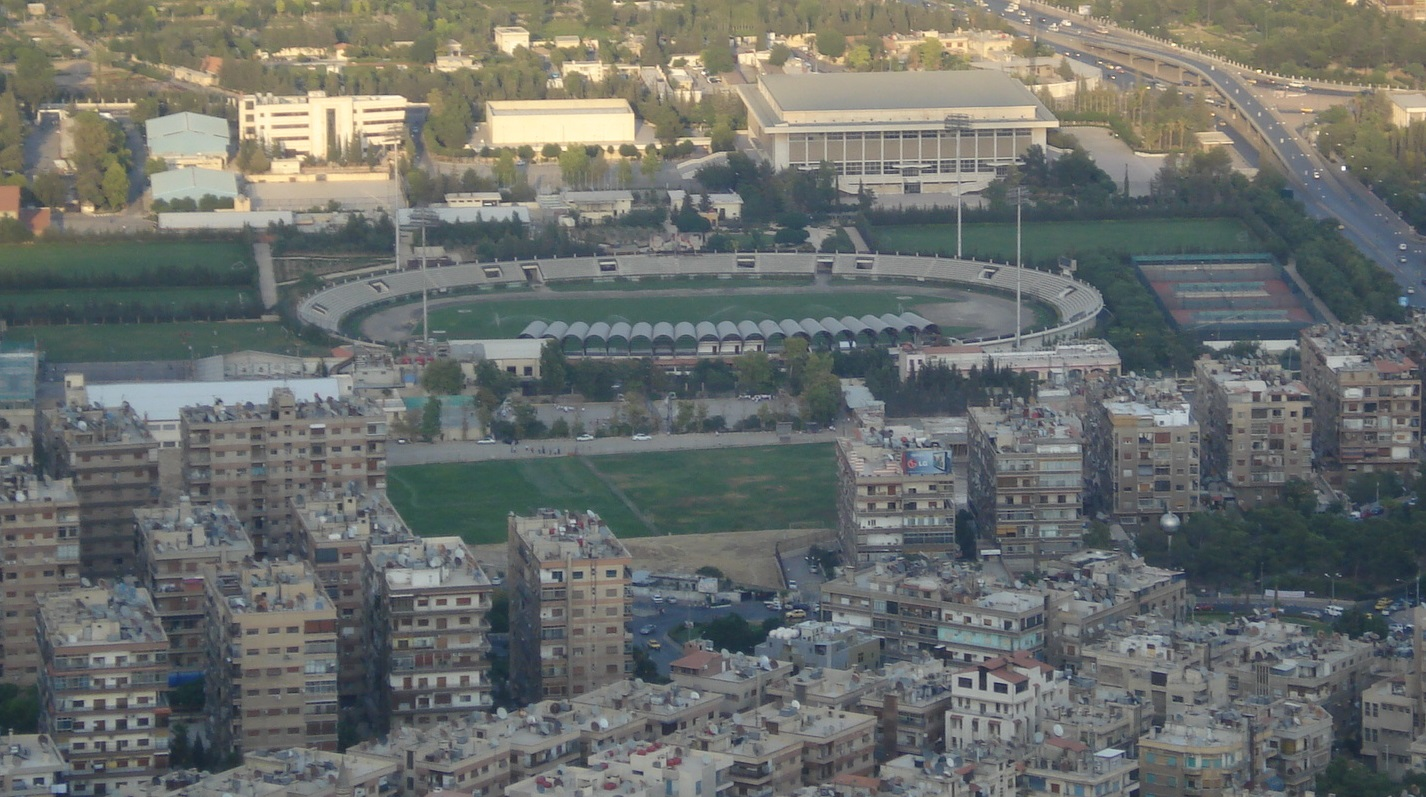
Al-Fayhaa Sports Complex

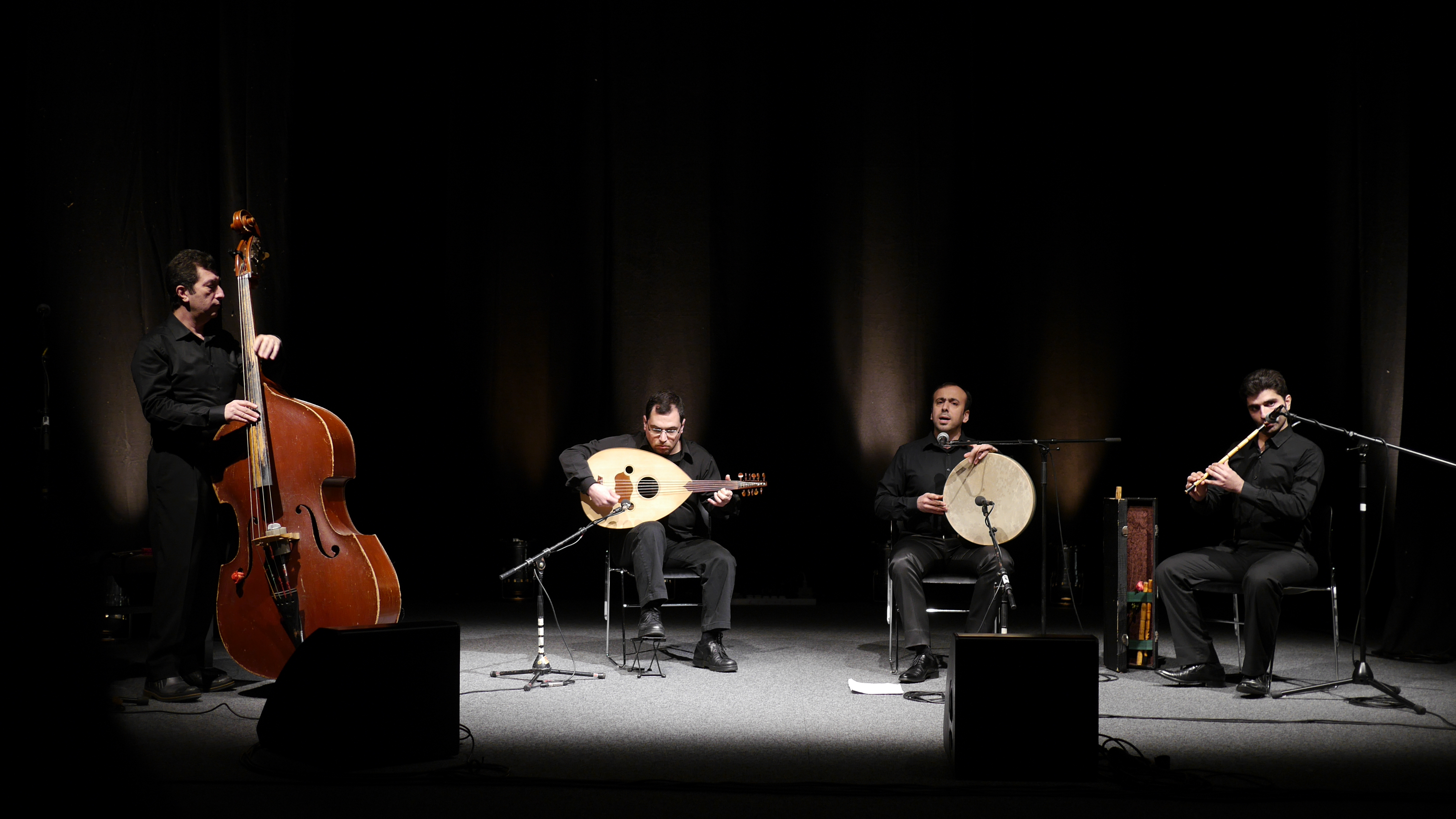
A group of Syrian musicians from Aleppo

- Architecture of Syria
  - List of castles in Syria
  - List of cathedrals in Syria
- Cuisine of Syria
  - Beer in Syria
- Languages of Syria
- Media of Syria
- Museums in Syria
- National symbols of Syria
  - Coat of arms of Syria
  - Flag of Syria
  - National anthem of Syria
- Prostitution in Syria
- Public holidays in Syria
- Smoking in Syria
- Scouting and Guiding in Syria
  - Scouts of Syria
- World Heritage Sites in Syria

=== Art in Syria ===
- List of Syrian artists
- Cinema of Syria
  - List of Syrian films
- Literature of Syria
- Music of Syria
- Television in Syria

=== People of Syria ===
- Armenians in Syria
- Assyrians in Syria
- Iraqis in Syria
- List of Syrian people
  - List of Druze
  - List of people from Damascus
  - List of people from Homs
  - List of people from Latakia
  - List of Syrian Armenians
  - List of Syrian artists
  - List of Syrian defectors

=== Religion in Syria ===
Religion in Syria

- List of monasteries in Syria
- Christianity in Syria
  - Eastern Orthodoxy in Syria
  - Roman Catholicism in Syria
  - List of cathedrals in Syria
  - Syriac Christianity
- Hinduism in Syria
- Islam in Syria
  - List of mosques in Aleppo
  - List of mosques in Damascus
  - List of mosques in Syria
- Judaism in Syria

=== Sports in Syria ===
Sports in Syria

- Football in Syria
  - List of football clubs in Syria
  - List of football stadiums in Syria
  - Syria national football team results
    - Syria national football team results 2009
    - Syria national football team results 2010
  - Syrian Premier League top scorers
- Syria at the Olympics
  - List of flag bearers for Syria at the Olympics
- Rugby union in Syria

== Economy and infrastructure of Syria ==
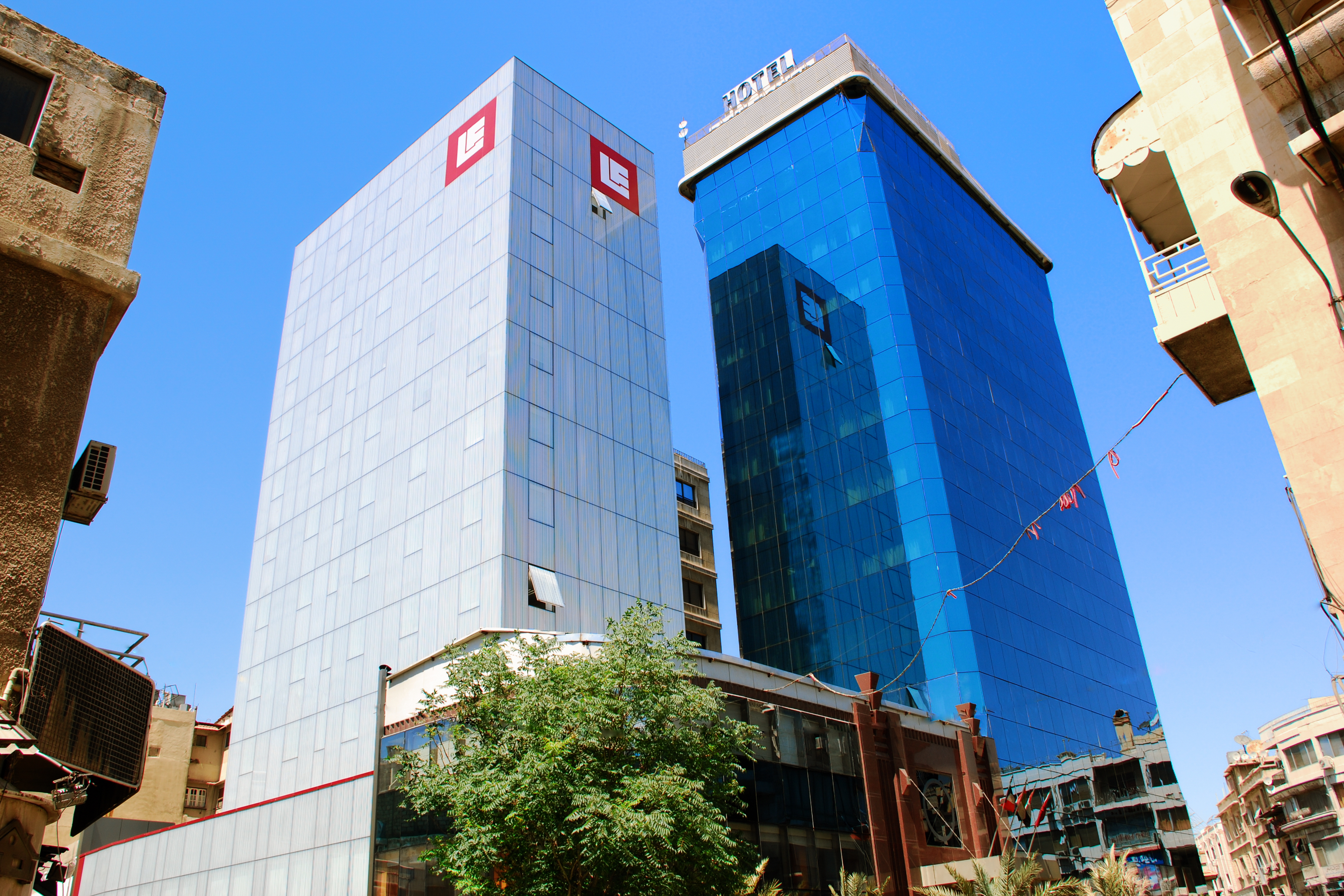
Bank Al-Sharq and the Blue Tower Hotel in Damascus

- Agriculture in Syria
  - Forestry in Syria
- Banking in Syria
  - Central Bank of Syria
  - Commercial Bank of Syria
- Communications in Syria
  - Telecommunications in Syria
- List of Radio Towers in Syria
    - Telephone numbers in Syria
    - Television in Syria
    - Internet in Syria
  - Media in Syria
    - List of radio stations in Syria
    - Newspapers in Syria
- Companies of Syria
- Currency of Syria: Pound
  - ISO 4217: SYP
- Damascus Securities Exchange
- Economic rank, by nominal GDP (2007): 75th (seventy-fifth)
- Energy in Syria
  - Electricity in Syria
  - Power stations in Syria
  - Oil industry in Syria
- Mining in Syria
- Tourism in Syria
- Transport in Syria
  - Air transport in Syria
    - Airlines of Syria
    - Airports in Syria
  - Rail transport in Syria
  - Vehicle registration plates of Syria
- Waste management in Syria
  - Water supply and sanitation in Syria
- Water in Syria
  - Water supply and sanitation in Syria
  - Water resources management in Syria

== Education in Syria ==
- Academic grading in Syria
- List of schools in Syria
- List of universities in Syria
- List of medical schools in Syria

== Health in Syria ==
- List of medical schools in Syria
- Smoking in Syria

== See also ==
Syria

- List of international rankings
- Member state of the United Nations
- Outline of Asia
- Outline of geography
- Greeks in Syria
- Kurds in Syria
- Cabinet of Syria (2001–2003)
- Cabinet of Syria (2003–2011)
- Embassy of Syria in Moscow
- Embassy of Syria, Berlin
- Embassy of Syria, London
- Embassy of Syria, Washington, D.C.
- 2011 in Syria
- 2013 Israeli Airstrike in Syria
- Ambassador of Syria to the United States
- Armenian Evangelical Christian Endeavor Union of Syria and Lebanon
- Bank of Syria and Overseas
- Canadians of Syrian ancestry
- Center for Documentation of Violations in Syria
- Commercial Bank of Syria
- Domnina of Syria
- Friends of Syria Group
- General Union of Syrian Women
- Hama uprising in Syria
- History of Syria: including Lebanon and Palestine
- History of the Jews in Syria
- International rankings of Syria
- Internet censorship in Syria
- Islamic uprising in Syria
- Jobert of Syria
- King of Syria
- Kurdistan Democratic Party of Syria
- LGBT rights in Syria
- List of Lebanese in Syrian jails
- List of Seljuk rulers in Syria (1076–1117)
- List of Syriac Catholic Patriarchs of Antioch
- List of Syriac Orthodox Patriarchs of Antioch
- List of Syriac Patriarchs of Antioch from 512 to 1783
- List of Syriac writers
- Local Coordination Committees of Syria
- Macedonius of Syria
- Malchus of Syria
- Military ranks of Syria
- Movement for Justice and Development in Syria
- Muslim Brotherhood of Syria
- Names of Syriac Christians
- Nicanor of Syria
- Postage stamps and postal history of Syria
- Stratonice of Syria
- Thalassius and Limneus
- The Day After: Supporting a Democratic Transition in Syria
