= Scouting and Guiding in Syria =

The Scout and Guide movement in Syria is served by

- Scouts of Syria, member of both the World Organization of the Scout Movement and the World Association of Girl Guides and Girl Scouts
- Scouts Assyriens, serving Christians from Mesopotamia
- Homenetmen, serving Armenian youth

Syrian Scouts and Guides in Turkish exile are served by the Syrian Private Scouts
