= List of articles related to the Syrian civil war =

Articles related to the Syrian civil war cover battles and chronology, humanitarian and political topics, armed groups, and international involvement. Topics include casualties and refugees, human rights violations, pro-government and opposition forces, foreign fighters and support, international reactions and peace initiatives, and Syria's relations with other countries.

== Main ==
- Syrian Civil War
- Battle of Damascus (2012)
- Battle of Aleppo (2012)
- Timeline of the Syrian Civil War
- Cities and towns during the Syrian Civil War
- Syrian reactions to the Syrian Civil War
- Human rights violations during the Syrian Civil War
- Local Coordination Committees of Syria
- Syrian Kurdistan campaign (2012–present)
- Shabiha
- Sectarianism and minorities in the Syrian Civil War
- Refugees of the Syrian Civil War
- Casualties of the Syrian Civil War
- Politics of Syria
- List of freedom indices
- List of journalists killed during the Syrian Civil War
- Salim Idris

== Armed groups ==
- List of armed groups in the Syrian Civil War

=== Pro-government forces ===
- Syrian Armed Forces
- Shabiha
  - Syrian Resistance
- Jaysh al-Sha'bi
- National Defense Force (Syria)
- Popular Committees (Syria)
- Liwa Abu al-Fadhal al-Abbas
- Islamic Revolutionary Guard Corps
- Basij
- Hezbollah
- Popular Front for the Liberation of Palestine – General Command
- Houthis
- Promised Day Brigades
- Asa'ib Ahl al-Haq
- Badr Organization
- Kata'ib Hezbollah
- Syrian Social Nationalist Party
- Popular Nasserist Organization

=== Opposition forces ===
- Islamic Front (Syria)
  - Syrian Islamic Liberation Front
    - Suqour al-Sham Brigade
    - Jaysh al-Islam
    - Al-Tawhid Brigade
    - Ahfad al-Rasul Brigade
    - Farouq Brigades
  - Syrian Islamic Front
    - Ahrar ash-Sham
- Free Syrian Army
  - Syrian Martyrs' Brigade
  - Syrian Turkmen Brigades
  - Liwaa al-Umma
- al-Qaeda
  - al-Nusra Front
  - Islamic State of Iraq and Syria
- Tehrik-i-Taliban Pakistan
- Jaish al-Muhajireen wal-Ansar
- Fatah al-Islam
- Ghuraba al-Sham (Syria)
- Ghuraba al-Sham (jihadist group)
- Syria Martyrs' Brigade
- Abdullah Azzam Shaheed Brigade
- Jund al-Sham
- Muslim Brotherhood of Syria
- Future Movement
- Free Iraqi Army

== Foreign involvement ==
- Kofi Annan peace plan for Syria
- International reactions to the Syrian Civil War
- Foreign rebel fighters in the Syrian Civil War
- Russia's role in the Syrian Civil War
- Foreign involvement in the Syrian Civil War
- Iranian support for Syria in the Syrian Civil War
- Iran–Syria relations
- Russia–Syria relations
- Syria–United States relations
- Saudi Arabia–Syria relations
- Syria–Turkey relations
- France–Syria relations
