= Ibrahim Zakaria (scout) =

International Commissioner of the Scouts of Syria

International Commissioner of the Scouts of Syria

Ibrahim Zakaria (Arabic: إبراهيم زكريا) served as International Commissioner of the Scouts of Syria.

In 1980, he was awarded the 140th Bronze Wolf, the only distinction of the World Organization of the Scout Movement, awarded by the World Scout Committee for exceptional services to world Scouting.
