= Scouting and Guiding in Iraq =

Scouting and Guiding Organizations in Iraq

The Scout and Guide movement in Iraq is served by

- Iraq Boy Scouts and Girl Guides Council
- Assyrian Scouting and Guiding

== History ==

The history of Scouting in Iraq started with the British Mandate of Mesopotamia in the early 1920s, when Scouting got started in several areas and was well entrenched. In the early 1930s, the Iraqi Scout movement was fairly strong, but by 1939 it dwindled in numbers. After the 1941 Iraqi coup d'état, all youth organizations were disbanded. But by 1943, the Germans had been expelled and there were three British Service Rover Crews, based in Baghdad, Basra, and Habbaniya.

RAF Habbaniya opened in 1937, on the Euphrates 40 miles (64 km) west of Baghdad as the permanent Royal Air Force headquarters for Iraq. As well as the military part of the station, there was a civil cantonment for civilians working on the station and their families. The population was very mixed, with a comparatively high proportion of Assyrians. In 1940 the schoolmaster wished to start a Scout organization and was assisted by the Royal Air Force servicemen stationed there. The Iraqi Scout Organization was run on British lines, consisting of seven troops each with a British and an Assyrian instructor, a Senior Scout troop, and an Assyrian Rover crew. Girls wanted to join, so the Rovers started a separate troop for them. Some British nursing sisters (the only British women on the station) with experience as Girl Guides, started working with the group, until there were four Girl Guide companies, again run on British Guiding lines, within the framework of the Iraqi Scouting Organization.

== International Scouting units in Iraq ==
In addition, there are American Boy Scouts, linked to the Direct Service branch of the Boy Scouts of America.
