= Al-Dimashqi =

The Arabic nisbah (attributive title) Al-Dimashqi (Arabic: الدمشقي) denotes an origin from Damascus, Syria.

Al-Dimashqi may refer to:

- Al-Dimashqi (geographer): a medieval Arab geographer.
- Abu al-Fadl Ja'far ibn 'Ali al-Dimashqi: 12th-century Muslim merchant.
- Al-Dhahabi: Shafi'i Muhaddith and historian of Islam.
- Ibn Abi Talib al-Dimashqi: 14th-century Syrian theologian
- Ibn al-Nafis: Arab physician who is mostly famous for being the first to describe the pulmonary circulation of the blood.
- Ibn Qayyim Al-Jawziyya: a prominent Sunni Islamic jurist.
- Ibn 'Asakir: a Sunni Islamic scholar and historian
- John of Damascus (Yuhanna al-Dimashqi) - Christian monk

== See also ==
- List of people from Damascus
