= List of people from Damascus =

The following is a list of notable people from Damascus, Syria.

== Ancient ==
- Ananias - one of the Seventy Disciples
- Apollodorus of Damascus - Syrian architect
- Ibn al-Nafis - polymath whose areas of work included medicine, surgery, physiology, anatomy, biology, Islamic studies, jurisprudence, and philosophy. He is mostly famous for being the first to describe the pulmonary circulation of the blood.
- Ibn al-Shatir was an astronomer, mathematician and engineer
- Ibn Qayyim al-Jawziyya - polymath
- Damascius - Byzantine philosopher
- Israel ben Moses Najara - poet, Kaballist and rabbi
- John of Damascus - Christian monk
- Nicolaus of Damascus - historian and philosopher
- Shams al-Din al-Ansari al-Dimashqi - Medieval Arab geographer
- Sophronius - Patriarch of Jerusalem

== Modern ==
- Ahmed al-Sharaa - President of Syria
- Bashar al-Assad - Former president of Syria and doctor
- Lutfi al-Haffar - Former Prime Minister of Syria
- Avraham Abaas - Israeli politician, member of the Knesset
- Michel Aflaq - political thinker and co-founder of the Baath Party
- Khalid al-Azm - former prime minister of Syria
- Salah al-Din al-Bitar - political thinker and co-founder of the Baath Party
- Shukri al-Quwatli - former Syrian president and co-founder of the United Arab Republic
- Ghada al-Samman - novelist
- Ikram Antaki - Mexican writer
- Ivonne Attas - Venezuelan telenovela soap opera actress and politician
- Husam Chadat - Syrian-German actor and director
- Hanin Elias - member of punk rock band Atari Teenage Riot
- Sam Hamad - Quebec politician
- Izzat Husrieh - journalist and founder of the Syrian labor union
- Mohamed Haytham Khayat - Syrian physician and lexicographer
- Khaled Malas - Syrian Architect
- Abu Khalil Qabbani - Syrian playwright, considered the founder of Syrian theater
- Nizar Qabbani - poet
- Fatima Saad - voice actress
- Eliyahu Sasson - Israeli politician and minister
- Rafik Schami - Syrian-German author
- Yasser Seirawan - chess player
- Zakaria Tamer - writer
- Soraya Tarzi - Queen of Afghanistan
- Samuel Vital - Kabalist
- Muna Wassef - actress and United Nations Goodwill ambassador
- Ziad Zukkari – painter, artist
- Constantin Zureiq - academic intellectual and Arab nationalist

== Families ==
- Al-Asali
- Al-Azm
- Al-Marwani family
- Al-Azma
- Al-Dimashki
- Al-Ghazzi
- Mardam-Bey
- Qabbani

== See also ==
- List of rulers of Damascus
- Al-Dimashqi
