= Assyrian Scouting and Guiding =

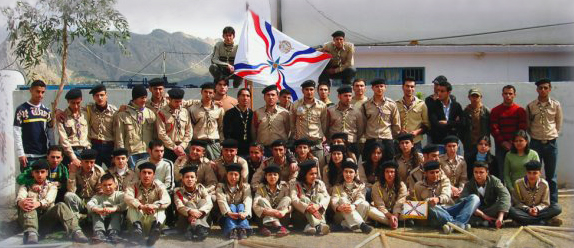
Assyrian Scouts in Iraq

Assyrian Scouting and Guiding is composed of multiple small Assyrian Scouting associations, open mainly to boys and girls of Assyrian descent in Iraq, Lebanon, Australia and Sweden, and previously in Syria.

== History ==
Assyrian Scouting and Guiding was founded around 1912 in the Assyrian areas of the Ottoman Empire, then later developed abroad among the refugees who had survived the genocide of 1914-1920 and among those that had fled.

The history of Scouting in Iraq started with the British Mandate of Mesopotamia in the early 1920s, when Scouting got started in several areas and was well entrenched. RAF Habbaniya opened in 1937, on the Euphrates 40 miles west of Baghdad as the permanent Royal Air Force headquarters for Iraq. As well as the military part of the station, there was a civil cantonment for civilians working on the station and their families. The population was very mixed, with a comparatively high proportion of Assyrians. In 1940 the schoolmaster wished to start a Scout organization and was assisted by the Royal Air Force servicemen stationed there. The Iraqi Scout Organization was run on British lines, consisting of seven troops each with a British and an Assyrian instructor, a Senior Scout troop, and an Assyrian Rover crew. Girls wanted to join, so the Rovers started a separate troop for them. Some British nursing sisters (the only British women on the station) with experience as Girl Guides, started working with the group, until there were four Girl Guide companies, again run on British Guiding lines, within the framework of the Iraqi Scouting Organization.

== Organizations ==
Today, several organizations exist, among them:

- Hammurabi Assyrian Scout Association, ܒܕܩܘܬܐ ܕܚܡܘܪܒܝ, named for Hammurabi, with more than 250 Scouts, and branches in Baghdad, Nineveh, Duhok, and Arbil governorates
- Universal Syriac Scout Association, جمعية الكشاف السرياني اللبناني - ܟܢܘܫܬܐ ܕܒܕܘܩܐ ܣܘܪܝܝܐ ܠܒܢܢܝܐ, a member of the Lebanese Scouting Federation, by extension a member of the World Organization of the Scout Movement
- Swedish Assyrian Scouting Association
- Scouts Assyriens, affiliated to the Scouts of Syria
- Assyrisch-Aramäische Pfadfinder Mitteleuropa
- Assyrian Eagle Scouts of Australia

== Ideals ==
The Scout Motto is ܡܬܘܼܡ ܥܬܝܼܕܵܐ, M-Thoom 'ateeda! IPA: "mθu:m ʕa:ti:da:", Always Ready in Assyrian Syriac.

== Emblems ==
The Hammurabi Assyrian Scout Association emblem incorporates elements of the Assyrian flag as well as the upper part of the stele of the Code of Hammurabi

The Swedish Assyrian Scouting Association emblem incorporates the Syriac flag and the national emblem of Svenska Scoutrådet

The Assyrian Eagle Scouts of Australia emblem incorporates elements of the Assyrian flag

== See also ==
- Assyrian Democratic Movement

== Links ==
- Universal Syriac Scout Association
- Assyrian Eagle Scouts of Australia
- Hammurabi Assyrian Scout Association
- Monhronuto Suryoyto (early Assyrian Boy Scouts in Syria)
