= Battle of Antioch =

Battles of Antioch may refer to:

- Battle of Antioch (145 BC) or the Battle of the Oenoparus, a battle between Ptolemaic Egypt and the Seleucid Empire
- Battle of Antioch (218), a battle between Macrinus and Elagabalus
- Siege of Antioch (253), a siege by the Sassanid Empire against the Roman Empire
- Battle of Antioch (613), a battle between the Byzantine and Sassanid Empires
- Battle of Antioch (1097), a siege by the Crusaders against the Muslim-held city, part of the First Crusade
- Battle of Antioch (1098), a battle between the Crusaders of Antioch and a Turkish coalition, part of the First Crusade
- Battle of Antioch (1268), a siege in which the Mamelukes under Baibars captured the city of Antioch

== See also ==
- Battle of the Lake of Antioch, a 1098 battle during the Siege of Antioch during the First Crusade
- Siege of Antioch (disambiguation)
