= Jacob ben Hayyim Zemah =

17th century Portuguese kabalist and physician

Jacob ben Hayyim Zemah (Hebrew: יעקב צמח) was a Portuguese kabalist and physician. He received a medical training in his native country as a Marrano, but fled about 1619 to Safed and devoted himself to the Talmud and the casuists ("poseḳim") until 1625; then he went to Damascus, where for eighteen years he studied kabbalah from the Zohar and the writings of Isaac Luria and Hayyim Vital. He finally settled at Jerusalem and opened a yeshivah for the study of the Zohar and other kabbalistic works, David Conforte being for some time one of his pupils.

== Author ==
Jacob Ẓemaḥ was one of the greatest kabbalists of his period and was a prolific author, his works including treatises of his own as well as compilations of the writings of Ḥayyim Vital. He produced twenty works, of which only two have been published. The first of these is the Ḳol ba-Ramah (Korez, 1785), a commentary on the Idra, which he began in 1643, and for which he utilized the commentary of Ḥayyim Vital. In the preface to this work he maintained that the coming of the Messiah depended on repentance ("teshuvah") and on the study of kabbalah from the Zohar and the writings of Isaac Luria, the delay in the advent of the Messiah being because schools for such study had not been established in every town.

His second published work is the Nagid u-Meẓawweh (Amsterdam, 1712), on the mystical meaning of the prayers, this being an abridgment of a compendium which Ẓemaḥ composed on the basis of a more comprehensive treatise.

Among his unpublished works, special mention may be made of the Ronnu le-Ya'aḳob, in which he calls himself "the proselyte" ("ger ẓedeḳ"). This treatise consists of notes recorded while studying under Samuel Vital and supplemented by his own additions. In his compilation of Ḥayyim Vital's writings, Ẓemaḥ pretended to have discovered many works of Vital which were unknown to the latter's son Samuel.

== Death ==
He died at Jerusalem in the second half of the 17th century.
