= International rankings of Syria =

National rankings in various categories

The following are international rankings of Syria.

== Demographics ==
Rankings
Name	Rank	Out of	Source	Notes	Year
Number of Syrian nationals	55	228	Syrian Central Bureau of Statistics	23,344,074 number of Syrian nationals	2015
Life expectancy	129	194	World Health Organization	68 overall life expectancy	2013
Birth rate	74	224	The world factbook	22.76 births per 1000 population/year	2014
Death rate	151	225	The world factbook	6.51 deaths per 1000 population/year	2014
divorce rate	26	world	United Nations	1.0 divorces per 1000 population/year	2006
Urbanization	100	195	United Nations	56% of the Syrians is urban	2005 - 2010
Infant mortality	73	188	The world Factbook	15.02 infant deaths per 1000 births	2005 - 2010
Maternal mortality	59	135	World Health Organization	110 per 100,000 per year	2001
Life expectancy	113	224	The world Factbook	The average Syrian citizen would reach an age of 74.69 years	2015

== Economy ==
- The Wall Street Journal and The Heritage Foundation: Index of Economic Freedom 2008, ranked 144 out of 157 countries.
- International Monetary Fund: GDP (nominal) per capita 2007, ranked 111 out of 182 countries.
- International Monetary Fund: GDP (nominal) 2007, ranked 63 out of 181 countries.
- World Economic Forum: Global Competitiveness Index 2008-2009, ranked 78 out of 134 countries.

== Environment ==
- Yale University: Environmental Sustainability Index 2021 ranked,50 out of 149

== Geography ==
- Total area ranked 88 out of 233 countries.

== Globalization ==
- A.T. Kearney/Foreign Policy Magazine: Globalization Index 2007, ranked 109 out of 122 countries.

== Military ==
- Center for Strategic and International Studies: active troops ranked 22 out of 166 countries
- Institute for Economics and Peace Global Peace Index ranked92 out of 144

== Politics ==
- Transparency International: Corruption Perceptions Index 2008, ranked 147 out of 180 countries.
- Reporters Without Borders: Worldwide press freedom index 2008, ranked 159 out of 173 countries.
- The Economist Democracy Index 2008, ranked 156 out of 167 countries
- Economist Intelligence Unit Shoe-Thrower's index ranked 4

== Society ==
- United Nations: Human Development Index 2010, ranked 111 out of 169 countries
- Gallup Global Wellbeing Index 2010, ranked 122 out of 155

== Technology ==
- World Economic Forum Networked Readiness Index 2007–2008, ranked 110 out of 127 countries
