= Hama uprising =

Hama uprising may refer to:

- 1925 Hama uprising, part of the Great Syrian Revolt
- 1964 Hama riot
- 1981 Hama massacre, during the Islamic uprising in Syria
- 1982 Hama massacre, during the Islamic uprising in Syria
- Siege of Hama (2011), during the 2011 Syrian uprising
