= List of people from Latakia =

The following is a list of notable people from Latakia and ancient Laodicea.

== Ancient ==
- Anatolius of Laodicea
- Apollinaris of Laodicea
- Eusebius of Laodicea
- Philonides of Laodicea
- Themison of Laodicea

== Modern ==
- Hafez al-Assad, former president of Syria
- Bashar al-Assad, former president of Syria
- Adunis, poet
- A. R. Frank Wazzan, professor of engineering; Dean Emeritus, of the UCLA Samueli School of Engineering, UCLA
- Hasan Alkhayer, poet and politician
- Yusuf Yasin, an advisor to King Abdulaziz
- Hanna Mina, novelist
- Izz ad-Din al-Qassam, sheikh and a rebel leader in Palestine
- Michel Kilo, writer and activist
- Aref Dalila, economist and activist
- Badawi al-Jabal, poet
- Mustafa Hamsho, professional boxer
- Zaki al-Arsuzi, politician and founder of Baath Party
- Maram al-Masri, poet
- Yusuf Yasin, politician and journalist
- Adnan Alkateb, editorial Manager of Hia Magazine.
- Khalida Said, writer
- Rasha Abbas, author and journalist
