= Samuel Vital =

Samuel ben Hayyim Vital (Hebrew: שמואל ויטאל; 1598 – 1677) was a Kabalist born in Damascus in the latter half of the sixteenth century. While still young he married a daughter of Isaiah Pinto, rabbi of Damascus. Poverty compelled him to emigrate to Egypt, where, through the influence of prominent men, he was placed in charge of the cabalistic society Tiḳḳune ha-Teshubah. After a brief residence there he went to Safed, where he instructed the physician Jacob Zemah in Kabala. In the middle of the 17th century he returned to Egypt, where he died.

Samuel Vital was the author of both cabalistic and rabbinical works. Among the former may be noted the Shemonah She'arim, an introduction to the Cabala, later embodied in the Eẓ Ḥayyim (Zolkiev, 1772; Korzec, 1785). Among his unpublished writings mention may be made of his Sefer Toẓe'ot Ḥayyim, a commentary on the Bible, and his Sefer Ta'alumot Ḥokmah, on the Cabala.

== Jewish Encyclopedia bibliography ==
- Moritz Steinschneider, Cat. Bodl. cols. 834–835, 2495;
- David Conforte, Ḳore ha-Dorot, pp. 40b, 42a, 49b;
- Azulai, Shem ha-Gedolim;
- Giovanni Bernardo De Rossi, Dizionario
- Kohn (Kahana), Eben Negef, Vienna, 1874;
- Fuenn, Keneset Yisrael;
- Benjacob, Oẓar ha-Sefarim;
- Julius Fürst, Bibl. Jud. iii. 479–482.
