= International demonstrations and protests relating to the Syrian civil war =

International demonstrations and protests relating to the Syrian Civil War have taken place outside Syria during the war.

== 2011 ==
=== March ===
- Canada: On 30, March, protesters in support of the Syrian government faced off against anti government protesters in downtown Montreal.

=== April ===
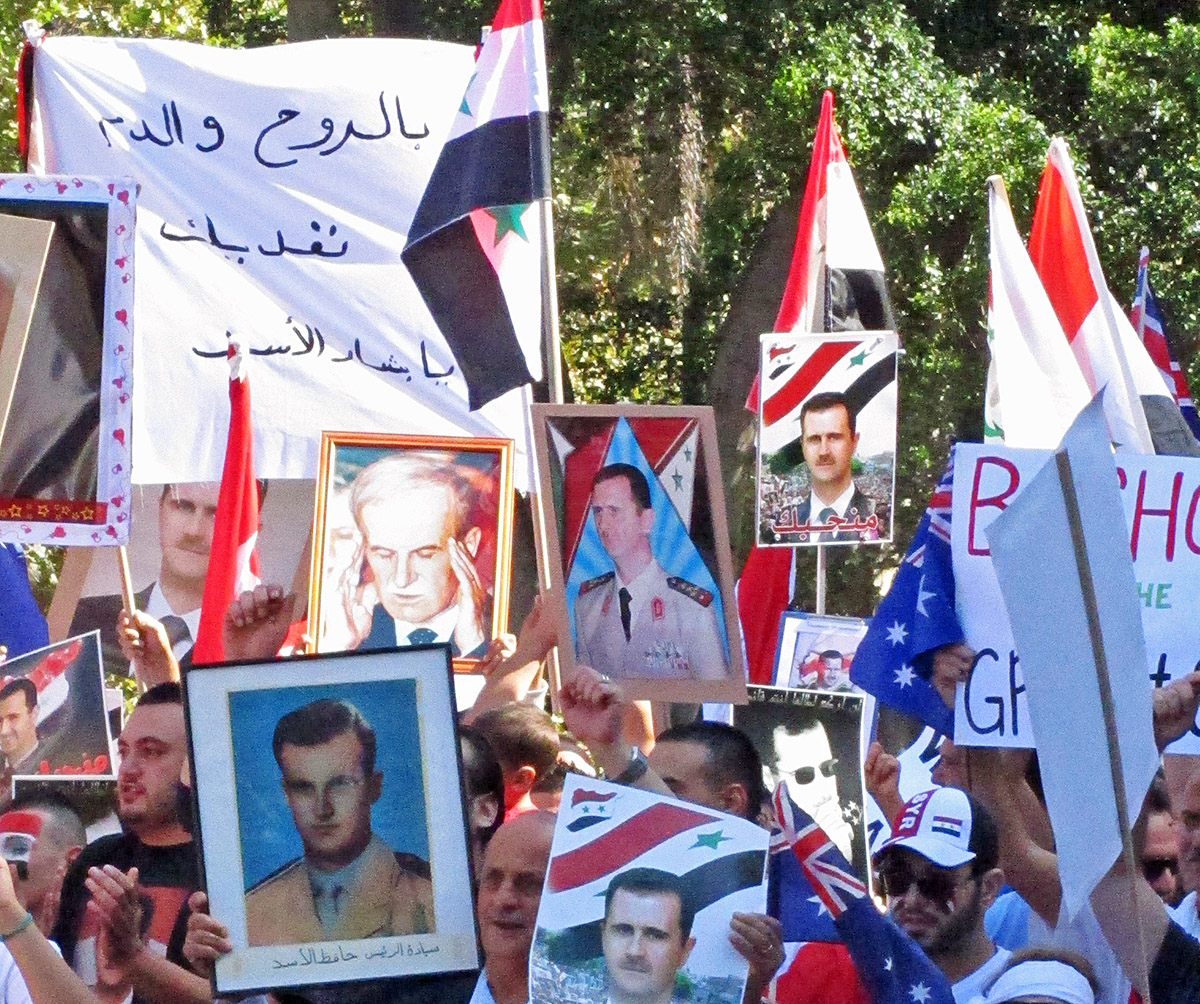
Hundreds in Sydney in support of the Syrian government, April 2011

- Australia: On 3 April, in Sydney and Melbourne there were large demonstrations in support for Bashar Al-Assad.

=== June ===
- 11 June:
  - Canada: Some 300 demonstrators called for Bashar al-Assad to step down in downtown Montreal.
  - United Kingdom: In London, over 100 gathered in a "peaceful but noisy protest" outside the Syrian embassy. Subsequently, some of the protesters and their families in Syria were intimidated by the Syrian authorities for taking part.
- United Kingdom: On 28 June, in London, around 30 Syrians gathered outside Downing Street.

=== October ===
- United Kingdom: On 4 October, in London, a demonstration co-ordinated by Amnesty International against the Syrian regime, around 40 Syrians from all over the UK held placards outside the Syrian embassy.
- United Kingdom: On 29 October, in London, hundreds rallied outside the embassy chanting "Free, Free, Syria!" Campaigners put their numbers at over 900. There was also a small counter-protest in support of Assad. The protest came a day after reports claims security forces killed about 40 people in Syria.
- 30 October
  - Canada: 100 people marched through downtown Montreal in solidarity with anti-government protestors in Syria.

=== December ===
- United Kingdom: On 20 December, in London, around 50 Syrians protest outside the embassy.

== 2012 ==
=== February ===
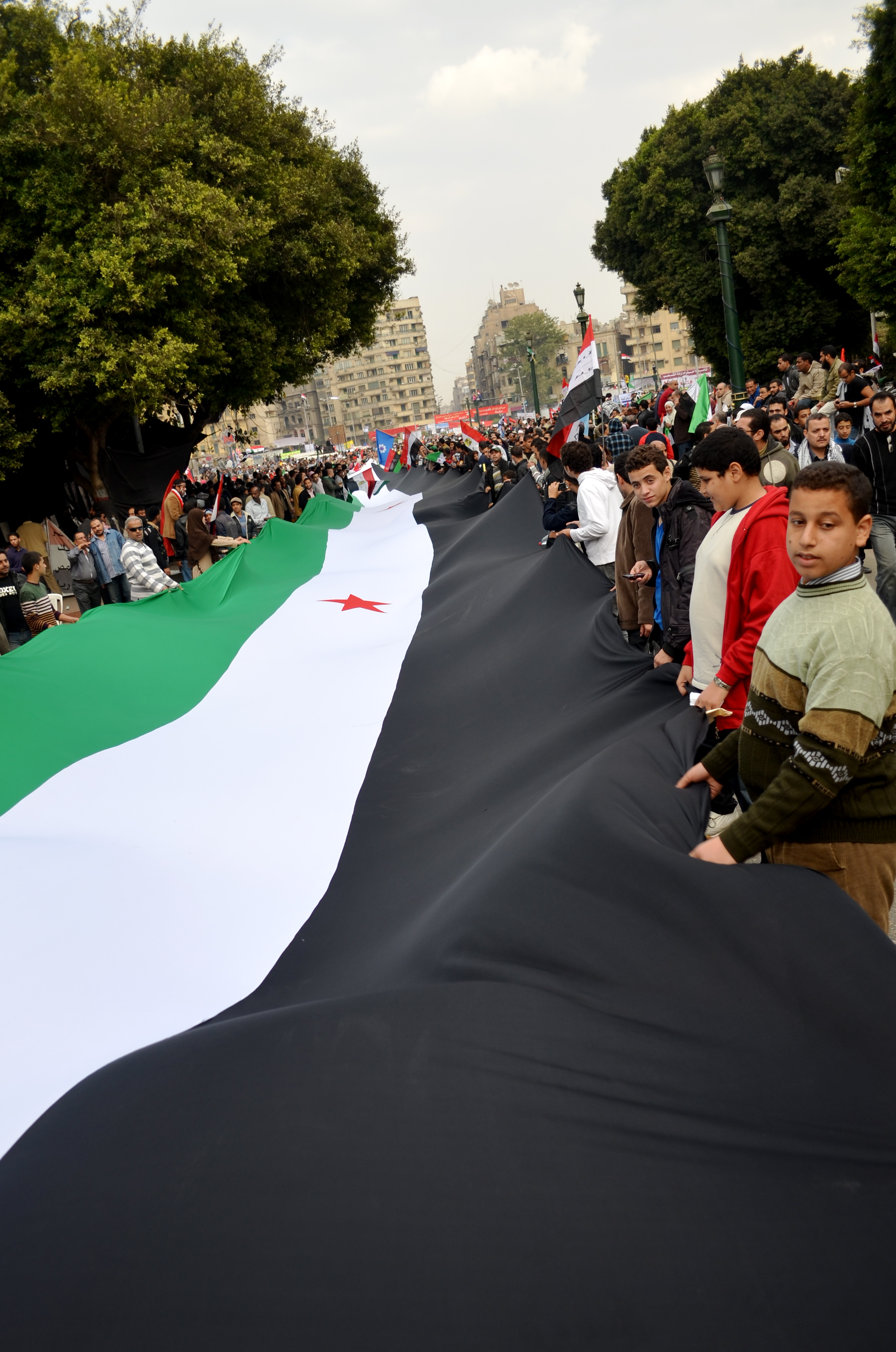
Demonstration in Cairo in solidarity with protestors in Syria, 4 February 2012

- 4 February
  - Egypt: In Cairo, around 50 protesters ransacked the Syrian embassy, setting the ground floor on fire.
  - Germany: In Berlin, around 20 people vandalized offices inside the Syrian embassy.
  - United Kingdom: In London, 150 gathered outside the Syrian embassy at 2am. after reports that more than 200 people had been killed in by government forces in Homs. Some protesters were arrested for disorder. Later in the day, another crowd of around 300 clashed with police outside the embassy.
- Australia: On 5 February, Syria's embassy in Canberra was ransacked by a group of 40 men, who embassy staff claimed were mostly not Syrian, and later in the day a protest of around 100 in Sydney's Hyde Park condemned Russia and China for vetoing a UN resolution that condemned the violence in Syria.
- Spain: On 11 February, in Barcelona, around 50 Syrian citizens protested against the regime and Russia's veto of at the UN.
- United States: On 17 February, in New Haven, Connecticut, around 150 members of the Syrian community protested against the Syrian government.
- United Kingdom: On 18 February, in London, thousands marched down Edgware Road to the Syrian embassy in an event organised by Hizb-ut Tahrir. Some placards read: "Bashar al-Assad - the killer of Muslims."

=== March ===
- Hīt, Iraq: 4,000 Sunnis protested against President Bashar Assad, many shouting slogans calling him a "coward" and "the enemy of God."

=== June ===
- Tirana, Albania: Hundreds of young Albanian marched on 8 June in Skanderbeg Square against the violence exercised by the Syrian army.

== 2013 ==
=== August ===
- United Kingdom: On 28 August, several hundred people, ranging from teenagers to the elderly, protested in London against British military involvement in Syria as it echoed the buildup of the Iraq War. Protesters held placards bearing slogans such as "Hands off Syria" and "Cut war, not welfare".
- 31 August:
  - Japan, Pakistan, Canada: Protesters took to the streets demanding USA not to strike Syria.

=== September ===
- 1 September
  - USA: Demonstrators rally in several cities opposing plans to launch military strikes over alleged deadly gas attack, believing the result will end up like the Iraq war.
  - UK: Thousands of people have protested in central London against possible US strikes on Syria.
  - France: In Paris, Protesters marched through the city condemning U.S. President Barack Obama and French President François Hollande for considering to strike Syria.

== 2017 ==
=== April ===
- 6 April
  - United States, Canada, and Italy: Following the 6 April U.S. missile strike on a Syrian government airfield ordered by President Donald Trump in response to an alleged chemical weapons attack, protests erupted across several cities in the United States, Canada, and Italy. Demonstrators opposed military intervention in Syria and carried placards bearing slogans such as “No War on Syria!” and “Hands off Syria!”.

== 2018 ==
=== March ===
- 8 March
  - Hundreds of women from different ethnic and religious backgrounds gathered at the Turkey–Syria border on International Women’s Day 2018 to protest the suffering of Syrian women during the civil war. Organizers said that over 6,000 women were being detained in Syrian prisons, where many are reportedly subjected to torture and sexual violence.
