= Siege of Antioch (disambiguation) =

Siege of Antioch may refer to:

- Siege of Antioch (51 BC) by the Parthians
- Siege of Antioch (253) by the Sassanid Persians
- Siege of Antioch (260) by the Sassanid Persians
- Siege of Antioch (540) by the Sassanid Persians
- Siege of Antioch (968–969) by the Byzantines
- Siege of Antioch (970–971) by the Fatimids
- Siege of Antioch (1084–1085) by the Seljuks
- Siege of Antioch (1097–1098) by the Crusaders

- Siège d'Antioche, French poem about the siege of 1098

- Siege of Antioch (1268) by the Mamelukes
