= Armenian Evangelical Christian Endeavor Union of Syria and Lebanon =

The Armenian Evangelical Christian Endeavor Union of Syria and Lebanon (Armenian: Լիբանանի և Սուրիոյ Հայ Աւետարանական Եկեղեցիներու Քրիստոնէական Ջանից Միութիւն) is the youth organization that is affiliated with the World Christian Endeavor Union and the Christian Endeavor International. The CE movement was first established in The Armenian Evangelical Church of Aintab in 1886 which was pastored at that time by Rev. A. Papazian. In 1923, when the Armenians were driven out of Cilicia, Armenian Evangelical Churches were reestablished in Syria and Lebanon followed by the reorganization of the youth ministry through The Christian Endeavour Union.

The Armenian Evangelical CE Union of Syria and Lebanon, founded in 1934, is a member of the Union of the Armenian Evangelical Churches in the Near East (UAECNE). It holds a general assembly once per year where reports are read, the budget is voted, some plans discussed, suggestions are given, and new members of the Christian Endeavor Executive Committee of Lebanon and Syria are elected. The CE Union mostly coordinates with the youth ministries of local churches and at the same time it runs two summer camp sites (Monte Verdi-Lebanon and Kessab-Syria) where various groups (Children, Teenage, Youth and Young couples) organize their summer camps and conferences.

== Members of the CE Union ==
- Christian Endeavor Young-Adults Association of the Armenian Evangelical Emmanuel Church (Amanos, Dora, Lebanon). Armenian Evangelical Emmanuel Church Chanitz
- Christian Endeavor Youth Association of the Armenian Evangelical Emmanuel Church (Amanos, Dora, Lebanon). Armenian Evangelical Emmanuel Youth Group (Badaniatz)
- Christian Endeavor Young-Adults Association of the Armenian Evangelical Church of Anjar (Anjar, Lebanon).
- Christian Endeavor Youth Association of the Armenian Evangelical Church of Anjar (Anjar, Lebanon).
- Christian Endeavor Young-Adults Association of the Armenian Evangelical First Church (Beirut, Lebanon).
- Christian Endeavor Youth Association of the Armenian Evangelical First Church (Beirut, Lebanon).
- Christian Endeavor Young-Adults Association of the Armenian Evangelical Church of Ashrafieh (Ashrafieh, Lebanon).
- Christian Endeavor Youth Association of the Armenian Evangelical Church of Ashrafieh (Ashrafieh, Lebanon).
- Christian Endeavor Young-Adults Association of the Armenian Evangelical Nor Marash Church (Bourj Hammoud, Lebanon).
- Christian Endeavor Youth Association of the Armenian Evangelical Nor Marash Church (Bourj Hammoud, Lebanon).
- Christian Endeavor Youth Association of the Armenian Evangelical Social Center (Trad, Lebanon)
- Christian Endeavor Young-Adults Association of the Armenian Evangelical Churches of Kessab (Kessab, Syria).
- Christian Endeavor Youth Association of the Armenian Evangelical Churches of Kessab (Kessab, Syria).
- Christian Endeavor Youth Association of the Armenian Evangelical Churches of Aleppo (Aleppo, Syria).
- Christian Endeavor Young-Adults Association of the Armenian Evangelical Emmanuel Church (Aleppo, Syria).
- Christian Endeavor Young-Adults Association of the Armenian Evangelical Bethel Church (Aleppo, Syria).
- Christian Endeavor Young-Adults Association of the Armenian Evangelical Martyrs Church (Aleppo, Syria).
- Central Committee of UAECNE (Lebanon).
- Christian Endeavor Executive Committee (Lebanon).
- Christian Endeavor Executive Committee (Syria).
- KCHAG Committee (Lebanon).
- KCHAG Committee (Syria).
