= List of medical schools in Syria =

This is a list of medical schools located in Syria.

| School | Funding | City | Established | First class | Degree | Street | WDOMSprofile | ECFMG eligible graduates |
|---|---|---|---|---|---|---|---|---|
| Damascus University Faculty of Medicine | Public | Damascus | 1903 | 1909 | MD | Al Mazzah Highway | F0000060 | 1953 - Current |
| University of Aleppo Faculty of Medicine | Public | Aleppo | 1967 | 1973 | MD | Omar Abu Risha Street | F0001438 | 1967 - Current |
| Latakia University Faculty of Medicine | Public | Latakia | 1974 | 1980 | MD | | F0001439 | 1979 - Current |
| Homs University Faculty of Medicine | Public | Homs | 1996 | 2002 | MD | | F0000184 | 1996 - Current |
| University of Kalamoon Faculty of Medicine | Private | Deir Atiyah | 2004 | 2010 | MD | Damascus - Homs Highway | F0001311 | 2004 - Current |
| Al-Furat University Faculty of Medicine | Public | Deir ez-Zor | 2006 | 2012 | MD | | F0001995 | 2005 - Current |
| Syrian Private University Faculty of Medicine | Private | Damascus | 2005 | 2011 | MD | Damascus - Daraa Highway | F0002430 | 2011 - Current |
| Al-Andalus University for Medical Sciences Faculty of Medicine | Private | Al-Qadmus | 2005 | 2006 | MD | | F0004011 | 2017 - Current |
| Hama University Faculty of Medicine | Public | Hama | 2012 | 2018 | MD | Janob al Malaab / Hama - Homs Highway | F0004012 | 2018 - Current |
| University of Tartous College of Medicine | Public | Tartous | 2014 | 2020 | MD | | F0005211 | 2020 - Current |
| Idlib University Faculty of Medicine | Public | Idlib | 2015 | | MD | | F0005502 | |
| Al Sham Private University Faculty of Medicine | Private | Damascus | 2017 | 2023 | MD | Baramkeh | F0007532 | |
| Al Hawash Private University Faculty of Medicine | Private | Al-Hawash | 2016 | 2022 | MD | Al-Mouzeina | F0007934 | |
| University of Health Sciences (Turkey) Çobanbey Faculty of Medicine | Public | Al-Rai | 2021 | | MD | | | |
