= Wildlife of Syria =

The wildlife of Syria is the flora and fauna of Syria, a country at the eastern end of the Mediterranean Sea. Besides its coastline, the country has a coastal plain, mountain ranges in the west, a semi-arid steppe area in the centre occupying most of the country, and a desert area in the east. Each of these zones has its own characteristic animals and plants.

== Geography ==
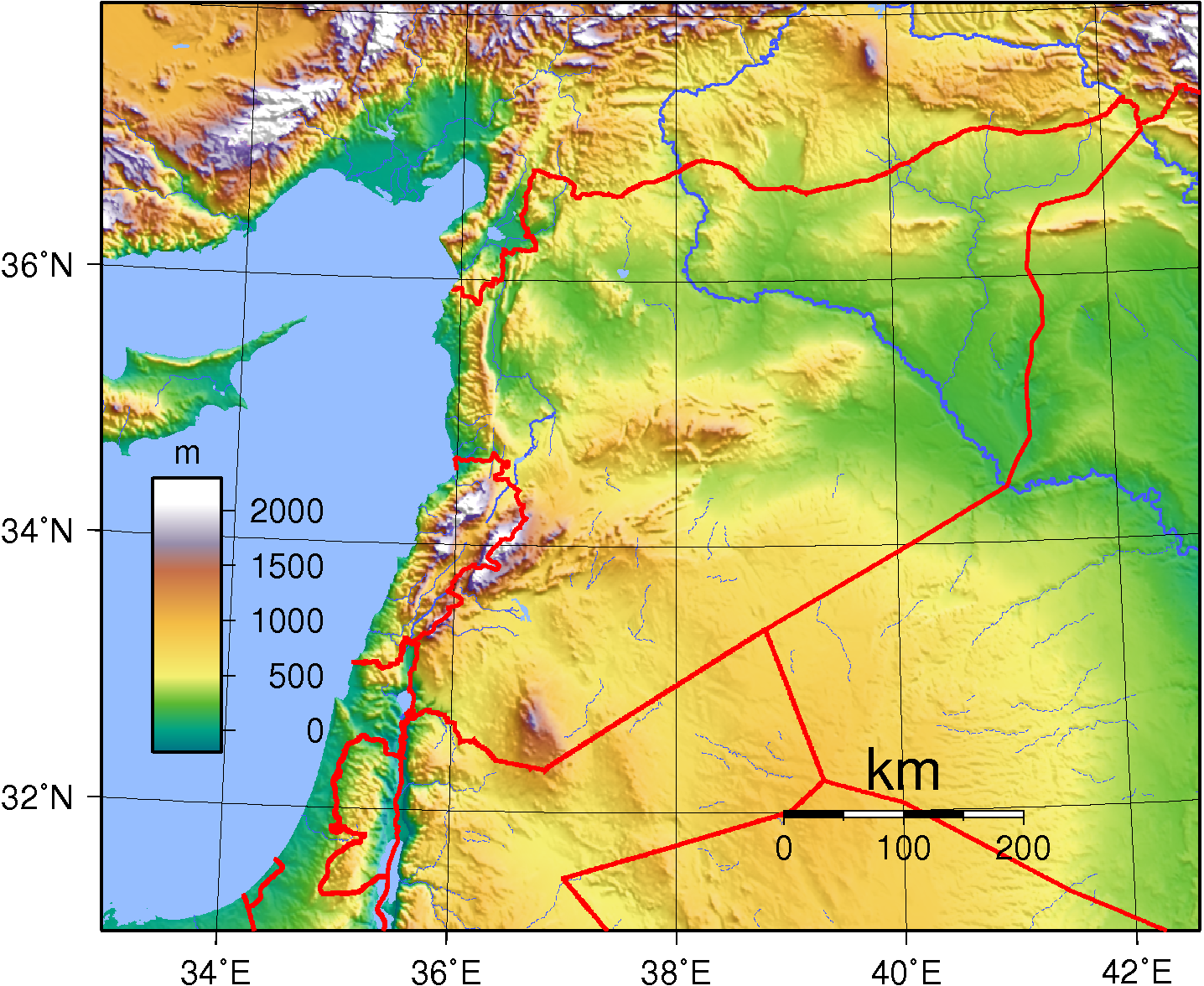
Topographical map of Syria

Syria is located in the Middle East at the eastern end of the Mediterranean Sea. It is bordered by Turkey to the north, Lebanon and Israel to the west, Jordan to the south and Iraq to the east. The topography consists of a narrow coastal plain in the west which rises up to the Syrian Coastal Mountain Range which runs parallel with the coast. South of this is the Homs Gap, beyond which are Mount Lebanon and the Anti-Lebanon Mountains which separate Syria from Lebanon. Further east is a large area of steppe or Badia in the centre of the country. This is divided by the Euphrates river, on which a dam was built in 1973 creating a reservoir, Lake Assad, which is the largest lake in Syria. In the east and south of the country is the Syrian Desert and in the far south is the Jabal al-Druze Mountain Range.

The coastal mountains and the coast have a Mediterranean climate. Here the winter is mild and wet, with up to 1,000 mm (40 in) of annual precipitation, and the summer, from May to October, hot and dry. Further inland, the rainfall levels decrease rapidly, being 250 to 500 mm (10 to 20 in) on the steppes and less than 130 mm (5 in) in the desert. There is also a much greater variation between maximum and minimum temperature inland, with frosts sometimes occurring at night and temperatures rising as high as 45 °C (113 °F) by day in summer.

== Flora ==
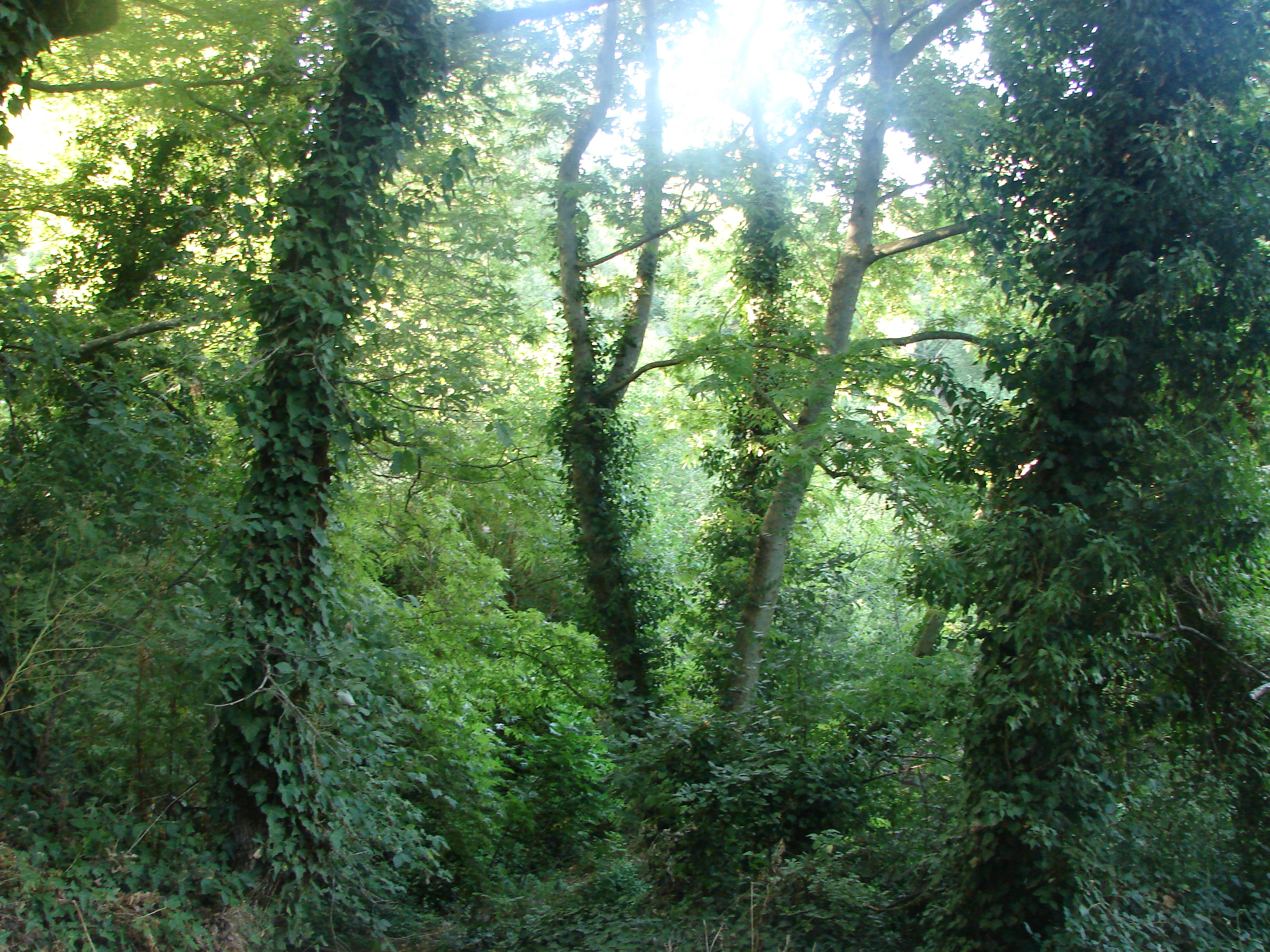
Al-Batar forest near Tartous

Around 3,100 species of flowering plant have been recorded in Syria as well as about 112 gymnosperms. The country can be considered to be at a crossroads between various vegetation zones and the flora shows influences from three continents, Europe, Asia and Africa. The ice ages pushed Palearctic species further south, and when the climate ameliorated, some species clung on in mountainous regions of Turkey, Syria and Lebanon. The prevailing westerly winds bring greater precipitation near the coast and the vegetation on the western side of the coastal mountain ranges differs from that on the eastern side, which differs again from inland mountain ranges and once again from the drought-resistant plants that grow on the eastern plateau.

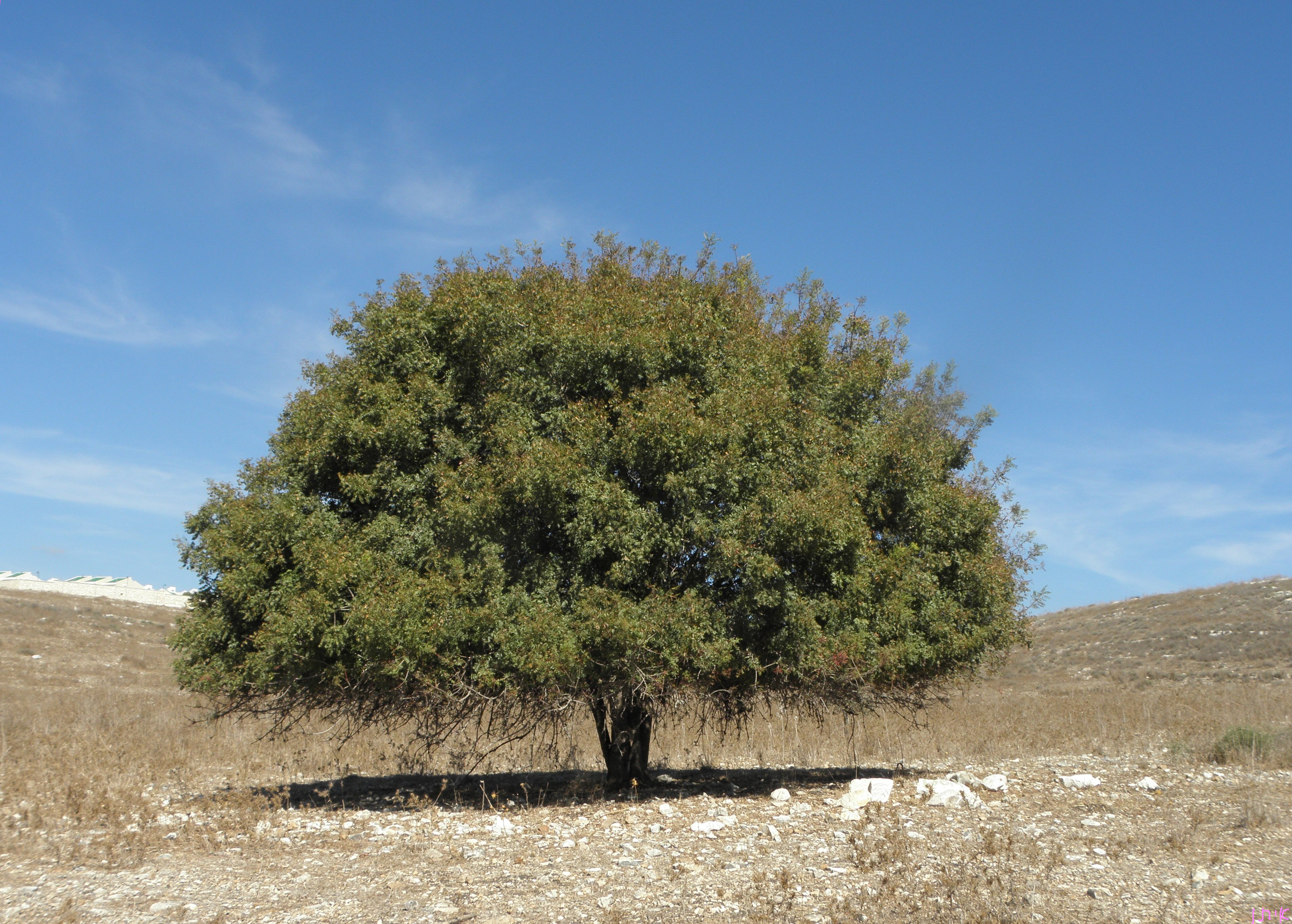
The terebinth, a tree of semi-arid plains

In the west of the country, mild wet winters and hot dry summers provide ideal conditions for the Eastern Mediterranean conifer-sclerophyllous-broadleaf forests of the region which include evergreen oaks, Aleppo pines and other conifers. Where the trees have been removed for timber, sclerophyllous scrub predominates, such as maquis shrubland, and garrigue in calcareous areas. At the beginning of the twentieth century, forests covered about one third of the country, but a hundred years later, this had reduced to about 3%. The remaining forest cover is mostly in the Syrian Coastal Mountain Range and consists of thorny and glossy-leaved trees such as common box, Myrtus communis, broom, terebinth, strawberry tree and wild olive.

Plants found in the semi-arid and arid regions include bulbous plants such as tulips, fritillaries, Asphodeline damascena, Asphodeline lutea, crocus, iris, Drimia maritima, Colchicum hierosolymitanum and Asphodelus aestivus, and other plants such as Papaver dubium, Papaver rhoeas, Malva parviflora, Plantago ovata, Plantago coronopus, Paliurus spina-christi, Ziziphus lotus, Adonis aleppica, Adonis palaestina and Eryngium maritimum. The terebinth tree (Pistacia palaestina) grows in semi-arid areas and is a traditional source of turpentine, and the shrub Caroxylon vermiculatum, which regenerates with as little as 70 mm (2.8 in) of rainfall, provides good fodder for livestock.

== Fauna ==
Syria has a diverse fauna with 125 species of mammal, 394 of bird, 127 of reptile, 16 of amphibian and 157 of freshwater fishes recorded in the country. Human activities have affected the biodiversity of the fauna. The Asiatic lion and cheetah, Caspian tiger and leopard (subspecies P. p. nimr and P. p. tulliana) used to be present, but they have died out in the country, and so the brown bear and the gray wolf are the largest carnivores remaining. Also present are the red fox, striped hyena, golden jackal, Egyptian mongoose, least weasel, marbled polecat, honey badger, Caucasian badger and European otter. The cat family are represented by the caracal, jungle cat, sand cat and wildcat. Grazing animals include the mountain gazelle and the goitered gazelle, the roe deer, wild goat, Nubian ibex and Arabian oryx. There are also rock hyrax, hedgehogs, hares, shrews and bats. The many species of rodents include squirrels, dormice, jerboas, gerbils, hamsters, mole-rats, jirds, voles, rats, mice and spiny mice.

Ten species of whale have been recorded off the coast as well as the endangered Mediterranean monk seal. Four species of turtle are sometimes seen, the most common being the loggerhead sea turtle, and about 295 species of marine fish have been recorded in Syria.

Of the nearly four hundred species of bird recorded in the country, many are migrants, particularly visiting the coastal mountain range, the Euphrates valley and seasonal salt lakes that form in arid regions. Sabkhat al-Jabbul is a nature reserve at one of these salt lakes and is visited by migrating greater flamingoes. Endangered breeding birds include a few pairs of northern bald ibis in the north of the country, the lesser kestrel and the great bustard. Rare visiting species include the corn crake, Dalmatian pelican, white-headed duck and eastern imperial eagle.
