= Geology of Syria =

The geology of Syria includes ancient metamorphic rocks from the Precambrian belonging to the Arabian Craton, as well as numerous marine sedimentary rocks and some erupted basalt up to recent times.

== Geologic history, stratigraphy and tectonics ==
The oldest rocks in Syria are amphibolite, marble and amphibolite schist from the Precambrian which outcrop on the surface across much of the south. Carboniferous rocks from the Paleozoic appear in the north, in the vicinity of Hakem and El-Gharb.

=== Mesozoic (251–66 million years ago) ===
In the Mesozoic, an ophiolite zone with serptenized peridotite, diabase, spilite, pillow lava, tuff, argillite and radiolarite formed in the north and is present in northern Latakia close to the Turkish border.

Mesozoic rocks tend to be more numerous in the region, such as Jurassic limestone, marl, anhydrite and gypsum common in the west. Basalt at the base marks the beginning of the Cretaceous, ascending into clay, limestone, sandstone and dolomite from the Turonian and Cenomanian. Campanian are marked by detrital limestone with flint interbeds and chalk, while chalky limestone and marl are characteristic of the Maastrichtian.

=== Cenozoic (66 million years ago–present) ===
At the beginning of the Cenozoic, chalk, limestone, marl and clay deposition continued through the Paleocene and Eocene. The Oligocene brought a shift to sandstone and limestone. In the early Miocene, conglomerates became more common and quartz sands of continental origin appeared in the Palmyrides mountain belt. Some basalts erupted during the Helvetian.

The Tortonian has limestone, marl and conglomerate in the northwest and similar units plus clay, salt, and gypsum in the Al-Furat Basin. Basalt, tuff, breccia, limestone, clay, sandstone and conglomerate were common from the Pliocene, overlain by alluvial conglomerate, basalt and flood plain deposits from the Quaternary.
