= List of cathedrals in Syria =

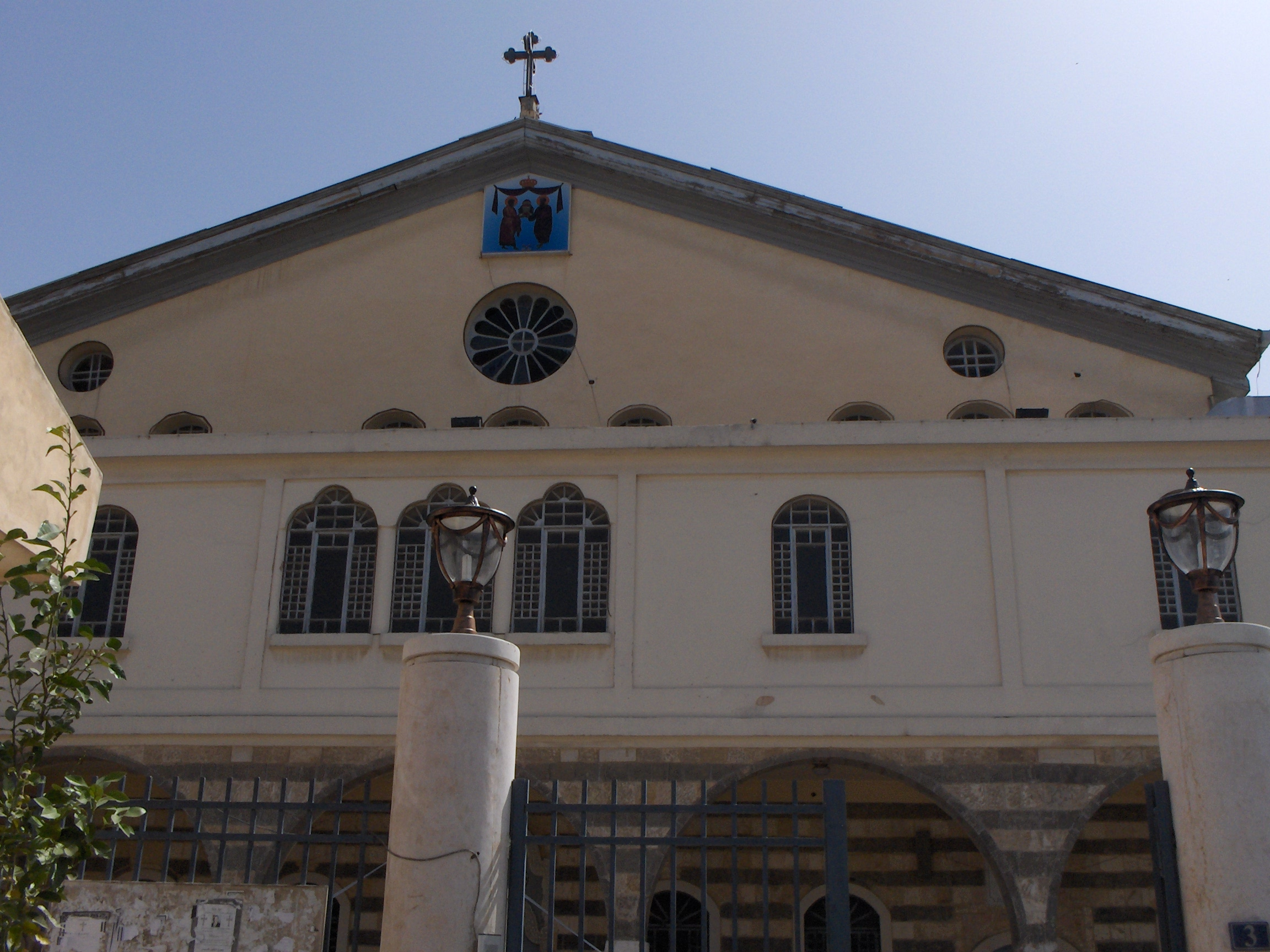
Mariamite Cathedral of Damascus.

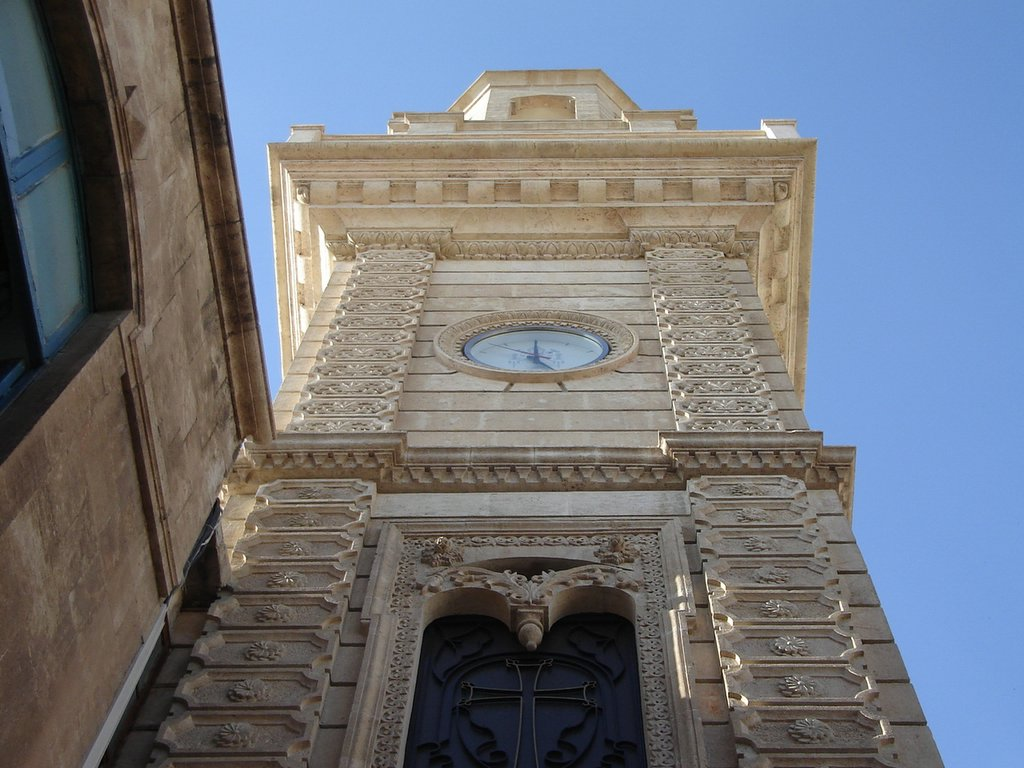
Forty Martyrs Cathedral in Aleppo.

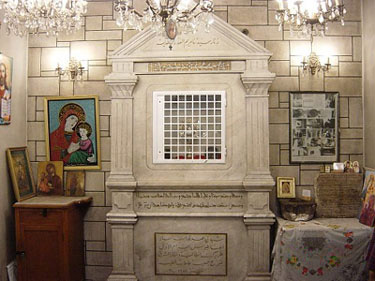
Saint Mary of the Holy Belt Cathedral in Homs.

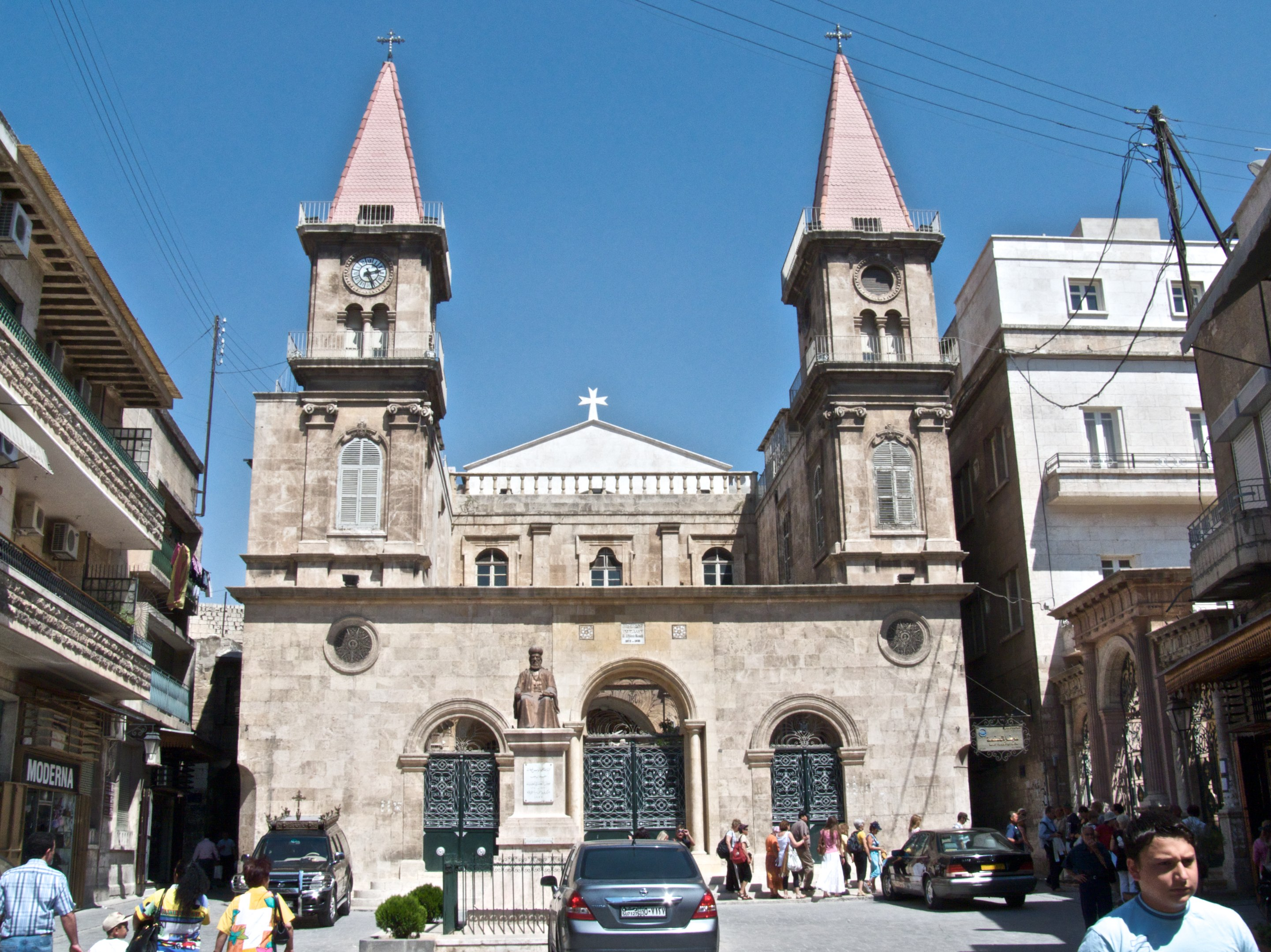
St. Elias Maronite Cathedral in Aleppo.

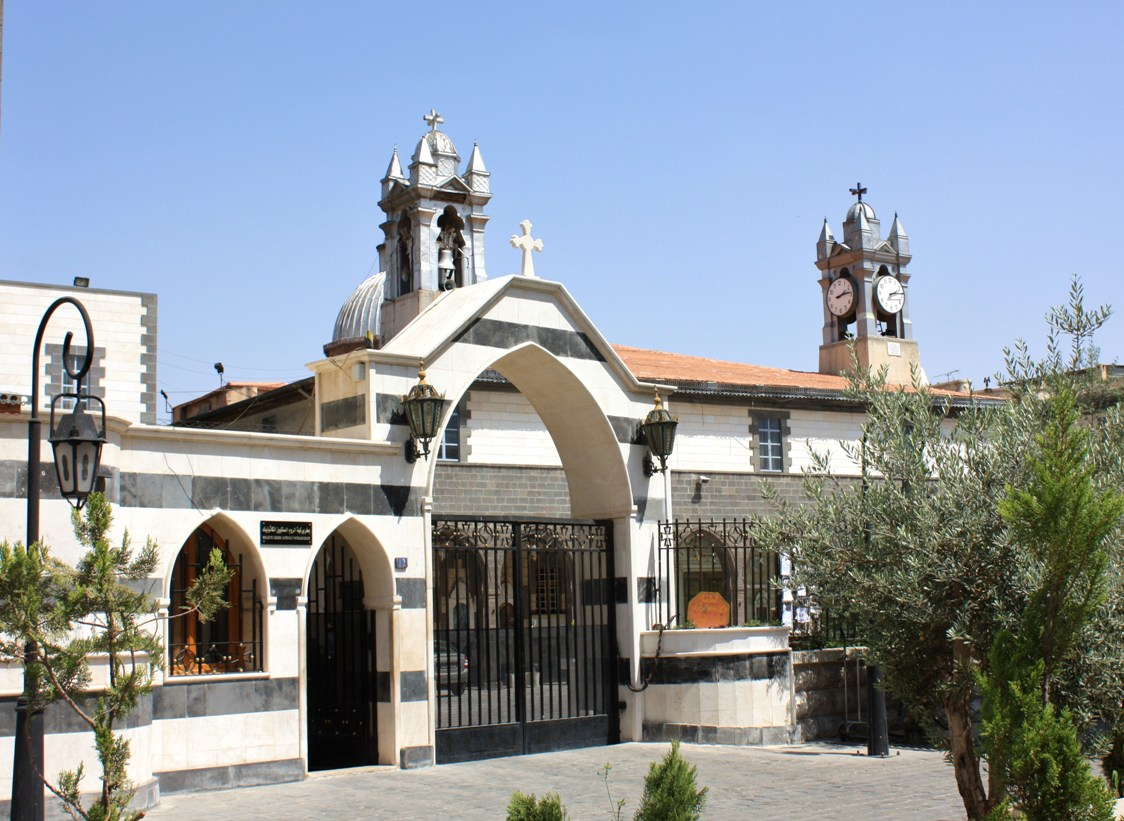
Cathedral of Our Lady of the Dormition in Damascus.

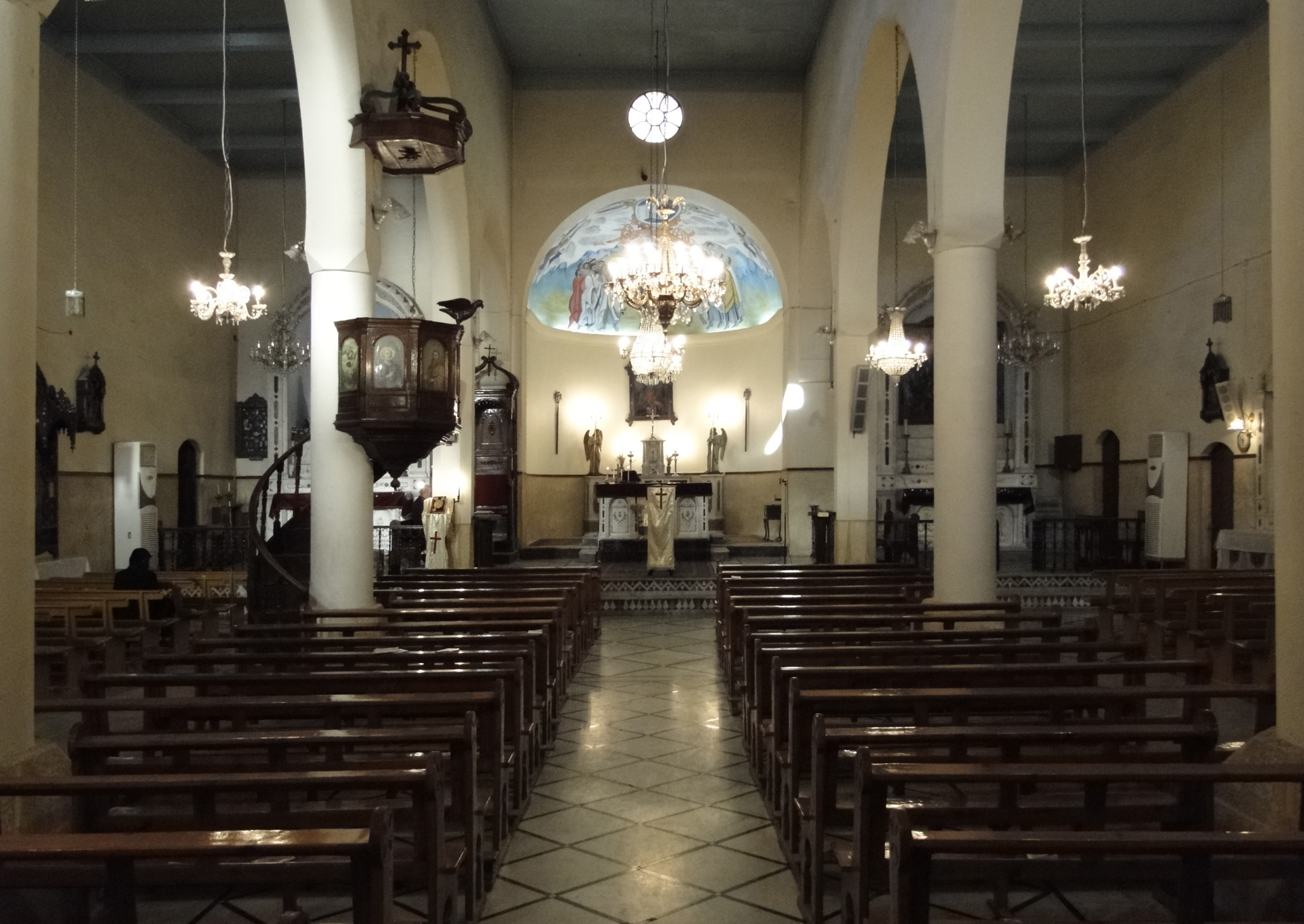
Syriac Catholic Cathedral of Saint Paul in Damascus.

This is the list of cathedrals in Syria sorted by denomination.

== Catholic ==
Cathedrals of the Catholic Church in Syria:

- Latin Rite
  - Cathedral of St. Francis of Assisi in Aleppo
- Maronite Rite
  - St. Elias Maronite Cathedral in Aleppo
  - Cathedral of Our Lady of Latakia in Latakia
  - Maronite Cathedral in Damascus
- Melkite Greek
  - Greek-Melkite Cathedral of the Virgin Mary in Aleppo
  - Greek-Melkite Patriarchal Cathedral of the Dormition of Our Lady, Damascus in Damascus
  - Cathedral of Our Lady of Dormition in Khabab
  - Greek-Melkite Cathedral of Our Lady of Peace in Homs
  - Cathedral of Our Lady of the Annunciation in Latakia
- Syriac Catholic
  - Cathedral of Our Lady of the Assumption in Aleppo
  - Syriac Catholic Cathedral of Saint Paul in Damascus
  - Cathedral of the Holy Spirit in Homs
- Armenian Catholic
  - Cathedral Our Lady of Pity in Aleppo
  - Church of the Queen of the Universe in Damascus
- Chaldean Catholic
  - St. Joseph's Cathedral in Aleppo

== Eastern Orthodox ==
Eastern Orthodox cathedrals in Syria:

- Mariamite Cathedral in Damascus (Antiochian Eastern-Orthodox)
- Cathedral of Elijah the Prophet in Aleppo (Greek Orthodox)
- Forty Martyrs Cathedral in Homs
- St. George's Cathedral in Latakia
- St. George's Cathedral in Hama

== Oriental Orthodox ==
Oriental Orthodox cathedrals in Syria:

- Cathedral of Saint Ephrem the Syrian in Aleppo (Syriac Orthodox)
- Forty Martyrs Cathedral in Aleppo (Armenian Apostolic)
- Saint Mary of the Holy Belt (Um Al Zennar) Syriac Orthodox Cathedral in Homs (Syriac Orthodox)
- Cathedral of Saint George in Damascus (Syriac Orthodox)

== See also ==
- List of cathedrals
- Christianity in Syria
