= Syrian government response to the Syrian revolution =

This article details the Syrian Ba'athist government's response to protests and civilian uprisings of the Syrian revolution which began in early 2011, that unravelled the socio-political stability of Syria, eventually plunging the country into a nationwide civil war by mid-2012.

== Arrests and convictions ==
Days before protests planned for 5 February 2011, Syrian authorities arrested several political activists, such as businessman Ghassan al-Najar, leader of the Islamic Democratic movement, the writer Ali al-Abdallah, Abbas Abbas, from the Syrian Communist Party and several other political personalities of Kurdish background, such as Adnan Mustafa.

On 14 February, blogger and student Tal al-Mallouhi, who had been imprisoned since 27 December 2009, was convicted of spying for the United States and sentenced to five years in prison. Washington denied these allegations and asked for al-Mallohi's immediate release. On 15 February under pressure from human rights organizations, the Syrian government released Ghassan al-Najar after he went on a hunger strike following his arrest for calling for mass protests.

On 22 March Syrian authorities arrested Loay Hussein, a human rights campaigner. On 25 March there were reports of mass arrests and detentions of protesters taking place.

On 29 April Dorothy Parvaz of Al Jazeera arrived in Damascus and was not heard of for several days The Syrian government later confirmed that she had been detained, she had attempted to enter the country illegally with an expired Iranian passport. She was released on 18 May after detention in Syria and Iran.

Many news outlets reported that a prominent LGBT anti-government blogger called Amina Arraf was allegedly arrested by Syrian authorities, but questions arose of whether she was a real person in the first place. She later tuned out to be an American man blogging under a false name, who had used a photo of a random British woman as that of "Amina".

Zainab al-Hosni, who was claimed to have been detained and beheaded by Syrian authorities, later turned out to be alive.

A Syrian American man, Mohamad Anas Haitham Soueid, was charged by U.S. federal prosecutors on 5 October with tracking Syrian Americans supporting the uprising in the United States and passing information to Syrian authorities, who then arrested family members of the dissidents living in Syria. The U.S. government alleges that Soueid met with Assad during a two-week trip to Syria in summer 2011.

In October, Amnesty International published a report showing that at least 30 Syrian dissidents living in Canada, Chile, France, Germany, Spain, Sweden, United Kingdom and United States, faced intimidation by Syrian embassy officials, and that in some cases, their relatives in Syria were harassed, detained and tortured. Syrian embassy officials in London and Washington, D.C. were alleged to have taken photographs and videos of local Syrian dissidents and sent them to Syrian authorities, who then retaliated against their families.

In January 2012 a 718-page document claiming to be a leaked wanted suspects list from the Syrian Interior Ministry was published on the Internet. The list includes the names of thousands of dissidents accused of taking part in protests as well as armed activity against the Assad government. The document also names informants for the government.

== Censorship ==
On 5 February 2011, Internet services were said to have been curbed, although Facebook and YouTube were reported to have been restored three days later. Suggestions were made that easing the ban could be a way to track activists.
As of 29 July 2011, social media censorship took these forms:
– Facebook: Homepage is normally accessible. HTTPS connection is blocked so users aren't able to log in.
– YouTube: Homepage and all other pages are normally accessible but the streaming domain, however, is blocked. Users can surf the website but can't watch videos.
– Twitter: No direct blocking, but it's undergoing heavy throttling (limiting the number of connections) rendering the service inaccessible.

In August 2011, Syrian security forces attacked the country's best-known political cartoonist, Ali Farzat, a noted critic of Syria's government and its five-month crackdown on pro-democracy demonstrators and dissent. Relatives of the severely beaten humorist told Western media the attackers threatened to break Farzat's bones as a warning for him to stop drawing cartoons of government officials, particularly Assad. Ferzat was hospitalized with fractures in both hands and blunt force trauma to the head.

== Allegations of rape ==
Syrian activists have accused government forces of abducting and raping women in rebellious parts of the country, possibly using sexual violence as a means of terrorising the population and quelling dissent. An opposition campaigner supplied The Globe and Mail with details about six previously unknown cases of violence against women, saying that more such incidents remain hidden as Damascus struggles to contain the uprising. According to Syrian refugees who fled to Turkey, soldiers of the Syrian Arab Army allegedly committed mass-rapes and mutilation of numerous women.

== Concessions from Syrian Government ==
On 19 March 2011 by legislative decree 35, Assad shortened the length of mandatory army conscription from 21 months to 18 months.

On 20 March, the Syrian government announced that it would release 15 children who had been arrested on 6 March for writing pro-democracy graffiti.

On 23 March, by regional decree 120, Faisal Ahmad Kolthoum was removed as Governor of Daraa.

On 24 March, Assad's media adviser, Buthaina Shaaban, said that the government will be "studying the possibility of lifting the emergency law and licensing political parties". The Syrian government also announced a cut in personal taxation rates, an increase in public sector salaries of LS 1,500 ($32.60 US) a month and pledges to increase press freedom, create more employment opportunities, and reduce corruption.

On 26 March, Syrian authorities freed 260 political prisoners – 70 according to other sources – mostly Islamists, held in Saidnaya prison.

On 27 March, Bouthaina Shaaban confirmed that the emergency law would be lifted, but did not say when.

On 29 March, the Syrian cabinet submitted its official resignation to Assad.

On 31 March, Assad set up a committee of legal experts to study legislation that would pave the way to replacing decades-old emergency laws. The committee was to complete its study by 25 April. Assad also set up a judicial committee tasked with investigating the circumstances that led to the death of Syrian civilians and security forces in the cities of Daraa and Latakia.

The government, dominated by the Shia Alawite sect, also made some concessions to the majority Sunni and some minority populations in April. On 6 April, it was reported that teachers would once again be allowed to wear the niqab, and that the government had closed the country's only casino. Of the 200,000 descendants of Syrian Kurds denied citizenship in 1962, 120,000 who were labeled "foreigners" were granted citizenship.

On 7 April, Assad relieved the Governor of Homs province from his duties and issued a decree granting nationality to thousands of Kurds living in the eastern al Hasakah province while the Syrian Observatory for Human Rights said the 48 Kurds were released, more than a year after they were arrested in the eastern city of Raqqa. This came a day after Assad met with Kurdish tribal leaders to discuss citizenship issues concerning the Kurds of Syria's north-eastern provinces, as hundreds of thousands of Kurds were stripped of their citizenship rights as a result of the 1962 national census.

On 16 April, Assad spoke to the People's Assembly in a televised speech, stating that he expected his government to lift the emergency law the following week. He acknowledged there is a gap between citizens and the state, and that government has to "keep up with the aspirations of the people". Later in the day he welcomed the new ministers in the Cabinet of Syria with a speech containing more specifics. He spoke of the importance of reaching "a state of unity, unity between the government, state institutions and the people"; stressed the need for dialogue and consultation in multiple channels, popular support, trust and transparency; explained the interrelatedness of reform and the needs of citizens for services, security and dignity. He stated the first priorities were citizenship for Kurds, lifting the state of emergency in the coming week or at the latest the week after, regulating demonstrations without chaos and sabotage, political party law, local administration law in both structure and elections, and new and modern media law, all with public timeframes. The next topics were unemployment, the economy, rural services, attracting investment, the public and private sectors, justice, corruption, petty bribery, tax reform and reducing government waste, followed by tackling government itself with more participation, e-government, decentralization, effectiveness and efficiency, as well as closer cooperation with civil society, mass organizations and trade unions.

On 19 April, a bill was approved by the Syrian government to lift the emergency law. Two days later, Assad signed legislative decree 50 into law.

On 30 April, Prime Minister Adel Safar announced a comprehensive plan for reforms in the coming weeks in three areas: political reform, security and judicial reform; economic reform and social policies; and the development of administration and governmental work.

On 24 July, a draft law was created, to be debated by parliament, to allow more political parties, under the conditions that they were not based on religious, tribal or ethnic beliefs and does not discriminate against gender or race. Protesters have dismissed the law as superficial, as Article 8 of the Syrian Constitution, which grants the Ba'ath Party the role of leader of the state and society, would need to be repealed.

On 12 December, local elections took place for the first time under a new local administration law. The reformed electoral law gives the local administrations more powers and financial independence, ensures supervision of the electoral process by judicial committees, and abolishes the "closed lists" system which guaranteed 50 per cent of all municipal seats to the Ba'athist National Progressive Front.

On 28 December, the state released 755 detainees "whose hands were not stained with Syrian blood".

As part of the Arab League peace plan, Syria released 3,500 prisoners on 3 January and a further 552 detainees on 5 January. According to state news agency SANA, 5,255 detainees have been released as of 22 January, with the release of further prisoners still continuing.

On 8 March, Syria's deputy oil minister Abdo Hussameldin announced his defection and resignation on a YouTube video, denouncing Russia and China for backing the government and advising his colleagues to abandon the "sinking ship".

=== 26 February constitutional referendum ===
On 15 February, Syrian state television announced that the government will hold a referendum on a new constitution on 26 February 2012, in an attempt to end the eleven-month conflict. One of the amendments in the draft would replace the old article 8, which entrenches the power of the Ba'ath party, with a new article reading: The state's political system is based on political pluralism and power is practiced democratically through voting.

Parliamentary elections were held within 90 days after ratification of the new constitution.

==== Rallies in support of the Assad government ====
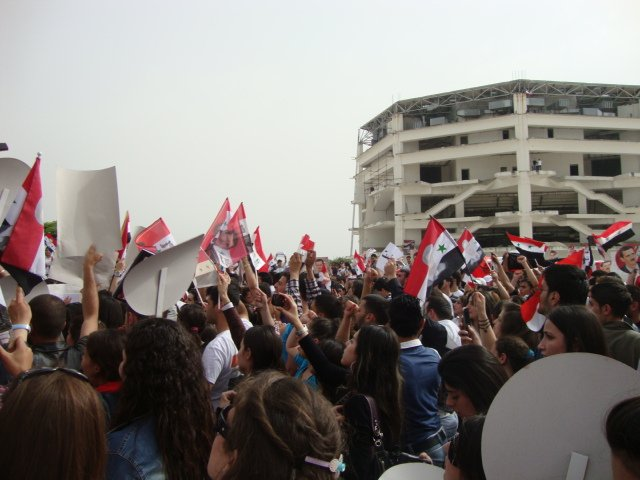
A pro-Assad student rally at Tishreen University (today Latakia University.

The Guardian reported on 22 March 2011 that one response of the Syrian authorities to the unrest was to organise pro-Assad rallies. Pro-Assad rallies were held in the capital city of Damascus on 25 March. Since the start of the uprising, large crowds have rallied in the support of the Assad government, especially in the cities of Damascus, Aleppo, and Lattakia

Assad government orgnanized protests in front of the French and Turkish embassies in Syria, over their condemnations of the Syrian government's crackdown of protests, and on 15 June, people at a pro-government demonstration in Damascus carried a 2.3 kilometres (1.4 mi)-long Syrian flag down Mezzeh boulevard. State television reported that two million people attended to express Syrian national unity and Syria's rejection of foreign interference in its internal affairs. The day after Assad addressed the nation on 20 June, Syrian state television claimed that over one million people gathered in Umayyad Square in Damascus, and there were demonstrations in Homs, Aleppo, Sweida, Latakia, Deraa, Hasaka, Tartous, and elsewhere to express support for the reforms the president said he would carry out.

According to a poll conducted by YouGov for the Qatari institute The Doha Debates, that sampled 97 Syrian online users, 55% of Syrians polled in December 2011 did not want Assad to resign. As of 2009, Syria has 19.6% Internet users as percentage of population according to the World Bank.

Following the Russian military intervention in Syria in 2015, with pro-Assad protesters waved Russian flags and pictures of Vladimir Putin alongside the Syrian flag and portraits of Assad, chanting 'Thank you Russia' signs, praising the Russian military intervention.

== Media coverage ==
Al Jazeera provided analysis of the largest opposition parties in Syria that might have great political influence following any change of power: Syrian People's Democratic Party, Muslim Brotherhood, National Salvation Front, Movement for Justice and Development, Reform Party, Arab Socialist Movement, Arab Socialist Union, Arab Revolutionary Workers Party, Communist Labour Party, and others. On 9 March 2011, Al Jazeera continued its reporting with an analysis of political detainees in Syria, and two days later another special report reported that many activists were displeased that the general decree of amnesty did not include political prisoners. Al Jazeera launched an Internet page for the Syrian revolt as part of its "Arab Revolution Spring" portal.

On 23 March, a column was published in The Daily Telegraph by Con Coughlin, the newspaper's executive foreign editor, calling for the creation of a no-fly zone over Syria to protect innocent protesters.

=== Internet activists ===
Mobiles

Since international news media was banned in Syria, the main source of information - and disinformation - has been private videos usually taken by mobile phone cameras and uploaded to YouTube. As with many second-hand reports, such videos are difficult to verify independently, and several TV stations have shown older footage from Iraq and Lebanon, which was claimed to have been filmed in Syria.

==== Other ====
On 15 January 2012, SANA, the official Syrian news agency, announced a "general amnesty for crimes committed" during the uprising. The amnesty covered between 15 March 2011 and 15 January 2012. Hours later, Syrian authorities released Haitham al-Maleh, an 80-year-old former judge, one of Assad's most outspoken critics, under an amnesty marking the anniversary of the 1963 coup which brought the Ba'ath Party to power. Twelve Syrian human rights organisations called on the government to scrap the state of emergency which had been in effect for almost 50 years.

On 16 February, government critic and director of the Organisation for Democracy and Freedom in Syria (ODFS) Ribal al-Assad, son of Rifaat al-Assad and cousin to Syrian President Bashar al-Assad, held a press conference in London, in which he made it clear that he "does not want to see a Syrian revolution, but a peaceful change of power". In a 5 April interview, Ribal al-Assad warned of Syria's risk for a civil war, saying

Everyone in Syria has seen what is happening in Arab countries but in Syria there are many minorities. Everyone has arms and everyone will want to defend their own people. It is like what happened in Iraq.
