= Scouts of Syria =

National Scout and Guide organization of Syria

- كشاف سورية

- Guides Branch
- Age range: 7-23
- Headquarters: Damascus
- Country: Syria
- Founded: 1912
- Membership: 9,358
- Affiliation: World Association of Girl Guides and Girl Scouts, World Organization of the Scout Movement

Former Scouts of Syria emblem, in use until 2012, when it was changed in the midst of the Syrian civil war.

Scouts of Syria (Arabic: كشاف سورية) is the national Scout and Guide organization of Syria. Scouting in Syria was founded in 1912; Guiding started in the 1950s. The coeducational association serves 9,358 members and is a member of both the World Organization of the Scout Movement and the World Association of Girl Guides and Girl Scouts.

== History ==
=== Scouting ===
Scouting started in Syria in 1912, when the country was part of the Ottoman Empire. In 1924, a federation of Christian and Muslim associations from Lebanon and Syria became member of the World Organization of the Scout Movement (WOSM). In the 1930s and 1940s, this federation was affected by the political situation in the region, and especially by the separation of Syria and Lebanon, which led to the registration of the Boy Scouts de Syrie as a separate member of WOSM in August 1949.

Syria hosted the 1st Arab Regional Scout Jamboree in 1954 and the 3rd Arab Regional Scout Jamboree and the 1st Arab Regional Scout Conference, both in 1958. During this conference, Damascus was named as headquarters of the Arab Scout Region.

The Boy Scouts de Syrie were removed from WOSM-membership in November 1999 due non-compliance with the constitutional obligations of WOSM (especially the non-payment of membership fees). Syria still participated in Scouting activities with Arab Scout Region neighbours while seeking return to WOSM membership. On July 1, 2008, it was readmitted to WOSM.

Ali al-Dandachi, a member of the association, served on the World Scout Committee of WOSM from 1951 until 1957 and. In 1969, he was awarded the Bronze Wolf, for his services to World Scouting. In 1980, Ibrahim Zakaria was also awarded the Bronze Wolf.

=== Guiding ===
Guiding in Syria started the 1950s. About 1960, the Guide Association became a member of the World Association of Girl Guides and Girl Scouts (WAGGGS). The Arab Region of WAGGGS held its 3rd Arab Regional Conference in Damascus in 1970, followed by the Arab Committee Meeting in 1976. When the Arab Socialist Ba'ath Party banned all youth organizations in the 1980s, the association lost its international recognition. Guiding was restarted in 2000 after the election of Bashar al-Assad as president of Syria. In July 2008, the Guide branch of Scouts of Syria was re-admitted to associate membership of WAGGGS. It was promoted to full membership in 2017.

== Membership ==
The association is open to members of all faiths and of both genders. Many events and most leadership training are carried out jointly, however most local units are single-sex.

The Scout branch of Scouts of Syria had 9,358 members in 2008 (1,170 Cub Scouts, 4,500 Scouts, 3,000 Advanced Scouts, 250 Rovers and 438 Adult Leaders). The Guide branch numbered 1,020 members.

In 1959, during the period when the Boy Scouts de Syrie was recognized as a unified Scout federation with Egypt, the Levantine nation had 17,900 Scouts, and in 1990 membership stood at 11,073.

== Program ==
=== Sections ===
The association is divided in four sections according to age:

- Cub Scouts/Brownie Guides - ages 7 to 11
- Scouts/Guides - ages 12 to 14
- Advanced Scouts/Senior Guides - ages 15 to 17
- Rover Scouts/Ranger Guides - ages 18 to 23.

=== Motto ===
The Scout Motto is Kun Musta'idan (كن مستعداً), translating as Be Prepared, but the local variant is Wa-a-iddoo (و أعدوا). The noun for a single Scout is Kashaf (كشاف).

=== Facilities ===
Syrian Scouts have a national training center at Zabadani, where the first Arab Jamboree was held in 1954.
