= List of Syrian artists =

This is a list of Syrian artists, artists from Syria, or of Syrian descent.

== A ==
- Youssef Abdelke (born 1951), draughtsman and printmaker
- Aula Al Ayoubi (born 1973), painter and collagist
- Bengin Ahmad (born 1986), Syrian-Kurdish photographer
- Darin Ahmad (born 1979), artist, poet and writer
- Manal Ajaj (born 1978), fashion designer
- Khaled Akil (born 2000), Syrian-born Turkish multidisciplinary visual artist and photographer
- Krayem Awad (born 1948), Vienna-based painter, sculptor and poet, of Syrian origin

== B ==
- Khaled Barakeh (born 1976), multidisciplinary artist
- Riad Beyrouti (1944–2019), painter

== F ==
- Salwa Fallouh (1920–2008), painter and illustrator
- Ali Farzat (born 1951), political cartoonist

== G ==
- Nihad Gule (born 1968), painter

== H ==
- Omar Hamdi (1951–2015), Syrian Kurdish painter and designer, based in Vienna
- Mahmoud Hammad (1923–1988), painter, pioneer of modern Syrian art
- Wahbi al-Hariri (1914–1994), Syrian American sculptor, painter and architect

== J ==
- Nazem al-Jaafari (1918–2015), painter, pioneer of impressionism in Syria

== K ==
- Iqbal Naji Karesly (1925–1969), painter
- Mamdouh Kashlan (born 1929), painter
- Marwan Kassab-Bachi (1934–2016), German-Syrian painter
- Louay Kayali (1934–1978), modern painter and draughtsman
- Khaled al-Khani (born 1975), painter

== M ==
- Ahmad Madoun (1941–1983), painter
- Fateh Moudarres (1922–1999), painter, leader of the modern art movement in Syria

== N ==
- Nazir Nabaa (1938–2016), painter

== S ==
- Khairat Al-Saleh (born 1940), multidisciplinary artist, part of the Hurufiyya movement; born in Jerusalem, resident in Britain
- Kais Salman (born 1976), painter
- Mamoun Sakkal (born 1950), calligrapher
- Houmam Al Sayed (born 1981)
- Jason Seife (born 1989), American painter and sculptor, of Syrian and Cuban descent
- Mouneer Al-Shaarani (born 1952), calligraphic artist
- Sara Shamma (born 1975), painter and sculptor

== Y ==
- Hala Al-Abdallah Yacoub (born 1956), cinematographer and filmmaker

== See also ==
- List of Syrians
