= Bengrina =

Bengrina is a surname. Notable people with the surname include:

- Abdelkader Bengrina (born 1962), Algerian politician;
- Mohamed Bengrina (born 1996), Algerian footballer.

== See also ==
- Bengin Ahmad
