= Syrian cultural caravan =

Syria-based cultural movement

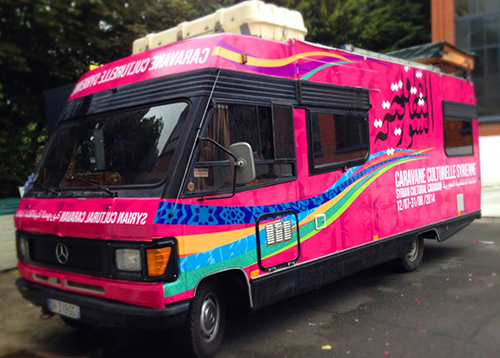
Cultural Caravan's pink van, symbol of the movement.

The Syrian Cultural Caravan is an artistic and cultural movement led by Syrian artists. Started in 2014 as a project called "Freedom for the Syrian People", it took the form of a road trip, taking off from France and continuing across Europe. In face of the success met in 2014, the project became a movement entitled the "Syrian Cultural Caravan".

The project aims at bringing a wide diversity of artists together around a multi-format exhibition mixing paintings, photographs, dance, music, film screenings, as well as debates and the sharing of food. The goal of the project is "to promote Syrian civil society and contemporary Syrian art and culture" by debunking the public's expectations. Artists create a platform for debate on which they can offer their own narrative to counterweight the mainstream narrative of the media.

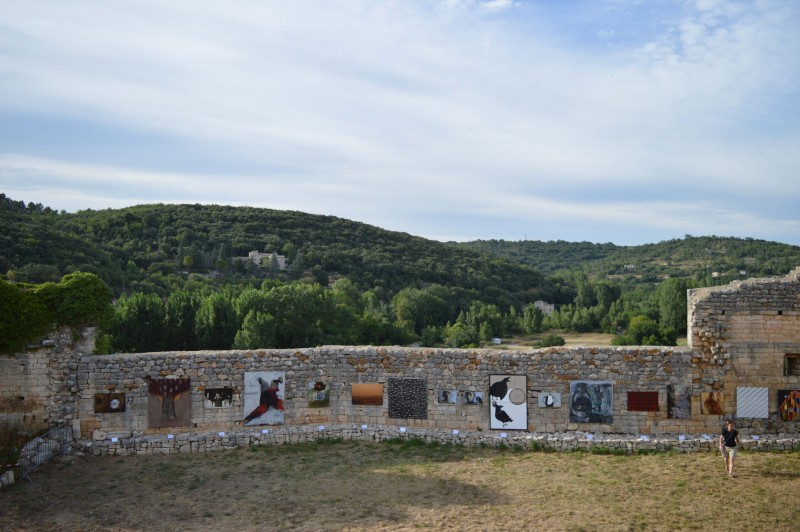
Exhibition in Montclus - Le Gard Region - July 30, 2015

== Route ==
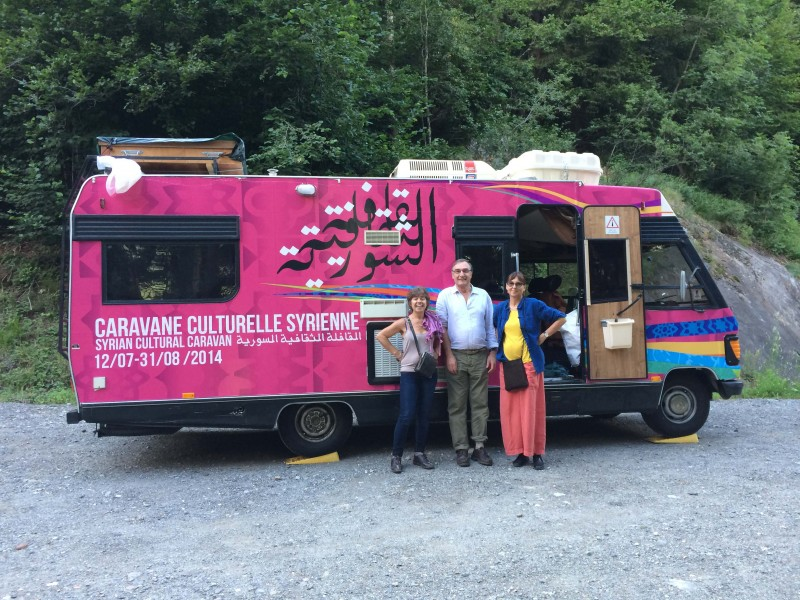
Caravan hitting the road, short stop in Les Houches, Chamonix Valley, July 21, 2014.

The Syrian cultural caravan started its road trip in 2014, on July 12, in Paris. It drove to the South of France, and then to Italy, Germany and ended up in Brussels on September 28, 2014. With 14 different stops and more than 6,500 km, the project encountered great success, thus encouraging the artists to make another road trip in 2015, travelling another 10,000 km and performing in another 11 places. The cultural caravan also has events planned for the summer 2016.

=== 2014 ===
The cultural caravan started its adventure on July 12, 2014. To celebrate the departure, it had organised a performance, eventually cancelled due to the weather, in la Cartoucherie de Vincennes, in front of the Théâtre du Soleil. Its first stops were in the Gard Region, where it performed in 9 different towns:

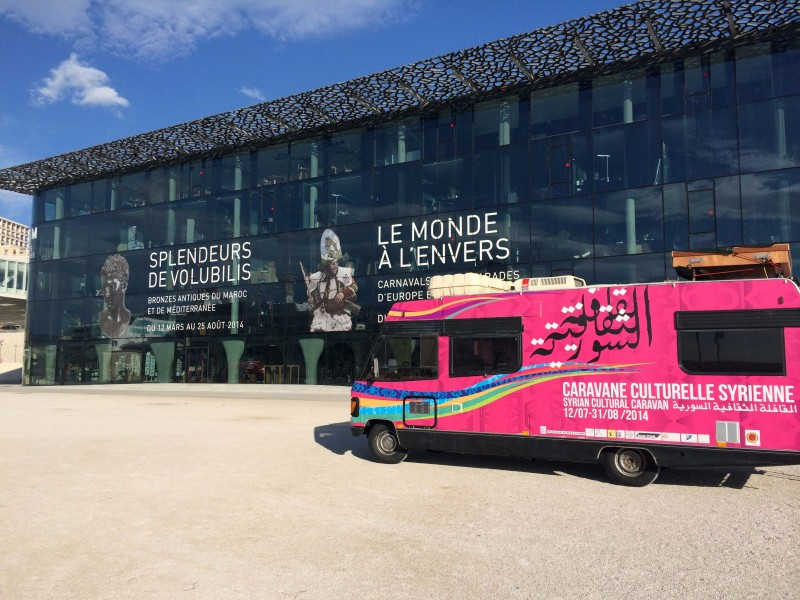
Caravan in the Mucem, Marseille, July 21, 2014.

- Fons-sur-Lussans, July 15, 2014.
- Lussan, July 16, 2014.
- La Lèque, July 17, 2014.
- Mèze, July 18, 2014.
- Avignon, July 19, 2014.
- Mucem in Marseille, July 21 and 22 2014.
- Bonnieux, July 23, 2014.
- Saint-Amant-Roche-Savine, July 25, 2014 for the Belle Rouge festival,
- Lyon July 26 to 28 2014.

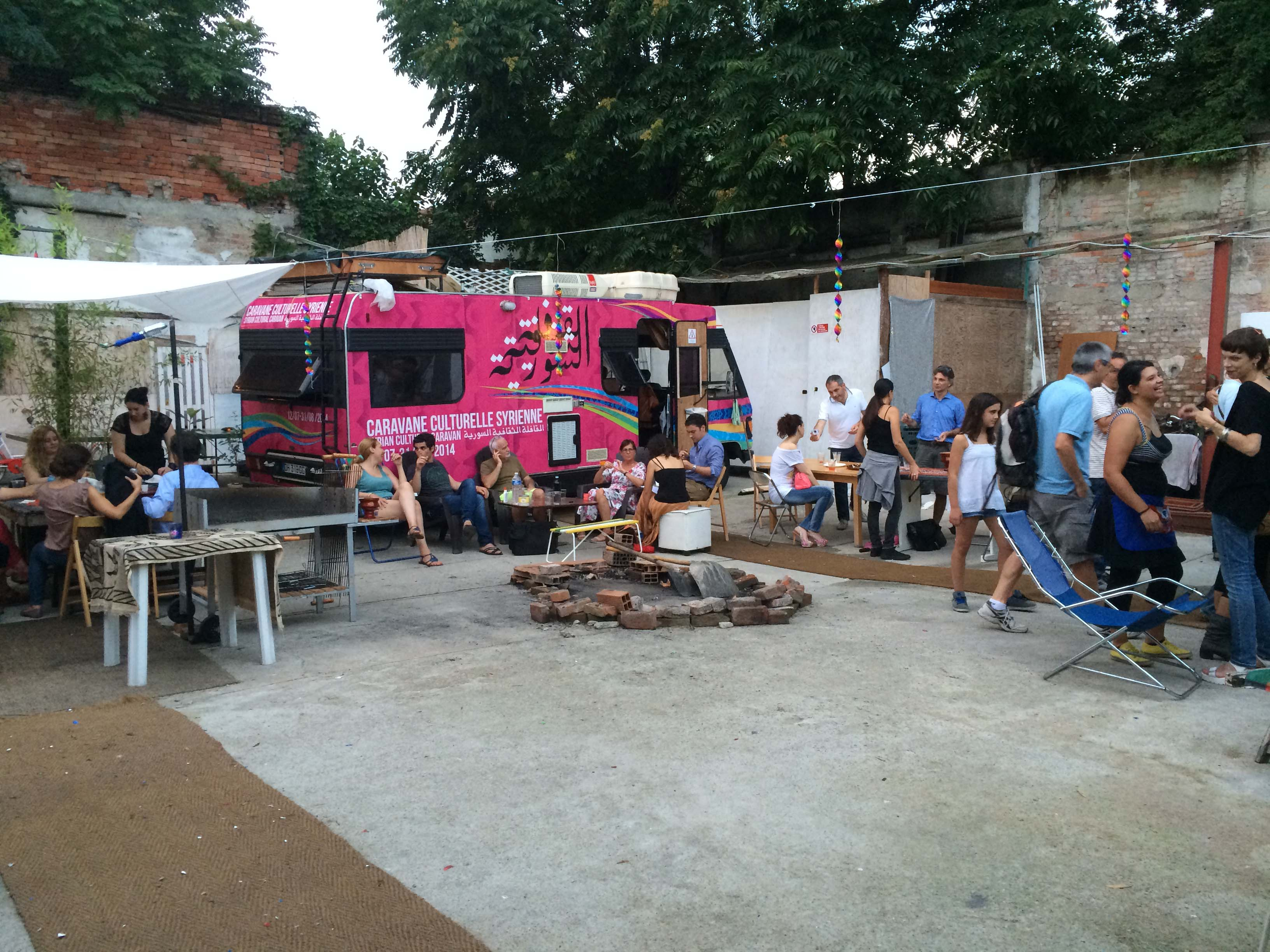
Caravan crossing borders to Italy. Cascine Martesana, Milan, August 2, 2014.

Then the Cultural Caravan crossed European borders to Italy and Germany:

- Milan, August 2, 2014.
- Berlin, August 7, 2014.

It came back to the North-East of France and stopped in two cities:

- Strasbourg, August 22 to 23 2014
- Metz, August 25 and 26 2014.

The tour ended in Brussels Fine Arts Centre on September 28.

Finally, the caravan came back to Paris and participated in the Bastille Quartier Libre festive on October 11. On the whole, it travelled across four countries, organised 17 events in 14 different cities and villages, including 15 exhibitions, three poetry recitals, five drama recitals, three conferences, nine film screenings, and two dance performances.

=== 2015 ===
In face of the great success met during the tour of summer 2014, the Syrian Cultural Caravan reorganised a road trip for spring and summer 2015, based this time on the various invitations to perform they had received from cities and art centres. In the spring, it travelled to northern Europe.

- Bergen, Norway, May 29 to 31 2015. Artists performed for the Bergen International Festival, an event mixing music and culture. They had been invited by the Knipsu. The event was supported by Bergen City and the Freedom of Speech Foundation in Oslo.
- Pulheim, Germany, June 4 to 7 2015. It performed for the Fair of Contemporary Art organised by Art' Pu:l.
- Bochum, Germany, June 9, 2015, on the invitation of the organisation Ifak.

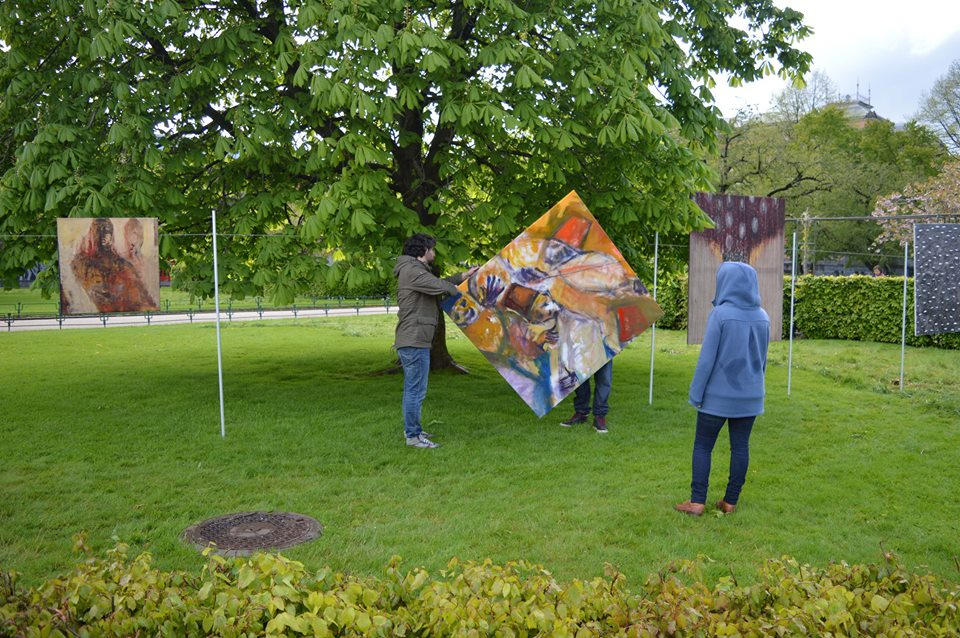
Caravan in Bergen, Norway, invited by the KNIPSU. Exhibition in the park, May 29, 2015.

In summer 2015, the Caravan started its summer road trip in Paris at Le Point Éphémère on July 18. They performed again in the Parisian cultural alternative centre on July 19, and then took off for the Gard Region:

- Ales, July 23, 2015.
- Uzès, July 26, 2015.
- Montclus, July 30, 2015.
- La Lèque, August 6, 2015.
- La Roche Canilhac, August 8, 2015.
- Saint-Julien-les-Rosiers and Barjac, October 16 and 17 2015.

In September, it crossed the border again to go to Barcelona.

== Plurality of formats ==
The Syrian cultural caravan presents a polymorphous exhibition, which mobilizes different media, in a variety of exhibiting places, and includes artists of diverse backgrounds.

A wide diversity of media are used by the Syrian Cultural Caravan. This includes visual arts, such as paintings and photographs. But the exhibition also comprises dance and music performances, poems, and film screenings. Debates are an important part of the exhibition, as well as a meal prepared by the Caravan and shared with the public.

The Syrian cultural caravan reaches out to various different artists to create this multi-format exhibition. It brings together painters, photographers, as well as actors, film-makers, writers, poets, and musicians. The artists themselves act as technical staff and set up the exhibition. They also manage the contact with the media and are present during the whole day of the exhibition to explain and answer the public's questions.

Finally, the caravan performs in very heterogeneous places. Not only does it exhibit in many different European countries, it also goes as much to major cities – such as Paris, Berlin or Brussels – as to small towns of the Gard region. In each of these sites, the exhibition can happen inside – in the Mucem for example – but also in the streets, or in a park – as in Bergen.

== Participants ==
A total of 30 artists are involved in the project. However, they are not all present all the time. Some of them come for specific stops only. Mohamad al Roumi is the main organizer of the project. Five artists work alongside him to carry out the movement: Amélie Duhamel, Florence Aubin, Khlouloud Al Zghayare, Walaa Dakak and Walid El Masri. The Syrian cultural caravan aims to create ties with the places they go to by collaborating with local artists. Therefore, numerous local artists also contribute to the project.

=== Curator ===
Razan Nassreddine: She was born in a Syrian-Lebanese family. She graduated in French literature from University of Damascus, as well as in Inter-Mediterranean Mediation from Universities of Montpellier III, France, UAB in Barcelona, and Ca'Foscari, in Venice. She is a scholar and curator. She was artistic advisor for the Cultural Diary of Damascus and the curator of Syrian film screenings in the Berlin exhibition KunstStoff Syrien 2014.

=== Dance ===
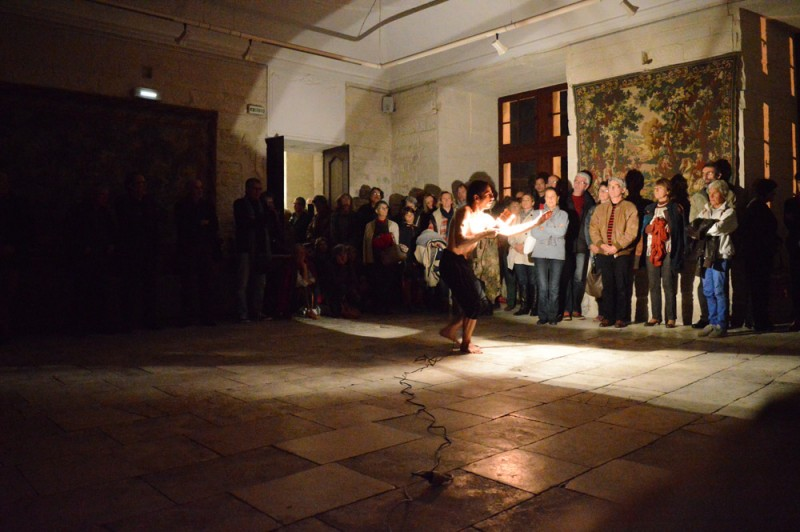
Eyas Al Mokdad's dance performance - Saint-Julien-les-Rosiers - October 16, 2015

Eyas Al Mokdad: He was born in Syria, where he graduated from the ballet school of Damascus Higher Institute of Dramatic Art. He also graduated from a master in multimedia at Brussels' Luca School of Art, Belgium. He is a choreographer and a dancer and he also makes movies such as The Last Time (2006), Bloodshed (2012) or The Other Half of your Shadow (2013).

Mey Seifan: She is a choreographer trained in 1987 in Damascus' first ballet school. She kept on studying in the Superior Institute of Dramatic Arts in Frankfurt. She lives in Munich, Germany, and works as a dancer and dance teacher between Germany and Syria. She choreographed the project "Consequences" and founded the Damascus Contemporary Dance Platform and the Tanween Company. Her main topic of interest are the dreams of Syrians immersed in the conflict.

Rami Hassoun: He was born in 1989. He is both a dancer and a choreographer and mixes capoeïra, hip-hop and contemporary dance. In 2010, he performs his solo work Ligne Blanche at the festival Bruits de la passion.

=== Film-making ===
Ammar Al Beik: Filmmaker & Visual Artist. He was born in 1972 in Damascus. He makes docu-fiction, has contributed to exhibitions and programs worldwide for nearly two decades, most recently at Fondazione Giorgio Cini, Venice (2015); Museum of Modern and Contemporary Art, Seoul (2015); FotoFest Biennial, USA (2014); Samsung Blue Square and the Busan Museum of Art, South Korea (2014); and Palais de Tokyo, Paris (2012). His works are housed in private and public collections such as the Centre Pompidou; Los Angeles County Museum of Art; and Museum of Modern Art, New York. Al-Beik's films have screened at the Museum of Modern Art, New York; Berlin International Film Festival (Berlinale); International Film Festival Rotterdam (IFFR); Yamagata International Documentary Film Festival (YIDFF); Cinéma du Réel, International Documentary Film Festival (IDFA); São Paul International Film Festival (MOSTRA); Singapore International Film Festival (SGIFF); Copenhagen International Documentary Film Festival (CPH:DOX); Locarno International Film Festival; among other venues. He now lives and works in Berlin.

Darina Al Joundi: Actress. She was born in Beirut, Lebanon, in 1968 and started her career at 8 years old. She is also a playwright for drama and television.

Meyar al Roumi: He was born in 1973 in Damascus, where he studied fine arts. He also studied in Paris VIII and graduated from Femis. He has directed documentaries including A silent film in 2001, Waiting for the day in 2004, and The Club of the Future in 2006. He has also directed fiction: the short movie The Voyage of Rabia in 2006 and the long-movie Round trip in 2012.

Mohamad al Roumi: he was born in 1945 in Aleppo, Syria, and graduated in fine arts in 1972 in Damascus. He worked first as a painter before turning to photography. He directed in 2012 a documentary, Blue-Grey.

=== Music ===
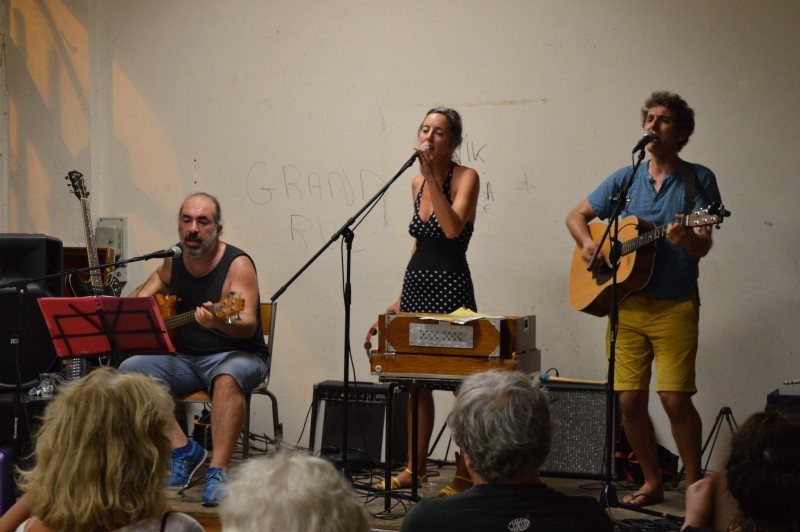
Catherine & Vincent's concert, accompanied by Mohammad Al Arachi - Alès - July 23, 2015

Catherine Estrade & Vincent Commaret: They form a music duo who write, compose and perform folk songs. They lived for four years in Damascus and are now living in Marseille, France, since 2004.

Hassan Taha: He was born in 1968 in Homs, Syria. He is a self-taught musician. He studied horn and Oud instruments at Damascus Higher institute of Music, as well as composition in the Conservatory of Maastricht and completed his master in Bern, Switzerland, where he low lives. He performed in Switzerland, Germany, as well as Syria, Lebanon and Tunisia.

Khaled al Jaramani: He was born in 1972 in Syria. He studied oud with Professor Faye Zher Eddine, Munir Bashir and Nasser Chema. He also studied in the Higher Institute for Music in Damascus and performed with the Syrian National Symphony Orchestra, the Arab Music Orchestra, as well as soloist in the Institut du Monde Arabe in Paris in 2011.

Mohanad Aljaramani: He was born in 1979 in Sweida, Syria. He graduated from the Higher Institute for Music in Damascus in 2008. He co-founded the trio "Bab Assalam" with Raphaël Vuillard and Khaled al Jaramani in Aleppo in 2007. He performed with the National Conservatory and with the Damascus Opera from 2005 to 2011.

Naïssam Jalal: She was born in Paris in a Syrian family. She studied classical flute since she was 6 and graduated from the Commission française pour l'enseignement des mathématiques. She kept on studying the nay (traditional Middle-Eastern flute) at Damascus Institute of Arabic Music. She worked in Cairo with the master violinist Abdo Dagher and played with Egyptian and African musicians. She also plays jazz.

=== Painting ===
Ahmad Kaddour: Born in Syria, he studied in the Damascus University Faculty of Fine Arts and graduated in 1985. He also studied in École nationale supérieure des Beaux-Arts based in Paris. His media are diverse, encompassing painting, drawing, video and screen-printing. Beyond this artistic creations, he has also published two books: Seattle in 1994 and Quleques heures, quelques hivers in 1998. He has taught workshops in Paris since 2008.

Akram Al Halabi: He was born in Majdal Shams in 1980. He studied visual art techniques at the art house of Bait al Fan between 1997 and 2000. His teacher was Wael Tabard. He also studied in Ammam, Jordan, in Damascus, Syria, as well as in Vienna, Austria, and Sweden. He is a founding member and volunteer at Fatheh Mudarris Center of Arts.

Ali Kaaf: He was born of Syrian parents in Oran, Algeria, in 1977. He studied art both at Beirut Faculty of Fine Arts in Lebanon, and Berlin University of Arts in Germany. He uses several materials including videos, photographies as well as glass and paper to explore themes of erosion and resistance. He won in 2001 several awards: the Young Collector's at the Rome MAXXI Museum, the DAAD-Preis UdK, the AIR Honor Award from Berkeley's KAL.

Amjad Wardeh: He was born in 1984 and studied at the Faculty of Fine Arts in Damascus. Amjad worked in several organisations. He was in charge of the animation for the Syrian national broadcasting company. He was also artistic director for the newspaper Baladna. Finally, he was assistant professor at Damascus Faculty of Fine Arts.

Bahram Hajou: He was born in 1952 in Syria. He studied in Düsseldorf Academy of Fine Arts and still now lives in Germany. His work focuses on human solitude as well as German Expressionism.

Bernard Gortais: Painter and multimedia artist. He participated to several exhibitions based in France, from Galerie 14 in Toucy, France, to Gazibul Theatre Company in 2013 and finally Galerie Keller in Paris in 2014.

Ernest Pignon-Ernest: Pioneer of French urban art, he was born in Nice in 1942. His main media are paintings stuck on buildings, black chalk drawings, and serigraphs. He is very politically involved, from his art series to the artist organisation "Artists of the world against apartheid" he founded with Antonio Saura and Jacques Derrida in 1974.

Iman Hasbani: She graduated in oil painting at Damascus School of Fine Arts in 2004 and has received several awards worldwide, notably Canada's 2003 Biennal first prize for small works.

Khaled al-Khani: He was born in 1975 in Hama, Syria, before coming to France. He studies fine arts and oil painting. He became a member of the Artists' Union in Damascus in 1998. He exhibited in the Cité internationale des arts in Paris, and also worked in the Kiel museum, Germany, in 2013. His central theme is freedom.

Khaled Takreti: He was born in 1964 in Beyrouth. he studied architecture in Damas' University. he started exhibiting his art work in the 1990s and was influenced by pop art.

Monif Ajaj: He was born in 1968 in Deir ez-zor, Syria. He graduated in 1995 from Minsk Belarus Academy of Fine Arts and is now a teacher at Damascus Faculty of Fine Arts. He is also an illustrator of children's books. he won in 2006 the first prize for Young Syrian artist of the year.

Shada Safadi: She was born in 1982 in Majdal Shams and graduated from Damascus Faculty of Fine Arts in 2005. She founded the Center for the Arts and Culture Fateh al Mudarris in her hometown.

Tammam Azzam: He was born in 1980 and graduated from Damascus Faculty of Fine Arts. He later joined the Al Kharif Academy working under Professor Marwan Kassab Bashi. He participated to several exhibitions including Rusha Arts in New York in 2014, FotoFest Biennal in Houston in 2014, Ayyam Gallery in London in 2013, Ayyam Gallery Al Quoz in Dubai in 2012. His work 'Graffiti Freedom' became very popular on social media platforms.

Wahid el Masri: he was born in 1979 and graduated in 2005 from Damascus Faculty of Fine Arts. He works with the Ayyam Gallery since 2007. he participated to several exhibitions including the Art Beijing contemporary art Fair in 009, the Samsung Blue Square in Seoul in 2014 and in l'Institut du Monte Arabe in 2014.

Walaa Dakak: He was born in 1978, and is a mast graduate in Fine Arts from the University of Damascus. He moved to Paris in 2004 and is now teaching art workshops, along his artistic projects.

Yaser Safi: He was born in 1976 in Qamishli, Syria, and graduated in 1997 from Damascus Faculty of Fine Arts, as well as in graphic design in 1999. He has taught graphic design in Damascus and Sharjah United Arab Emirates. He participated in 2010 in the Tripoli-Leipzig cooperation workshop. He also received several awards, including the Prize of Latakieh Biennal in 2001 and the Prix d'Honneur of Damascus Cervantes Institute in 2000.

=== Photography ===
Ammar Abd Rabbo: He was born in 1966 in Damascus and has lived in Livya and Lebanon before coming to live in France. He graduated from Sciences Po Paris and has been working since 1992 in news agencies. His photographs are published in Newspapers, such as Le Monde, Time, Der Spiegel.

Dino Ahmad Ali: He was born in Syria and graduated in 2007 from Damascus Faculty of Fine Arts. Now living in France, he uses various media including video, photography, and optical art.

Firas Jabakhanji: He studied painting at the School of Fine Arts while working as a photographer in a studio and for television series. His work is influenced by Eastern music and dwells with the topics of movement, mobility, immobility.

Jaber Al Azmeh: He was born in 1973 in Damascus and graduated in visual communications at the University of Damascus. He was a photography teacher at the IUST University in 2006 and now lives in Doha, Qatar. His work includes the photographs, popular on social media platforms, of the popular Syrian Newspaper Al Baath with one-word comment.

Muzaffar Salman: He was born in 1976 in Homs. He works for Associated Press agency and covers Syrian news since the beginning of the conflict. His photographs express poetry and hope even in the utmost despair. He also has an exhibition Alep, année zéro at the Institut des cultures d'Islam.

=== Sculpture ===
Assem al Bacha: He was born of a Syrian father in 1948 in Buenos Aires. He is a member of Damascus Society of Friends of Art since the 1960s.

Clio Makris: She was born in Budapest in 1955. She studied in École normale supérieure des Beaux-Arts in Paris and graduated in 1980. Her main themes are memory and roots. She also work as a therapist using art in psychiatric hospitals.

Florence Aubin: (painter and sculptor): Born in Aleppo, she has been working in the South of France and exhibited in France, Italy and Tunisia. She is a self-taught artist.

Mohamad Omran: he was born in 1979 in Syria and graduated from Damascus Faculty of Fine Arts. He also graduated in 2009 in history of the contemporary art from Université Lyon 2, where he now lives. In 2003, he received the Grand Prize of the biennale Al Mahaba in Latakia, Syria. He dwells with the topic of Syrian revolution with irony and sarcasm to "reveal senselessness".

=== Writing ===
Golan Haji: He was born in Amouda, Syria, and then moved to France. He is an English-Arabic translator and has also published poetry, such as "in Darkness" in 2004.

Khaled Soliman Nassiry: He was born in 1979 in Damascus, Syria, and moved to Milan in 2009. He published books, including Sadaqtu Kulla Shai in 2009 and Selected Poems Syria, Italy, Sweden in 2011. He is the editor of the Italian-Arabic magazine "Aljarida"'s Arabic version. He is also a filmmaker.

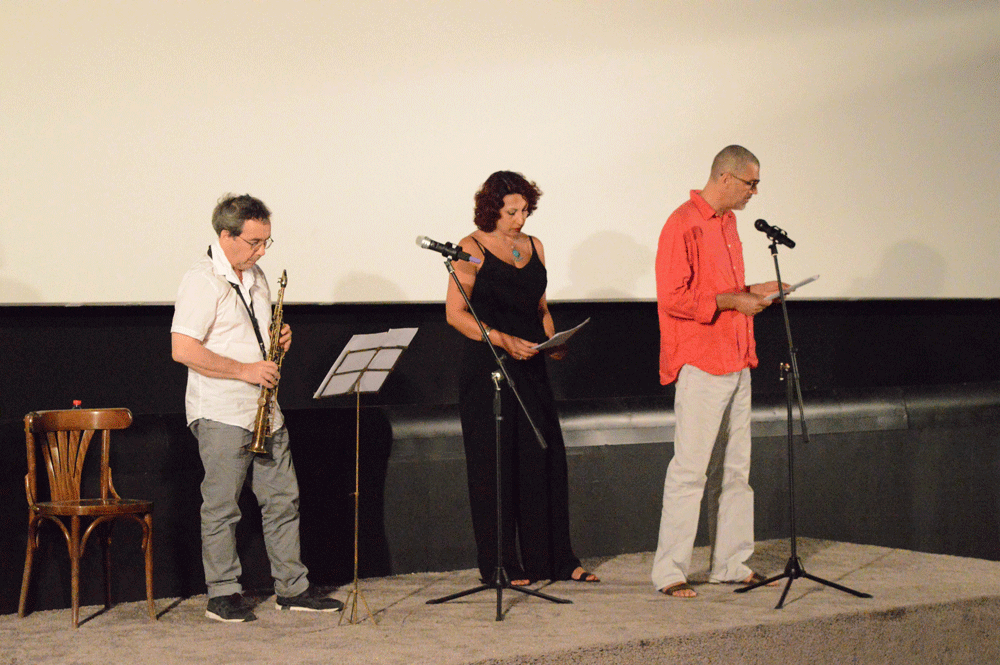
Khouloud al Zghayare's poem recital - Uzès - July 26, 2015

Khouloud al Zghayare: she graduated in sociology at Damascus University, and is now a sociology PhD student in Paris 3. She published a series of articles and research in Arab newspapers, research centres, and websites. She also write poetry, published by Dar ALTAKOUIN in 2007 in Damascus and in 2010 in Beirut.

Samar Yazbek: She was born in 1970, and comes from Jablé, Syria. She published four novels in Syria, as well as the testimony A Woman in the Crossfire published in 2012 in Haus Publishing about the first months of the Syrian Revolution. She lives in Paris since 2011 and is a very active blog-writer.

== Objectives ==
By promoting a better understanding of Syrian art, culture and society, the Cultural Caravan aims to debunk expectations of Syria and to offer an alternative narrative to the mainstream media narrative. The objective is two-fold: political and cultural.

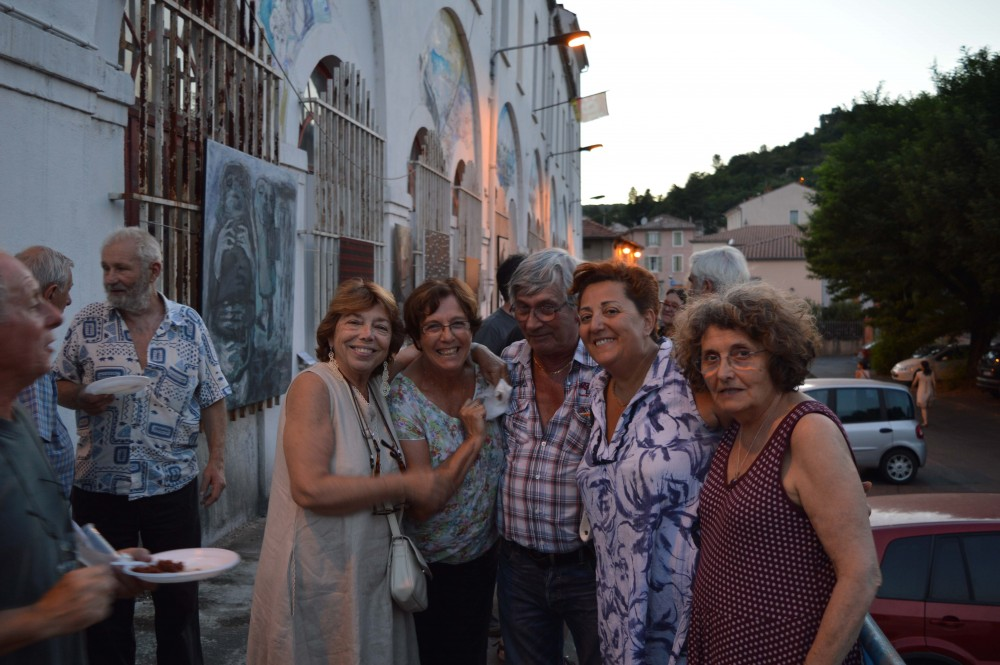
Caravan in Alès - exhibition attended by Leila Shahid – July 23, 2015

The Syrian Cultural Caravan has the political aim to re-establish the complexity of the Syrian conflict. It provides the public with another narrative, counterweighting the simplified stories of bombings, attacks and terrorism found in the media. The work of artists is, according to Leila Shahid in La Marseilleise, a universal language to express the Syrian people's suffering. It gives the opportunity for artists of the caravan to contribute in their own way to raise awareness and engage the public, while at the same time reflecting on what kind of change art can bring. They do not wish to offer a blueprint, unidimensional solution to the conflict but rather they open up the space for dialogue by creating a platform of exchange.

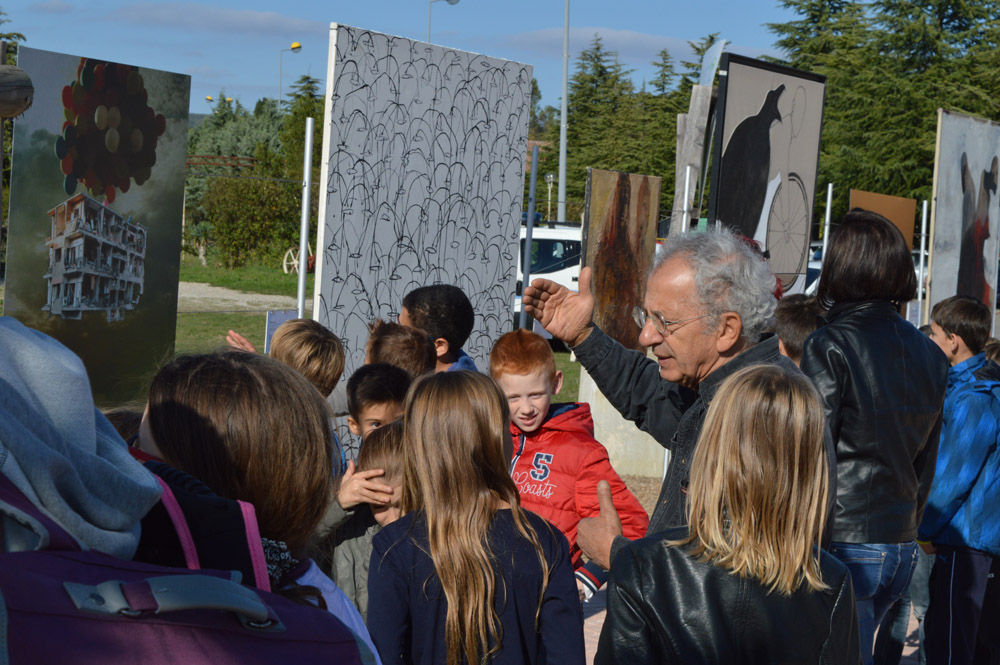
Caravan's exhibition - Barjac, October 17, 2015 - Attended by many children

The objective is also cultural. The movement aims to bring a new look on Syria by focusing on its cultural diversity and richness, beyond ubiquitous images of despair. According to Leila Shahid for La Marseilleise, Syria is a great cultural nation, a pluricultural leader of artistic creation. Journalist Alain Laurens commented that the Syrian cultural caravan's involvement makes the public forget during the performance about all the bombings in Aleppo and Damascus and make room for a humane and fraternal communion. It is a way of showing that the Syrian cultural scene and its artists is alive and thriving. Finally, the road trip allows the Cultural Caravan to make art and culture come to the people, therefore going upstream of artistic and cultural centralisation. Most of the time, the exhibition is set up outside, making it accessible to a greater number.

== Reception ==
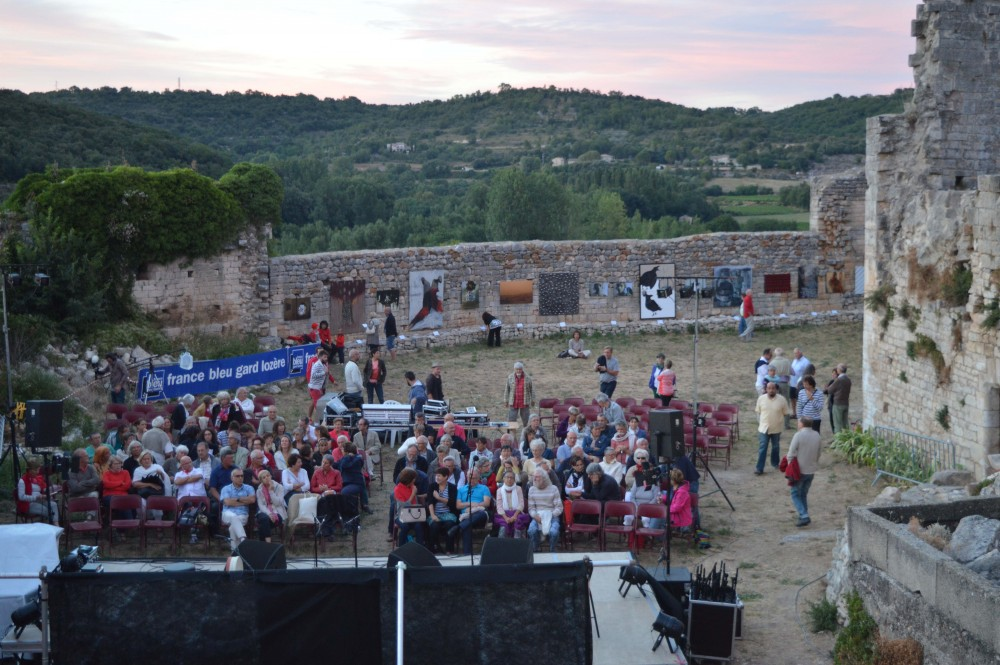
Caravan's exhibition in Montclus - July 30, 2015

Since its initiation in 2014, the caravan has generally been viewed favourably. Newspapers describe the public as being a curious, impressed and welcoming in response to the caravan. Artists have created debates, opening up the space for discussion among participants and the public.

This success translated into a series of invitations by numerous municipalities to come and perform in 2015. The number of invitations for 2016 has increased.

The caravan has also succeeded in raising awareness and mobilising European political figures around solidarity with the Syrian people. Its performance in Metz, France, was inscribed with the declaration of Metz' mayor, Dominique Gros, to develop its civil partnership with the city of Aleppo. In Germany, Frank Keppeler, Pulheim's mayor, and Myriam Koch, Düsseldorf's deputy mayor, have stated their will to increase and improve their accommodation capacity towards Syrian refugees. They also organised in Alès a performance in partnership with the CGT, a major French labor Union. Leila Shahid, PLO's former spokeswoman in Paris and former General Delegate of Palestine in Brussels, along with Yves Aubin de la Messuzière came to express their support for the cultural caravan.

== Association ==
On October 25, 2014, the Syrian Cultural Caravan decided to turn the project into an association under French law 1901. Its headquarters are at 36 rue Keller, 75011 Paris. The association is constituted of honorary members, benefactor members, and active members. The board is composed of the president, Mohamad al Roumi, the treasurer, Ahmad Kaddour and the general secretary, Walid El Masri.

== Funding ==
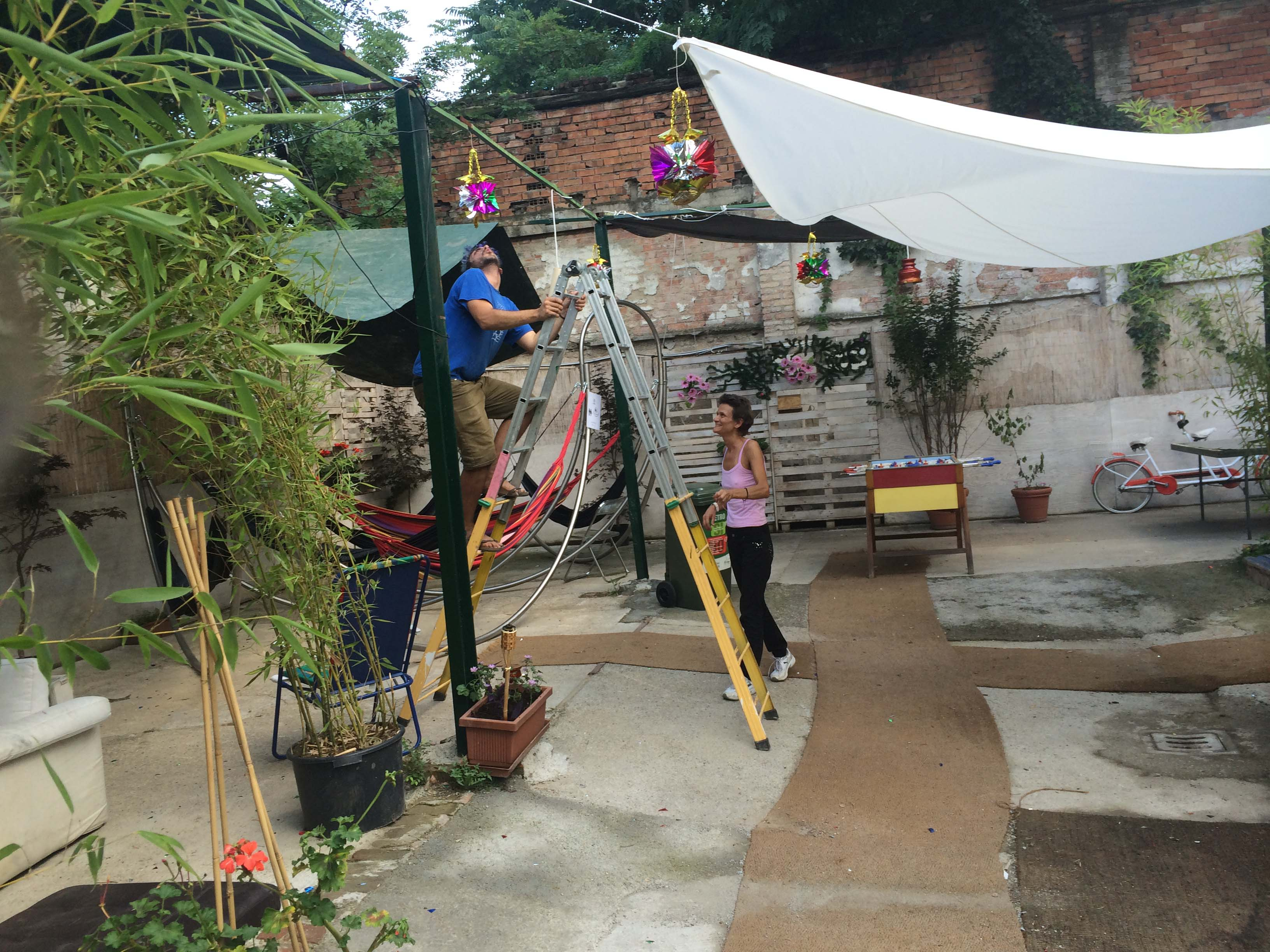
Artists and helpers setting up the exhibition - Milan - August 2, 2014

On its initiation, the project was self-financed. Participating artists paid a subscription, making it possible to fund the caravan and the journey costs. Donations organised by the caravan's network also accounted for a big part of the budget. Families and friends of the caravan's members played an important role by hosting the participants and contributing to the expenses of the trip. The caravan's success in 2014 allowed it to develop partnerships with various organisations.

Its official partners are now Point Éphèmère, Mucem, Festival d'Avignon, ccfd-terre solidaire – which supplied € 5000, Syrie MDL -, Association Alsace-Syrie, Collectif du développement et du secours syrien (CODSSY); Souri Houria, cascina martesana, Kultur Vertretung, New Morning, Vague Blanche pour la Syrie, Comsyr Moselle, Comité de secours à la population syrienne, and SyriArt. 2015's budget was therefore composed of € 5000 subsidised by the ccfd-terre solitaire organisation, € 2336 from personal subscriptions and donations, and € 6928 from fund-collection.

== See also ==
- Website: http://caravaneculturellesyrienne.org/wp-content/uploads/2014/12/DossierPresse-English.pdf
- Press Pack: http://caravaneculturellesyrienne.org/wp-content/uploads/2014/12/DossierPresse-English.pdf
- Blog Le Monde: http://caravanesyrienne.blog.lemonde.fr/
- Project and press articles: "La caravane culturelle syrienne | Souria Houria – Syrie Liberté – سوريا حرية". souriahouria.com. 30 June 2014.
