= Radical love =

Radical love may refer to:

- Radical Love (album), a 2014 album by Filipino group Victory Worship
- Radical love (social psychology), a theory based on the works of Jesús Gómez Alonso
- Radical Love, a 2017 series of 3D prints by bio-artist Heather Dewey-Hagborg
- Radical Love, a company launched by Australian filmmaker Jarod Green
- “Radical Love”, a 2012 single and music video by American duo Danielle and Jennifer
- Radical Love:5 Novels, a 2006 book by American writer Fanny Howe
- Radical Love: Female Lust, a 2017 art exhibit in London including work by Syrian artist Aula Al Ayoubi
