= Salwa Fallouh =

Syrian painter and illustrator (1920–2008)

- سلمى فلوح
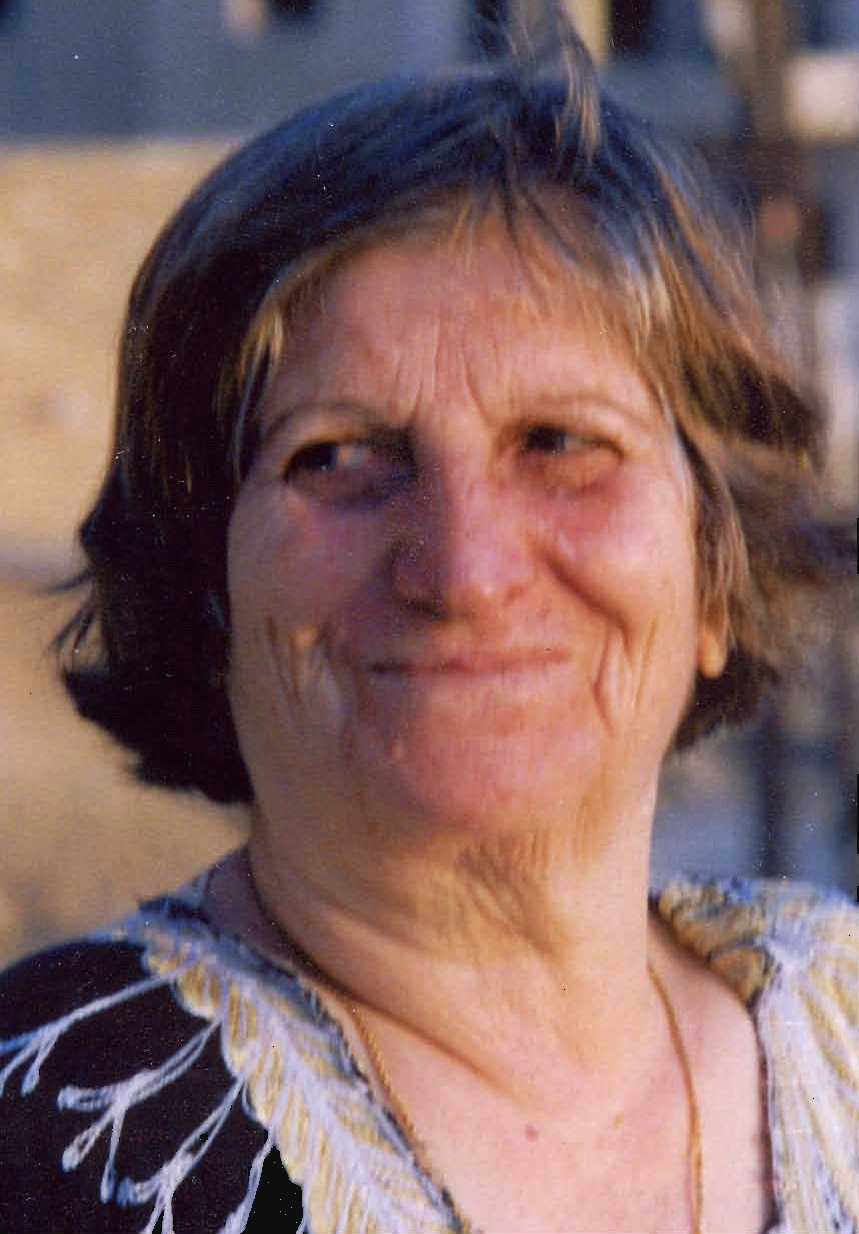
- Born: 1920; Bassir, Hauran, Kingdom of Syria
- Died: 26 December 2008 (aged 87–88); Syria
- Other names: Salwa Falouh Al-Salem; Salma Fallouh Al-Salem
- Occupation: Artist
- Years active: 2000–2008
- Known for: Painting

Salwa Fallouh (Arabic: سلمى فلوح; 1920 – December 26, 2008), was a Syrian painter and illustrator. She started painting professionally at the age of 80, and left a legacy of thousands of paintings.

== Biography ==
Salwa Fallouh was born in 1920 in the village of Bassir in Hauran, Kingdom of Syria (now Syria). She married at the age of 20 to Hani Al-Salem, and together they had 9 children.

When her children were raised, she began exploring the process of making art. Her work was primarily impressionist landscapes, animals, and still life paintings. Carlos Barona Narbione, of the Cervantes Center in Damascus wrote about her after her first art exhibition: “These are the birds, trees, deer, suns, and flowers that Salwa saw in her childhood,”

She died on December 26, 2008, in Syria.

== See also ==
- List of Syrian artists
