= Ammar Al-Beik =

Syrian filmmaker (born 1972)

- عمّار البيك
- Born: December 17, 1972 (age 53); Damascus, Syria
- Known for: Filmmaking,
- Website: www.ammaralbeik.io

Ammar al-Beik (born on December 17, 1972), is a Syrian filmmaker and contemporary visual artist.

== Career ==
Al-Beik was born and grew up in Damascus, Syria, from where he has been exiled since 2011.

Al-Beik's artistic career stems from unconventional roots. His love for photography intensified after leaving the University of Damascus where he was pursuing a degree in business administration in order to work at a camera repair shop for ten years during the 1990s. It is there where he received his formal training in the medium, exploring various methods and approaches while becoming an expert in photographic equipment. He has been exhibiting his photographs since the mid-1990s, at a time when he simultaneously began an impressive career in filmmaking. Taking his cinematic works to the international stage, he has earned critical acclaim from audiences and juries across the globe and has been honored with a number of distinctions and awards.

His choice for cinema was a choice of life, a choice of rebellion through the reality of its political, social and artistic means. al-Beik's early cinematic works, such as “Light Harvest” (1997) and “They Were Here” (2000), provide evidence of his strong foundation in photography, as nearly each scene results in the perfect still, acting fundamentally as a sequence of images.

Having participated in screenings worldwide since 1999, his films have been featured at such events as the Venice, Rotterdam, São Paulo, Oberhausen, Locarno, Nantes and Yamagata International Film Festivals.

His invitation to the 63rd Annual Venice Film Festival - Official Selection (2006), was a first in the history of Syrian cinema, where he received the Provincia Autonoma di Trento Doc/It- Award for his film “I Am the One Who Brings Flowers to Her Grave”. Since then, this film has been touring the world to be screened in the most prestigious film festivals and events including Berlin, Locarno, Rotterdam, the MoMA and the Centre Pompidou.

Among other awards, al-Beik won The Liege Mayor Award at the 7th Liege International Video Film Festival for his film ‘Light Harvest' (2000) in Belgium, as well as the Jury Prize in the 11th Brisbane International Film Festival for 'When I Color My Fish' (2002) in Australia, and a special reward from the International Federation for Cinema Club "FICC" for his "They were Here’(2002) in Italy.

Over the past decade, Al-Beik has established a prominent career as a filmmaker in the region.

Equally accomplished in both genres, his photographs have been shown in venues throughout the Middle East, Europe and the US. Since joining Ayyam gallery in 2007, al-Beik has participated in solo and group exhibitions, as well as in many international art fairs.

As a result of his artistic range and background, al-Beik's photographs possess a cinematic quality. Forever embracing experimentation, he works with an assortment of techniques. Often materializing in the form of large ultra-chrome prints, his photographs toy with the manipulation of light and contrast and delve into the art of visual storytelling, holding the narrative of his subjects up with careful scrutiny and heightened sensitivity.

He was a participant in the Syrian cultural caravan (2014–5).

== Works ==
Ammar Al Beik's artworks are in important institutions and private collections such as the Los Angeles County Museum of Art (LACMA).

Al-Beik has also produced and collaborated with several installation art exhibits and events since 2010, including “Colored Earth... Black Chainsaw”, “Oil Leaks” and “Boya Boya Boya” along with other political works that incorporate elements of video, painting, sculpture and animation.

In 2011, he returned to the Venice Film Festival - Official Selection again with the short film “The Sun’s Incubator”, a work that explores the domestic effects of the ‘Arab Spring’, to become the first Syrian filmmaker participating twice in this festival. Since then, this film has participated in more than 50 film festivals including the Palais de Tokyo, Berlin, Rotterdam and São Paulo, and has received several awards, among them the Jury Award at the Busan Film Festival in 2012.

Most recently al-Beik had a solo exhibit at Museum Neukölln, Berlin, Germany (2017) titled "Lost Images Damascus, Berlin", worth to mention that Metropolis program on ARTE did a special episode featuring al-Beik and the exhibit.

In 2017, al-Beik participated in the "Sanctuary" exhibit invited by For-Site Foundation, where 36 artists from 21 different countries to design contemporary rugs reflecting on sanctuary, offering visitors a multiplicity of perspectives on the basic human need for refuge, protection, and sacred ground.

=== Filmography ===
Year	Title	Runtime	Notes
1997	Light Harvest	3 minutes	
2000	They Were Here	8 minutes	
2002	Boulevard Al Assad	1 minute	
2002	My Ear Can See	8 minutes	
2002	When I Color My Fish	5 minutes	
2003	Clapper	58 minutes	
2006	I Am The One Who Brings Flowers To Her Grave	140 minutes	Co Produced & Directed with Hala Al Abdalla
2008	Samia	40 minutes	
2011	The sun's incubator	11 minutes	
2011	Aspirin and A Bullet	125 minutes	
2014	La Dolce Siria	26 minutes	
2015	Kaleidoscope	20 minutes	
2018	Certified Copy for tariff magazine	20 minutes	
