= Nauf AlBendar =

Medical scientist

- Education: BSc in Molecular Genetics and Genomics, MSc in Nutrition & Food Science, PhD in Clinical medicine
- Alma mater: Imperial College London,
- Occupation: Medical scientist
- Known for: Doctor of Clinical Medicine in DOHaD, and the Founder of The Womb Effect & Lahd Gallery
- Website: www.naufalbendar.com

Nauf AlBendar (Arabic: نوف بنت بندر بن محمد آل سعود) also known as Nauf Bendar Al Saud or Nouf Bandar Al Saud is a Saudi Arabian medical scientist known for researching on human health. She is a doctor of Clinical Medicine in DOHaD, and the Founder of The Womb Effect and Lahd Gallery.

== Education ==
AlBendar holds a BSc in Molecular Genetics and Genomics, and an MSc in Nutrition & Food Science. She also holds a PhD in clinical medicine with a speciality in Developmental Origins of Health and Disease (DOHaD) from Imperial College London.

== Career ==
AlBendar began her career as a genetic researcher at the King Faisal Hospital in Riyadh, Saudi Arabia, in 2005. She also founded Lahd Gallery as a pioneering platform for showcasing the contemporary works of emerging regional artists.

In 2019, AlBendar launched The Womb Effect, an educational platform for aspiring, expectant and new parents. She is a fellow of the Royal Society of Medicine and a member of the International DOHaD Society.

== Awards and recognition ==
2011 - Shortlisted as the Woman of the Future in Arts, Media, and Culture at the Women of the Future Awards.

2015 - Distinguished Honoree of the UN Millennium Development Goals: Progress Award for her work with the gallery .

== See also ==
- Lahd Gallery
