= Youssef Abdelke =

Syrian artist (born 1951)

- يوسف عبدلكي
- Born: 1951 (age 74–75); Qamishli, Syrian Republic
- Education: Damascus University, Beaux-Arts de Paris, Paris XIII
- Occupation: Visual artist
- Spouse: Hala Al-Abdallah Yacoub

Youssef Abdelke (Arabic: يوسف عبدلكي; born 1951) is a Syrian visual artist who works in drawing and printmaking. He is one of Syria's leading artists and the husband of the Syrian filmmaker Hala Al-Abdallah Yacoub.

== Biography ==
Abdelke studied at Damascus University, graduating in 1976. He was a political prisoner for two years before being forced into exile in France in the late 1970s. He later graduated from the École Nationale Supérieure des Beaux-Arts and received a PhD in Fine Arts from Paris XIII University.

On 19 July 2013, Syrian government forces arrested him after he signed a declaration calling for the departure of President Bashar al-Assad.

== Reception ==
Abdelke's works are held in public collections, including those of the British Museum, the Institut du Monde Arabe in Paris, the Amman Museum of Modern Art, and the National Museum of Kuwait.

== See also ==
- List of Syrian artists
