= Khaled Akil =

Syrian artist based in Istanbul (born 1986)

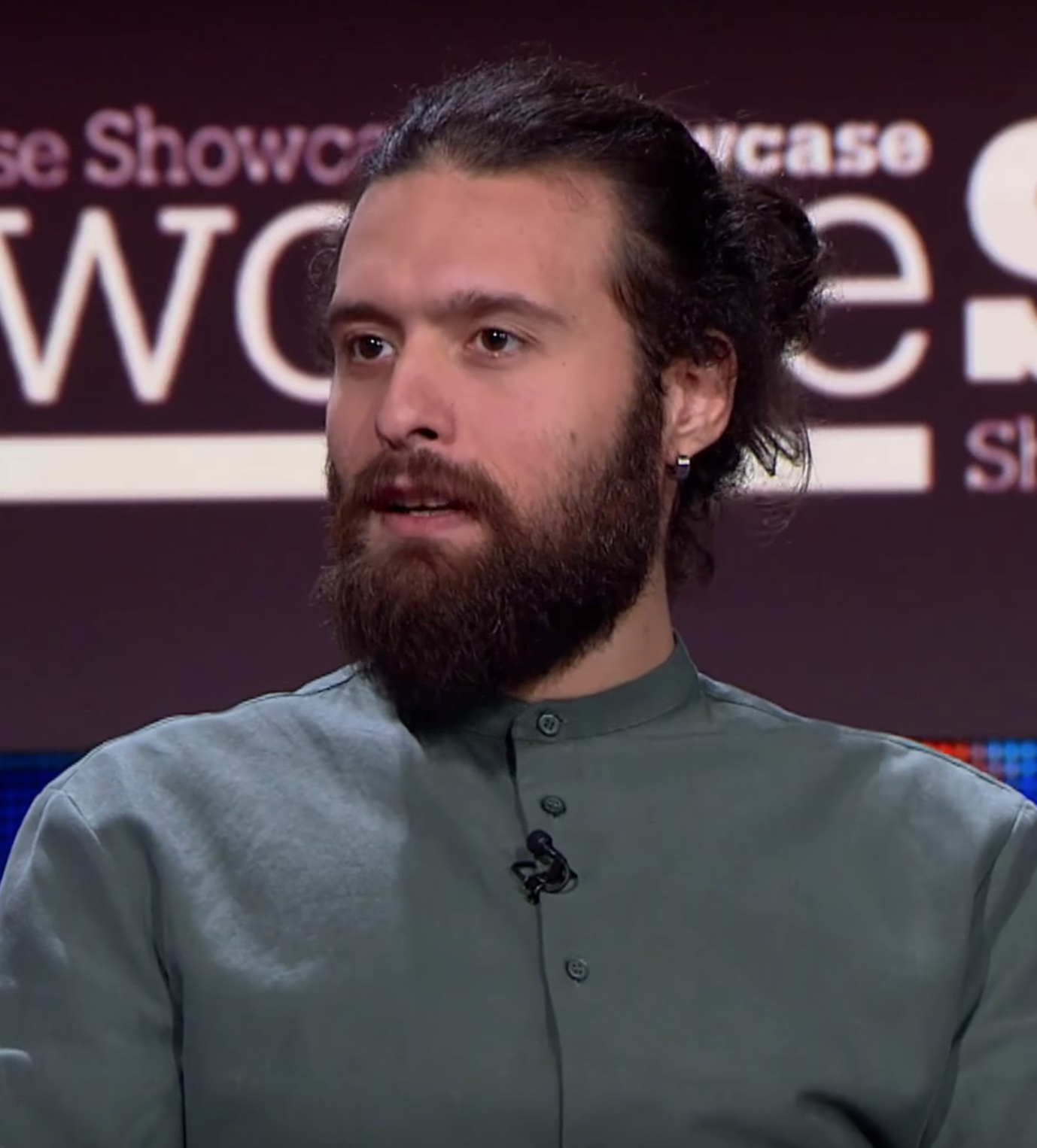
- Education: Beirut Arab University
- Occupation: Mixed media artist
- Website: khaledakil.com

Khaled Akil (born 1986 in Aleppo) is a Syrian artist based in Istanbul. A self-taught artist, he works across a variety of media. He is best known for his photography series Pokémon Go in Syria.

== Biography ==
Khaled Akil was born in Aleppo, Syria, into a family with a long history of artistic and political influence. His father is the renowned painter Youssef Akil. His great maternal grandfather is the Syrian author and historical figure Abd al-Rahman al-Kawakibi.

Akil held his first exhibition in 2009, whilst completing his bachelor's degree in Law. His experience in law, politics and human rights played a major role in his artistic development and outlook.

In 2012, he held a solo exhibition, "The Legend of Death", in Istanbul, where he now resides, having been displaced by the escalating war in Syria.

== Solo exhibitions ==
- 2018 – Requiem for Syria, Brown University, Rhode Island, U.S.
- 2017 – Stanford University, California, U.S.
- 2013 – The Legend of Death, Chalabi Art Gallery, Istanbul, Turkey
- 2012 – The Unmentioned, Lahd Gallery, London, UK
- 2011 – Karma Art Gallery, Aleppo, Syria
- 2010 – Mustafa Ali Art Foundation, Damascus, Syria
- 2009 – Sarmad Art Gallery, Aleppo, Syria

== Group exhibitions ==
- 2019 – Kashash, Bozar Art Museum, Brussels, Belgium
- 2018 – Anti Trump Show, Creative Debuts, London, UK
  Uprooted, World Bank, Washington, D.C., U.S.
  Tribe: Contemporary Photography from the Arab World, American University Museum, Katzen Arts Center, Washington, D.C., U.S.
- 2016 – Flight, West Branch Gallery, Stowe, Vermont, U.S.
  Anna & Mark Art Fair, San Jose, California
  Catharsis, Gaya Art Gallery, Sidi Bou Said
- 2015 – International Discoveries V, FotoFest, Houston, Texas, U.S.
  Woman Through The Eyes, Tajallyat Art Gallery, Beirut
  In-Quest, Gaya Art Gallery, Sidi Bou Said
  Voices from the Middle East, Art in Exile Festival, Washington, D.C.
- 2009 – From Aleppo with Love, Le Pont Gallery, Aleppo, Syria
