= Manal Ajaj =

Syrian fashion designer (born 1978)

- منال عجاج
- Manal Ajaj
- Born: 1978 (age 47–48); Damascus, Syria
- Known for: Alphabet of Jasmine exhibitions
- Label(s): Manal de la Moda, Manolia
- Awards: Ishtar of Syria (2015)

Manal Ajaj (Arabic: منال عجاج; born 1978) is a Syrian fashion designer. She lives in Dubai.

== Early life and education ==
Manal Ajaj was born in 1978. She practised sewing from a very young age and began working in embroidery in the old quarters of Damascus at the age of ten. She designed and presented her first complete wedding gown at the age of fourteen.

== Career ==
At the age of fifteen, she moved to Kuwait to work at Dar'Samalia Fashion House, where she was considered the youngest designer. She continued working there for five years.

At twenty, she returned to Damascus and opened a small atelier. She later travelled to Italy and Thailand to refine her skills, before moving to Al Ain in the Emirate of Abu Dhabi, UAE, where she launched Manal de la Moda, which became one of the largest fashion houses in Al Ain and Abu Dhabi. She also launched her own brand, Manolia, with its main branch in Damascus.

During the Los Angeles Summer Exhibition (2015), part of the Sheikh Mansour bin Zayed Al Nahyan Horse Festival, Ajaj presented fifteen diverse designs distinguished by their quality and style. She used fabrics such as lace, tulle and organza, in summer colours such as pink, white and red.

In her Alphabet of Jasmine exhibitions (2014 and 2015), she presented innovative collections inspired by successive Syrian civilisations: Alphabet of Jasmine I (2014) in Berlin, Alphabet of Jasmine II in Beirut, and Alphabet of Jasmine III in Los Angeles.

== Titles and awards ==
- 2015: Received the title "Ishtar of Syria" for her Alphabet of Jasmine show in Berlin, which was attended by ambassadors despite the diplomatic tensions surrounding Syria.

== Initiatives ==
During the 2020 lockdown, Ajaj launched a charitable initiative to teach sewing free of charge to aspiring designers, presenting twenty designs that subsequently won awards.
