= Houmam Al Sayed =

Syrian artist

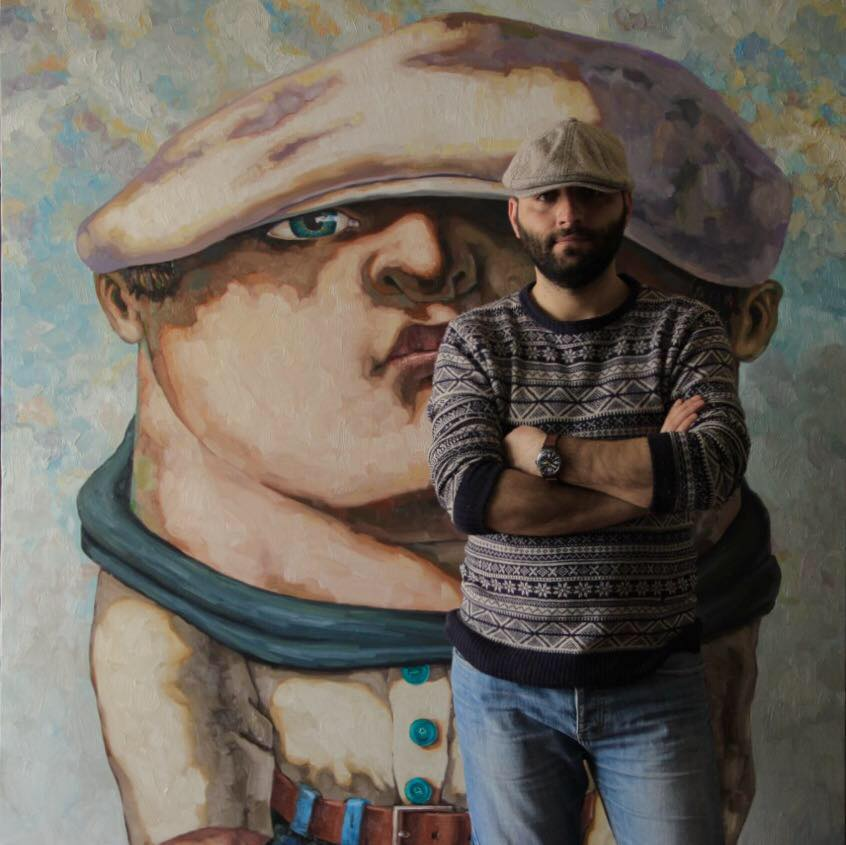
- Born: 1981 (age 44–45); Damascus, Syria
- Known for: Painting and sculpture
- Notable work: Citizen Number Zero
- Style: Contemporary

Houmam Al Sayed (born 1981) is a Syrian contemporary painter and sculptor.

== Biography ==
Born in Damascus, Syria in 1981, Houmam Al Sayed is a contemporary Syrian artist. After studying sculpture, Al Sayed oriented his work to large-scale figurative paintings.

Houmam Al Sayed graduated from the Sculpture Department of the Institute of Applied Arts in Damascus in 2003. He began exhibiting his work at a young age. In 1998 he participated in an exhibition of painting at Teshrin University in Lattakia while he was seventeen years old. Since then, he has exhibited throughout Syria and has participated in group shows and Symposiums in the Arab world and Europe.

== Work ==
Al Sayed works across various media, including painting, drawing, and sculpture.

Sayed's work is characterized by one figure – a stooped male man with a distorted face, bulbous nose, and wide-set eyes arrayed beneath a ubiquitous cloth cap.

The figures in al-Sayed's paintings, drawings and sculptures are swollen and misshapen. The crumpled and crushed characters symbolize the widespread public oppression throughout the Middle East, from military rule in Egypt to war-torn Iraq and Syria. As critic Edward Shalda says on the artist's website, ‘Houmam paints unknown people belonging to a known reality.’

Art critic Marie Tomb, in one of al-Sayed's exhibitions catalog, wrote: “In Houmam al-Sayed’s paintings, it is neither a man, nor an ideology, but a nameless and faceless structure whose countless metamorphoses reemerge anywhere they find detractors to silence and abuse citizens.” She continues: “His characters propose a version of what one might be reduced to when the pressure of religion, the state, and ideology is too much to bear.”

== Selected exhibitions and symposiums ==
Al Sayed work was shown in various solo and group expositions.

- 2017: British Museum, London
- 2017: Atasi Foundation, Dubai
- 2016: Agial Art Gallery, Beirut
- 2014: BOX Freiraum, Berlin
- 2014: Mark Hachem Gallery, Beirut
- 2013: Mark Hachem Gallery, Paris
- 2013: White Box Projects, New York
- 2011: Showcase Gallery, Dubai

== Sources ==
Agial Art Gallery

Middle-East Eye

The Daily Star
