= Nazem al-Jaafari =

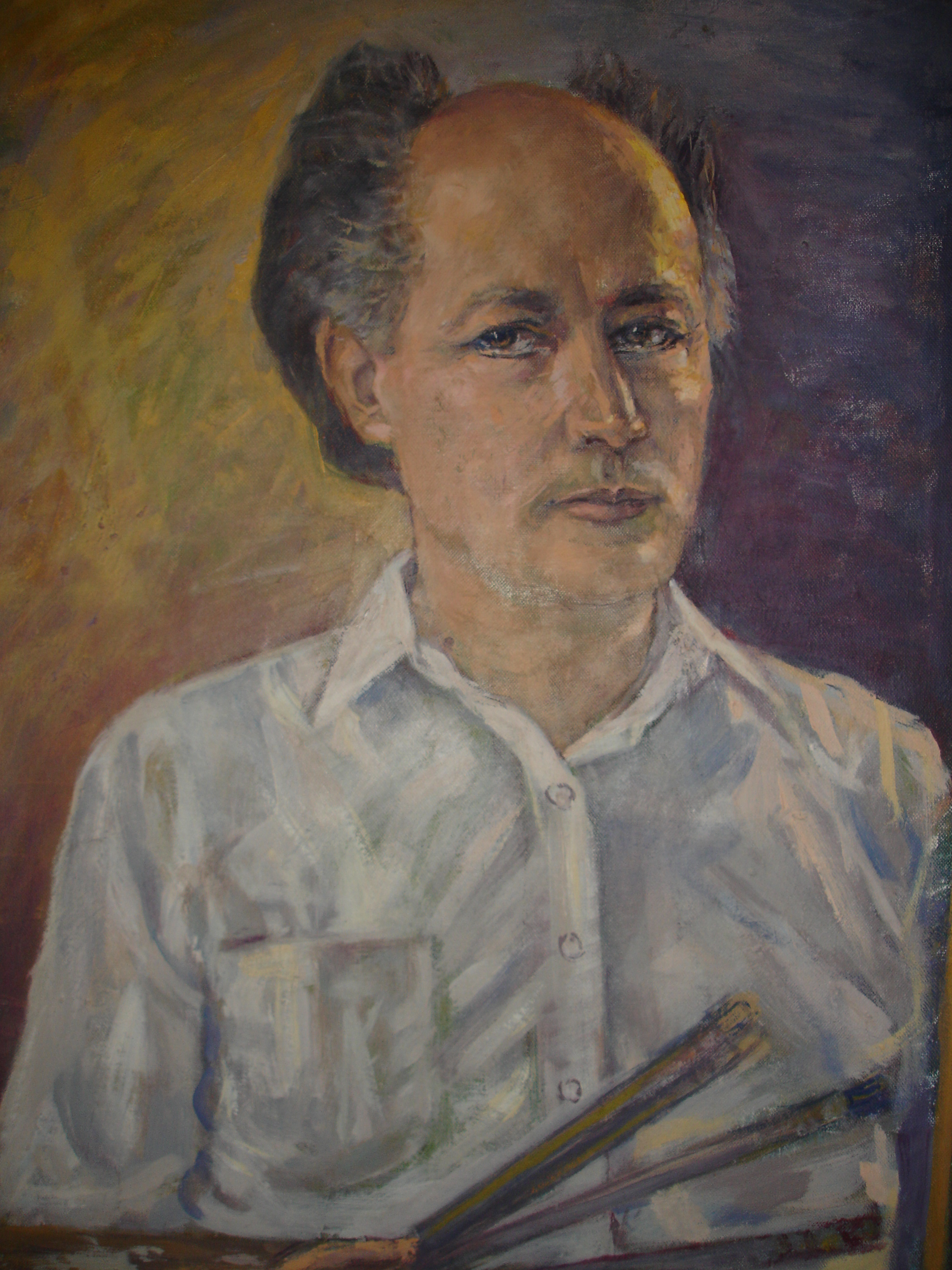
Nazem al-Jaafari – self portrait of the artist, c. 1980s

Nazem al-Jaafari (Arabic: ناظم الجعفري) (born 1918 in Damascus, Syria – 2015) was considered the founder of impressionism in Syria. Al-Jaafari studied at the Faculty of Fine Arts in Cairo from 1944 to 1947, after which he returned to Syria and worked as an art instructor for high school students, then moved to teach at the Faculty of Fine Arts upon its opening in 1960 in Damascus One of his greatest achievements as an artist is the documentation of the old quarters of Damascus as it existed at the turn of the 20th century; subjects included architecture, lifestyles, designs, and fashion.

His body of work consists of over 7,000 portraits, all still part of the artist's collection as he rarely sold his work.

Nazem Al Jaafari was one of the pioneer impressionists of Syrian painting. Impressionism remained the most popular style in Syria both before and after the Second World War. Al Jaafari was a recluse and seldom sold any of his work because he was hoping to preserve his work in a museum for the future generations.

His work was eventually collected by the Museum of Damascus and by several private collectors. His works were auctioned at Bohnam's Dubai in 2008 and at Ayyam Auctions in 2010 (Beirut).
