= Ammar Abd Rabbo =

French-Syrian journalist and photographer

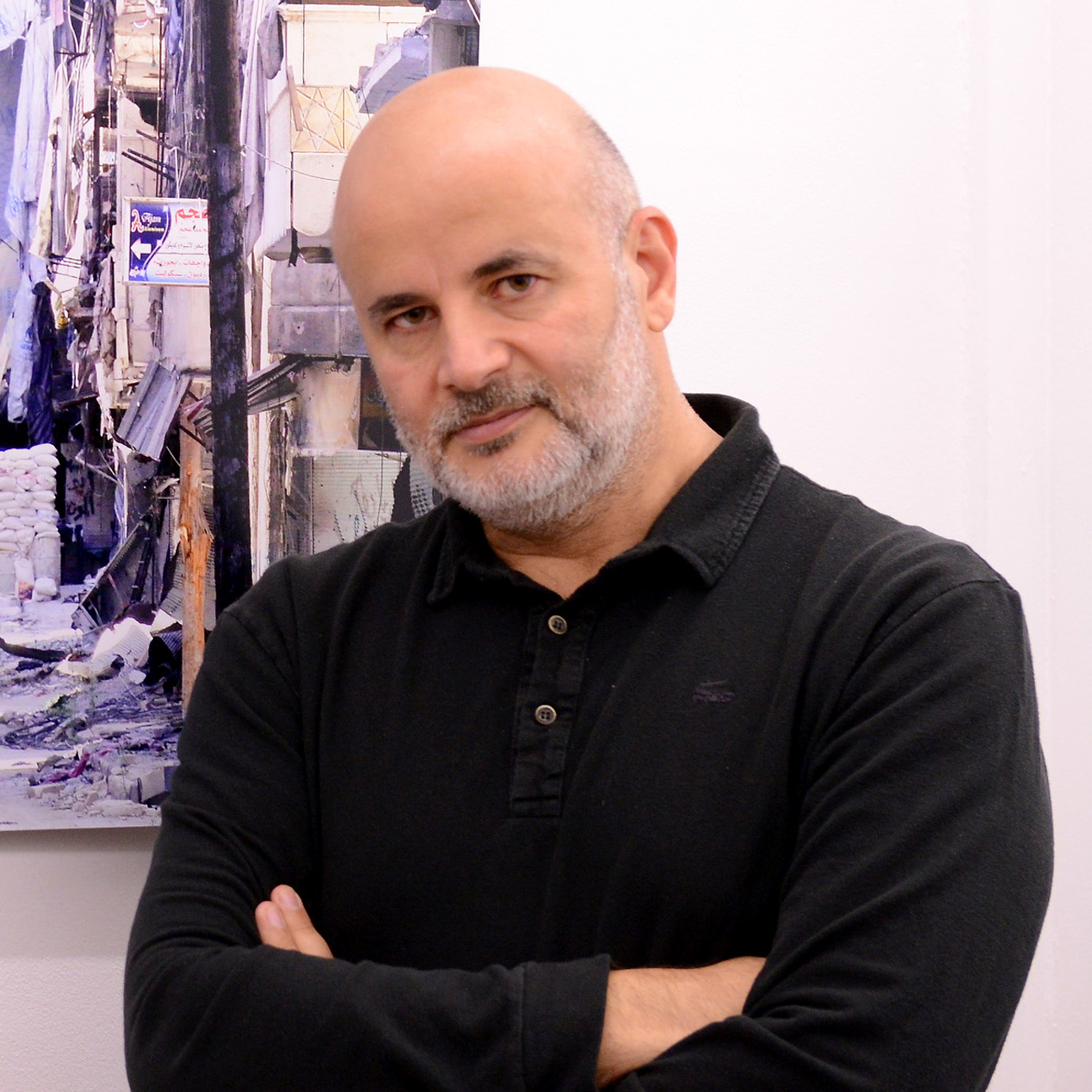
- Ammar Abd Rabbo
- Born: Damascus, Damascus Governorate, Syria
- Citizenship: French
- Occupation(s): Journalist, photographer
- Years active: 1990–present
- Known for: Journalism, photography

Ammar Abd Rabbo (Arabic: عمّار عبد ربّه) is a French-Syrian journalist and photographer, born in Damascus, Syria, in 1966.

Abd Rabbo left Syria in his childhood and has been living in France since 1978. He has covered photo stories in the Arab world since the 1990s in Iraq, Libya and Lebanon, as well as in his homeland, Syria. His work has been published in Time, Le Monde, Der Spiegel, Bild and various other publications.

From a 25-year career, his portfolio includes portraits of head of states, war coverage in Iraq, Lebanon and Libya, celebrities like Michael Jackson, as well as of events such as the Cannes Film Festival and Paris Fashion Week.

Abd Rabbo has also had solo exhibitions of his press work, as well as works about nudity and the body. "Coming Soon" in Beirut in 2012 was a series of artistic silhouettes of pregnant women, aiming to "encourage the audience to think differently about pregnancy" as the artist stated on the television channel Al Arabiya.

He is known for his images of Stephen Hawking, as well as the image of Benazir Bhutto that made the cover of Time magazine after she was assassinated.

In August 2015, one of his works was shown at Dismaland, a temporary exhibition curated by anonymous artist Banksy, that took place in Weston-super-Mare near Bristol, England.

In December 2016, he published a book about Aleppo in war time, in French, titled "ALEP A Elles Eux Paix".

He was awarded "Knight of Arts and Letters" by the French government in 2017.

Since 2018, he is a regular contributor of the website "Daraj", where he publishes videos in Arabic raising awareness about fake news and conspiracy theories.

== Exhibitions ==
- "Love Stories" (collective) – at 61, Paris, 2010.
- "20–40, 20 ans, 40 photos", (solo) at Centre Culturel Français of Damascus, January 2011.
- "Coming Soon", (solo), at Ayyam Gallery, Beirut, February 2012.
- "Follow The Leader" (solo), at Ayyam Gallery, Dubai, June 2012.
- "The Sea Is My Land" (collective), at MAXXI Museum, Roma, July 2013.
- "At My Feet" (collective), at Cindy Glass, Beirut, November 2013.
- "Cris-Action", (collective), at Institut du monde arabe, Paris, May 2014.
- "ALEP : À Elles, Eux, Paix !" (solo), at Gallery Europia, Paris, November 2014.
- "ALEP : À Elles, Eux, Paix !" (solo), at lycée Marguerite de Navarre, Alençon, March 2015
- "My Voice Rings Out for Syria" (collective), at Gallery BOX Freiraum, à Berlin, May 2015
- "Dismaland" (collective), theme park curated by Banksy, in Weston-super-Mare, August 2015
- "Syria Off Frame" (collective), at Fondation Benetton Foundation, in Venice, August 2015
- "The Naked Truth" (solo), at Ayyam Gallery, Beirut, October 2015.
- "ALEP : À Elles, Eux, Paix !" (solo), at "Katara", Doha, March 2016.
- "D'Une Méditerranée L'Autre" (collective), at FRAC PACA (Fonds Régional d'Art Contemporain – Provence Alpes Côte d'Azur), Marseilles, November 2016
