= Nazir Nabaa =

Syrian painter (born 1938)

- Born: 1938; Damascus, Syria
- Died: 2016 (aged 77–78); Damascus, Syria
- Education: College of Fine Arts in Cairo, École nationale supérieure des Beaux-Arts
- Known for: Painting

Nazir Nabaa (Arabic: نذير نبعة) (born 1938 in Damascus, Syria) was a Syrian painter. Considered a pioneer of modern Syrian art, he studied at the College of Fine Arts in Cairo in Cairo from 1959 to 1965, during the time of the United Arab Republic. He continued his training at the École nationale supérieure des Beaux-Arts in Paris from 1971 to 1974. After completing his studies, he returned to Damascus and joined the faculty of the College of Fine Arts at Damascus University. Nabaa's style is noted for blending ancient visual culture with modern themes, and his work has been shown in exhibitions at museums such as the Jordan National Gallery of Fine Arts.

== Awards ==
- 1968: Judges Panel's Award; Biennial; Alexandria.
- 1979: Diploma, Bratislava International Exhibition, Children drawing and painting.
- Ecole Supérieure des Beaux-Arts, special award, for "works leading to graduation."
- 1995: Judges Panel's Award, Cairo International Biennial.
