= Kais Salman =

Syrian painter, based in Damascus (born 1976)

Kais Salman (born 1976) is a Syrian painter, based in Damascus. His technique has been described as "monochromatic, abstract expressionism," and a departure from the work done by previous generations of Syrian painters, who had been more influenced by Soviet art. Like other contemporary Syrian artists, Salman has benefited from his country's increasing contact and popularity on the international art market, including the art auction houses of Dubai, with his paintings increasing sixfold in value from 2006 to 2010, and now selling for as much as €17,500. He is represented by the Ayyam Gallery.

Born in Tartus, Salman graduated from the Faculty of Fine Arts Damascus in 2002. Featured in countless group exhibitions in Syria and the Arab world, including the 4th Annual Youth exhibition in Damascus where he took first prize and the inaugural exhibition of the Damascus Museum of Modern Art, Salman has been a regular fixture of high-profile shows. Recently he has become essential to Ayyam's lineup participating in such standout events as its “Shabab Uprising,” “Young Collectors Auction (I and II)” and “Damascus Calling,” an exhibition held at The Park Avenue Armory in New York City in 2008. A favorite among collectors, his work is housed throughout the Middle East, North Africa and Europe.
