= Khaled al-Khani =

Syrian painter (born 1975)

- Born: 17 February 1975 (age 51); Hama, Syria
- Education: Fine Arts of Damascus
- Movement: expressionism, figurative art, abstract art
- Website: khaledalkhani.com

Khaled al-Khani (born 17 February 1975) is a Syrian painter, currently living in Paris. Following the Syrian revolt, he has made manifest his anti-regime stance.

== Work ==
Al-Khani is an artist whose works include oil painting and mural painting. His work focuses on people, whether individuals or groups, as well as women. Some have compared his artistry to the German Expressionist movement beginning before the period of the First World War, such as Otto Dix.

Memories of the conflict in Syria have a profound influence on al-Khani's work. Regarding his representation of Um Ibrahim, he says, "One might ask why I am drawing Um Ibrahim in such a beautiful way, as a pretty woman. In my mind, I remember the old woman Um Ibrahim's image, this is more beautiful than a pretty girl, this woman who opposed the killers in 1982. I see her as an image, in a higher place, that needs to be painted. In fact, my painting are closely related to my memories of what happened in Hama, it comes from my childhood, what I witnessed daily, memories of the Hama massacre. Such events leave a deep-cut memory in me that is hard to remove. I believe, in my artistic process, these memories are visible in my paintings. It has something to do with how I see the woman. The woman, the most essential and available person, she was the hero of my paintings."

== Early years ==
Khaled al-Khani was born in the ancient neighborhood of Albarodiah in Hama. At the age of seven, he lost his father, an ophthalmologist, to the Hama Massacre under the presidency of Hafez el-Assad in February 1982. As a child, his mother noticed his passion for drawing and colorimetry and encouraged him to pursue this area. As an adolescent, he started to visit the atelier of Sohail Alahdab, where he learned various pictorial techniques and clay modeling. After graduating from school, he moved to Damascus to pursue studies at the School of Fine Arts. Even as a student, he started to sell his paintings to cover costs. In 1998, he obtained his diploma in painting, then in 2000 obtained his Master's degree.

== Work in Damas ==
The Damascus gallery Naseer Shura received the first three exhibitions of Khaled al-Khani in 1999, 2000, and 2001.The dominant colour in these series is brown, and the aesthetic employs effects of contre-jour. Al-Kani's presentation to the Arab artistic scene began in Kuwait, where he presented his first exhibition at the Museum of Baytlothan in 2001, followed by another exhibition the following year at the Boushahri Gallery. Individual exhibitions took place in Dubai, Jordan and Lebanon as well. In parallel to solo shows, Khaled took part in various group exhibitions, including one organized by the Alsayed gallery at Damascus. He also participated in various artistic events, including the symposium of painting and sculpture of Ehden, which takes place every year at Mount Lebanon. His paintings from late 2010 show a difference from previous work, with the colours becoming brighter, although the subjects of the painting appear to follow a narrative thread, as if each painting were a fixed moment in a long novel.

== Work in Paris ==
Three months after the start of the popular uprising in Syria, Khaled al-Khani was forced to escape his country. He is wanted for his part in popular demonstrations in Damas against the President Bachar el-Assad and for having published a series of articles denouncing the 1982 massacre at Hama, for many years a taboo subject in the history of Syria. He arrived in Paris in June 2011, where he waited for one year before taking up his work again. Horrified by the violence unleashed in his country, very violent imagery emerges in al-Khani's painting at this time, depicting deformed figures, disfigured faces, and the agitated masses.

In 2012, he exhibited work at the Cité internationale des arts in Paris. In February 2013, he did a second collaboration for the gallery Cheloudiakoff in Belfort.

In 2012, he did various exhibitions in the Middle East, including "Non-Stop Dancing" at the Orient gallery in Amman.

In 2013, the museum Kunsthalle zu Kiel in Kiel, Germany, invited Khaled al-Khani to exhibit a mural painting in the museum. In a large viewing gallery, Khaled painted in an expressionist style scenes that appear to be extracted from everyday life in Syria. In the beginning of 2014, his exhibition Portrait was held at the la galerie Europa in Paris.

From 2014 to 2015, he was a participant in the Syrian cultural caravan.
