= Riad Beyrouti =

Syrian painter (1944–2019)

- ریاض بیروتي
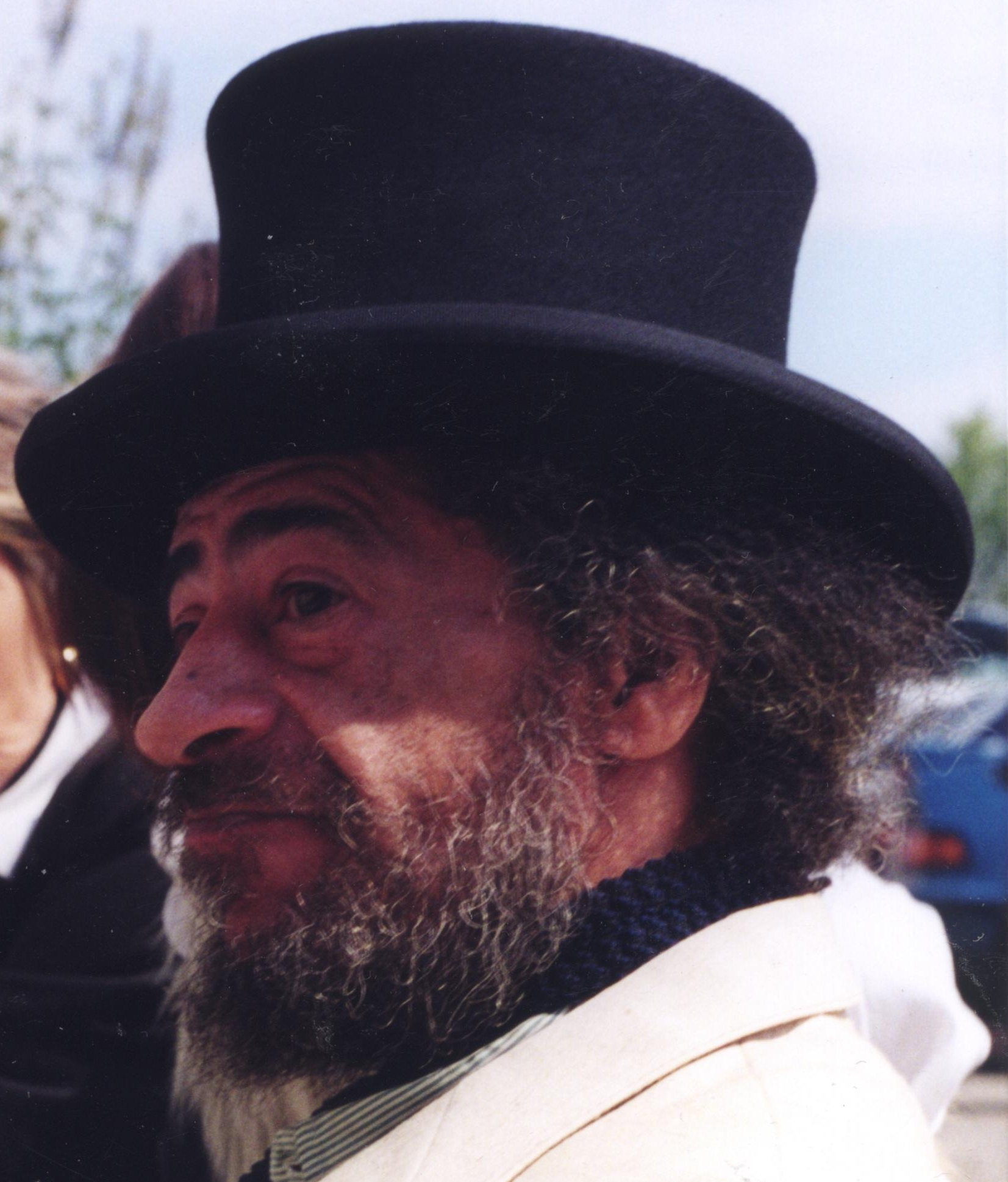
- Riad Beyrouti in 2006
- Born: 6 May 1944; Damascus, Syria
- Died: 4 November 2019 (aged 75); Honfleur, France
- Education: Damascus National School of Fine Arts; École nationale supérieure des Beaux-Arts, Paris
- Known for: Painting, sculpture
- Notable work: Platon (1968), Man and Time (1968)
- Website: http://riad.beyrouti.free.fr

Riad Beyrouti (Arabic: ریاض بیروتي; 6 May 1944 – 4 November 2019) was a Syrian painter. Born in Damascus, he lived in Lower Normandy from 1969 until his death.

== Biography ==
Riad Beyrouti graduated from the Damascus National School of Fine Arts, where he had majored in sculpture. He moved to France in 1969 and attended the École nationale supérieure des Beaux-Arts in Paris, also majoring in sculpture. César Baldaccini was head of the sculpture department at that time.

Beyrouti took part in various exhibitions in Caen and Honfleur.

== Works ==
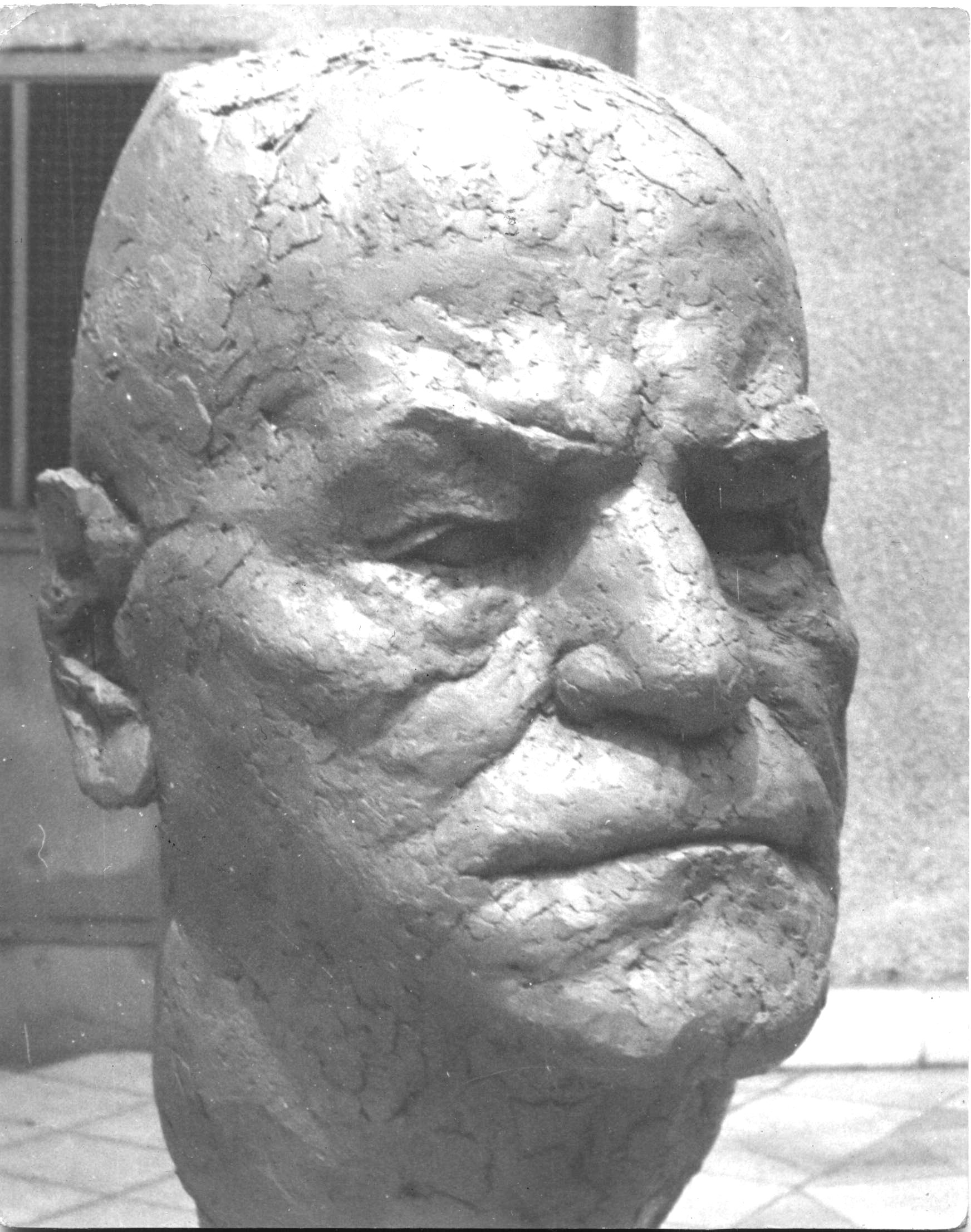
Sculpture

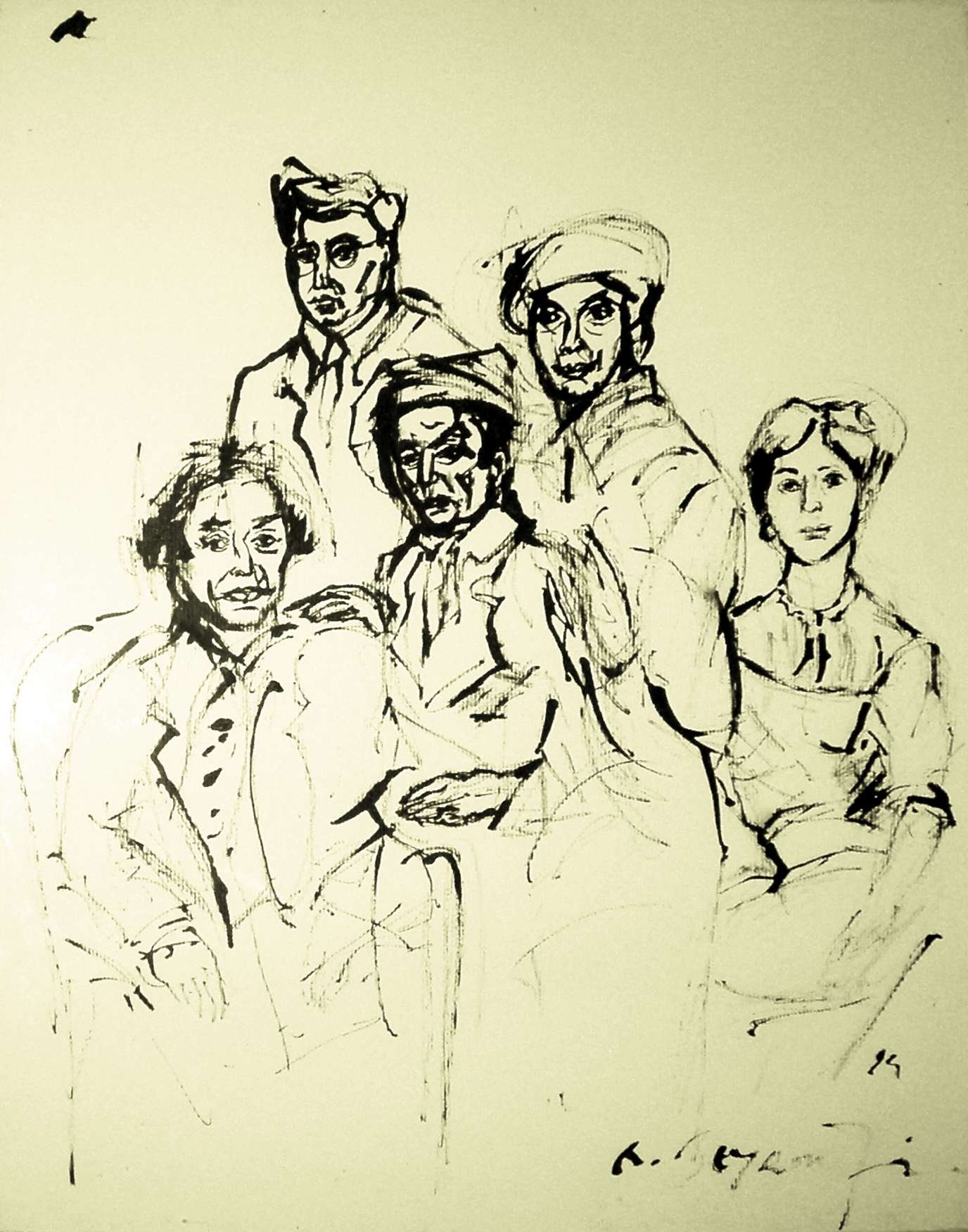
Monochrome

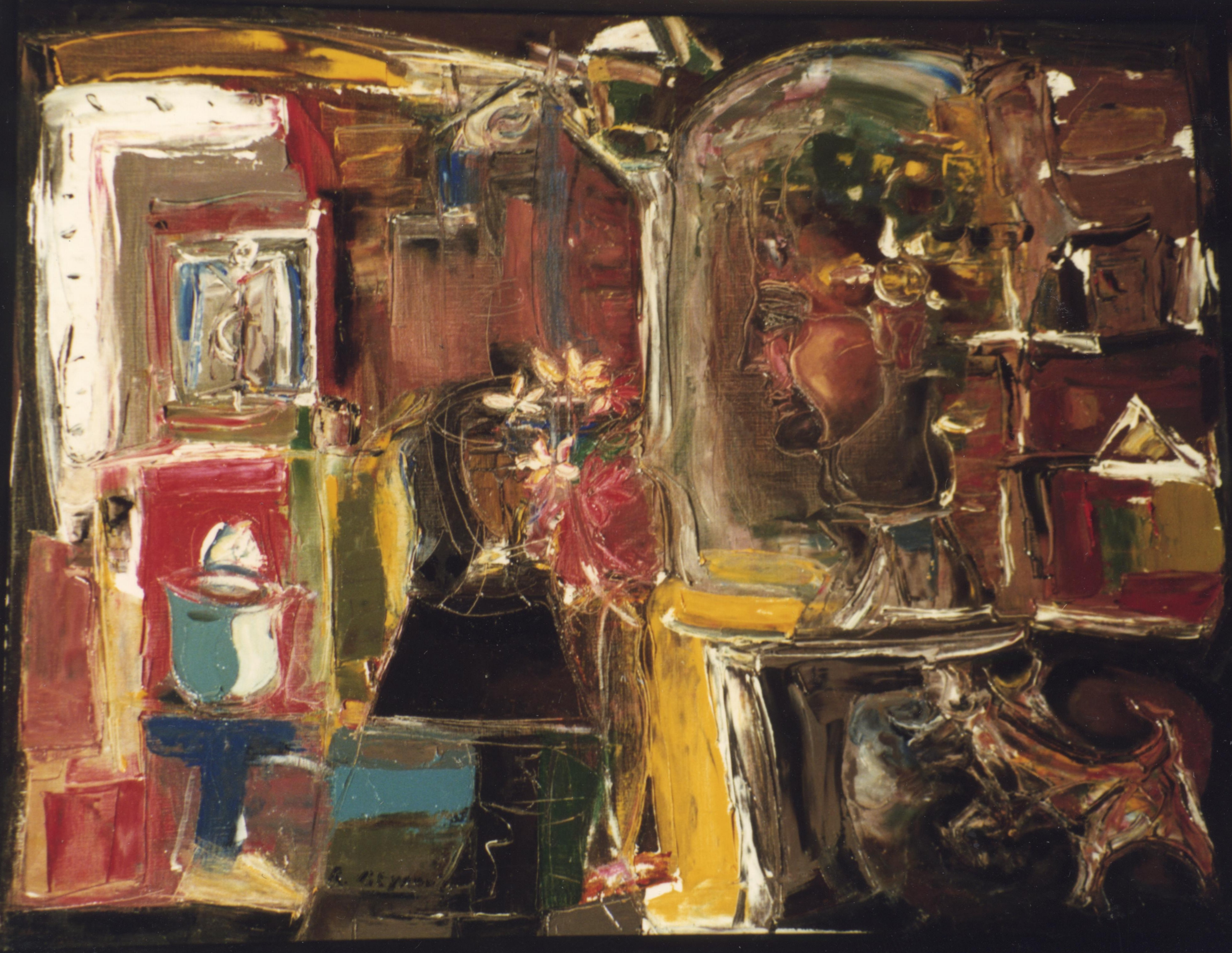
Oil on canvas

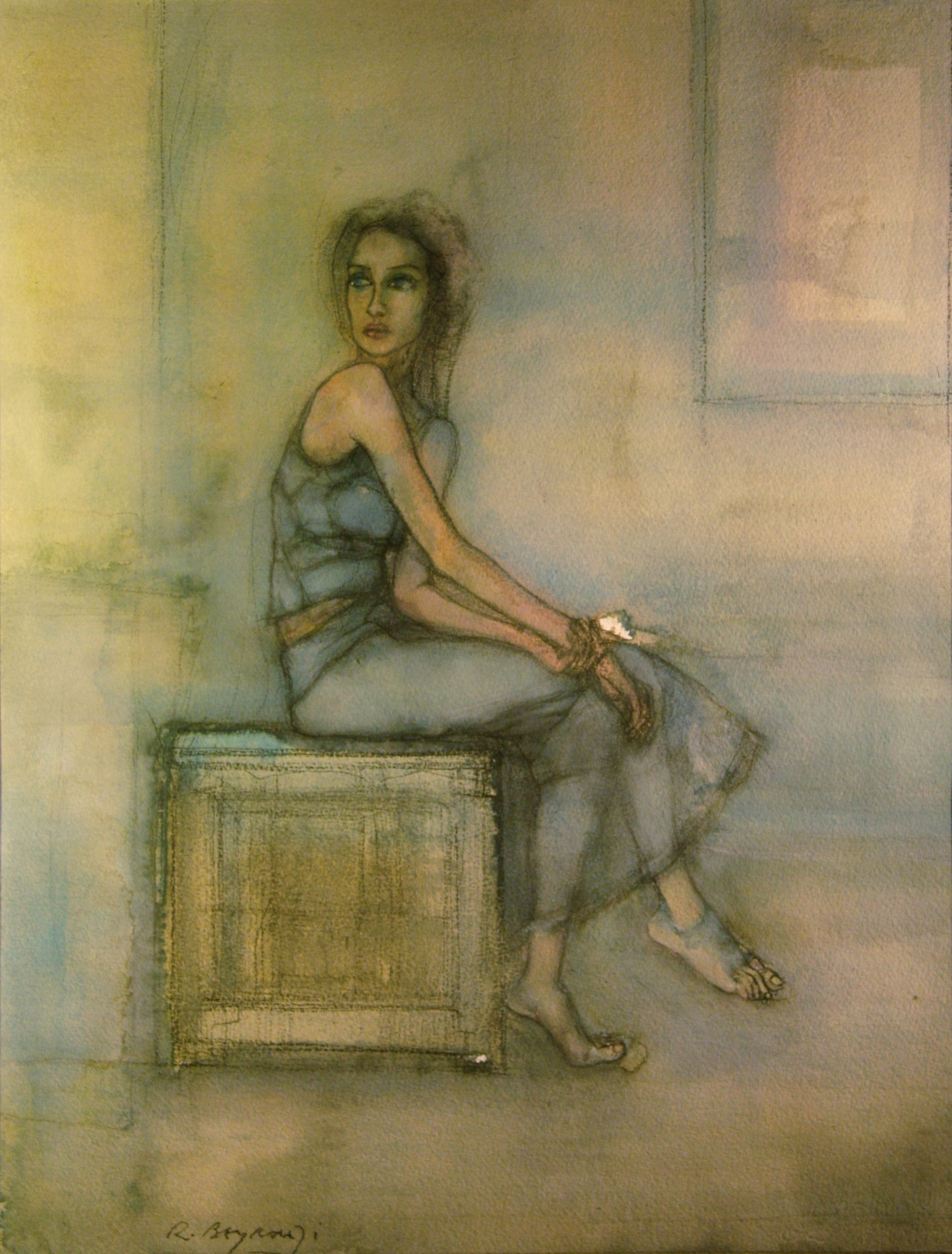
Ink on paper

=== Sculpture ===
- Platon, 1968
- Man and Time, 1968

=== Painting ===
- Ink painting
- Oil painting

=== Pricing ===
An ink painting on paper (54 × 58 cm) was acquired by the Lower Normandy region on 24 February 1984 for the price of 7,200 francs.
