= Nihad Gule =

Syrian painter

- Born: 7 April 1968; Anqala, Syria
- Style: Expressive art
- Website: www.nihadgule.com

Nihad Gule (born 7 April 1968) is a Syrian painter. He was born in Anqala, Syria.

He was a member of the Syrian Fine Arts Association and wrote regularly on fine arts for Syrian and Arab newspapers as an art critic.

In November 2014, he moved to Germany, where he continues to live and work.

He has taken part in a number of solo exhibitions in the Arab world:

- "Red & Yellow", Khanji Art Gallery, Aleppo, 1995
- Fine Arts Association Gallery, Aleppo, 2000
- Fine Arts Association Gallery, Aleppo, 2004
- Dar Al Mada Art Gallery, Damascus, 2005
- Foresight Art Gallery, Amman, Jordan, 2007

And in Germany:

- Kulturwerkstatt, Remagen, November 2015

In December 2015, he was invited by Julia Klöckner, then president of the CDU in Rheinland-Pfalz, to exhibit his work at the Landtag in Mainz.
