= Iqbal Naji Karesly =

Iqbal Naji Karesly (Arabic: إقبال ناجي قارصلي; 1925–1969) was a Syrian painter. A pioneering woman in the Arab art world, in 1964 she became the first female Syrian artist to hold a solo exhibition.

== Biography ==
Iqbal Naji Karesly was born in Damascus, Syria, in 1925, and grew up in Zabadani. Her father, Mohammad Naji, was a lover of the arts and named her after the poet Muhammad Iqbal. Her first creative interest as a young girl was embroidery.

When she was 15 years old, she married a man around 30 years her senior. She followed her husband to Palmyra, where he was working, and the couple lived there for 11 years, until 1950. They had two children: the artist Walid Karesly and the filmmaker Mohammed Karesly.

In Palmyra, she lived in a house whose previous resident, a French officer, had decorated its walls with paintings in a Western style that her husband's colleagues deemed inappropriate. Not wanting to lose the decoration, Naji Karesly painted over the nudes in Arab dress and added new details to the pictures – a project that inspired her to pursue art. She was self‑taught as an artist, reading extensively and completing a correspondence course with the Jawahiri Institute in Egypt from 1956 to 1958.

Karesly is considered a pioneer among women artists in the Arab world. In 1964, she became the first Syrian woman artist to have her own solo show, which was held at the International Modern Art Gallery in Damascus. She also participated in a wide variety of group exhibitions both in Syria and abroad between 1954 and 1969.

Her painting blended stark realism and impressionism, employing bright, thick colours. She enjoyed painting nature, often recalling the landscapes of her childhood in Zabadani, but also addressed contemporary issues in Syria in her work.

Karesly was also active in advocating for women's rights in Syria, as well as for literacy.

Eventually, she began suffering from convulsions and other intense symptoms, so she sought treatment in Europe, where she also continued to exhibit her art and was named an honorary member of the Association of German Artists. However, her symptoms persisted, and she died in Damascus in 1969, at the age of 44. Her early death was attributed to chronic lead poisoning from the lead‑based oil paints that she used for her work.
