= Khaled Barakeh =

Syrian contemporary artist and cultural activist (born 1976)

- Born: 1976 (age 49–50); Damascus, Syria
- Education: Faculty of Fine Arts, Damascus; Funen Art Academy (MFA); Städelschule (Meisterschüler)
- Occupations: Artist; Cultural activist
- Years active: 2005–present
- Organization: coculture e.V.
- Website: www.khaledbarakeh.com

Khaled Barakeh (born 1976) is a Syrian contemporary artist and cultural activist based in Berlin, Germany. Originally a calligrapher who trained as a painter in Damascus, he later studied in Denmark and Germany, developing a multidisciplinary practice.

== Early life and education ==
Barakeh was born in 1976 in a suburb of Damascus, Syria, where he spent his early years. He studied Fine Arts at the University of Damascus, completing his undergraduate studies in 2005. In 2008, he moved to Denmark to continue his artistic development, enrolling at the Funen Art Academy, where he earned a Master of Fine Arts degree in 2010. He later became a Meisterschüler under Simon Starling at the Städelschule in Frankfurt am Main.

== Career ==
Following his relocation from Syria to Europe, Barakeh shifted from painting to a multidisciplinary practice that incorporates installation, social engagement and conceptual approaches. His work addresses themes of social injustice, migration and displacement, often reflecting his experience as an exiled Syrian artist.

== Exhibitions and projects ==
His public work The Muted Demonstration was presented on the lawn outside a courthouse in Koblenz, Germany, during the war crimes trial of former Syrian intelligence officials. The installation comprised 49 faceless figures, dressed in the clothing of torture victims, standing silently with raised arms in a visual protest visible from the courtroom windows.

In June 2024, he curated the performative exhibition ABSENCED at Malmö City Library in Sweden. The project brought together artists who had been censored, or "cancelled", in Germany, particularly in relation to pro-Palestinian expression, and included installations such as printers generating prints and letters, as well as booklets documenting cases of suppression.

Also in 2024, Barakeh presented The Shake at The MAC in Belfast, Northern Ireland. Supported by the Cultural Bridge programme and the Arts Council of Northern Ireland, the exhibition reflected on what unites communities, rather than what divides them.

Earlier solo presentations include Die blaue Stunde (The Blue Hour) at the Museum für Kunst und Gewerbe in Hamburg in 2018, and Aufheben at Galerie Heike Strelow in Frankfurt am Main. In 2022, he exhibited Design of Necessity in Copenhagen, a participatory project that engaged Syrian activists, photographers and refugees in Denmark, exploring resilience and collective memory. In 2024, he also collaborated on Syrian Images Beyond the Archive at the University of Copenhagen, part of the "Archiving the Future" programme linking art and scholarship.

Barakeh has participated in major international group exhibitions. In 2018, he took part in the Busan Biennale in South Korea, where his work was shown alongside other international artists in the main exhibition Divided We Stand. He was also featured in the group exhibition In Plain Sight at Smack Mellon, New York, in 2020, which brought together artists addressing surveillance, state violence and visibility. In 2023–24, his work appeared in Cities Under Quarantine: The Mailbox Project at Mathaf: Arab Museum of Modern Art in Doha, Qatar, among works by dozens of contributing artists.
