= Lahd Gallery =

Contemporary art gallery

Coordinates: 51°33′29.7″N 0°10′41.3″W

Lahd Gallery is a contemporary Middle Eastern art gallery. Founded by Nauf AlBendar in 2005 in Riyadh, Saudi Arabia, to create a focal point for women artists from the Persian Gulf, in 2010 it moved to its present location in Hampstead, London.

Lahd Gallery is an exhibition space representing exclusively MENASA (Middle East, North Africa, South Asia) contemporary art. Artists are exposed to an international market using an online e-gallery, as well as yearly international pop venues, fairs and events all over the world.
