= Hala Al-Abdallah Yacoub =

Syrian cinematographer and director

Hala Alabdalla (born 1956 in Hama, Syria) is a Syrian cinematographer and director. She currently lives in Paris, producing movies. She is known for Je suis celle qui porte les fleurs vers sa tombe ("I Am She who Brings the Flowers to her Grave"), Comme si nous attrapions un cobra ("As If We Were Catching a Cobra"), and Besieged Like Me (2016).

== History ==
As a young woman, Hala was highly involved in politics. She was arrested at the age of 20 and spent 14 months in jail. Later, she moved to Paris with her husband, Youssef Abdelke. There she decided to embark in cinema, and contacted her friends Amiralay, Malas and Mohammad for guidance. Their advice, to let the idea go, only increased her passion grow and determination.

== Cinema and politics ==
Hala started working in cinema at 31, traveling between France and Syria. Originally an artistic collaborator, she became a co-director. She is the producer and manager of a company named Ramadfilm in Syria.

At 50, she released her well-known documentary “I Am the One Who Brings Flowers to Her Grave”, the movie was a great success and recognized internationally, winning awards at the Venice Film Festival and the Dubai International Film Festival. It was also nominated at the Venice Film Festival for another award, and garnered additional nominations at the Yamagata International Documentary Film Festival and the Nantes Three Continents Film Festival. She used cinema as an instrument, a mean of communication whether for politics or poetry. Hala lived near the Damacus Ciné Club, and used to discuss cinema with its owners at the time — Omar Amiralay, Moaammad Malas, and others. After a time she felt the need to make movies herself, drawn by their potential for carrying a strong political message or advocating for a cause. To her, the movies began to be something shaped like a work of art, as an aesthetic audio-visual base. I Am the One Who Brings Flowers to Her Grave reflects her journey in cinema, the political message as a work of art.

== Cinematography ==
- Omar Amiralay - Sorrow, Time and Silence (2021)
- Comme si nous attrapions un cobra, As If We Were Catching A Cobra, (2012)
- Hé! N'oublie pas le cumin, Hey! Don't Forget the Cumin, (2008)
- Yolla, Un retour vers soi (2008), for France Culture.
- I Am the One Who brings Flowers to Her Grave (2006)
- L'homme aux semelles d'or, The Man with Golden Soles, (2000), with Omar Amiralay

== Importance of documentaries ==
Documentaries are essential to a developing country like Syria, in the eyes of Hala Abdallah, tools of liberation from the struggle that is lived every day. Documentaries enrich the eyes of the audience after the 40 years of commercial and manipulated movies they have been seeing. Hala has said that documentaries should be introduced and be in demand from audiences. However, Syria is one of the countries that is resisting these new forms of expression and work. Documentaries have their own language that people get after being exposed enough to documentaries.

== Censorship and cinema ==
Determination is a necessity in the field of documentaries to give them the true, brave and free feel. Hala says that "a documentary cannot be neutral and objective, must not be. Otherwise, it becomes similar to propaganda films. A documentary must take a stand and defend it through he choice of a subject, the axis of treatment and the desired result. All this requires a deep commitment; each documentary must be a fight and an adventure.“We make a film to defend freedom, but we must also do it in freedom.”

== Ramadfilm ==
The three directors, Omar Amiralay, Mohammad Malas, and Omar Mohammad formed a unity where Hala joined them and started producing films with love and deep commitment. Ramadfilm started 20 years ago in Lebanon, under the name of Maram CTV. With the return of Omar Amiralay to Syria, Maram CTV moved to Damascus with a new name; Ramadfilm. Chaired by Omar Amiralay, Ramadfilm produced all of Amiralay's documentaries, as well as The Night by Malas, and Sacrifices from O. Mohammad, and the films of some French directors.

== Je suis celle qui porte les fleurs vers sa tombe, I Am She who Brings the Flowers to her Grave ==
This is one of the movies that Hala is well known for, it was the winner of Best Documentary Award in Venice.

It is a journey through the Syrian landscape. Hala merged poetry with film-making. Poetry was a main element in the movie, it illustrated the longing that her friends have for Syria. Some people went into exile and will never see their country again, some of which are her friends that live in Paris yet they still miss their homeland. The movie contains interviews with three of her friends who chose to leave Syria for France. It also shows that the political exile ended up being and inner exile in the people even while leaving in France. Poetry is the main component of this movie, it shows the impact of poetry on people and everyday situations.

== Bibliography ==
- Armes, Roy; Arab Filmmakers of the Middle East (English)
- La situation du documentaire en Syrie: rencontre avec Hala Alabdalla, by Florence Ollivry, Babelmed (in French), accessed 2016-11-30
