= Aula Al Ayoubi =

Syrian painter and visual artist

- Born: 1973 (age 52–53); Damascus, Syria
- Education: University of Damascus, Institute of Fine Arts of Damascus
- Occupations: Painter, artist
- Movement: Painting, collage

Aula Al Ayoubi, born in 1973 in Damascus, is a Syrian painter and visual artist.

== Biography ==
Aula Al Ayoubi studied mathematics and educational sciences at the University of Damascus. She graduated from the Institute of Fine Arts of Damascus. She is a member of the Association of Fine Arts of Syria.

== Works ==
The collages of Al Ayoubi mix different media. Her creations represent portraits of the most iconic women from her childhood, from Egyptian actress Faten Hamama to Lebanese singer Fairuz to the icon of Egyptian music Umm Kulthum. Punctuated with rich and colorful details, her dynamic compositions convey her own emotional feelings in front of these famous people.

The artist uses a bright and bold palette of colors and her collage technique gives her paintings a rich diversity of textures. Al Ayoubi's works are exhibited in Syria and Kuwait. Her painting is also presented in private collections.

In 2015, she participated in the first international meeting of Mediterranean art, organized by Col·lectiu Mediterrani. Fourteen Spanish, Italian, Syrian, Moroccan and Turkish artists take part in a contemporary style exhibition mixing painting, sculpture, poetry or photography.

In 2017, Al Ayoubi participated in the exhibition Radical Love: Female Lust, which brought together nearly 50 women Arab artists around Arabic poetry written by women mainly between the 7th century and 12th century. As a response to President Donald Trump's ban on travel to the United States, artists anchor their works and illustrations in women's sexual pleasure.

== Exhibitions ==
- Solo exhibition at Free Hand Gallery, Damascus, Syria, 2008
- Solo exhibition at Museum of Modern Art, Kuwait City, Kuwait, 2009
- Solo exhibition, Tilal Gallery, Shuwaikh, Kuwait, 2011
- Solo exhibition, Roaya Gallery, Jeddah, Saudi Arabia, 2012
- Solo exhibition, Markhiya Gallery, Doha, Qatar, 2012
- Aula Al Ayouby, Tilal Gallery, Shuwaikh, Kuwait, 17–28 November 2013
- Trobada Internacional of Art Mediterrani, Col·lectiu Mediterrani, Es Polvorí Foundation, Dalt Vila, Baleares, 28 January – 25 February 2016
- Radical Love: Female Lust, The Crypt Gallery, London, 14 February – 5 March 2017
- Seventeenth ArtsWorcester Biennial, Worcester MA, 2017
- Solo Exhibition, ArtsWorcester Gallery, Worcester, MA, 2017
- Spring Revolution, Beacon Gallery, Boston Massachusetts 7 June - 28 July 2019
