= Bengin Ahmad =

Syrian photographer

- بنکین أحمد
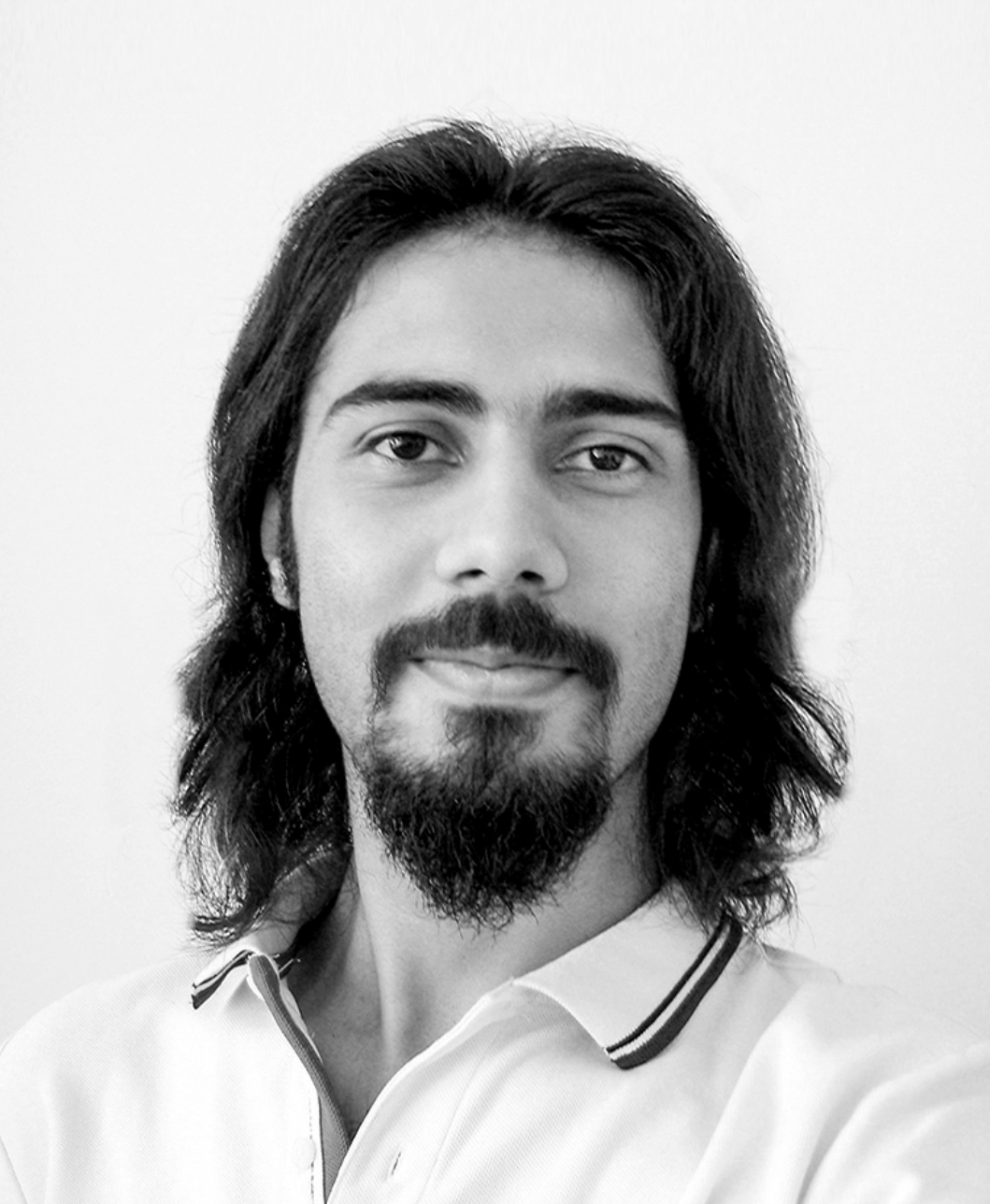
- Born: Aleppo, Syria
- Occupations: Artist, photographer and creative director
- Years active: 2007–present
- Website: benginahmad.com

Bengin Ahmad (Arabic: بنكين أحمد; Kurdish: Bengîn Ehmed) is a Syrian Kurdish photographer and creative director, known for his candid images of horses and equine subjects, architecture and portraiture. He holds a Crown Distinction from the Global Photographic Union (GPU).

== Biography ==
Bengin Ahmad was born in Aleppo into a Kurdish family, where he was exposed to the arts of the city's diverse ethnicities and cultures. These early experiences fostered his passion for digital art, graphic design, animation, filmmaking and photography. He studied Geological Sciences at the University of Aleppo before moving to Dubai, United Arab Emirates, where he worked as a creative director and continued his studies in Business Management. Since 2011, he has lived and worked in both Germany and Dubai.

== Photography ==
Ahmad began his journey in photography in 2007. The old streets of Aleppo, the city's citadel and portraits of people from different Syrian ethnicities were among his earliest subjects.

In 2009, he held his first solo photography exhibition in Aleppo. He has since obtained the Crown 1 distinction from the Global Photographic Union (GPU).

His work has also been published by ABC News, The London Magazine, HuffPost, United Nations Regional Information Centre (UNIRC), the BBC, Reason, Samsung C&T Corporation, and ArchDaily.

On 28 February 2024, Ahmad participated in the Xposure International Photography Festival in Sharjah, United Arab Emirates, where he exhibited 21 equine photographs in his show "Freedom Horses of Kurdistan".

=== Equine photography ===
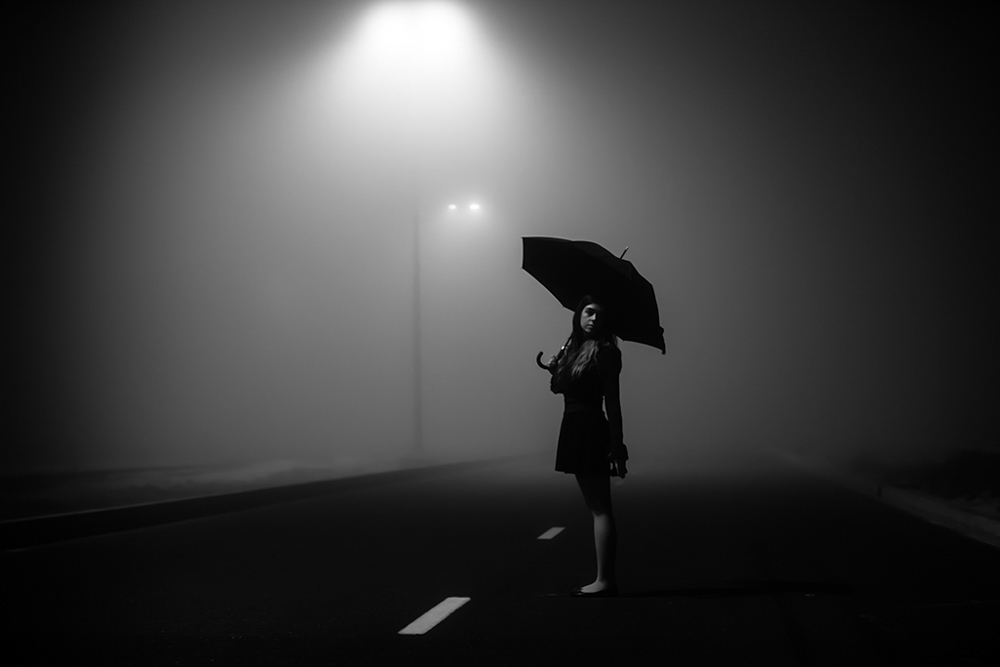
Faded Path by Ahmad

He travels to countries and regions where horses are bred and cared for, such as the UAE, Germany, Kurdistan in Iraq, Luxembourg and France, to capture his images.

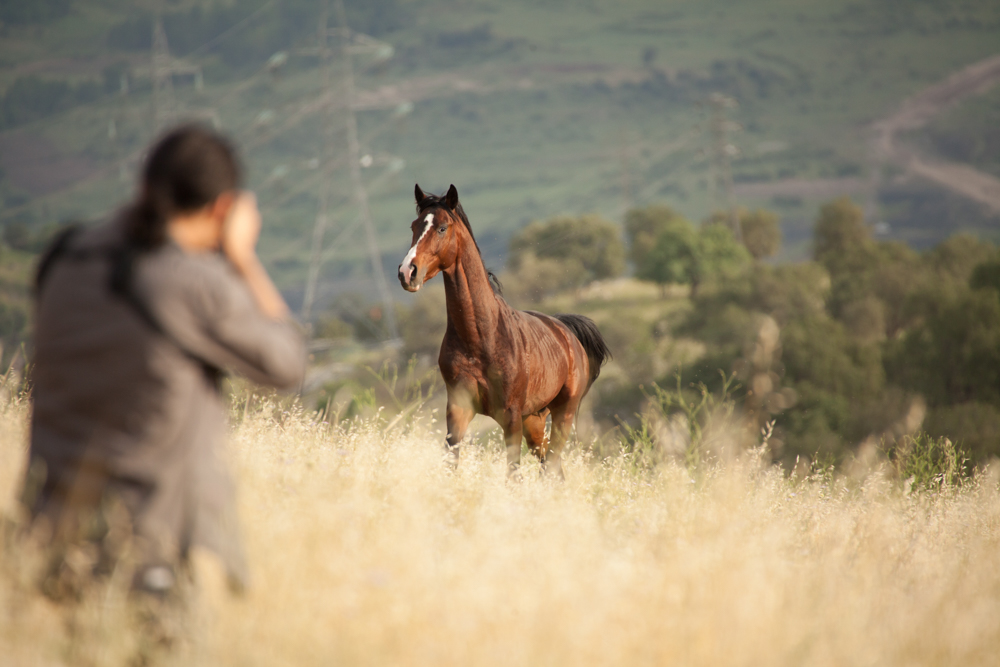
Ahmad at work

He also delivers lectures and workshops on equine photography, focusing on the characteristics of horses and offering practical guidance on the technicalities of photographing them and constructing a narrative around the artwork.

He predominantly captures horses without tack, halters, saddles or any other accessories, as he believes that "freedom" is one of their most prominent characteristics.

=== People, portraits and street photography ===
Ahmad approaches portraiture from two distinct perspectives. The first concerns the shared characteristics of ethnic groups, lifestyles or adherents of a particular ideology. A unifying thread links each group, whether expressed through psychology, philosophy or a way of living. The long hair and beards of Sikh men, the extra-long moustaches of Yazidi men, the intense gaze of Arab Bedouins, and the female followers of a particular fashion trend all belong to this category.

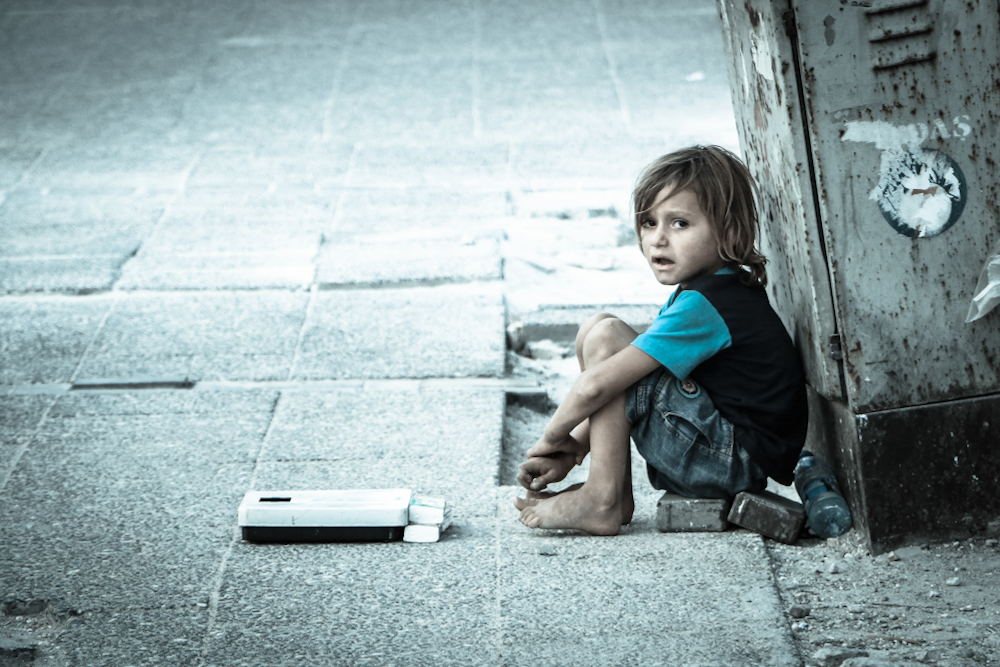
A Syrian Refugee

The second perspective focuses on the unique features that distinguish an individual from the collective. To create his desired artworks in this realm, Ahmad employs a variety of framing, cropping and editing techniques to emphasise particular individualities within the photograph.

A Syrian Refugee is one of Ahmad's most prominent portraits. It has been published by the United Nations Regional Information Centre (UNIRC), a United Nations entity, as well as by ABC News, The London Magazine, HuffPost and Humanium.

== Awards and distinctions ==
- GPU Crown 1 Distinction (Global Photographic Union)
- Gold Medal, Photographic Society of America (Indian Continental Circuit, 2018)
- Gold Medal, Photographic Society of America (Indian Royal International Digital Circuit, 2018)
- Silver Medal, IRC (Indian Royal International Digital Circuit, 2018)
- Bronze Medal, Gradac PGI (9th International Salon of Photography Cacak, 2019)

== Gallery ==
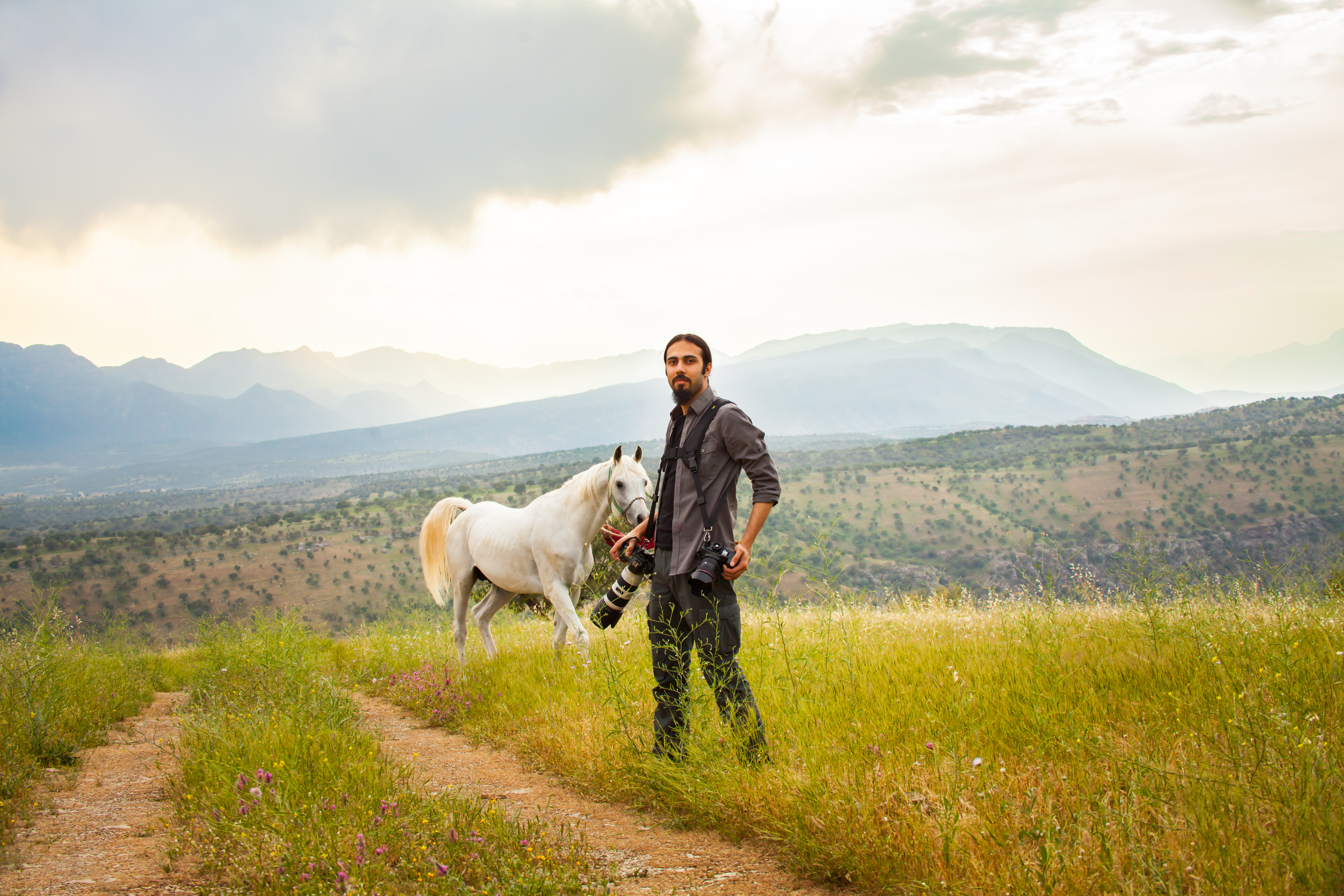
Ahmad during an equine photo shoot

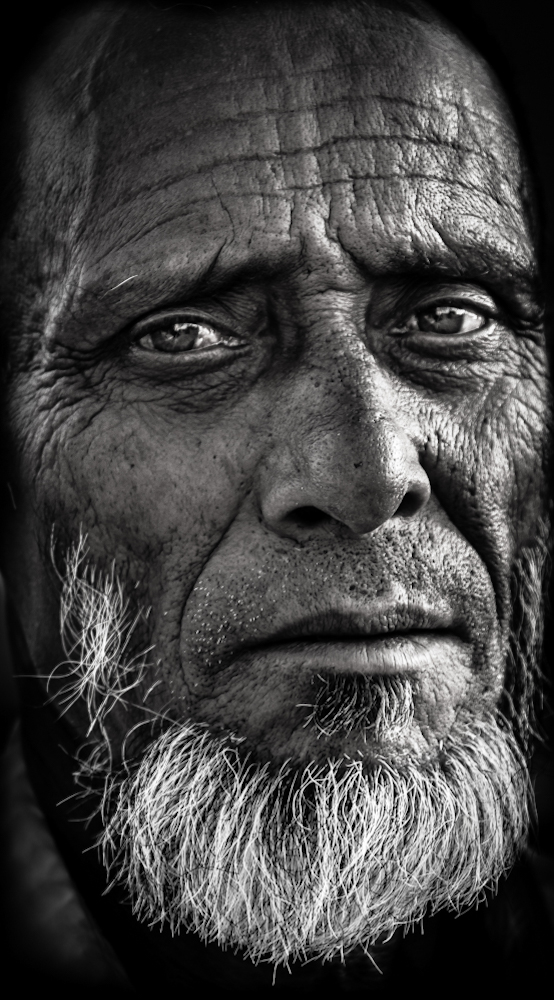
Wrinkles' Stories, portrait by Ahmad

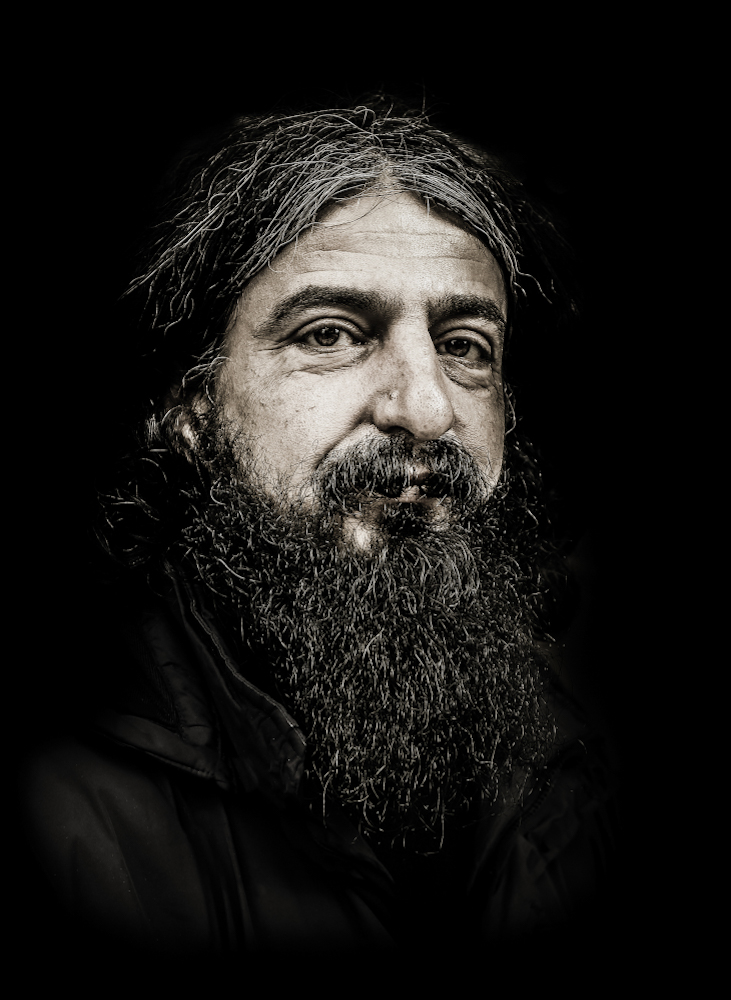
The Philosopher, portrait by Ahmad
