= Al-Hallaq =

Al-Hallaq (Arabic: الحلاق) is a surname of Arabic origin.

Notable people with the surname include:

- Boutros Al-Hallaq, Syrian politician
- Eyad al-Hallaq, Palestinian shooting victim

== See also ==
- Tahit Moos Al-Hallaq, Iraqi TV show
- Al Halaqah
