= Saudi Arabia–Syria relations =

- Saudi Arabia: Syria

Saudi Arabia–Syria relations refer to bilateral and economic relations between Saudi Arabia and Syria. Diplomatic ties between these two countries of the Middle East have long been strained by the major events in the region. Saudi Arabia has an embassy in Damascus, and Syria has an embassy in Riyadh. Both countries are members of the Arab League and share close cultural ties.

== Factors affecting relations ==
Sonoko Sunayama, a Middle East expert, argues that although economic concerns and balance of power are important, concerns about identity and ideology play the most significant role in the two countries' relations. Ian Black of The Guardian, on the other hand, states that Saudi foreign policy in general mostly focuses on business involving financial incentives and low-profile initiatives, which continued towards Syria until King Abdullah's high-profile condemnation of the Syrian government in 2011.

Both countries share Arab nationalist and Islamic identities. However, a significant element of their identity and government, namely secular versus conservative pattern, is completely different in that Syria had a secular government and life-style till 2024, while Saudi Arabia has a conservative government and world view.

== History of relations ==
The relations between two countries have been turbulent since their establishment as modern states.

=== 1940s through 1960s ===
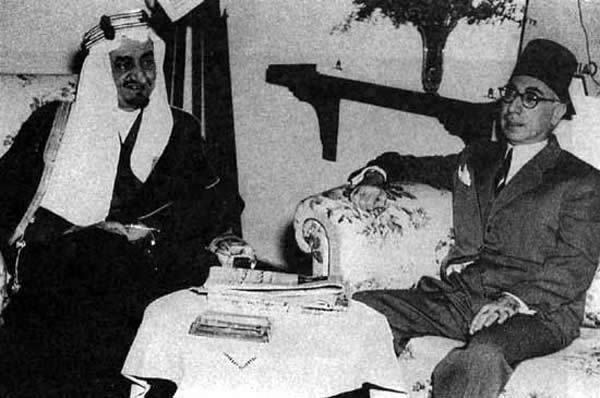
Syrian Foreign Minister Jamil Mardam Bey with Saudi Foreign Minister Prince (later king) Faisal, 1940s

A Syrian mission was opened in Saudi Arabia in 1941, when Syria was still under the control of the French Mandate. King Abdulaziz reportedly supported the independence of Syria and Lebanon from both the Hashemite dynasty and the French mandate. Syria recognized Saudi Arabia as a sovereign state in 1944. The King met Shukri Al Quwatli, the first president of independent Syria, on 17 February 1945 in Al Fayyum, Egypt. Both Saudi Arabia and Syria were founding members of the Arab League which was established in March 1945.

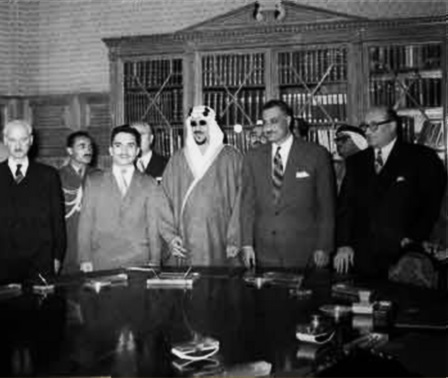
The signing of the Arab Defense Pact between Egypt, Saudi Arabia, Syria and Jordan in Cairo, 1957

Saudi Arabia supported the coup in Syria by Adib Shishakli in December 1950. Nevertheless, Saudi Arabia and Syria were in rival camps in the 1950s and 1960s, largely because of the policies of Egypt's leader Gamal Nasser and the Cold War. Syria supported Nasser's policies and allied itself with the USSR, while Saudi Arabia was among the opponents of Nasser's policies and was close to the United States. But in 1956, Syrian President Shukri Al Quwatli signed a defense agreement with Gamal Nasser and Saudi King Saud in Egypt. The agreement said that Syria, Egypt, and Saudi Arabia would safeguard Arab security and defend the Arab World against US-led Baghdad Pact. By 1958 this deterioration in the relationship had led to King Saud offering a bribe of £1.9 million to Abdel Hamid al-Sarraj, the head of Syrian intelligence at the time and later vice president of the United Arab Republic, to encourage the assassination of Nasser.

After the Ba'ath Party came to power in Syria in 1963, Syria's diplomatic relations with Saudi Arabia again became tense. A left-wing faction of the Ba'ath Party, called the Neo-Ba'ath, led by Salah Jadid took over the government on 23 February 1966, and declared war against monarchist nations, including Saudi Arabia. On 3 May 1966, King Faisal cancelled all trade agreements with Syria. The Salah Jadid regime made no attempt to hide its militaristic and interventionist nature towards Saudi Arabia – for example, Syrian Prime Minister Yusuf Zuayyin said that the days of the Saudi sheikhs were numbered.

=== 1970s and 1980s ===
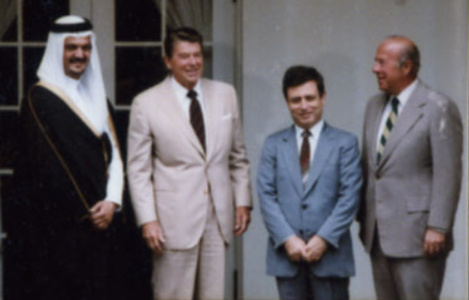
Syrian Foreign Minister Khaddam with Saudi Arabian Foreign Minister Prince Saud, Ronald Reagan and George Shultz in 1982

At the end of November 1970, Syria's Neo-Ba'ath leaders were toppled and removed, and Hafez al-Assad became ruler of Syria. Diplomatic negotiations between the two countries were opened and renewed. With the death of Nasser in 1970, relations improved further.

Three months before the joint attacks by Egyptian and Syrian forces on Israeli forces in the Sinai and the Golan Heights, Egyptian President Anwar Sadat and Syrian President Hafez al-Assad visited King Faisal in Riyadh in August 1973. In turn, King Faisal visited Damascus in 1974 and persuaded the US Secretary of State Henry Kissinger to include Syria as a key participant in any Arab–Israeli negotiations. King Khalid, successor of King Faisal, stated in 1975 that Saudi Arabia supported the Syrian role in the Lebanese civil war. Hafez al-Assad participated in the Riyadh summit held in 1976.

Syria's alliance with the Islamic Republic of Iran in the Iran–Iraq War again strained relations at the beginning of the 1980s. Syria's Assad paid a visit to Riyadh on 22 December 1981. When King Fahd became the ruler of Saudi Arabia in 1982 he developed a special bond with Assad that continued throughout his reign. In October 1989, both countries actively supported the Taif agreement that reestablished Lebanon's political system and ended the civil war in Lebanon.

=== 1990s ===
The relations between Saudi Arabia and Syria were positive in the 1990s. Following the invasion of Kuwait by the Iraqi president Saddam Hussein in August 1990, Syria took part in the US-led international coalition that was established to defend Saudi Arabia and liberate Kuwait.

=== 2000s ===
Four months after Bashar al-Assad succeeded his father as Syrian president, he visited Saudi Arabia in October 2000 and met King Fahd. It was his second state visit, after Egypt.

The assassination of Lebanese Prime Minister Rafik Hariri, an ally of Saudi Arabia, in Beirut on 14 February 2005 adversely affected relations. The Israel-Lebanon war in 2006 further damaged relations since Syria overtly supported Hezbollah, which had been blamed for starting the war.

Relations between Saudi Arabia and Syria began to become strained in August 2008 when Saudi Arabian ambassador was called back to Riyadh and then withdrawn in protest over Syrian forces' crackdown on anti-government demonstrators. In addition, King Abdullah boycotted the Arab League's summit held in Damascus in 2008.

In a start of rapprochement between the two countries, Saudi Arabia appointed an ambassador to Syria, Abdullah Al Eifan, on 25 August 2009. Bashar al-Assad visited Riyadh in September 2009, and in October, King Abdullah visited Assad in Damascus. Syria appointed a new ambassador, Mahdi Dakhlallah, to Saudi Arabia the same month, restoring diplomatic relations. By January 2010, Assad had visited Saudi Arabia three times.

=== 2010s and Syrian Civil War ===
The Syrian Civil War, which began in 2011, damaged relations between the two countries, due to Saudi Arabia sending weapons to the opposition forces, while Iran sent arms to the Syrian government and allied forces. Saudi King Abdullah was the first Arab leader to condemn the Assad government in August 2011 "due to its method to deal with the anti-government" demonstrations."

As a result of these events, Saudi Arabia withdrew its delegation from the Arab League's peacekeeping mission in Syria on 22 January 2012 and closed its embassy in Damascus in February expelling the Syrian ambassador.

Relations between both countries deteriorated further following the start of the Syrian Civil War and Saudi Arabia's numerous calls for Assad to be ousted from power. Since the summer of 2013, Saudi Arabia has emerged as the main group to finance and arm the rebels further distancing itself from the Syrian government.

In 2013, Najdat Anzour, a famous Syrian director, produced a film, King of the Sands, which presents very negative views about House of Saud and the founder of Saudi Arabia, King Abdulaziz. Although Saudi authorities demanded the ban of the movie, it was released in London on 11 September 2013. Anzour stated that the date was a reference to the Saudis' support for terrorism. The movie that was also shown at the Damascus Opera House in December 2013 further worsened the ties between two countries.

In August 2017, the Saudi foreign minister, Adel Jubeir, informed the Syrian opposition at a summit in Riyadh that Saudi Arabia was disengaging with them.

In March 2018, Mohammad bin Salman, the Crown Prince of Saudi Arabia, said in an interview that "Bashar al-Assad is staying, but I believe that Bashar's interests is not to let the Iranians do whatever they want to do." This was interpreted as a break from the previous Saudi insistence that Assad leave office. However, he also stated his opposition to withdrawal of U.S. Special Operations forces from eastern Syria, which is under the control of the Syrian Democratic Forces (SDF) rather than the Assad government. A few weeks later, Jubair indicated the country was open towards deploying its own troops in eastern Syria.

Saudi Arabia has provided support for the SDF, and has met in May 2018 with SDF officials to expand military ties. On 26 August 2018, Lebanese MP Nawwaf Moussawi claimed that Assad rejected an offer by Prince Mohammad of Saudi Arabia to provide reconstruction aid in exchange for Syria cutting its ties with Iran and Hezbollah.

On 29 August 2018, Jubeir stated at a joint press conference with Russian foreign minister Sergey Lavrov that Saudi Arabia would work with Russia in bringing about a political solution to the Syrian Civil War. His remarks were welcomed by Syrian foreign minister Walid Muallem, who praised "the new language used to determine Saudi Arabia’s position". In November 2018, it was reported that Saudi Arabia and Syria were negotiating a political reconciliation, with the United Arab Emirates as an intermediary. The talks included potential future cooperation against the Muslim Brotherhood in the region.

In January 2019, the Saudi foreign ministry denied a report that it would be immediately reopening its embassy in Damascus, following decisions by the UAE and Bahrain to reopen respective embassies there. In February 2019, it was reported that Russia was launching a focused lobbying effort on Saudi Arabia and three other Arab countries to support the readmission of Syria to the Arab League, and that Saudi Arabia was seeking assurances that Russia would reduce Iranian political influence in Syria as a prerequisite for doing so.

Since February 2019, Syrian state media ceased criticism of Saudi Arabia, focusing instead on Qatar and Turkey as threats, while Saudi foreign minister Faisal bin Farhan Al Saud avoided criticising Syria in his speeches since his appointment in October 2019.

=== 2020s ===
In May 2021, the Syrian Minister of Tourism Mohammad Rami Radwan Martini visited Riyadh on invitation from the Ministry of Tourism of Saudi Arabia and the World Tourism Organization. In the same month Saudi intelligence chief Khalid bin Ali Al Humaidan visited Damascus and met with his Syrian counterpart Ali Mamlouk, the first such meeting since the outbreak of the civil war. They later met a second time in November of that year in Cairo during the Arab Intelligence Forum. In June 2021, an Al Jazeera report quoted Syrian opposition figures as stating that senior Saudi officials, including Crown Prince Mohammad bin Salman, were "keen to reengage with Assad" and had started rapprochement talks.

In December 2021, the Saudi Ambassador to the United Nations urged the UN not to believe Syrian claims that the war was over and condemned the Syrian government's association with Hezbollah and Shia militias. Subsequently, Syrian Deputy Foreign Minister Bashar Jaafari named Saudi Arabia, alongside Qatar, as a country obstructing a Syrian return to the Arab League. In September 2022, Daily Sabah reported Saudi Arabia had set conditions for the return of Syria to the Arab League, including distancing itself from Iran and Hezbollah.

In January 2023, Syria resumed imports from Saudi Arabia. In March 2023, Saudi Arabia began talks to bring Syria back into the Arab League, and provided economic support after the earthquake on 6 February. On 23 March 2023, Saudi Arabia and Syria began discussing restoration of diplomatic relations.

==== Normalisation of relations ====
On 13 April 2023, Syrian Foreign Minister Faisal Mekdad arrived in Jeddah to meet Saudi Foreign Minister Faisal bin Farhan. After frayed relations during the Syrian civil war, both nations now seek "a political solution to the Syrian crisis that preserves the unity, security and stability of Syria,” according to the Saudi foreign ministry. This was the first visit to Saudi Arabia by a Syrian foreign minister since 2011. On 18 April, Saudi Foreign Minister Faisal bin Farhan met President Bashar al-Assad in Damascus, to be the first Saudi official to visit the country since the emergence of the civil war in 2011.

On 9 May 2023, Saudi Arabia decided to resume work of its diplomatic mission in Syria, which had been suspended since November 2011. On the same day, Syria has decided to resume the work of its diplomatic mission in Saudi Arabia. On 10 May 2023, Syrian state media reported that Saudi King Salman bin Abdulaziz had invited Syrian President Bashar al-Assad to the 2023 Arab League summit in Jeddah on 19 May. On the sidelines of the summit President Bashar al-Assad met with Crown Prince Mohammed bin Salman, and they discussed improving bilateral relations and developments in the Arab arena.

As of March 2024, the Saudi Embassy in Damascus was not yet opened, after previously announcing intention to reopen in mid-February. In May 2024, Saudi Arabia appointed its first Ambassador to Syria since 2012. Later that year, on 10 September, Saudi Arabia officially opened its embassy in Damascus, completing the normalization with Syria.

==== Post-Assad relations ====
After the fall of the Assad regime, Syria's new de facto leader, Ahmed al-Sharaa, expressed appreciation for Saudi Arabia's support for "Syria's Future", signaling the potential for strong ties between the two nations. On the other hand, the Saudi Ministry of Foreign Affairs welcomed the fall of Assad, expressing its "satisfaction with the positive steps" in Syria. Meanwhile, the King Salman Humanitarian Aid and Relief Center delivered 350 tonnes of aid, bringing Saudi Arabia's total historic assistance to Syria to over 7 billion dollars. The foreign minister of the Syrian transitional government, Asaad Hassan al-Shaybani, made his first official visit abroad in that role to Saudi Arabia on 1 January 2025.

Meetings on Syria were hosted by Riyadh on 12–13 January 2025 to discuss the future of various issues in Syria post-Assad. The meetings were attended by foreign ministers of GCC countries, and of Syria, Iraq, Lebanon, Jordan, Egypt, Turkey, United Kingdom, Germany, Spain, and deputy foreign ministers of the United States and Italy, as well as officials from the Arab League, United Nations, and European Union. Later that month, on 24 January, Saudi Foreign Minister Faisal bin Farhan visited Damascus, following discussions with the U.S. and Europe about lifting sanctions on Syria. During his visit, he conveyed Saudi Arabia's support for Syria's recovery and stability, signaling a shift toward normalizing relations. On 2 February, Syrian President al-Sharaa and foreign minister Asaad al-Shaibani visited Saudi Arabia. It was his first official trip abroad since the fall of the Assad regime. During the visit, he met with Crown Prince Mohammed bin Salman.

In April 2025, Saudi Arabia increased its engagement with Syria by planning to pay off Syria's $15 million debt to the World Bank, potentially allowing Syria to receive grants for reconstruction efforts under its new government led by Ahmed al-Sharaa, who seized power in December 2024. The international community is cautiously observing al-Sharaa's government, particularly regarding its commitment to protecting religious minorities, though this move by Saudi Arabia signals a new level of diplomatic and economic engagement with the Syrian government after years of strained relations. Additionally, other Gulf Arab states have announced plans to support Syria as well. In February 2026, a Saudi economic delegation arrived in Damascus to sign a number of economic agreements with the Syrian government covering sectors such as aviation, telecommunications, infrastructure services, and real estate development, marking a further step in expanding bilateral economic cooperation.

== Economic ties ==
One of the early economic relations between Saudi Arabia and Syria was in 1950 when a trade agreement was signed and Saudi Arabia provided Syria with financial support. It followed other trade agreements, but all of them were cancelled by King Faisal on 3 May 1966 due to hostile attitude of the Neo-Ba'ath government in Syria towards Saudi Arabia. On 4 April 1972, the two countries signed another trade and economic agreement. It allowed free imports and exports of local products between two countries without customs fees for agricultural products, livestock and natural resources. Following the Syrian support for the coalition in the war against the invasion of Kuwait, Syria was provided with nearly $2.2-2.6 billion in aid by Kuwait and Saudi Arabia. In February 1991, a joint committee was formed by Saudi Arabia and Syria, and it fostered economic cooperation between the countries.

In 1997, Syrian exports to Saudi Arabia included mostly livestock, fruits, vegetables, textiles and furniture of which overall cost was over 602 million Riyals. Major items exported by Saudi Arabia to Syria were crude oil and its by products, plant oil and dates, and the 1997 cost of them was nearly 262 million Riyals. In addition, Saudi Arabia had private investments in Syria with a cost of US$700 million in the same year. The number of joint projects was around 50.

Syria and Saudi Arabia signed an accord on 20 February 2001 to set up a free trade area. In December 2001, the two countries and Jordan signed a memorandum of understanding concerning the construction of a railway link to be used by all three for commercial purposes. Later both countries joined the Greater Arab Free Trade Area (GAFTA).

In parallel to tense diplomatic relations in 2008, both countries began to put taxes on each other's products, but, taxes were ended in 2009. Unofficial figure for the 2007 annual Saudi investment in Syria was $750m and it increased to $1 billion in 2009. On 6 and 7 March 2010 Saudi-Syrian Business Forum and the 11th Session of the Syrian-Saudi Joint Committee were held in Damascus. Five cooperation agreements were signed during the events.

By 2021, Saudi Arabia's share of Syrian exports was 30.9%, making it Syria's main export partner. In 2021, Saudi Arabia became the sixth largest import partner of Syria with a share of almost 2%.

== See also ==
- Foreign relations of Saudi Arabia
- Foreign relations of Syria
- Syrians in Saudi Arabia
