= Adnan Hassan Mahmoud =

Syrian government official and ambassador

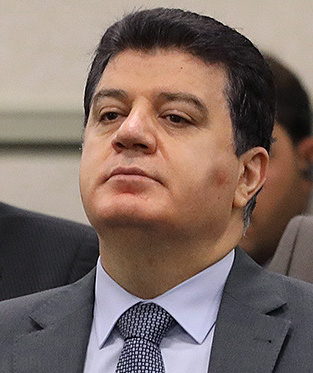

Syrian Ambassador to Iran
- In office December 2012 – 2020
- Preceded by: Hamid Hassan
- Succeeded by: Shafiq Dayoub

Minister of Information
- In office 14 April 2011 – 23 June 2012
- President: Bashar al-Assad
- Prime Minister: Adel Safar
- Preceded by: Mohsen Bilal
- Succeeded by: Omran al-Zoubi

Personal details
- Born: 1966 (age 59–60) Tartus, Syria
- Children: three
- Education: University of Damascus (B.A), University of Cairo (M.A, PhD)

Adnan Hassan Mahmoud (Arabic: عدنان حسن محمود, born 1966) is the former minister of information of Syria, and late ambassador to Iran.

== Early life and education ==
Mahmoud was born in Tartus in 1966. He earned a bachelor's degree in media arts from the University of Damascus in 1988 and master's degree in public information at the department of information of the University of Cairo in 1996 and a PhD in media again from the University of Cairo in 2003.

== Career ==
Mahmoud was a faculty member at the department of media of Damascus University. He participated in several Arab and international conferences and symposia, specialized media, and provided research and applied studies and worked as a reporter for radio and television and director of the office of the tongue in Egypt from 1996 to 2002. He was general manager and chief editor of the Syrian Arab News Agency from 2004 until his appointment as information minister in April 2006. He succeeded Mohsen Bilal as minister. After leaving office, Mahmoud was appointed Syria's ambassador to Iran in December 2012.

=== Sanctions ===
Mahmoud was sanctioned by the United Kingdom on 2 August 2011, targeting his financial assets in the country. The European Union also sanctioned him on 23 September 2011, stating he was "associated with the Syrian regime, including by supporting and promoting its information policy."

== Personal life ==
Mahmoud is married with three children.

Political offices
Preceded by Mohsen Bilal	Minister of Information of Syria; 2011-2012	Succeeded by Omran al-Zoubi
