= Syria–United Kingdom relations =

- Syria: United Kingdom

Syria–United Kingdom relations refers to the bilateral relations between the Syrian Arab Republic and the United Kingdom of Great Britain and Northern Ireland.

During the Syrian civil war, the United Kingdom supported the Syrian opposition. The United Kingdom closed its embassy in Syria in 2012, and the Embassy of Syria, London was closed the following year. After the fall of the Assad regime, the resumption of relations was announced in July 2025.

== History ==
=== 20th century ===
==== World War I and Deir ez-Zor occupation ====
During World War I, the United Kingdom played a significant role in the Allied victory in Syria, collaborating with Arab Sharifian Army during the Arab Revolt, which was supported by British Army officer T. E. Lawrence. This partnership helped secure major victories, including the capture of Damascus in 1918.

Following the war, the implementation of the Sykes-Picot Agreement shaped the division of the region, granting Britain influence outside Syria. On 11 January 1919, British forces occupied Deir ez-Zor, annexing it to Iraq. However, local resistance, supported by Iraqi officers and tribes, culminated in the city's liberation on 27 December 1919, as British troops withdrew to Iraq.

==== World War II and Levant Crisis ====
In 1941, the British launched the Syria-Lebanon Campaign to counter Vichy French influence in the region, fearing it could bolster Axis powers. British troops, alongside Free French forces and Commonwealth allies, successfully invaded Syria and Lebanon, driving out Vichy French forces and establishing control under the Free French government.

The British later became involved in the Levant Crisis of 1945, as tensions between the French and Syrians escalated. When French forces bombarded Damascus in May 1945 to suppress growing independence movements, the British intervened militarily, pressuring the French to withdraw. This intervention paved the way for Syrian independence and the end of French colonial rule, solidifying Britain's role in shaping the region's post-war order.

==== 1950s ====
On 6 November 1956, during the Suez Crisis, a Royal Air Force Canberra PR.7 was sent to overfly Syria on a photo reconnaissance mission, and was shot down by a Syrian Air Force Gloster Meteor. As of 2022, this was the last RAF aircraft shot down in an enemy air-to-air engagement.

=== 21st century ===
==== Ba'athist Syria ====
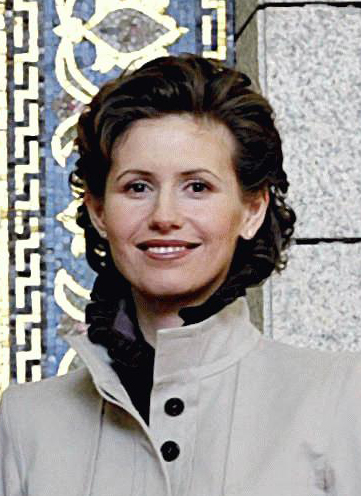
Former First Lady of Syria Asma al-Assad was born and raised in England.

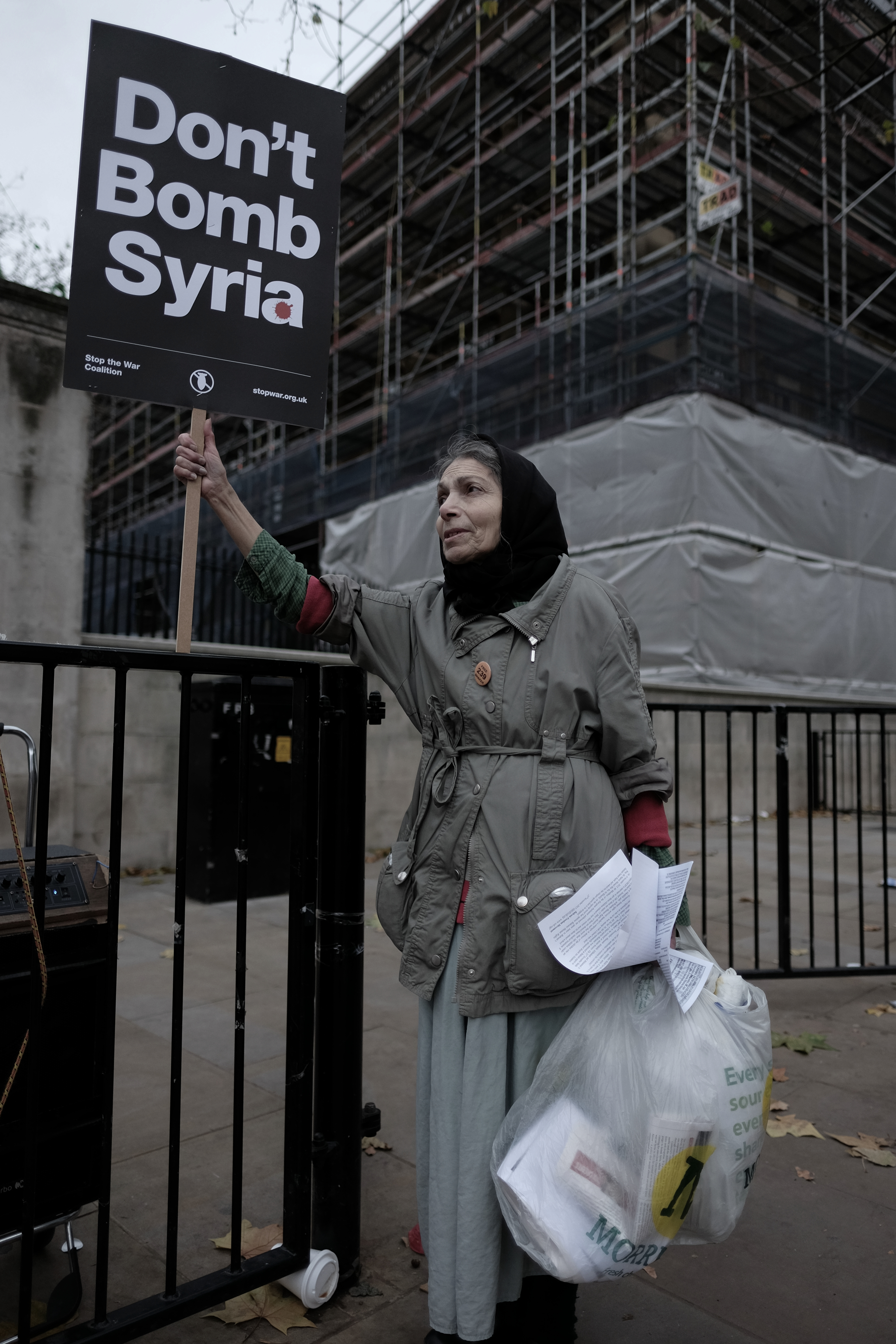
A pro-Assad demonstrator holds up a "Don't bomb Syria" sign during a protest in London in November 2015.

In 2001, positive relations were developed between Prime Minister Tony Blair and the Syrian government, as part of the war on terror.

In 2002, President Bashar al-Assad made an official visit to the United Kingdom, the first Syrian leader to do so. He and his wife Asma met with Queen Elizabeth II.

In 2003, the British Syrian Society was established in London by Fawaz Akhras, father-in-law of Bashar al-Assad.

==== Syrian civil war (2011–2024) ====
Since the emergence of Syrian civil war in 2011, relations have deteriorated, and the UK was one of the first countries to recognise the opposition as the sole legitimate representative of the Syrian people. The Embassy of Syria in London closed in 2013.

In 2018, the UK took part in the missile strikes against Syria alongside the United States and France.

In March 2021, the British Government placed sanctions on key allies of Assad.

==== Post-Assad regime (2024–present) ====
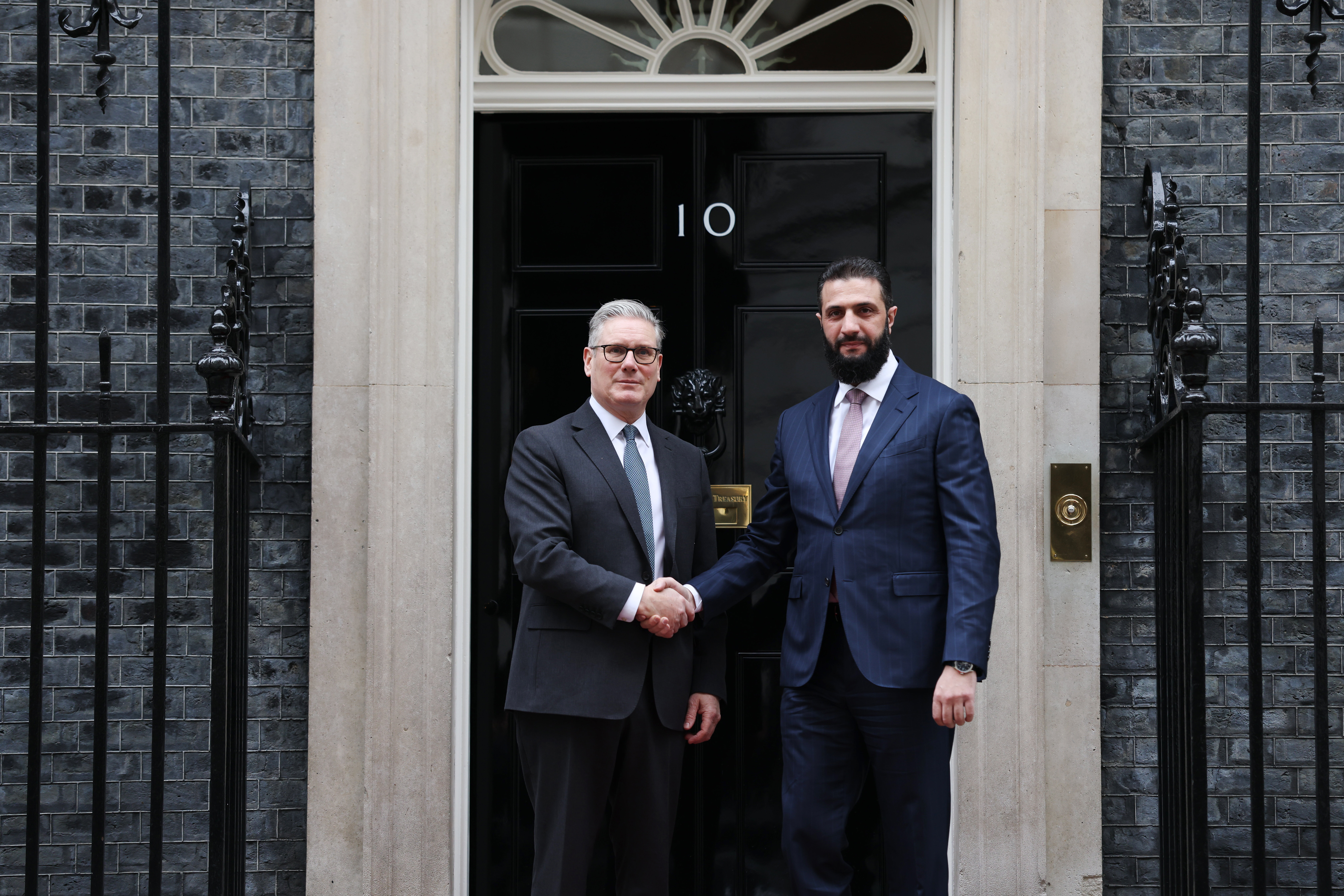
Prime Minister Keir Starmer met Syrian President Ahmed al-Sharaa at Downing Street, 31 March 2026

British prime minister Keir Starmer and foreign secretary David Lammy welcomed the fall of the Assad regime on 8 December 2024. A week later, the UK announced a £50 million aid package to support food, shelter, healthcare, and restoring essential services in Syria.

In January 2025, the UK took part in the Riyadh meetings on Syria, which focused on addressing the ongoing situation in Syria and exploring measures to promote stability in the country. During the meetings, UK Foreign Secretary David Lammy held talks with Syrian Foreign Minister Asaad al-Shaibani. Two months later, the United Kingdom pledged an additional £160 million to Syria for aid.

On 24 April 2025, the UK lifted sanctions on several Syrian government agencies, including the Ministry of the Interior, the Ministry of Defense, and the General Intelligence Service, as well as the police, air force, military, and state-run media.

On 5 July 2025, British foreign secretary Lammy announced that relations would be reestablished during a visit to Damascus. In addition, the United Kingdom pledged £94.5 million to provide urgent humanitarian aid, support Syria's long-term recovery, and assist neighboring countries hosting Syrian refugees. The Syrian embassy in London was reopened on 13 November 2025.

On 31 March 2026, Syrian President Ahmed al-Sharaa met UK Prime Minister Keir Starmer in London to discuss cooperation, security, and reconstruction. The following day, he was received by King Charles III at Buckingham Palace, in a symbolic step reflecting renewed engagement between the United Kingdom and Syria. Al-Sharaa became the first Syrian head of state to visit London since former president Bashar al-Assad visited the United Kingdom in 2002.

== See also ==
- Foreign relations of Syria
- Foreign relations of the United Kingdom
- List of Ambassadors from the United Kingdom to Syria
- Operation Shader
- Syrians in the United Kingdom
- William Hague § Syria

== Sources ==
- Coulthard-Clark, Chris (1998). Where Australians Fought: The Encyclopaedia of Australia's Battles (1st ed.). St Leonards, New South Wales: Allen & Unwin. ISBN 1-86448-611-2.
- Falls, Cyril (1930). Military Operations: Egypt & Palestine from June 1917 to the End of the War. Official History of the Great War Based on Official Documents by Direction of the Historical Section of the Committee of Imperial Defence: Volume 2 Part II. A. F. Becke (maps). London: HM Stationery Office. OCLC 256950972.
- Moubayed, Sami (2013). Syria and the USA: Washington's Relations with Damascus from Wilson to Eisenhower Volume 56 of Library of international relations. I.B. Tauris. ISBN 9781780767680.
