= Muhsen Bilal =

Syrian politician (born 1944)

Muhsen Bilal محسن بلال
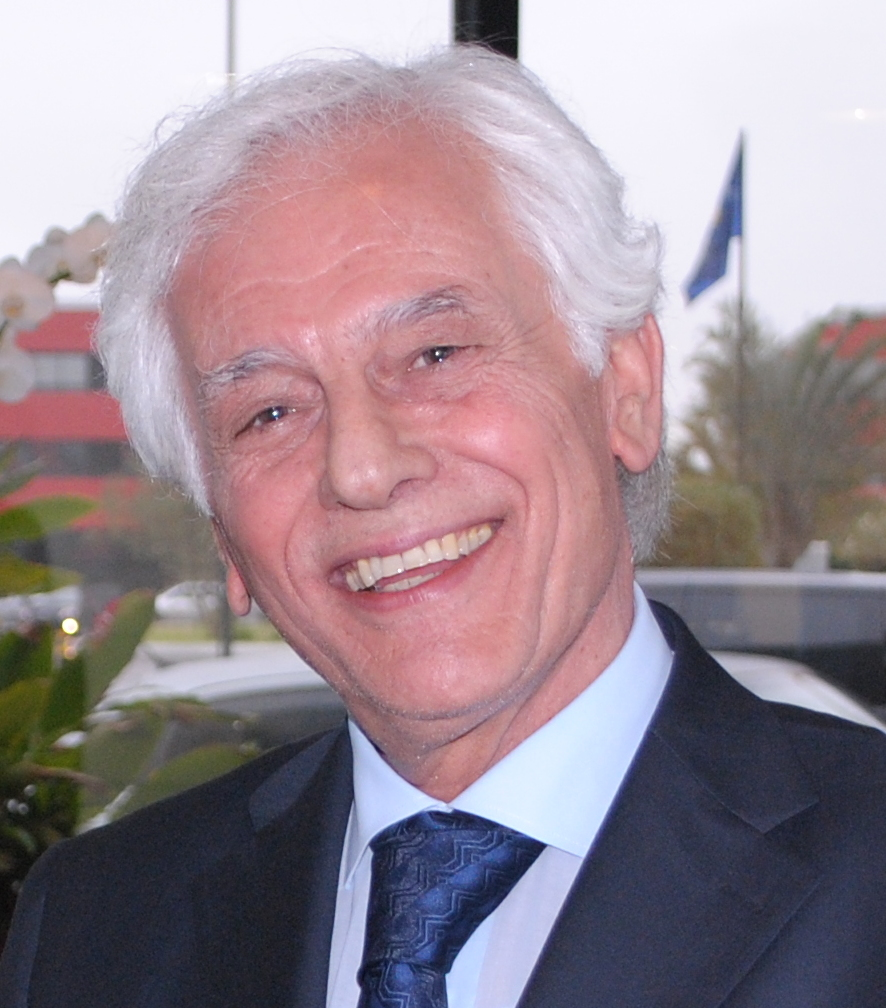
- Bilal in 2009.

Member of the Central Command of the Syrian Regional Branch of Baath Party
- In office 22 April 2017 – 4 May 2024

Minister of Information
- In office 21 February 2006 – 29 March 2011
- Prime Minister: Mohammad Naji Otari
- Preceded by: Mahdi Dakhlallah
- Succeeded by: Adnan Mahmoud

Personal details
- Born: 1944 (age 81–82) Burghalieh, Tartous Governorate, Syria
- Party: Ba'ath Party
- Education: University of Padua; University of Pennsylvania

Muhsen Bilal (Arabic: محسن بلال) (born 1944) is a Syrian surgeon, ambassador and Ba'athist politician.

== Early life and education ==
Bilal was born into a prominent Alawite family in Burghalieh, Tartus Governorate, in 1944. His father lived in Argentina between 1930 and 1936, where he worked as an Arabic teacher, teaching Arabic to the local Syrian community. He studied medicine at the University of Padua, graduating in 1970. In 1976, he specialized in surgery in Italy. Then he received his PhD in medicine and surgery from the University of Pennsylvania with the specialization in liver transplantation.

== Career ==
After graduation, Bilal became the head of surgery at the Al Assad University Hospital. He then served as a professor of surgery at the faculty of medicine at Damascus University from 1977 to 2001.

His political career started in 1977 when he was elected to the Peoples Assembly. In 1979, then-President Hafez al-Assad sent him to Argentina to petition dictator Jorge Rafael Videla regarding the disappeared Syrian-Argentine detainees. In 1981, he was named the chairman of the Arab and foreign affairs committee, and served in this position until 1985. He led the Syrian delegation at the 1982 World Peace Conference in Prague. In 2001, he became Syria's ambassador to Spain, and he held this post until he was appointed minister of information to the cabinet headed by then prime minister Mohammad Naji Otari in February 2006. He replaced Mahdi Dakhlallah as information minister. When Bilal was in office, he acted as chief spokesperson for the Syrian government during the Israel-Hezbollah war in 2006. In 2007 and 2010, he made two official tours of Latin America . On the first, he met with Presidents Néstor Kirchner (of Argentina), Hugo Chávez (of Venezuela), and Lula da Silva (of Brazil); and on the second, he visited Argentina, Uruguay, Bolivia, Brazil, and Venezuela. Bilal's term ended in April 2011 when he was succeeded by Adnan Mahmoud. Since then he has returned to teaching and is head of the medical degree committee at Damascus University.

=== Distinctions ===
On March 13, 2006, the Spanish government awarded him the Grand Cross of the Order of Isabella the Catholic. He has also been decorated by the governments of Italy and France.

== Personal life ==
Bilal speaks Arabic, English, Spanish, and Italian. Bilal married Dr. Faten Rustum, a prominent fellow doctor.
