= Adnan Omran =

Syrian diplomat and politician (born 1934)

Minister of Information
- In office 14 March 2000 – 10 September 2003
- President: Hafez al-Assad; Bashar al-Assad
- Prime Minister: Mohammad Mustafa Mero
- Preceded by: Mohammad Salman
- Succeeded by: Ahmad Hassan

Personal details
- Born: 1934 (age 91–92)
- Party: Syrian Regional Branch of the Arab Socialist Ba'ath Party
- Education: Syrian University; Columbia University

Adnan Omran (Arabic: عدنان عمران) (born 1934) is a Syrian diplomat and politician who served as information minister from 2000 to 2003.

== Early life and education ==
Omran was born in 1934. He holds a bachelor's degree in public law, which he received from Syrian University in Damascus in 1956. Then he obtained a diploma in Syrian private law. He also received a diploma in diplomatic studies and international law from Columbia University in New York City in 1964.

== Career ==
After graduation, Omran began to serve as a member of the permanent mission of Syria to the United Nations in 1964. Two years later he was named as first secretary of the Syrian Embassy in Moscow. His tenure ended in 1968, and he served as counsel general of the Syrian Arab Republic in Berlin until 1970. Next he was appointed director of the international organisations department and special offices at the Syrian foreign ministry. He served there until 1974. Then he was named as Syrian ambassador to the United Kingdom and then, to Sweden from 1974 to 1980.

Omran began to assume political positions in 1980. His first political post was assistant secretary general for political affairs, which he held until 1996. He represented Syria and the League of Arab States at various international conferences and also, committees of the United Nations. He also held the post of the Arab League assistant secretary general during this period. In 1996, Omran was appointed deputy foreign minister and served in this post until 1998. He was a member of the Ba'ath Party's central committee in 2000.

He was appointed minister of information on 14 March 2000 to the cabinet headed by Prime Minister Muhammad Mustafa Mero under Hafez al-Assad. Omran replaced Mohammad Salman as information minister. Omran's appointment raised hopes that Syrian media would be given more liberty. However, on 29 January 2001, Omran argued that the term civil society was developed by the US and that its meaning was modified by the opposition groups in Syria in an attempt to form political parties. He continued to serve as information minister after the first cabinet reshuffle by Bashar al-Assad when he became the president. In September 2003, Mero resigned from office, and Mohammad Naji Al Otari formed a new cabinet. Omran was replaced by Ahmad Hassan as information minister on 10 September 2003.

Omran was named as a member of the Committee of Patrons of the Anglo-Arab Organisation in January 2003. As of 2008 he was secretary general of the Arab Parliament.

Political offices
Preceded by Mohammad Salman	Minister of Information; 2000 – 2003	Succeeded by Ahmad Hassan
