= International sanctions against Syria =

Embargo imposed by the United States and other countries during the Syrian Civil War

International sanctions against Syria were a series of economic sanctions and restrictions imposed on the Syrian Arab Republic under Bashar al-Assad's rule from 2011 onwards by the European Union, the United States, the United Kingdom, Canada, Australia, Switzerland, and the Arab League, mainly as a result of the repression of civilians in the Syrian civil war. The US sanctions against Syria were the most severe, as they affected third-parties as well, and amounted to an embargo. The intent was to prevent the Syrian government from employing violence against its citizens and to motivate political reforms that could solve the root causes of the conflict.

In May 2025, US president Donald Trump and the European Union ordered the lifting of sanctions on Syria following the fall of the Assad regime in December 2024. In December 2025, majority of the US sanctions were permanently lifted with the repeal of the Caesar Act.

== Sanctions timeline ==
In 1979, the United States put Syria on the list of State Sponsors of Terrorism over Syria's military occupation of Lebanon and state-sponsored support to Hezbollah, and other terrorist groups.

In November 1986, the European Community (EC) imposed a package of sanctions that included a ban on the sale of new arms to Syria, a ban on high-level visits, review of embassy and consular staff, and strict security measures with regard to Syrian Arab Airlines. These measures were lifted in 1994.

Between March and August 2004, the United States issued new sanctions against the Syrian government. These new sanctions are a follow-up to the policy of combating the Axis of evil conducted by the Bush administration, which "condemns the alleged possession of weapons of mass destruction by the Syrian regime, condemns its grip on Lebanon and its willingness to destabilize Iraq, as well as its support for terrorist organizations such as Hezbollah and Hamas."

The first sanctions applied on the country after the outbreak of the crisis was on 29 April 2011, after an executive order was issued by President Barack Obama to block property of those involved in the violations. Canada imposed its first sanctions on 25 May 2011 in the form of a travel ban, asset freeze, ban on the export of certain goods and technology that may be used by the armed forces, and suspension of all bilateral agreements and initiatives.

In May 2011, the European Union adopted sanctions against Syria, in particular by prohibiting the trade in goods that could be used for the repression of the civilian population.

=== Sanctions following the civil war ===
In August 2011, the United States put in place an embargo on the oil sector, freezing the financial assets of a number of personalities, as well as those of the Syrian state itself. In addition, the United States prohibits the export of goods and services originating in the territory of the United States or from United States companies or persons to Syria. This prohibition concerns any product of which at least 10% of the value comes from the United States or one of its nationals. This measure has a wide impact on the Syrian population and on the price of commodities and medical products.

In September 2011, the European Union, in turn, adopted an embargo against the Syrian oil sector.

Australia announced a set of sanctions against Syria in 2011, in response to Assad government's violence against civilians. Sanctions ban Australians from all transactions related to weaponry, oil & natural gas, precious metals, petro-chemicals, toxic substances, banking partnerships, etc. with firms operating in Syria. They also prohibit dealings with regime-affiliated individuals, organizations and designated militant groups; which are involved in war-crimes and human rights violations.

In November 2011, the Arab League announced in turn the freezing of Syrian government's financial assets, the end of financial exchanges with the Central Bank of Syria, the cessation of airlines between the countries of the Arab League and Syria, the ban on the stay of several Syrian figures and the cessation of investments in Syria by the Arab League states. Lebanon and Yemen have opposed these sanctions. In the same month, Turkey also announced the freezing of the Syrian state's financial assets.

Other sanctions measures were put in place by the European Union in February 2012 concerning the energy sector, the supply of arms and the financial sector of Syria, as well as the mining sector. US presidential orders 13606 and 13608 issued in April and May 2012, respectively, issued additional sanctions against foreign individuals and firms trying to evade the US sanctions. In June 2012, several non-EU countries like Georgia, Croatia, Macedonia, Montenegro, Iceland, Serbia, Albania, Liechtenstein, Norway and Moldova also joined the European Union's sanctions against Syria.

In addition, in 2012, 120 Syrian officials or institutions had their financial assets frozen by the European Union and cannot travel to the European Union. This includes Bashar al-Assad, the Central Bank of Syria and several ministers. In June 2012, the European Union banned the trade in luxury goods with Syria, as well as a number of commercial products. At the same time, the European Union strengthened its measures of restrictions on Syria in the fields of armaments, law enforcement and telecommunications control sectors.

However, several EU member states have received sanctioned Syrian ministers in their lands, under the guise of attending UN and intergovernmental conferences since 2018.

In March 2017, a UN Security Council draft resolution aimed to establish sanctions against Syria following the use of chemical weapons in its territory. However, Russia and China vetoed it. It is the 7th draft resolution for sanctions that have been rejected as a result of the exercise of vetoes. The resolution envisaged prohibiting the trade in helicopter parts and setting up the freezing of financial assets of some military figures from the Syrian government.

In April 2017, the United States imposed financial freeze and travel ban to financial services against 270 government employees of the Syrian government following the Khan Sheikhoun attack.

In March 2021, the EU declared that sanctions would remain in place until a political transformation in Syria commences. On 31 May 2022, the EU extended its sanctions against the Syrian government for a further year. Following Assad's backing of Russian invasion of Ukraine and recognition of the separatist republics of Donetsk and Luhansk, Ukraine dissolved all diplomatic relations with Syria and pledged to expand further sanctions against Syria in June 2022.

==== After the 2023 Turkey–Syria earthquake ====
There were increasing calls for sanctions against Syria to be lifted after the 2023 Turkey–Syria earthquakes due to its impact on humanitarian aid. The US later temporarily lifted some sanctions which allowed many charity organizations to send money to Syria.

On 7 February 2023, in the wake of the Turkey–Syria earthquakes, the Syrian Arab Red Crescent urged Western countries to lift sanctions. According to the Century Foundation's Aaron Lund, NGOs want some sanctions lifted because they "hurt civilians and humanitarian efforts".

On 9 February 2023, the US Treasury Department announced it would temporarily lift some sanctions, covering “all transactions related to earthquake relief”, for 180 days. Previously, the US said the sanctions already contained robust exemptions for humanitarian assistance, and they "will not stand in the way" of saving lives.

On 23 February 2023, the European Union also announced it would ease some sanctions for six months in order to speed up the relief effort for the Syrian nation. Later a number of neighboring Arab states also signaled increased cooperation with Syria after they contributed to the relief effort.

During the 2023 Munich security conference, Prince Faisal bin Farhan Al Saud remarked that some dialogue would be necessary with Damascus, at least to address humanitarian issues, including a return of refugees, especially after the 2023 earthquake, and that "not just among the GCC (Gulf Cooperation Council) but in the Arab world there is a consensus growing that the status quo (to isolate Syria) is not workable”. At the same conference, Kuwaiti foreign minister Salem Abdullah Al-Jaber Al-Sabah told Reuters that his country was opposed to normalization with Bashar al-Assad and stated that Kuwait provided financial assistance to earthquake victims through international organisations and Turkey.

Following a visit to Syria by Jordan's foreign minister Ayman Safadi on 15 February 2023, members of the Jordanian government also expressed hope that Syria's isolation would end and sanctions could be lifted. A day earlier, China's envoy to the United Nations also called for unilateral sanctions to be lifted "to give children hit by war and quakes hopes for survival".

Qatar had been firmly opposed to normalisation of Bashar al-Assad due to regime's repression and has called for dialogue to end the crisis. Spokesman of Qatari Foreign Ministry stated on 28 February 2023 that they will not normalise relations with Syria until there is a "real political solution" in the country.

On 18 March 2023, National Security and Defense Council of Ukraine put into effect a range of sanctions targeting 141 firms and 300 individuals linked to Syria, including those affiliated with Russian weapons manufacturers and Iranian dronemakers. This was days after Assad's visit to Moscow, wherein he recognized Russian annexation of four Ukrainian Oblasts and portrayed Russia's war as a fight against "old and new Nazis". Bashar al-Assad, Prime Minister Hussein Arnous and Foreign Minister Faisal Mikdad were amongst the individuals who were sanctioned. Sanctions also involved freezing of all Syrian state properties in Ukraine, curtailment of monetary transactions, termination of economic commitments and recision of all state awards.

In late March 2023, Turkey also had taken the path of easing economic sanctions against Syria, as Erdogan is seeking a "bilateral normalization effort" with his Syrian counterpart Bashar Al-Assad, according to Le Monde. Earlier, US Secretary of State Antony Blinken and Turkish Foreign Minister Mevlüt Çavuşoğlu met in Ankara to seek a solution to the separatist-controlled north of Syria, an issue long at heart for the Republic of Türkiye.

==== Readmission of Syria to the Arab League ====
In early April 2023, Saudi Arabia had invited Syria's Assad to the Arab leaders summit. Saudi Foreign Minister Prince Faisal bin Farhan will travel to Damascus to discuss further steps to readmit Syria to the Arab League and reduce economic sanctions. The summit is scheduled for 19 May 2023. At the same time, Egypt was also in advanced talks with Bashar al-Assad when Egyptian Foreign Minister Sameh Shoukry met his Syrian counterpart in Cairo.

On 7 May 2023, Syria was readmitted to the Arab league after a vote in Cairo before the scheduled meeting in Saudi Arabia later that month. Earlier, Kuwait and Qatar had opposed al-Assad's presence at the Arab League summit. The regional normalization effort had caught the US and its European allies by surprise, as they were opposing an “Arab-led political path” in solving the crisis. According to the statement, al-Assad would be allowed to the meeting on 19 May 2023, if "he wishes to do so". Despite a critical stance by Jordan towards readmission of Syria to the alliance, the new political process was dubbed the “Jordanian Initiative”. Nevertheless, Syria remained under western sanctions after millions of Syrians had been displaced or sought refuge in Jordan and European countries during the civil war. The changes to the relations between Syria and other Arab States would allow many of them to return to their homeland, according to the announcements made earlier by Jordanian and Saudi officials. Later, Anwar Gargash, a diplomat from the United Arab Emirates, argued that the Assad's government failure to take advantage of this lifeline offered in 2023 by the Arab states was fundamental to its collapse in 2024.

==== Easing sanctions in Post-Assad Syria ====
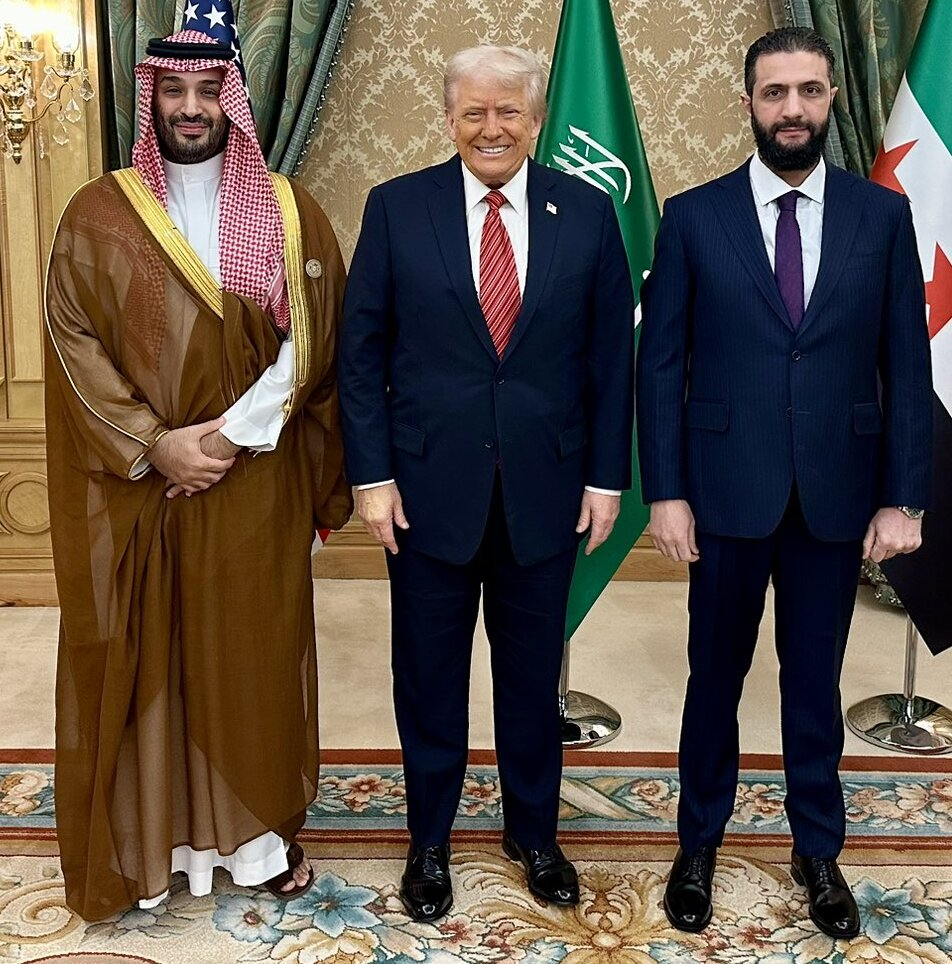
US president Donald Trump with Crown Prince of Saudi Arabia Mohammed bin Salman and President of Syria Ahmed al-Sharaa in Riyadh. Trump announced on 12 May that sanctions imposed on Syria would be lifted.

A number of humanitarian aid exemptions have been embedded within the sanctions mechanisms to allow approved humanitarian aid to civilians living in Syria; nonetheless, many humanitarian aid efforts towards Syria have been blocked due to the effects of sanctions.

In January 2025, International talks in Riyadh, Saudi Arabia called for easing sanctions on Syria after Assad's ousting. Saudi Arabia advocated lifting sanctions to aid reconstruction, while six EU nations proposed temporary relief in sectors like energy and banking to support humanitarian efforts. The US issued a six-month license for limited transactions but maintained broader sanctions to "ensure human rights compliance and stability".

On 24 February 2025, EU foreign policy chief Kaja Kallas announced that the European Union lifted sanctions against Syria in some key sectors, such as energy, transport, and banking.

On 24 April 2025, the United Kingdom lifted sanctions on Syrian government bodies including the defense and interior ministries.

On 13 May 2025, during his trip to Saudi Arabia, US president Donald Trump announced that he was lifting all sanctions on Syria, stating that "they have endured enough disasters, wars, and killing" and that his administration was willing to normalize relations with Syria's new government. On 23 May 2025, the Trump administration lifted a wide range of sanctions on Syria. On 30 June, Trump signed an executive order lifting sanctions imposed by the United States against Syria except those linked to the Assad family and their associates and related institutions.

On 20 May 2025, the EU lifted all economic sanctions on Syria.

On 18 December 2025, US president Donald Trump signed the National Defense Authorization Act for Fiscal Year 2026 into law, formally repealing the Caesar Act sanctions against Syria. During the 2026 northeastern Syria offensive, US senator Lindsey Graham threatened to reinstate sanctions against Syria.

On 11 May 2026, the Council of the European Union has restored the Cooperation Agreement with Syria, which was suspended since 2011.

On 8 July 2026, Secretary of State Marco Rubio notified Congress that President Trump decided to rescind Syria's designation as a state sponsor of terrorism. Under U.S. law, the notification started a 45-day congressional review before the rescission could take effect.

== Sanctioned individuals ==
This is a partial list of Syrian officials who have been subjected to sanctions, some of them prior to 2011. President Assad was sanctioned for the first time on 18 May 2011.

- Bashar al-Assad (born 1965)
- Asma al-Assad (born 1975)
- Farouk al-Sharaa (born 1938)
- Mohammad al-Shaar (born 1950)
- Ali Habib Mahmud (1939–2020)
- Faisal Mekdad (born 1954)
- Abdel-Fatah Qudsiyeh (born 1953)
- Maher al-Assad (born 1967)
- Jamil Hassan (born 1952)
- Walid Muallem (1941–2020)
- Ali Abdul Karim (born 1953)
- Dawoud Rajiha (1947–2012)
- Rustum Ghazaleh (1953–2015)
- Assef Shawkat (1950–2012)
- Mohammed Nasif Kheirbek (1937–2015)
- Ali Mamlouk (born 1946)

== Impacts on civilians ==
The sanctions imposed on Syria have mostly affected the normal civilian population, not so much the elites. Sanctions have led to the shortage of medical equipment and medicine in Syria as it's illegal for many international pharmaceutical companies to sell medicine to Syria due to sanctions, regardless of sanction exemption measures imposed by the United States and European Union towards medicine due to contradicting sanctions, medicines containing sanctioned chemicals, complex bureaucracy involved in getting approved for a sanction exemption license etc. Due to Syria's reliance on imports for anti-cancer medicine, its cancer treatment hospital capabilities have been heavily hampered. An Italian hospital director in Damascus told Middle East Eye in 2017 that its hospital had been partially financed by donations until sanctions prevented financial transactions to Syrian banks.

Although sanctions did not prevent transfer of funds to registered NGOs working in Syria, sanctions have led to many fund-raising and money transfer companies (such as PayPal, Venmo and GoFundMe) to block or suspend attempts by charities and individuals seeking to send money to both government- and opposition-controlled areas due to sanctions against banks and payment processors. The licensing requirements and complex bureaucracy of sanctions paperwork required for nonprofit organizations seeking to send humanitarian aid to Syria, combined with increasing audits for NGOs working in areas controlled by Islamists, had cost charity organizations millions of dollars by 2016. The bank accounts of many charities, including those working in non-government areas, were blocked or frozen due to banks' over-compliance with sanctions.

Due to US sanctions banning the export, sale or supply of goods, software, technology and services to Syria, people in Syria were barred from accessing Western online platforms used for education, online shopping, work or leisure, such as Google, Netflix, Amazon, Zoom, Apple Inc. etc.

Financial transaction sanctions made it illegal for video game companies to allow people in Syria to access their platforms. Sanctions in 2019 on services towards Syria and Iran made it illegal for free-to-play video game companies to let people in Syria access their platform, regardless of removing financial transactions within their games for people in Syria in trying to avoid previous sanctions, which forced video game companies to not allow people on their platforms in Iran and Syria.

After the 2023 earthquakes, charity fundraising attempts towards supporting family members in government and opposition regions of Syria on the GoFundMe platform were blocked due to sanctions while the platform continued to only allow transfers to pre-approved registered NGOs and suspended other accounts attempting to send money to Syria for fear of non-compliance with US sanctions relating to banks and payment processors. After the US temporarily lifted certain sanctions, GoFundMe notified suspended charity accounts that they could send donations to Syria on their platform.

Sanctions against Syria, even when exempt during natural catastrophes had been criticised by a number of organisations. A report by the Brookings Institution pointed out that EU and US sanctions have led to severe shortages and contributed to the collapse of the Syrian currency. These strict sanction policies actually reduced the influence of Western nations with liberal democratic institutions and increased Syria's ties with nations such as Russia, China and Arab nations including Iran. The punitive sanctions had also unintended consequences on the Syrian populations and hindered the development of a middle class in the country that could change the economic course of the Syrian nation. After the US and the EU temporarily lifted some minor sanctions subsequent to the 2023 Turkey–Syria earthquake, and the Middle East further destabilised during the Gaza war, an increase of Syrian refugees entering Western Europe via Cyprus was again clearly observed.

== Positions ==
The 2004 sanctions were supported by Israel's Minister of Foreign Affairs Silvan Shalom in a public statement.

More recently, especially in the 2020s with the normalisation of Syria's international relations, a number of countries, such as China, Iran, Russia, the United Arab Emirates and humanitarian organizations have called for the sanctions to be lifted.

Hezbollah has criticized sanctions against Syria and accused the US of trying to starve Syria. On multiple occasions Hezbollah ignored sanctions and sent both weapons and humanitarian aid to Syria, leading to many of its weapon convoys being bombed by Israel.

Chinese state media reported that Syria's Foreign Minister Faisal Mekdad said the Syrian nation has been deprived of $107 billion in oil and gas earnings since 2011 due to sanctions and the US exporting Syrian crude oil from areas under US and US ally control.

Alena Douhan, the United Nations Special Rapporteur on unilateral coercive measures, demanded that the US and the EU abolish their unilateral sanctions, alleging that they violate international law.

Critics argue that Bashar al-Assad had weaponized humanitarian relief efforts as a tool to punish people in opposition-held territories, throughout the course of the civil war. Muslim-American civic organization Emgage said that sanctions did not bear impact on humanitarian aid, instead criticizing Russian and Iranian governments for obscuring "Assad's role in destroying the country" and economic mismanagement.

== See also ==
- United States sanctions
- Caesar Syria Civilian Protection Act
- Sanctions against Iraq
- Sanctions against Iran
