= Hamza al-Mustafa =

Syrian politician

- حمزة المصطفى
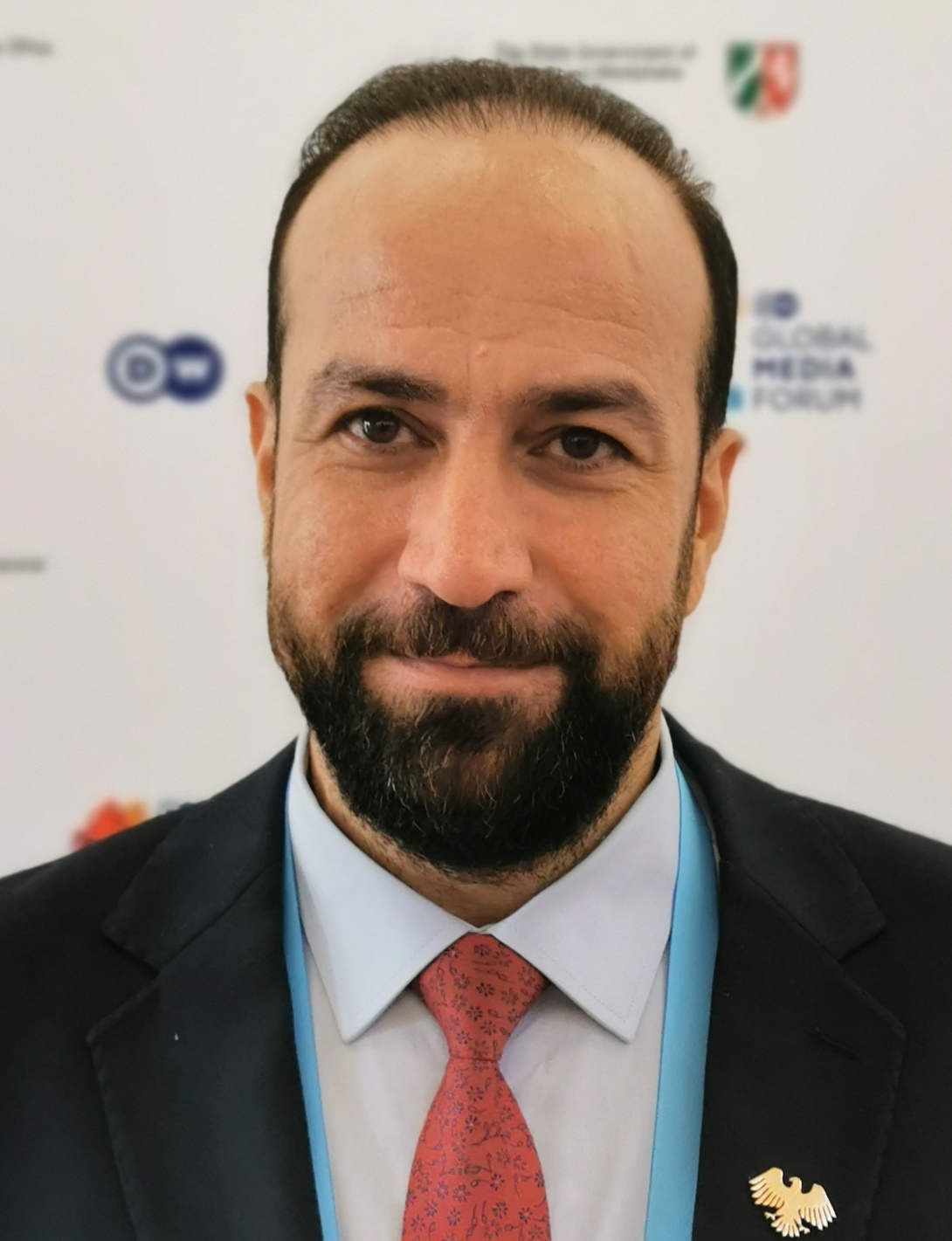
- Al-Mustafa in 2025

Minister of Information
- In office 29 March 2025 – 9 May 2026
- President: Ahmed al-Sharaa
- Preceded by: Mohammed al-Omar
- Succeeded by: Khaled Fawaz Zaarour

Personal details
- Born: 1985 (age 40–41) Hama, Syria
- Education: University of Exeter (PhD)
- Occupation: Academic, researcher, media executive

Hamza al-Mustafa (Arabic: حمزة المصطفى; born 1985) is a Syrian politician, academic, researcher, and media executive who served as the Minister of Information between March 2025 and May 2026.

== Education and academic career ==
Al-Mustafa holds a PhD from the University of Exeter in the United Kingdom. He has published several peer-reviewed studies, books, and articles on Syrian political and media issues.

His works include The Virtual Public Sphere in the Syrian Revolution: Characteristics, Trends, and Mechanisms of Public Opinion Formation. He also co-authored The Kurdish Question in Syria: Reality, History, and Myth and Backgrounds of the Revolution: Syrian Studies.

== Career ==
Al-Mustafa worked as a researcher at the Arab Center for Research and Policy Studies, where he focused on political and social issues in Syria and the wider region. He later became the Director General of Syria TV, overseeing its operations and editorial direction.

On 29 March 2025, he was appointed as Syria's Minister of Information in the Syrian transitional government. On 9 May 2026, as part of a partial government shuffle, al-Mustafa was dismissed, moved to the foreign ministry, and replaced by Khaled Fawaz Zaarour.

== See also ==
- Cabinet of Syria
