= Ministry of Information (Syria) =

Government ministry of Syria

- وزارة الإعلام
- Emblem of Syria

- Logo of the Ministry of Information

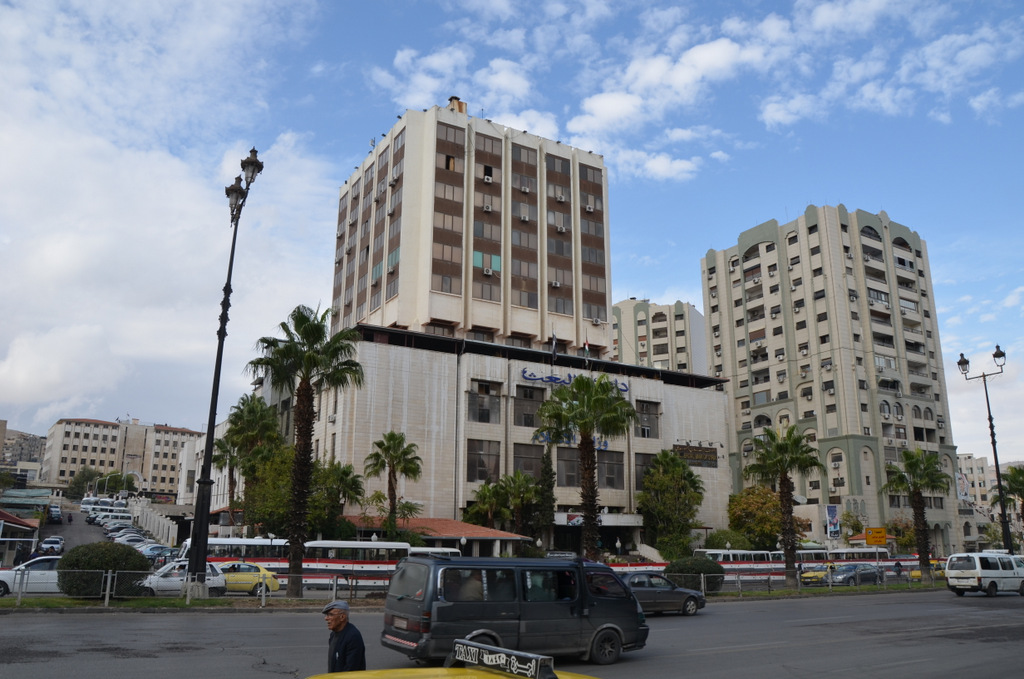

Agency overview
- Formed: 1961
- Jurisdiction: Government of Syria
- Headquarters: Damascus
- Minister responsible: Khaled Zaarour
- Website: momc.gov.sy

The Ministry of Information (Arabic: وزارة الإعلام, romanized: Wizārat al-Iʿlām) is a government ministry office in Syria responsible for media, press and informations. It is part of the Council of Ministers of Syria.

== Responsibility ==
According to the Ministry of Information, it is responsible for:

- Strengthening the national feeling, social cooperation and spreading the spirit of solidarity among the people.
- Defending the issues of the Arab nation and its goals in terms of unity, freedom and socialism, and supporting the Arab national, national and progressive struggle in its various fields.
- Contribute to the dissemination of culture among the masses.
- Addressing social problems and advocating adherence to authentic Arab values.
- Reviving the Arab heritage in various literary, scientific and artistic fields.
- Informing the masses of the achievements of human civilization in various fields.
- Enlightening public opinion and informing it of the facts in the field of internal and external news, and informing it of the progress, trends and goals of events in the Arab world and the world.
- Introducing the Syrian Arab Republic and the Arab world globally.
- Upgrading the level of all kinds of arts.
- Encouraging talents in various fields of thought and creativity.
- Strengthening ties and relations between resident citizens and expatriate Arabs.
- Providing media and cultural services by encouraging scientific, literary, intellectual and artistic production, and encouraging production in the aforementioned fields.

== Organisation ==
The Ministry of Information was created in the Syrian Arab Republic based on Legislative Decree No. 186 (1961) regarding the creation and updates of the Ministry of Information.

The organizational structure consists of the following departments:

Central administration

- Directorate of Minister's Office
- Assistant Minister's Office
- Department of Administrative and Legal Affairs
- Administrative Department
- Occupational Affairs Division
- Legal Department
- Personnel Affairs Department
- Leaves Division
- Promotions Division
- Legal Follow-up Department
- Department of Legal Studies and Consultations
- Department of Development Media
- Department of Planning and International Cooperation
- Department of Planning and Statistics
- Planning and Follow-up Division
- Statistics Division
- Department of International Cooperation
- Department of Qualification and Training
- Directorate of Research and Studies
- Directorate of Internal Oversight
- Directorate of Financial Affairs
- Directorate of Translation Office of Public Relations
- Department of Jahness
- Administrative Directorate of Publications and Publishing Department of Periodicals
- License Department of Publications and Books
- Licensing Department
- Department of Publishing Houses, Printing Press and Libraries
- Administrative Office
- Central Post Office
- Damascus International Airport Office
- Directorate of Administrative Development

Directorates in Governorates:

- Directorate of Information in Aleppo Governorate
- Directorate of Media in Homs Governorate
- Directorate of Information in Hama Governorate
- Directorate of Information in Latakia Governorate
- Directorate of Information in Tartous Governorate

=== Affiliates of the Ministry ===
- Public Authority for Radio and Television
  - General Authority for Radio and Television (GART)
- Syrian Arab News Agency (SANA)
- Al Wahda Foundation for Press, Printing, Publishing and Distribution (includes Al-Thawra Al-Souria and Freedom)
- The Arab Advertising Foundation
- Publications Distribution Company
- Technical Institute for Printing and Publishing,
- Media Preparation Institute

== List of ministers ==
No.	Name	Term of office		Ref.
No.	Name	Took office	Left office	Ref.
1	Abdullah Abdul Dayem	14 April 1962	19 June 1962	
2	Abdul Salam al-Ujayli	20 June 1962	16 September 1962	
3	Abdul Halim Kaddour	17 September 1962	8 March 1963	
4	Sami al-Jundi	13 May 1963	14 May 1964	
5 (1)	Abdullah Abdul Dayem	14 May 1964	3 October 1964	
6	Mashhour Zeitoun	3 October 1964	23 September 1965	
7	Suleiman al-Khash	23 September 1965	27 December 1965	
8	Shaker Mustafa	1 January 1966	23 February 1966	
9	Jamil Shia	1 March 1966	16 October 1966	
10	Mohammed al-Zoubi	16 October 1966	28 September 1967	
11	Habib Haddad	28 September 1967	28 October 1968	
12	Asaad Saqr	29 October 1968	29 October 1969	
13	Hammoud al-Qabbani	29 October 1969	21 October 1970	
14	Naji al-Darawsheh	21 October 1970	3 April 1971	
15	Fayez Naser	4 April 1971	21 March 1972	
16	Ahmed Hassan al-Asaad	22 March 1972	25 August 1973	
17	George Sedqni	26 August 1973	31 August 1974	
18	Ahmed Iskandar Ahmed	1 September 1974	10 March 1984	
19	Yassin Rajjouh	11 March 1974	31 October 1987	
20	Mohammed Samlan	1 November 1998	12 March 2000	
21	Adnan Omran	13 March 2000	17 September 2003	
22	Ahmed al-Hassan	18 September 2003	3 October 2004	
23	Mahdi Dakhlallah	4 October 2004	10 February 2006	
24	Muhsen Bilal	11 February 2004	13 April 2011	
25	Adnan Mahmoud	14 April 2011	22 June 2012	
26	Omran Ahed al-Zoubi	23 June 2012	3 July 2016	
27	Mohammed Ramez Tourjman	4 July 2016	1 January 2018	
28	Imad Abullah Sarah	1 January 2018	10 August 2021	
29	Boutros al-Hallaq	10 August 2021	23 September 2024	
30	Ziad Ghosn	23 September 2024	10 December 2024	
31	Mohammed al-Omar	10 December 2024	29 March 2025	
32	Hamza al-Mustafa	29 March 2025	9 May 2026	
33	Khaled Fawaz Zaarour	9 May 2026	Incumbent	
