= Riyadh meetings on Syria (2025) =

International conference on post-Assad Syria in Saudi Arabia

Riyadh meetings on Syria اجتماعات الرياض بشأن سوريا
- Date: 12 January 2025
- Locations: Riyadh, Saudi Arabia
- Participants: Officials from: (Cooperation Council for the Arab States of the Gulf) Gulf Cooperation Council; Saudi Arabia; Oman; United Arab Emirates; Kuwait; Qatar; Bahrain; Syria; Iraq; Lebanon; Jordan; Egypt; Turkey; United Kingdom; Germany; France; Spain; United States; Italy; Arab League; United Nations; European Union

The Riyadh meetings on Syria (Arabic: اجتماعات الرياض بشأن سوريا) were convened on 12 January 2025 in Riyadh, Saudi Arabia. The high-level international and Arab gathering aimed to discuss the situation in Syria and explore steps to stabilize the country following the fall of former President Bashar al-Assad's regime.

== Context ==
The Riyadh meetings were part of a broader effort to secure stability and security in Syria after the fall of the Assad regime. This event followed a meeting held in Aqaba, Jordan, on 14 December 2024, which also addressed regional issues in Syria.

== Agenda ==
The primary focus of the Riyadh meetings was to deliberate on the necessary steps to ensure Syria's stability and security. Topics on the agenda included:

- Post-conflict reconstruction
- Refugee repatriation
- Combating terrorism
- Strengthening regional and international cooperation

== Participants ==
The meetings were attended by foreign ministers and representatives from various countries and organizations. Participants included:

- Member states of the Gulf Cooperation Council
- Syria (Syrian caretaker government)
- Iraq
- Lebanon
- Jordan
- Egypt
- Turkey
- United Kingdom
- Germany
- France
- Spain
- United States (represented by the Under Secretary of State)
- Italy (represented by the Deputy Minister of Foreign Affairs)
- High Representative of the Union for Foreign Affairs and Security Policy of the European Union, Kaja Kallas
- Secretary-General of the Arab League, Ahmed Aboul Gheit
- Secretary-General of the Gulf Cooperation Council, Jasem Mohamed Albudaiwi
- United Nations Special Envoy for Syria, Geir Pedersen

== Sessions ==
The meetings were divided into two main sessions:

- Arab Session: Focused discussions among Arab states on regional priorities and cooperative strategies.
- Expanded Session: Broader participation, including representatives from the European Union, the United Nations, and other key international actors.

== Notable events and statements ==
- Syrian Foreign Minister Asaad al-Shaibani met with his Saudi, Jordanian, Bahraini, and Turkish counterparts. He also held talks with UN envoy to Syria Geir Pedersen, and, for the first time since severing the British-Syrian relations, UK Foreign Secretary David Lammy.
- (Saudi Arabia) Saudi Foreign Minister Faisal bin Farhan Al Saud emphasized the importance of lifting both unilateral and international sanctions imposed on Syria. He also welcomed the measures undertaken by the new Syrian administration and reaffirmed the commitment to continuing various forms of support for Syria.
- (Oman) Omani Foreign Minister Badr bin Hamad Al Busaidi stated that the meeting reflects the positive spirit of collective cooperation and shared responsibility in supporting Syria and reinforcing peace and stability in the region.
- (United Arab Emirates) UAE Foreign Minister Abdullah bin Zayed Al Nahyan emphasized the importance of the unity of the Syrian people, in all its segments, to build a unified, stable, and secure Syria free from terrorism and exclusion.
- Qatari Prime Minister and Foreign Minister Mohammed bin Abdulrahman bin Jassim Al Thani affirmed Qatar's full support for the unity of the Syrian people and emphasized Qatar's commitment to assisting Syria during this crucial phase of rebuilding the country and restoring its territorial integrity.
- (Egypt) Egyptian Foreign Minister Badr Abdelatty urged international cooperation to prevent Syria from becoming a source of instability or a hub for terrorism. He emphasized the need to preserve Syria's unity, support its institutions, and pursue an inclusive Syrian-led political process in line with UN Resolution 2254. Abdelatty also stressed combating terrorism and fostering national reconciliation to rebuild Syria and restore its regional and international role.
- Turkish Foreign Minister Hakan Fidan reaffirmed Turkey's readiness to support the Syrian people and facilitate regional solutions, describing the process as a "difficult road." He emphasized the responsibility of regional countries in guiding developments in Syria towards the right path while maintaining Syria's territorial integrity and sovereignty. Fidan proposed the creation of mechanisms or coordination committees to enhance the effectiveness of efforts and suggested prioritizing sectors for sanction relief in the coming period. He reiterated that the Syrian Democratic Forces (SDF) must dissolve themselves if they seek integration with the new Syrian authority.
- (United Kingdom) British Foreign Secretary David Lammy reaffirmed the UK's commitment to supporting the Syrian people and a Syrian-led political transition toward an inclusive and non-sectarian government. He highlighted the importance of inclusive governance, humanitarian aid, cooperation on chemical weapons, and addressing the threat of ISIL. He called for international unity to help Syria build a democratic and modern future.
- (Germany) German Foreign Minister Annalena Baerbock emphasized the importance of a fair political dialogue and a reconstruction process led by Syrians, with unified international support. She stressed the significance of the presence of key international players in fostering peaceful processes for Syria and the broader Middle East.
- (Cooperation Council for the Arab States of the Gulf) GCC Secretary-General Jasem Mohamed Albudaiwi condemned repeated Israeli attacks on Syria and the expansion of Israeli settlements in the occupied Golan Heights, stressing the need for Israel to withdraw from occupied territories. He also called for lifting international sanctions on Syria.

== See also ==
- Saudi Arabia–Syria relations
- Syria–European Union relations
- Syrian civil war
- International reactions to the Syrian civil war
