= Ahmad Hassan (Syrian politician) =

Syrian diplomat and politician (born 1940)

Minister of Information
- In office 2003 – 4 October 2004
- President: Bashar al-Assad
- Prime Minister: Muhammad Naji al-Otari
- Preceded by: Adnan Omran
- Succeeded by: Mahdi Dakhlallah

Personal details
- Born: 1940 (age 85–86)
- Died: April 2025
- Party: Syrian Regional Branch of the Arab Socialist Ba'ath Party

Ahmad Hassan (born 1940) is a Syrian diplomat and politician who served as information minister from 2003 to 2004.

== Early life ==
Hassan hails from an Alawi family based in Lattakia. He was born, in 1940, in a village near Lattakia and later moved to Baniyas.

== Career ==
Hassan served as the head of the first Baathist school in the 1960s. He is a member of Syrian Regional Branch of the Arab Socialist Ba'ath Party and close to former vice president Abdul Halim Khaddam. He was also an auxiliary-member of the National Leadership until 1984 when then president Hafez al-Assad removed the Khaddam faction from the Leadership.

Hassan served as Syria's ambassador to Iran for a long time since the early 1990s until being replaced by Hamid Hassan in May 2003. He was appointed information minister to the Syrian cabinet in 2003 and replaced Adnan Omran in the post. Hassan's term ended in October 2004, and he was succeeded by Mahdi Dakhlallah as information minister.

Political offices
Preceded by Adnan Omran	Minister of Information; 2003–2004	Succeeded by Mahdi Dakhlallah
