= Khaled Fawaz Zaarour =

Syrian politician (born 1990)

- خالد فواز زعرور

Minister of Information
- Incumbent
- Assumed office 9 May 2026
- President: Ahmed al-Sharaa
- Preceded by: Hamza al-Mustafa

Personal details
- Born: 1990 (age 35–36) Damascus, Syria
- Education: Damascus University (BA); Lebanese University (MA, PhD); Daawa University Institute for Islamic Studies (PhD)

Khaled Fawaz Zaarour (Note: Arabic: خالد فواز زعرور) is a Syrian politician and academic who is currently serving as the Minister of Information since 9 May 2026.

== Education and career ==
Zaarour graduated with a Bachelor's degree in Media from Damascus University in 2011. He later moved to Lebanon and obtained a Master's degree in Media Institution Evaluation and Development in 2014 and a PhD in Digital Media in 2019, both from the Lebanese University. Additionally, Zaarour obtained a PhD in Islamic Studies in 2024 from the Daawa University Institute for Islamic Studies in Beirut.

He had previously worked as a lecturer at several Lebanese and Syrian universities between 2015 and 2024. He was later appointed as Dean of the Faculty of Media at Damascus University in March 2025, shortly following the fall of the Assad regime. The appointment sparked controversy at the time, reportedly due to the lack of clarification regarding the criteria for which Zaarour was chosen, and the legal framework for his appointment.

The Syrian Arab News Agency reported that Zaarour had signed nine strategic agreements with international media organizations, including Al Jazeera, BBC, and France 24, and contributed to the training of over 100 graduates and students and participated in developing media curricula in northwestern Syria. (Note: The territory was administered by the Syrian opposition during the Syrian civil war.)

He received a research award from the American University of Beirut in 2019 and an honor from the Iraqi University in 2022.

Zaarour supervised a number of master's theses and doctoral dissertations, participated in many media conferences, and has 5 scientific papers published in peer-reviewed journals as of May 2026.

=== Appointment as Minister of Information ===
On 9 May 2026, Syrian President Ahmed al-Sharaa issued decree No. 100 of 2026 appointing Zaarour as Minister of Information, succeeding Hamza al-Mustafa.

== Controversies ==
Zaarour's Appointment as Dean of the Faculty of Media at Damascus University in March 2025 sparked controversy at the time, reportedly due to the lack of clarification regarding the criteria for which Zaarour was chosen, and the legal framework for his appointment. Some journalists and social media users circulated a video of a lecture given by Zaarour titled "A Lecture on Trivial Media and the Responsibility of Preachers and Opinion Leaders", which some critics cited as evidence that he was unfit for the position.

In another clip of Zaarour speaking, unclear if taken from the same lecture, he referred to what he described as a "society of dayatha" (roughly corresponding to cuckoldry or moral permissiveness in a religious sense). In the clip, Zaarour criticized the practice of some people sharing photos or videos of their wives, daughters, or sisters on social media under the guise of documenting everyday moments, arguing that such behavior conflicted with moral values and social ethics. He called this "society of dayatha" the "D Community", saying it is similar to the naming of the "M Community", (Note: The term "M Community", with the "M" pronounced "Meem" (the Arabic name for the letter م which corresponds to M), is used in Arabic as an equivalent to the LGBT community, since the Arabic words commonly used for gay, lesbian, bisexual, and transgender identities all begin with the letter "م" (Meem).) which he described as an abnormality that needs metal and physical therapy.

The remarks sparked sharp criticism from journalists and activists, some of whom described his views as "reactionary" and unsuitable for someone serving as dean of a faculty of media. Others criticized his use of the term "dayatha", (Note: Arabic: دياثة) arguing that it was a religious and derogatory expression inappropriate for media discourse and one that broadly stigmatized families who post images of family members online. Journalists also criticized Zaarour's emphasis on the "ethics of media appearance" based on personal standards relating to dress and appearance rather than professional media standards. Some additionally questioned his views regarding women working in journalism and whether his personal opinions could affect women's freedoms within the media sector.

In response to the controversy surrounding the "dayatha" video, Zaarour said that his remarks were made during a series of lectures on the ethics of digital media practice. According to him, the discussion focused on online content that violates the dignity of women, men, and children, as well as the growing exploitation of children in digital media for financial gain. He stated that part of the clip reflected his personal beliefs, which he said he respected others for disagreeing with, while another part was intended as an academic discussion on establishing ethical and professional standards for digital content creation. Zaarour also said that his personal views were shaped by digital analysis and data and could change as circumstances and information evolved. However, he stressed the distinction between private opinion and official academic positions, noting that his personal beliefs did not necessarily represent his approach as dean of the Faculty of Media.

== See also ==
- Cabinet of Syria
