= Omran al-Zoubi =

Syrian politician (1959–2018)

- عمران الزعبي
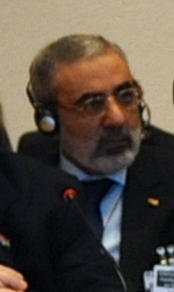

Minister of Information
- In office 23 June 2012 – July 2016
- President: Bashar al-Assad
- Prime Minister: Riyad Farid Hijab; Omar Ibrahim Ghalawanji; Wael Nader al-Halqi
- Preceded by: Adnan Hassan Mahmoud
- Succeeded by: Mohammad Ramez Tourjman

Personal details
- Born: 27 September 1959 Damascus, United Arab Republic
- Died: July 4, 2018 (aged 58) Damascus, Syria

Omran Ahed al-Zoubi (Arabic: عمران عاهد الزعبي) (27 September 1959 in Damascus, Syria – 4 July 2018 in Damascus, Syria) was the Minister of Information in the Government of Syria from 23 June 2012 until July 2016. He died from a heart attack on 6 July 2018.
