= Istanbul Sabahattin Zaim University =

Private university in İstanbul, Turkey

- Type: Private
- Established: April 10, 2010; 16 years ago
- Location: Istanbul, Turkey; 41°01′59″N 28°47′20″E
- Campus: Rural
- Website: www.izu.edu.tr

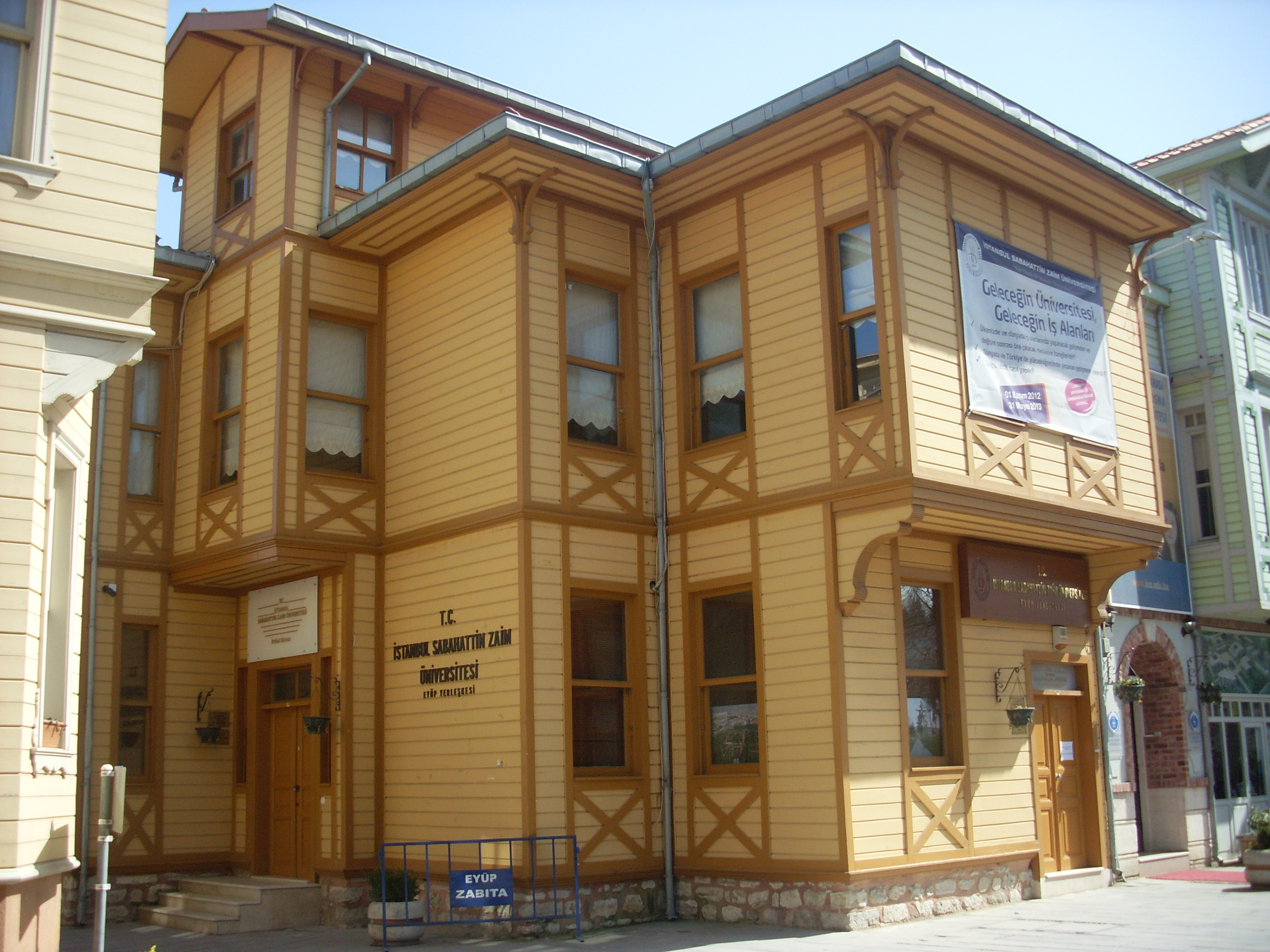
Research Center of Istanbul Sabahattin Zaim University in Eyüp, Istanbul

Istanbul Sabahattin Zaim University (Turkish: İstanbul Sabahattin Zaim Üniversitesi) is a Turkish private higher-education institution established by "İlim Yayma Vakfı" (literally: Foundation for the Propagation of Science) on April 24, 2010. Classes at the university began in the 2011–12 term.

The university was named after Sabahattin Zaim (1926-2007), a professor of economics in the Faculty of Economics at Istanbul University until 1993. A Macedonian from birth, he served as the founding rector of the International University of Sarajevo in 2003-04 after he taught at several universities in and outside Turkey. He was also a founding member of İlim Yayma Vakfı.

The university's main campus is located in Halkalı, the faculty building is situated in Altunizade, and the research center is in Eyüp.

== Academics ==
As of March 2017, the university consists of following units:

=== Faculties ===
- Faculty of Education
  - Mentorship and Psychological Consulting.
  - English language Teach
  - Pre-school Teach
  - Turkish language Teach
  - Teacher Training in Arabic
  - Special Education Teaching
- Faculty of Law
  - Law
- Faculty of Engineering and Natural Sciences
  - Architecture
  - Electrical & Electronics Engineering
  - Computer engineering
  - Software Engineering
  - Food engineering

==== Industrial Engineering ====
  - Interior Architecture and Environmental Design
- Faculty of Business administration
  - Business administration (English language)
  - Economics (English language)
  - International Trade and Finance)
  - Islamic Economics and Finance
- Faculty of Human and Social Sciences
  - Political Science and International Relations (English language)
  - History
  - Psychology
  - Sociology
- Faculty of Health Care
  - Nursing
  - Department of Social Work
  - Health Management
  - Nutrition and Dietetics
- Faculty of Islamic Sciences
  - Islamic Science
- Faculty of Medicine

== Institutes ==
- INSTITUTE OF SCIENCE AND TECHNOLOGY
  - Architecture(Doctore) (Thesis)
  - Computer Science and Engineering(Doctore) (Thesis/Non thesis)
  - Food Engineering(Doctore) (Thesis/Non thesis)
  - Urbanism and Urban Transformation (Doctore)
  - Urban Studies and Management (Thesis/Non thesis)
  - Nutrition and Dietetics (Thesis/Non thesis)
  - Occupational Health and Safety (Thesis/Non thesis)
- INSTITUTE OF SOCIAL SCIENCES
  - Business Administration(Doctore)(Thesis/Non thesis)
  - Education Administration and Supervision(Doctore) (Thesis/Non thesis)
  - English Language and Literature(Doctore)
  - English Language Teaching (Thesis)
  - History and Civilization Studies(Doctore)
  - Islamic Economics and International Finance(Doctore)
  - Islamic Economics and Law (Arabic)(Doctore)(Thesis/Non thesis)
  - Islamic Sciences(Doctore) (Thesis/Non thesis)
  - Public law(Doctore) (Thesis/Non thesis)
  - Political Science and International Relations (Doctore)(Thesis/Non thesis)
  - Social Work(Doctore) (Thesis/Non thesis)
  - Sociology(Doctore) (Thesis/Non thesis)
  - Education Administration(Thesis/Non thesis)
  - Psychological Counseling and Guidance(Thesis/Non thesis)
  - International Finance and Participation Banking(Thesis/Non thesis)
  - Family Counseling and Education(Thesis/Non thesis)
  - History and Civilization Studies(Thesis/Non thesis)

== Vocational higher schools ==
- Higher school for Foreign languages
  - English language Interpreter-Translator
- Higher school for Physical Education and Sports

=== Institutes ===
- Institute of Social Science
- Institute of Natural Science

== Notable alumni ==
- Asaad Hassan al-Shaybani, foreign minister in the Syrian transitional government

== See also ==
- List of universities in Turkey
