= Embassy of Syria, London =

Embassy in London, England

Embassy of the Syrian Arab Republic in London سفارة الجمهورية العربية السورية في لندن
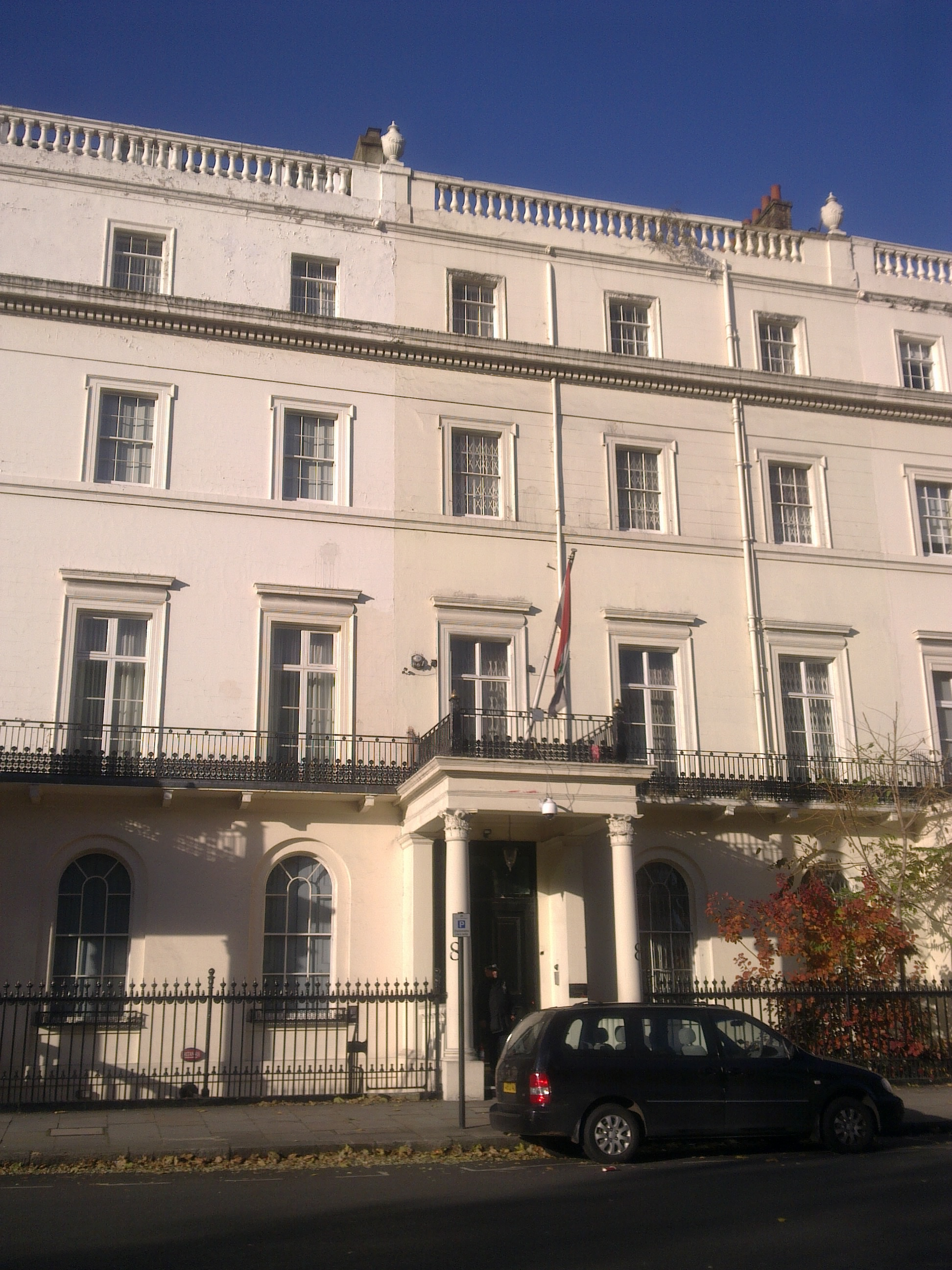
- Location: Belgravia, London
- Address: 8 Belgrave Square, London, SW1X 8PH
- Coordinates: 51.4997°N 0.1549°W
- Ambassador: vacant

The Embassy of Syria in London (Arabic: سفارة الجمهورية العربية السورية في لندن) is the diplomatic mission of the Syria to the United Kingdom. The chancery is located at 8 Belgrave Square of London.

== History ==
During the Syrian Civil War the embassy has seen several protests: by those opposed to government of Bashar al-Assad in 2011 and 2012 and by the well-known Islamist Anjem Choudary in 2013. The British government, along with several other countries, expelled the Syrian ambassador in May 2012 in protest at the escalating violence in the country. The embassy closed in late 2013. The Syrian embassy was reopened on 13 November 2025, with Syrian Foreign Minister Asaad al-Shaibani raised the new Syrian flag over the embassy building.

== See also ==
- List of diplomatic missions of Syria
- Syria–United Kingdom relations
