= Ali Abdul Karim =

Syrian diplomat (born 1953)

- Born: علي عبد الكريم; 1953 (age 72–73)
- Education: University of Damascus
- Occupation: diplomat

Ali Abdul Karim (Arabic: علي عبد الكريم) (born 1953 in Latakia, Syria) is a Syrian diplomat. He was the first Syrian ambassador to Lebanon. Before that he served as the ambassador to Kuwait and as the general manager of the Syrian Arab News Agency (SANA), and official Syrian Television.

He holds a B.A. in Arabic Literature from the University of Damascus.

In 2011, Abdul Karim was one of three senior Syrian officials sanctioned by the United States in response to the violent crackdown against anti-government protestors by the government of former president Bashar al-Assad. Abdul Karim's US assets were frozen and business transactions with him were banned.
