= Mahdi Dakhlallah =

Syrian politician (born 1947)

Member of the Central Command of the Syrian Regional Branch of the Baath Party
- In office 22 April 2017 – 4 May 2024

Minister of Information
- In office 4 October 2004 – February 2006
- President: Bashar al-Assad
- Prime Minister: Mohammad Naji Al Otari
- Preceded by: Ahmad Hassan
- Succeeded by: Mohsen Bilal

Personal details
- Born: Mahdi Hamdan Dakhlallah; 1947 (age 78–79)
- Party: Syrian Regional Branch of the Arab Socialist Ba'ath Party
- Education: Zagreb University

Mahdi Dakhlallah (Arabic: مهدي دخل الله; born 1947) is a Syrian Ba'ath party politician and diplomat. He served at different positions, including editor-in-chief, information minister and ambassador.

== Early life and education ==
Dakhlallah was born into a Sunni family in the Daraa Governorate in 1947. He studied politics at Zagreb University in former Yugoslavia and received a bachelor's degree. He also holds a Ph.D. in development which he obtained from the same university.

== Career ==
Dakhlallah is a member of the Syrian Regional Branch of the Arab Socialist Ba'ath Party and is known for his reformist and liberal views.

Dakhlallah served in various governmental positions. He worked in the research section at the National Leadership Council (Arabic: Qiyada Qawmya) from 1983 to 2001. Then he was charged with the writing the speeches for Abdullah Al Ahmar, who was assistant secretary-general of the party. Next, Dakhlallah served as the editor-in-chief of Al Baath, official daily of the party, from 2002 to 2004. He published two editorials entitled "Reform: Political or Economic?" and "Developing the Social Foundation: Much Work Awaits", in the daily in 2003 and 2004, arguing that both the role and influence of the Ba'ath party should have been reduced. He also called for significant democratic reforms in his editorials.

Dakhlallah was named as the information minister on 4 October 2004, replacing Ahmad Hassan in the post. Dakhlallah was in office until February 2006 when he was succeeded by Mohsen Bilal in a cabinet reshuffle. During his term, Dakhlallah urged the Syrian journalists to adopt a bolder approach. In addition, media outlets ended the use of the word rafiq that means Comrade in English while referring to the Ba'ath leaders except for the party's official daily Al Baath during his term. In 2005, Dakhlallah publicly said "Syrian newspapers were unreadable.", and he forced Syria's chief censor to resign. Dakhlallah also stated that Syrian media were in a transition period from "dirigiste media" to "media with a purpose", and that constitutions should not be regarded as holy entities and therefore, were subject to modification.

Dakhlallah headed the Strategic Studies Center at Regional Leadership until 2009. In October 2009, he was appointed Syrian ambassador to Saudi Arabia.

Political offices
Preceded by Ahmad Hassan	Minister of Information; 2004 – 2006	Succeeded by Mohsen Bilal
