= Boutros Al-Hallaq =

Syrian politician

HE Boutros Al-Hallaq بطرس الحلاق

Minister of Information
- In office 10 August 2021 – 23 September 2024
- President: Bashar al-Assad
- Prime Minister: Hussein Arnous
- Preceded by: Imad Abullah Sarah
- Succeeded by: Ziad Ghosn

Personal details
- Born: 1966 (age 59–60) Yabroud, Rif Dimashq Governorate, Syria
- Education: Cairo University
- Profession: Politician, Scientist, Dean

Boutros Al-Hallaq (Arabic: بطرس الحلاق) (born 1966) is a Syrian politician. Between 2021 and 2024, he served as Information Minister in the Cabinet of Syria.

He worked as Vice President of Scientific Affairs at Damascus University in 2021, and as Dean of the Media College from 2013 to 2017.

== International Sanctions ==
Al-Hallaq was sanctioned by the European Union in November 2021.

On 13 December 2023, he was placed on UK's Syria Sanctions List, making him subject to a travel ban and an asset freeze, due to his involvement in continued serious violations of human rights taking place in Syria under Bashar Assad's rule.
