= Syrian Arab News Agency =

Syrian state-owned news agency

- Type: State-owned
- Industry: News agency
- Founded: 24 June 1965; 61 years ago
- Founder: Syrian Arab Republic
- Headquarters: Damascus, Syria
- Key people: Khaled Fawaz Zaarour (CEO); Zyad Mahameed (COO)
- Owner: Government of Syria (Ministry of Information)
- Number of employees: 1,153
- Website: Arabic English French Turkish Spanish Kurdish

The Syrian Arab News Agency (SANA; Arabic: الوكالة العربية السورية للأنباء (سانا), romanized: al-Wakālah al-ʿArabīyah as-Sūrīyah lil-ʾAnbāʾ) is a Syrian state-owned news agency, linked to the country's ministry of information. It was established on 24 June 1965.

SANA publishes more than 500 news stories and 150 photos on a daily basis and operates in multiple languages: Arabic, English, French, Kurdish, Spanish, and Turkish. SANA published a Persian and Russian language versions, along with a Hebrew language version of their website since 2014, but all three editions were ended on 10 August 2025. The agency is also a member of the Federation of Arab News Agencies (FANA).

== History ==
=== Website ===
SANA launched its website in 1997. Up until November 2012, SANA's website was hosted in Dallas, Texas, by the United States company SoftLayer. Due to sanctions related to the Syrian Civil War, SoftLayer was obliged to terminate its hosting responsibilities with SANA, which it would afterwards.

SANA's English website states that the agency "adopts Syria's national firm stances and its support to the Arab and Islamic causes and principles with the aim of presenting the real civilized image of Syria."

Prior to the collapse of the Assad regime on 8 December 2024, the website was offline due to a hijacking attempt attributed to an unknown source.

=== Under Ba'athist Syria ===
According to German news agency Deutsche Welle; "when it comes to hard politics, the agency [SANA] has a clear agenda" and "SANA, being a public news agency, has a stake in the conflict to support Assad's government." It is critical of Western governments, including the US, which push for a regime-change in Syria. The agency also labeled the Syrian opposition as 'terrorists', rather than using the term 'rebels'.

In 2011, SANA published an article giving its version of events surrounding the death of 13-year-old Hamza Ali al-Khateeb, an account which differed from Al Jazeera's. Al Jazeera reported that Hamza "spent nearly a month in the custody of Syrian security" and when his corpse was returned it "bore the scars of brutal torture." According to Al Jazeera, "experienced local journalists and human rights researchers found no reason to doubt the authenticity of the footage of Hamza." According to SANA, armed groups arrived in the village of Saida and Hamza was found dead after the fighting and sent to a hospital to be identified. SANA, quoting a coroner, stated that Hamza died from three gunshots and that "there weren't any traces of violence, resistance or torture or any kinds of bruises, fractures, joint displacements or cuts." According to SANA, the photos of Hamza circulating online "were taken after an advanced stage of disintegration after death."

SANA called reports from August 2013 on a chemical attack in Ghouta "baseless" and an attempt to distract UN inspectors who had arrived in Syria to probe earlier allegations of chemical weapons use. SANA had reported that anti-government forces were responsible for firing a rocket containing chemical materials in the Khan-al Assal area of Aleppo province in March 2013.

In August 2015, after a three-day visit to Syria during the Syrian civil war, the emergency relief coordinator of the United Nations, Stephen O'Brien, told reporters he was "absolutely horrified by the total disregard for civilian life by all parties in this conflict." O'Brien condemned the conduct of rebel groups and said (of the government airstrikes in Douma) "[they]…caused scores of civilian deaths and hundreds of people were injured." SANA posted a video of his remarks on YouTube, editing the footage as a form of backlash, fading it to black before playing audio of his description of the government's attack. SANA also omitted O'Brien's account of events from his time in the Old City of Homs.

=== Under the Syrian transitional government ===
During the fall of Damascus on 8 December 2024, the outlet went inactive for 24 hours before changing its cover picture on Telegram to match the three-star flag used by rebels the next day.

=== Logo history ===
Logo from 2024 to 2025

Latin-script logo used since 2025

== Managers ==
- Fawaz Jundi (1965–1966)
- Hussein al-Awdat (1966–1971)
- Marwan al-Hamwi (1971–1975)
- Saber Falhout (1975–1991)
- Fayez al-Sayegh (1991–2000)
- Ali Abdul Karim (2000–2002)
- Ghazi al-Zeeb (2002–2004)
- Adnan Mahmoud (2004–2011)
- Ahmad Dawa (2011–2017)
- Abderrahim Ahmed (2017–2021)
- Eyad Wannous (2021–2024)
- Zyad Mahameed (2024–present)

== See also ==
- Federation of Arab News Agencies (FANA)
