= Asaad al-Shaibani =

Syrian politician and diplomat (born 1987)

- أسعد الشيباني
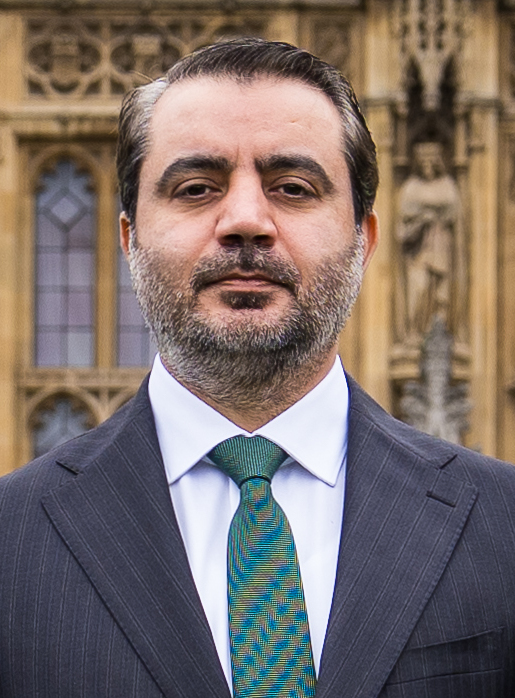
- Al-Shaibani in 2026

Minister of Foreign Affairs and Expatriates
- Incumbent
- Assumed office 21 December 2024
- President: Ahmed al-Sharaa (Note: As de facto leader until 29 January 2025.)
- Prime Minister: Mohammed al-Bashir (2024–2025)
- Preceded by: Bassam al-Sabbagh

Personal details
- Born: 1987 (age 38–39) Al-Hasakah, Syria
- Party: Independent (since 2025)
- Other political affiliations: Hay'at Tahrir al-Sham (until 2025)
- Education: Damascus University (BA); Istanbul Sabahattin Zaim University (MA)
- Profession: Politician, Diplomat

Military service
- Allegiance: Syria (2024–present); Formerly: Al-Nusra Front (until 2016); Jabhat Fateh al-Sham (2016–2017); Syrian Salvation Government (2017–2024); Hay'at Tahrir al-Sham (2017–2025)

Asaad Hassan al-Shaibani (Note: Arabic: أسعد حسن الشيباني, romanized: Asʿad Ḥasan al-Shaybānī) (born 1987) is a Syrian diplomat, politician, and former rebel who has been serving as the Minister of Foreign Affairs and Expatriates in the Syrian transitional government since December 2024. He is one of Ahmed al-Sharaa's closest allies and one of the most prominent figures in the country's post-Assad government.

Al-Shaibani was born in the eastern countryside of al-Hasakah Governorate to a Sunni Muslim family. He moved with his family to Damascus and graduated from Damascus University in 2009 with a degree in English Language and Literature. After the outbreak of the Syrian Civil War, al-Shaibani was a founding member of al-Nusra Front, where he befriended Ahmed al-Sharaa. Over the course of the war, Shaibani occupied prominent roles in al-Nusra and its successor organizations, and also received further academic training at Istanbul Sabahattin Zaim University.

After the fall of the Assad regime, al-Shaibani was appointed Minister of Foreign Affairs and Expatriates on 21 December 2024 in the caretaker government. He later retained his position in the transitional government formed in March 2025. During his tenure as foreign minister, al-Shaibani became the first Syrian official to visit Algeria, Russia, Egypt, Lebanon, the United Kingdom, and China following the fall of the Assad regime, as well as the first Syrian official to visit the United States in 25 years. He also participated in key international forums and continues to work on rebuilding relations with Western and global partners while consistently advocating for the lifting of sanctions on Syria.

== Early life and education ==
Al-Shaibani was born in 1987 into a Sunni Muslim family belonging to the Banu Shayban tribe in the eastern countryside of al-Hasakah Governorate. He moved with his family to reside in Damascus and graduated from Damascus University in 2009 with a degree in English Language and Literature from the Faculty of Arts and Humanities. He earned a master’s degree in Political Science and International Relations from Istanbul Sabahattin Zaim University in 2022 and pursued a Doctor of Philosophy in the same field until 2024. He is also completing the final stage of a Master of Business Administration program at an American university.

== Syrian civil war ==
Al-Shaibani was an active participant in the 2011 Syrian revolution. During the Syrian Civil War, al-Shaibani was a founding member of the al-Nusra Front, the al-Qaeda branch in Syria, alongside Ahmed al-Sharaa, with whom he became close. He headed the al-Nusra Front's foreign relations when it transitioned into Hay'at Tahrir al-Sham (HTS).

During the war, al-Shaibani operated under aliases, including "Naseem", "Abu Aisha", "Abu Ammar al-Shami", "Hussam al-Shafi'i", and most notably "Zaid al-Attar". Before his current role, he participated in founding the Syrian Salvation Government in 2017, establishing and heading up its Political Affairs Administration. In this role, he engaged with representatives from the United Nations, major international organizations, and diplomatic officials.

== Ministry of Foreign Affairs and Expatriates (2024–present) ==
=== Appointment ===
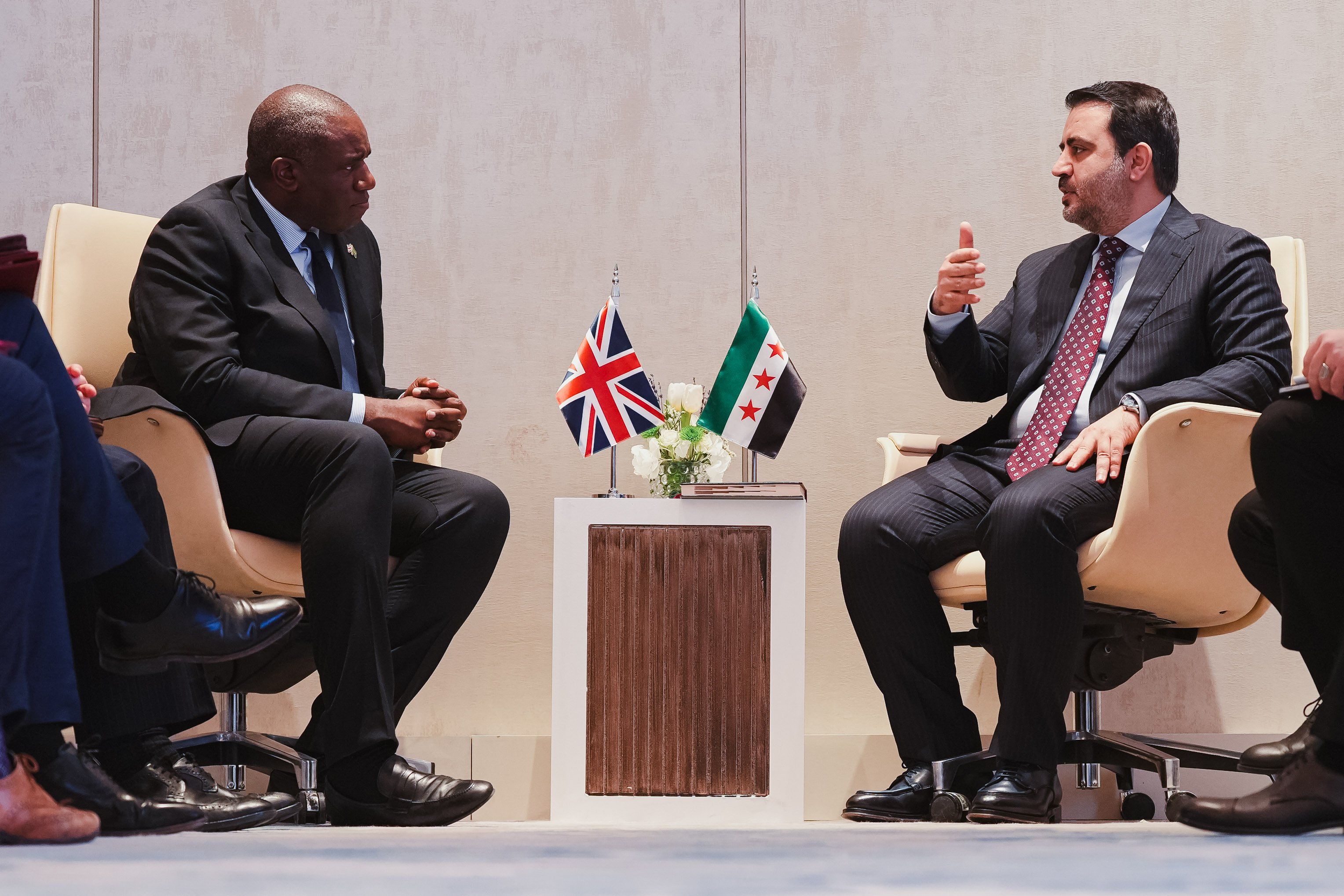
Al-Shaibani meets with UK Foreign Secretary David Lammy in Riyadh, Saudi Arabia, 12 January 2025

On 21 December 2024, al-Shaibani was appointed Minister of Foreign Affairs and Expatriates in the Syrian caretaker government formed following the fall of the Assad regime. The Syrian General Command named him foreign minister, and a source in the new administration told Reuters that this move "responds to the aspirations of the Syrian people to promote international relations that bring peace and stability."

=== Tenure as Foreign Minister ===
He immediately began shaping the foreign policy and diplomatic relations of the new government, which adopted a different approach from the previous Ba'athist regime. He also attended international meetings that the former government had been barred from due to the diplomatic isolation resulting from the Syrian civil war, which stemmed from the Ba'athist regime's violent crackdown on the 2011 Syrian revolution.

Al-Shaibani undertook diplomatic visits to various countries, including Gulf states, and most notably Turkey, with whom relations had been severed for nearly 14 years. He also visited the headquarters of the Organisation for the Prohibition of Chemical Weapons, during which he pledged that the Syrian government would destroy any remaining chemical weapons in the country.

He also participated in key international forums such as the 2025 Riyadh meetings on Syria, the 2025 World Economic Forum in Davos, and the 2025 Munich Security Conference. He continues to work to rebuild relations with Western and global partners while consistently advocating for the lifting of sanctions on Syria. On 22 January 2025, al-Shibani said at the World Economic Forum that the country would open its economy to foreign investment and that Damascus was also working on energy and electricity partnerships with Gulf states. He also accompanied Syrian President Ahmed al-Sharaa on public international trips.

On 13 February 2026, al-Shaibani and SDF Commander-in-Chief Mazloum Abdi met U.S. Secretary of State Marco Rubio on the sidelines of the Munich Security Conference. The meeting marked one of the highest-level encounters between the two Syrian leaders and a U.S. official since the war in areas held by Kurdish-majority forces ended with an integration agreement.

==== Syrian transitional government ====
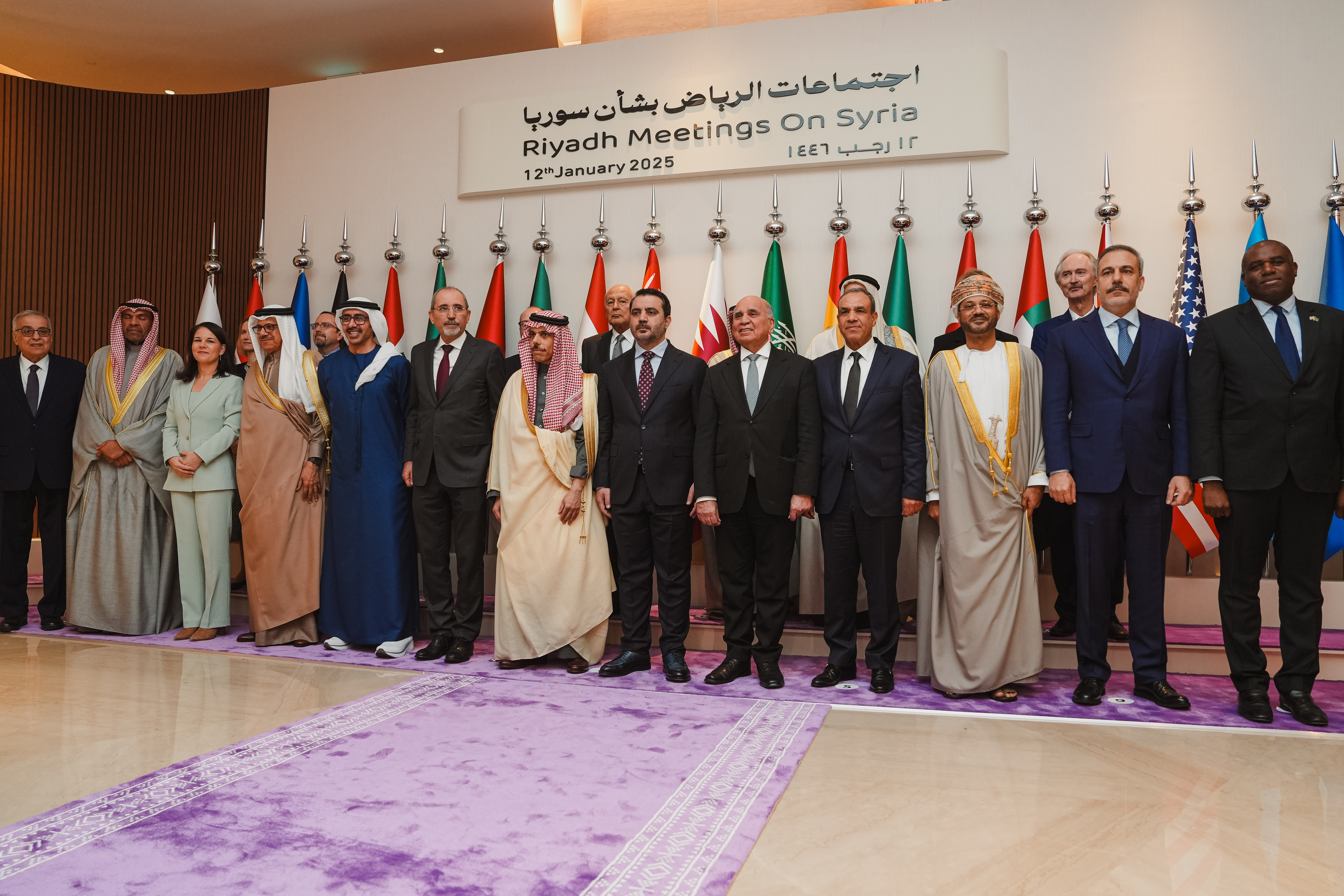
Al-Shaibani participated in the Riyadh meeting on Syria in Saudi Arabia, January 2025

On 29 March 2025, a transitional government was formed, in which al-Shaibani maintained his position. On 25 April, al-Shaibani raised the new Syrian flag during a ceremony at the United Nations Headquarters in New York, where he was also scheduled to attend a United Nations Security Council.

On 4 November, al-Shaibani decided to reinstate 21 diplomats who had defected from the regime of former President Bashar al-Assad, describing the move as "an important step to restore national competencies."

==== Israel ====
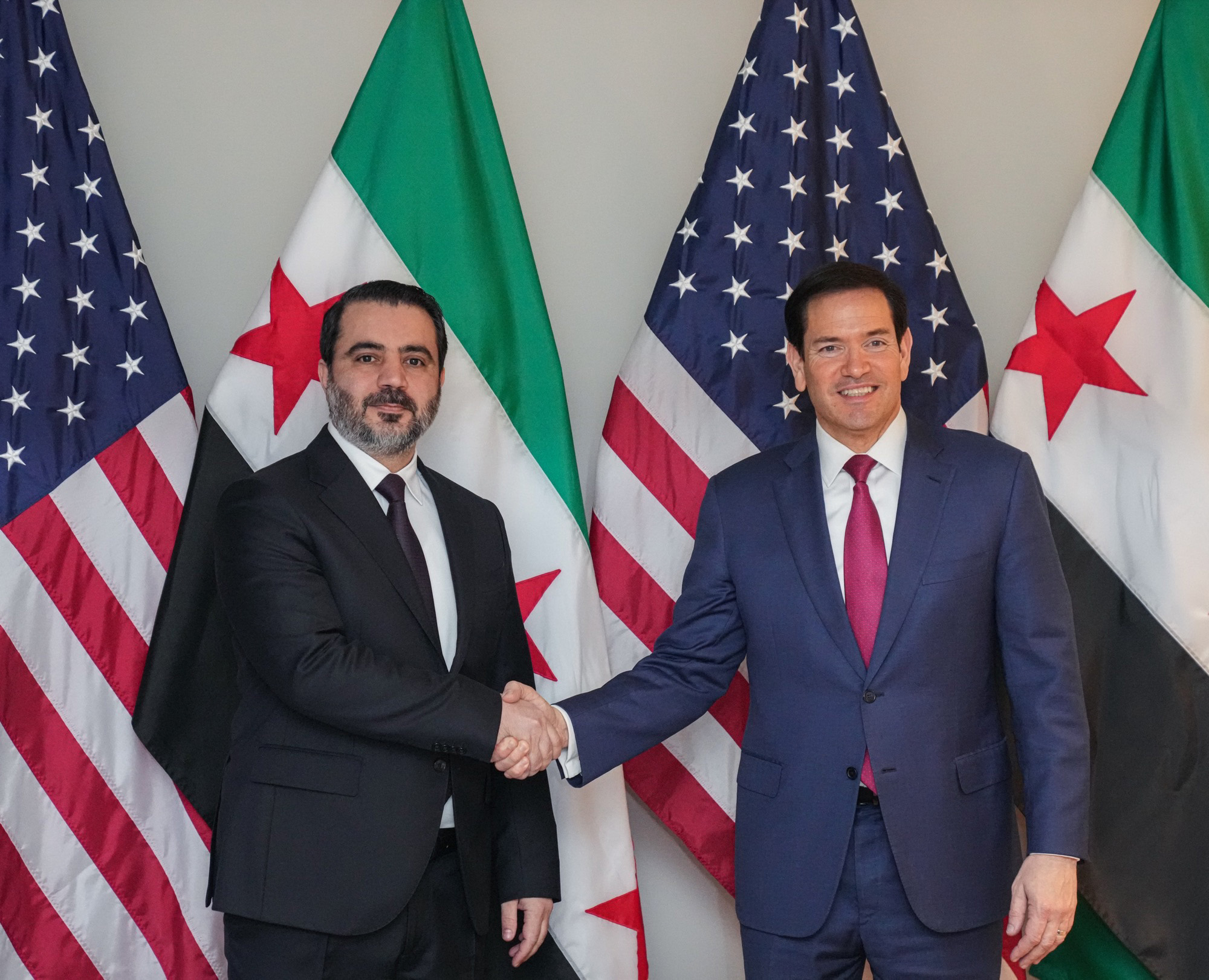
Al-Shibani met with U.S. Secretary of State Marco Rubio, 13 February 2026

On 5 January 2026, al-Shaibani and the head of the General Intelligence Service, Hussein al-Salama along with their delegation met with Israeli officials in Paris, France in order to discuss of reaching a security agreement and to defuse the tensions between the two countries. The talks were mediated and led by the Tom Barrack, the United States ambassador to Turkey. According to the Associated Press, an anonymous Syrian official stated that Syria is seeking "the withdrawal of Israeli forces to the lines prior to 8 December 2024 within the framework of a reciprocal security agreement that prioritizes full Syrian sovereignty and guarantees the prevention of any form of interference in the country's internal affairs."

==== Global coalition to defeat ISIS ====
On 9 February 2026, al-Shaibani and General Intelligence Service director Hussein al-Salama took part in the meeting of Political Directors of the Global Coalition to Defeat ISIS, which was held in Riyadh, the capital of Saudi Arabia.

==== Visits to Russia, Lebanon, and China ====
In July 2025, al-Shaibani became the first official of the post-Assad Syrian government to visit Russia, where he held meetings with foreign minister Sergey Lavrov and president Vladimir Putin in Moscow.

On 10 October 2025, al-Shaibani paid an official visit to Beirut, where he met with President Joseph Aoun, Prime Minister Nawaf Salam, and Foreign Minister Youssef Rajji. Discussions focused on border management, the return of refugees, missing persons, and the situation of detained Syrians in Lebanon. It was the first high-profile Syrian visit to Lebanon since the overthrow of Bashar al-Assad's government in December 2024.

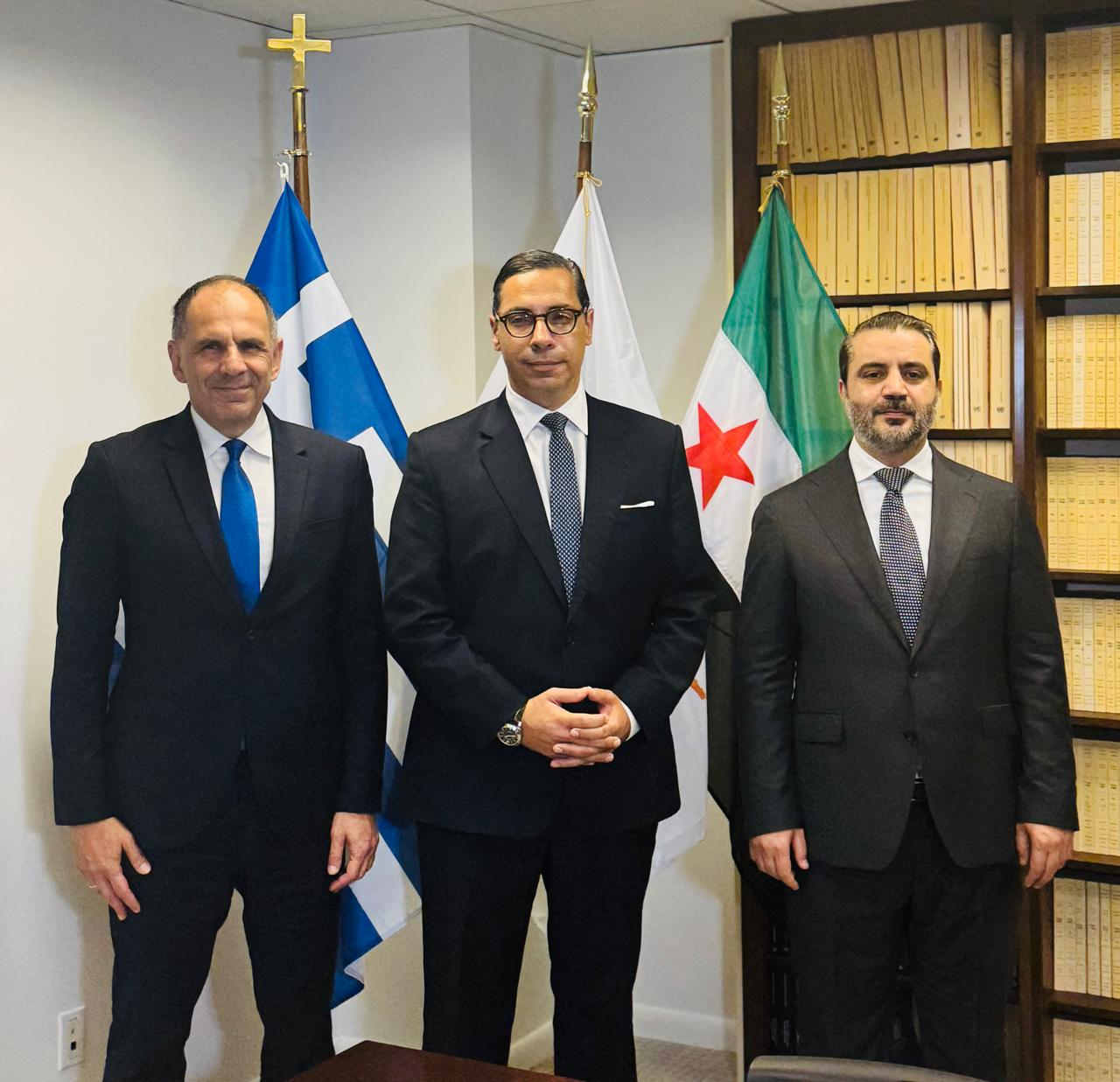
Al-Shaibani with Greek Foreign Minister Giorgos Gerapetritis and Cypriot Foreign Minister Constantinos Kombos, September 2025

In November 2025, al-Shaibani visited China, where he met with Chinese Foreign Minister Wang Yi and Central Political and Legal Affairs Commission Secretary Chen Wenqing. While meeting Wang, al-Shaibani announced that Syria continued to adhere to one China, recognizing the People's Republic of China as the sole legitimate government representing China, including Taiwan. He also praised Xi Jinping's Belt and Road Initiative, Global Development, Security, Civilization, and Governance initiatives, and promised that Syria would not be a source of threat to China and would not let any entity use Syrian territory for actions against Chinese interests. Al-Shaibani met on 17 November in Beijing with several members of the Syrian community residing in China, and the head of the General Intelligence Directorate, Hussein al-Salama, also attended the meeting.

On 23 December, al-Shaibani and Minister of Defense Murhaf Abu Qasra met in Moscow with Putin to discuss a range of political, military, and economic issues of mutual interest, with particular emphasis on strategic cooperation in the military industries sector.

==== Visits to Iraq, the United Kingdom, Morocco, Egypt and Algeria ====
On 14 March 2025, al-Shaibani arrived in Baghdad for an unannounced visit. The visit was initially scheduled for 22 February but was postponed without an official explanation from either side. It was al-Shaibani's first visit to the country since the toppling of Bashar al-Assad.

On 12 November 2025, al-Shaibani made his first official visit to the United Kingdom for talks with British officials on bilateral and regional issues. The Embassy of Syria, London was reopened the following day, with al-Shaibani raising the new Syrian flag over the embassy building.

In May 2026, the Syrian transitional government expressed support for Morocco's territorial integrity during a visit by al-Shibani to Rabat, where he reopened Syria’s embassy in Morocco. In a joint statement, Syria welcomed United Nations Security Council Resolution 2797, which supports Morocco’s autonomy plan, describing it as a turning point toward a political solution to the dispute. The visit marked the first by a senior Syrian official to Morocco since the fall of Bashar al-Assad in December 2024. On 3 May, al-Shaibani met Egyptian Foreign Minister Badr Abdelatty in Cairo during his first visit to Egypt since the fall of the former government. The two sides discussed strengthening bilateral relations and regional developments.

On 3 June 2026, al-Shaibani arrived in Algeria, accompanied by General Intelligence Service chief Hussein al-Salama, during the first visit by a senior Syrian official since the fall of the Bashar al-Assad regime. Al-Shaibani met with Algerian President Abdelmadjid Tebboune the following day in the presence of al-Salama. According to the Syrian Foreign Ministry, the meeting focused on strengthening bilateral relations between the two countries, expanding areas of cooperation, and exchanging views on regional and international developments. Al-Shaibani also met with Algerian Foreign Minister Ahmed Attaf to discuss bilateral relations and regional and international developments, particularly those affecting the region.

==== United States ====
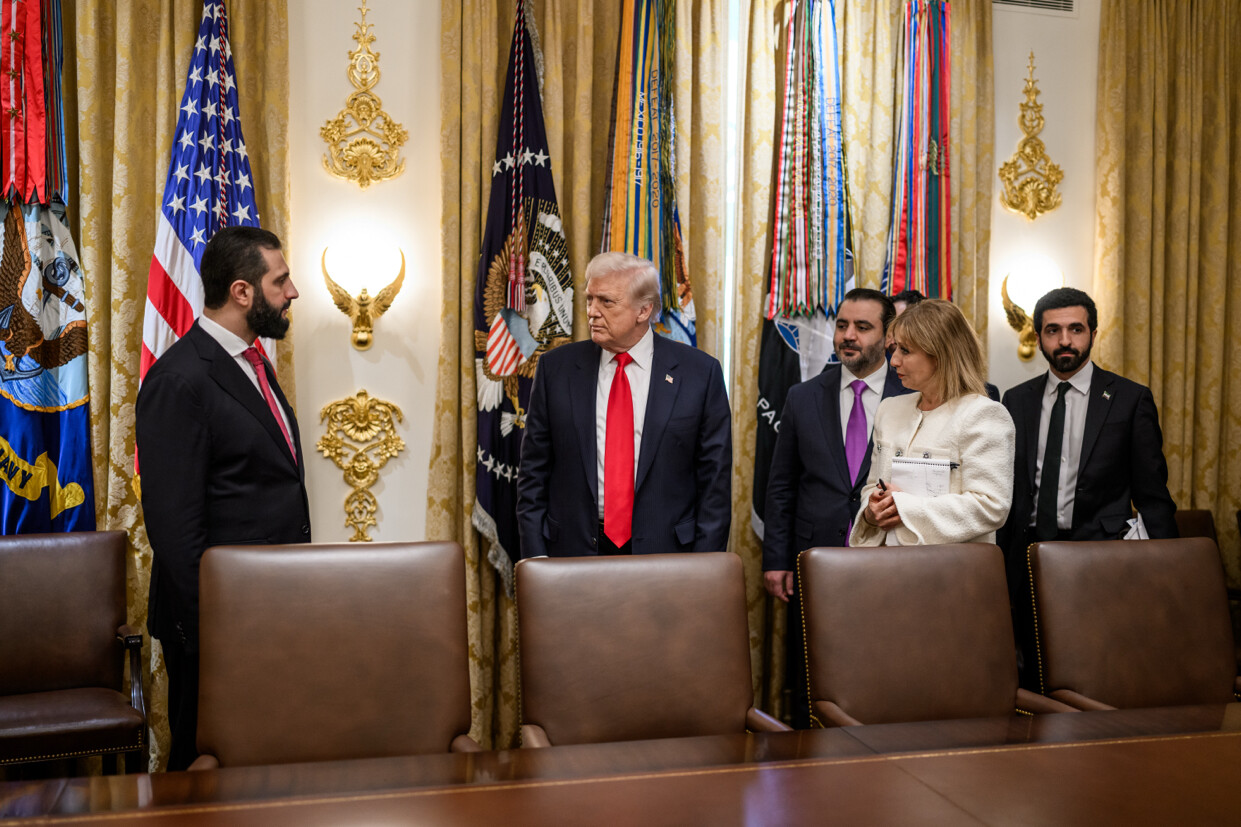
Al-Shaibani and Syria’s UN Ambassador Ibrahim Olabi (right) with Syrian President Ahmed al-Sharaa and U.S. President Donald Trump (left) at the White House, November 2025

On 23 January 2025, al-Shaibani said that the second administration of Donald Trump had been in contact with the Syrian caretaker government. Speaking at the World Economic Forum in Davos, he confirmed that Trump’s team had reached out but declined to disclose what had been discussed.

On 15 May 2025, al-Shaibani held a meeting with U.S. Secretary of State Marco Rubio in Antalya, Turkey. The meeting took place two days after U.S. President Donald Trump announced his decision to lift sanctions on Syria and initiate the normalization of bilateral relations. On 18 September, al-Shaibani visited Washington, D.C. to attend meetings with the World Bank and the International Monetary Fund, and to meet with Israeli delegations and U.S. Secretary of State Marco Rubio, marking the first time a Syrian official had visited the United States in 25 years. On 20 September, al-Shaibani raised the Syrian flag at the Syrian embassy in Washington, D.C. for the first time since the mission was suspended in 2012.

On 25 September, al-Shaibani participated in an open interview with Fareed Zakaria during an event hosted by the Council on Foreign Relations in New York City, on the sidelines of the 80th session of the United Nations General Assembly. The discussion focused on regional developments, U.S.–Syria relations, and Syria’s diplomatic priorities, including sovereignty, sanctions relief, global partnerships, and foreign policy goals, as well as governance, security, minority protection, economic recovery, and the country’s reintegration into the international community.

==== South Korea ====
On 10 April 2025, South Korean Foreign Minister Cho Tae-yul visited Damascus and met with al-Shaibani. During the meeting, both sides signed a formal agreement to establish diplomatic relations, which included plans to open embassies and exchange diplomatic missions. The agreement made Syria the last United Nations member state, outside of North Korea, to establish diplomatic relations with South Korea.

== Political positions ==
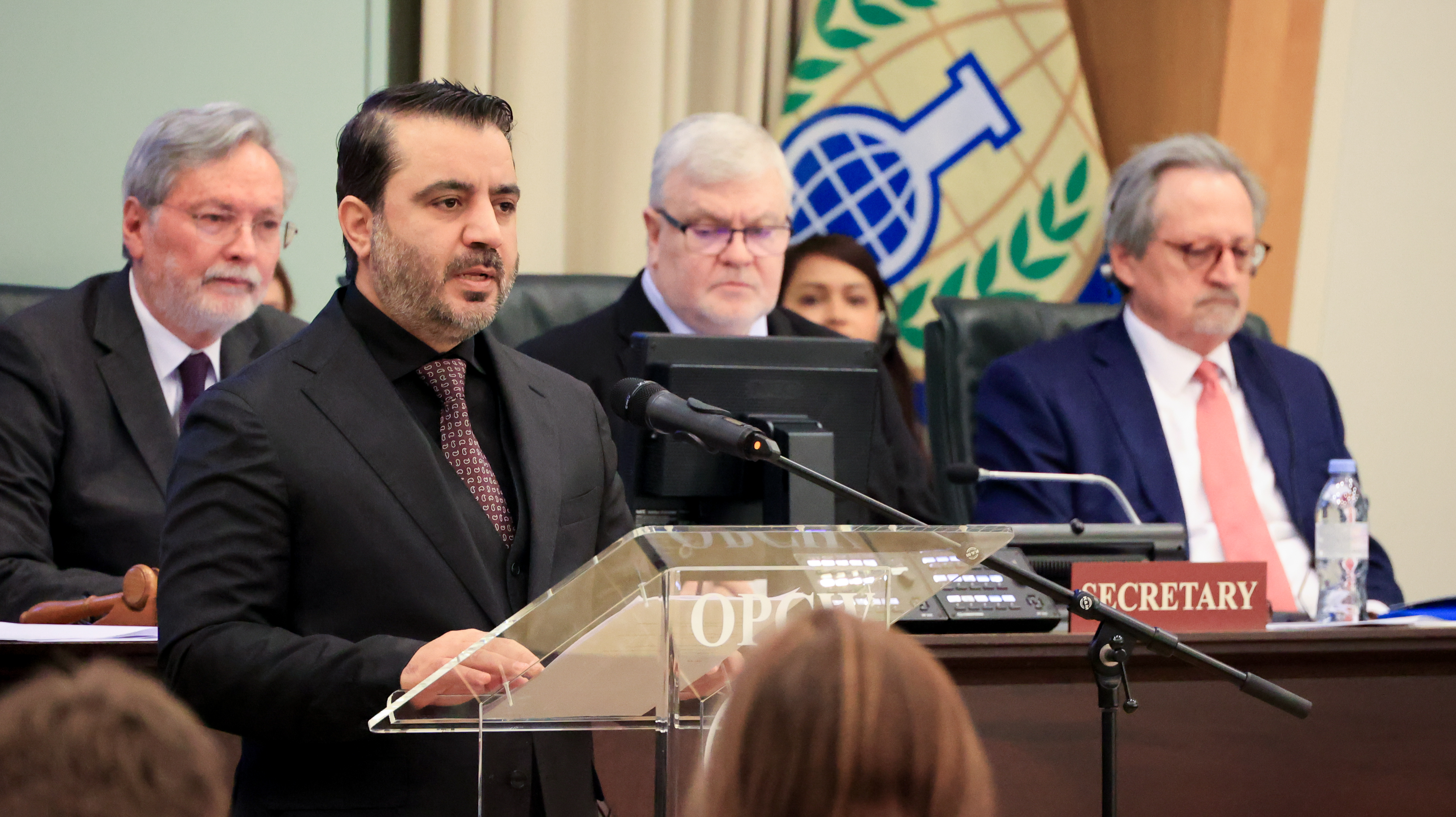
Al-Shaibani addressed the 108th Session of the Executive Council at the Organisation for the Prohibition of Chemical Weapons in The Hague, 5 March 2025.

In October 2025, al-Shaibani warned during an interview with Al Ekhbariya that Israel was "pursuing expansionist projects, exploiting recent changes in Syria, and destabilizing the region." Al-Shaibani stressed the urgent implementation of the 10 March agreement to integrate the Syrian Democratic Forces into state institutions. He said delays would harm civilians and slow the return of displaced people, while reaffirming that Syria rejects any form of division or federalism as “non-negotiable.”

On 7 December 2025, al-Shaibani stated that Damascus would not enter a security agreement with Israel unless it fully withdrew from the areas it had occupied after 8 December 2024. Speaking at the Doha Forum in Doha, al-Shaibani emphasized that a security agreement was impossible while Israel controlled parts of Syrian territory and that the borders should be restored to their status as of 7 December 2024.

On 13 November, al-Shaibani visited Chatham House in the United Kingdom for his first public event, where he discussed UK–US relations, minority rights, and Syria's commitment to inclusive governance with Chair Simon Fraser. He said the government is pursuing pluralism despite post-war challenges, described Israel as a negative influence while expressing openness to dialogue, and outlined a pragmatic foreign policy aimed at rebuilding trust after the former Bashar al-Assad, including relations with Russia.

On 14 February 2026, al-Shaibani said Syria has made progress despite significant challenges, emphasizing efforts to rebuild state institutions and restore trust between the government and the people. Speaking on the sidelines of the Munich Security Conference, he said the former regime’s years of mismanagement left the country devastated by war and socially divided. He added that the state has consolidated control over weapons and is focusing on reconstruction, reunification, and recovery. Al-Shaibani stressed that the government accepts responsibility for events in Suwayda and places national unity first, describing Syria’s diversity as a source of strength. He also expressed concern over Israeli actions since 8 December 2024, including airstrikes and ground incursions, and said negotiations aim to ensure Israel’s withdrawal and respect for Syria’s sovereignty. He concluded that lifting sanctions is essential to rebuilding the country, facilitating the return of refugees, and establishing inclusive institutions for Syria’s future.

== Assassination attempts ==
On 12 February 2026, the United Nations and its secretary-general, António Guterres, said that Ahmed al-Sharaa, along with Anas Khattab and al-Shaibani, were the targets of five foiled Islamic State and Saraya Ansar al-Sunnah assassination attempts within the previous year on their lives.

== See also ==
- Foreign relations of Syria
- Politics of Syria
- Cabinet of Syria
