= Cinema of Syria =

- No. of screens: 5 (2011)
  - Per capita: 0.1 Per 100,000
- Main distributors: Al-Fardos Drama, Sama Art

Produced feature films (2006)
- Fictional: 4
- Animated: –
- Documentary: 1

Cinema of Syria (Arabic: السينما السورية, romanized: Alsiynāmā ạl-Sūriyah) refers to film production in Syria since its independence from France in 1946.

Cinema started in the French Mandate for Syria in 1928 with the screening of Al-Muttaham al-Bari (The Innocent Suspect), the country's first feature film. Nearly a century later, filmmaker Feras Fayyad became the first Syrian to be nominated for an Academy Award, with Last Men in Aleppo earning a nomination for Best Documentary Feature at the 2018 Oscars.

== History ==
=== Beginnings in the 1900s ===
The country's first film was screened at a café in Aleppo in 1908. Eight years later, the Ottoman administration under Jamal Pasha opened the first movie theater in Damascus, but it was burned down a month later.

=== 1910s ===
In 1912, the owner of a café in Marjeh Square of Damascus, Habib Al-Shammas, showed a film using a manual machine with acetylene gas-generated lamp illumination.

In 1916 Jamal Pasha, the Ottoman ruler of Syria known as Al-Saffah, established the first cinema hall in Damascus on Salihiya Street. Named Çanakkale in commemoration of the Ottoman victory in World War I, this venue showcased diverse films, including the German army's parade in Berlin. Despite its popularity, Çanakkale was also burned down.

A Greek man who had worked there approached a cafe owner in Marjeh Square about opening another venue. Recognizing the public demand, the proprietor embraced the idea, marking the inception of "The Rose of Damascus" cinema hall. Initially featuring French police and comedy films, the hall's success led to further investment in the sector.

This collaboration led to the proliferation of cinemas in Damascus, with subsequent establishments capitalizing on the industry. The film repertoire expanded to include American cowboy films and narratives about Mexican gangs. With the French occupation of Damascus, the cinematic landscape underwent a transformation, gradually replacing cowboy films with French productions. The trend extended to Aleppo and the Syrian provinces, aligning with the cinematic developments in the capital city.

=== 1920s ===
In 1928 Al-Mutaham al-Bari (The Innocent Suspect) was released, a silent black-and-white feature film directed, written, and produced by Rasheed Jalal in collaboration with Ahmed Tello. This was the first Syrian feature film, produced by the first Syrian production company, Hermon Film.

Inspired by the cinematic experiences they had witnessed in local halls, a group of amateurs, including Ayoub Badri, Ahmed Tello, and Muhammad Al-Muradi, envisioned producing Syrian films. In 1928, lacking experience and technical knowledge, they collaborated with photographer Rashid Jalal to produce Al-Mutaham al-Bari. Using a small cinematography device imported from Germany, the filmmakers produced a film that was shot on an 800-meter tape over eight months. It drew inspiration from real incidents during King Faisal's reign, portraying a gang of thieves causing havoc in Damascus. Upon completion, efforts to showcase the film faced a setback when French authorities refused a license due to the inclusion of a Muslim actress, citing concerns from clerics about potential public unrest. In response, the filmmakers replaced the actress with a German dancer, re-filming her scenes.

=== 1930s ===
Mustafa Hilal was Syria's first professional actor. Internal conflicts led to the dissolution of the film company Hermon Film despite the success of their debut film, Al-Mutaham al-Bari. Responding to the growing film industry, Rashid Jalal and Ismail Anzour parted ways to establish the Helios Film company in 1931. In 1933 Tahta Sama' Dimashq (Under the Damascus Sky), involving an Italian photographer, foreign actors and dancers was released. Because of its boldness and copyright infringement of its musical score, the film was not a commercial success and was overshadowed by the Egyptian musical Hymn of the Heart.

Complications persisted as French authorities banned Under the Damascus Sky, directed by Ismail Anzour, who had studied filmmaking in Vienna and returned home to work on Syria's second film. Faced with additional adversity from French authorities, Syrian filmmakers, including Ismail Anzour, explored opportunities in Cairo.

One noteworthy film from this time is Nedaa al-Wajeb (1937), directed by Ayoub al-Badri. This film is the first Syrian movie to explicitly mention the Palestinian Cause, addressing the Arab Revolt in Palestine against British occupation. Al-Badri had also directed Al-Muttaham al-Baree.

=== 1940s ===
In 1943, Cinema Dimashq with 1,500 seats and ranking among the largest movie theaters in the Eastern Mediterranean, opened its doors in Damascus. In 1947 Nazih Shabandar established a production studio equipped with his own inventions. The next year witnessed the production of the first Syrian sound movie, Nur wa Thalam (Light and Darkness), featuring emerging Syrian stars Rafiq Shukri, Yevett Feghli, and Anwar el Baba.

In the 1940s several Syrian films addressed the Palestinian cause, although a comprehensive archive of early Syrian cinema from this period is lacking. Surviving films from the 1930s, 1940s, and 1950s represent only a small fraction of the production. The primary means of uncovering films from this era is through printed sources in archives, particularly books dedicated to archiving and reviewing cinema.

While references to Syrian and Arab cinema in the 1940s often overlook films related to the Palestinian cause, there are notable exceptions. One such film is al-Jaysh al-Souri fel Maydan (1949), produced by Ahmed Irfan. This work focuses on the Syrian army's role in the 1948 Palestine war, exemplifying a thematic emphasis on the Palestinian cause during that decade.

Syrian siblings Asmahan and Farid Al-Atrash were renowned singers and actors and became film stars in Egypt and Syria. Later on, Farid Al-Atrash extended his career to include Lebanese films.

=== 1950s ===
During the 1950s Syria witnessed a growing professionalisation of filmmakers and actors. Actors in Syrian-Lebanese productions, like Anwar el-Baba (uncle of Soad Hosny), Rafiq Shukri, and Yvette Feghali became prominent names in the film industry. In 1950 the company Irfan and Jaliq was established in Aleppo and produced the film Passer. During this period numerous Syrian actors and actresses relocated to Egypt in pursuit of their career. Hala Shawkat became a rising star in Egypt. The 1951 American film Sirocco, set in Syria and starring Humphrey Bogart and Märta Torén, was filmed on location in Damascus.

=== 1960s ===
In the 1960s, the Syrian film industry underwent significant improvements, catalyzed by the success of the comedic duo formed by Duraid Lahham and Nuhad al-Qala'i. Their lucrative film series, commencing with Aqd al-Lulu (Necklace of Pearls) in 1964 marked a pivotal shift, coinciding with the establishment of the General Organization for Cinema in 1963, operating under the Ministry of Culture. In the aftermath of the Six-Day War and Syria's loss of the Golan Heights, the organization acquired a strict monopoly over film production and distribution, reshaping the industry landscape.

Despite facing challenges in distribution and fluctuating profits, the industry gained recognition through the comedic contributions of Lahham and al-Qala'i.

In 1963, in conjunction with the Ba'athist takeover of Syria, the establishment of the National Film Organization sought to foster a distinct national identity for Syrian films. This initiative brought back Syrian talents from Cairo. Additionally, Syrian filmmakers began incorporating Egyptian and Lebanese actors, diversifying the talent pool and enriching cinematic narratives.

Zuhair Shawa played a pivotal role by completing the first Syrian film, The Green Valley, entirely within the country in 1963. He attempted a film on Palestine called Behind the Borders in 1963, and later directed The Devil's Game in 1966.

The unity established between Syria and Egypt in 1960 led to the creation of the Department of Cinema and Photography, headed by Salah Dahni. Known for his film criticism, Dahni organized the first Arab film festival in 1956 during his tenure at the Damascus International Fair.

Moreover, the Syrian film industry began to incorporate foreign influences, with filmmakers integrating French icons and engaging in productions with Yugoslavian and Italian collaborations. This strategic approach contributed to the industry's global appeal and furthered its artistic diversity during this transformative period in the 1960s.

Medea was also filmed in Syria, in the Aleppo Citadel the oldest castle in the world, starring Maria Callas.

=== 1970s ===
The 1970s marked a golden age for Syrian cinema, the 1970s represented a flourishing period for Syrian cinema, characterized by the ascent of Syrian actors and actresses. Amidst heightened guerrilla actions, cinematic narratives evolved to address pressing societal and political issues. Notable films such as Men Under the Sun (1970), centered on the Palestinian issue and resistance, and The Knife (1971) and The Deceived (1973) -or The Dupes-, both inspired by Ghassan Kanafani's stories, contributed to the cultural landscape.

However, this era also witnessed a turning point with the production of The Leopard (1972), based on Haider Haider's story. Despite its exploration of the farmer-feudal lord relationship, the film faced severe criticism for some seductive scenes, marking a notable shift in Syrian cinema.

Filmmaker Mohamed Shaheen explored societal issues and romantic relationships in Another Face of Love (1973), aiming to depict daily life artistically. Notable films of this era which includes collaborations of Salah Zulfikar in Syrian film industry includes Memory of a Night of Love (1973), with Nelly, Mariam Fakhr Eddine, Muna Wassef, Rafik Subaie, Hala Shawkat and others, the film was a box-office hit. The era saw an increase in literary adaptations, including the Shame Trilogy (1974) and films like Al-Yazirli (1974) and The Adventure (1974). Dancer on the Wounds released in 1974 featuring Ighraa and Youssef Hanna.

The Syrian-Egyptian film Al-Rajul al-Munaseb came out in 1970. In 1971, the first Syrian-Turkish movie was released, Ghawwar La'eb al-Koura, starring Duraid Lahham and Nihad Qali. Syrian-Egyptian film Nisaa Lil Shitaa starring Syrian actor Rafiq Sibayi came out in 1974. The Message filmed some parts in Syria, also starring Syrian actress Muna Wassef, with Syrian director Moustapha Akkad.

The 1970s also witnessed the rise of Syrian actresses, including Ighraa who notably became the first actress to appear nude in the Middle East. Syrian cinema achieved continued success with films like The Leopard (1972) and Dancer on the Wounds (1974), starring the acclaimed duo Duraid Lahham and Nuhad al-Qala'i.

Noteworthy collaborations included Egyptian actress Nelly in The Sinners (1975) and Lebanese actors, such as Iman (Liz Sarkissian) who appeared in When the Wives Are Away (1975) who also starred French icon Muriel Montousse. Walid Tawfiq, a Lebanese actor who appeared in Fish Without Hasak, produced by Samir Anini in 1978, starring Sabah Al-Jazairi, Duraid Lahham and Karim Abu Shakra. The Sinners produced by the Damascus Cinema Company in 1975. The same story of the movie was re-presented by Adel Imam in Egyptian cinema in 1980 in a movie titled Hell.

The decade also featured various films and actors, including Ziad Mawlawi, Samira Tawfiq, Mahmoud Saeed, Duraid Lahham, Nihad Qalai.

=== 1980s ===
In 1981 was released Banat Al Karate featuring the talented Syrian actress Ighraa. In 1982, Al-Hudood starred Duraid Lahham, Rashid Assaf, and Raghda. The plot unfolds as a traveler loses his passport between two countries, leaving him stranded in a neutral zone, compelling him to devise a strategy for crossing into the next country or finding a way back home.

The year 1984 marked the release of Dreams of the City, a film featuring Ayman Zeidan. Moving forward to 1987, a Soviet-Syrian collaboration resulted in the creation of The Last Night of Scheherazade, a children's fantasy film directed by Takhir Sabirov. Inspired by "One Thousand and One Nights", this film concluded a trilogy that included "New Tales of Scheherazade" and "And Another Night of Scheherazade."

In the same year, the Syrian documentary film The Dream emerged, directed by Mohammad Malas. Comprising a series of interviews with Palestinian refugees in Lebanon during the civil war, the film explores the dreams these refugees experienced while asleep, providing a poignant perspective on their lives and aspirations.

=== 1990s ===
During the 1990s, a pivotal era preceding the golden age of Syrian cinema, Maraya emerged as one of the decade's standout successes, achieving the status of a classic. Notably, The Night, a 1992 film set in Quneitra and centered around the Arab-Israeli conflict, played a significant role in shaping the cinematic landscape. In 1993, it made history as the first Syrian feature to be showcased at the prestigious New York Film Festival, featuring performances by Fares Al-Helou and Sabah Jazairi.

Another notable contribution to Syrian cinema during this period was Al-Kompars, directed by Nabil Maleh and featuring the talents of Bassam Kousa and Samar Sami. This film added to the diverse cinematic offerings of the era.

In the documentary genre, On a Day of Ordinary Violence, My Friend Michel Seurat... directed by Omar Amiralay, served as an elegy to the sociologist Michel Seurat. Seurat met a tragic end after being abducted by Islamic Jihad, a precursor to Hezbollah, in Lebanon in 1985. This documentary shed light on his life and the circumstances surrounding his untimely death.

Furthermore, There Are So Many Things Still to Say, another documentary by director Omar Amiralay, took inspiration from an interview with the Syrian playwright Saadallah Wannous.

=== 2000s ===
The 2000s, unfolded as the golden age of Syrian cinema, marked by influential releases like Bab al-Hara, Bokaat Daw, and the notable rise of Syrian actors, including Sulaf Fawakherji, Sulafa Memar, Jummana Mourad, Dima Kandalaft, and Amal Arfa.

In 2006, Ala Tool al-Ayam brought together eminent Syrian actors, such as Sulaf Fawakherji, Taim Hassan, Ayman Zeidan, and Maxim Khalil. Bab al-Hara, a classic series, garnered immense popularity, particularly during the sacred month of Ramadan. The show starred Sulaf Fawakherji and Sulafa Memar.

In 2008 was released Dayaa Dayaa, featuring Bassem Yakhour and Nidal Sigri, and in 2009, Sabaya in 2009e.

=== 2010s ===
As the Syrian Civil War commenced, this period witnessed a significant disruption in the production of numerous shows. The conflict, which began in 2011, had a profound impact on the entertainment industry, leading to the cessation of several television programs.

By 2015, the landscape of Syrian television underwent a notable shift, exemplified by shows like Bokaat Daw, which approached the Syrian Civil War with humor. Notably, some shows creatively addressed the shortage of male actors due to military conscription, featuring storylines where women assumed traditionally male roles, and highlighting the impact of wartime circumstances on daily life. Senne Oula Zawaj, released in 2017, emerged as a major success, showcasing the notable performances of Dana Jabr and Yazan Al Sayed. During the same period, Syrian cinema also reached unprecedented international visibility. Filmmaker Feras Fayyad became the first Syrian director to receive an Academy Award nomination, and remains the only Syrian filmmaker to have been nominated twice, for Last Men in Aleppo (2017) and The Cave (2019), marking a significant moment for Syrian representation in global cinema.

=== 2020s ===
In the 2020s, numerous Lebanese television productions prominently featured Syrian actors during this period, contributing to a collaborative and cross-cultural exchange within the region.

Simultaneously, Syrian production companies experienced a certain revitalization. One notable production that exemplified this was Al-Khaen, featuring the talents of Sulafa Memar, Qays Sheikh Najeeb, and Maram Ali.

Syrian actors and actresses found substantial roles in Lebanese shows, further enhancing their presence and influence in the broader Arab television landscape. For instance, the Lebanese series Lal Mot included performances by Syrian actors such as Mohmmad al-Ahmad, Khaled Al-Qish, and Sabah Jazairi in its initial seasons. The third season of the show introduced new cast members, including Meyhar Khaddour and Yamen Hajali.

== Syrian Oscar Nominees and Contributors ==
- Last Men In Aleppo (2017), By Feras Fayyad
- Of Fathers And Sons (2018) By Talal Derki
- The Cave (2019), By Feras Fayyad
- For Sama (2019), By Waad Al-Kateab

== Festivals and film awards ==
The Damascus International Film Festival is a biennial film event held in November and organized by the Syrian government since 1979. The late Syrian film director Muhammad Shahin founded the festival, which occurs in alternating years with the Carthage Film Festival. Originally centered on films from Arab countries, Latin America, and Asia until 1999, the festival shifted its focus to international cinema in 2001.

=== Major award winners ===
Year	Best Film (Gold Prize)	Best Actor	Best Actress
1979; 1st	(Tunisia) Sun of the Hyenas (Iraq) Fences		
1981; 2nd	(Cuba) The Survivors (Ba'athist Syria) Fragments		
1983; 3rd	(Algeria) Last of Presents		
1985; 4th	(Turkey) Remedy	(Algeria) Syed Ali Koirat for Kingdom of Dreams	(Egypt) Naglaa Fathi for Sorry, Law
1987; 5th	(Cuba) A Successful Man	(Egypt) Ahmed Zaki for The Wife of an Important Man	(China) Pan Hong for The Last Empress (India) Mahua Roychoudhury for Man and Woman
1989; 6th	(Ba'athist Syria) Nights of the Jackal	(Ba'athist Syria) Assaad Feddah for Nights of the Jackal	(Algeria) Fatima Belhadj for The Citadel
1991; 7th	(Cuba) Supporting Roles (Egypt) The Kit Kat	(Egypt) Mahmoud Abdel Aziz for The Kit Kat	(Cuba) Luisa Pérez Nieto for Supporting Roles
1993; 8th	(Chile) The Frontier	(Tunisia) Abdellatif Kechiche for Bezness	(India) Dimple Kapadia for The Mourner
1995; 9th	(Chile) Amnesia	(Ba'athist Syria) Tayser Idris for Rising Rain (Algeria) Mohamed Ali Allalou for Youssef: The Legend of the Seventh Sleeper	(Tunisia) Amel Hédhili for The Silences of the Palace (Egypt) Lucy for The Stolen Joy
1997; 10th	(Brazil) Tieta of Agreste (Egypt) The Captain		(China) Tao Hong for Colors of the Blind
1999; 11th	(Egypt) Fallen Angels Paradise		(Chile) Tamara Acosta for The Revenge
2001; 12th	(Norway) (United Kingdom) Aberdeen	(Belgium) Josse De Pauw for Everybody's Famous!	(Italy) Licia Maglietta for Bread and Tulips
2003; 13th	(Japan) Dolls		
2005; 14th	(Argentina) Little Sky		
2007; 15th	(Iran) That Winter	(Argentina) Julio Chávez for The Other	(Lebanon) All actresses for Caramel
2008; 16th	(Czech Republic) Empties	(Iran) Reza Naji for The Song of Sparrows	(France) Kristin Scott Thomas for I've Loved You So Long
2009; 17th	(South Korea) Treeless Mountain	(Russia) Vladimir Ilyin & (Russia) Aleksey Vertkov for Ward No. 6	(Italy) Giovanna Mezzogiorno for Victory
2010; 18th	(France) (Algeria) (Tunisia) (Belgium) Outside the Law	(Romania) George Piştereanu for If I Want to Whistle, I Whistle	(Germany) Gabriela Maria Schmeide for The Hairdresser

== Notable films ==
Title	Transliteration	Year	Director
Dancer on the Wounds	Raqasa Ealaa Al-Juruh'	1974	Muhammad Shahin
The Adventure	Al-Mughamara	1974	Muhammad Shahin
Another Face of Love	Wajh Akhar Min Al-Hubi'	1973	Muhammad Shahin
The Cheetah	Al-Fahd	1972	Nabil Maleh
Al-Kompars	Al-Kambaris	1993	Nabil Maleh
The Night	Al-Layl	1992	Mohammad Malas
Al-Hodoud	Al-Hudood	1982	Duraid Lahham
Akd Al Lulu	Akd Al Lulu	1964	Youssef Maalouf
Kafroun	Kafroun	1990	Duraid Lahham
When Wives Are Absent	Eindama Tughib Al-Zawjat	1975	Marwan Akawi
Jewels of James Bond	Ghawar James Bond	1974	Nabil Maleh
Everyday Life in a Syrian Village	Al-Hayaat Al-Yawmiat Fi Qaryat Suria	1974	Omar Amiralay
Dreams of the City	Ahlam Al-Madina	1984	Mohammad Malas
The Innocent Suspect	Al-Mutaham Al-Bari	1928	Rasheed Jalal
Under the Damascus Sky	Tahta Sama' Dimashq	1934	Ismail Anzour
Karate Girls	Banat Al Karate	1981	Ighraa
Fish Without Bones	Samak Bedoun Hasak	1978	Samir El-Ghoseini
The Sinners	Al-Khuta	1975	Saifuddin Shawkat
Oriental girl	Bint Sharqia	1986	Mohammad Shaheen
Fake Love	Habun Muzayaf	1980	Muhammad Shahin
The Shame	El Aar	1974	Wadie Youssef
Showgirls	Eard Al-Banat	1987	Ighraa
Reluctant Girls	Al-Fatayat Al-Mutaradidat	1982	Ghannam Ghannam
Girls for Love	Al Banat Lal Al-Hubi	1974	Reda Myassar
I'll Die Twice and Love You	Fa'amut Maratayn Wa'Uhibuk	1976	George Lotfi Al-Khoury
Goodbye to Yesterday	Wdaeaan Lil'Ams	1977	Mohammad Shahin
The Beautiful Journalist	Al-Sahafiat Al-Jamila	1977	George Lotfi Al-Khoury
Home Sweet Home	Al-Bayt Al-Saeid	1977	George Lotfi Al-Khoury
Those Who Came from the Seas	Al Ja'uu Min Al-Bahar	1977	Saifuddin Shawkat
One Man Wanted	Matlub Rajul Wahid	1973	Osama Malkany
The Flirtation of Girls	Ghazal Al Banat	1949	Anwar Wagdi
A Woman Who Lives Alone	Imra'a Taskon Wahdaha	1971	Nagdy Hafez
Naked Without Sin	Eariat Bala Khatiya	1967	Costantine Kostanof
Blazing Nights	Al-Layali Al-Mushtaeila	1960	Mohammad Shahin
A Woman of Fire	Imra' Min Nar	1971	Reda Mayser
Forbidden Love	Al-Hubu Al-Mamnue	1976	Khaled Hamada
Lovers	Eashaq	1978	Marwan Akawi
Postman	Saei Al-Barid	1977	Mohammad Abu Al Fath
El Anater District	Haret El Anater	1980	Osama Malkany
The Two Drifters	Al-Ianjirafan	1965	Reda Mayser
Love in Istanbul	Gharam Fi Istanbul	1966	Saifuddin Shawkat
I'm Inter	Ana Antar	1966	Youssef Maalouf
The Most Delicious	Allaz Al-Zareef	1968	Yousef Eisa
Good Morning	Sah Al-Noum	1975	Khaldoon AL-Maleh
Eastern Girl	Fatat Sharqia	1986	Mohammad Shahin
The Island's Devil	Jazziraht Al-Shaytan	1978	Samir El-Ghoseini
Women for the Winter	Nisaa Lal Shita	1974	Samir El Ghoseini
Lovers on the Road	Eushaaq Ealaa Al-Tariq	1977	Bana Al Batea
Memory of a Night of Love	Thikra Laylat Houbb	1973	Seif El-Dine Chawkat
Last Men In Aleppo	Ākhir al-Rijāl fī Ḥalab	2017	Feras Fayyad
The Cave	Al-KAHF	2019	Feras Fayyad

== Notable figures ==
=== Directors ===
- Abdellatif Abdelhamid
- Duraid Lahham
- Ighraa
- Nabil Maleh
- Mohammad Malas
- Moustapha Akkad
- Muhammad Shahin
- Alisar Hasan
- Omar Amiralay
- Ossama Mohammed
- Liwaa Yazji
- Feras Fayyad

=== Actors and actresses ===
- Adib Qaddoura (1948–)
- Antoinette Najeeb (1930–2022)
- Anwar Wagdi (1904–1955)
- Assaad Feddah (1938-)
- Asmahan (1912–1944)
- Anwar Al-Baba (1915–1992)
- Duraid Lahham (1934–)
- Fahd Ballan (1933–1997)
- Farid al-Atrash (1910–1974)
- Ghada El-Shamaa (1959–)
- Hala Shawkat (1930–2007)
- Ighraa (1945–)
- Khaled Taja (1939–2012)
- Lina Bati (1948–)
- Maha Al-Saleh (1945–2008)
- Mahmoud Gabr (1935–2008)
- Malak Sukkar (1946–1992)
- Muna Wassef (1942–)
- Nabila El-Nabulsi (1949–2010)
- Nadia Arslan (1949–2008)
- Nadine Khoury (1959-)
- Nahed Halabi (1954-)
- Najah Hafeez (1941–2017)
- Naji Jaber (1940–2009)
- Nehad Qalei (1928–1993)
- Nourhane (1922–2022)
- Raghda (1957-)
- Rafiq Subaie (1930–2017)
- Sabah Jazairi (1955-)
- Salma Al-Masri (1958-)
- Saleh Al-Hayek (1940-)
- Salim Kallas (1936–2013)
- Salwa Saeed (1935–2000)
- Samar Sami (1956-)
- Samira Tewfik (1935-)
- Shams Al-Baroudi (1945-)
- Talhat Hamdi (1941–2012)
- Taroub (1937-)
- Yoland Asmar (1930–1988)
- Youssef Hanna (1941–1993)
- Zeyad Molouy (1944–1997)

== See also ==
- Arab cinema
- Cinema of the world
- Egyptian cinema
- List of Syrian films

== Literature ==
- Wessels, Joshka (11 July 2019). Documenting Syria: Film-making, Video Activism and Revolution. Bloomsbury Publishing. ISBN 978-1-78831-616-3.
