= Sabah Jazairi =

Syrian actress

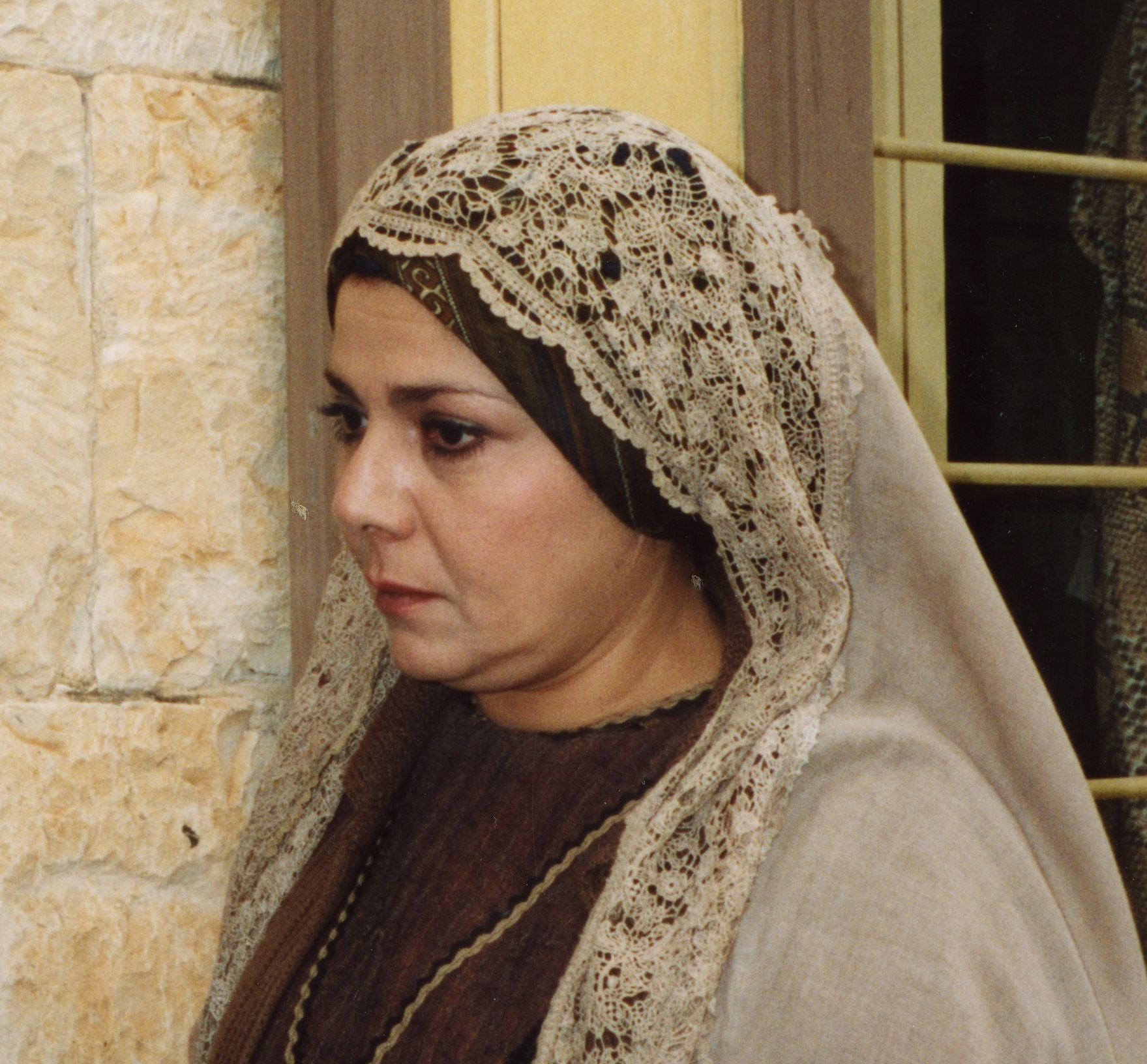
- Syrian artist Sabah Al-Jazairi in a role in the series Rain Song
- Born: Sabah Mohamed Jazairi; January 23, 1957 (age 69); Damascus, Second Syrian Republic
- Occupation: Actress
- Years active: 1972–present
- Known for: Sabah Al Jazairi
- Spouse: Rabah Al Taqi
- Children: Rasha Al Taqi, Taraf Al Taqi, Karam Al Taqi

Sabah Jazairi (Arabic: صباح جزائري) is a veteran Syrian actress who has appeared in numerous drama and television series, comedy shorts, and theatrical plays, including "Al Ababid", "Aa'id ila Haifa" (Returning to Haifa) and Bab Al-Hara (The Alley's Gate). Nicknamed "The Cinderella of the Syrian Screen", Jazairi's long career has spanned over five decades and she has performed in over 80 television series. Throughout her long and illustrious career she has been the recipient of many awards.

== Early life ==
Born to a Damascene family on January 23, 1957, Jazairi's family was no stranger to the entertainment industry in that her own cousin Nibal Al Jazairi was also an actress and her older sister Samia became a respected famous comedian.

== Career ==
Jazairi began her career at the age of 15 in 1972 when she joined the cast of Salt and Sugar, a comedy series, with the likes of celebrated Syrian comedians, Duraid Lahham, Nihad Qalai and Naji Jaber. The following year she starred in the series Primo, which was followed by a performance in Sah Al-Noom; considered one of the most popular Arabic comedy series in the Arab World.

After a brief lull in acting, she returned to the screen in 1979 in various roles in the comedy series Wayne El Ghalt written and directed by Duraid Lahham, who also co-starred with Naji Gabr and her sister, Samia Jazairi.

In 1980 she participated in the series Narrow Paths, and in 1982 she played the role of Qamar in the Jordanian children's series "Qamar of Land and the Sea", which was produced by Qatar TV.

After another brief lull in acting, Jazairi returned in to the screen in 1989, where she appeared alongside the giants Asaad Fedda and Rashid Assaf in the drama series "Warm Hearts". This was followed with a performance in the Jordanian series "Valley of the Deer".

In 1994 she had a special appearance in the first part of the drama series "Al-Akho", with the character of Alia, alongside the giant actors Hani Al-Romani and Jamal Suleiman. Her performance as Nargis in the historical series "Al-Ababid" in 1996 won her many accolades and is considered to be one of her finest performances.

In 1997, she played the role of Sumaya, the wife of Abbad in the historical fantasy series Death Coming from the East, directed by Najda Anzour. At the turn of the twenty-first century, she appeared in many works, the most famous of which was the drama series "Hanin" with the character of Mary, and the comedy series "Time of Silence".

In 2004, she starred in the series "Returning to Haifa", based on a novel by the Palestinian writer Ghassan Kanafani. This was followed by several works, including the social series "Ishtar", in which she played the tender aunt with actress Amal Arafa. Jazairi garnered rave reviews with her performance in the autobiographical series Nizar Qabbani as the mother of the poet Nizar, and the dramatic series "Rajaha" as Hala.

In 2006, during the early seasons of the wildly popular hit series "Bab Al Hara", her fame was elevated to new heights in her role as Suad, which endeared her to new and younger audiences throughout the Arab World, who had previously not heard of Jazairi.

Following the smash-hit Bab Al Hara, Jazairi performed in "People of the Raya" in 2010, the series "Time of Barghout" in 2012, as well as the series "Tahoun al-Shar" with the role of Fakhriya Khanum in the same year "Perfume Al-Sham" as Umm Jameel in 2016. She also starred in the social series "Sukkar Wasat" in 2013, as well as in the series "Waiting for Jasmine", which depicted painful Syrian reality in 2015.

Her theatrical work is small, but she participated in the socio-political play "Weird" and the comedic social play "Kasak Ya Watan". The two plays were written by writer Mohamed Al Maghout and accompanied by Duraid Lahham.

== Personal life ==
Sabah Jazairi married the Lebanese Rabah al-Taqi, and the couple had three children, Rasha, Taraf and Karam. Her daughter Rasha entered the artistic field and worked in acting for several years. She is married to Amer Majzoub and has two children.
