= Ghada El-Shamaa =

Syrian actress (born 1961)

- غادة الشمعة
- Born: December 31, 1961; Damascus, Second Syrian Republic
- Occupation: Actress
- Years active: 1979–2011

Ghada El-Shamaa (Arabic: غادة الشمعة; born December 31, 1961) is a Syrian actress who commenced her career in the late 1970s, she has actively pursued roles in both Syrian and Egyptian productions.

== Early life ==
Hailing from the city of Damascus, El-Shamaa was born into a Sunni family.

== Career ==
Her career started in 1979 with a role in the television series "What's Wrong," she experienced a significant turning point when Duraid Lahham started selecting her for his series. Following her rise to fame in Syria, she caught the eye of Egyptian director Hossam El Din Mostafa, marking her entry into the Egyptian film industry. She successfully secured roles in several Egyptian films, including noteworthy performances in "The Rowdies and the Coach" and "Clash of Beauties."

== Personal life ==
She is a dual citizen, holding both Syrian and Egyptian nationalities.

== Filmography ==
- What's Wrong (1979)
- Fake Love (1980)
- Scheherazade's Beautiful Nights (1982)
- Reluctant Girls (1982)
- Tragedy of a Middle Eastern Girl (1983)
- The Game of Love and Murder (1983)
- Love's Revenge (1983)
- Summer Rain (1984)
- The Sun on a Cloudy Day (1985)
- Eastern Girl (1986)
- Scheherazade's Nights (1987)
- The Path of Remorse (1987)
- The Three Troublemakers (1987)
- The Officer and the Criminal (1987)
- The Doctor (1988)
- The Female Taxi Driver (1989)
- Bitter Words (1990)
- The Rowdies and the Captain (1991)
- Maroof the Shoemaker (1992)
- A Friend (1992)
- The Job Is Still in My Pocket (1992)
- In Wonderland (1993)
- The Devil's Path (1993)
- Clash of Beauties (1993)
- The Beauty and the Genie (1993)
- What the Heart Wants (1996)
- The Turtles (1996)
- Daoud in Hollywood (1998)
- The Poor Girl Gets Married (2000)
- Bomb Action (2011)
