= Mahmoud Gabr =

Syrian actor (1935–2008)

- Born: December 14, 1935; Shahba, Syria
- Died: July 27, 2008 (aged 72); Syria
- Occupation: Actor
- Years active: 1960-1999

Mahmoud Gabr (Arabic: محمود جبر, 14 December 1935 - 27 July 2008) is a Syrian actor.

== Early life ==
Gabr was born in Shahba, As-Suwayda Governorate, to a Druze family.

== Career ==
In his early youth, Gabr began his journey in theater while studying at a school in Al-Midan, Damascus. He co-founded an amateur theater group in the early 1950s with his schoolmates. To focus more on theater, he transferred to a private school offering evening classes. In 1955, he premiered his first comedy play, "Nasi Effendi." Gabr later worked in the Free Theater managed by Abdel Latif Fathy and contributed to establishing the Military Theater, where he performed in the opening production, "The Green Perfume," alongside Muna Wassef.

In 1968, Gabr established his own theater group. He then transitioned to teaching at the School of Science and Arts before joining the Syrian Ministry of Culture as a theater expert. Mahmoud Gabr served as Deputy Head of the Artists Syndicate for six years from 1984 to 1990. He also successfully ran for the People's Assembly in the sessions of 1986–1990 and 1990–1994.

== Personal life ==
Gabr married Haifa Wassef, the sister of Muna Wassef, and they had four children. Two of their daughters, Marah and Laila, became actresses. Additionally, his granddaughter Dana is also a well-known actress. His brothers, Naji Jaber, known as "Abu Antar", and Haitham Jabr, known as "Abu Al-Hakam".

Gabr died in 2008, after being afflicted with angina.

== Filmography ==
- Happy Vacation (1960)
- Tailor for Women (1969)
- Cats of Hamra Street (1971)
- Bridge of the Wicked (1971)
- Love Prank (1972)
- Distressed Youth (1972)
- This is what Happened with us (1973)
- Girls of Modern Times (1973)
- Troublemaker (1974)
- Women for the Winter (1974)
- Dancer on Wounds (1974)
- The Five Swindlers (1974)
- The Loving Gypsy (1974)
- No Time for Deception (1975)
- Challenge Wedding (1975)
- Beauty and the Four Eyes (1975)
- The Belle & the Space Conqueror (1975)
- Hunting Men (1976)
- Everybody Loves (1976)
- The Postman (1977)
- Dreams in the Air (1992)
- Houbara Dance (1999)
