= Adib Qaddoura =

Syrian actor

- Born: July 1, 1948; Ma'alot-Tarshiha, Israel
- Occupation: Actor
- Years active: 1960-2006

Adib Qaddoura (Arabic: أديب قدورة) is a Syrian actor who achieved the status of a sex symbol in Syria, often mentioned alongside Ighraa. One of his most notable roles was in "The Cheetah". He also made notable appearances in Italian cinema.

== Early life ==
Born in Palestine to a family with both Syrian and Palestinian heritage.

== Acting career ==
Initially focusing on figurative art, he ventured into the realms of décor and later transitioned into the field of theatre. His breakthrough came in 1972 when he was discovered and introduced by the director Nabil Maleh. A prolific career in the theatre followed, with notable contributions to plays such as "The Days We Forget," "The Angel Landed in Babylon," and "The Tragedy of Guevara." His extensive resume includes over 60 television series, 37 films, and notable appearances in Italian cinema. In Italy, director Tueni organized a symposium where critics, directors, and artists from academic institutes analyzed Adib Qaddoura's facial expressions in three-dimensional shots. This unique ability led to his involvement in Italian films. During an international film festival, a Swiss film critic inquired about the writer, and playwright Mahmoud Diab praised Qaddoura, likening him to the Anthony Quinn of Syria.

== Personal life ==
He got married and has seven children.

== Filmography ==
- Blazing Nights (1960)
- Torment Journey (1972)
- A Woman of Fire (1971)
- The Cheetah (1972)
- The World in 2000 (1972)
- Another Face of Love (1973)
- Remains of Pictures (1973)
- One Man Wanted (1973)
- Liberation Knights (1974)
- Jewels James Bond (1974)
- Girls for Love (1974)
- The Loving Gypsy (1974)
- The Shame (1974)
- No Time for Deception (1975)
- Beauty and the Four Eyes (1975)
- The Belle & the Space Conqueror (1975)
- Night of Men (1976)
- Forbidden Love (1976)
- Lovers on the Road (1977)
- Love and Winter (1977)
- Earth Wedding (1978)
- Shajar Al-Durr (1979)
- Fake Love (1980)
- Khalil's father (1980)
- Ezz Al Din Al Qassam (1981)
- Tragedy of a Middle Eastern Girl (1983)
- Love's Revenge (1983)
- Harvest Years (1985)
- Eastern Girl (1986)
- Sisban Wolfs (1987)
- A Woman Who Doesn't Know Despair (1987)
- The Orphan (1988)
- Lost in Disappointed Eyes (1989)
- Valley of the Deers (1990)
- Sand Maiden (1990)
- Arab Biography (1992)
- The Outsider (1992)
- Dulama's Father's Anecdotes (1993)
- Tears of Asayel (1994)
- Gun Smoke (1994)
- Oleander Mornings (1995)
- The Snake (1995)
- We Were Friends (1996)
- Hill of Ash (1997)
- Under the Blue Sky (1997)
- Yaqut (1998)
- Mot'eb (1998)
- Travel (1998)
- Mazar District (1999)
- Night Horse (1999)
- Winter Flowers (1999)
- Mystery Tales (2000)
- The Charm of the East (2001)
- Omar El Khayyam (2002)
- Edge of the Abyss (2002)
- Playing with the Bad Guys (2002)
- Midnight Nightmares (2003)
- The Finish Line (2003)
- Story of a Mother (2003)
- Mother Of Hashem (2003)
- The Candle and the Pin (2003)
- My God (2005)
- Return My Morning (2006)

== Awards ==
In 1976, he was nominated for Best Actor by the Syrian newspaper Al-Thawra through a public referendum. In 1979, a similar nomination for Best Arab Actor came from the Jordanian newspaper Al-Dustour. His international recognition continued in 1980 when he received a nomination for Best Actor from Asia and Africa at the Carthage Film Festival.
