= Hala Shawkat =

Syrian actress (1930–2007)

- Born: Fatma Turkan Shawkat; March 18, 1930; Daraa, Syria
- Died: April 28, 2007 (aged 77); Damascus, Syria
- Occupation: Actress
- Known for: Memory of a Night of Love

Fatma Turkan Shawkat (Arabic: فاطمة توركان شوكت; 1930–2007), better known by her stage name Hala Shawkat (هالة شوكت), was a Syrian actress. She was one of the leading actresses of Syrian cinema in the mid-1950s and 1960s. Shawkat also appeared in films in Algeria, Egypt, and Lebanon.

== Life and career ==
Shawkat was born in Daraa, Syria, to a family of Turkish origin. She gained her first film role in Egypt where she acted alongside Omar Sharif and Samia Gamal in the 1959 film Mao'ed Maa' Al Majhoul ("Date With The Unknown"). Shawkat also starred alongside other renowned Egyptian actors such as Salah Zulfikar, Mahmoud Yacine and Nadia Lutfi, such as her role with Salah Zulfikar in the 1973 film Zekra Lailat Hubb ("Memory of a Night of Love"). Upon returning to Syrian, she worked with a number of Syrian directors and participated in several plays, including the famous play Cheers Nation alongside Duraid Lahham. In her later career she starred in numerous soap operas and radio programs.

Shawkat died at the age of 77.
