= Sah Al-Noom =

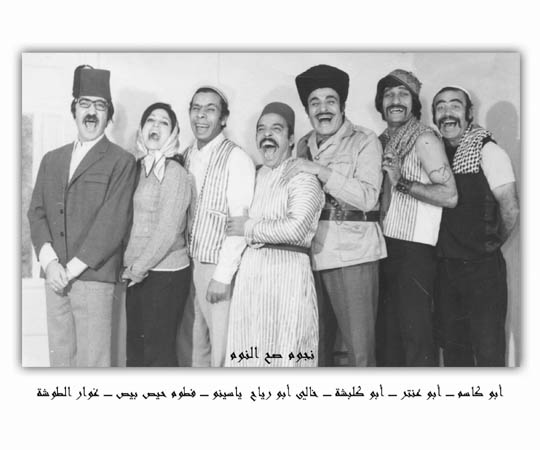
- Season 2 cast
- صح النوم
- Genre: Comedy
- Written by: Nehad Kaleai
- Country of origin: Syria
- Original language: Arabic

Original release
- Release: 1972

Sah Al-Noom (Arabic: صح النوم) is a 1972 Syrian television series. It was written by Nehad Kaleai. In 2023, Jamil Lahham, a Syrian-American animator and filmmaker, paid tribute to the show by recreating it using a computer software, Quill.

== Cast ==
- Duraid Lahham as Ghawwar
- Nehad Kaleai as Hosny Al-Borazan
- Naji Jaber as Abu Antar
- Najah Hafeez as Fatoom
- Abdel-Latif Fat'hy as Chief of Police Abu Kalabsha
- Yassin Bakosh as Yassin

== See also ==
- List of Syrian television series
