= The Return of Life =

- عودة الحياة
- Directed by: Zoheir Bakir
- Written by: Zoheir Bakir; Adly Nour (screenplay and dialogue)
- Produced by: Edward Khayat
- Starring: Ahmed Ramzy; Maha Sabry; Mahmoud el-Meliguy; Zeinat Sedki; Youssef Fakhr Eddine; Samiha Ayoub; Ighraa; Khalil Badr El Dein
- Cinematography: Mostafa Hassan
- Edited by: Abdelmoneim Tawfik
- Music by: Abdelazim Mohammed; Raouf Zohny; Hussein Junaid
- Production company: Omayya Films
- Distributed by: New World Films
- Release date: August 24, 1959
- Running time: 110 minutes
- Country: Egypt
- Language: Arabic

The Return of Life (Arabic: عودة الحياة, transliterated as Awdat el hayat) is an Egyptian film released on August 24, 1959. The film is directed and written by Zoheir Bakir, features a screenplay co-written by Adly Nour, and stars Ahmed Ramzy, Maha Sabry, and Mahmoud el-Meliguy. The plot involves a family who lives in peace until the wife asks her husband for help with her glaucoma, leading him to seek drugs and turn the family’s life upside down.

== Cast ==
- Ahmed Ramzy (Ahmed Abdelaziz, a lawyer)
- Maha Sabry (Semsema, Hussein’s daughter)
- Youssef Fakhr Eddine (Amin, Semsema’s brother/Zarif)
- Mahmoud el-Meliguy (Hussein Abdelfattah)
- Zeinat Sedki (Ehsan Daqdaq, a scientist)
- Samiha Ayoub (Tahia, Hussein’s wife)
- Mohamed Reda (Darwish, Tahia’s uncle from Brazil)
- Abdel Ghani Kamar (Sgt. Mustafa)
- Mohamed El Deeb (Rashid, a lawyer)
- Badr Nofal (doctor)
- Khalil Badr El Dein (Ezzat)
- Wafaa Sharif (Fatima)
- Kawther Ramzi (Ensaf)
- Ighraa (Zainab)
- Farhat Omar (Shadid)
- Laila Hamdy
- Mohamed Youssef
- Abdulhamid Badawi
- Ahmed Bali
- Samia Mohsen
- Ezzat Abduljawad
- Fouad Rateb
- Hussein Abdel Ghani
- Mutawa Owais
- Ismail Kamel
- Fayza Abdo
- Wafaa Helmy
- Salwa Rushdi
- Abdelhalim al-Nahal
- Zaki Azab
- Mahmoud Ashmawi
- Ahmed Abdelfattah
- Mahmoud Abdel Aziz
- Othman el-Miniawy (singing)

== Songs ==
Songs in score
Title	Lyricist	Composer	Singer
“أبو دم خفيف” (“Light Blooded”)	Mohamed Halawa	Hussein Junaid	Maha Sabry
“أيوه ده هو ده” (“Yes, This Is It”)	Mohamed Aly Ahmed	Raouf Zohny	Maha Sabry
“أحلى أماني الفرح” (“Best Wishes for Joy”)	Muhammad al-Bahti	Abdelazim Mohammed	Maha Sabry

== Synopsis ==
Hussein Abdelfattah (Mahmoud el-Meliguy), a simple worker, lives contentedly with his wife, Tahia (Samiha Ayoub), and his two children, Amin and Semsema. Tahia chafes at their life of poverty and demands that her husband bring them above it. Hussein encounters his former co-workers Ezzat (Khalil Badr El Dein), who lives in a large house but funds it through drug dealing. Police arrest Hussein and lose one of their own during the ensuing firefight, earning him a sentence of life in prison and the confiscation of his money.

Tahia moves into a small loft on Muhammad Ali Street in Cairo’s Old City with the help of her friend, a scientist named Ehsan Daqdaq (Zeinat Sedki). Her son Amin falls ill and is hospitalized, leading Tahia to suffer a nervous breakdown and be committed to a mental hospital, whence Ehsan adopts Semsema. Amin recovers and goes with Sgt. Mustafa (Abdul Ghani Kamar) to Ehsan’s house, where she refuses to see him. Ehsan runs a wedding belly dance troupe in which her daughter Zainab (Ighraa) works with two young entertainers, composer Zarif (Youssef Fakhr Eddine) and Semsema (Maha Sabry).

Darwish (Mohamed Reda), Tahia’s uncle, returns from Brazil an enriched man to find her and her children. He enlists a lawyer named Rashid (Mohamed El Deeb) to help find them after depositing 100,000 Egyptian pounds in the bank to care for them. Rashid assigns his paralegal, Ahmed Abdelaziz (Ahmed Ramzy) to handle the search. Ahmed discovers Tahia in the hospital with amnesia. Ahmed rents her a house and contacts Ehsan, who denies knowing Semsema’s whereabouts for fear of losing her as the band’s star singer.

Tahia falls madly in love with Ahmed and accuses Semsema of stealing him from her. Hussein gets out of prison and searches for Tahia, revealing to them that Amin and Zarif are one and the same. He threatens Ehsan into confesses that Semsema is in fact Tahia’s daughter. Tahia is injured in accident that restores her memory. Ahmed marries Semsema, and the family is reunited at last.
