= Nadine Khoury =

Syrian actress

Nadia Lutfi Al-Khoury
- Born: May 26, 1959; Damascus, Syria
- Other names: The Virgin of the Screen
- Occupation: Actress
- Years active: 1977–present

Nadine Khoury (Arabic: نادين الخوري) is a Syrian actress who started her career in the late 70s and became famous as "The Virgin of the Screen".

== Early life ==
Khoury was born in Damascus to a Christian family originally from Homs.

== Career ==
Khoury's interest for acting began in 1977. She had various nicknames: Nadine was referred to by several names like "Nadia Nasri," "Nadia Homsi," and "Nadine," but she eventually chose "Nadine Khoury" as her final nickname. Her debut film was "The Beautiful Journalist" in 1977, featuring the Syrian actress Ighraa.

Khoury received the Damascus International Film Festival Award in 2007 and the State Appreciation Award from the Syrian Ministry of Culture in 2023, recognizing her contributions to the arts.

== Personal life ==
She is the sister of Syrian cinematographer George Lutfi Al-Khoury. She remained unmarried and has no children.

== Filmography ==
- The Beautiful Journalist (1977)
- Fish Without Bones (1978)
- A Marriage on the Local Way (1978)
- Home Sweet Home (1979)
- Hunters' Lane (1979)
- The Fifth Castle (1979)
- Salt Alley (1980)
- Fingerprints on the Wall of Time (1980)
- Narrow Paths (1980)
- Drums of Freedom (1981)
- Killing by Sequencing (1982)
- The Will (1982)
- Maraya (1984)
- The Conquerors (1984)
- Wings (1984)
- Ouased's Return (1985)
- Goodbye... Age of Silence (1986)
- Hala (1986)
- Arar and Amir (1987)
- Sisban Wolfs (1987)
- The Orphan (1988)
- For You, Levant (1989)
- Hidden Threads (1990)
- Building 22 (1990)
- See People (1991)
- Bottom Line (1992)
- Once Upon a Time S1 (1992)
- Mountains of Fire (1992)
- The Old Hut (1992)
- Arab Biography (1992)
- Deviation (1992)
- Arab icons (1992)
- Misery of a Woman (1993)
- Different Fortunes in Life (1994)
- The Brilliant (1994)
- The Diaries of a General Manager S1 (1995)
- Love and Hate (1995)
- Time with sunset (1996)
- The Last Moment (1996)
- Shadows from the Past (1997)
- Thorny Road (1997)
- Listen and Obey (1997)
- The Quishani Bathroom S2 (1997)
- The Sawwan Hill (1997)
- Hill of Ash (1997)
- The Brothers S2 (1997)
- Laugh and Cry (1997)
- Trials (1998)
- Very Kind (1998)
- Cry of a Long Night (1998)
- Residents of Earth Are Visitors (1998)
- The Quishani Bathroom S3 (1998)
- Bitter Wishes (1998)
- Little Women (1999)
- Fire Spear (1999)
- A Hero from This Time (1999)
- Where's the Way (1999)
- The Unknown (1999)
- The Laughing Club (2000)
- Khokh and Roman (2000)
- Congratulations (2001)
- General Damascus (2001)
- The Quishani Bathroom S4 (2001)
- Desert Shrines (2001)
- Saladin (2001)
- Searching for Salah Ad-Din (2001)
- A Rose for the Autumn Years (2002)
- The Struggle of Time (2002)
- Abo Altaieb Almotanaby (2002)
- Jasmine's Claws (2003)
- Before Sunset (2003)
- Saif Ibn Ze Yazan (2003)
- The Quishani Bathroom S5 (2003)
- Our Good Days (2003)
- The Midwife (2003)
- Marzouk on All Fronts (2004)
- Killing of Spring (2004)
- Men Underneath the Fez (2004)
- Autumn Tale (2004)
- People of the city (2004)
- Goat Horn (2005)
- Men and Women (2005)
- Silence Barrier (2005)
- The Almoravids and Andalusia (2005)
- The Sun Rises Again (2005)
- The Dew of Days (2006)
- Deer in the Forest of Wolves (2006)
- The Hasheem (2006)
- Case 6008 (2006)
- Money Masters (2006)
- Hidden Grudges (2006)
- Love Story (2007)
- The World's Highest Plateau (2007)
- The Time of Fear (2007)
- Age Madness (2007)
- Embers and Pebbles (2007)
- Face of Justice (2008)
- Rendezvous with the Rain (2008)
- Damascus Talks (2008)
- Breaking News (2008)
- Those Who Fall in Love S2 (2008)
- The Red Line (2008)
- Lean Days of the Levant S2 (2008)
- Alive (2009)
- The Bees Road (2009)
- Money Conflict (2009)
- The Traveling of Stones (2009)
- Summer Cloud (2009)
- Decisive Men (2009)
- Unknown Woman (2009)
- Lean Days of the Levant S3 (2009)
- Behind the Sun (2009)
- What You Rightfully Possess (2010)
- Zero Hour (2010)
- Al-Dabour (2010)
- Talea Al Feda (2011)
- Men of Honor (2011)
- Forgiveness (2011)
- A Taboo Passion (2011)
- Al-Dabour S2 (2011)
- Mariam (2012)
- Naked Souls (2012)
- The Confused (2013)
- A Very Hard Birth S3: Platform of the Dead
- Faces Behind the Faces (2014)
- The Collar of Girls (2014)
- Door of the Intended (2014)
- All the Love (2014)
- In Mysterious Circumstances (2015)
- The Collar of Girls S2: Women Cunning (2015)
- Donia S2 (2015)
- Awaiting the Jasmine (2015)
- The Sieve S2: Divide and Conquer (2015)
- School of Love (2016)
- The Levant's Fragrance S1 (2016)
- The Fog Crossers (2016)
- Demise (2016)
- Without Sheath (2016)
- Red (2016)
- Levantine Rose (2017)
- Solitaire (2017)
- The Levant's Fragrance S2 (2017)
- Solitary (2018)
- For My Heart to Flourish (2018)
- The Levant's Fragrance S3 (2018)
- Amina (2018)
- Love Melodies (2019)
- Love Me Not (2019)
- The Levant's Fragrance S4 (2019)
- The Harem (2019)
- Love Me Not S2 (2020)
- Chicago Street (2020)
- Damask S1 (2020)
- The Harem S2 (2020)
- Love Is Madness S3 (2020)
- Because It's My Country (2021)
- The Qubba Alley S1 (2021)
- Suspended (2022)
- Breaking Bones (2022)
- Enamoured (2022)
- Dafa (2022)
- The Qubba Alley S2 (2022)
- Damask S2 (2022)
- Dreams Drawn by Dust (2022)
- Born Into Wealth (2023)
- Knights of Darkness: Night Wolves (2023)
- Eco (2023)
- The Coachman (2023)
- The Board (2024)
