= Al-Mughamara =

1974 film

Al-Mughamara (The Adventure) المغامرة
- Directed by: Muhammad Shahin
- Written by: Muhammad Shahin; Qais Al-Zubaidi
- Starring: Muna Wassef; Ighraa; Usama Rumani; Ahmad Addas
- Cinematography: Hassan Ezziddine
- Edited by: Adnan Salloum
- Music by: Suheil Arafa
- Release date: 1974
- Running time: 100 minutes
- Country: Syria
- Language: Arabic

Al-Mughamara (Arabic: المغامرة) (The Adventure) is a Syrian film which was released in 1974. It was directed by the Syrian film Director Muhammad Shahin. The movie is 100 minutes long.

== Plot ==
This film depends on history trying to give some contemporary interpretations by telling about the struggle over power between the Vizier and the Caliphate. The Vizier is trying to seek help from foreign armies to help him usurp power. One guard takes the chance and delivers his head to the Vizier so as to write a message of help to the enemies. The guard starts his adventure dreaming of wealth and beautiful slave girls. But he discovers too late that the Vizier had asked the enemy to cut the head of the message carrier. So the adventure ends with death.

== Cast and crew ==
=== Cast ===
- Muna Wassef
- Ahmad Addas
- Ighraa
- Oussama Al-Roumani

=== Crew ===
- Mohammad Shahine Director
- Hassan Ezziddine Director of Photography
- Adnan Salloum Editor
- Kays Al-Zoubeidi Editor
- Suheil Arafa Soundtrack (Original Score)
