= Al-Shams Fi Yawam Gha'em =

1986 film directed by Muhammad Shahin

Al-Shams Fi Yawm Gha'em (The Sun on a Cloudy Day) الشمس في يوم غائم
- Directed by: Muhammad Shahin
- Written by: Script: Muhammad Shahin; Mohamed Mouri Farouge
- Starring: Muna Wassef; Rafik El Soubeil; Jihad Saad; Jada El Charnaa
- Cinematography: George Houry
- Edited by: Haithan Kouatilli
- Music by: Solhi Al-Wadi
- Release date: 1986
- Running time: 90 minutes
- Country: Syria
- Language: Arabic

Al-Shams Fi Yawm Gha'em (Arabic: الشمس في يوم غائم, romanized: The Sun on a Cloudy Day) is a 1986 Syrian language film release directed by the Syrian film Director Muhammad Shahin of 90 minutes duration.

== Plot ==
This film is set in 1930s Syria's pre-independence days. Adil (Jihad Sahd) was born into wealth yet empathizes with the poor, renounces his family and joins the "lower orders." He is given a crash course in Syrian customs by the Old Man (Rafik El Soubeil). Adil is awakened sexually by the ingratiating prostitute (Muna Wassef). Adil's father finds his son, is envious of the Old Man's relationship with the boy and he exacts a terrible revenge on the old man by using his money and social position as protection from legal consequences.

== Cast ==
- Muna Wassef - the "Prostitute"
- Rafik El Soubeil - Old Man
- Jihad Sahd - Adil
- Jada El Charnaa - Nour
