= Ahmad Melli =

Syrian actor (1949–2026)

Ahmad Melli (also spelt Ahmad Milly; Arabic: أحمد مللي; 1949 – 11 January 2026) was a Syrian actor. He appeared on the television series Zaman Al Barghout, as well as in films like Al-Hodoud, on the radio and in theatres. Melli died on 11 January 2026.
