= 2010 Damascus International Film Festival =

- Festival Poster
- Location: Damascus, Syria
- Festival date: November 7–13, 2010
- Website: http://www.damascusfest.com/en/

The 2010 Damascus International Film Festival is the 18th incarnation of the international film festival held in Damascus, Syria which ran from November 7 to 13, 2010. Prizes were awarded in three categories and a 222 films were shown in 18 categories during the course of the festival.

This edition of the Damascus International Film Festival, organised under the patronage of Syrian Minister of Culture Dr. Riad Ismat, opened with a ceremony at the Damascus Opera House, at which Turkish actress Türkan Şoray and Syrian actor Ghassan Massoud were among the guests of honor, and a screening of Honey (Turkish: Bal) directed by Semih Kaplanoğlu. The opening ceremony featured a respect parade for the nine Turkish people who lost their lives during the Gaza flotilla raid on May 31, 2010.

The festival close with a screening of Uncle Boonmee Who Can Recall His Past Lives (Thai: ลุงบุญมีระลึกชาติ, RTGS: Lung Bunmi Raluek Chat) directed by Apichatpong Weerasethakul.

== Programs ==
=== Official Feature Competition ===
- About Her Brother (Japanese: Otōto) directed by Yoji Yamada
- Cell 211 (Spanish: Celda 211) directed by Daniel Monzón
- Confucius (Chinese: 孔子; pinyin: Kǒng Zǐ) directed by Hu Mei
- Foxes directed by Mira Fornay
- Guards of Silence directed by Samir Zekra
- How I Ended This Summer (Russian: Как я провёл этим летом, translit. Kak ya provyol etim letom) directed by Alexei Popogrebski
- If I Want to Whistle, I Whistle (Romanian: Eu când vreau să fluier, fluier) directed by Florin Şerban
- Cosmos (Turkish: Kosmos) directed by Reha Erdem
- Our Life (Italian: La Nostra Vita) directed by Daniele Luchetti
- The Princess of Montpensier (French: La Princesse de Montpensier) directed by Bertrand Tavernier
- September Rain directed by Abdellatif Abdelhamid
- My Joy (Russian: Счастье моё, translit. Schastye moyo; Ukrainian: Щастя моє, translit. Shchastya moye) directed by Sergei Loznitsa
- Never Let Me Go directed by Mark Romanek
- On The Path (Bosnian: Na putu) directed by Jasmila Žbanić
- Outside the Law (French: Hors-la-loi) directed by Rachid Bouchareb
- Please Do Not Disturb directed by Mohsen Abdolvahab
- Submarino directed by Thomas Vinterberg
- Sun Dress directed by Saeed Salmeen Al-Murry
- The Chord directed by Magdy El-Hawary
- The Hairdresser (German: Die Friseuse) directed by Doris Dörrie
- Venezzia directed by Haik Gazarian
- Late December (French: Fin Décembre) directed by Moez Kammoun
- The Mosque (French: La Mosquée) directed by Daoud Aoulad-Syad
- Clockwise directed by Khalifa al-Muraikhi

=== Official Program ===
- A Woman, a Gun and a Noodle Shop (simplified Chinese: 三枪拍案惊奇; traditional Chinese: 三槍拍案驚奇; pinyin: Sānqiāng Pāi'àn Jīngqí) directed by Zhang Yimou
- Another Year directed by Mike Leigh
- Biutiful directed by Alejandro González Iñárritu
- Chantrapas directed by Otar Iosseliani
- Departures (Japanese: おくりびと, romanized: Okuribito) directed by Yōjirō Takita
- The Secret in Their Eyes (Spanish: El Secreto de Sus Ojos) directed by Juan José Campanella
- Gran Torino directed by Clint Eastwood
- Honey (Turkish: Bal) directed by Semih Kaplanoğlu
- Poetry (Korean: 시, translit. Shi) directed by Lee Chang-dong
- Film Socialisme directed by Jean-Luc Godard
- Somewhere directed by Sofia Coppola
- Soul Kitchen directed by Fatih Akın
- The Ghost Writer directed by Roman Polanski
- The White Ribbon (German: Das weiße Band, Eine deutsche Kindergeschichte) directed by Michael Haneke
- On Tour (French: Tournee) directed by Mathieu Amalric
- Uncle Boonmee Who Can Recall His Past Lives (Thai: ลุงบุญมีระลึกชาติ, RTGS: Lung Bunmi Raluek Chat) directed by Apichatpong Weerasethakul
- A Prophet (French: Un Prophète) directed by Jacques Audiard
- Up directed by Pete Docter
- Burnt by the Sun 2: Prestanding (Russian: Утомлённые солнцем 2: Предстояние, translit. Utomlyonnye solntsem 2: Predstoyanie) directed by Pete Docter
- Taming (French: Rodage) directed by Nidal Aldibs

=== Turkish Cinema ===
- A Fairground Attraction (Turkish: Hazan Mevsimi - Bir Panayir Hikayesi) directed by Mehmet Eryılmaz
- Waiting for Heaven (Turkish: Cenneti Beklerken) directed by Derviş Zaim
- Climates (Turkish: İklimler) directed by Nuri Bilge Ceylan
- My Father and My Son (Turkish: Babam ve Oğlum) directed by Çağan Irmak
- Three Monkeys (Turkish: Üç Maymun) directed by Nuri Bilge Ceylan
- Umut directed by Yılmaz Güney
- Distant (Turkish: Uzak) directed by Nuri Bilge Ceylan
- Egg (Turkish: Yumurta) directed by Semih Kaplanoğlu

== See also ==
- 2010 in film
