= Rasha Al Taqi =

Lebanese actress (born 1985)

Racha Taki
- Born: Racha Rabah Al Taki; 18 October 1985 (age 40); Beirut, Lebanon
- Occupation: Actress
- Years active: 2004–2009
- Spouse: Amer Al Majzoub (m. 2009)
- Children: 2

Racha Taki (Arabic: رشا التقي; born 18 October 1985) is a Lebanese actress. She is from an artistic family where her mother is the Syrian actress Sabah Al Jazairi and her aunt is the comedian Samia Al Jazairi.
