= Damascus International Film Festival =

Biennial film festival in Syria

Coordinates: 33°30′47″N 36°18′34″E

Damascus International Film Festival مهرجان دمشق السينمائي الدولي
- Location: Damascus, Syria
- Founded: 1979 (47 years ago)
- Festival date: November (biennial)
- Website: damascusfest.com

The Damascus International Film Festival (Arabic: مهرجان دمشق السينمائي الدولي) is a biennial November film festival hosted by the government of Syria since 1979.

The festival was established by the late Syrian film director Muhammad Shahin. It alternates with the Carthage Film Festival. Up to 1999, the festival's competition focused on films from Arab countries, Latin America and Asia. Since 2001 the festival has an international focus.

== Award winners ==
Year	Best film	Best actor	Best actress
1979; 1st	Sun of the Hyenas; Fences		
1981; 2nd	The Survivors; Fragments		
1983; 3rd	Last of Presents		
1985; 4th	Remedy	Syed Ali Koirat for Kingdom of Dreams	Naglaa Fathi for Sorry, Law
1987; 5th	A Successful Man	Ahmed Zaki for The Wife of an Important Man	Pan Hong for The Last Empress; Mahua Roychoudhury for Man and Woman
1989; 6th	Nights of the Jackal	Asaad Fedda for Nights of the Jackal	Fatima Belhadj for The Citadel
1991; 7th	Supporting Roles; The Kit Kat	Mahmoud Abdel Aziz for The Kit Kat	Luisa Pérez Nieto for Supporting Roles
1993; 8th	The Frontier	Abdellatif Kechiche for Bezness	Dimple Kapadia for The Mourner
1995; 9th	Amnesia	Tayser Idris for Rising Rain; Mohamed Ali Allalou for Youssef: The Legend of the Seventh Sleeper	Amel Hédhili for The Silences of the Palace; Lucy for The Stolen Joy
1997; 10th	Tieta of Agreste; The Captain		Tao Hong for Colors of the Blind
1999; 11th	Fallen Angels Paradise		Tamara Acosta for The Revenge
2001; 12th	Aberdeen	Josse De Pauw for Everybody's Famous!	Licia Maglietta for Bread and Tulips
2003; 13th	Dolls		
2005; 14th	(Argentina) Little Sky		
2007; 15th	That Winter	Julio Chávez for The Other	All actresses for Caramel
2008; 16th	Empties	Reza Naji for The Song of Sparrows	Kristin Scott Thomas for I've Loved You So Long
2009; 17th	Treeless Mountain	Vladimir Ilyin & Aleksey Vertkov for Ward No. 6	Giovanna Mezzogiorno for Victory
2010; 18th	Outside the Law	George Piştereanu for If I Want to Whistle, I Whistle	Gabriela Maria Schmeide for The Hairdresser
