= Nabila El-Nabulsi =

- Born: January 1, 1949; Syria
- Died: June 29, 2010 (aged 61); Syria
- Occupation: Actress
- Years active: 1970–2008

Nabila El-Nabulsi (Arabic: نبيلة النابلسي) was a prominent Syrian actress who gained recognition during the 1970s, and attained iconic status in the Syrian film industry due to her captivating beauty. She is particularly renowned for her memorable portrayal in the acclaimed film Men Under the Sun (1970).

== Early life ==
Born into a Syrian family with Palestinian roots.

== Personal life ==
She faced tough times early in life after losing her father at a young age.

== Death ==
On June 29, 2010, she died following a battle with illness.

== Acting career ==
At the age of thirteen, she started working as a typist and later pursued a career as a nurse for two years. Subsequently, she transitioned into acting, initially appearing in commercial advertisements shown in cinemas before films starting in 1970. Notably, film director Nabil Maleh was impressed by her performance in these advertisments and cast her as a poor, pregnant farmer in the movie Men Under the Sun, alongside Youssef Hanna and Khaled Taja. After a hiatus in the mid-1970, she returned to work, this time in television, following the success of the film, which led to numerous offers.

== Filmography ==
- Men Under the Sun (1970)
- A Woman Who Lives Alone (1971)
- Distressed Youth (1972)
- Love Trip (1972)
- Another Face of Love (1973)
- My Blood, My Tears and My Smile (1973)
- Troublemaker (1974)
- Women for the Winter (1974)
- Jewels of James Bond (1974)
- Girls for Love (1974)
- Goodbye... Age of Silence (1986)
- Minor's Love (1986)
- Short Paths (1986)
- The Orphan (1988)
- The Fire (1988)
- For You, Levant (1989)
- The Reward (1989)
- When the Fog Clears (1990)
- Cave of Morocco (1991)
- The Twin (1991)
- Kamel's Father (1991)
- Face to Face (1992)
- Naji El Ali (1992)
- Fezzes (1992)
- The Bride (1992)
- The Homeless (1992)
- The Alternative (1992)
- That Flower (1993)
- The Help-Seeker (1993)
- Al-Quishani Bathroom S1 (1994)
- Father of Jassem's Children (1994)
- The Castle of Al-Fakhar (1995)
- The Last Moment (1996)
- Dreams of the Father of Hana (1996)
- Al-Quishani Bathroom S2 (1997)
- The Fugitive (1997)
- I'm No Longer a Child (1998)
- The Tuwaibi (1996)
- Soil Brothers S2 (1998)
- Four Seasons S1 (1999)
- Hearts in the Balance (2000)
- Congratulations (2001)
- Orchard of Death (2001)
- Me And My Children (2001)
- The Black Wall (2001)
- Action (2001)
- Dreams That Never Die (2001)
- A Mother To Be (2002)
- Four Seasons S2 (2002)
- The Insightful One (2002)
- Migrating Souls (2002)
- Law, However (2003)
- Modern Grooms (2003)
- Letters Written by the Rain (2003)
- House of Glory (2003)
- Spotlight S3 (2003)
- Woman in the Shadow (2003)
- Nights of Al-Salihiyah (2004)
- People of the City (2004)
- The Road (2004)
- The White Thread (2004)
- Stories and Secrets (2005)
- Spotlight S5 (2005)
- Mothers (2005)
- Beauties of Paradise (2005)
- The Dew of Days (2006)
- Basswood (2006)
- Hidden Grudges (2006)
- Another Dawn (2007)
- Love Story (2007)
- Messages of Love and War (2007)
- The Fugitive (2007)
- Another Rainy Day (2008)
- We're Married (2008)
- Not a Mirage (2008)
- Partners Sharing the Devastation (2008)
- Residents of Qaymariyya (2008)
