= Lina Bati =

Syrian actress (born 1948)

Lina Nassif Bati
- Born: 1 January 1948; Damascus, Syria
- Other names: "The Bride of Syrian Drama"
- Occupation: Actress
- Years active: 1967-2005

Lina Bati (Arabic: لينا باتع) is a Syrian actress, who began to soar to fame as the leading figure in Syrian drama during the 1970s, earning her the title of "The Bride of Syrian Drama."

== Early life ==
Bati was born to Nassif Bati, who worked in the grain trade and made good profits. She grew up in a Christian household.

== Acting career ==
She began her education at the University of Damascus, studying in the Faculty of Commerce, but left after two years due to her passion for acting. Her love for acting blossomed in middle school, where she showcased her talent in school plays and on the radio. In 1963, Lina joined the Dramatic Arts Troupe affiliated with the Ministry of Information after meeting Rafiq Al-Sabban. She became a member of the Syrian Actors Syndicate in 1968 and has been actively contributing to the acting field since 1961. Additionally, she ventured into the dubbing industry after moving to Kuwait in the mid-80s. Lina has also received recognition at various Arab festivals, including the Damascus International Film Festival and the Cairo International Film Festival.

== Personal life ==
She is married.

== Filmography ==
=== Films ===
- Happiness Bath (1968)
- The Mexican Hoax (1972)
- Love Prank (1972)
- My Hippy Wife (1973)
- One Man Wanted (1973)
- Special Romances (1974)
- My Beloved (1974)
- Love and Karate (1974)
- Between Reality and Fiction (1974)
- Women's Island (1976)
- The Head (1976)
- Lovers on the Road (1977)
- Our Life (1980)
- Lanterns (1982)
- The Migration of Hearts to Hearts (1991)
- Arab Biography (1982)
- Lazy (1993)
- Orchard Of Death (2001)
- Four Seasons S2 (2002)
- Holding Tears In (2005)
