= La Citadelle (film) =

- Arabic: El Kalaa
- Directed by: Mohamed Chouikh
- Written by: Mohamed Chouikh
- Produced by: Mohamed Tahar Harhoura
- Starring: Djilali Ain-Tedeles
- Cinematography: Allel Yahyaoui
- Release date: 1988
- Running time: 96 mins
- Country: Algeria
- Language: Arabic

La Citadelle (in Arabic El Kalaa) is a 1988 Algerian film written and directed by Mohamed Chouikh. A tragi-comedy set against the background of sexual inequality, it traces the amorous adventures of the young Kaddour, whose arranged marriage is intended as a lesson taught to him by his elders. Starring Djilali Ain-Tedeles, it won the prize for Best Cinematography (Allel Yahyaoui) at the 11th FESPACO held at Ouagadougou in 1989.

== Technical details ==
- Director - Mohamed Chouikh
- Writer - Mohamed Chouikh
- Producer - Mohamed Tahar Harhoura
- Director of Photography - Allel Yahyaoui
- Running Time - 96 mins
- Country - Algeria
- Language - Arabic
- Release Date - 1988

== Cast ==
- Djilali Ain-Tedeles
- Khaled Barkat
- Fatima Belhadj
- Momo
