= Nourhane =

Arabic singer and actress (1922–2022)

Nourhane نورهان
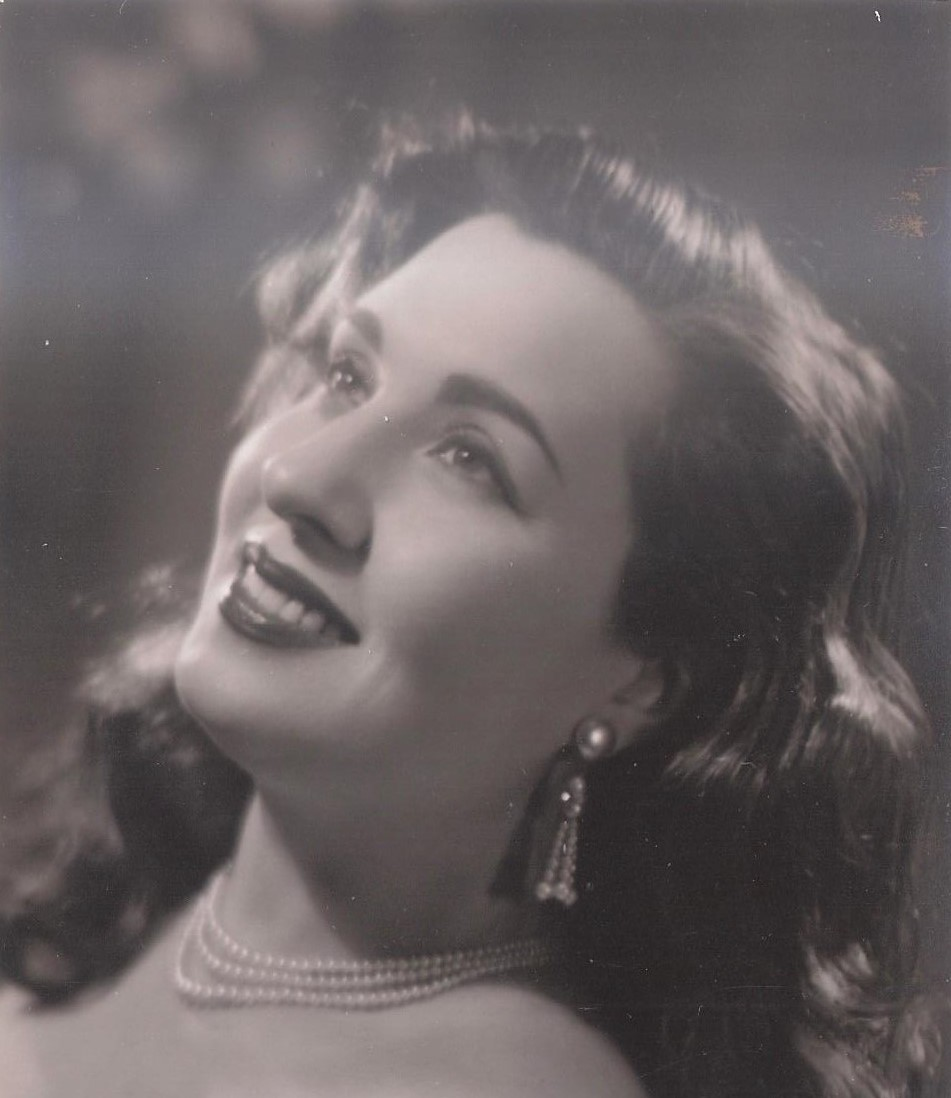

Background information
- Born: Kheirieh Jarkas; 1922; Damascus, Syria
- Died: February 28, 2022 (aged 100) Beirut, Lebanon
- Occupations: Singer; Actress

Kheirieh Jarkas (Arabic: خيريه جركس, 1922–2022), known mononymously as Nourhane (Arabic: نورهان), was a Syrian singer.

== Early life ==
Jarkas was born in Damascus (registered in the civil registries of Quneitra in the Golan Heights) in 1922 to parents of Circassian origin, Ali and Maryam.

She started singing at a young age, memorizing songs she heard on the radio and record-players, and reciting them at all-women traditional musical gatherings (istiqbal) that her mother and her friends would organize.

An orphan at the age of 7, she was sent to boarding school, and married at the age of 14 to a Lebanese man, a teacher, linguist, and translator, Kassem Kassem, who mastered 11 languages and who had settled in Aleppo to teach. Nourhane encouraged him to further his career by applying for a scholarship to study English literature in Cairo which he received. Together with their son, they moved to Cairo.

== Career ==
For economic reasons, and due to the shortcomings of Kassem's stipend, Nourhane started working as an extra on movies (notably Honey Moon (1945) starring Farid al-Atrash where she can be seen sitting at a table, listening to the legendary singer and actor).

Her professional name, Nourhane, was made up of the first part of the name of Lebanese singer Nour El Hoda and the last part of the name of Syrian singer and princess Asmahan. She acted in three feature films: Good and Evil (1946), Son of the Orient (1946), and Leila in Iraq (1949).

Through the first film Good and Evil, she met Mohamed Salman, who would eventually become her second husband, and her partner in professional and personal life for five years.

She sang professionally on stage and through radio stations in Lebanon, Syria, Egypt, Tunisia, Iraq, Kuwait, and more. The Syrian national radio station in Damascus holds hundreds of her recordings in perfect condition. Composers who wrote music for her to sing included Mohamed Mohsen, Philemon Wehbe, Mohamed Abdelkarim, Mohammed Abdel Wahab, Salim Helou, and Wadih Al-Safi. The 6th number of the Syrian National Radio Station magazine in its first year, entitled "Radio Diffusion Syrienne", mentions several weekly evening program broadcasts featuring Nourhane. On November 25, the evening program beginning at 6:30PM featured Nourhane singing "A little bit of my heart remains" composed by Mohamed Mohsen with lyrics by Omar Halabi, as well "Why do I love you?" composed by Abdel Wahab Karam with words by Ibrahim Kamel. On November 30, 1953, starting with Nourhane at 9:30pm singing "I called you my love" by Mohamed Mohsen with lyrics by Abdel Jalil Wehbe - followed by a 15 minute recorded improvisation by the buzuq virtuoso and Nourhane's friend Mohamed Abdelkarim. The same magazine also features a large portrait of Nourhane on its cover

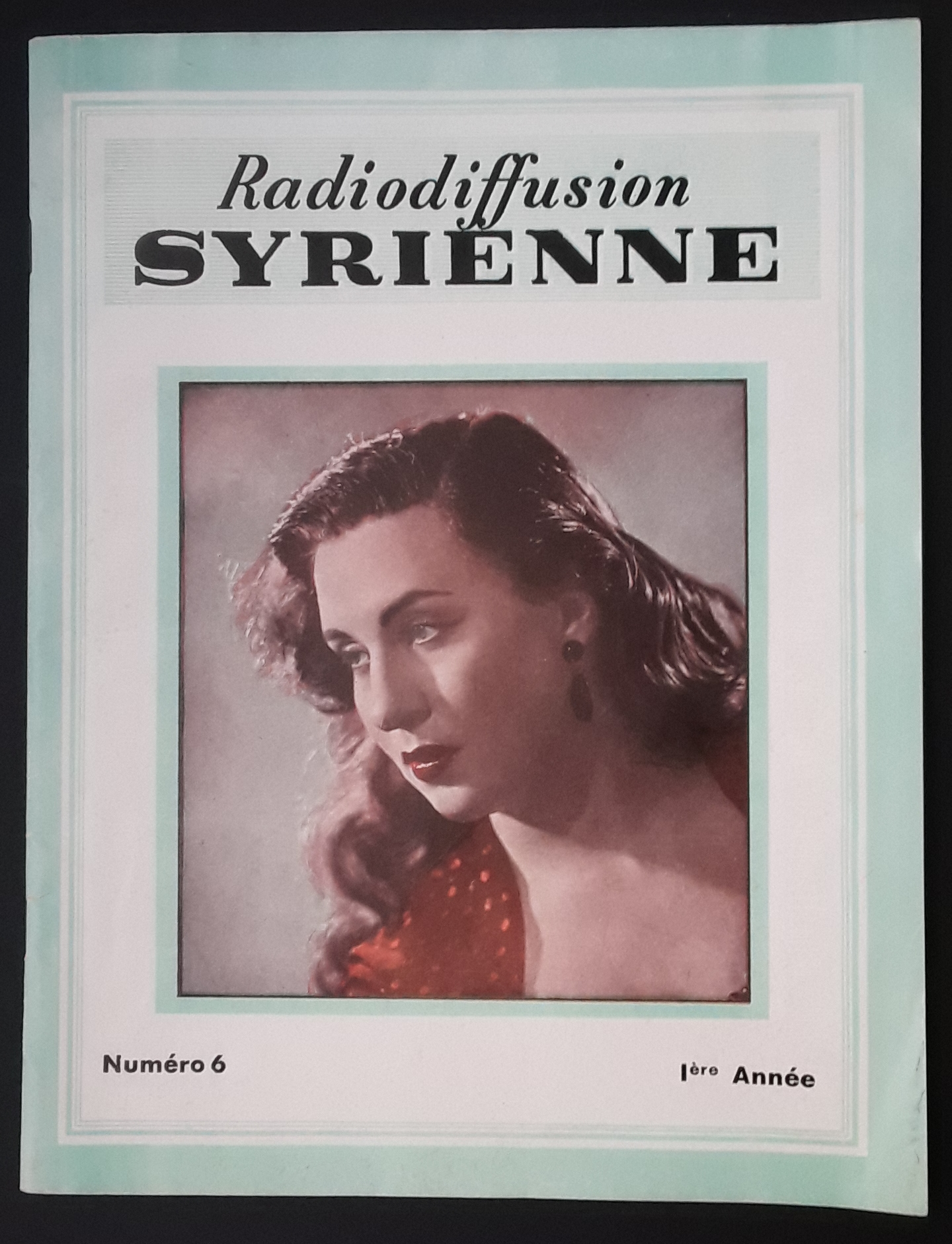
Nourhane on cover of Radio Diffusion Syrienne Magazine November 1953

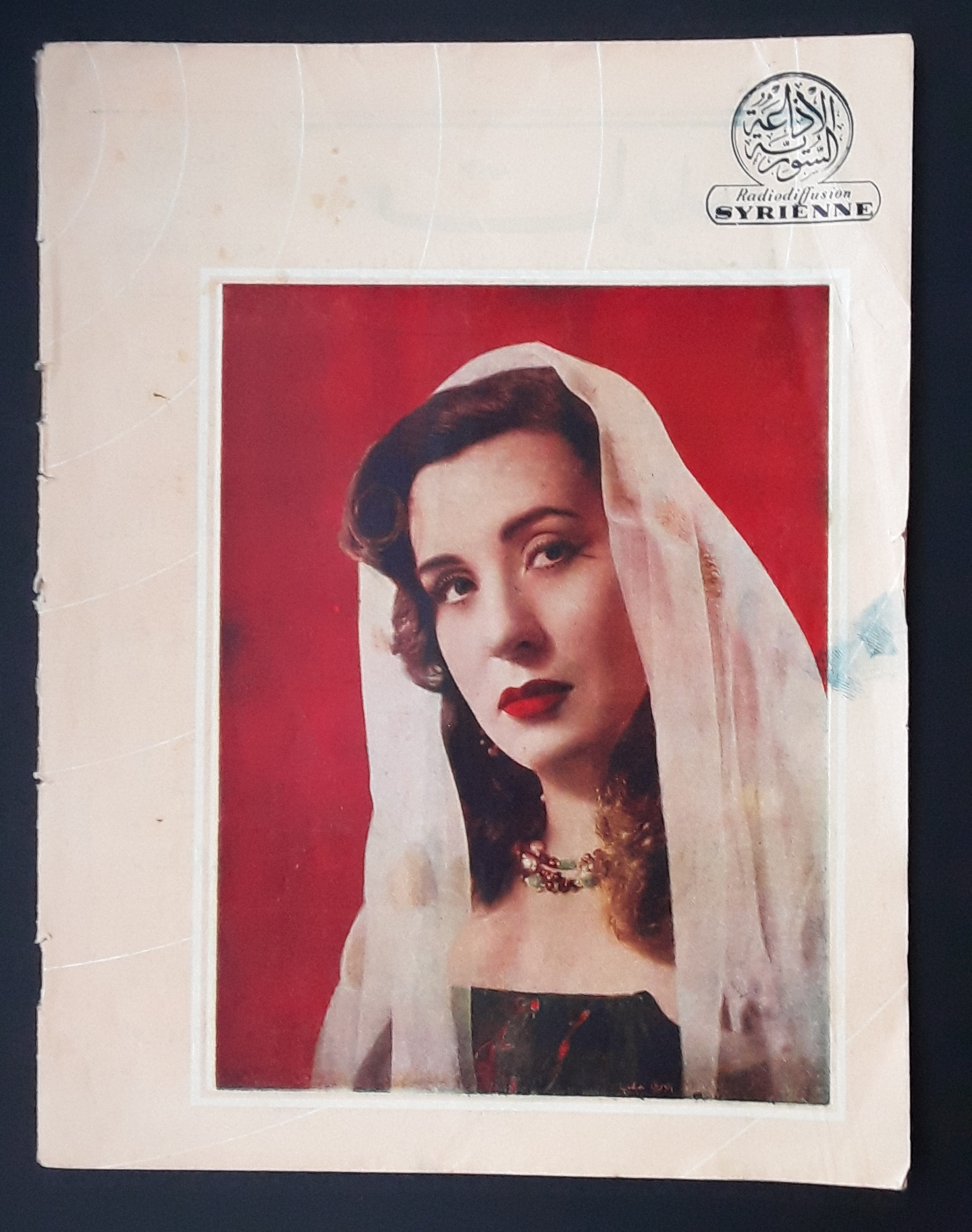
Nourhane on cover of Radio Diffusion Syrienne Magazine May 1958

From her personal archive, another issue of the same magazine features a portrait of Nourhane on its cover.

Since she was disappointed with the quality of the films she appeared in, although they may have had a certain degree of commercial success, she decided to opt out of any additional filmmaking adventures.

American researcher and educator Richard Melvin Breaux wrote "As Nourhane, Kheirieh continued to sing on stage and on radio, she recorded and through Farid El-Atrash, her music made its way state side and to Alamphon Records’ Farid Alam al-Din."

== Later life ==
Nourhane ended her career in the beginning of the 1960s and she opened up a hair salon in the Arnous area of Damascus. Her granddaughter, May Kassem made a film narrating her life story entitled "Nourhane, a child’s dream" which came out in 2016. Nourhane lived to be a hundred and died, at home, surrounded by her family, on February 28, 2022, in Beirut.

== Bibliography ==
Nourhane - Actress/Singer (as Norhan) listed in El-Cinema Egyptian Cinema Online Archive: Norhan - Actor Filmography، photos، Video

=== Songs ===
- "Ya Om Al Ouyoun al Kahila" (composer: Mohamed Mohsen) ياام العيون الكحيلة Nourhan sings Mohamad Mohsen
- "Hajarni wou Rah" (composer: Philemon Wehbe) هجرني وراح Nourhan sings Philemon Wehbe- Hajarni
- "Ishtaqna ya helou" (composer: Salim Helou) اشتقنا يا حلو Nourhan sings Salim Helou
- "Ya Zeno" (composer: Wadih Al-Safi) يا زينو (وديع الصافي) Nourhan sings Wadih Assafi
- "Fat Yom Min Ghayr Ma Tkalemni" (Composer: Abd al Wahab)(Radio Broadcast) فات يوم من غير ماتكلمني (اذاعية بصوت نورهان ) لحن عبد الوهاب فات يوم من غير ماتكلمني (اذاعية بصوت نورهان ) لحن عبد الوهاب
- "Mijana and Itaba" (with Mohamed Salman) - excerpt from film "Leila in Iraq" (1949) Dir. Ahmed Kamel Morsi ميجانا وعتابا (مع محمد سلمان) فيلم ليلى في العراق Nourhan- Mijana w Ataba (1949)

=== Films listed in El Cinema Egyptian Cinema Archive ===
- Son of the Orient (1945) Dir. Ibrahim Helmi فيلم - ابن الشرق - 1945 طاقم العمل، فيديو، الإعلان، صور، النقد الفني، مواعيد العرض
- Good and Evil (1946 release) (shot in 1945) Dir. Hassan Helmi فيلم - الخير والشر - 1946 طاقم العمل، فيديو، الإعلان، صور، النقد الفني، مواعيد العرض
- Leila in Iraq (1949) Dir. Ahmed Kamel Morsi فيلم - ليلى في العراق - 1949 طاقم العمل، فيديو، الإعلان، صور، النقد الفني، مواعيد العرض, الفيلم العراقي ـ ليلى في العراق ـ عفيفة اسكندر، ابراهيم جلال ـ ١٩٤٩

=== Anthology ===
Zibawi, Mahmoud; Makhoul, Assaad (2017). نجمات الغناء في الأربعينات اللبنانية [Famous Lebanese Singers from the 1940s]. Beirut: Alfurat Books Publishers. ISBN 978-9953-0-4203-9. OCLC 1089812335.

=== Press ===
- Mohamed Soueid (June 4, 2022). "نـــورهــان ســــلـوى الآه" [Nourhane, the consolation of O!]. Megaphone News.
- Breaux, Richard Melvin (April 1, 2022). "Nourhane: A Forgotten Singer, Rediscovered by Her Granddaughter". Midwest Mahjar.
- "إسمها مزيج من نور الهدى وأسمهان.. وعلى صوت أم كلثوم انطفأت نورهان" [Her name was a composite of Nour El Hoda and Asmahan, and she passed away while listening to Um Kulthum: Nourhane]. Voice of Lebanon VDL News. March 21, 2022.
- "مئة عام بين الضوء والظلّ: ورحلت "نورهان" نجمة الأربعينيات" [One hundred years between light and darkness: and Nourhane has disappeared - the Star of the 1940s]. Al-Akhbar. March 15, 2022.
- "المطربة نورهان نجمة الخمسينيات رحلت بصمت عن 100 عام" [The singer Nourhane, star of the 1950s, leaves in silence at the age of 100]. Independent Arabia. March 12, 2022.
- "نورهان الّتي رحلت بِصمت... ماذا تعرفون عن "صاحبة العيون الكحيلة"؟ (صور وفيديو)" [Nourhane who left in silence...What do you know about the one with the beautiful eyes?]. Annahar Daily Newspaper. Beirut. March 12, 2022.
- Boustany, George (March 5, 2022). "La DERNIERE LARME DE NOURHANE A ETE POUR MAY" [NOURHANE'S LAST TEAR DROP WAS FOR MAY]. L'ORIENT LE JOUR.
- Jarjoura, Nadim (June 17, 2019). "عن مطربة تعتزل باكرًا: نورهان وسحر الذاكرة" [About A Singer Who Quit Early: Nourhane And The Magic Of Memory]. Al-Arabi Al Jadeed.

=== Documentary ===
- May Kassem (2016). "Nourhane, a child's dream" – via Vimeo.
- Yousra Sharkawi (March 26, 2022). "نورهان.. ذكرى فنية من الأربعينيات ترويها حفيدتها" [Nourhane, an artistic memory from the 1940s told by her granddaughter"]. al-Ahram Daily Newspaper. Cairo.
- Merhi, Zahra (August 10, 2019). "مي قاسم: جدتي اعتزلت الفن وثابرت على متابعة كل جديد بعين ناقدة". Al-Quds Al-Arabi.
- "Interview by Zaven Kouyoumdjian with May Kassem about "Nourhane, a child's dream"". Future TV. 2019.
