= Nehad Qalei =

Syrian actor

Nehad Al-Kharboutli Al-Qalei
- Born: January 1, 1928; Zahlé, Lebanon
- Died: October 17, 1993 (aged 65); Syria
- Other name: Hosni Al-Borazan
- Occupations: Actor & Screenwriter
- Years active: 1960-1990

Nehad Qalei (Arabic: نهاد قلعي) was a Syrian actor and screenwriter. He was among the founders of Syrian Arab Television. Alongside Duraid Lahham, he formed one of the most iconic duos in Syrian television.

== Early life ==
Nehad Qalei was born as Nehad Al-Kharboutli Al-Qalei in the Lebanese city of Zahlé to a Syrian-Kurdish family. His father worked there in the telegraph and postal service. In the 1930s, they moved to Damascus, living first on Shura Avenue in the Al-Muhajreen neighborhood.

== Death ==
In 1976, Qalei was tragically paralyzed in an attack, which eventually led to his death in 1993. After having been hit by a chair over his head in the historic center of Damascus, he was paralyzed and then died a slow death. It is said that the person who beat him was one of the members of the Defense Brigades, founded by Rifaat al-Assad. Fellow actor and screenwriter Duraid Lahham and Qalei were staying up late at the Family Club restaurant in the Bab Touma before the attack happened.
