= Malak Sukkar =

Syrian actress

Malak Sukkar ملك سكر
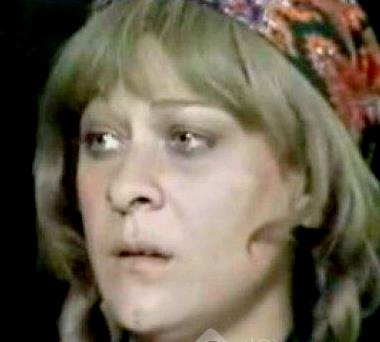
- Born: 27 December 1946 (age 79); Damascus, Syria
- Died: November 18, 1992
- Occupation: Actress
- Years active: 1964–1992

Malak Sukkar (Arabic: ملك سكر, 27 December 1946 – 18 November 1992) was a Syrian pioneer actress.

== Background ==
Malak Sukkar was born in 1930 in Damascus, she belonged to the Damascus based Sukkar family, which came from Baalbek modern-day Lebanon and settled in Damascus. She started her acting career in 1964. She appeared in 38 Syrian films. At the age of 62, she died of cardiovascular disease in 1992.

== Selected filmography ==
- Abu Kamel (1991)
- Al-Kheshkhash (1991)
- Hasad Al-sanin (1985)
- Maraya (1982)
- Al Haras (1981)
- Sari (1977)
- Bentol Badiah (1972)
