= Al-Hodoud =

- Directed by: Duraid Lahham
- Written by: Muhammad al-Maghut, Duraid Lahham
- Starring: Duraid Lahham, Raghda
- Release date: 1984
- Country: Syria
- Language: Arabic

Al-Hodoud (Arabic: الحدود) is a 1984 Syrian political comedy film directed by Duraid Lahham who played the main character and co-wrote the film with Muhammad al-Maghut.

== Overview ==
The film criticizes the idea of borders between Arabic countries, which is a recurring theme in other works by Lahham and Maghut.

It was included in The Greatest 100 Arabic Films list, released by Dubai International Film Festival in 2013.

== Cast ==
- Duraid Lahham: Abd el-Wadoud el-Tayieh
- Raghda: Sudfa
- Mohammed el-Akkad: Driver
- Mohammad el-Sheikh Najib: Sudfa's father
- Hassan Dakak: Checkpoint officer
- Rashid Assaf: Gharbstan patrol officer
- Ahmed Rafea: Sharqstan officer
- Mahmoud Zouhdi: Gharbstan officer
- Ahmad Melli: Mahmoud
