= Al-Kompars =

1993 film

Al-Kompars (The Extras) الكومبارس
- Directed by: Nabil Maleh
- Written by: Nabil Maleh
- Produced by: Ahmed Attia; Fabienne Servan-Schreiber
- Starring: Bassam Kousa; Wafaa Mouselley; Mohammed Sheikh Najeeb; Samar Sami
- Cinematography: Hanna Ward
- Edited by: Mohamed Ali Maleh
- Music by: Vahe Demerjian; Samir Hilmi
- Distributed by: General Organization for Cinema
- Release date: 1993
- Running time: 100 minutes
- Country: Syria
- Language: Arabic

Al-Kompars (Arabic: الكومبارس) (International title: The Extras) is a Syrian feature film by director Nabil Maleh. It features Bassam Kousa and Samar Sami.
