= Cinemacity Syria =

Movie theater in Damascus, Syria

Coordinates: 33.51324°N 36.29449°E

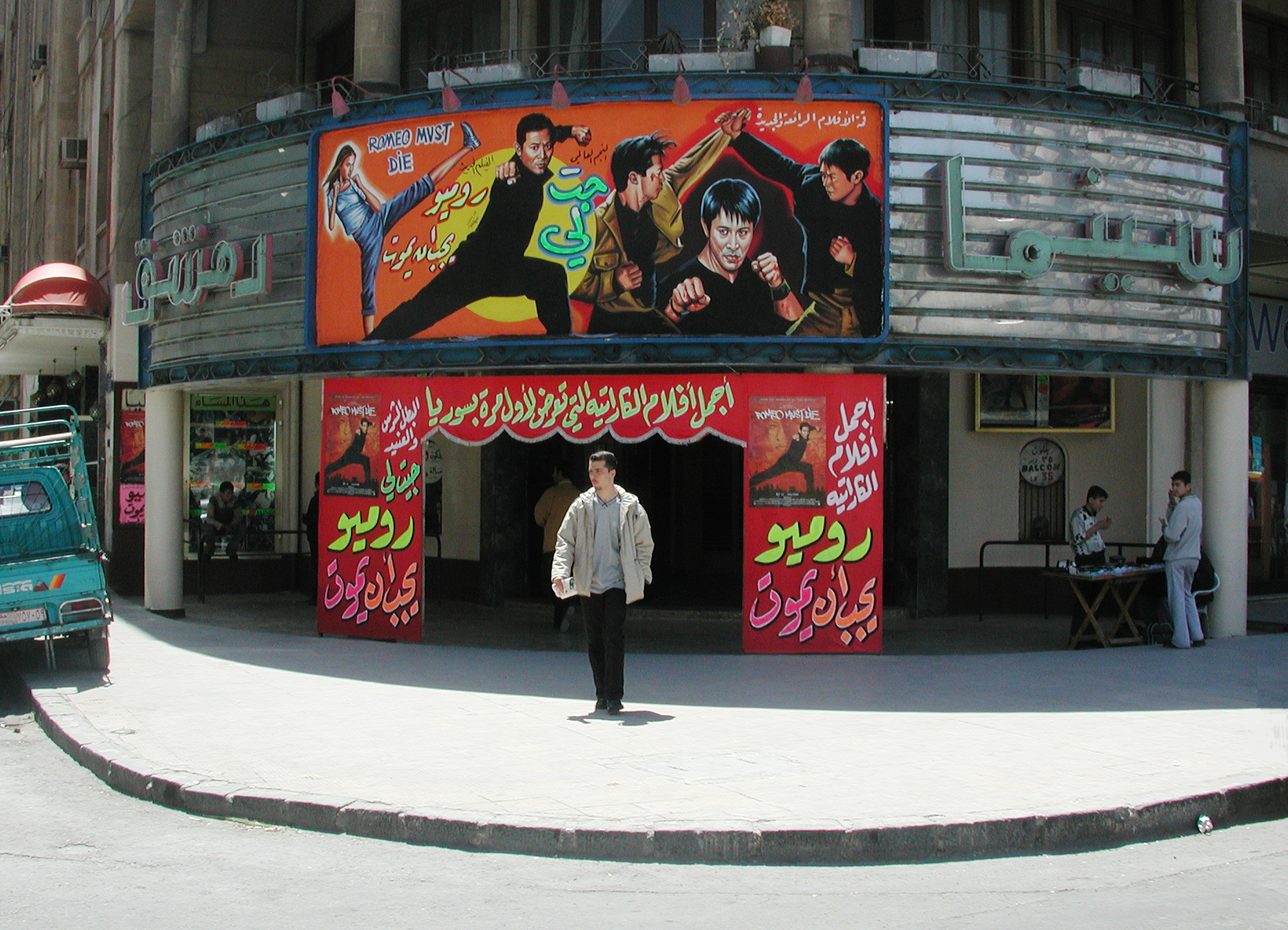
Cinema Dimashq in 2000

Cinemacity, formerly known as Cinema Dimashq (Cinema Damascus), is a movie theater in Damascus, Syria. The theater was one of the largest single room cinemas in the Arab World, with a total seating capacity of 1500, the ground floor seated 1000 moviegoers and a large balcony seated 500. It is currently the only cinema in Syria featuring the latest American and European productions. The movie theater currently features 4 medium-sized projection rooms of about 300 places each.

== History ==
Opened in 1943 by Toufik Chammas, a prominent local businessman, Cinema Dimashq rapidly became a local entertainment proxy, bringing Syria into the era of cinematography.

Closed in early 2005, and reopened in mid-2009, its current name is Cinema City. Completely renovated, the cinema now features a sushi bar, and digital projectors.

Cinema City did come under criticism as it was later accused of evading US sanctions imposed onto Syria since 2003, and projecting US movies the same day they would debut in the United Arab Emirates, Lebanon and other prevalent Arab countries.
