= Ayman Zeidan =

Jordanian actor

Ayman Zeidan أيمن زيدان
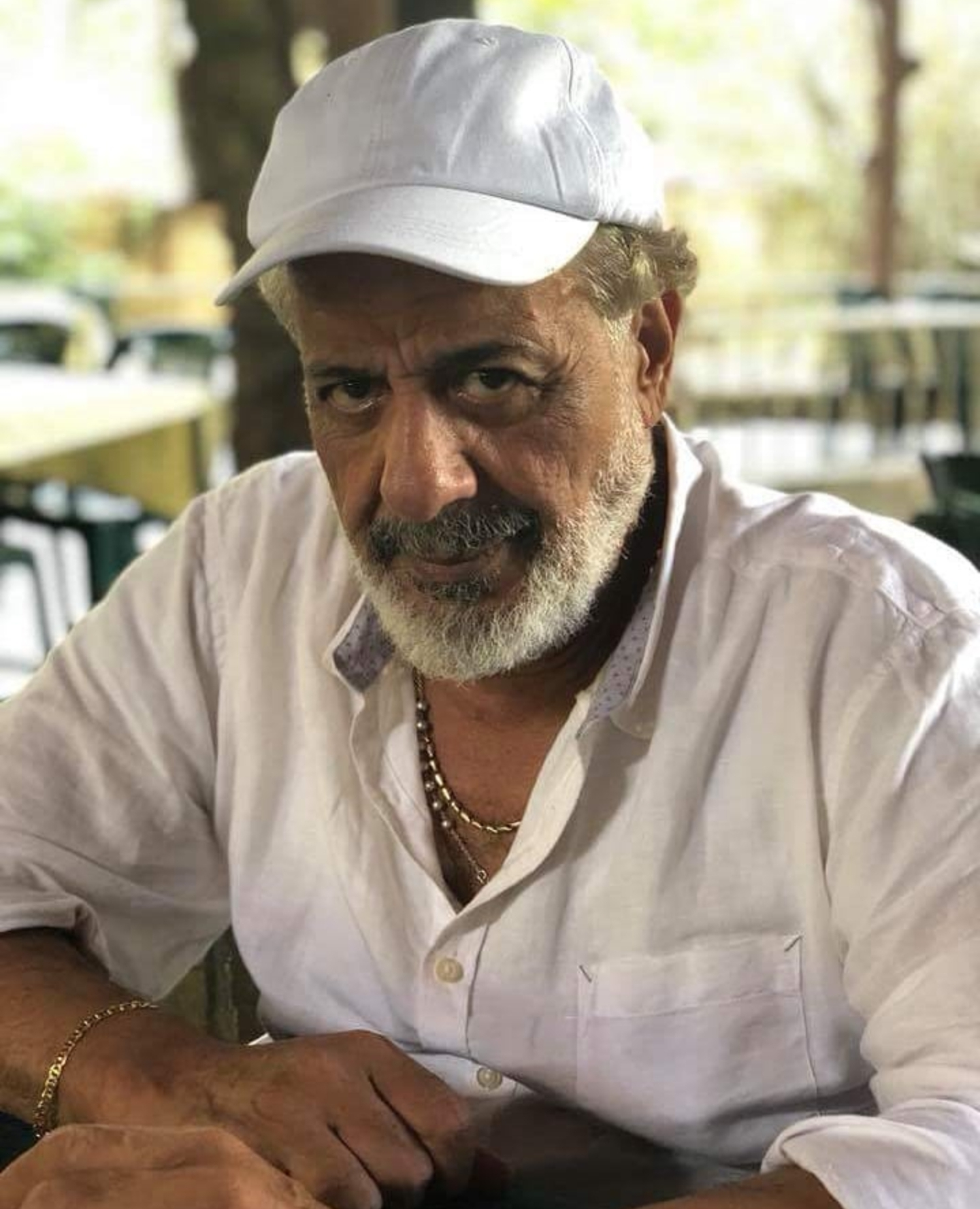
- Born: Ayman Al-Zeidani; 1 September 1956 (age 70); Al-Ruhaybah, Syria
- Occupation: Actor
- Children: Hazem, Ghaleb, Nawar (Note: Nawar died in 2011.), Noura, Youmna, Joudy

Ayman Zeidan (Arabic: أيمن زيدان; born 1 September 1956) is a Syrian TV presenter, comedian, voice actor and actor of film, television, and theater. Zeidan has starred in several notable television series and shows, and gained much success in sitcoms. Zeidan is also a regular theater actor. Additionally, Zeidan has had a few film and radio voice-over roles. Zeidan hosted the Sanaa TV game show, Waznak Dahab (Your Weight in Gold), and helped popularize the show.

== Early life and career ==
Ayman Ghaleb Shukri al-Zaidani, known as Ayman Zeidan, was born on September 1, 1956, in Al-Reheiba, a small town located 50 km northeast of Damascus. He grew up in a middle-class family, with his father, Ghaleb Zeidan, being chosen by Zahir al-Zaidani, representing the aspirations of the Zaidan family. Ayman was the eldest of five brothers and three sisters and was the first to pursue the dreams of his parents. He lived in a modest home of just 60 square meters, and his journey was filled with dreams and challenges.

In his youth, Ayman left his rural village to seek opportunities in the city. At the age of fourteen, he took on various jobs during summer vacations, working as a mechanic, a driver, a restaurant worker, and even a primary school teacher while attending university. He was the older brother of actors Shadi Zaidan and Wael Zeidan, and his cousin, Amir Zeidan, became a scholar of Sharia in the West. Due to his father’s work, Ayman eventually had to move to Damascus, where he first encountered the world of theater. During summer breaks, he would read theater scripts, which deepened his passion for the arts. Although his family initially opposed his interest in acting, he pursued it wholeheartedly.

After completing high school, Ayman enrolled in the Faculty of Law but only attended for one academic year before switching to the Faculty of Commerce. He still felt unfulfilled and, at the age of 22, decided to enroll in the Institute of Dramatic Arts in Jordan. There, he studied alongside future stars like Jamal Suleiman and learned from influential figures in the art world, including Assaad Fadl, Walid al-Quwatli, and the late Fawaz Al-Sagr. In 1978, he joined the Higher Institute of Dramatic Arts in Damascus, graduating in 1981 with a top honor.

In 2016, Ayman underwent a gastric surgery that helped him lose 35 kg, improving his health, mobility, and work performance.

== Career Beginning ==
After graduating from the Institute of Dramatic Arts, where theater had been his first love and the reason for his enrollment, Ayman Zeidan immersed himself in numerous plays, both as an actor and director. He dedicated much of his creative energy to the national theater and the mobile theater. His passion for theater eventually took him to Berlin, Germany, where he completed a course in theatrical production. Upon his return, he became the director of the mobile theater.

In 1983, Ayman decided to venture into television for the first time. Director Maamoun al-Bunni offered him a role in the series Women Without Wings. Shortly afterward, film director Muhammad Malas gave Ayman a major opportunity to showcase his talent on the big screen. He cast him in a significant role in the award-winning 1984 film Dreams of the City, marking a distinct beginning for Ayman in cinema.
