= Muna Wassef =

Syrian actress (born 1942)

- منى واصف
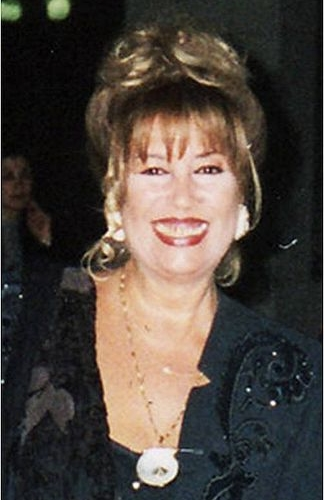
- Muna Wassef
- Born: Muna Mustafa Wassef Jelmran; 9 February 1942 (age 84); Damascus, First Syrian Republic
- Occupation: Actress
- Years active: 1960–present
- Notable work: Hind bint Utbah
- Spouse: Muhammad Shahin (m. 1963; died 2004)
- Children: Ammar Abdulhamid
- Awards: The Syrian Order of Civil Merit-Excellent Degree.

Muna Wassef (Arabic: منى واصف; born 9 February 1942), also spelled Mona Wasef, is a Syrian Kurdish stage, film and television actress. She is also a United Nations Goodwill ambassador. She is an icon in the Arab world and the Middle East. Wassef is credited for acting alongside Salah Zulfikar at the prime of her career in Memory of a Night of Love (1973). Wassef had become the highest-paid actress in the Arab World since the end of the 1970s until the year 2000; now she is one of the highest-paid actresses. Wassef is the first Syrian woman to receive the Syrian Order of Civil Merit–Excellent Degree in 2009. Mona Wassef is most known internationally for starring in Al Hayba with Taim Hasan, streaming on Netflix.

== Background ==
When she was 15 she worked as a cotton candy (Ghazl Al Banat) seller in the streets of Damascus. By the age of 16, she worked as a women's clothes saleswoman for one of Syria's most famous fashion designers at that time, and when she turned 17 she was already working as a fashion model for the same designer, at the same time becoming a popular folk dancer in a group called Omaya.

== Education ==
Although Wassef did not finish high school, she educated herself and learned to present the majority of her works in Standard Arabic. She studied masterpieces of world literature, Quranic Tajwid and Tartil, and reciting poetry.

She traveled to East Germany in 1973 where she took acting courses at the Brecht theater. Working with the Syrian Military Theater allowed her to develop her acting skills further.

== Early career ==
In 1960, Wassef submitted herself for a contest in which they chose actresses for the Military theater, which was part of the Syrian Ministry of Defense. She worked and learned there for about 2 years. In 1963 she married the Army General Muhammad Shahin, who was a film director as well. She worked in the symposium of Art and Thought which was sponsored by Dr. (Rafeq Al Sabagh) in presenting Shakespeare's The Merchant of Venice in 1963.

In 1964 she joined the Group for Dramatic Arts and starred in stage productions of the National Theater: productions such as Molière's Don Juan. This signaled the beginning of a very important stage in her career.

== Theater career ==
In theater, Muna Wassef, has starred in more than 25 plays by Arab and international playwrights. Her first play was Al Etr Al Akhdar wics. After that, she performed several plays in the Military Theatre inside the military units including:

- The Merchant of Venice
- Al Khajool Fe Al Kasr
- Al Aamaqby (Makseem Agorky)
- Donjuan
- Mawta Bela Goubour
- Tartuffe
- Al Zeer Salem
- Al Madnasa
- Hekayat Hob
- Al Masa Al Mutafaela
- Oedipus
- Al Mufatish Al Am
- Haram Mali Al Wazeer
- Bab al hara

== Film career ==
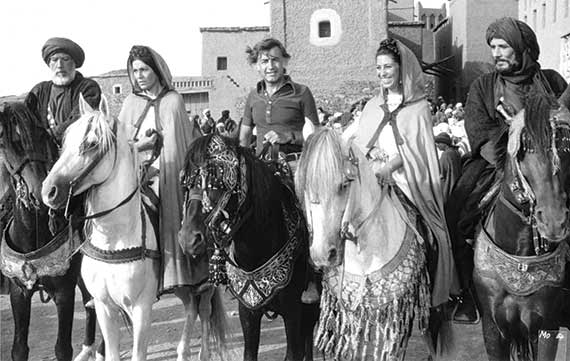
Muna Wassef (second from right ) among the cast of Al-Resala (The Message)

In film, Wassef has done more than 30 films, including:

- The Visit (1970)
- Memory of a Night of Love (1973)
- Another Face of Love (1973)
- al-Yazirli (1974)
- The Adventure (1974)
- The Opposite Direction (1975)
- The Message (1976)
- The Red, The White and the Black (1976)
- Heroes are Born Twice (1977)
- Photo Relics (1979)
- Fragments - UN RESTE D'IMAGES (1980)
- Sun on a Hazy Day (1986)
- Something is Burning (1993)
- The Sea (1994)
- Al Sadeqan
- Al Les Al Zareef
- Maqlab Men Al Makseek
- Emrah Taskn Whdaha
- Zekra Laylit Hob
- Al Ahmar Wa Al Abyad wa Al Aswad
- Al Etejah al Moakes
- Al Taleb
- Al Bazerki
- Baqaya Swar
- Al Shams Fe Yawm Ghaem
- Ah Ya Bahr
- Shaya Ma Yahtareq
- The Shadows of Silence (2007)
- Menahi (2008)
- Al Hayba: The Movie 2022

In 1974, Syrian-American film director Moustapha Akkad chose her to play the role of Hind in the Arabic version of his movie Al Risalah Mohammad, Messenger of God, which helped her achieve international recognition, with Anthony Quinn, and Irene Papas in the English version.

== Television career ==
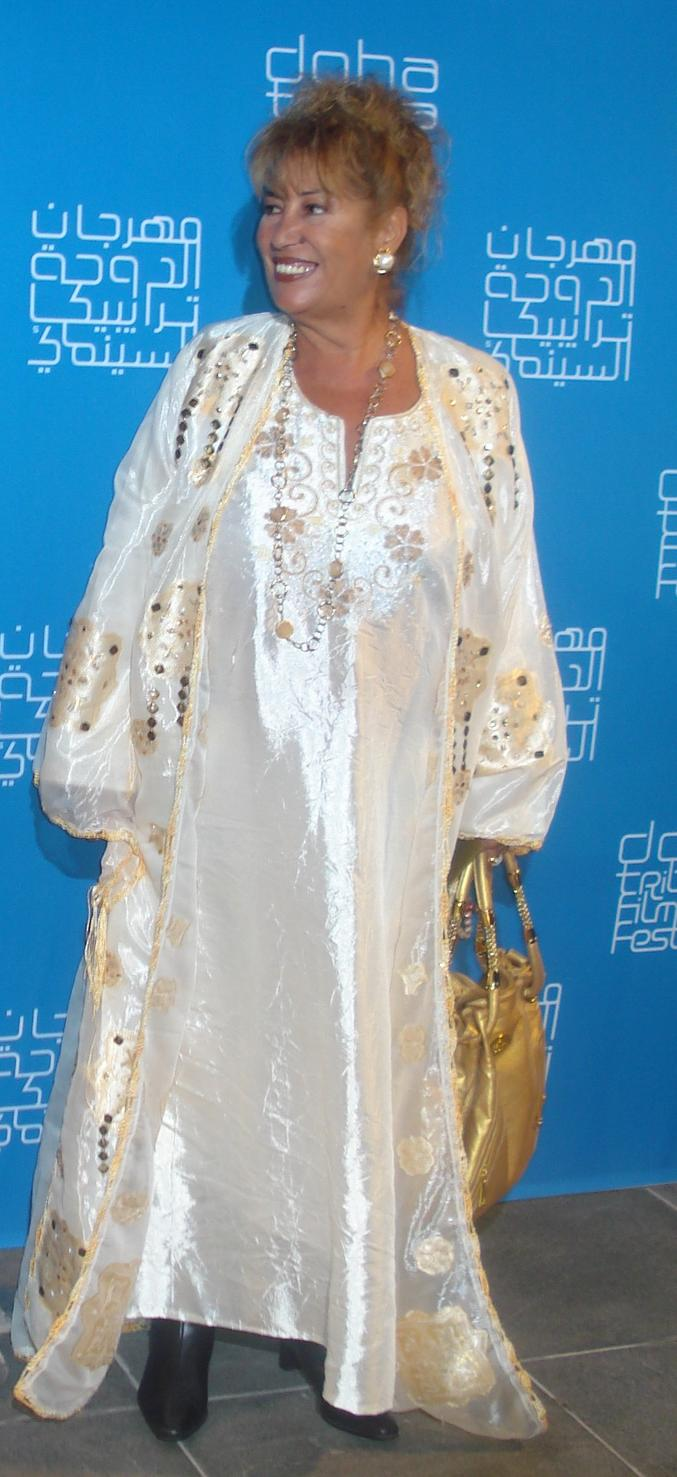
Muna Wassef attended the 2009 Doha Tribeca Film Festival

Every year Wassef stars in at least two or three TV series. She has done more than 200 series including:

- Hejrat Al qoulob Ela Al qoulob
- Ez Eddin Al Qassam
- Asad Al Warraq
- Al Zeer Salem
- Dalila Wa Al zaibaq
- Al Khansaa
- Saray
- Beomm Ayni
- Zaman Al Hob
- Arhal Wahidan
- Asiy Al Dama
- Hekayat Shahrazad Al Akhera
- Aqba Ben Nafea
- Al tareq
- Jawaher
- Layali Al Salhia
- Bukra Ahla
- The End of a Brave man
- The Sun Rises Again (2004)
- Salheaya Nights (2004)
- Mothers (2005)
- Hard Tears (2005)
- Tomorrow will be Better (2005)
- Speaking Border (2005)
- Al-Zahir Baibars (2005)
- The Best Days (2006)
- Little Projects (2006)
- People of love (2006)
- A Yard (2006)
- The story of love (2007)
- The neighborhood's Gate 2 (2007)
- Seraa Ala El Remal - Wars on Sand (2008)
- Alhoot- The Whale(2008)
- The neighborhood's Gate 4 (2009)
- Zaman Al3ar (2009)
- The Neighborhood's Gate 5 (2010)
- Alweladah Min Alkhaserah
- "Rejalek ya sham
- Omar bin Khattab (2012)
- Imam Alfuqaha
- Tahoon Alshar
- Alweladah Min Alkhaserah
- Al Hayba part I (2017)
- Al Hayba Al Awda Part II (2018)
- Al Hayba Al Hasaad Part III (2019)
- Al Hayba Al Rad Part IV (2020)

== Ramadan 2008 ==
Muna stars in Seraa Ala El Remal. The television series stars actors from the Arab world including Taim Hasan, Saba Mubarak, Hasan Awaytti and Bassel Khayat and is directed by Hatem Ali and written by Hany El-Saady. The series is a major TV production. It was produced by Dubai Media Incorporated. Its estimated cost is over $6 million. So far it is the most expensive Arabic TV production ever, and it was released in September 2008. The series, which is based on the vision and poetry of His Highness Sheikh Mohammed bin Rashid Al Maktoum, is a Bedouin epic that takes place in the Persian Gulf Bedouin desert at the beginning of the 18th century.

== Ramadan 2009 ==
In Ramadan 2009 she appeared in 4 productions. The main one is the most watched TV show in the Arab World ever, Bab Al Hara. She plays the role of a Christian woman who leads the female revolution in Damascus.

== Radio career ==
Muna Wassef presented some works in Radio as:

- Demashq Ya Nasmat Hozn.
- Rohy Hayati.
- Jazerat Al Marah.
- Muna and the short story program which was aired weekly.

In addition to so many poetic evenings and programs.

== Personal life ==
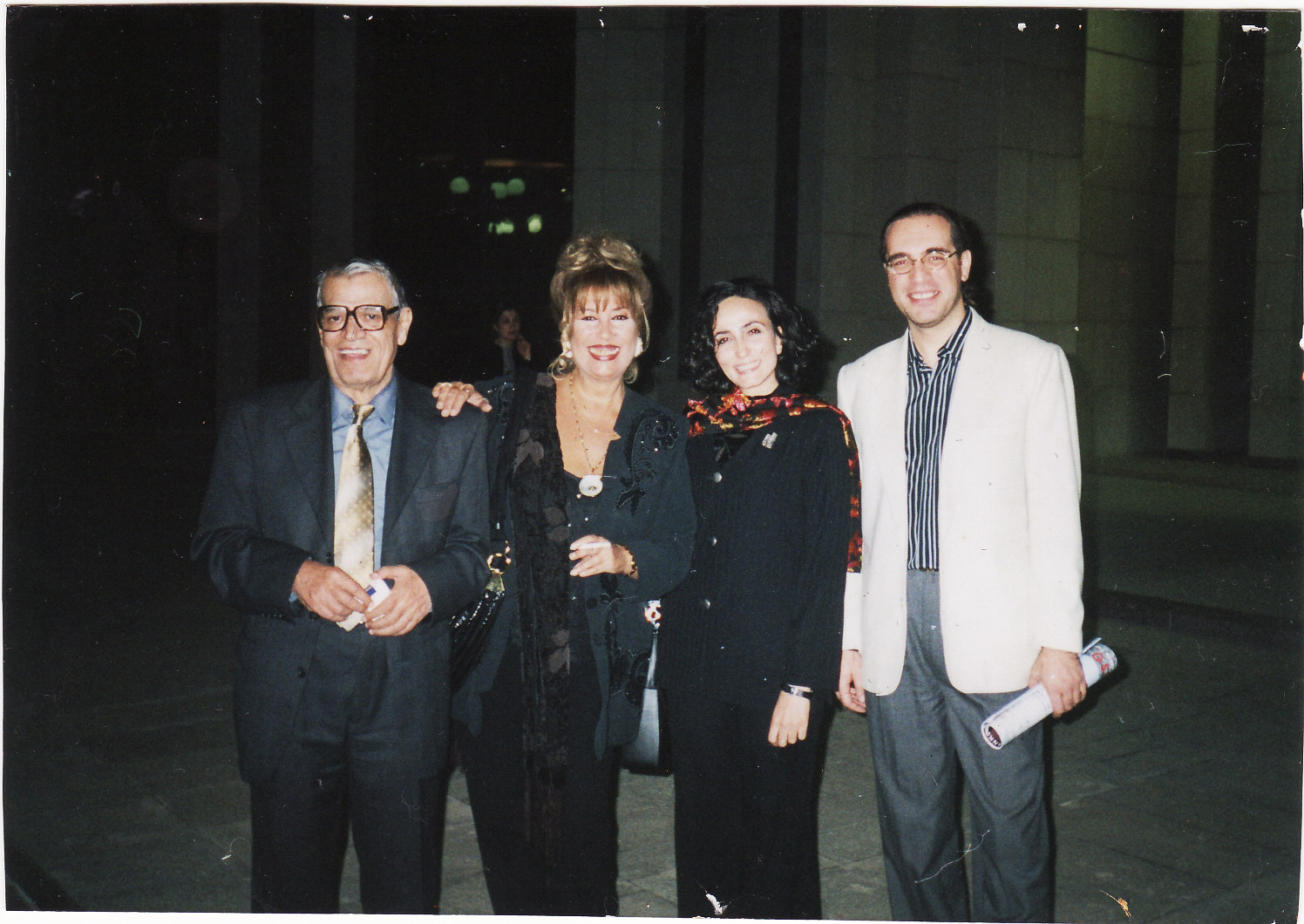
Muna Wassef, and her late husband military general and Film Director Muhammad Shahin, their son Ammar Abdulhamid and his wife Khawla.

Wassef has two younger sisters, Haifa and Ghada, who are also actresses. She was married to the late Syrian film Director Muhammad Shahin, and together they formed one of the Arab world's most popular celebrity couples. They have one son Ammar Abdulhamid, who lives in the United States, Washington, D.C., with his wife Khawla, daughter Oula (b. 1986) and son Mouhanad (b. 1990), both work in the public policy and humanitarian aid fields.

Currently, Wassef divides her time between her artistic career and her interest in issues pertaining to the emancipation of women in the Arab world.

== Awards ==
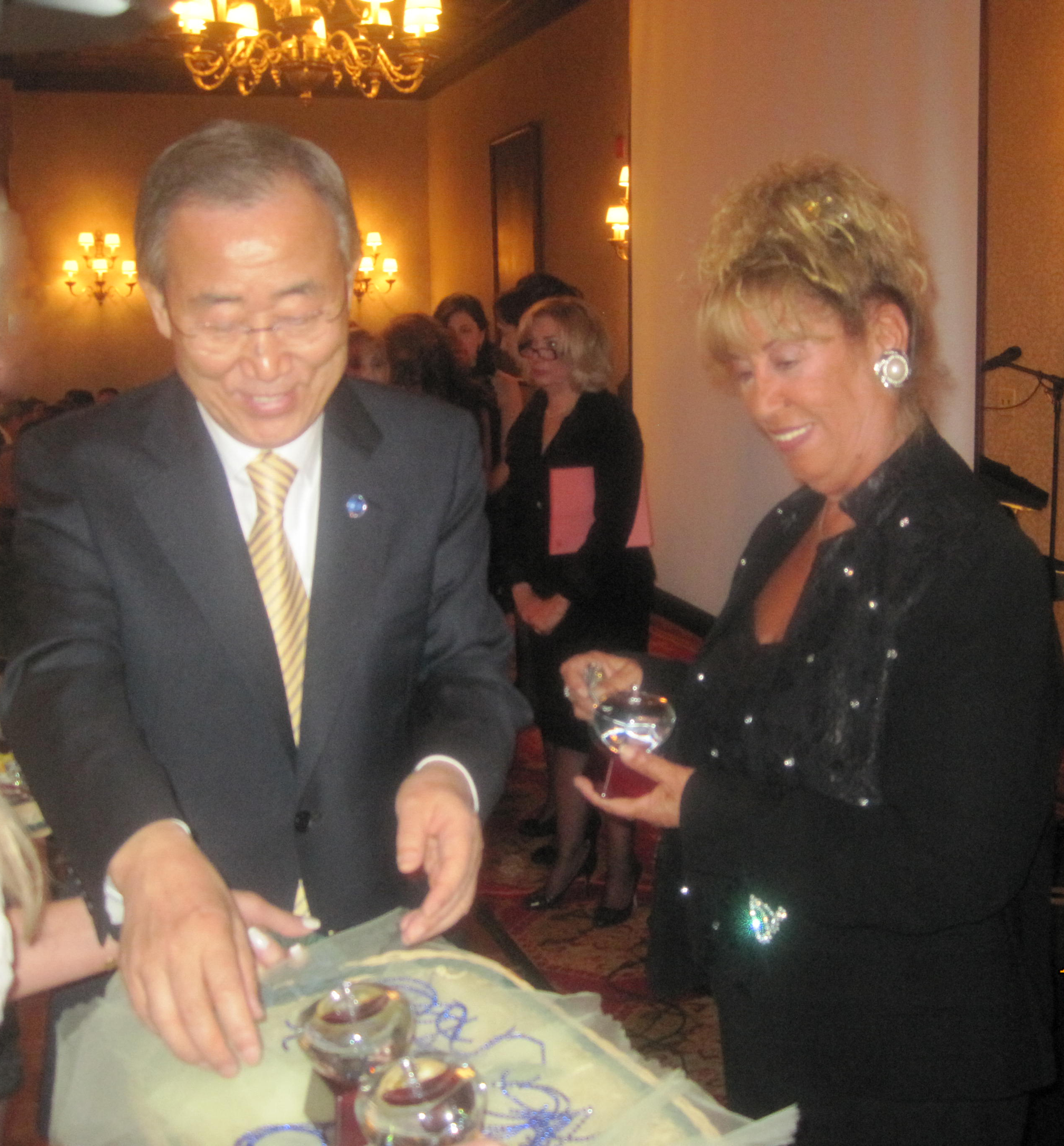
Muna Wassef and Ban Ki-moon

Honours and awards that Wassef has received:

- The Syrian Order of Merit-Excellent Degree 2009
- The Achievement Award ASMA Foundation represented by Ban Ki-moon 2010.
- Al-Fateh Medal (Libya)
- The Ghassan al-Kanafani Medallion
- Life Achievement Al- Ataa Award 1999.
- Life Achievement Award: Alexandria International Film Festival 2008
- Life Achievement Award: International Arab Film Festival in Oran 2008

She has received other awards in Tunisia, Libya, Jordan, Lebanon and Syria.

Muna is frequently invited to Arab countries to lecture and attend festivals, seminars and conferences. These have included:

- Damascus International Film Festival.
- Dubai International Film Festival.
- Cairo International Film Festival.
- Festival International du Film Arab Oran, (International Arab Film Festival in Oran).
- Middle East International Film Festival
- Doha Tribeca Film Festival.
- The Theatre Festival in Syria.
- The Sharja Theatre Festival.
- The Arab TV Festival in Bahrain.
- Carthage Cinema Days the Tunisian film festival.
