= Mohamed Chouikh =

Algerian film-maker and actor

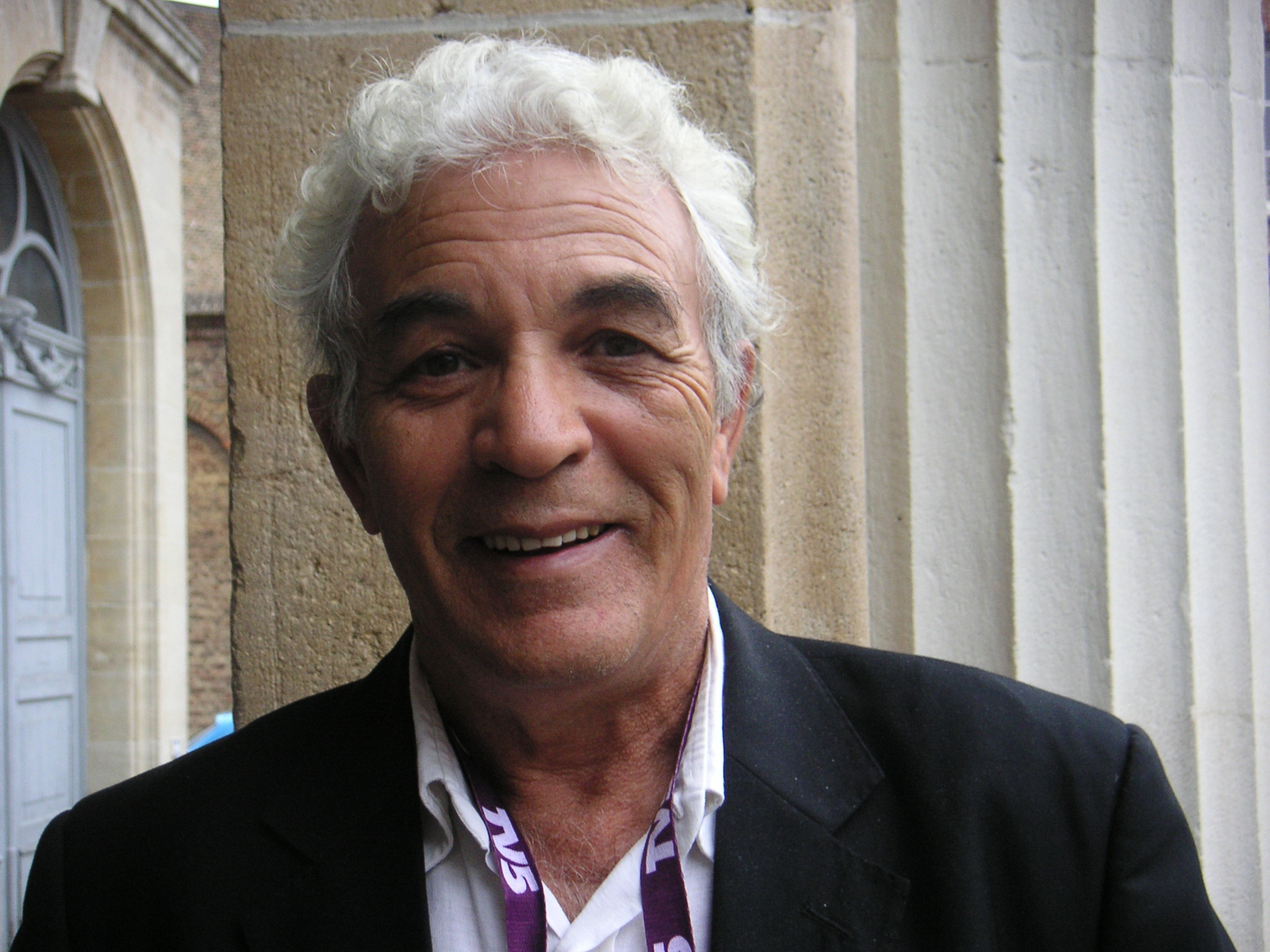
- Born: 3 September 1943 (age 83); Mostaganem, Algeria
- Occupations: Film director Screenwriter; Actor
- Notable work: The Citadel; The Ark of the Desert; Youcef

Mohamed Chouikh (born 1943) is an Algerian film-maker and actor.

== Biography ==
Mohamed Chouikh was born at Mostaganem, Algeria on 3 September 1943, where he was to become a stage actor with a troupe which later developed into the Algerian National Theatre. In 1965, he acted in one of Algeria's greatest film productions, L'Aube des damnés by René Vautier and Ahmed Rachedi. In 1966 he took the role of Lakhdar (the son) in Mohamed Lakhdar Hamina's highly successful Le vent des Aurès. In 1972 he directed L'Embouchure for Algerian TV, followed in 1974 by Les Paumés (1974). In 1982 he made his first feature-length film, Rupture, and has pursued a writer-director career since then.

== Filmography ==
Year	Film	Genre	Role
1965	L'Obstacle	Drama	Actor
1966	Rih al awras	Drama	Actor
1969	Les hors-la-loi	Drama	Actor
1970	Élise ou la vraie vie	Drama	Actor
1972	L'embouchure	TV Movie	Director
1974	Les paumés	TV Movie	Director
1976	Les nomades	Drama	Actor
1979	Mais où et donc Ornicar	Drama	Actor
1982	Rupture (al-Inquita – Breakdown)	Drama	Director Writer
1984	Maquam Echahid	Drama	Director
1988	La Citadelle (al-Qala – The Citadel)	Drama	Director Writer
1994	Youcef: La légende du septième dormant (Youcef kesat dekra sabera – Youcef: The Legend of the Seventh Sleeper)	Drama	Director Writer
1997	L'Arche du désert (The Desert Ark)	Drama	Director Writer
1999	Monnette	Short film	Actor
2003	Raqsat errihu	Adventure Drama Fantasy	Actor
2005	Douar de femmes (Douar al-nisaa – Hamlet of Women)	Drama	Director
2014	L'Andalou (Al Andalousee)		

== Awards and nominations ==
Year	Film	Festival	Award	Results
1988	The Citadel	Amiens International Film Festival	Golden Unicorn Award for Best Film	Won
1989	The Citadel	Festróia - Tróia International Film Festival	Golden Dolphin Award	Won
1990	The Citadel	Fribourg International Film Festival	Trigon Film Award	Won
1993	Youcef	Amiens International Film Festival	Prize of the City of Amiens	Won
1997	The Ark of the Desert	Locarno Film Festival	Golden Leopard Award	Nominated
1997	The Ark of the Desert	Namur International Festival of French-Speaking Film	Special Mention	Won
1997	The Ark of the Desert	Namur International Festival of French-Speaking Film	Golden Bayard award for Best Film (Meilleur Film Francophone)	Nominated
1998	The Ark of the Desert	Festróia - Tróia International Film Festival	Golden Dolphin Award	Nominated
1999	The Ark of the Desert	Ouagadougou Panafrican Film and Television Festival	Jury Special Prize	Won
1999	The Ark of the Desert	Ouagadougou Panafrican Film and Television Festival	OAU Award	Won
