= Supporting Roles =

1989 film

- Film poster
- Directed by: Orlando Rojas
- Written by: Orlando Rojas
- Starring: Rosa Fornes
- Release date: 1989
- Running time: 117 minutes
- Country: Cuba
- Language: Spanish

Supporting Roles (Spanish: Papeles secundarios) is a 1989 Cuban drama film written and directed by Orlando Rojas. The film was selected as the Cuban entry for the Best Foreign Language Film at the 62nd Academy Awards, but was not accepted as a nominee.

== Cast ==
- Rosa Fornes
- Juan Luis Galiardo
- Luisa Perez Nieto
- Ernesto Tapia

== See also ==
- List of submissions to the 62nd Academy Awards for Best Foreign Language Film
- List of Cuban submissions for the Academy Award for Best Foreign Language Film
