= Nabil Maleh =

- Born: September 28, 1936
- Died: February 24, 2016 (aged 79)
- Occupation: Filmmaker
- Years active: 1964-2016
- Known for: The Leopard; Al-Kompars a/k/a The Extras

Nabil Maleh (September 28, 1936 – February 24, 2016) was a Syrian film director, screenwriter, producer, painter and poet; he is thought to be a father of Syrian cinema. Nabil has published more than 1,000 articles, short stories, essays and poems. He is the writer and director of 120 short, experimental and documentary works and 12 feature-length films including The Extras and The Leopard. He has more than 60 awards at international film festivals, including several lifetime achievement awards. Several of his films are in the curriculum of international film schools, and he has taught film direction, acting, writing and aesthetics at many universities, centers and associations, including the University of Texas at Austin and the University of California in Los Angeles.

== Early life ==
Maleh was born into an upper middle class Damascus family. When Nabil was 14 years old, he used to write political articles for local newspapers. Later at 16 years, he went to Czech Republic to study nuclear physics. However, he immediately fell in love with the film industry when he was asked to be an extra in a film; so he went to study in Prague Film School (FAMU), whose students then included Miloš Forman and Jiri Menzel. While a student he worked at the Arab Radio Transmission, an Arabic language Czech station aimed at the Middle East. Nabil's school years were full of cultural inspiration: “In addition to the technical side and high artistic standards, FAMU created and developed a very sophisticated cultural base for the filmmaker. Culture was a part of daily life—a daily event—a new book, play, concert, an engaging debate. And everything was accessible. It is the only place I found where culture was free of charge. I lived for one month in Prague for what a concert with bad seats would have cost in Paris.” He finished school and returned home in 1964, but in a year he went abroad again.

== Director's career ==
After graduation in 1964 and returning to Syria, Maleh was proclaimed as the first European film graduate in his native country. He was invited to a new established National Film Organization in order to control and direct one of the organization's first feature films. Maleh wrote a scenario based on Syrian author Haydar Haydar’s novel The Leopard. A week before shooting was scheduled to begin, the Ministry of Interior banned the film from being shown. Only in 1971 was the film released in rent and Maleh became popular. “The Leopard” had a big success and introduced Syrian cinema to the global stage. Maleh shot many films about war in Palestine and Vietnam. The film Labor was banned in Syria because it had a negative portrayal of a government figure. In 1979 Maleh's second film Fragments was released. Despite the film's success, the director's relationship with the Syrian government went downhill. He left Syria for the United States, where he taught film production at the University of Texas at Austin and the University of California, Los Angeles on a Fulbright Grant. He spent the next 10 years in Europe, mostly in Greece, continuing to write. In 1992, Syria's National Film Organization invited him back to direct the film in Damascus to direct his next major work, The Extras.

With his production company Ebla — named for a Bronze Age fount of Syrian civilization — Maleh produced several documentaries for foreign markets, including A Bedouin Day, narrated in English and distributed in Europe by a British company.

Continuing to write, he produced a screenplay, a political thriller about an escaped Iraqi official hiding among tourists in Lebanon. The film Hunt Feast was shot in 2005 as a Syrian-British joint venture, but remains locked in a legal battle. The following year the Dubai International Film Festival honored Maleh, along with American director Oliver Stone and Bollywood star Shah Rukh Khan, for his outstanding contribution to cinema.

== Films ==
Nabil Maleh became the father of Syrian cinematography, he was not only director, but also a scriptwriter and producer. His works were appreciated in the World community. His first film Family Problem (1964) had duration of 35 minutes and premiere took its place in Prague. After that film, Nabil Maleh created three more works that were sponsored by Syrian TV, A Surprise, Dreams, and Two Man and Woman. All the films lasted for 70 minutes. Through his films, Nabil Maleh was reacting at modern issues such as Palestinian conflict or Vietnam War. Napalm (1970) was Maleh's reaction to the injustice taking place in Vietnam and Palestine. The director always tried to go along with modern problems, and the influence of 'outside' issues always could be seen in his works. For example, the short documentary film Rocks (1970) was created in order to show the hard conditions of quarry workers. The most influential film was made in 1970, Men Under the Sun, where Nabil Maleh expressed the struggle of the Palestinian people. The director's most productive period was in the 1970s. During this decade, Nabil Maleh created a name for himself in global society. The Leopard (1972) brought fame to Mr. Maleh. For the filming of The Leopard the director received the Locarno International Film Festival’s Special Prize. In this film Mr. Maleh expressed confrontations between feudal system in Syria and rivals. In 1981 Nabil Maleh left Syria, and, after 10 years, he produced one of the most popular films of his filmography: The Extra (1993). In this film, Nabil Maleh raised the common issue of relationships between men and woman, that was very sharp in Syria. When a young man and widow try to be with each other, they face condemnation from society.

== Documentaries ==
Along with the harsh films, Nabil Maleh was working on a number of documentaries that were expressing different issues in Gulf countries. The documentary A Bedouin Day (1981) could be the best example of Mr. Maleh's close familiarity with the outside world, and the speed with which he responded to different events. A Bedouin Day is a response to the West's portrayal of Arab people. The documentary shows how difficult life is for Bedouins. The Holy Crystal (2008) is a short 26-minute documentary describing Syrian society consisting of Muslim and Christian people. Documentary describes how such a neighborhood influence Syrian economic and cultural life. The theme of relationships between Muslim and Christian people in Syria was close to Nabil Maleh. In the same year, 2008, the director was also inspired to film Damascene Bouquet that lasted for 13 minutes. In this short documentary there is a lot of meaning. The documentary describes a rare event that took place in 2006: Christmas coincided with Muslim Eid. These are the main celebrations in both religions, and Nabil Maleh demonstrated how two communities were working together in order to celebrate. While the West was trying to portray Arab communities negatively, Nabil Maleh was trying to bring to light the truth over religion question.
