= Naji Jaber =

Syrian actor (1940–2009)

- Born: February 9, 1940; Shahba, Syria
- Died: March 30, 2009 (aged 69); Damascus, Syria
- Years active: 1967–2008

Naji Jaber (Arabic: ناجي جبر, romanized: Naji Jabr), was a Syrian actor who was foremost identified with the character Abu Antar (أبو عنتر).

== Career ==
Following his older brother Mahmoud, Naji Jaber pursued a career in acting by 1967 and became a member of the Syrian Actors' Syndicate in 1972. The greatest turn in his career came the same year with the popular sitcom Wake Up Time (صح النوم) where he was cast for the stereotypical Damascus thug character named Abu Antar. The character contrasted with the light-hearted protagonist Ghawar al-Toshi (Duraid Lahham) and Abu Antar soon became one of the most popular characters in the show (along with Husni al-Borazan played by Nehad Kaleai). He played the same character in following Ghawar series on TV and also in the motion picture Ghawar Empire (امبراطورية غوار) released in 1982. Jaber's character became so popular that "Abu Antar is a symbol of strength and humor throughout the Arab World". Nevertheless, one of his exceptional but prominent roles was in Dreams of the City in 1984.

and share for Shaytan Al Jazzirah (1978), Sah Al-Nawm (1975) and Amoot marratayn wa uhibbuk (1976).

== Family ==
Jaber came from a Druze family of actors and actresses that includes Mahmoud and Haitham Jaber (brothers), Layla and Maryam Jaber (nieces) and Dana Jaber (grandniece).

== Death ==
Jaber died from cancer on 30 March 2009 at 69 years of age. His brother, Mahmoud Jaber, also died of cancer in July 2008 at 73 years of age.
