= The Hairdresser =

2010 film

- Film poster
- German: Die Friseuse
- Directed by: Doris Dörrie
- Starring: Gabriela Maria Schmeide; Natascha Lawiszus
- Release dates: 14 February 2010 (BIFF); 18 February 2010 (Germany)
- Running time: 106 minutes
- Country: Germany
- Language: German

The Hairdresser (German: Die Friseuse) is a 2010 German comedy film directed by Doris Dörrie.

== Cast ==
- Gabriela Maria Schmeide as Kathi
- Natascha Lawiszus as Julia
- Ill-Young Kim as Tien
- Christina Große as Silke
- Rolf Zacher as Joe
- Maria Happel as Centerleiterin
- Maren Kroymann as Frau Krieger
