= Ighraa =

Syrian actress

- إغراء
- Born: Nihad Alaeddin (نهاد علاء الدين); February 19, 1942 (age 84); Damascus, Syria
- Occupations: Actress, screenwriter, film director
- Years active: 1959–1992

Ighraa (Arabic: إغراء), (bon on 19 February 1942) is a Syrian actress. She became known for her work in Syrian cinema, particularly during the 1960s and 1970s, and was one of the prominent actresses of that period.

Ighraa appeared in numerous films. Among her best-known works are Al-Fahd (The Leopard, 1972) and Raqisa Ala al-Jirah (Dancer on the Wounds, 1974).

== Early life ==
Nihad Alaeddin (Arabic: نهاد علاء الدين) was born on 19 February 1942 in Damascus, Syria. She grew up in Damascus, where she later began her career in the Syrian film industry. She adopted the stage name Ighraa, under which she became known to audiences.

== Career ==
Ighraa began her acting career in the late 1950s. Her early film appearances included Al-Hubb al-Akhir (The Last Love) and Awdat al-Hayat (Return of Life), both released in 1959.

=== Rise to prominence ===
Ighraa became widely known in Syrian cinema during the 1960s and 1970s. She appeared in several films that attracted attention for their treatment of social issues and their departure from prevailing conventions in Arab cinema.

One of her most notable roles was in Al-Fahd (The Leopard), a 1972 film directed by Nabil Maleh and based on a story by Haidar Haidar. The film also featured Adib Qaddoura, Asaad Fadda and Salim Sabri. It became an important work in the history of Syrian cinema.

She also appeared in Raqisa Ala al-Jirah (Dancer on the Wounds, 1974) and Amoot Marratayn wa Uhibbuk (I Die Twice and Love You, 1976).

=== Screenwriting and directing ===
In addition to acting, Ighraa worked as a screenwriter and producer. She wrote and contributed to the production of several films in which she also appeared. She later expanded her work into film directing, including the film Banat al-Karateh (Karate Girls).

Her work across acting, writing and directing made her one of the women involved in several aspects of Syrian film production during this period.

=== Public image ===
Ighraa attracted attention for her performances in films that challenged conservative social expectations. Her roles and her public statements about artistic freedom made her a controversial figure in Arab cinema.

In a 2010 profile published by The New York Times, she discussed her career and her views on the controversial scenes she had performed. She described her artistic choices as a matter of personal conviction.

=== Return to cinema ===
In April 2023, it was announced that Ighraa would return to acting after an absence of approximately three decades in the Syrian short film Azma Qalbiya (Cardiac Crisis), directed by Amr Ali and produced by the National Film Organization in Syria. The film follows an elderly woman waiting for members of her family on the morning of a holiday.

Ighraa played the character Dalal in the film, which also featured Ahmed Rafea, Amir Brazi and Ahmed Eid. It was released in Egypt on 28 April 2024, marking her return to cinema after an absence of around three decades.

== Filmography ==
Year	Title	Role or contribution
1959	Al-Hubb al-Akhir (The Last Love)	Actress
1959	Awdat al-Hayat (Return of Life)	Actress
1960	Al-Ghajariyya	Actress
1960	Al-Layali al-Multahiba	Actress
1964	Badawiat fi Paris	Actress
1964	Aqd al-Lulu	Actress
1967	Ariyat Bila Khatia (Naked Without Sin)	Actress and screenwriter
1969	Ghazalan	Actress
1971	Imra'a Taskon Wahdaha	Actress
1972	Al-Fahd (The Leopard)	Actress
1972	Rehlet Hob	Actress
1973	Arous min Demashq	Actress
1973	Wagh Akher lel Hob	Actress
1973	Al-Matloob Ragol Wahed	Actress
1973	Serb Al Abtal	Actress
1974	Al-Mughamara	Actress
1974	El Sayed El Takadomy	Actress
1974	Karakouz Tent	Actress
1974	Raqisa Ala al-Jirah (Dancer on the Wounds)	Actress
1974	Banat lilahabi	Actress
1975	The Belle & the Space Conqueror	Actress
1976	Amoot Marratayn wa Uhibbuk (I Die Twice and Love You)	Actress
1977	The Beautiful Journalist	Actress
1977	Al-Kademoon Men Al-Behar	Actress
1977	Goodbye to Yesterday	Actress
1978	Earth Wedding	Actress
1980	Fake Love	Actress
1980	Nazawat Emra'a	Actress
1981	Banat al-Karateh (Karate Girls)	Actress and director
1982	Reluctant Girls	Actress
1983	Emra'a La Tabeea Al-Hob	Actress
1984	Shaheen	Actress
1986	Bint Sharqia	Actress
1987	Banat al-Istirad	Actress and director
1990	Emra'a Fi Al-Haweya	Actress
1992	Al-Makouk	Actress
2024	Azma Qalbiya (Cardiac Crisis)	Actress
