= Duraid Lahham =

Syrian comedian and director

Duraid Lahham دريد لحام
- Born: February 11, 1934 (age 92); Damascus, Syria
- Years active: 1958–present
- Spouse: Hala Bitar
- Children: 3

Duraid Lahham (Arabic: دريد لحام; in Roman transliteration, sometimes spelled "Durayd Lahham") is a leading Syrian comedian and director born 1934 in Damascus, Syria to a Syrian father and a Lebanese mother. He is famous for acting the role of "Ghawwar El Toshe" in a number of movies and series. His co-star throughout his career was Nehad Qalei who played the role of "Husni Al Borazan".

== Work ==
From 1960 to 1976, Lahham and Qali performed as "Duraid and Nihad," and became highly successful and famous among various Arab audiences. By 1976, Nihad had to retire due to an illness. From then on, Lahham wrote, acted, and directed his own work.

Lahham's work was greatly influenced by political events in the Arab World and this was reflected in the plays he wrote and directed. His films also carry political overtones and have been described as "deal[ing] with the artificiality and impracticality of borders between Arab states and with the abuse of human rights in the Arab world."

== UNICEF Goodwill Ambassador ==
Lahham was appointed UNICEF Goodwill Ambassador to the Middle East and North Africa region in 1999. In 2004, he visited districts of Southern Lebanon which had been liberated from Israeli occupation. At a press conference, he gave a speech criticizing George W. Bush and Ariel Sharon, comparing them to Hitler. This caused Tel Aviv to protest Lahham's "undiplomatic language" to UNICEF, which resulted in UNICEF relieving him of his duties.

== Recognition ==
Lahham received several medals in recognition of his contributions:

- In 1976, Hafez al-Assad, Syrian President at the time, awarded Lahham with the Order of Civil Merit, Excellence Class.
- In 1979, Tunisian President Habib Bourguiba awarded him with a medal in recognition of his work.
- In 1991, Libyan President Muammar al-Gaddafi awarded him a medal.
- In 2000, Lahham received The Order of Merit of the Lebanese Republic, awarded to him by Lebanese President Émile Lahoud.

== Filmography ==
=== Cinema ===
- Khayat Al-Sayyidate
- Allaz Al-Zareef
- Al-Hudood (1984)
- Al-Taqreer
- Ghriam Fee Istanbul
- Fendooq Al-Ahlam
- Imber Atwareaya Ghawwar
- Al-melyouneara
- 'aqed Al-lu' lu'
- Sah Al-Noum
- Kafroun
- Al-Muziafoun
- Mesek wa 'ember (Meratee Melyouneara)
- Samak Bala Hasak
- Al-Sa'aleek
- Imra'ah Taskoun Wahdaha
- Laqa' Fee Tahmer
- Al-Wardah Al-Hamra'
- Al-Tha'lab
- La'eb Al-Kura
- Zogatee Min Al-Habiz
- Al-Nasabeen Al-Thalatha
- 'indama Ta'gheeb Al-Zowagat
- Ana' 'antar
- Wahid + Wahid
- Al-Sadeeqan
- Al-Shereadan
- Ghawwar Jemis bounid
- Muqalib Fee Al-Mekseek
- Ramal Min Dheheb
- Al-Rajel Al-Munasib
- Al-Aba'a Al-Sighar
- Celina (musical)
- Damascus Aleppo (2019)

=== Television ===
- Ahlam Abu Al hana
- Aaelati wa ana
- Al Kherbeh
- Hammam El-Hana
- Sah Elnoum
- Melh ou Sukar
- Wayn El Ghalat
- Al Doughri
- Aoudat Ghawar
- Maa'leb Ghawwar
