= List of Syrian films =

This is a list of Syrian films.

== 1970s ==
=== 1971 ===
- A Woman of Fire

=== 1973 ===
- The Dupes (Tewfik Saleh)
- Memory of a Night of Love
- Wajh Akhar Lil Hub (Muhammad Shahin)

=== 1974 ===
- Al-Mughamara (Muhammad Shahin)
- Everyday Life in a Syrian Village (Omar Amiralay)

=== 1975 ===
- Kafr kasem (Borhane Alaouié)

== 1980s ==
- Dreams of the City (Mohamed Malas)

=== 1981 ===
- Hadithat el-Nosf Metr (The Half-Meter Incident) (Samir Zikra)

=== 1983 ===
- Ahlam al-Madina (Mohamed Malas)

=== 1986 ===
- Al-Shams Fi Yawam Gha'em (Muhammad Shahin)
- Waqae'h al-'Am al-Muqbel (Chronicles of the Coming Year) (Samir Zikra)

=== 1987 ===
- Al-Manam (Mohammad Malas)

=== 1988 ===
- Layali Ibn Awa (Abdellatif Abdelhamid)

== 1990s ==
=== 1992 ===
- Al-Lail (Mohamed Malas)

=== 1993 ===
- Al-Kompars (Nabil Maleh)

=== 1996 ===
- On a Day of Ordinary Violence, My Friend Michel Seurat... (Omar Amiralay)

=== 1997 ===
- There Are So Many Things Still to Say (Omar Amiralay)
- A Plate of Sardines (Omar Amiralay)

=== 1998 ===
- Nassim al-Roh (Abdellatif Abdelhamid)
- Turab al-Ghuraba' (Land for A Stranger) (Samir Zikra)

=== 1999 ===
- A1 (Muhammad Ali Adeeb)

== 2000s ==
=== 2000 ===
- The Man With Golden Soles (Omar Amiralay)

=== 2001 ===
- Ahla Al- Ayam (Muhammad Ali Adeeb)
- Qamaran wa Zaytouna (Abdellatif Abdelhamid)
- The Jar: A Tale From the East (Ammar Al Sharbaji

=== 2002 ===
- The Box of Life (Usama Muhammad)

=== 2003 ===
- A Flood in Baath Country (Omar Amiralay)
- Dreamy Visions (Waha al-Raheb)

=== 2005 ===
- Bab al-Makam (Mohamed Malas)
- Before Vanishing (Joude Gorani)
- 'Alaqat 'Aamah (Public Relations) (Samir Zikra)

=== 2008 ===
- Dolls - A Woman from Damascus (Diana El Jeiroudi)
- Hassiba (Raymond Boutros)

== 2010s ==
=== 2010 ===
- Damascus with Love (Mohamad Abdulaziz)
- September Rain (Abdullatif Abulhamid)
- Apricots (Amar Chebib)
- Damascus Roof and Tales of Paradise (Soudade Kaadan)

=== 2013 ===
- King of the Sands (Najdat Anzour)
- Ladder to Damascus (Mohammad Malas)
- The Return to Homs (Talal Derki)

=== 2014 ===
- Abandoned Mansions and Al Qaeda in Amusement Parks
- Aleppo. Notes from the Dark
- Baladna alraheeb
- The Cow Farm
- False Alarm
- From My Syrian Room
- Haunted
- Nediyari
- The Islamic State (documentary)
- Flames of War: The Fighting Has Just Begun
- Of God and Dogs
- Red Lines
- The Road to Aleppo
- Silvered Water, Syria Self-Portrait
- Suleima
- A Syrian Tale
- Trip Along Exodus
- Wajd: Music, Politics, & Ecstasy

=== 2016 ===
- Little Gandhi
- 9 Days – From My Window in Aleppo (Issa Touma)

=== 2017 ===
- Last Men in Aleppo (Feras Fayyad)
- Rain of Homs (Joud Said)

=== 2018 ===
- Greetings from Aleppo (Issa Touma)

=== 2019 ===
- The Cave (Feras Fayyad)
- For Sama (Waad al-Kataeb and Edward Watts)

== 2020s ==
=== 2021 ===
- Little Palestine: Diary of a Siege (Abdallah Al-Khatib)

=== 2026 ===
- Chronicles from the Siege (Abdallah Al-Khatib)

== See also ==
- Arab cinema
