= Agriculture in Syria =

Agriculture is a key part of the economy of Syria. The sector still accounts for an estimated 26 percent of gross domestic product (GDP) and represents a critical safety net for the 6.7 million Syrians – including those internally displaced – who still remain in rural areas. However, agriculture and the livelihoods that depend on it have suffered massive losses. Today, food production is at a record low and around half the population remaining in Syria are unable to meet their daily food needs.

Until the mid-1970s, agriculture in Syria was the primary economic activity in Syria. At independence in 1946, agriculture (including minor forestry and fishing) was the most important sector of the economy, and in the 1940s and early 1950s, agriculture was the fastest growing sector. Wealthy merchants from urban centers such as Aleppo invested in land development and irrigation. The rapid expansion of the cultivated area and increased output stimulated the rest of the economy. However, by the late 1950s, there was little land left that could easily be brought under cultivation. During the 1960s, agricultural output stagnated because of political instability and land reform. Between 1953 and 1976, agriculture's contribution to GDP increased (in constant prices) by only 3.2%, approximately the rate of population growth. From 1976 to 1984 growth in agriculture declined to 2% a year, and its importance in the economy declined as other sectors grew more rapidly.

In 1981, as in the 1970s, 53% of the population was still classified as rural, although movement to the cities continued to accelerate. However, in contrast to the 1970s, when 50% of the labor force was employed in agriculture, by 1983 agriculture employed only 30% of the labor force. Furthermore, by the mid-1980s, unprocessed farm products accounted for only 4% of exports, equivalent to 7% of non-petroleum exports. Industry, commerce, and transportation still depended on farm produce and related agro-business, but agriculture's preeminent position had clearly eroded. By 1985 agriculture (including a little forestry and fishing) contributed only 16.5% to GDP, down from 22.1% in 1976.

By the mid-1980s, the Syrian government had taken measures to revitalize agriculture. The 1985 investment budget saw a sharp rise in allocations for agriculture, including land reclamation and irrigation. The government's renewed commitment to agricultural development in the 1980s, by expanding cultivation and extending irrigation, promised brighter prospects for Syrian agriculture in the 1990s.

During the Syrian Civil War, the agricultural sector has witnessed a drop in producing all kinds of commodities such as wheat, cotton and olives, due to the lack of security and immigration of agricultural workforce, especially in Al-Hasakah Governorate and Aleppo Governorate.

== Water resources ==
Water is a scarce resource in Syria as it is throughout the Middle East, but Syria is more fortunate than many other countries. Sufficient rainfall supports cultivation in the Fertile Crescent - an arc from the southwest, near the border with Palestine and Lebanon, extending northward to the Turkish border and eastward along that border to Iraq. The other main area of cultivation is along the Euphrates and its major tributaries and is dependent on irrigation.

Rainfall is highest along the Mediterranean coast and on the mountains just inland, with Syria's limited forestry activities being concentrated in the higher elevations of these mountains. Rainfall diminishes sharply as one moves eastward of the mountains paralleling the coast and southward from the Turkish border. The arc of cultivation from the southwest (and east of the coastal mountains) to the northeast is largely semiarid, having as annual rainfall between 300 and 600 millimeters. Areas south and east of the arc receive less than 300 millimeters of rain annually, classifying the land as arid. Grass and coarse vegetation suitable for limited grazing grow in part of this arid belt, and the rest is desert of little agricultural value.

Rainfall is mainly between October and May. Without irrigation, cropping is finished by winter, when the climate is very hot and dry. Moreover, the amount of rainfall and its timing varies considerably from year to year, making rain-fed farming extremely risky. When rains are late or inadequate, farmers do not even plant a crop. Successive years of drought are not uncommon and cause havoc not only for farmers but for the rest of the economy. In the mid-1980s, about two-thirds of agricultural output (plant and animal production) depended on rainfall.

=== Irrigation ===
Extension and improvement of irrigation could substantially raise agricultural output. For example, in 1985, because of the expansion of irrigation, Syria's agricultural output rose 10% above the drought-plagued yield of 1984. Yields from irrigated fields have been several times higher than from rain-fed fields, and many irrigated areas could grow more than a single crop a year. Development of irrigation systems, however, is both costly and time-consuming.

Syria's major irrigation potential lies in the Euphrates River valley and its two major tributaries, the Balikh and Khabur rivers in the northeast portion of the country. The Euphrates is the largest river in Southwest Asia which originated in Turkey, where relatively heavy rain and snowfall provide runoff most of the year. The river flows southeastward across the arid Syrian Plateau into Iraq, where it joins the Tigris River shortly before emptying into the Persian Gulf. In addition to Syria, both Turkey and Iraq use dams on the Euphrates for hydroelectric power, water control, storage, and irrigation. In the mid-1980s, about a half of the annual Euphrates River flow was used by these three countries.

Syrians have long used the Euphrates for irrigation, but, because the major systems were destroyed centuries ago, they now make only limited use of the river's flow. In the mid-1980s, the Euphrates River accounted for over 85% of the country's surface water resources, but its water was used for only about two-fifths (200,000 hectares) of the land then under irrigated cultivation. In 1984, about 44% of irrigated land still used water from wells. Several project studies were conducted after World War II, and, in the 1960s, the Soviet Union agreed to provide financial and technical assistance for the Tabqa Dam, a large hydroelectric power station, and portions of the major Euphrates irrigation project.

The dam, located at Tabqa, a short distance upriver from the town of Raqqa, is earth fill, 60 meters high and four and a half kilometers long. Construction began in 1968, and work was essentially completed by 1978. The Rabqa Dam was closed in 1973, when Euphrates Lake, the artificial lake behind the dam, began filling. About 80 kilometers long, Euphrates Lake averages about 8 kilometers in width and holds nearly 12 billion cubic meters of water. The power plant has eight 100-megawatt turbines for power generation and transmission lines to Aleppo. Until 1983, the power station operated at 65% of capacity, generating 2,500 megawatts a year or about 45% of Syria's electricity. In 1986, the power station operated at only 30 to 40% of capacity because of the low water level in Euphrates Lake. Provisions were made, however, for future construction to raise the height of the dam, increase the capacity of Euphrates Lake by about 10%, and increase the number of turbines. In 1984, as a result of the disappointing performance of the dam, the government studied the possibility of building a second dam upstream from Tabqa between Ash Shajarah, situated on the northern edge of Euphrates Lake, and Jarabulus, located near the Turkish border. The ultimate goal of the Euphrates irrigation project is to provide 640,000 cultivable hectares by the year 2000, in effect doubling the area of Syria's irrigated land in the mid-1970s. In 1978, observers believed that 20,000 to 30,000 hectares of land had been irrigated and that new housing, roads, and farms had been completed for the 8,000 farmers displaced by the creation of Euphrates Lake. In the early 1980s, Syrian officials had anticipated the completion of irrigation on about 50,000 to 100,000 hectares in the Euphrates basin, with about 20,000 hectares planned for completion each year after that. The Fourth Five-Year Plan actually called for irrigating an additional 240,000 hectares by the end of the plan. In 1984, however, Syrian government statistics revealed that only 60,000 hectares were actually being irrigated. Ten years after its inception, the Euphrates irrigation project irrigated only about 10% of its long-term goal.

A variety of complex, interrelated problems frustrated realization of targeted irrigation goals. Technical problems with gypsum subsoil, which caused irrigation canals to collapse, proved more troublesome than at first anticipated. Large cost overruns on some of the irrigation projects made them much more expensive than planned and created difficulties in financing additional projects. Moreover, these large irrigation projects required several years before returns on the investments began. There was also doubt about whether farmers could be attracted back from urban areas or enticed from more crowded agricultural areas to the sparsely populated Euphrates Valley. Another complication is that the Euphrates flow is insufficient for the irrigation needs of the three countries—Turkey, Iraq, and Syria that share the river. In 1962, talks on allotment of Euphrates water began and continued sporadically throughout the 1970s and early 1980s, but acrimonious relations between Syria and Iraq hampered final agreements. In fact, in 1978 when Syria began filling Euphrates Lake and water to Iraq was greatly reduced, the two countries almost went to war. In addition, Turkey's use of Euphrates' waters for its Keban Dam assures that water levels in Euphrates Lake will remain low. This problem will undoubtedly continue into the 1990s, when Turkey completes construction of the Atatürk Dam.

By 1987, numerous Euphrates irrigation projects and additional irrigation projects throughout the country were proceeding, but what had been accomplished was not clear. Projects initiated in the 1980s included irrigation of 21,000 hectares in the Raqqa area pilot project, 27,000 hectares reclaimed in the Euphrates middle-stage project, and about half of a 21,000-hectare plot reclaimed with Soviet assistance in the Maskanah region. There were also major irrigation schemes involving 130,000 hectares in the Maskanah, Ghab valley, and Aleppo Plains project. In addition, Syria completed a small regulatory dam with three seventy-megawatt turbines approximately twenty- five kilometers downstream from Tabaqah. In the mid-1980s, work continued on the Mansoura Dam, located twenty-seven kilometers from the Euphrates dam, and the Tishrin Dam on the Kabir ash Shamali River near Latakia evolved from the planning to implementation stage. The government also planned to construct as many as three dams on the Khabur River in northeast Syria and more effectively use the waters of the Yarmuk River in southwest Syria. Foreign contractors carried out most of these major development projects. The Soviets and Romanians were particularly active in irrigation schemes as part of their economic aid programs. French, British, Italian, and Japanese firms, the World Bank, and Saudi Arabian and Kuwaiti development assistance funds were deeply involved in financing and implementing these projects.

In the 1980s, there was good potential for expanding and refining irrigation in the western portion of Syria. The government obtained economical results using small impoundments that held winter runoffs to supplement rain-fed cultivation and to provide some summer irrigation. Small storage areas for water from wells and springs permitted additional irrigation. Farmers, however, had not yet turned to sprinkler systems or trickle irrigation, which would considerably reduce the amount of water needed for cultivation.

=== Dams ===
According to Ahmed Kawan, Director of the Syrian General Authority for Water Resources, climate change and declining precipitation have severely impacted Syria's network of 164 dams, 161 of which are managed by the authority and hold a combined designed capacity of roughly 2.9 billion cubic meters, particularly in the country's southern governorates. Reservoir storage levels have fallen to critical thresholds nationwide, with near-total or complete depletion recorded in Daraa (0%), Raqqa (0%), Deir ez-Zor (0%), Damascus (1%), Idlib (2%), and Quneitra (4%), alongside substantial reductions in Hama (10%), Al-Hasakah (10%), Suwayda (13%), Homs (20%), Tartus (27%), Latakia (32%), and Aleppo (37%). Because the agricultural sector accounts for approximately 88 percent of Syria's total water consumption (compared to 9 percent for drinking water and 3 percent for industry and tourism) these acute reservoir deficits pose direct pressures on national food security.

== Land reform ==
Agriculture was Syria's main economic activity until mid 1970s. It was the most significant economic sector when Syria gained independence in 1946, experiencing the fastest growth during the 1940s and early 1950s. Syria's notables made large investments in irrigation and land development. The rest fields of the economy were accelerated by the rapid growth of the cultivated land and increased productivity. However, by the late 1950s, land reforms policy caused a drop in agricultural output. Agriculture's share of the GDP barely increased by 3.2% between 1953 and 1976. From 1976 through 1984, growth slowed to 2% annually. Thus, as other industries grew faster than agriculture, agriculture's significance to the economy decreased. In 1950 the first Syrian constitution placed a limit on the size of farm holdings, but the necessary implementing legislation was not passed until 1958, after the union of Syria and Egypt.

In 1959, the United Arab Republic was born, a hybrid new state that gathered Syria and Egypt under one national leader, Nasser. Although the union lasted only for three years, some of the measures that were undertaken had long-term effects on Syria, including agriculture. This is mainly because Syria’s environmental and social conditions were different from those in Egypt. Previously in Egypt, Nasser conducted land reforms based on the type of watering system. In this regard, the lands were divided in two categories according to irrigation type. When the two countries were united, Nasser applied in Syria the same policy he installed previously in Egypt. However, many studies have demonstrated that this division was short-sighted and ineffective in Syria as it led to impoverishing the farmers and demolishing Syrian farming eventually.

Pre-1958:

Farming land was not distributed, it was rather earned, bought, or claimed by inheritance law. A small percentage of the rural population possessed most of the farming land while the majority of the locals were farmers. About 70% of the countryside population did not own any land, and they earned their living through wage labor or sharecropping. Furthermore, 10-15% of the population in the country owned limited properties of less than 10 hectares. Big estates owned by only 2.5% of all landowners controlled almost 40% of all agricultural land.

1958–1961

After Syria formed the United Arab Republic with Egypt in 1958, land reforms were installed in Syria following the same pattern of those in Egypt. Personal possession of land was limited to 80 hectares of irrigated land and 300 hectares of non-irrigated land. The rest of the personal properties were expropriated by the state. the owners were set to compensation plans that spanned 75 years. However, the original owners were not compensated fully. contrastingly, the farmers received a maximum of 8 hectares of irrigated or 30 of non-irrigated land per person.

1963–1966

The Baath Military Coup installed a harsher limit on landownership with a maximum of 15 to 55 hectares per individual for irrigated land and between 80 and 200 hectares per individual for non-irrigated land. This limit was based on the fertility of land itself. The speed at which the expropriation of land occurred increased so that almost one million hectares were eventually expropriated and 240.000 hectares had been redistributed in a span of a year and a half.

1966–1970

With another military coup in 1966, the land expropriated from large landowners were no longer redistributed. Instead, the lands became state-owned properties where farmers work and do not have rights to ownership. In addition, the state decided the kinds of the crops to be planted, handling, and marketing of the products. Particularly growing cotton and wheat.

1970–2000

In 1970, Hafiz al-Asad came to power while the agrarian sector was stagnating. The pursuit of a state capitalist economy forced the original land owners to leave the country or to be marginalized. Instead of the private capital, the state had to invest in farming heavily. However, the government failed to fill the gap left by the original landlords. As a result, Hafiz al-Assad invited investors back to Syria. The landlords were encouraged to start investing again in the state-owned landholdings, while the state dealt with the local farmers who had small-holdings. The land reforms strategy of Nasser was finalized in the 1970s. The former large estates were reduced in size, while the number of small-holdings increased, depopulating the countryside effectively as farmers were not supported anymore by the government and they were not able to sustain continuous cropping. As a result, farmers families started leaving the countryside and migrating to the outskirts of large cities like Damascus and Aleppo. The catastrophic effects of land reforms policy on agriculture in Syria were quite noticed by the 1990s. Producing of the strategic crops was heavily subsidized. However, the government decided to reduce the subsidies for seeds, chemical fertilizer, and pesticides. In addition, heavy agrarian equipment were not subsidized, which minimized the local farming and impoverished the local farmers.

The remaining farmers became completely dependent on governmental support, which manifested in loans, as well as seeds and fertilizers support. However, farming and crops output was degrading with time. The degradation of the effective agricultural sector in Syria, including productivity and capacity would be attributed to the national land reforms of 1958, maintained by the Assad regime but seldom meticulously planned economically and financially speaking.

== Cropping and production ==
Commodity	Production in Tonnes (2013)
Irrigated wheat	2,186,788
Cow milk	1,527,993
Citrus fruits	1,250,725
Rainfed wheat	995,323
Olive oil	842,098
Rainfed barley	815,981
Sheep milk	684,578
Potatoes	441,718
Sugar beet	316,855
Grapes	306,736
Tomatoes	273,009
Apple	256,614
Cotton	169,094
Sheep meat	163,874
Goat milk	144,371
Lentil	129,370
Yellow maize	109,145
Chicken meat	107,519
Irrigated barley	94,939
Almonds	83,229
Apricot	65,272
Cherry	62,373
Pistachio	54,516
Chickpea	53,022
Fig	46,443
Beans	30,990
Tobacco	15,817
Goat meat	13,744
Fish	7,465
Palm	4,039
Honey	2,896
Wax	166

Because only about 16% of the cropped area was irrigated, the output of agriculture (both plant and animal) was heavily dependent on rainfall. The great variation in the amounts and timing of rainfall can immediately cause very substantial shifts in areas planted, yields, and production, but the effect on livestock is less predictable. When drought is unusually severe or prolonged, loss of animals may depress livestock production for several years. In 1984 crop production accounted for 72 percent of the value of agricultural output; livestock and animal products, 28 percent. Livestock alone, not counting products such as milk, wool, and eggs, were 11 percent of the total.

In 1984, crop production amounted to LS 13.6 billion. The United States Department of Agriculture (USDA) valued Syrian 1985 production at US$1.1 billion. Grains contributed 15 percent to the value of total crop production in 1984, in contrast to 41 percent in 1974. Industrial crops remained 20 percent of the total. Fruits rose from 15 to 25 percent of the total, and vegetables rose from 16 to 35 percent. In 1984, grain continued to be planted on 66 percent of the cultivated land, consistent with the mid-1970s percentage.

Fluctuations in rainfall resulted in major variations in crop production throughout the 1980s. In 1980, wheat was planted on 1.4 million hectares, yielding 2.2 million tons—the largest wheat harvest since the early 1960s. In 1984, wheat planted on 1.1 million hectares produced only 1.1 million tons. In 1980 and 1984, barley was planted on 1.2 million hectares, but production fell from 1.6 million tons in 1980, the peak year, to 303,500 tons in 1984, revealing the impact of the drought on rain-dependent crops. In 1985 wheat and barley crops rebounded to 1.7 million tons and 740,000 tons, respectively. In 1984, Syria grew a record 60,000 tons of corn.

Earlier stagnation of agricultural output meant primarily stagnation of grain production. Instead of exporting wheat, in the 1980s Syria became a net importer. In 1985, Syria imported 1.4 million tons of wheat, worth more than LS 800 million. In addition, cereal imports rose from LS 368 million in 1982 to LS 1.6 billion in 1984, amounting to 56 percent of the LS 2.85 billion bill for food imports that year.

During the 1970s and 1980s, the government encouraged greater grain production by providing improved high-yield seeds, raising prices paid to farmers, and urging shifts toward wheat growing on some irrigated land formerly planted in cotton. Its intent was to raise grain output at least to self-sufficiency to ease the pressure on the balance of payments. Beginning in the late 1970s, the government showed increased interest in improving rain-fed agriculture and acquired funding from the World Bank, International Fund for Agricultural Development, and the UN Development Program for a US$76.3 million project to expand food production and raise the standard of living in Daraa and As Suwayda provinces. In addition, Syrian agriculture benefited from research projects undertaken by the International Center for Agricultural Research in the Dry Areas' (ICARDA) branch office located near Aleppo. ICARDA helped develop the Sham-1 durum wheat and Sham-2 bread wheat used by Syrian farmers in the mid-1980s and demonstrated through its research the positive effect of phosphate fertilizers on barley crops in dry areas, encouraging the government to consider a change in agricultural strategy.

In the 1980s, vegetables and fruits exhibited the fastest growth rates of the various crops, although they started from a low base. Urbanization and rising incomes spurred cultivation of these products, which were also generally exempt from official price control. Fruits and vegetables were grown primarily in the northwest and coastal plain in irrigated fields and where rainfall and groundwater were greatest. However, Syria lagged considerably behind Lebanon in cultivation of fruits and vegetables in similar terrain, and seasonal fruits were consistently smuggled in from Lebanon in the 1980s.

During the Syrian Civil War, the country lost $16 billion of crop and livestock production, in which household livestock ownership has sunk at nearly 50% for each of cattle, sheep, goats and poultry.

=== Cotton ===
Cotton production in comparison with wheat, barley and olive oil production in 1000 metric tonnes since 2010.

Syria has produced cotton since ancient times, and its cultivation increased in importance in the 1950s and 1960s. Until superseded by petroleum in 1974, cotton was Syria's most important industrial and cash crop, and the country's most important foreign exchange earner, accounting for about one-third of Syria's export earnings. In 1976, the country was the tenth largest cotton producer in the world and the fourth largest exporter. Almost all the cotton was grown on irrigated land, largely in the area northeast of Aleppo. Syrian cotton was medium staple, similar to cotton produced in other developing countries but of lower quality than the extra-long staple variety produced in Egypt. The cotton was handpicked, although mechanical pickers were tried in the 1970s in an attempt to hold down rising labor costs.

Cotton production (cotton lint) rose from 13,000 tons in 1949 to 180,000 tons in 1965. However, land reform and nationalization of the cotton gins precipitated a sharp decline in output in the next few years. Beginning in 1968 and during the 1970s annual lint production hovered around 150,000 tons. However, in 1983 and 1984, Syria enjoyed a record cotton crop of 523,418 tons, and the third highest yield in the world, estimated at 3 tons per hectare. To a large measure, this increase was attributable to the government's raising cotton procurement prices by 44 percent in 1981–82, and by another 20 percent in 1982–83.

Although the area under cotton cultivation has declined since the early 1960s, yields have increased as a result of improved varieties of seed and increasing amounts of fertilizer. The area planted dropped from over 250,000 hectares in the early 1960s to 140,000 hectares in 1980. In response to the jump in procurement prices by 1984, it increased to 178,000 hectares. As domestic consumption of cotton increased in the 1960s and 1970s, the government built several textile mills to gain the value added from exports of fabrics and clothes compared with exports of raw cotton. In the 1980s, cotton exports averaged 120,000 tons, ranging from a low of 72,800 tons to a record of 151,000 tons in 1983. Syria's seed cotton harvest was 462,000 tons in 1985, about 3 percent higher than in 1984. Approximately 110,000 tons of the 1985 harvest were destined for export markets. Major foreign customers in 1985 included the Soviet Union (18,000 tons), Algeria (14,672 tons), Italy (13,813 tons), and Spain (10,655 tons).

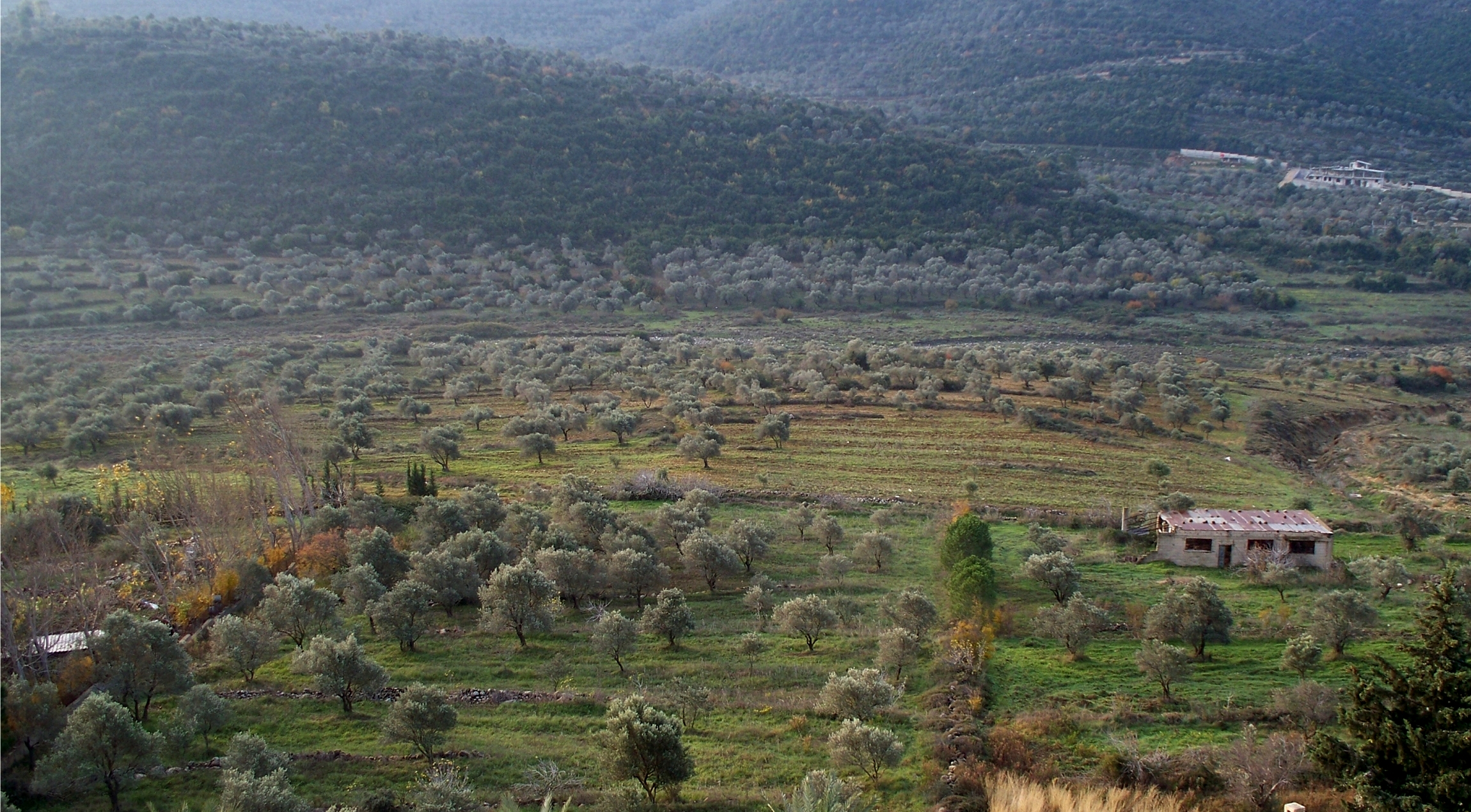
Olive groves in Western-Syria, Homs Governorate.

The government's goal of expanding and diversifying food production created intense competition for irrigated land and encouraged the practice of double cropping. Because cotton did not lend itself to double cropping, the cultivated cotton area was declining in real terms. However, the area under cultivation and significance of other industrial crops substantially increased during the 1980s. For example, the government initiated policies designed to stimulate sugar beet cultivation to supply the sugar factories built in the 1970s and 1980s. The area under cultivation for sugar beets rose from 22,000 hectares in 1980 to 35,700 hectares in 1984, with sugar beet harvests totaling over 1 million tons in 1984. Syria, however, still imported LS 287 million worth of sugar in 1984. USDA estimated that Syria would achieve tobacco self-sufficiency in 1985, with harvests of 12.3 million tons (dry weight) compared with 12.2 million tons in 1984. Although yields per hectare fell slightly in 1985, USDA expected imports to match exports. In 1984, Syria imported 559 tons of tobacco and exported 225 tons. Other important commercial crops included olives and tomatoes.

== See also ==
- 2025 hunger crisis in Syria
