= Seurat (surname) =

Seurat is a surname. Notable people with the surname include:

- Georges Seurat (1859–1891), French painter
- Léon Gaston Seurat (1872–?), French zoologist and parasitologist
- Marie Seurat (born 1949), Syrian novelist
- Michel Seurat (1947–1986), French sociologist and researcher
- Pilar Seurat (1938–2001), Filipina-American actress
