= Mumbaqat =

Archaeological type site

- Tall Munbāqa, Ekalte
- Location within Syria
- 36°13′8.97″N 38°7′53.89″E
- Type: Tell
- Location: Raqqa Governorate, Syria

Site notes
- Excavation dates: 1969-1993, 1999-2010
- Archaeologists: Ernst Heinrich, Winfried Orthmann, Alfred Werner Maurer, Dittmar Machule
- Condition: Ruins
- Public access: Yes

Tall Munbāqa or Mumbaqat or Tell Munbaqa, proposed as the site of the Late Bronze Age city of Ekalte, is a 5,000-year-old town complex in Raqqa Governorate of northern Syria. The ruins are located on a steep slope on the east bank of the upper course of the Euphrates. Due to the establishment of the Tabqa Dam at Al-Thawrah, 35 kilometers west of Raqqa, the city ruins are partially flooded today by Lake Assad. Situated high above the steep drop of the eastern shore, the high mound of Tall Munbāqa is still preserved. Several other sites are in the vicinity including Emar about 100 kilometers to the south, Tell Hadidi about 5 kilometers to the north, and Habuba Kabira about 10 kilometers to the south. The city-god of Ekalte was Baʿlaka (Bakhlaka). There are known to have been four temples in the city, three on the high ground by the Euphrates and one at a city gate.

== History ==
The site was occupied, in a limited area between the main mound and the Euphrates river, in the Early Dynastic IV period (Akkadian Empire period). The settlement included a citadel-like structure, temples and a defense wall. The dating was established by an inscription of Akkadian Empire ruler Šar-kali-šarri on a bronze vessel. While there are no archaeological remains from that time it has been suggested that in the Old Babylonian period the site was named Yakaltum or Ekallatum, based mainly on the similarity of names. Yakaltum was an obscure town still unlocated but known to be near Mari. Ekallatum, also unlocated, was the original capital of the Amorite ruler Shamshi-Adad I. This correspondence has been challenged.

=== Middle and Late Bronze ===
Beginning in the Middle Bronze and to its maximum extent in the Late Bronze period the site expanded in size. The main new settlement areas were termed "Innenstadt", "Ibrahim’s Garten", and "Aussenstadt" by the excavators. The Late Bronze occupation (Late Bronze Age phase 4 which is separated from phase 3 by another destruction layer) is sealed by a destruction layer and the site is abandoned afterward. The date of destruction is uncertain and there are several proposals:

- c. 1530-1446 BC during the campaign of Egyptian Pharaoh Tuthmosis III in the area
- c. 1400-1325 BC during the campaign of Šuppiluliuma I in the area
- c. 1340-1265 BC during the siege of Emar by Hurrian forces

== Archaeology ==
In 1907, the English explorers William M. Ramsay and Gertrude Bell discovered the ruins, drew up a plan and described the ramparts: "Munbayah where my tents were pitched - the Arabic name means only a high-altitude course - was probably the Bersiba in Ptolemy's list of city names. It consists of a double ramparts, situated on the river bank." Though Bell was wrong in the localization of Bersiba, she did recognize the importance of the mound for the study of the oriental city.

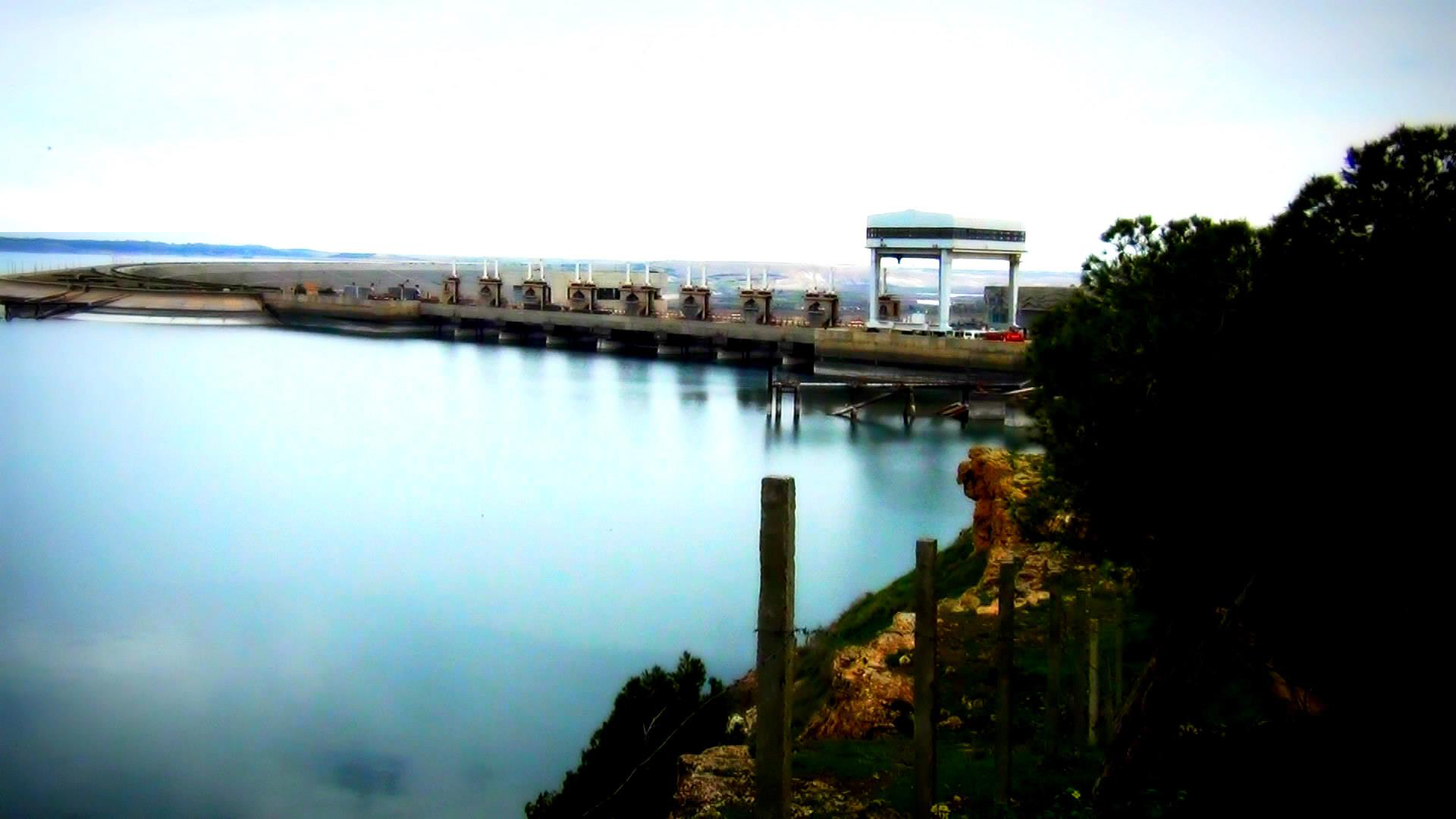
Euphrates Dam

The 400 meter by 500 meter, rectangular town ruins, once strongly fortified, were documented and investigated in 1964 during a Syrian Antiquity Administration regional survey on the occasion of the inspection of the area for a proposed reservoir due to construction of the Euphrates Dam. The German Oriental Society requested an excavation permit for the mound in 1968. In 1969–1970, Ernst Heinrich of Technische Universität Berlin measured the visible remains and in 1971 the excavation of these remains were carried out. In 1973 and 1974, excavations were led by Winfried Orthmann and in 1977 by Alfred Werner Maurer, both of the University of Saarbrücken.

From 1979 on Dittmar Machule of the Technical University of Hamburg-Harburg was the director. During the excavations in 1973, 1974 and 1977 up to 16 scientists and 90 local workers were involved in the excavations. Thanks to the discovery of 15 Late Bronze Age clay tablets mentioning the name of the city, it is now believed that it was known in this period as Ekalte. A geophysical survey was also conducted.

Excavation was resumed in 1999 and continued in six seasons (1999, 2004, 2005, 2006, 2008, and 2010) until 2010 under Machule and Felix Blocher. Work focused on the top of the mound, the Inner City, and the North Gate area.

Finds included bronze objects, in a Late Bronze context, which have been speculated to be drill bits or stunning bolts for hunting fowl. A sizable hoard of hacksilver was found in a Late Bronze period building floor.

About 96 cuneiform tablets in total were excavated from the site and a few more have appeared via the antiquities market. They are primarily financial in nature including sales of property. The tablets from this site show no Hittite or Luwian influences, such as personal names, dating them before Hittite influence grew in the area. A few Hurrian personal names are noted. Transactions include a (TM 23) a woman being sold for 1000 head of small cattle and (TM 72) the purchase of 140 asses from Sutean tribesmen. Tablets were dated using a local eponym system based on the name of current mayor. Two or three kings are mentioned in the tablets including Ba'alkabar (IŠKUR-kabar), who may or may not be the one who ruled Emar, and Yaḫṣi-Ba‛la. Zū-Ba‛la, the son of Yaḫṣi-Ba‛la, is mentioned in text but it is uncertain if he became a ruler. One mayor, Ba‛la-malik, is known to have been a son of Ba'alkabar.

The objects excavated from the site were held mainly in the National Museum of Syria in Raqqa with some remains onsite at the mission house. Both of those locations were looted out in the chaos that engulfed Syria since excavations ended. The site itself has been extensively looted, especially in the northern temple area and the southwest residential area. A large number of stones have been stolen for use in modern construction.

== See also ==
- Cities of the ancient Near East
- List of Mesopotamian deities
- List of Mesopotamian dynasties
