= Film Essay on the Euphrates Dam =

Film Essay on the Euphrates Dam فيلم محاولة عن سد الفرات
- Directed by: Omar Amiralay
- Cinematography: Hazem Bayaa
- Edited by: Ziad Ma'adani, Rifa'at Moghrabi
- Production company: Syrian Arab Television
- Release date: 1970
- Running time: 13 minutes
- Country: Syria
- Language: Arabic

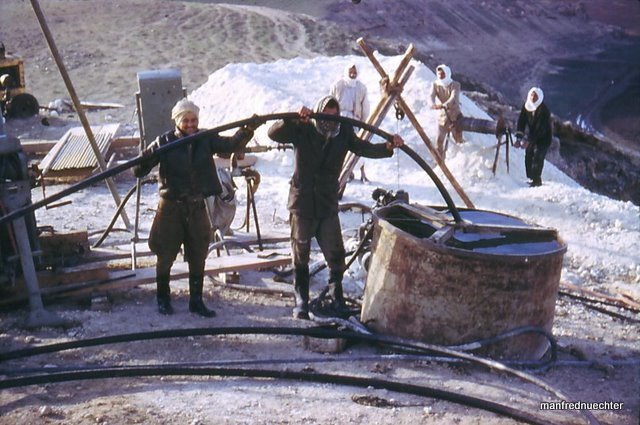
Construction on the Tabqa Dam in 1961

Film Essay on the Euphrates Dam (Arabic: فيلم محاولة عن سد الفرات, romanized: fīlm muḥāwala ʿan sudd al-Furāti) is the first film by Syrian documentary filmmaker Omar Amiralay. The documentary depicts the construction of the Tabqa Dam on the Euphrates. Amiralay made the film out of "sincere admiration for Ba'ath-led modernization", a position he would later reverse.

Film Essay on the Euphrates Dam was commissioned by the Syrian Arab Television and Radio Broadcasting Commission and the Ministry of Information. The film presents footage of young male laborers, machinery and construction scaffolding (in imitation of Soviet filmmaker Dziga Vertov, whom Amiralay admired), shots of the still water and boats moving across it, and footage of Bedouins living nearby to the construction site of the Tabqa Dam in the months before their evacuation from the region that would become the dam's reservoir, Euphrates Lake. Meghan Claire Considine characterizes this footage as being "through the lens of salvage ethnography", juxtaposing the rural Bedouins with the dam's construction to imply that the dam project would bring about the end of their riverine culture. A montage in the film juxtaposes the industrial machinery of the dam's construction with shots of a limestone statue of the ancient Mesopotamian goddess Ishtar, dated to the eighteenth century BCE and excavated near the Euphrates from Mari. Extended shots of dry and cracked feet are montaged with shots of mudcracks in the dry desert ground; Considine says that this "communicat[es] well-trodden logics linking indigeneity and the land".

R. Shareah Taleghani describes Film Essay on the Euphrates Dam as "a wholesale celebration of the life-changing potential of the state's early modernization and development projects". The film was welcomed upon release by the Syrian National Film Organization. Film Essay on the Euphrates Dam is the first installment in Amiralay's trilogy of films about the Tabqa Dam on the Euphrates, followed by his second film, Everyday Life in a Syrian Village (1974) and his final film, A Flood in Baath Country (2003). Everyday Life in a Syrian Village was banned in Syria, as most of Amiralay's films would be, for its implicit criticism of the failures of the state. In A Flood in Baath Country, Amiralay repurposed footage from Film Essay on the Euphrates Dam as self-critique for his "naive" initial enthusiasm about the Ba'ath party, for which he felt deep shame in the aftermath of three decades of Ba'ath rule in Syria.
