= Tell Hadidi =

Archaeological site in northern Syria

- Azu
- Location within Syria
- 36°15′53″N 38°09′02″E
- Type: settlement
- Periods: Bronze Age, Roman
- Cultures: Mitanni
- Location: Syria

History
- Built: c. 2300 BC

Site notes
- Excavation dates: 1973 to 1977
- Archaeologists: Henk Franken, Rudolph H. Dornemann
- Condition: Ruined
- Owner: Public
- Public access: Yes

Tell Hadidi (ancient Azu) is an ancient Near East archaeological site in Syria about 30 kilometers north of Emar and 5 kilometers north of Ekalte. It is not to be confused with another Azu which is curretnly unlocated but known to be near Ebla.

It lies on the west bank of the Euphrates River on the opposite bank from Tell es-Sweyhat. It is thought to be a paired city with Tell es-Sweyhat controlling a Euphrates river crossing. There are prominent hollow ways between the site and Tell es-Sweyhat, Tell Othman, and Tell Jouweif. The site was occupied from the Early Bronze Age period to the Late Bronze Age and again to a lesser extent in Roman times. It was one of several rescue excavations sparked by the construction of the Tabqa Dam and the resulting Lake Assad. The town's primary god was Dagan.

== History ==
Beveled rim bowls were found at the site. These are diagnostic pottery of the Uruk period though it has been suggested that in rare cases use continued into the Early Dynastic I period.

=== Early Bronze ===
The site was first occupied at the beginning of the Early Bronze Age EB I (circa 3300 BC) about the Uruk Period. There are nine EB I architectural levels. The city developed to its maximum extent of about 135 hectares in the later part of the Early Bronze Age EB III (circa 2300 BC) and was destroyed around 2000 BC.

=== Late Bronze ===
In the Late Bronze, this region came under the Mitanni Empire. Around 1345 BC, the Mitanni Empire collapsed and the region came under the Hittites. Towards the end of the Late Bronze the Assyrians competed with the Hittites.

==== Mitanni period ====
Occupation continued, on a much reduced scale and only on the upper tell, into the Late Bronze Age (IA and IB), ending circa 1200 BC. For a time in the Late Bronze Age, circa 1500 BC, the city was under the control of the Mitanni Empire. It may have also been under the control of the Hittite Empire at one point.

=== Late periods ===
There are also significant Roman Empire remains, circa 1st to 3rd century, and some Islamic remains, circa 12th to 14th century.

== Archaeology ==
The site of Tell Hadidi has an extent of around 135 hectares. It has an upper and lower tell. The upper tell, lying to the west and with an area of around 55 hectares, has Middle Bronze Age remains on the surface with Early Bronze Age underneath. The lower tell, lying to the east, is primarily Early Bronze Age, in the late 3rd Millennium BC, and was at least partially protected by a fortification wall at that time. Looted out shaft-and-chamber graves from this period were found there. Some remains from the Late Bronze Age were also found there including an undisturbed tomb. It was 12 meters long and contained 6 chambers.

Tell Hadidi was visited by Abdul Rihaoui in 1963 and Maurits van Loon in 1964 as part of preparation for the dam rescue efforts.

The site was excavated in between 1973 and 1977. In 1972–74 Tell Hadidi was worked by Henk Franken for Leiden University of the Netherlands. From 1974 to 1977 Rudolph H. Dornemann excavated there under the auspices of the Milwaukee Public Museum. Some of those excavation reports are still unpublished. Along with a few cuneiform tablets a number of small finds were recovered including about 200 Early Bronze clay figurines, an inscribed stone plaque, and a toy chariot front.

=== Cuneiform tablets ===
The most significant element discovered was a 15th century BC (Late Bronze Age) building ("Tablet Building" in Area H, Stratum 6) that was violently destroyed by fire. In it were found a few cuneiform tablets. Along with them were a number of large storage jars, vats, cups, jars, and cooking pots. The tablets identified the building as the residence of "Yaya, son of Huziru, son of Dagan" and the cities name as Azu (otherwise known only from records of the city of Alalakh). There were eleven complete cuneiform tablets (eight found in a jar), three almost complete tablets, and three tablet fragments. They are held in the National Museum of Aleppo in Syria.

The Tell Hadidi text are primarily of a legal nature and include five sale documents, three administrative lists of names, two legal documents, a letter, and a will (Had-9) of Yaya the owner of the home. Four of the individuals listed in the tablets are also known from tablets recovered at Ekalte. The most common divine name used is that of Dagan, followed by various forms of the Storm God including Tessup the Hurrian version. The tablets have not been formally published but Robert Whiting of the Oriental Institute of Chicago made preliminary transcriptions and translations available online. One tablet (Had-8), an official Mitanni letter order, is significant because it set a chronology synchronism between Azu, Ekalte, and Emar.

Since the end of excavations the site has been subject to looting with hand tools, especially on the southeastern side. There is also illegal cultivation of barley occurring.

== See also ==
- Cities of the ancient Near East
- Jebel Aruda
- List of Mesopotamian deities
- List of Mesopotamian dynasties
