= A Flood in Baath Country =

2003 Syrian anti-Baathist documentary

A Flood in Baath Country طوفان في بلاد البعث Déluge au Pays du Baas
- Original French release poster
- Directed by: Omar Amiralay
- Narrated by: Omar Amiralay
- Cinematography: Meyar al-Roumi, Siwar Zirkli, Khalil Salloum
- Edited by: Chantal Piquet, Fabio Balducci
- Production companies: ARTE France; AMI'P
- Distributed by: Doc & Co; Arab Film Distribution
- Release date: 2003
- Running time: 47 minutes
- Countries: Syria, France
- Language: Arabic with French subtitles

A Flood in Baath Country (Note: Released in France as Déluge au pays du Baas) (Arabic: طوفان في بلاد البعث, romanized: Ṭoufān fi Balad al-Bʿṯ) is a Syrian documentary film by the director Omar Amiralay, released in 2003 and premiered in 2004 at the Beirut Cinema Days Festival. The film, Amiralay's last, criticizes the Ba'athist regime in Syria, particularly the Tabqa Dam construction project and the party's impact on political life and education in the country. In A Flood in Baath Country, Amiralay repurposes footage from his first film to criticize his initial enthusiasm for the Ba'ath Party. Footage for the documentary was shot in the Syrian village of al-Mashi and on Lake Assad. Though banned in Syria like most of Amiralay's films, A Flood in Baath Country was readily available domestically on pirate DVD. After a satellite broadcast of the film was seen by Syrian viewers in 2006, Amiralay was arrested and restricted from leaving the country. A Flood in Baath Country has been acclaimed by critics and scholars of film, and won the award for the best short film at the 2004 Biennale des films arabes in Paris.

== Background and production ==
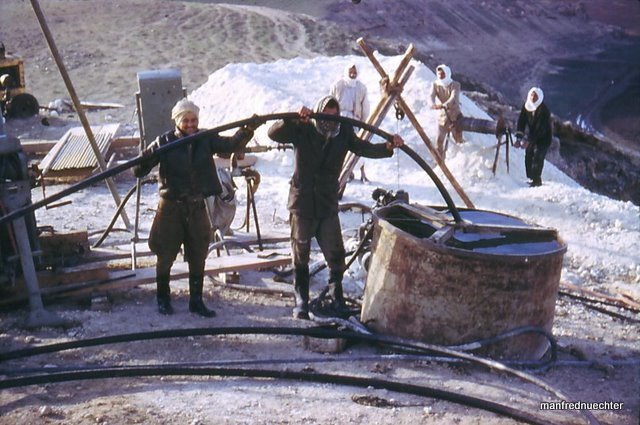
The construction of the Tabqa Dam led to the submerging of villages under Lake Assad

In his first film, Film Essay on the Euphrates Dam (1970), Omar Amiralay had supportively documented the Ba'ath Party's construction of the Tabqa Dam on the Euphrates. In the river's damming, Lake Assad was formed as the dam's reservoir, flooding archaeologically important villages and displacing their inhabitants. New settlements around the reservoir were constructed for the displaced villagers. Over thirty years of Ba'ath rule later, A Flood in Baath Country criticizes the regime and the dam. For the film, Amiralay visited Busha'ban tribespeople who were displaced by the dam's construction, and repurposed footage from Film Essay on the Euphrates Dam to criticize his initial enthusiasm for the party, for which he felt shame. As Neil MacFarquhar reports, Amiralay wanted to "atone" and to "expose government propaganda for what it is". In a 2008 interview, Amiralay explained revisiting Film Essay on the Euphrates Dam in A Flood in Baath Country as an act of self-criticism to initiate his criticism of the Ba'ath regime, saying "integrity requires that I include myself in the criticism." Amiralay's 1974 film Everyday Life in a Syrian Village is sometimes named with Film Essay and A Flood as constituting a "trilogy" of documentaries by Amiralay centered on the Tabqa Dam.

When doing research for A Flood in Baath Country, Amiralay came to believe that the dam was not constructed to generate power, but to protect the regime from the possibility that Turkey would restrict Syria's water supply. He was also particularly incensed to learn that the site submerged by Lake Assad was "the place where human beings became farmers for the first time, and left the hunting-and-gathering stage, eleven thousand years before Christ." Amiralay was inspired to make the film after witnessing the overthrow of Saddam Hussein in Iraq, saying: "When you see one of the two Ba'ath parties broken, collapsing, you can only hope that it will be the turn of the Syrian Ba'ath next". The film's working title was Fifteen reasons why I hate the Baath Party.

=== Writing and production ===
Speaking to Lawrence Wright, Amiralay described the film's working concept: "I wanted to make a film of fifteen shots, which are the fifteen reasons I hate the Ba'ath Party. The last reason was that I hate myself, for having been obliged to make a film for them. They spoiled forty years of my life." In a 2022 interview, Mohamad al-Roumi, who assisted in the film's production, said that the script he received from Amiralay was named Twelve Reasons Why Omar Hates the Baath Party. According to al-Roumi, "those 12 reasons [...] had evolved into 20 or 25" by the time he saw the final film.

Amiralay was pondering producing the film with the General Film Organization, but Syrian director and photographer Mohamad al-Roumi encouraged him to make it himself, and offered all of his own equipment for Amiralay to use. Al-Roumi also helped Amiralay to film in the region despite not having the necessary approvals. Amiralay continued shooting without al-Roumi when the latter traveled to France. Al-Roumi notes that many of the film's subjects believed that the documentary was being made for "an official institution", which led them to "exaggerate their glorification of the Ba'ath Party and the leader" in their interviews. Amiralay discussed his presentation of the documentary project to the film's eventual subjects in an interview: "When I entered the village, I never said I was coming from Syrian television, nor that I was making a propaganda film about Syria, the Ba'ath, or the Syrian regime. I said that I was making a film about Syria today—or rather, from prehistory up to today. That's how I introduced the film." Amiralay also said that intelligence agents were sometimes present during his visits with Shaykh Diab al-Mashi, who would "sometimes wink at [him] and say, 'Be quiet, that's enough.'" Amiralay also said that he found the village of al-Mashi, where the documentary was filmed, "quite by chance" during his field work, and decided to base his documentary there as a "microcosm of Syria".

== Content ==
Footage is shot in and around the village of al-Mashi, situated in Raqqa Governorate between Manbij and the Euphrates and named after a prominent local family. The documentary depicts extreme poverty in Syria and the Ba'ath Party's full control of the country's political life. At the beginning of A Flood in Baath Country Amiralay speaks over footage from Film Essay on the Euphrates Dam about his remorse at having made it; about a report that all the early Ba'ath-constructed dams were at risk of collapsing like the Zeyzoun had in 2002; and of the dam's reservoir, Lake Assad, as a symbol for the regime, "submerg[ing] all life in Syria". Amiralay interviews two members of the al-Mashi family: Shaykh Diab al-Mashi, a former leader of the Busha'ban tribe and the longest-serving member of parliament in Syria, and his nephew Khalaf, a local Ba'ath official and the principal of the village's elementary school.

Diab discusses his loyalty to President Hafez al-Assad, who rewarded him with a permanent seat in the Syrian Parliament for sending his tribesmen to fight the Muslim Brotherhood during the Islamist uprising in the 1970s.

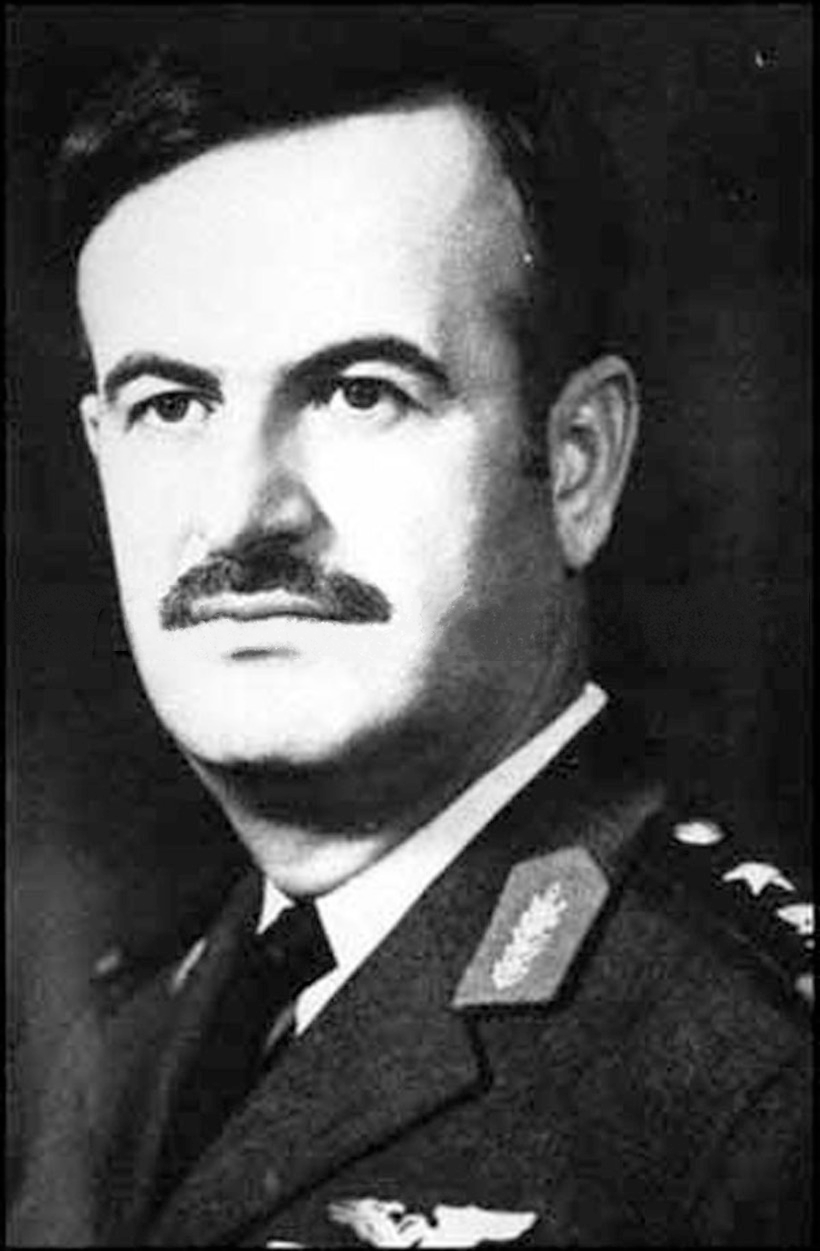
Hafez al-Assad shortly after the 1970 coup

In footage from the elementary school, children mouth and chant Ba'ath slogans in praise of the president by rote, such as "We are the voice of the proletariat. In sacrifice, we eat little." They also read from a Ba'athist textbook praising the Tabqa Dam's construction, reading: "On the fifth of July, the Euphrates River joined a new school to learn how to read and write and to fall in love with the fields and the trees in a modern way. At the school's door, President Hafez al-Assad removed the river's muddy cloak, trimmed his unkempt hair, cut his long nails and gave him a green-ink pen and a notebook to write his diaries as a civilized river."

The film ends with a monologue from an elderly fisherman on a boat floating on Lake Assad. He says that children don't know that the Euphrates used to be different, saying that "they think this lake has been here forever." At one point, he points to a parcel of water and says that his drowned village is there.

=== Cinematography and style ===
The film employs long shots and close-ups, in contrast to the "unusual cinematic punctuations" including freeze-frames, repeated motifs, and distorted angles used in Amiralay's earlier Everyday Life in a Syrian Village (1974). French film critic Thérèse-Marie Deffontaines described the film as employing "formal rigor" in its use of "long, very cinematic frontal shots". According to Enab Baladi, the film's slow and silent shots reflect the stagnation and monotony of life in the villages around the reservoir. Chantal Berman describes the "oft-repeated signature shot" of the film as an "excruciatingly slow" passage through a doorway, which she finds claustrophobic in imitation of "circumscribed political vision". Nathalie Khankan writes of the film's cinematography: "Amiralay's camera is patient, frames are carefully composed, the view is quietly panoramic."

== Reception and censorship ==
The film was released in 2003 and had its premiere in 2004 at the Beirut Cinema Days Festival. It also played at the 2004 Biennale des films arabes in Paris, where it won the award for best short film. The jury of the 2005 Munich DOK.FEST's Horizons Award gave the film a special mention.

=== Cancelled Carthage showing ===
Following reported political pressure, the 2004 Carthage Film Festival in Tunisia cancelled plans to screen A Flood in Baath Country. 53 film directors criticized the decision in an open letter to the festival's director Nadia Attia. A number of filmmakers withdrew their submissions to the festival in protest, including Danielle Arbid, Joana Hadjithomas, Nizar Hassan, Annemarie Jacir, Khalil Joreige, and Yousry Nasrallah. Enab Baladi reported that the Ba'athist regime had directly requested that the Tunisian government prevent the screening. In response to the backlash, Attia relented and re-admitted the film to be shown a single time, outside of official competition and on the final day of the festival. Jeune Afrique reported that the news of the screening's cancellation had just been an unfounded rumor, and that the Festival had kept its promise to not engage in censorship. A Flood in Baath Country had its North American premiere at the 2005 Tribeca Festival, where it was shown alongside Film Essay on the Euphrates Dam.

=== Censorship and arrest in Syria ===
A Flood in Baath Country was banned from release in Syria, but Amiralay released the documentary to film pirates and said that within the next two months, everyone in Damascus had seen the film. "It was a digital flood." he said. American journalist James Bennett wrote in 2005 that he had seen the film on DVD despite the censorship "like everyone else [in Syria]". In an interview with Bennett, Amiralay said that an Arab satellite network had bought the rights to broadcast the film. The broadcast would be viewable in Syria since satellite television had recently been legalized in Syria by President Bashar al-Assad. Amiralay requested that the network include in their broadcast a dedication to his friend Samir Kassir—a Lebanese journalist who had been critical of the Ba'athist regime before being killed by a car bomb in 2005—implicitly accusing the regime of his assassination. Following the September 2006 broadcast of A Flood in Baath Country by Al Arabiya, which was seen by Syrian viewers, Amiralay was detained at the Jordan–Syria border as he attempted to travel to Jordan to work on a film that same month. He was subjected to a 13-hour interrogation, arrested, and restricted from leaving Syria. In protest, a screening of A Flood in Baath Country, featuring a debate and an introduction from writer Farouk Mardam Bey, was held in France on October 31, 2006. The restriction on Amiralay's travel was lifted on October 29, 2006.

A Flood in Baath Country was Amiralay's final film. He died from cardiac arrest on February 5, 2011, a few weeks before the beginning of the Syrian revolution.

=== Critical reception and legacy ===
James Bennett called the film "a chilling look at a society stunted by Ba'athism". Lebanese Film scholar Rasha Salti called the documentary "possibly the most explicit and compelling critique yet of Ba'athist ideology". American critic Stuart Klawans described A Flood in Baath Country as one of Amiralay's "most forceful" films. Laura U. Marks said of A Flood in Baath Country that "Amiralay indicts the self-serving Ba'ath regime with unremitting yet subtle sarcasm." Middle East reporters Robin Yassin-Kassab and Leila al-Shami call it Amiralay's "masterpiece of grim irony", and Lebanese curator Edwin Nasr called the film "a staggering confession of regret and a militant takedown of the Assad regime." Professor of Arabic literature Nathalie Khankan called the film "an impossible-to-forget corrective, an incisive indictment of Ba'athist ideology and policy". The Austrian Film Museum said the film represented "a melancholy yet bitter summation of Syria's era of state socialism", and Tribeca Festival's Peter Scarlet called it "[a] rare contemporary example of filmmaking combining formal mastery with political courage". Amiralay's obituary in The Times says that A Flood in Baath Country "brought him to international renown". Writing for Arabi21, Tarek Ouchen described the scene in which Khaled al-Mashi celebrates the donation of computers from Bashar al-Assad as "one of the most evocative scenes portraying the state of Assad's Syria and the Ba'ath Party".

Mohamad al-Roumi, who assisted in early shooting for the film, found that while the film lacked "a dramatic dimension" and failed to explore characters like Diab al-Mashi as victims of the Ba'ath Party, it is "without a doubt an important document of what Syria lived through because of the Ba'ath Party and the authorities in power." In 2013, the film was ranked #45 on the Dubai International Film Festival's list of the top 100 Arab films. Antoine Wauters's novel Mahmoud ou la Montée des eaux was inspired by A Flood in Baath Country. The novel's main character, Mahmoud, is based on an elderly former resident of one of the villages submerged by Lake Assad, filmed in A Flood in Baath Country speaking on a boat about his former village which now lay directly beneath him in the water.

In February 2013, armed insurgents from the al-Nusra Front, among other groups, took control of Tabqa dam and the surrounding area. Reporter Nael Hariri wrote that the incident "strongly evoked" A Flood in Baath Country. The film was evoked in 2017 by Syrian Journalist Ola Abbas when ISIS bombed Tabqa Dam, bringing the possibility of its collapse (and a resultant true "flood in Ba'ath country") closer.
