= Omar Amiralay =

Syrian documentary film director (1944–2011)

- عمر أميرالاي
- Born: 20 October 1944; Damascus, French Mandate of Syria
- Died: 5 February 2011 (aged 66); Damascus, Syria
- Years active: 1970–2011
- Awards: Berlin International Film Festival – Interfilm Award – Otto Dibelius Film Award; 1976 Everyday Life in a Syrian Village

Omar Amiralay (Arabic: عمر أميرالاي; 20 October 1944 – 5 February 2011) was a Syrian documentary film director and civil society activist. He is noted for the political criticism in his films, and played a prominent role in the events of the Damascus Spring of 2000.

== Life and work ==
Amiralay was born in Damascus on 20 October 1944. He studied in Paris at Théâtre de la Ville between 1966–7 and later at Institut des hautes études cinématographiques (IDHEC), before returning to Syria in 1970. He thus had a different artistic formation from the majority of Syrian film-makers, who studied in the Soviet Union or in Eastern Europe.

His films include a trilogy of documentaries concerning the Tabqa Dam on the Euphrates. The first, Film Essay on the Euphrates Dam (1970), is a tribute to Syria's greatest development project, but the second and third take a more critical approach. Everyday Life in a Syrian Village (1974) shows the dam's ambiguous impact on the lives of ordinary people in a nearby village, and portrays their relationship with the authorities, seen as distant and disconnected from them. Amiralay revisited the region in 2003 with A Flood in Baath Country, which contains trenchant political criticism (it had the working title Twelve Reasons Why Omar Hates the Baath Party). Due to the films strong indictment of the government, the film was removed from the Carthage Film Festival. In act of solidarity with Amiralay, Arab filmmakers Yousry Nasrallah, Annemarie Jacir, Nizar Hassan, Joana and Khalil Joreige, and Danielle Arbid subsequently pulled their films out of Competition to protest the festival's actions. As a result, A Flood in Baath Country was re-programmed and screened to enthusiastic crowds.

Another notable film was There Are So Many Things Still to Say, based on interviews with the Syrian playwright Saadallah Wannous recorded while the latter was dying of cancer. The film juxtaposes Wannous' remarks with scenes from Syria's wars against Israel and the Palestinian First Intifada, as the playwright recounts, with some regret for the lost opportunities that resulted, how the Palestinian struggle became a central part of intellectual life for an entire generation.

His other films include a portrait of former Lebanese prime minister Rafiq al-Hariri, The Man with the Golden Soles, co-directed with Hala Al-Abdallah Yacoub and one of French academic and student of Middle Eastern society Michel Seurat, who died in Beirut during the Lebanese Civil War, On a Day of Ordinary Violence, My Friend Michel Seurat....

Omar Amiralay died on 5 February 2011, either from cardiac arrest or a cerebral thrombosis. In her film Omar Amiralay - Sorrow, Time and Silence (2021), Hala Al-Abdallah Yacoub features private moments of her discussions with Omar before his death, a unique testimony of his life.

== Activism ==
In 2000 Amiralay was a signatory to the "Statement of 99", a manifesto signed by 99 prominent Syrian intellectuals calling for an end to the state of emergency in force since 1963, the release of all political prisoners and prisoners of conscience, and the permitting of political parties and independent civil society organizations. This was seen as an expression of the general goals of the Syrian democratic opposition and of the movement known as the Damascus Spring in general. Amiralay was a prominent participant in the various debates and petitions that marked the Damascus Spring.

In 2005, in the aftermath of the assassination of former Lebanese prime minister Rafic Hariri, Amiralay signed a declaration by Syrian intellectuals calling for a Syrian withdrawal from Lebanon and an end to the attacks on Syrian workers in that country. Despite these activities, Amiralay did not consider himself to be involved in politics, but in "civil society".

== Filmography ==
- Film Essay on the Euphrates Dam (1970)
- Everyday Life in a Syrian Village (1974)
- The Chickens (1977)
- On a Revolution (1978)
- The Misfortunes of Some... (1981)
- A Scent of Paradise (1982)
- Love Aborted (1983)
- Video on Sand (1984)
- The Intimate Enemy (1986)
- The Lady of Shibam (1988)
- East of Eden (1988)
- For the Attention of Madame the Prime Minister Benazir Bhutto (1990)
- Light and Shadows (1994)
- The Master (1995)
- On a Day of Ordinary Violence, My Friend Michel Seurat... (1996)
- There Are So Many Things Still to Say (1997)
- A Plate of Sardines (1997)
- The Man with the Golden Soles (1999)
- A Flood in Baath Country (2003)
