= Jebel Aruda =

Archaeological site in Syria

- Location within Syria
- 36°14′6″N 38°5′54″E
- Type: settlement
- Periods: Uruk V
- Location: Raqqa Governorate, Syria

History
- Built: 4th millennium BC

Site notes
- Excavation dates: 1972-1982
- Archaeologists: G. Van Driel
- Condition: Ruined
- Owner: Public
- Public access: Yes

Jebel Aruda (also Djebel Aruda or Jebel 'Aruda or Sheikh 'Arud or Gebel Aruda or Gabal Aruda), is an ancient Near East archaeological site on the west bank of the Euphrates river in Raqqa Governorate, Syria. It was excavated as part of a program of rescue excavation project for sites to be submerged by the creation of Lake Assad by the Tabqa Dam. The site was occupied in the Late Chalcolithic, during the late 4th millennium BC, specifically in the Uruk V period. It is on the opposite side of the lake from the Halafian site of Shams ed-Din Tannira and is within sight of the Uruk V site Habuba Kabira (8 kilometers downstream) and thought to have been linked to it. The archaeological sites of Tell es-Sweyhat and Tell Hadidi are also nearby.

== Archaeology ==
The site, which lies 60 meters above the west bank of the Euphrates River, was founded on virgin soil, and covers an area of about 3 hectares. There is a 9.5 meter high 80 meter by 70 meter temple terrace with a stone foundation. An area of about 1 hectare has been excavated. Excavators defined three areas, a temple precinct, northern houses, and southern houses. Three charcoal samples, associated with a fragment of a miniature limestone clay wheel, gave calibrated radiocarbon dates of 3335–3103 BC, 3333–3101BC, and 3315–2916BC.

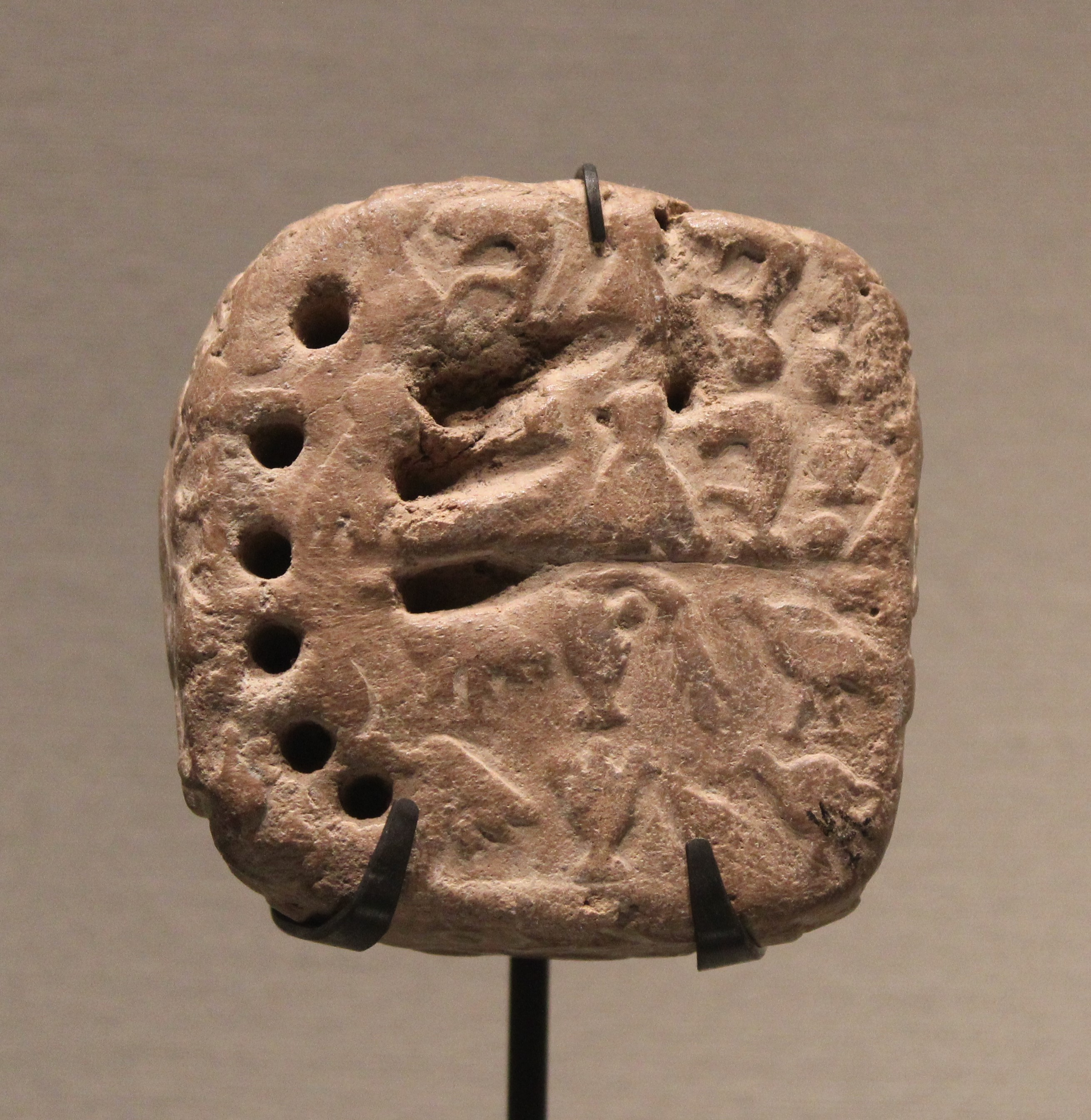
Uruk V period numerical tablet found at Susa

In 1909 Gertrude Bell observed the tell on a journey down the East bank of the Euphrates river but was prevented from crossing over to explore it by high winds. After having been visited by Maurits Van Loon in 1964 as part of the rescue survey the site of Jebel Aruda was excavated, as part of the Tabqa Dam rescue effort, between 1972 and 1982 by a Dutch team from the University of Leiden led by G. Van Driel. Finds from this excavation are held in the Dutch National Museum of Antiquities though are property of the government of Syria. Finds include eight copper axes (alternatively described as ingots). In a storeroom several kilograms of unprocessed lapis lazuli and a variety of precious stones were excavated. After a forty-year delay the excavation final report was finally released in 2023.

In the southern houses area of the mound there are "T-Form" manor houses, suggested as prototypes for the later Mesopotamian E-GAL temples. Houses in the northern areas were more of a residential nature (Similar to those found at the nearby Uruk V site of [[Habuba Kabira|Habuba Kabira South]]) but included areas with industrial functions. Kilns were found in the courtyard of NC-NF compounds associated with ashy deposits containing a large number of bevel rim bowls and flower pots. The northern houses area was destroyed by fire. A few of the ceramic objects had been coated with bitumen. Clay sealing were found at the site.

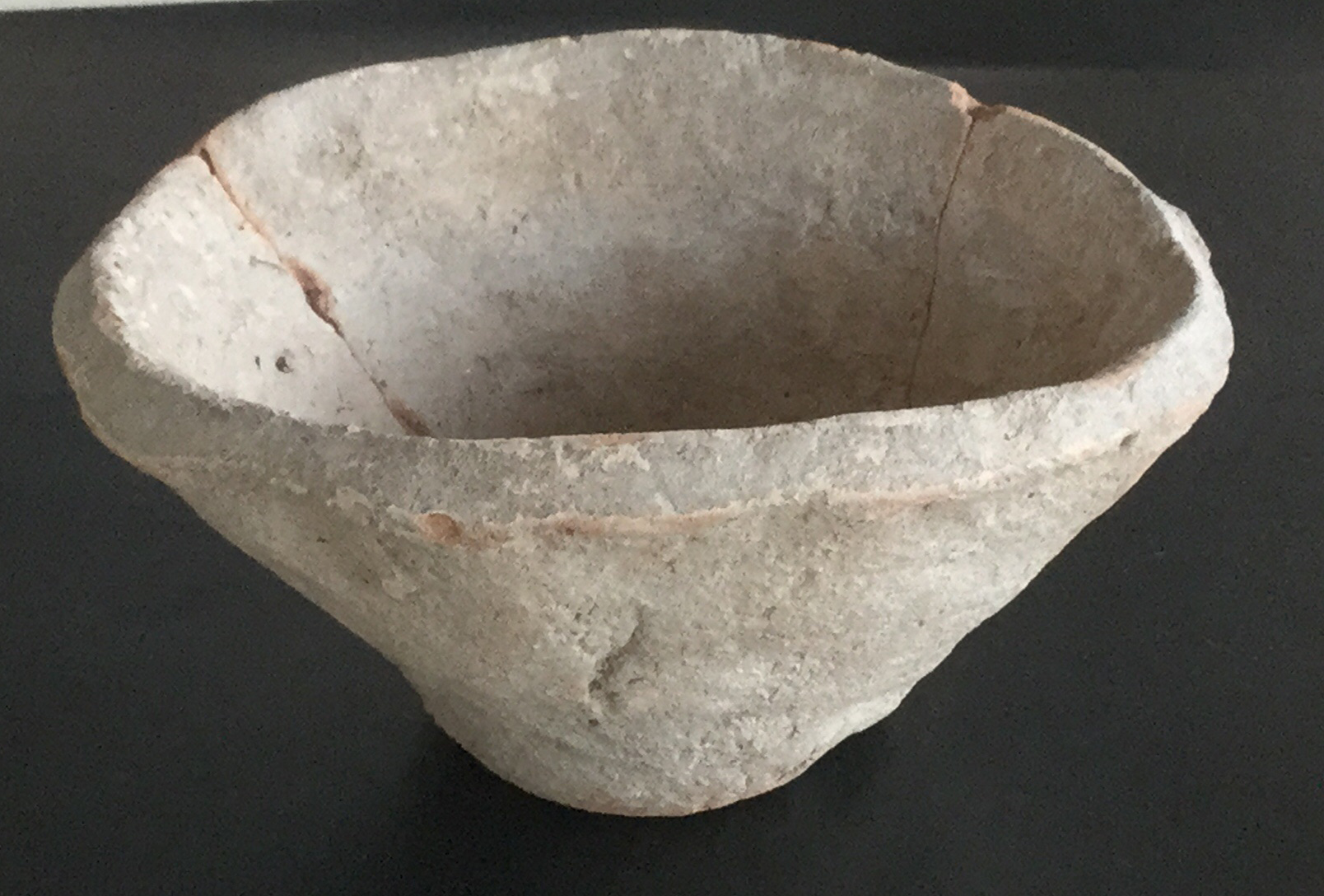
Uruk period beveled rim bowl from nearby Hubaba Kubira

In the elevated temple precinct were two 40 square meter tripartite structures with the typical Uruk period niched facades, one named the Red Temple and another named the Grey Temple, assumed to have religious and possibly administrative functions. The Red Temple had a triple entrance leading across three vestibules into the cult room at the center. The Grey Temple had two entrances leading to a central area with a closed sacristy. The temple precinct is surrounded by a niched wall. There were two building phases with the Red Temple built in the first phase and the Grey Temple added in the second. Occupation ended in a nonviolent manner being emptied, leveled, and filled in with large mudbricks. This resulted in very few finds, amounting to a small number of flower pots and seal impressions.

Thirteen Uruk V period "numerical tablets" (possibly a precursor to Proto-cuneiform and Proto-Elamite), sometimes called "impressed tablets", were found at the site in the southern houses area, some sealed. Four of the tablets were found in a large T-shaped room near the temple precinct. Eleven Neolithic clay tokens were also excavated.

== History ==
Jebel Aruda is a single period site, occupied in three phases in the Uruk V period (c. 3500-3350 BC) of the late 4th millennium BC.

== Tell Sheikh Hassan ==
Tell Sheikh Hassan (also Tall Sheikh Hassan and Tall Šaih Hasan) was a walled ancient Near East settlement across the Euphrates from Jebel Aruda. Originally on the left bank of the Euphrates river, it is now an island as a result of flooding from the Tabqa Dam. Its original height of 14 meters and area of 5 hectares has been reduced to half a hectare. The site was occupied during the Neolithic and Uruk periods and again in the Iron Age and through to the Islamic period.

In 1909 Gertrude Bell observed the tell on a journey down the East bank of the Euphrates river. The site was examined in 1963 by Abdul Kader Rihaoui and in 1964 by Maurits. N. van Loon. Tell Sheikh Hassan was excavated between 1972 and 1994 as part of the Tabqa Dam rescue archaeology project. A French team led by A. Bounni (1972 to 1974), J. Cauvin (1976), and D. Stordeur (1993) focused on the Pre-Pottery Neolithic A and Pre-Pottery Neolithic B (9th and 10th millennium BC) areas. A German team in 1981 led by W. Orthmann and from 1984 to 1990 and from 1992 to 1994 led by J. Boesse of the University of Saarbruecken focused on the Late-Terminal Ubaid period, Uruk period (4th millennium BC) and Iron Age (1st millennium BC) areas. Smelting crucibles were found among the 17 Middle Uruk levels. Beveled rim bowls were also found. Bullae and tokens, and cylinder seals were in use as was bitumen. This is one of the earliest known uses of cylinder seals. Also in the Uruk period levels a left bent axis single shrine temple was found. In the Iron Age levels a Bit-hilani palace was uncovered. Five ostracon, inscribed in Aramaic and dated to the 5th century BC, were found in the rubble of an Iron Age building.

== Tell Qraya ==
The small but notable Tell Qraya (also Tall Qurayya) site lies about 50 miles south of the modern city of Deir ez-Zor in the Deir ez-Zor Governorate, Syria. It sits on the west bank of the Euphrates river about 9 miles south of the confluence with the Habur River and about 6 kilometers north of ancient Terqa on that bank. It was part of the 4th millennium BC Uruk Expansion (of the type generally called outposts) with Tell Ramadi, 60 miles away and near ancient Mari, being the nearest Uruk period site. Occupation was radiocarbon dated to the Late Chalcolithic 3 period with a calibrated dates of c. 3900-3370 BC, c. 3940-3380 BC, and c. 3950-3380 BC. Tell Qraya covers an area of about 4 hectares being 150 meters in diameter. Modern homes cover around 3/4 of the site. After being identified in a regional survey, from 1977 to 1979 the site was worked by a team under the direction of Giorgio Buccellati and Marilyn Kelly-Buccellati, finding 15 occupational levels corresponding to three architectural phases beginning in the Ubaid period. The site was abandoned at the beginning of the 3rd millennium BC after the Late Uruk period and then reoccupied at the beginning of the 2nd millennium BC in the Old Babylonian period. The site was in danger from local inhabitants with 4 meters in height, and most of the 2nd millennium BC occupation, already lost to building activity. Excavation occurred in 1981, led by Daniel Shimabuku, and 1984, led by Steven Reimer. Over a thousand Beveled rim bowls, diagnostic of the Uruk Culture were found with about 160 being intact. They were found associated with ovens. About two dozen clay sealings (made with cylinder seals and stamp seals) were found, on door seals, jar stoppers, and clay bullae. It has been suggested that the beveled rim bowls were used in the production of salt and an experiment was conducted at the site to test this proposal.

== See also ==
- Cities of the ancient Near East
- Chronology of the ancient Near East
- Hacınebi Tepe
