= Sweyhat =

- Location within Syria
- 36°16′27″N 38°15′14″E
- Location: Syria
- Region: Raqqa Governorate

Tell es-Sweyhat is the name of a large archaeological site on the Euphrates River in northern Syria. It is located in Raqqa Governorate roughly 95 km northeast of Aleppo and 60 km south of Carchemish. Also, a Uruk site of Jebel Aruda and a Bronze Age site Tell Hadidi (Azu) are located just across the river.

== History ==
Sweyhat dates from 3100–1900 BC, or the Early Bronze Age and the very beginning of the Middle Bronze Age. The site covers approximately 45 hectares and consists of a central, high mound standing 15 meters above the surrounding plain and an extensive low mound surrounded by the remains of an earthen rampart. In the time of the Ur III Empire at the end of the 2nd millennium BC it was destroyed by fire and abandoned until the Hellenistic Period. The site is located within Mesopotamia in a very marginal environment for agriculture, yet in antiquity it was a prosperous city.

== Archaeology ==
Sweyhat is best known for its intact fortifications of the mid-to-late 3rd millennium BC and its late-3rd-millennium temple located at the summit of the high mound. In 1993, the Penn excavators discovered a large cemetery of shaft-and-chamber tombs in the Low Mound dating to the mid 3rd millennium BC. Sweyhat is a classic example of a Kranzhugel (German, "crown-mound") — a form of ruin mound typical of the Bronze Age in northwestern Mesopotamia consists of a high mound surrounded by a lower ring mound.

Sweyhat was excavated by Thomas Holland for the Ashmolean Museum, Oxford University in 1973–75. These excavations were part of the Tabqa Dam Salvage Project, initiated to save sites threatened by the formation of the impound lake, Lake Assad, behind a hydroelectric dam on the Euphrates River near the town of Tabqa. These excavations were renewed by Holland from the Oriental Institute of Chicago and Richard L. Zettler from the University of Pennsylvania Museum in 1989. This joint project excavated the site in 1989 and 1991. The Oriental Institute excavated again in 1992 and then halted operations at the site. Zettler carried out field seasons for the UPM in 1993, 1995, 1998, 2000, 2001, 2005, and 2007. The project, which ended in 2010, was directed by Michael D. Danti of Boston University's Department of Archaeology. Among their finds were three Early Bronze Age tombs, one of which had not been robbed.

Tell Hajji Ibrahim is another important Uruk site in the area.

== See also ==
- Cities of the Ancient Near East
