= On a Day of Ordinary Violence, My Friend Michel Seurat... =

On a Day of Ordinary Violence, My Friend Michel Seurat... في يوم من أيام العنف العادي، مات صديقي ميشيل سورا
- Directed by: Omar Amiralay
- Produced by: Arte France and Maram CTV
- Narrated by: Omar Amiralay
- Cinematography: Abdelkader Shurbaji
- Edited by: Chantal Piquet
- Distributed by: Arte
- Release date: 1996
- Running time: fifty minutes
- Countries: France; Syria
- Languages: Arabic; French

On a Day of Ordinary Violence, My Friend Michel Seurat... (Arabic: في يوم من أيام العنف العادي، مات صديقي ميشيل سورا) is a Syrian documentary film by the director Omar Amiralay. The film is an elegy to sociologist academic Michel Seurat. Seurat died after being kidnapped by Islamic Jihad, a precursor to Hezbollah, in Lebanon in 1985.
