= Dibsi Faraj =

Archaeological site in Aleppo, Syria

- Athis (?) (Roman), Neocaesarea (?) (Late Roman/Byzantine), Qasrin (Early Islamic)
- Location within Syria
- 35.95°N 38.16667°E
- Type: settlement
- Periods: Roman, Byzantine, Umayyad
- Location: Syria
- Region: Aleppo Governorate

History
- Event: earthquake (859 CE)

Site notes
- Area: 5 ha (12 acres) (citadel), 20 ha (49 acres) (outer town)
- Excavation dates: 1972–1974
- Archaeologists: R.P. Harper
- Condition: flooded by Lake Assad
- Public access: no

Dibsi Faraj is an archaeological site on the right bank of the Euphrates in Aleppo Governorate (Syria). The site was excavated as part of a larger international effort coordinated by UNESCO to excavate as many archaeological sites as possible in the area that would be flooded by the reservoir created by the Tabqa Dam, which was being built at that time. An initial, small archaeological sounding was done at Dibsi Faraj by the Syrian Department of Antiquities in 1971. Following this investigation, the site was excavated between 1972 and 1974 as part of a joint operation of the Dumbarton Oaks Center for Byzantine Studies and the Kelsey Museum of Archaeology at the University of Michigan under the direction of Richard P. Harper. Since then, the site has disappeared under the rising waters of Lake Assad, the reservoir created by the Tabqa Dam.

The excavations revealed that the site was occupied between the first and tenth century CE. During this period, the site developed from a Roman village during the first century to a third-century heavily fortified urban settlement that was extensively modified during the early Byzantine period. The excavations revealed that the site was largely abandoned during the Early Islamic period, probably after an earthquake in 859 CE caused much destruction.

Dibsi Faraj was strategically located on a hilltop overlooking agricultural fields and grazing grounds. The site consisted of an upper town of 5 hectares (12 acres) where the oldest traces of settlement were found, and a lower town of 20 hectares (49 acres). In the upper town, houses were limited to the eastern part of the site. In the western part, several public buildings were excavated, including a public bath, a Christian basilica and a principia or military headquarters. The upper town was surrounded by a stone wall with towers and four gates. These walls were constructed during the reign of Emperor Diocletian at the end of the third century and refurbished during the fifth century. Excavations beyond the walls uncovered a house in the lower town, an earth wall surrounding it and a second basilica.

The ancient names of Dibsi Faraj are not known with certainty. The proposal that places Thapsacus at Dibsi Faraj does not find much support in the scientific community. By combining different sources, most scholars agree that Dibsi Faraj should be identified with Athis during the Early Roman occupation of the site. During the Late Roman and Early Byzantine periods, the site was probably known as Neocaesarea. The name of Dibsi Faraj after the Umayyad takeover, Qasrin, is certain as it is connected to a canal constructed during that time which could still be identified at the time of the excavation.

== See also ==
- Rescue excavations in the Tishrin Dam Reservoir region
