= Tell Fray =

- Yakharisha or Shaparu
- Location within Syria
- 35.903545°N 38.384198°E
- Type: tell
- Periods: Late Bronze Age
- Location: Syria
- Region: Raqqa Governorate

Site notes
- Excavation dates: 1972–1973
- Archaeologists: Adnan Bounni, Paolo Matthiae
- Condition: flooded by Lake Assad
- Public access: no

Tell Fray is a tell, or settlement mound, on the east bank of the Euphrates in Raqqa Governorate, northern Syria. The archaeological site takes its name from an ancient irrigation canal, hence 'Fray' or 'Little Euphrates'. It was part of a rescue excavation project for sites to be submerged by the creation of Lake Assad by the Tabqa Dam.

== Excavations ==
It was excavated in 1972 and 1973 as a joint Syrian–Italian operation under the direction of Adnan Bounni of the Syrian Service of Archaeological Excavations and the Sapienza University of Rome under the direction of Paolo Matthiae, the excavator of Ebla along with the Aleppo Museum directed by Ch. Chaath, and Johns Hopkins University. The operation was part of the UNESCO-coordinated international effort to excavate as many sites as possible in the area that would be flooded by the reservoir of the Tabqa Dam, which was being constructed at that time. Tell Fray disappeared under the rising waters of Lake Assad in 1974.

The excavations revealed occupation layers dating to the 14th century BCE, or Late Bronze Age. There were at least two temples in this city, one of them probably devoted to the god Teshub. The southern temple had 0.8 meter thick walls. A number of houses were also excavated. Two of these houses belonged to important officials. One of these was possibly a local representative or governor of the Hittite king, whereas the other was responsible for the maintenance of the canals in the area.

The clay tablets found at Tell Fray indicate that the site belonged to the influence sphere of Ashtata (Astata), centered on Emar, which in turn fell under Carchemish, upstream from both Emar and Tell Fray. Text finds included a 12th/13th century BC will. A clay sealing of late Hittite ruler Ḫattušili III (c. 1275–1245 BC) was also found.

The site was destroyed by fire in the 13th century BCE, probably by the Middle Assyrian kings Shalmaneser I or Tukulti-Ninurta I, when the Assyrians conquered this area.

Based on the cuneiform texts found in Tell Fray and elsewhere, it has been proposed that the name of the ancient site was either Yakharisha or Shaparu. Finds from the excavation are now on display in the National Museum of Aleppo.

== See also ==
- Rescue excavations in the Tishrin Dam Reservoir region
