= There Are So Many Things Still to Say =

There Are So Many Things Still to Say وهناك أشياء كثيرة كان يمكن أن يتحدث عنها المرء
- Directed by: Omar Amiralay
- Produced by: ARTE France - Grains de Sable
- Narrated by: Saadallah Wannous
- Cinematography: Etienne De Grammont
- Edited by: Dominique Pâris
- Distributed by: Grains de Sable
- Release date: 1997
- Running time: 49 minutes
- Countries: France; Syria
- Languages: Arabic, French and English subtitles

There Are So Many Things Still to Say (Arabic: وهناك أشياء كثيرة كان يمكن أن يتحدث عنها المرء) is a Syrian documentary film by the director Omar Amiralay. The film was based on an interview with Syrian playwright Saadallah Wannous a few months before he died of cancer. Wannous, Amiralay's friend, speaks about his disappointment and grief relating to the Arab–Israeli conflict and the 1991 Gulf War.
