= A Plate of Sardines =

A Plate of Sardines طبق السردين أو المرّة الأولى التي سمعت فيها بإسرائيل
- Directed by: Omar Amiralay
- Produced by: ARTE France - Grains de Sable
- Narrated by: Omar Amiralay
- Cinematography: Etienne De Grammont
- Edited by: Domminique Pâris
- Distributed by: Grains de Sable
- Release date: 1997
- Running time: 17 minutes
- Country: France
- Languages: Arabic, French and English subtitles

A Plate of Sardines (Arabic: طبق السردين) is a Syrian documentary film by the director Omar Amiralay. In it, Amiralay tells the story of how he first heard of Israel. In the documentary, he controversially criticized the Israeli and Syrian governments, the latter of which banned the film.
