= Mansoura Dam =

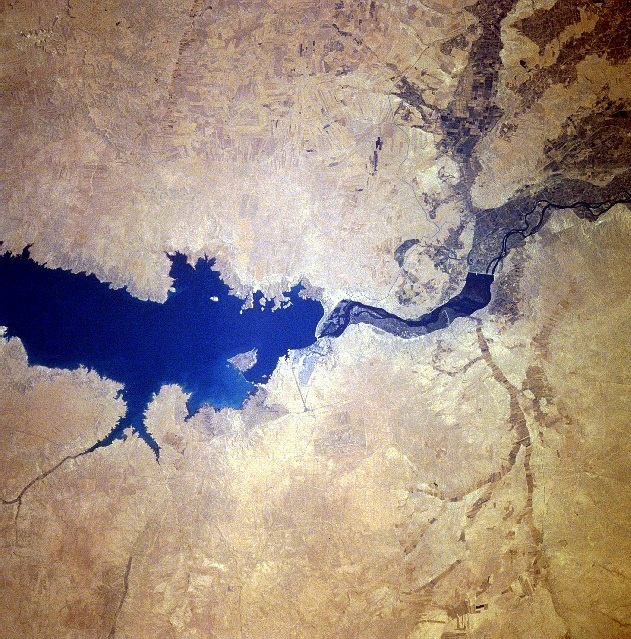
- Mansoura Dam (right), Euphrates Dam (centre), and Euphrates Lake (left) from space, June 1996. North is in the upper left corner of the image.

- Location within Syria
- Official name: سد المنصورة
- Location: Raqqa Governorate, Syria
- Coordinates: 35°53′07″N 38°44′50″E
- Construction began: 1983
- Opening date: 1986

Dam and spillways
- Impounds: Euphrates
- Height: 14 m (46 ft)

Reservoir
- Creates: Mansoura Lake
- Total capacity: 0.09 km^{3} (0.02 cu mi)

Power Station
- Installed capacity: 81 MW

The Mansoura Dam (Arabic: سد المنصورة), formerly the Baath Dam and the Freedom Dam, is a dam on the Euphrates, located 22 kilometres (14 mi) upstream from the city of Raqqa in Raqqa Governorate, Syria. Construction of the dam started in 1983 and was finished in 1986. It is intended to generate hydroelectric power as well as regulate the irregular flow from the Tabqa Dam, which is located 18 kilometres (11 mi) upstream from the Mansoura Dam. These irregularities in the flow from the Tabqa Dam are caused by changes in the electricity demand. The Mansoura Dam is 14 metres (46 ft) high and the installed water turbines can generate 81 MW. The storage capacity of the Mansoura Dam Reservoir is 0.09 cubic kilometres (0.022 cu mi).

The Mansoura Dam is one of three dams on the Syrian Euphrates, the other two being the Tabqa Dam, and the Tishrin Dam 80 kilometres (50 mi) south of the Syria-Turkish border. Like the Baath Dam, the Tishrin Dam is also functionally related to the Tabqa Dam. Construction of the Tishrin Dam was partly motivated by the disappointing performance of the hydroelectric power station in the Tabqa Dam. Before the Syrian civil war, Syria had plans to construct a fourth dam – the Halabiye Dam – on the Euphrates, downstream from the Mansoura Dam. Before its renaming to the Mansoura Dam, the dam was named Freedom Dam by the SDF, and prior to that, was named after the Syrian Arab Socialist Ba'ath Party.

== Syrian civil war ==
On 4 February 2013, opposition forces captured the dam, a week before capturing the Tabqa Dam. The Baath Dam was captured from the ISIL by the Syrian Democratic Forces on 4 June 2017. Upon doing so, they renamed it the "Freedom Dam" (Kurdish: Bendava Azadî; Arabic: سد الحرية; Classical Syriac: ܣܟܪܐ ܕܚܐܪܘܬܐ, romanized: Sekro d'Ḥirutho). ISIL used the complex as a prison. In 2019, control of the dam was given by the SDF to the Syrian Ba'athist government after the Turkish invasion of Northern Syria. By 18 January 2026, the Mansoura fell under the control of Syrian transitional government.

== See also ==
- Euphrates Lake
- Water resources management in Syria
- List of cities and towns on the Euphrates River
