= Marie Seurat =

Syrian novelist (born 1949)

- Born: Marie Maamar Bachi; 26 January 1949 (age 77); Aleppo, Syria
- Known for: writer
- Spouse: Michel Seurat (m.1973—1986; his death)

Marie Maamar Seurat (née. Bachi, 26 January 1949) is a Syrian novelist.

== Life ==
Marie Maamar Bachi was born on 26 January 1949 in Aleppo. Her father was a farmer. From 1965 she studied graphic arts at Oxford and then she moved to the United States. In 1973 she met Michel Seurat in Beirut. She married the sociologist and researcher at the CNRS who is kidnapped May 22, 1985 in Beirut by the Islamic Jihad Organization. The death of her husband was announced on March 5, 1986. Following these events she wrote the book The Crows of Aleppo, where she denounced the hypocrisy of politics.

== Works ==
- Birds of Ill Omen. Quartet, 1990, ISBN 9780704326941.
- One so close East
- A shooting star, the broken fate of Asmahane
- My Kingdom of Wind, Memories of Hester Stanhope

== See also ==
- Syrian literature
