= Emar =

Ancient city in Syria

- 𒂍𒈥 (Akkadian)
- Tell Meskene (Arabic: تل مسكنة)
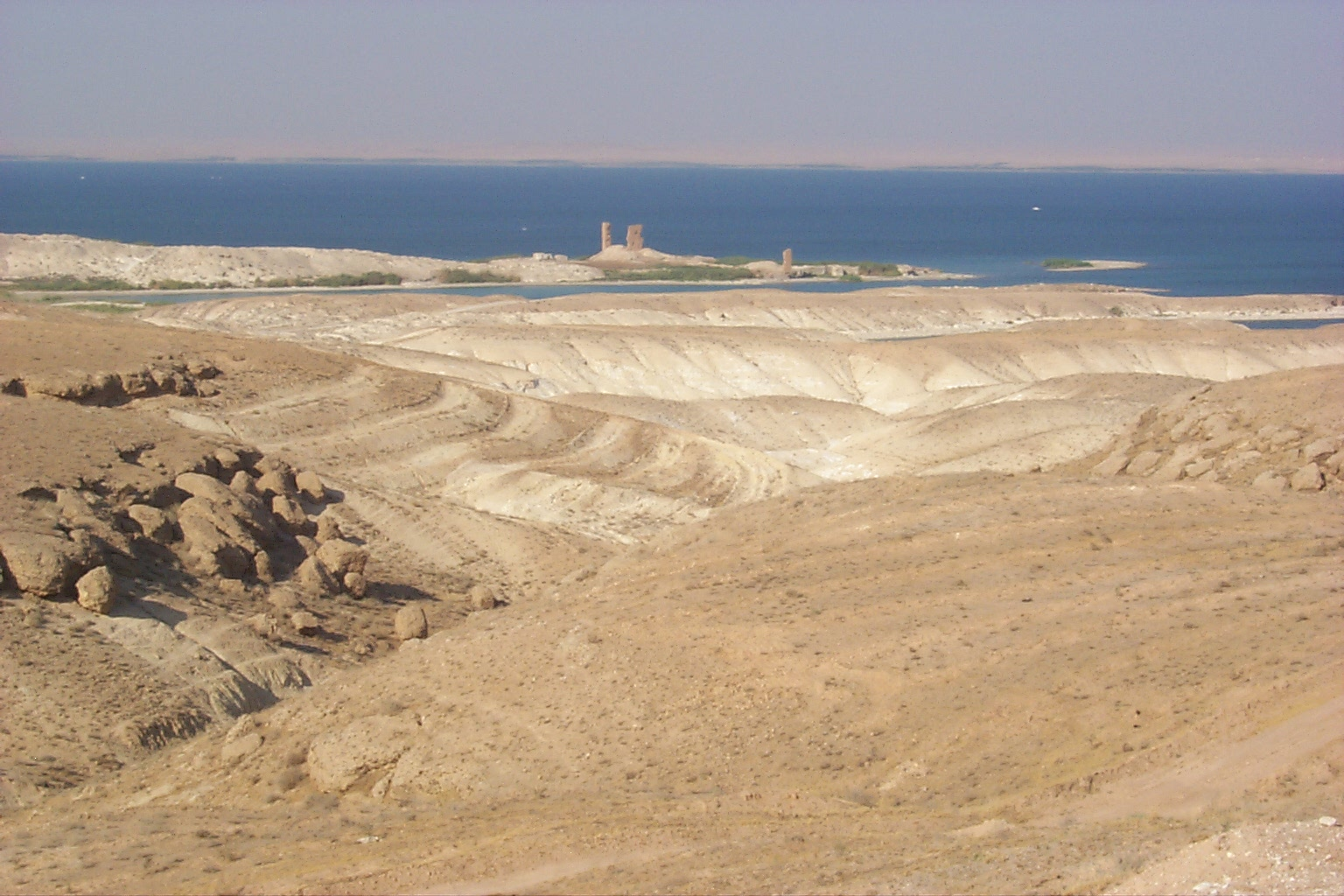
- View from the Byzantine Tower at Meskene, ancient Barbalissos

- Location within Syria
- 35°59′12.63″N 38°6′40.95″E
- Type: settlement
- Cultures: Amorite
- Satellite of: Ebla, Yamhad, Carchemish
- Location: Near Maskanah, Aleppo Governorate, Syria
- Region: Euphrates Lake shoreline

History
- Abandoned: 1187 BC

Site notes
- Excavation dates: 1972–1976; 1996–2002
- Archaeologists: Jean-Claude Margueron
- Owner: Public
- Public access: Yes

Emar (Akkadian: 𒂍𒈥, É-mar), is an archaeological site at Tell Meskene in the Aleppo Governorate of northern Syria. It sits in the great bend of the mid-Euphrates, now on the shoreline of the man-made Lake Assad near the town of Maskanah.

It has been the source of many cuneiform tablets, making it rank with Ugarit, Mari and Ebla among the most important archaeological sites of Syria. In these texts, dating from the 14th century BC to the fall of Emar in 1187 BC, and in excavations in several campaigns since the 1970s, Emar emerges as an important Bronze Age trade center, occupying a liminal position between the power centers of Upper Mesopotamia and Anatolia–Syria. Unlike other cities, the tablets preserved at Emar, most of them in Akkadian and of the thirteenth century BC, are not royal or official, but record private transactions, judicial records, dealings in real estate, marriages, last wills, formal adoptions. In the house of a priest, a library contained literary and lexical texts in the Mesopotamian tradition, and ritual texts for local cults. The area of Emar was fortified by the Romans, Byzantines, and medieval Arabs as Barbalissos or Balis but that location is slightly removed from the more ancient tell and is dealt with in its separate article.

== History ==
Emar was strategically sited as a trans-shipping point where trade on the Euphrates was reloaded for shipping by overland route.

=== Early Bronze ===
In the middle of the third millennium BC Emar came under the influence of the rulers of Ebla; the city is mentioned in archives at Ebla.

=== Middle Bronze ===
==== Yamhad period ====
MB IIA. In Mari texts of the eighteenth century BC, (Middle Bronze Age), Emar was under the influence of the neighboring Amorite state of Yamhad. There was no local tradition of kingship at Emar.

During the reign of Yarim-Lim of Aleppo the trade routes of the Great Kingdom of Yamhad peaked with trade coming from the Mediterranean Sea in the west to the port of Emar on the Euphrates in the east. At the same time Qatna and the Palmyra trade route to Mari declined in importance.

After the Kingdom of Mari ruled by Zimri-Lim was destroyed by Hammurabi of Babylon around 1763 BCE, and a new polity arose at Terqa as the capital of the Kingdom of Khana to the immediate east of Emar. However, trade was significantly weakened after this with the loss of Mari and the death of Hammurabi around 1750 BCE.

MB IIB. Around 1600 BCE, the Great Kingdom of Yamhad at Aleppo fell to constant attacks by Hattusili I and Mursili I of Hatti. This marked the end of MB IIB in the Northern Levant, transitioning to the Late Bronze Age.

=== Late Bronze ===
==== Mitanni period ====
In the Late Bronze, the region came under the control of the Mitanni. Following the fall of Aleppo, the royal family took refuge with the maternal line at Emar where prince Idrimi would emerge. Idrimi (~1470 BCE) would fight during a period of turmoil in Syria and re-establish Alalakh in the west and claim Aleppo as a subject of the Great King of Mitanni.

==== Hittite period ====
Around 1345 BCE, Suppiluliuma I of Hatti defeated Tushratta of Mitanni, and the region fell into the Hittite Empire. Following the Siege of Carchemish, Suppiluliuma I established that city as the capital of a viceroyalty. The Province of Astata with Emar as its capital would fall into the sphere of Carchemish.

For the thirteenth and the early twelfth centuries BC, there is written documentation from Emar itself, mostly in the Akkadian language, and also references in contemporaneous texts from Hattusa, Ugarit, and in Assyrian archives; at the time Emar was within the Hittite sphere of influence, subject to the king of Carchemish, a Hittite client-king. It was the chief city of a Hittite border province known as the Land of Astata (Ashtata) which included Tell Fray. Correlating the kings of Emar with the known king-list of Carchemish provides some absolute dating.

===== Siege of Emar =====
Archaeological and written documentation come to an end in the late twelfth century BC as a result of the Bronze Age collapse. The actual date of destruction has been placed at 1187 BC in the 2nd regnal year of king Meli-Shipak II of Babylon (r. 1186-1172 BCE).

The dating of this siege has been difficult to determine. With it occurring during the time of Bulalu, others place it during the reign of Pilsu-Dagan.

Tarwi (TAR.PI) conducted a successful siege of Emar during a 'year of distress' (famine). One proposal is to link the perpetrator of the siege with the city of Turira. While Yamada highlights these other dates, he himself goes on to state "Indeed, in view of the severity of the inflation, it may be even reasonable to assume that the siege by the TAR-PI troops and the tremendous famine led to the final destruction of Emar" and thus attributes this siege to the final destruction of the city.

=== Classical Age ===
==== Roman period ====
The site remained desolate at the unstable eastern borders of the Roman Empire, resettled nearby as Barbalissos. In 253, it was the site of the Battle of Barbalissos between the Sassanid Persians under Shapur I and Roman troops.

== Archaeology ==
The initial salvage excavations in advance of the rising waters of the Syrian Tabqa Dam project impounding Lake El Assad were undertaken by two French teams, in 1972-76, under the direction of Jean-Claude Margueron.

=== Late Bronze Age temple ===
Excavations revealed a temple area comprising the sanctuaries of the weather god Ba’al and possibly of his consort Astarte of the Late Bronze Age (thirteenth and early twelfth century BC).

=== Cuneiform tablets ===
After the conclusion of the French excavations the site was left unguarded and was systematically looted, bringing many cuneiform tablets onto the antiquities gray market stripped of their context. In 1992, the Syrian Directorate-General of Antiquities and Museums took charge of the site, and a fresh series of campaigns revealed earlier strata, of the Middle and Early Bronze Ages (second half of the third millennium and the first half of the second millennium BC) the Imar that was mentioned in the archives of Mari and elsewhere. Beginning in 1996, the Syrian effort was joined by a team from the University of Tübingen Germany.

So far, around 1100 tablets in Akkadian have been recovered from the site, 800 from the excavation and around 300 emerging on the antiquities market. In addition 100 tablets in Hurrian and 1 in Hittite have also been found. All but one of the tablets are from the Late Bronze Age.

== See also ==
- Cities of the ancient Near East
- Chronology of the ancient Near East
- Tell Hadidi
