= The Man with the Golden Soles =

The Man with the Golden Soles الرّجل ذو النعل الذهبي
- Directed by: Omar Amiralay
- Produced by: ARTE France - AMIP
- Narrated by: Omar Amiralay
- Cinematography: Hanna Ward
- Edited by: Dominique Pâris
- Distributed by: AMIP
- Release date: 2000
- Running time: 55 minutes
- Country: France
- Languages: Arabic, French subtitles

The Man with the Golden Soles (Arabic: الرجل ذو النعل الذهبي) is a Syrian documentary film by the director Omar Amiralay. The film, released in 2000, is about the then Lebanese Prime minister Rafic Hariri.
