= Damascus Roof and Tales of Paradise =

- Directed by: Soudade Kaadan
- Produced by: Anas Abdel Wahab
- Release date: December 2010 (Dubai International Film Festival)
- Country: Syria

Damascus Roof and Tales of Paradise is a 2010 Syrian documentary film directed by Soudade Kaadan and produced by Anas Abdel Wahab. The film premiered at the 2010 Dubai International Film Festival.

== Synopsis ==
Syrian traditional story-telling, folklore, tales, fictional mythological characters play an important role in their culture. This tradition is passed generation to the next generation — from grandparents to grandchildren. However, in the modern era these stories are being lost. This is happening in Damascus, the capital and the second largest city of Syria, too.

== Production ==
The film is directed by Soudade Kaadan. This was her second documentary film. Anas Abdel Wahab produced the film.
