= Euphrates Dam =

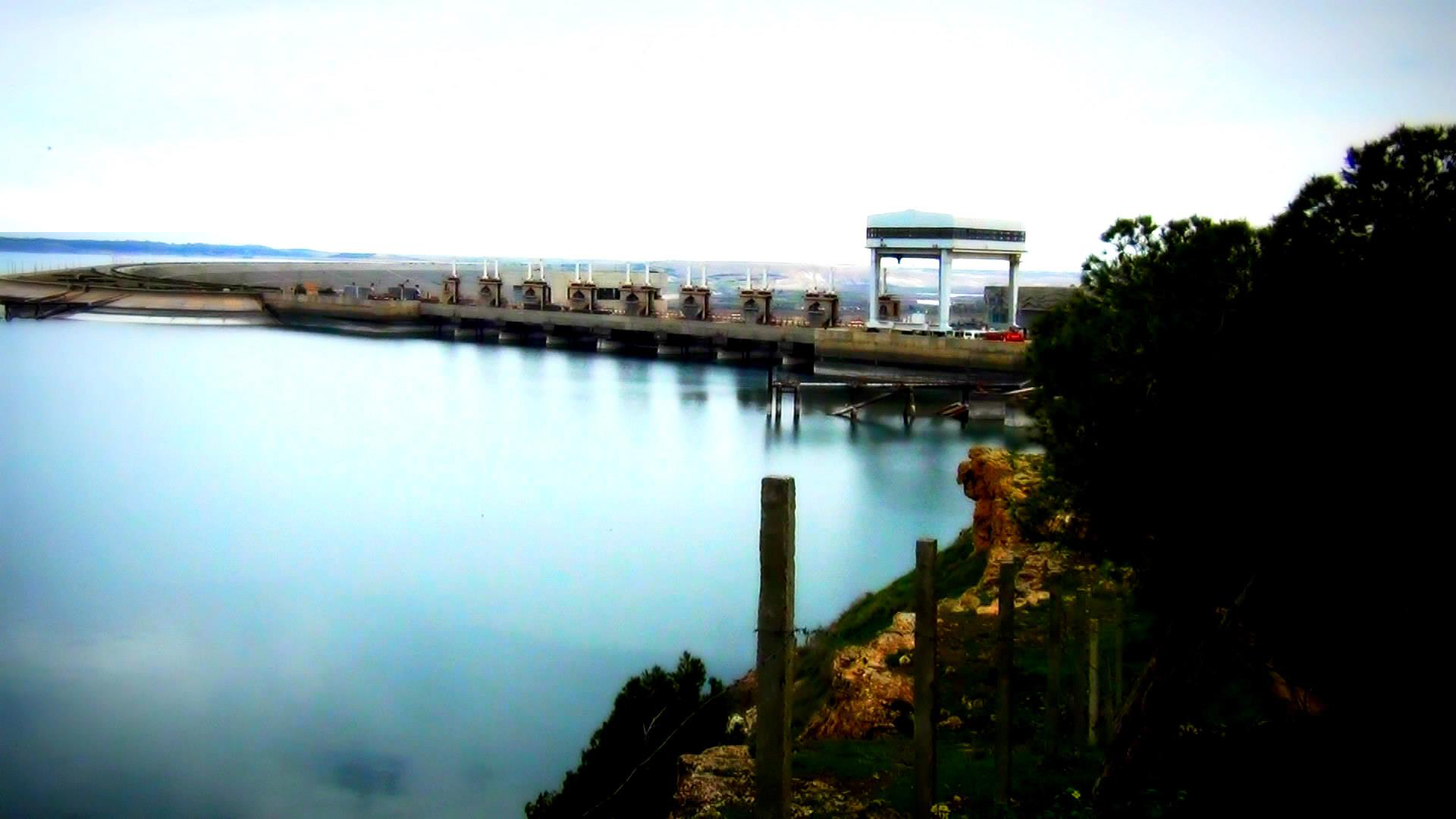
- Euphrates Dam

- Location within Syria
- Official name: سَدُّ الْفُرَاتِ
- Country: Syria
- Location: Al-Tabqah District, Raqqa Governorate, Syria
- Coordinates: 35°52′20″N 38°34′00″E
- Status: Operational
- Construction began: 1968
- Opening date: 1973
- Construction cost: US$340 million
- Owner: Government of Syria

Dam and spillways
- Type of dam: Earth-fill dam
- Impounds: Euphrates
- Height: 60 m (197 ft)
- Length: 4,500 m (14,764 ft)
- Width (crest): 19 m (62 ft)
- Width (base): 512 m (1,680 ft)

Reservoir
- Creates: Euphrates Lake
- Inactive capacity: 11.7 km^{3} (2.8 cu mi)
- Surface area: 610 km^{2} (236 sq mi)

Power Station
- Commission date: July 1973–8 March 1978
- Turbines: 8 x 103 MW Kaplan-type
- Installed capacity: 824 MW

The Euphrates Dam (Arabic: سَدُّ الْفُرَاتِ, romanized: Sadd al-Furāt; Kurdish: Bendava Firatê; Classical Syriac: ܣܟܪܐ ܕܦܪܬ, romanized: Sekro d'Frot), most commonly known as Tabqa Dam; (Note: (Arabic: سَدُّ الطَّبْقَةِ, romanized: Sadd aṭ-Ṭabqah, Kurdish: Bendava Tebqa) formerly known as al-Thawra Dam during the Ba'athist era (Note: (Arabic: سَدُّ الثَّوْرَةِ, romanized: Sadd aṯ-Ṯawrah, Kurdish: Bendava Tewra; Classical Syriac: ܣܟܪܐ ܕܬܘܪܗ, romanized: Sekro d'Ṯawra, literally "Revolution Dam")), is an embankment dam on the Euphrates, located 40 kilometres (25 mi) upstream from the city of Raqqa in Raqqa Governorate, Syria. The city of Al-Thawrah is located immediately south of the dam. The dam is 60 metres (200 ft) high and 4.5 kilometres (2.8 mi) long and is the largest dam in Syria. Its construction led to the creation of Euphrates Lake, Syria's largest water reservoir. The dam was constructed between 1968 and 1973 with help from the Soviet Union. At the same time, an international effort was made to excavate and document as many archaeological remains as possible in the area of the future lake before they would be flooded by the rising water. When the flow of the Euphrates was reduced in 1974 to fill the lake behind the dam, a dispute broke out between Syria and Iraq (which is downstream) that was settled by intervention from Saudi Arabia and the Soviet Union. The dam was originally built to generate hydroelectric power, as well as irrigate lands on both sides of the Euphrates. The dam has not reached its full potential in either of these objectives.

== Project history ==
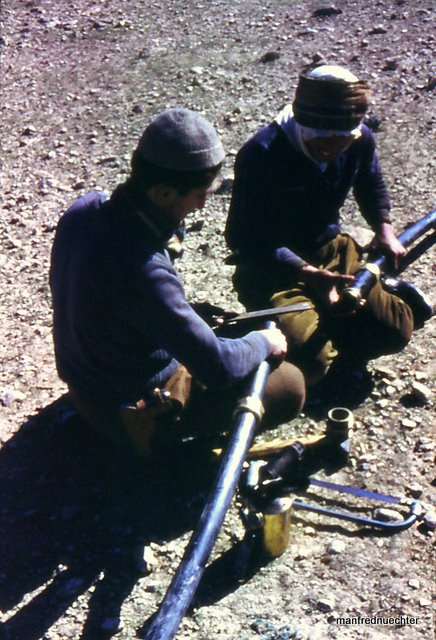
Construction in 1961

In 1927, when Syria was a French mandate, it was proposed to build a dam in the Euphrates near the Syria–Turkey border. After Syria became independent in 1946, the feasibility of the project was studied and shelved. In 1957, the Syrian government reached an agreement with the Soviet Union to build a dam in the Euphrates. In 1960, as part of the United Arab Republic, Syria signed an agreement with West Germany for a financing loan. In 1965, after Syria left the UAR, a new agreement was reached with the Soviet Union. A special government department was created to oversee the construction. In the early 1960s Swedish geomorphologist Åke Sundborg worked as an advisor on the dam project with the task of estimating the amount and fate of sediment entering the dam. Sundborg developed a mathematical model on the projected growth of a river delta in the dam.

Originally, the Euphrates Dam was conceived as a dual-purpose dam. The dam would include a hydroelectric power station with eight turbines capable of producing 880 MW in total, and would irrigate an area of 640,000 hectares (2,500 sq mi) on both sides of the Euphrates. Construction of the dam lasted between 1968 and 1973, while the accompanying power station was finished on 8 March 1978. The dam was constructed during the agricultural reform policies of Hafez al-Assad, who had re-routed the Euphrates river for the dam in 1974. The total cost of the dam was US$340 million of which US$100 million was in the form of a loan by the Soviet Union. The Soviet Union also provided technical expertise. During construction, up to 12,000 Syrians and 900 Russian technicians worked on the dam. They were housed in the greatly expanded town near the construction site, which was subsequently renamed Al-Thawrah (Tabqa). To facilitate the project, as well as the construction of irrigation works on the Khabur River, the national railway system (Syrian Railways) was extended from Aleppo to the dam, Raqqa, Deir ez-Zor, and eventually Qamishli. Around 4,000 Arab families who had been living in the flooded part of the Euphrates Valley were resettled in other parts of northern Syria, part of a partially implemented plan to establish an "Arab belt" along the borders with Turkey and Iraq in order to separate Kurds in Syria from Turkish and Iraqi Kurdistan.

=== Dispute with Iraq ===
In 1974, the authorities started to fill the lake behind the dam by reducing the flow of the Euphrates. Slightly earlier, the Turkish government had started filling the reservoir of the newly constructed Keban Dam, and at the same time the area was hit by significant drought. As a result, Iraq received significantly less water from the Euphrates than normal, and complained that annual Euphrates flow had dropped from 15.3 cubic kilometres (3.7 cu mi) in 1973 to 9.4 cubic kilometres (2.3 cu mi) in 1975. Iraq asked the Arab League to intervene but Syria argued that it received less water from Turkey as well. As a result, tensions rose; both governments sent troops to the Syria-Iraq border, and the Iraqi government threatened to bomb the Tabqa Dam. Before the dispute could escalate any further, an agreement was reached in 1975 after mediation by Saudi Arabia and the Soviet Union, whereby Syria immediately increased the flow from the dam and agreed to let 60 percent of the Euphrates water that came over the Syria-Turkey border flow into Iraq. In 1987, Turkey, Syria and Iraq signed an agreement by which Turkey was committed to maintain an average Euphrates flow of 500 cubic metres (18,000 cu ft) per second into Syria, which translates into 16 cubic kilometres (3.8 cu mi) of water per year.

=== Rescue excavations in the Euphrates Lake region ===
The upper part of the Syrian Euphrates valley has been intensively occupied at least since the Late Natufian period (10,800–9500 BC). Nineteenth- and early twentieth-century European travellers had already noted the presence of numerous archaeological sites in the area that would be flooded by the new reservoir. In order to preserve or at least document as many of these remains as possible, an extensive archaeological rescue programme was initiated during which more than 25 sites were excavated.

Between 1963 and 1965, archaeological sites and remains were located with the help of aerial photographs, and a ground survey was carried out as well to determine the periods that were present at each site. Between 1965 and 1970, foreign archaeological missions carried out systematic excavations at the sites of Mureybet (United States), Tell Qannas (Habuba Kabira) (Belgium), Mumbaqat (Germany), Selenkahiye (Netherlands), and Emar (France). With help from UNESCO, two minarets at Mureybet and Meskene were photogrammetrically measured, and a protective glacis was built around the castle Qal'at Ja'bar. The castle was located on a hilltop that would not be flooded, but the lake would turn it in an island. The castle is now connected to the shore by a causeway.

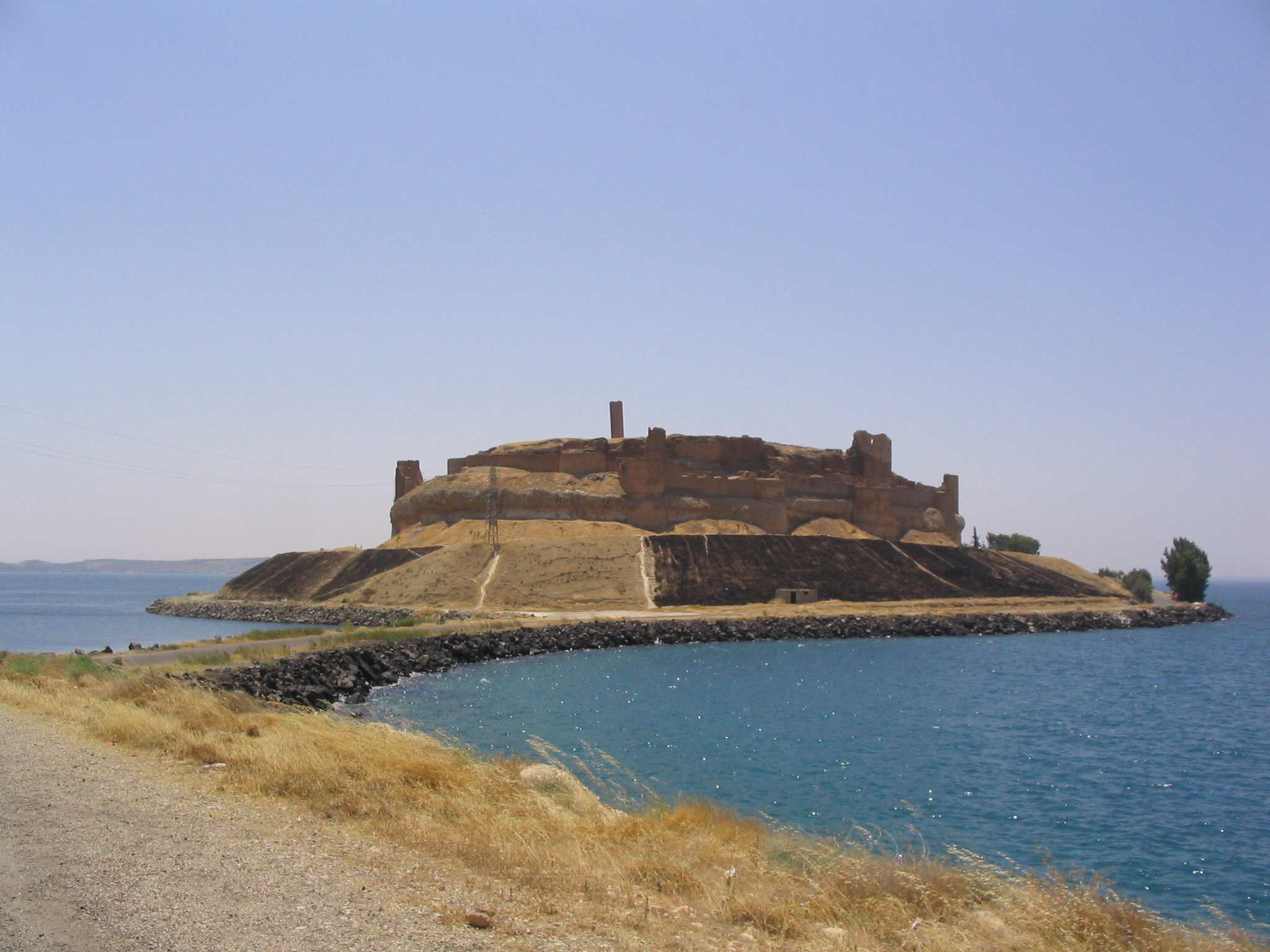
Qal'at Ja'bar surrounded by the waters of Euphrates Lake

In 1971, with support from UNESCO, Syria appealed to the international community to participate in the efforts to salvage as many archaeological remains as possible before the area would disappear under the rising water of Euphrates Lake. To stimulate foreign participation, the Syrian antiquities law was modified so that foreign missions had the right to claim a part of the artefacts that were found during excavation. As a result, between 1971 and 1977, numerous excavations were carried out in the Euphrates Lake area by Syrian as well as foreign missions. Syrian archaeologists worked at the sites of Tell al-'Abd, 'Anab al-Safinah, Tell Sheikh Hassan, Qal'at Ja'bar, Dibsi Faraj and Tell Fray. There were missions from the United States on Tell Hadidi (Azu), Dibsi Faraj, Tell Fray and Shams ed-Din-Tannira; from France on Mureybet and Emar; from Italy on Tell Fray; from the Netherlands on Tell Ta'as, Jebel Aruda and Selenkahiye; from Switzerland on Tell al-Hajj; from Great Britain on Abu Hureyra and Tell es-Sweyhat; and from Japan on Tell Roumeila. In addition, the minarets of Mureybet and Meskene were moved to higher locations, and Qal'at Ja'bar was further reinforced and restored. Many finds from the excavations are now on display in the National Museum of Aleppo, where a special permanent exhibition is devoted to the finds from the Euphrates Lake region.

=== Other dams in the Syrian Euphrates valley ===
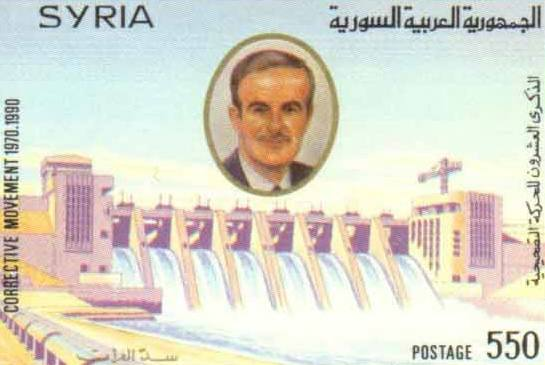
Syrian postage stamp commemorating the 20th anniversary of the Corrective Movement program, launched by Hafez al-Assad in 1970. The postage stamp depicts Assad and the Tabqa Dam

After the completion of the Euphrates Dam, Syria built two more dams in the Euphrates, both of which were functionally related to the Euphrates Dam. The Mansoura Dam, located 18 kilometres (11 mi) downstream from the Tabqa Dam, was completed in 1986 and functions as a floodwater control to manage the irregular output of the Tabqa Dam and as a hydroelectric power station. The Tishrin Dam, which functions primarily as a hydroelectric power station, has been constructed 80 kilometres (50 mi) south from the Syria–Turkey border and filling of the reservoir started in 1999. Its construction was partly motivated by the disappointing performance of the Euphrates Dam. The implementation of a fourth dam between Raqqa and Deir ez-Zor – the Halabiye Dam – was planned in 2009 and an appeal to archaeologists was released to excavate sites that will be flooded by the new reservoir.

=== Recent history ===
On 11 February 2013 the dam was captured by the Syrian opposition in their fight against the government, according to The Syrian Observatory for Human Rights. In 2013, four of the dam's eight turbines were operational and the original staff continued to manage it. Dam workers still received pay from the Syrian Government, and fighting in the area temporarily ceased if repairs were needed. The dam was then captured by the Islamic State of Iraq and the Levant in 2014. SDF efforts to retake parts of the Al-Raqqa and Deir ez-Zor Governorates, including the area immediately surrounding the dam, began in November 2016. Interruptions in power output from the dam due to combat are estimated to have affected up to 40,000 people.

In January 2017 the Euphrates rose 10 meters due to heavy precipitation and flow mismanagement, disrupting transportation and flooding farmland downstream. A nearby raid against ISIL by combined SDF and US special forces also impacted the dam's entrance.

In March 2017, ISIL warned of the dam's imminent collapse after the towers attached to the dam were bombed by an American B-52 bomber during a joint US/SDF operation to capture it on March 26, 2017. The dam had been on a U.S. no-strike list but was struck by three bombs anyway. The bombing caused critical equipment to fail and the dam to stop functioning. One of the bombs, a bunker buster, failed to detonate. An emergency ceasefire between the Islamic State, US forces, and the Syrian government, otherwise sworn enemies, enabled engineers to make emergency repairs to the dam to prevent it from failing while the Turkish authorities coordinated to close the gates of dams upstream in order to prevent overtopping. A US drone strike killed three of the civilian emergency dam workers shortly thereafter. On March 29 a floodgate was opened by emergency workers, causing flooding downstream which displaced approximately 3,000 people. A second floodgate was opened on April 5, mitigating risk of collapse. If the dam had failed major flooding would have extended past Deir ez-Zor, more than 100 miles downstream. SDF forces announced they captured the dam on 10 May 2017.

==== 2026 northeastern Syria offensive ====
The Syrian transitional government launched an operation against the Kurdish-led Syrian Democratic Forces in northeastern Syria. The Syrian Arab News Agency reported that the Syrian Army regained full control of the Euphrates Dam on 18 January, restoring state management of its water and hydroelectric facilities.

== Characteristics of the dam and the reservoir ==
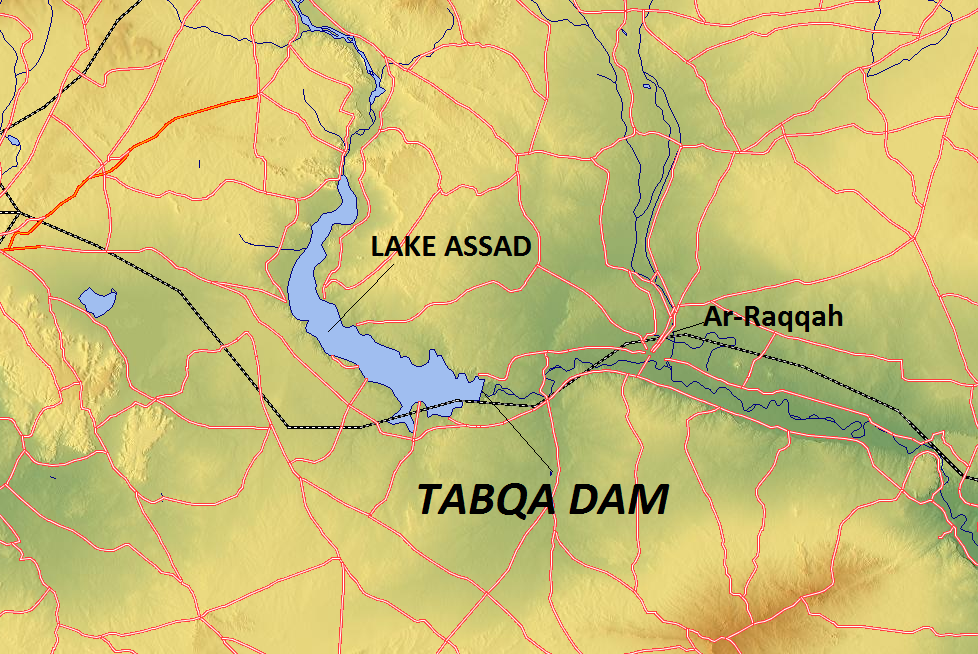
Map of the wider Euphrates Lake region

The Tabqa dam is located on a spot where rocky outcrops on each side of the Euphrates Valley are less than 5 kilometres (3.1 mi) apart. The dam is an earth-fill dam that is 4.5 kilometres (2.8 mi) long, 60 metres (200 ft) high from the riverbed (307 metres (1,007 ft) above sea-level), 512 metres (1,680 ft) wide at its base and 19 metres (62 ft) at the top. The hydroelectric power station is located on the southern end of the dam and contains eight Kaplan turbines. The turbines' rotation speed is 125 RPM, and they can potentially generate 103 MW each. Euphrates Lake is 80 kilometres (50 mi) long and on average 8 kilometres (5.0 mi) wide. The reservoir can potentially hold 11.7 cubic kilometres (2.8 cu mi) of water, at which size its surface area would be 610 square kilometres (240 sq mi). Annual evaporation is 1.3 cubic kilometres (0.31 cu mi) due to the high average summer temperature in northern Syria. This is high compared to reservoirs upstream from Euphrates Lake. For example, the evaporation at Keban Dam Lake is 0.48 cubic kilometres (0.12 cu mi) per year at roughly the same surface area.

Neither the Tabqa Dam nor Euphrates Lake is currently used to its full economic potential. Although the lake can potentially hold 11.7 cubic kilometres (2.8 cu mi), actual capacity is 9.6 cubic kilometres (2.3 cu mi), with a surface area of 447 square kilometres (173 sq mi). The proposed irrigation scheme suffered from a number of problems, including the high gypsum content in the reclaimed soils around Euphrates Lake, soil salinization, the collapse of canals that distributed the water from Euphrates Lake, and the unwillingness of farmers to resettle in the reclaimed areas. As a result, only 60,000 hectares (230 sq mi) were irrigated from Euphrates Lake in 1984. In 2000, the irrigated surface had risen to 124,000 hectares (480 sq mi), which is 19 percent of the projected 640,000 hectares (2,500 sq mi). Due to lower than expected water flow from Turkey, as well as lack of maintenance, the dam generates only 150 MW instead of 800 MW. Euphrates Lake is the most important source of drinking water to Aleppo, providing the city through a pipeline with 0.08 cubic kilometres (0.019 cu mi) of drinking water per year. The lake also supports a fishing industry.

=== Environmental effects ===
Research indicates that the salinity of the Euphrates water in Iraq has increased considerably since the nearly simultaneous construction of the Keban Dam in Turkey and the Tabqa Dam in Syria. This increase can, among other things, be related to the lower discharge of the Euphrates as a result of the construction of the Keban Dam and the dams of the Southeastern Anatolia Project (GAP) in Turkey, and to a lesser degree of the Tabqa Dam in Syria. High-salinity water is less useful for domestic and irrigation purposes.

The shore of the lake has developed into an important marshland area. On the southeastern shore, some areas have been reforested with evergreen trees including the Aleppo pine and the Euphrates poplar. Euphrates Lake is an important wintering location for migratory birds and the government has undertaken measures to protect small areas along the shores of Euphrates Lake from hunters by downgrading access roads. The island of Jazirat al-Thawra has been designated a nature reserve.

== See also ==
- Water resources management in Syria
- Mansoura Dam
- Film Essay on the Euphrates Dam
- A Flood in Baath Country
