= Michel Seurat =

French sociologist (1947–1986)

Michel Seurat was a sociologist and researcher at the CNRS, born 14 August 1947 in Tunisia and died in Beirut in 1986.

He was kidnapped on 22 May 1985, in Lebanon, by the Islamic Jihad Organization, a Lebanese terrorist organization that was the precursor to Hezbollah. Unlike his cellmate Jean-Paul Kauffmann, also kidnapped the same day, he was not released. On 5 March 1986 Islamic Jihad stated that it had executed Seurat; however, his fellow hostages revealed on their release that Seurat had died of hepatitis. In October 2005, the remains of Michel Seurat were found in the southern suburbs of Beirut by construction workers, and were formally identified after DNA testing. His wife is the Syrian novelist Marie Seurat.
