= Everyday Life in a Syrian Village =

Everyday Life in a Syrian Village الحياة اليومية في قرية سورية
- Directed by: Omar Amiralay
- Written by: Saadallah Wannous & Omar Amiralay
- Produced by: General Organization for Cinema (Syria)
- Cinematography: Hazem Bayaa; Abdo Hamzeh
- Edited by: Qais al-Zubaidi
- Distributed by: General Organization for Cinema (Syria)
- Release date: 1974
- Running time: 80 minutes
- Country: Syria
- Languages: Arabic, French and English subtitles

Everyday Life in a Syrian Village (Arabic: الحياة اليومية في قرية سورية) is a Syrian documentary film by the director Omar Amiralay. The film was ranked #55 on the Dubai International Film Festival's 2013 list of the top 100 Arab films.

== Awards ==
- Berlin International Film Festival - Interfilm Award - Otto Dibelius Film Award, 1976.
- Prix spécial du Jury - Festival de Toulon, 1976.
