= Euphrates Lake =

Reservoir on the Euphrates River

- بحيرة الفرات (Arabic)
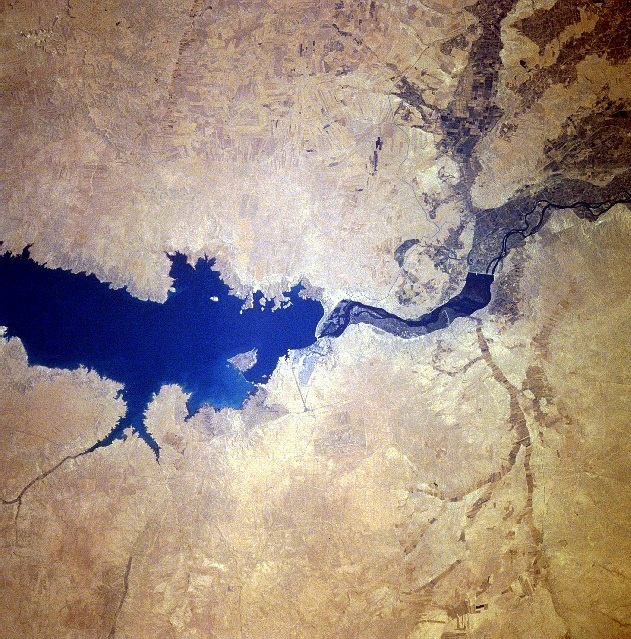
- Euphrates Lake (left), Euphrates Dam (centre), and Mansoura Dam (right). The photo was taken on STS-78, June 1996. North is in the upper left corner of the image.

- Location within Syria
- Interactive map of Euphrates Lake
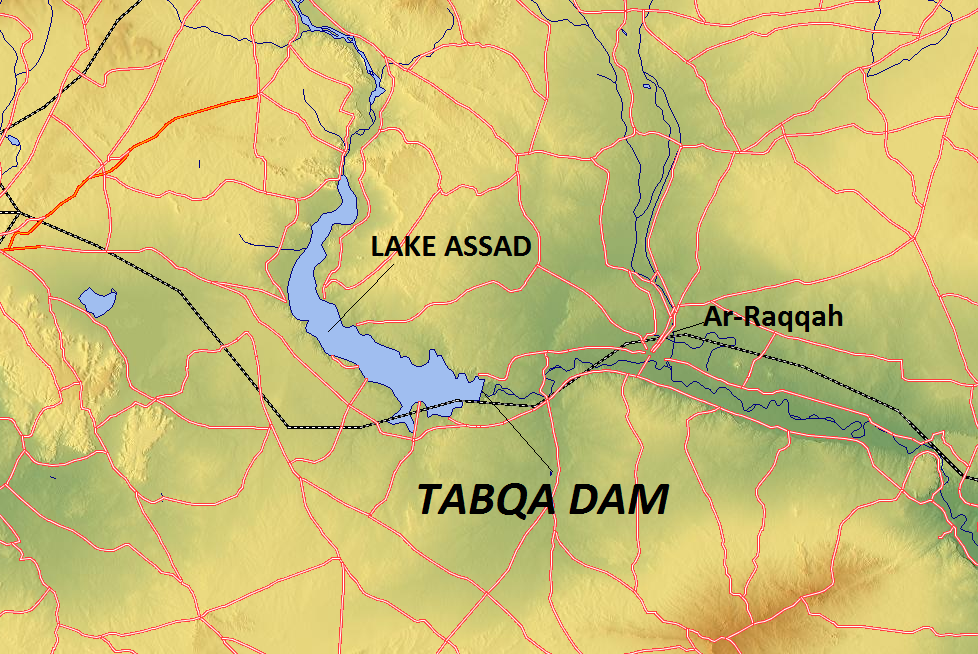
- Map of the wider Lake Euphrates region
- Location: Raqqa Governorate
- Coordinates: 36°00′N 38°10′E
- Type: reservoir
- Primary inflows: Euphrates
- Primary outflows: Euphrates
- Basin countries: Syria
- Built: 1968
- First flooded: 1974
- Max. length: 80 km (50 mi)
- Max. width: 8 km (5 mi)
- Surface area: 525 km^{2} (203 sq mi)
- Water volume: 10 km^{3} (2.4 cu mi)
- Islands: Jazirat al-Tabqah
- Settlements: Al-Tabqah

Euphrates Lake (Arabic: بحيرة الفرات, romanized: Buḥayrat al-Furāt), also known as Lake Tabqa, (Note: Arabic: بحيرة الطبقة, romanized: Buḥayrat al-Ṭabaqah) and formerly known as Lake Assad, (Note: Arabic: بحيرة الأسد, romanized: Buḥayrat al-Asad) is a reservoir on the Euphrates in Raqqa Governorate, Syria. It was created in 1974 when construction of the Euphrates Dam was completed. Euphrates Lake is Syria's largest lake, with a maximum capacity of 11.7 cubic kilometres (2.8 cu mi) and a maximum surface area of 525 square kilometres (203 sq mi). A vast network of canals uses water from Euphrates Lake to irrigate lands on both sides of the Euphrates. In addition, the lake provides drinking water for the city of Aleppo and supports a fishing industry. The shores of Euphrates Lake have developed into important ecological zones.

== Project history ==
The first plans for a dam in the Syrian part of the Euphrates date to 1927, but these were not carried out. In 1957, an agreement was reached with the Soviet Union for technical and financial aid for the construction of a dam in the Euphrates, and in 1960 a financial agreement was signed with West Germany. Another agreement to finance the project was signed with the Soviet Union in 1965. The project included a hydroelectric power station in the Tabqa Dam, and the construction of a vast irrigation network capable of irrigating 640,000 hectares (2,500 sq mi) of land on both sides of the Euphrates. Construction of the dam lasted between 1968 and 1973 and the flooding of the reservoir commenced in 1974 by reducing the flow of the Euphrates. The project was completed under the presidency of Hafez al-Assad as part of his modernization policies and agricultural reforms. In 1975, Iraq complained that the flow of the Euphrates had been reduced below an acceptable level and threatened to bomb the Tabqa Dam; mediation by Saudi Arabia and the Soviet Union eventually settled this dispute.

=== Rescue excavations in the Euphrates Lake region ===
In anticipation of the reservoir forming, an intensive, international program of archaeological rescue excavations was carried out between 1963 and 1974. Excavations ranged in the date of sites: from the Late Natufian to the Ottoman Empire. Excavated sites include Tell Abu Hureyra, Emar, Habuba Kabira, Mureybet, Tell es-Sweyhat, Tell Fray and Dibsi Faraj. At Qal'at Ja'bar, a castle on a hilltop later turned into an island, a protective glacis was built and two minarets at Mureybet and Meskene were relocated beyond the flood zone.

== Characteristics ==
The maximum capacity of Euphrates Lake is 11.7 cubic kilometres (2.8 cu mi) at a surface area of 610 square kilometres (240 sq mi), making it the largest lake in Syria. The actual capacity is, however, much lower at 9.6 cubic kilometres (2.3 cu mi), resulting in a surface area of 447 square kilometres (173 sq mi). The proposed irrigation scheme suffered from a number of problems, including the high gypsum content in the reclaimed soils around Euphrates Lake, soil salinization, the collapse of canals that distributed the water from Euphrates Lake, and the unwillingness of farmers to resettle in the reclaimed areas. As a result, only 60,000 hectares (230 sq mi) were irrigated from Euphrates Lake in 1984. In 2000, the irrigated surface had risen to 124,000 hectares (480 sq mi), which is 19 percent of the projected 640,000 hectares (2,500 sq mi). Euphrates Lake is the most important source of drinking water to Aleppo, providing the city through a pipeline with 80,000,000 cubic metres (2.8×10^{9} cu ft) of drinking water per year. The lake also supports a fishing industry.

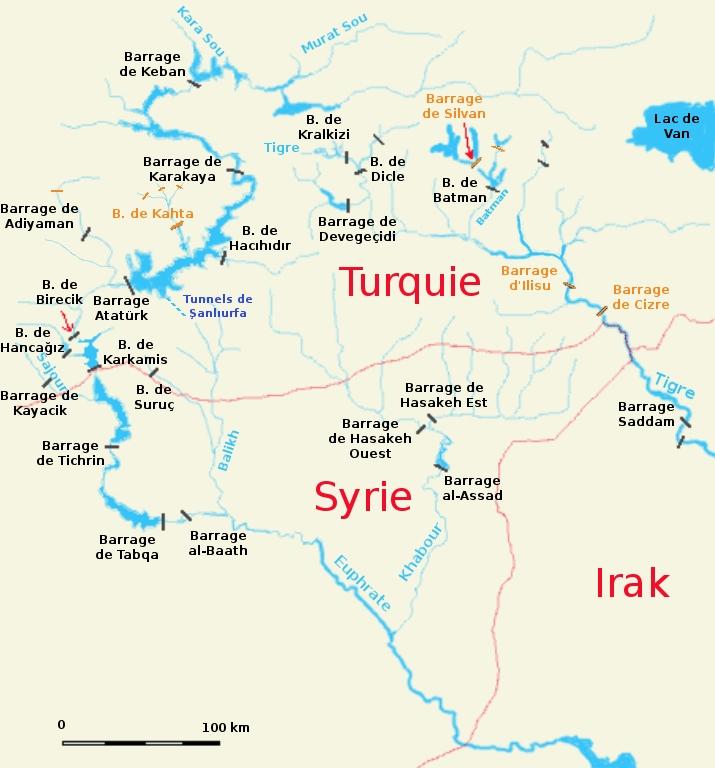
Map (in French) of the Syro–Turkish part of the Euphrates basin showing the location of the Euphrates Dam and Euphrates Lake directly west of it

The western shore of the lake has developed into an important marshland area. On the southeastern shore, some areas have been reforested with evergreen trees including the Aleppo pine and the Euphrates poplar. Euphrates Lake is an important wintering location for migratory birds and the government before 2004 undertook measures to protect certain shore areas from hunters by downgrading access roads. The island of Jazirat al-Thawra has been designated a nature reserve.

During the Syrian Civil War, water levels in Euphrates Lake have dropped significantly. This drop is possibly caused by the power station of the Tabqa Dam, which pumps more water out of the lake than is supplied by the Euphrates.

In May 2026, the lake has reported water levels the height of which have not been seen for decades, reaching 97%. These record-breaking levels have caused flooding further down the river in the Raqqa and Deir ez-Zour governorates.

== See also ==
- Mansoura Dam
- Tishrin Dam
- Water resources management in Syria
