= List of Syrian television series =

This is a list of Syrian television series.

== 1960s ==
- The happy vacation (1960)
- Bubbles (1963)
- Mokhtar alsaba' bahrat (1969)
- Face to face

== 1970s ==
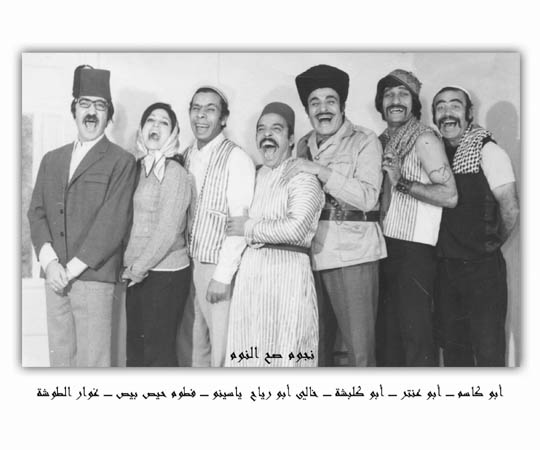
Sah Al-Noom cast in the second season.

- Sah Al-Noom

== 1980s ==
- Maraya

== 1990s ==
- Al-Ababeed
- Al Maout Al Kadem Ila Al Sharq
- Nihayat Rajol Shoja' (1994; adapted from the novel)

== 2000s ==
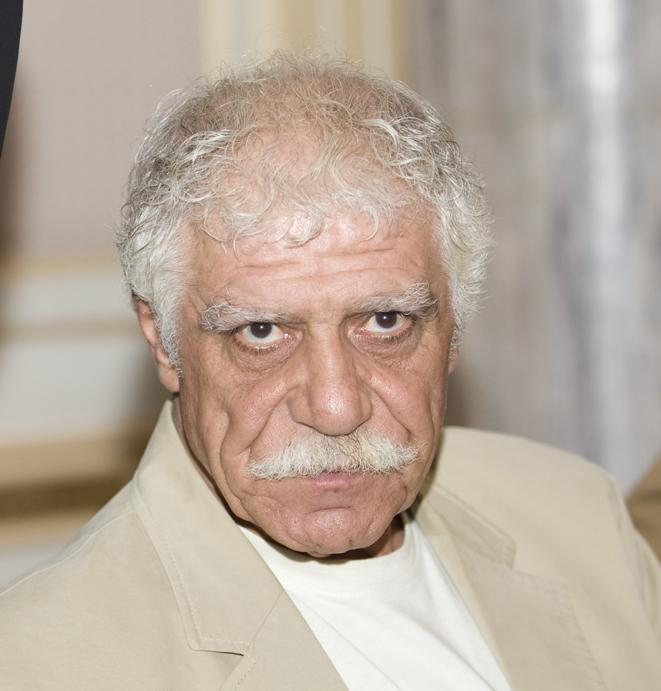
Khaled Taja

- Al-Taghreba al-Falastenya
- Old Times
- Ash-Shatat
- Saqf al-Alam
- Salah Al-deen Al-Ayyobi
- Bab Al-Hara
- Seraa Ala El Remal
- Zaman Al'ar
- De'ah Da'iah
- Saqr Qoraish
- Rabee' Qortoba
- Mulouk Al-Tawa'ef
- Al-Zeer Salem

== 2010s ==
- Mawqef Micro
- Forbidden Love
