= Khaled Taja =

Syrian actor (1939–2012)

- خالد تاجا
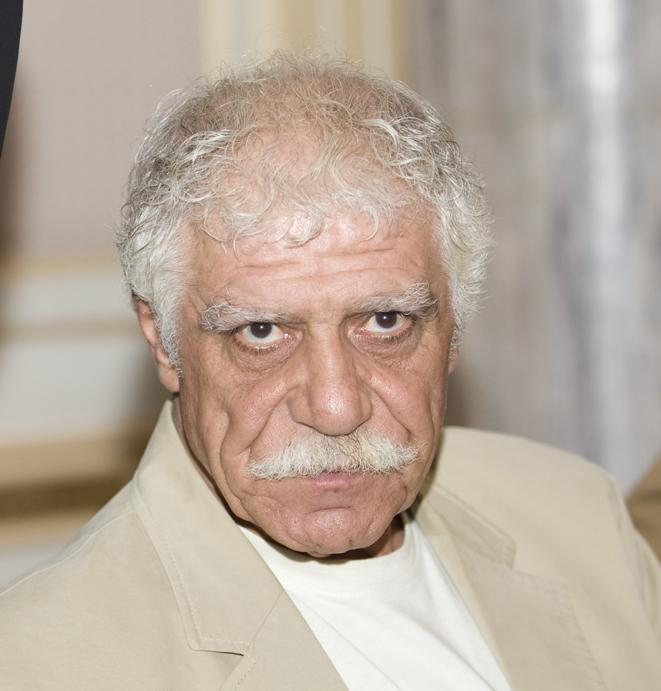
- Born: 6 November 1939; Rukneddine, Damascus, Syria
- Died: 4 April 2012 (aged 72); Damascus, Syria
- Years active: 1966–2012
- Known for: TV series, Movies
- Notable work: Al-Taghreba al-Falastenya

Khaled Omar Taja (Arabic: خالد عمر تاجا; 6 November 1939 – 4 April 2012) was a Syrian actor born in the Rukneddine district of the city of Damascus. He appeared in several films including Memory of a Night of Love (1973). Taja worked in over 62 different TV series. Taja was among 99 intellectuals who published a declaration from Beirut in September 2000, two months following Bashar's accession to the presidency, advocating for the establishment of freedom of expression, the lifting of the state of emergency, and political pluralism.

He died at the age of 72 on 4 April 2012.

== Career and filmography ==
=== Cinema ===
- 1973 – Memory of a Night of Love

=== TV series ===
- 2000 – Al-Zeer Salem
- 2001 – Salah Al-deen Al-Ayyobi
- 2004 – Al-Taghriba Al-Filistinia
- - Saqr Quraish

== Awards ==
- Khaled Taja won the Best Actor Award for a Second Role for his performance in the Palestinian TV series Al-Taghreba al-Falastenya, at the Cairo Festival for Radio and Television, 2005.

== See also ==
- Jay Abdo
- Maxim Khalil
- Ghassan Massoud
- Hatem Ali
- List of Syrian television series
