= Maha Al-Saleh =

Syrian actress (1945–2008)

- Born: April 10, 1945; Jableh, Syria
- Died: June 14, 2008 (aged 63); Damascus, Syria
- Occupation: Actress & Director

Maha Al-Saleh (Arabic: مها الصالح; 1945–2008) was a Syrian actress and director, her career began in the early 1960s.

== Early life ==
Born in Jableh, Latakia, she belonged to an Alawite family.

== Career ==
She started her career in 1963 with the Syrian Television's Dramatic Arts Group. Later, she became an actress and director, specializing in monodrama, at the Syrian National Theater.

She won awards internationally like the Lady with the Dog Award in Moscow and the Best Actress Award at the Mediterranean Festival in Italy.

== Personal life ==
She married Assaad Feddah and they had a son named Majd. She is the sister-in-law of poets Muhammad al-Maghut and Adunis.

She died in Damascus at the age of 63.

== Filmography ==
- The 6 O'Clock Operation (1970)
- The Palace Alley (1970)
- The Children of My Country (1971)
- The World in 2000 (1972)
- Memory of a Night of Love (1973)
- The Corrupters on Earth (1973)
- One Man Wanted (1973)
- Girls for Love (1974)
- The Shame (1974)
- The Game of Life (1975)
- No Time for Deception (1975)
- Beauty and the Four Eyes (1975)
- My Love Is Very Crazy (1975)
- The Steadfast Man (1975)
- Hunting Men (1976)
- The Second Story from the Biography of Bani Hilal: The Green Princess (1978)
- The Third Story from the Biography of Bani Hilal: The Adventure of Princess Al-Shama (1978)
- A Knight from the South (1979)
- Ramadan Kareem (1979)
- Four Years' War (1980)
- Fingerprints on the Wall of Time (1980)
- The Excellent (1982)
- Wounds (1986)
- A Woman Who Doesn't Know Despair (1987)
- The Absent-Mind Sabhan (1991)
- Warm Hearts (1989)
- Karaday Bahloul (1990)
- The Absent-Mind Sabhan (1991)
- Kamel's Father 1 (1991)
- Kamel's Father 2 (1993)
- Retribution (1996)
- El Awsaj (1997)
- Ayoub the Sea (1998)
- Pomegranate Blooms (2001)
- The Black Flour (2001)
- Imru' Al Qais: The Bitter Revenge (2002)
- The Finish Line (2003)
- A stinging sermon against a sitting man (2004)
