= Nesreen Tafesh =

Palestinian-Syrian actress

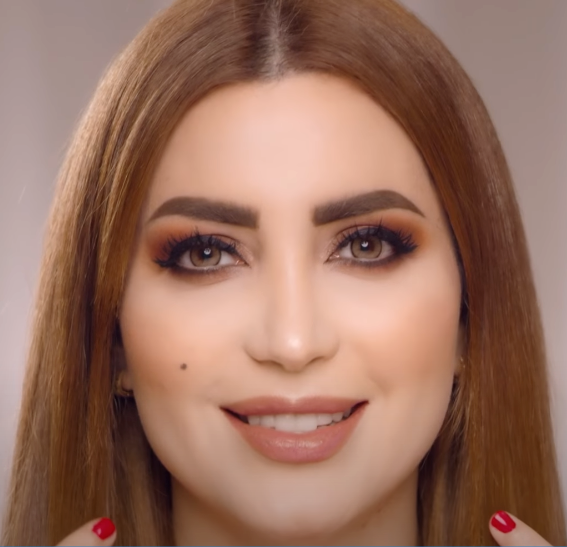
- Tafesh in 2019
- Born: Nesreen Yousef Mohammed Tafesh نسرين يوسف محمد طافش; February 15, 1982 (age 44); Aleppo, Syria
- Occupations: Actress, singer
- Years active: 2002–present
- Website: nesreentafesh.com

Nesreen Tafesh (Arabic: نسرين طافش; born February 15, 1982) is an Algerian-Palestinian actress and singer born in Syria.

== Early life ==
Nesreen was born in Aleppo, Syria to the Palestinian poet and author Yousef Tafesh from Safed and an Algerian mother. She has seven sisters and her maternal grandmother is of Moroccan descent.

She graduated from the Higher Institute for Dramatic Arts in Damascus in 2008. Nesreen is considered a Syrian actress, yet she only has Algerian nationality.

== Career ==
Nesreen's first act ever was in a biography series about Hulagu Khan when she was still studying at the Higher Institute for Dramatic Arts. Afterward, she worked in the series (Arabic: ربيع قرطبة, lit. 'Córdoba's Spring'), playing the lead female role of Subh, wife of Caliph Al-Hakam II. The work was written by Walid Saif. In 2017, she started singing by releasing the single "Metghayar Alayi".

She used to live in Dubai, United Arab Emirates, before she moved to Egypt in late 2018, in which she acted in the film (Arabic: نادي الرجال السري, lit. 'The Secret Men Club').

== Personal life ==
While still in college, Tafesh was briefly engaged to the Syrian movie and TV director of Palestinian origin, Al-Mothanna Sobah. She was later married to an Emirati businessman from 2008 to 2013. In November 2020, she disclosed her engagement; however, no marriage materialized.

In July 2022, she announced her marriage with Egyptian energy healer Sherif Sharkawy; however, the marriage only lasted for five months. The couple reunited in April 2023, but parted ways again by July of the same year.

In January 2025, she revealed that she had married Egyptian jewelry businessman Ahmed Johar, marking her third marriage.

== Controversy ==
In 2014, Dima Bayaa, actress and co-worker at Sabaya, exposed Tafesh's affair with her ex-husband Taim Hasan, calling her a "homewrecker." This led to a lawsuit, and Dima was fined $1,300 by a Dubai court for defamation.

On January 30, 2023, the Public Prosecution assigned Tafesh to the Sheikh Zayed District Office of Giza Governorate for issuing a bad check worth LE4 million. In October of that year, the Misdemeanor Court of the South Giza Court upheld the initial verdict of a three-year jail sentence, rejecting her appeal. On May 8, 2024, Tafesh managed to settle the dispute by paying the entire amount in cash.

== Filmography ==
=== TV Series ===
- Hulagu (2002)
- Rabea Cordoba (Córdoba's Spring) (2003)
- al-Taghreba al-Falastenya (The Palestinian alienation) (2004)
- Rijal taht altarbush (Men under Tarboosh) (2004)
- Ahlam Kabira (Big Dreams) (2004)
- Ala Tool al-Ayam (Along the days) (2006)
- Al Intizar (Waiting) (2006)
- Ahl al-Gharam (People of love) (2006)
- Sabaya (2009)
- Fengan El Dam (A cup of blood) (2009)
- Bok'et Dao'e (Spotlight) (2010)
- Alsarab (The mirage) (2011)
- Jalasat Nisa'iya (Women's sessions) (2011)
- Banat El-Aela (Family girls) (2012)
- Tahaluf alsabar (Cactus Alliance) (2014)
- Halawet Elrouh (Soul's sweetness) (2014)
- Fee Zoroof Ghameda (In mysterious circumstances) (2015)
- Alarrab (The Godfather) (2015)
- Al Ekhwa (The Brothers) (2015)
- Alf laylat walayla (A Thousand and One Nights) (2015)
- Al Tawarid (The Expelled) (2016)
- Shouq (Longing) (2017)
- Aloqab wa Alafra' (The Eagle and Al Afra) (2017)
- Shababeek (Windows) (2017)
- Maqamat El-Ishq (Love stations) (2019)
- Khatam alnamr (Tiger seal) (2020)
- Alwajh alakhar (The other face) (2020)
- Jawqat Aziza (Aziza choir) (2022)

=== Films ===
- Nadi El-Regal El-Serri (The Secret Men Club) (2019)
- Amwal Amma (Public funds) (2020)
- El Dashash (2025)

== Discography ==
=== Albums ===
- El Helwa (2019)

=== Singles and Music videos ===
Year	Title	Album	Video Clip Director
2017	Metghayar Alayi	N/A	
2017	123 Habibi	N/A	
2018	Elaa Maak	N/A	
2019	Areed Artah	N/A	Said El Marouk
2019	Shouqi	N/A	

== General references ==
- "Artists of Palestinian Origin: Nisreen Tafesh". alwatanvoice.com (in Arabic). Donia Al-Watan. December 12, 2013.
