= Jamil Awad =

Jordanian actor (1937–2021)

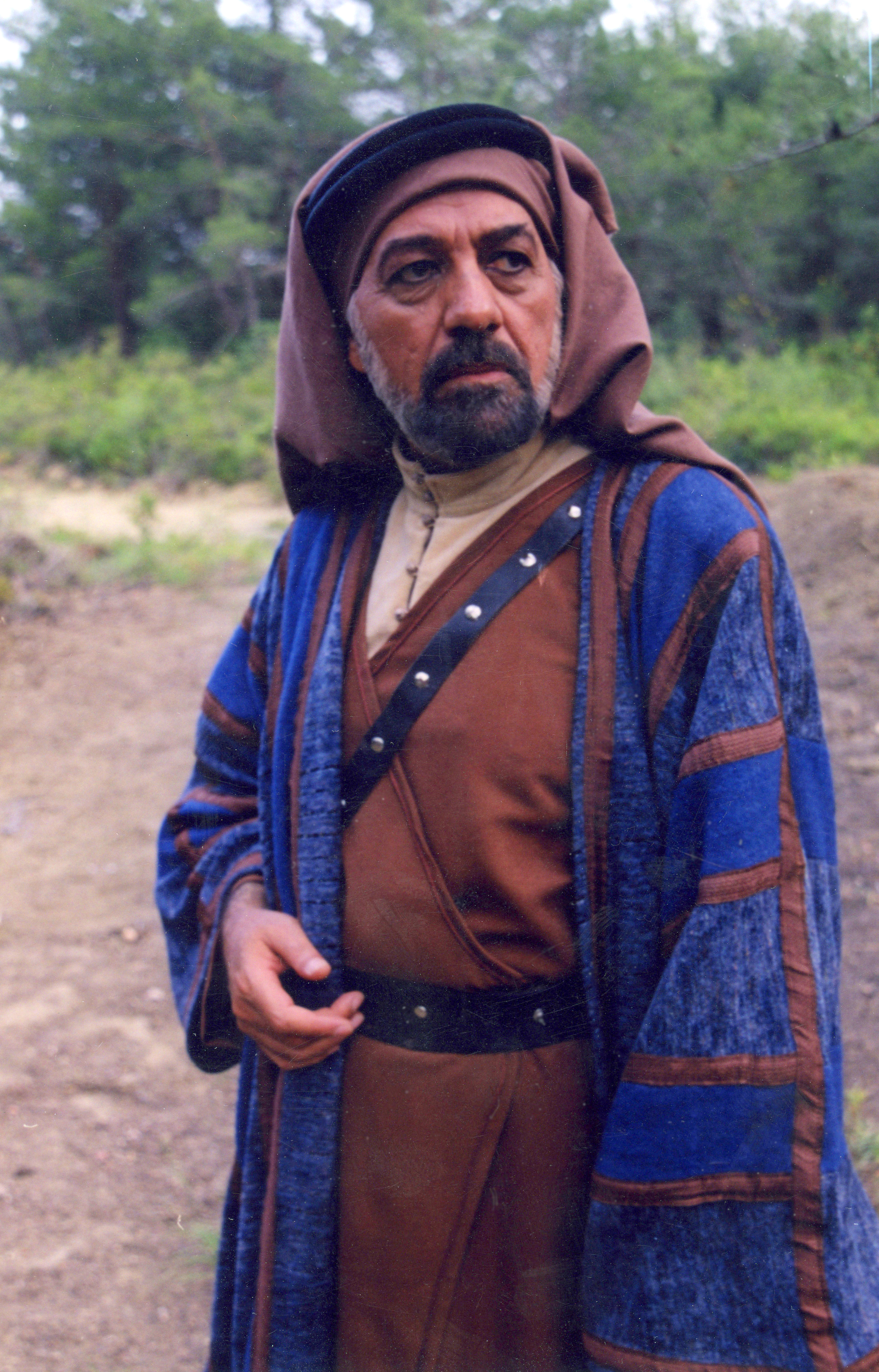
- Born: 28 April 1937
- Died: 28 October 2021 (aged 84)
- Occupations: Actor, writer and director

Jamil Awad (28 April 1937 – 28 October 2021) was a Jordanian actor, writer and director.

== Biography ==
Awad was born to a Jordanian father and a Lebanese mother. He studied interior design and started working for Jordan TV since its opening in 1968. He participated in many national, historical and social television series. He was married to actress Juliet Awwad.

== Death ==
Awad died of kidney failure on 28 October 2021, at the age of 84.

== Partial filmography ==
- Al-Qarar As-Sa’ab (2017)
- Al-Dam'a Al-Hamra'a (2016)
- Hanaya Al-Ghaith (2015)
- Thahab wa Awda (2015)
- Ru'ood Al-Mazn (2014)
- The Last Cavalier (2013)
- Abwab Al-Ghaim (2009)
- Al-Taghreba al-Falastenya (2004)
- Al-Bahth Ann Saladin (2001)
- Al-Manseyyah (2000)
- Qamar wa Sahar (1998)
- Khutuwat nahowa al mustahil (1988)
