= Memory of a Night of Love =

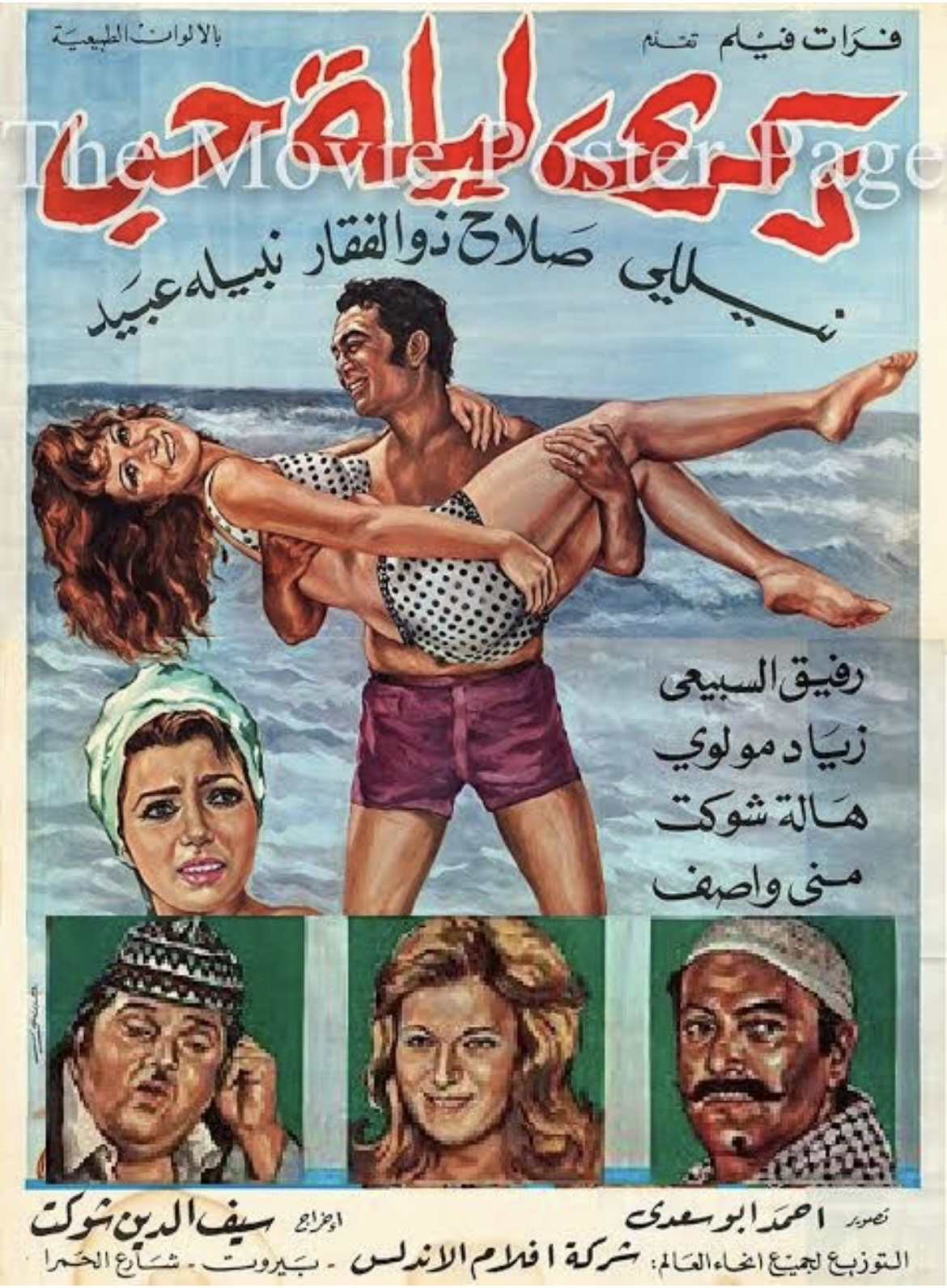
- Film poster
- Arabic: ذكري ليلة حب
- Directed by: Seif El-Dine Chawkat
- Written by: Seif El-Dine Chawkat
- Produced by: Khaled El-Gozzi
- Starring: Salah Zulfikar; Nelly; Nabila Ebeid
- Cinematography: Ahmed Abu Saeda
- Edited by: Saheb Haddad
- Music by: Suhail Arafa
- Production company: Al-Furat for Cinema
- Distributed by: Lebanese Andalusian Films (Abbas Nasser - Sobhi Al-Nouri)
- Release dates: 3 January 1973 (Beirut, Lebanon)
- Running time: 115 minutes
- Countries: Egypt; Syria
- Language: Arabic

Memory of a Night of Love (Arabic: ذكري ليلة حب, French: Souvenir d'une Nuit d'Amour, translit: Thikra Laylat Houbb or Zekra Lailat Hubb) is a 1973 film starring Salah Zulfikar, Nelly and Nabila Ebeid. It is written and directed by Seif El-Dine Chawkat.

== Plot ==
On the outskirts of Beirut, Anwar lives happily with his heart-sick wife, Laila, and one day meets his ex-girlfriend Camelia, who works as a dancer. About Anwar and others, the wife is shocked, and Anwar is arrested. Will his friend the police officer find the real killer?

== Crew ==
- Writer: Seif El-Dine Chawkat
- Director: Seif El-Dine Chawkat
- Produced by: Al Furat for Cinema
- Distribution: Lebanese Andalusian Films (Abbas Nasser - Sobhi Al-Nouri)
- Soundtrack: Suhail Arafa
- Cinematographer: Ahmed Abu Saeda
- Editor: Saheb Haddad

== Cast ==
- Salah Zulfikar as Anwar Kayali
- Nelly as Laila
- Nabila Ebeid as Camellia
- Rafiq Subaie as Abu Sayyah
- Ziad Mawlawi as Abdo
- Mariam Fakhr Eddine as (Guest appearance)
- Muna Wassef as Baheeja
- Hala Shawkat
- Khaled Taja
- Huda Shaarawy
- Nadia Arslan
- Maha Al-Saleh
- Anwar Al-Baba
- Ahmed Addas
- Youssef Choueiri
- Sabah Obaid
- Shakir Barikhan
- Mohammed Al-Shamat
- Ahmed Rafee
- Hisham Al-Masry
- Adeeb Shehadeh
- Adnan Ajlouni
- Mohamed Tariqi
- Ziad Al-Qirbi
- Khaled Abu Saada

== See also ==
- Arab cinema
- Salah Zulfikar filmography
