= Layali Ibn Awa =

Layali ibn awa ليالي ابن آوى
- Directed by: Abdellatif Abdelhamid
- Written by: Abdellatif Abdelhamid (novel)
- Cinematography: General Organization Cinema
- Release date: 1988
- Running time: 105 minutes
- Country: Syria
- Language: Arabic

Layali ibn awa (Arabic: ليالي ابن آوى, lit. 'Nights of the Jackal') is a Syrian film directed by Abdellatif Abdelhamid and produced by the General Organization Cinema in Syria. The film was released in 1988.

== Cast ==
- Assaad Feddah - Abu Kamel
- Najah Abdullah - Um Kamel
- Muhsen Ghazi - Kamal
- Bassam Kousa - Talal
- Tulay Haroun - Dalal
