= Zaman Al'ar =

Syrian Drama

Zaman Al'ar (Arabic: زمن العار, lit. 'The Time of Disgrace') is a Syrian drama that aired during the Ramadan season of 2009, starring Sulafa Memar, Taim Hasan, Bassam Kousa, Muna Wassef and Khaled Taja among many other Syrian actors. The series was created by Hassan Sami Yusuf and directed by Rasha Shurbatji. It discussed the concepts of honor, disgrace, and shame in Arab societies, specifically in the Syrian middle class. The drama also primarily discussed the topic of Customary Marriage and linked this concept to virginity and the issues women face when the enter such marriage.

== Plot ==
The series revolves around Buthaina, an inexperienced woman over the age of thirty, who has dedicated her youth to serving her chronically ill mother, who was kept in bed for 11 years. Buthaina's dedication to her mother's care caused her isolation from the outside world and deprived her of her femininity and the fulfillment of her dreams as a woman in obtaining a husband, home and family. She suddenly finds herself in front of Jamil, the husband of her only friend Sabah, and her outlet to society, who ignites her feelings and sparks her forgotten femininity. Jamil actively pursues Buthaina and persuades her to secretly marry him without the knowledge of her family or his. Their secret marriage is only customary and not official; therefore, it is not recognized by the state or the society as it is Nikah 'urfi. Buthaina's innocence is challenged when she finds herself in a dilemma when Jamil asks her to consummate their marriage. Buthaina reluctantly agrees and loses her virginity and subsequently becomes pregnant only to find herself facing her society and a set of values and concepts that criminalize her act; especially since she burnt and destroyed both copies of her "marriage contract" before finding out that she is pregnant.

== See also ==
- List of Syrian television series
