= Al-Taghriba Al-Filistinia =

Syrian television series

- Arabic: التغريبة الفلسطينية
- Genre: Historical drama
- Written by: Walid Saif
- Screenplay by: Walid Saif
- Story by: Walid Saif
- Directed by: Hatem Ali
- Narrated by: Taim Hasan
- Countries of origin: Syria; Jordan; Palestine
- Original language: Arabic
- No. of seasons: 1
- No. of episodes: 31

Production
- Production location: Syria
- Production company: Syrian Art Production International

Original release
- Release: October 15 – November 14, 2004

Al-Taghriba Al-Filistinia (Arabic: التغريبة الفلسطينية, lit. 'The Palestinian Alienation') is a 2004 Syrian historical drama television series produced by Syrian Art Production International. The series was shot entirely in Syria. The series is a dramatic epic focused on a poor Palestinian family suffering under British rule in Mandatory Palestine, and then under massacres by Zionist militia groups between 1933 and 1967. The story takes place in an unnamed Palestinian village.

The series was written by Walid Saif and directed by Hatem Ali, both of whom lived through the experiences of occupation, war, and displacement. This series marks their fourth consecutive collaboration with the same production company, following Salah al-Din al-Ayyubi, Saqr Quraysh, and Spring of Córdoba.

== Narrative ==
The series follows a poor rural Palestinian family struggling to survive under the British Mandate, during the Great Palestinian Revolt, and later in a refugee camp after the Nakba. Through the family’s experiences, the narrative captures a crucial period in Palestinian history, spanning from the 1933 to 1968 and culminating in the Six-Day War in June 1967. It highlights the family's resilience in the face of war and loss, while portraying their suffering in a way that closely reflects reality.

Beyond recounting historical events, the series presents the diversity of Palestinian society, depicting peasants, workers, poets, intellectuals, revolutionaries, feudal elites, and those who betray their homeland. The Palestinian village itself remains unnamed throughout the series and is introduced simply as “a Palestinian village,” emphasizing the universality of the experience and the collective nature of resistance. From the outset, the writer aimed to shed light on the many unknown Palestinian fighters and revolutionaries who devoted their lives to the struggle for liberation.

Because the series spans long periods of time and numerous events, a narrator is used to condense the story. The narrator, Ali, delivers the only instance of Modern Standard Arabic in the series.

== Cast ==
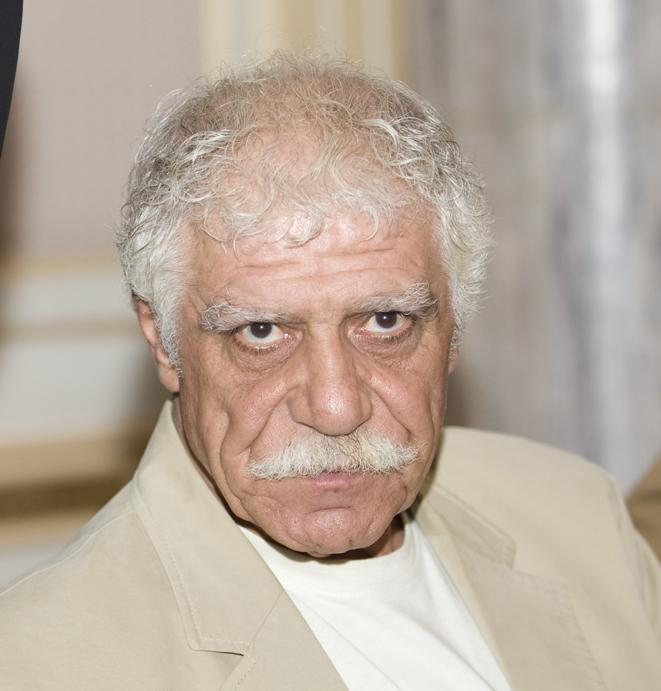
Khaled Taja
(Abu Ahmad)

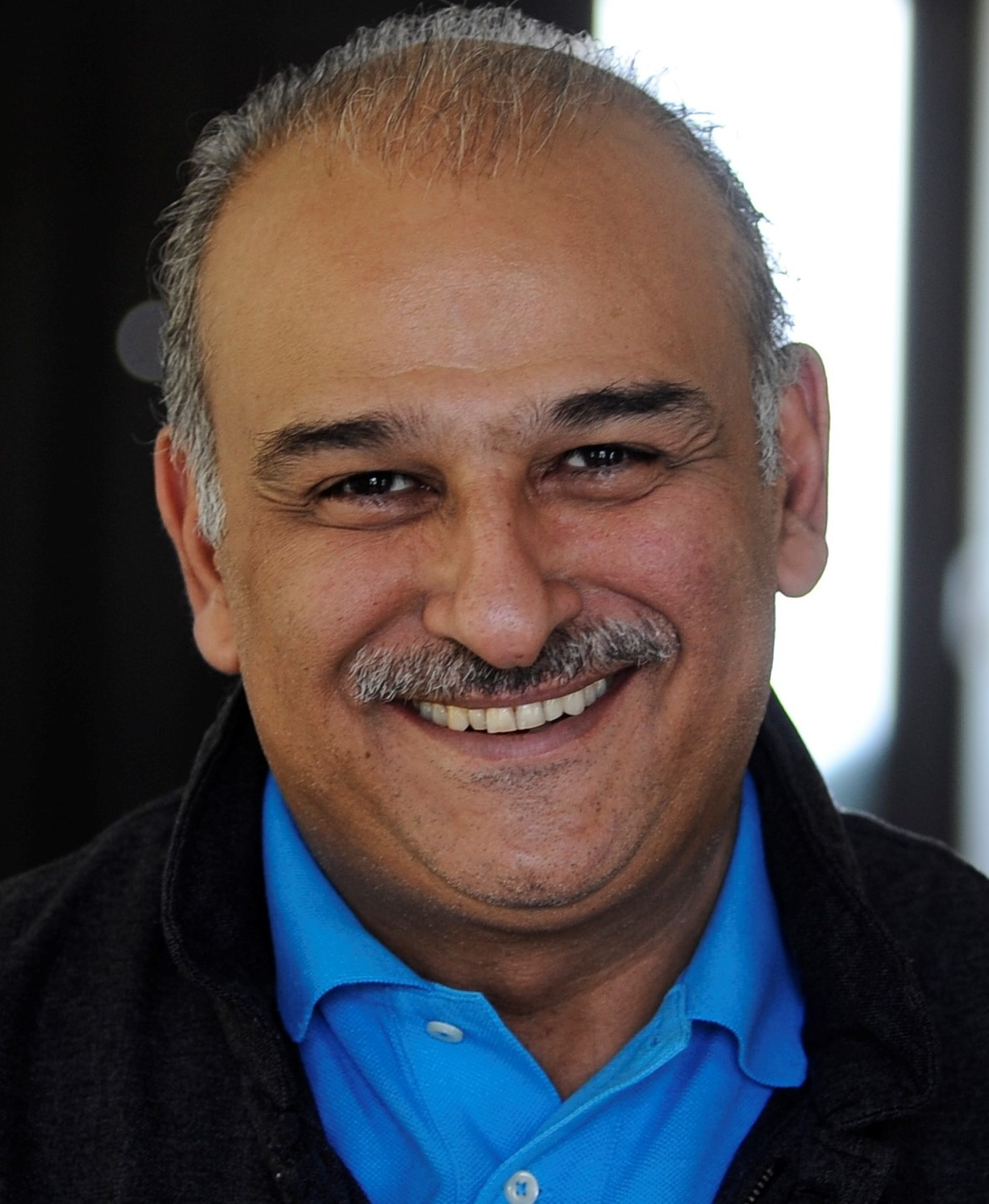
Jamal Suliman
(Abu Saleh)

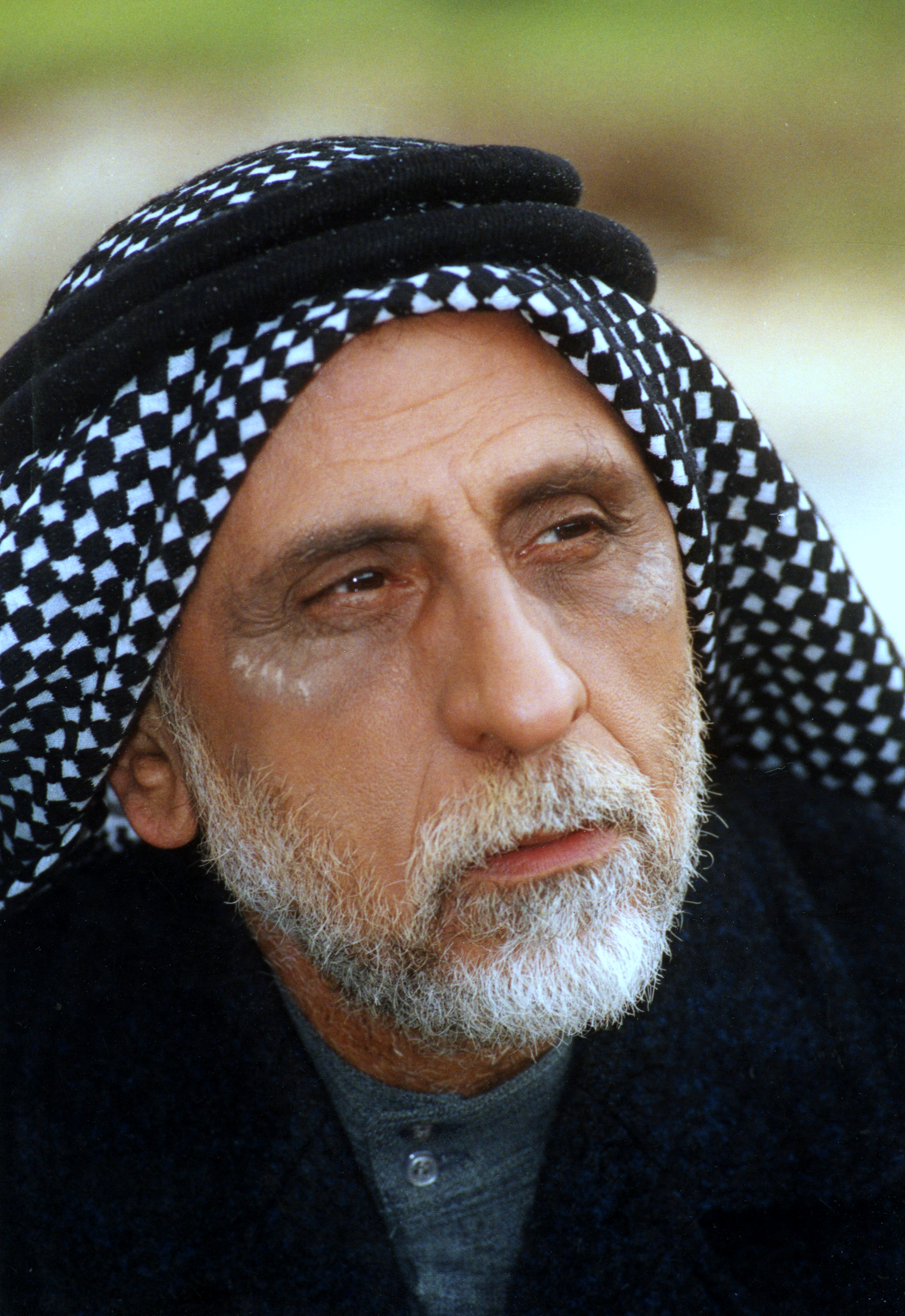
Hasan Owati
(Abu Ayed)

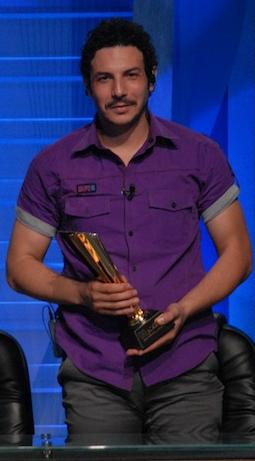
Basel Khayat
(Hasan)

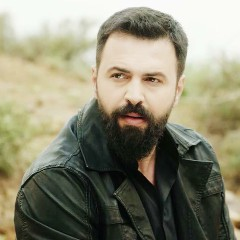
Taim Hasan
(Ali)

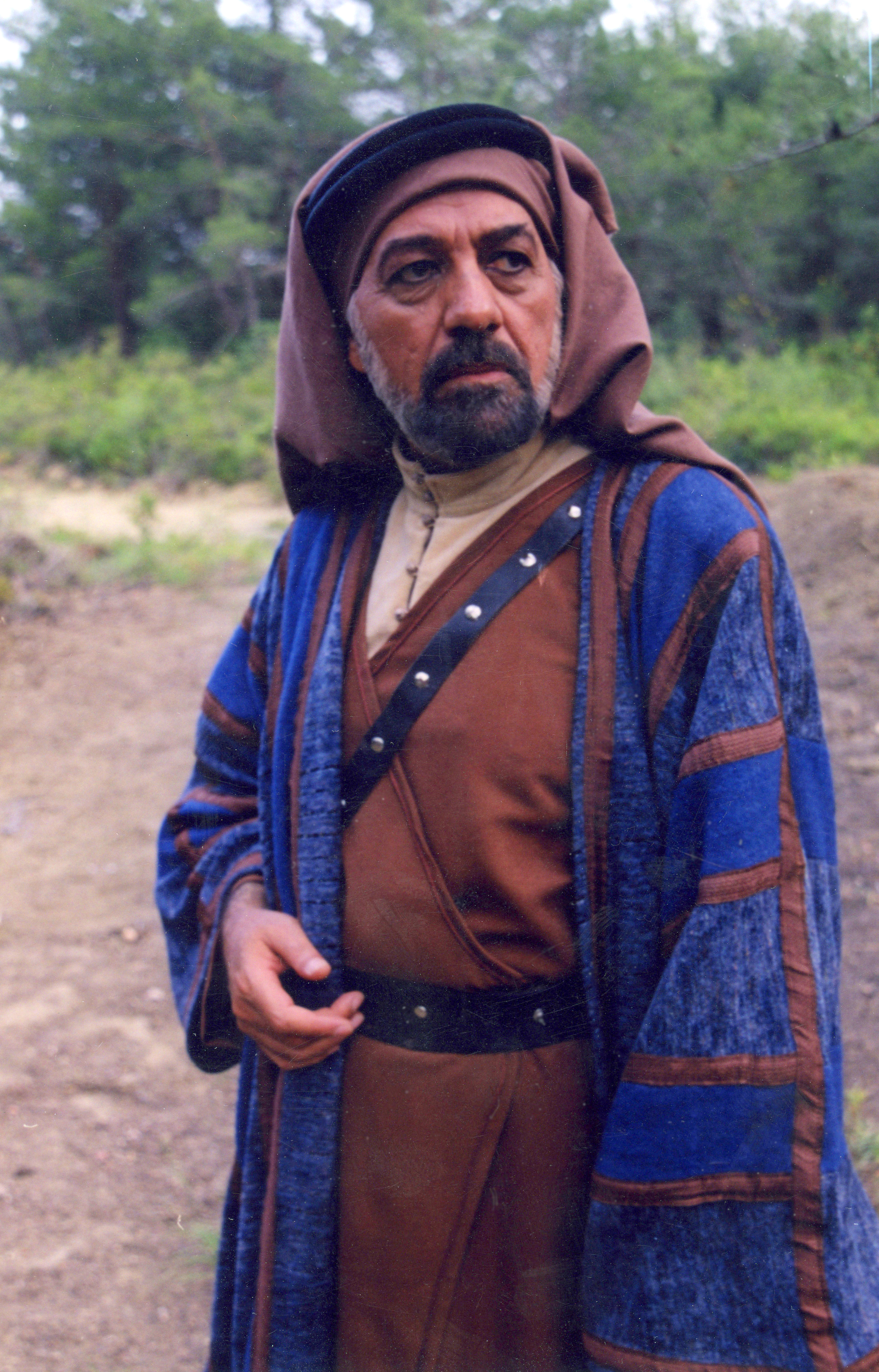
Jamil Awad
(Abu Azmi)

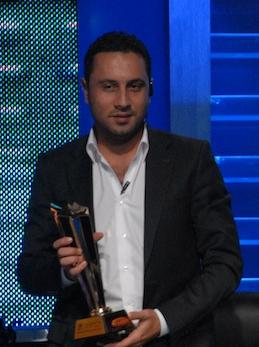
Qays Sheikh
(Salah)

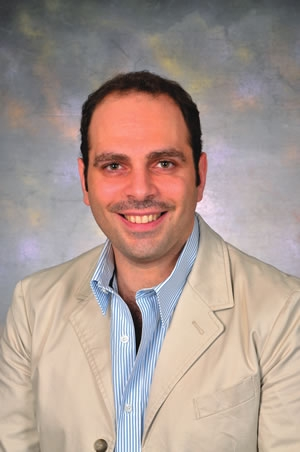
Eyad Abu Shamamt
(Mahmod)

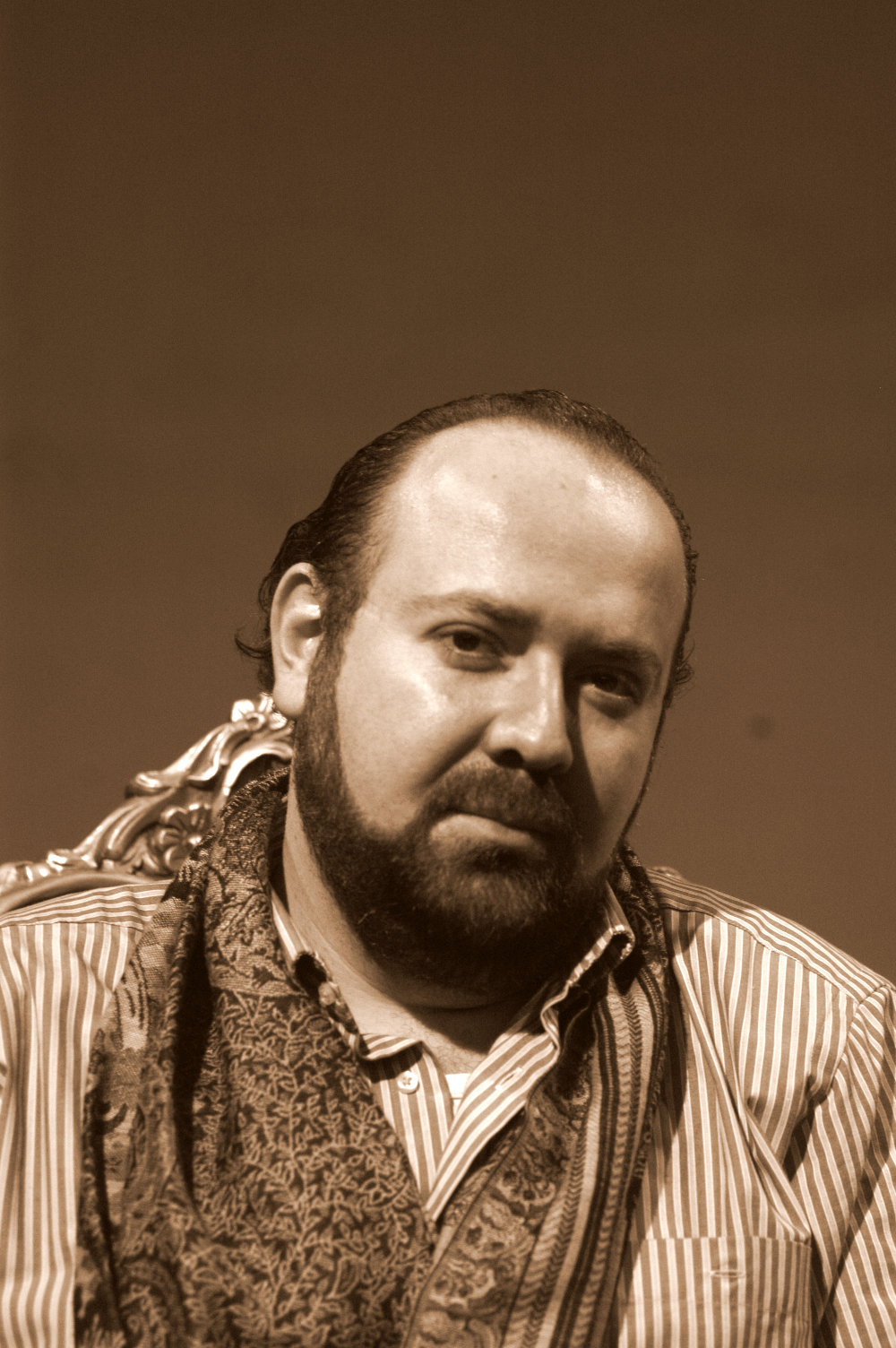
Bassam Dawood
(Mustafa)

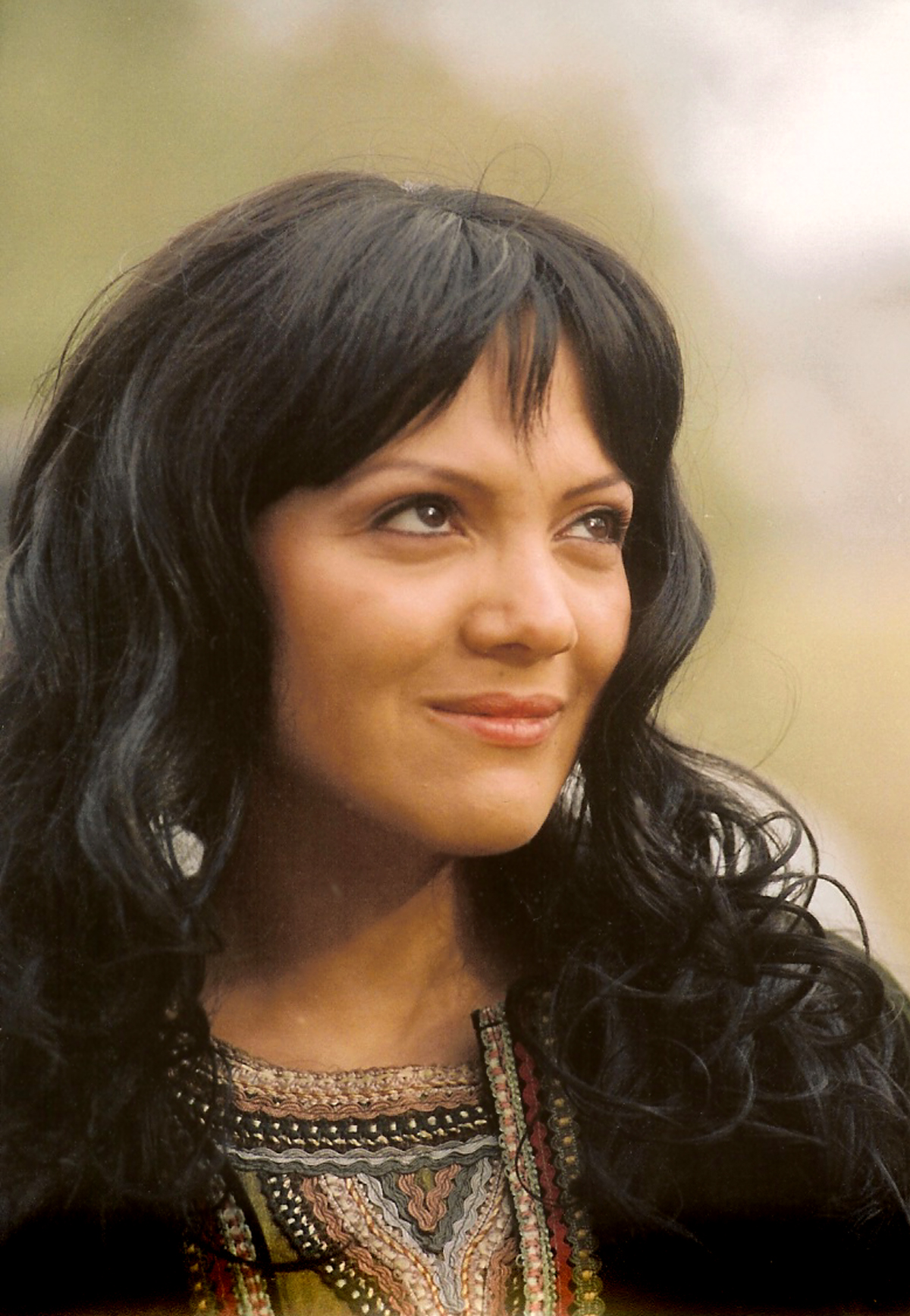
Nadine Salameh
(Khadra)
- Jamal Suliman
- Khaled Taja
- Rami Hanna
- Nadine Salameh
- Juliet Awwad
- Taim Hasan
- Nesreen Tafesh
- Maxim Khalil
- Anahid Fayad
- Ahmad Harhash

== Production ==
The show is a reproduction of a prior 30-episode show released in 2000 called الدرب الطويل (lit. 'the long path'), directed by Salah Abu-Hunud, which was met with limited success.

== Reception ==
The series is credited with portraying pre-1948 Palestinian life in a non-idealized light, unlike some prior similar works, the pre-1948 portrayal includes themes of classism and poverty. Professor Mustafa Kabha of Tel Aviv University's history department wrote in 2016 that while the series attempts to avoid historical inaccuracies, it did contain some historical errors, such as incorrectly depicting the refugees of Wadi al-Hawarith as camping on the beaches of Haifa in 1935. A 2004 Al Jazeera Arabic article on the series praised it saying that it "safeguards Palestinian memory".

== Awards ==
- Khaled Taja won the Best Actor Award for a Second Role for his performance in Al-Taghreba al-Falastenya, at the Cairo Festival for Radio and Television, 2005.

== Controversy ==
In 2020, the Saudi streaming service MBC Shahid delisted the show, leading to criticism from social media users and political activists, who responded by review bombing the streaming service, the streaming service stated the show was delisted due to copy right issues, the show was later relisted on the streaming service.
