= The Platform (TV series) =

- Genre: Thriller drama
- Created by: Hozan Akko
- Directed by: Rodrigo Kirchner
- Starring: Maxim Khalil
- Countries of origin: Syria, UAE
- Original language: Arabic
- No. of seasons: 3
- No. of episodes: 28

Production
- Executive producer: Hedi Karnit
- Producer: Mansoor Al Yabhouni Al Daheri
- Production location: Abu Dhabi
- Running time: 50–60 minutes
- Production companies: Filmgate Productions FZ LLC, Abu Dhabi

Original release
- Network: Netflix
- Release: 3 September 2020 – 1 June 2021

The Platform (Arabic: المنصة, romanized: Al-Minasa) is an Emirati-Syrian TV series created and written by Hozan Akko, produced by Mansoor Al Yabhouni Al Daheri, and directed by Rodrigo Kirchner.

The series is produced by Filmgate Abu Dhabi and shot in the United Arab Emirates. The 12-episode first season premiered on Netflix on September 3, 2020, and stars Syrian actor Maxim Khalil as Karam, who is struggling to keep his family together after his father (Salloum Haddad) is imprisoned on terrorism charges.

== Overview ==
The series revolves around the programmer, Karam El Sayed played by Maxim Khalil looks into his truth-finding mission. He had a more than complicated youth. His brother Adam (Samer Ismail) was misused by a family friend and Extremist group leader Naji (Khaled El Sayed). His abusive father, a carpenter, played by Salloum Haddad, is involved in the same group. This led to him mistrusting every person he meets and eventually creating an open-source-based truth finder, which he calls "the platform." His adult life story starts at his first peak of success. He just published his first book in Los Angeles when the situation escalates. He needs to go back to his parents' city and join his family in a tragic situation. The mistrust in his father and his friends is higher than ever, including his youth friend Sarah (Leen Gherra).

== Cast ==
- Maxim Khalil, Karam El Sayed, 12 episodes, 2020
- Khaled Alkeesh, Zico, 11 episodes, 2020
- Alnemr Abdulmohsen, Nasser, 11 episodes, 2020
- Khaled El Sayed, Naji, 11 episodes, 2020
- Leen Gherra, Sarah, 10 episodes, 2020
- Samer Ismail, Adam, 10 episodes, 2020
- Mahira Abdelaziz, Sheikha, 9 episodes, 2020
- Yaser Al-Neyadi, Seif, 9 episodes, 2020
- Reham Alkassar, Amal, 9 episodes, 2020
- Salloum Haddad, Hazem El Sayed, 9 episodes, 2020
- Shadi Al Safadi, Adnen, 8 episodes, 2020
- Dean Cain, John, 8 episodes, 2020
- Saoud Al Kaabi, Fahed,7 episodes, 2020
- Alaa Al Zuabi, Amin, 4 episodes, 2020
- Moatasem Al-Nahar, Ivan, 4 episodes, 2020
- Ahmad Aljasmi, Abu Ali, 4 episodes, 2020
- Yara Qassem, Eman, 3 episodes, 2020
- Samar Sami, Mom El Sayed, 2 episodes, 2020
- Adham Murched, Ramzi, 1 episode, 2020
- Sabrina Schimanszky, Investigator, 1 episode, 2020

== Critical reception ==
CNN Arabic film critic Samia Ayesh wrote: "The real star of the show was the technical mastery, which we are not used to in Arabic works." She added: "Rarely was there a scene that was boring or too long."
