= Ghassan Massoud =

Syrian actor and filmmaker (born 1958)

- غسّان مسعود
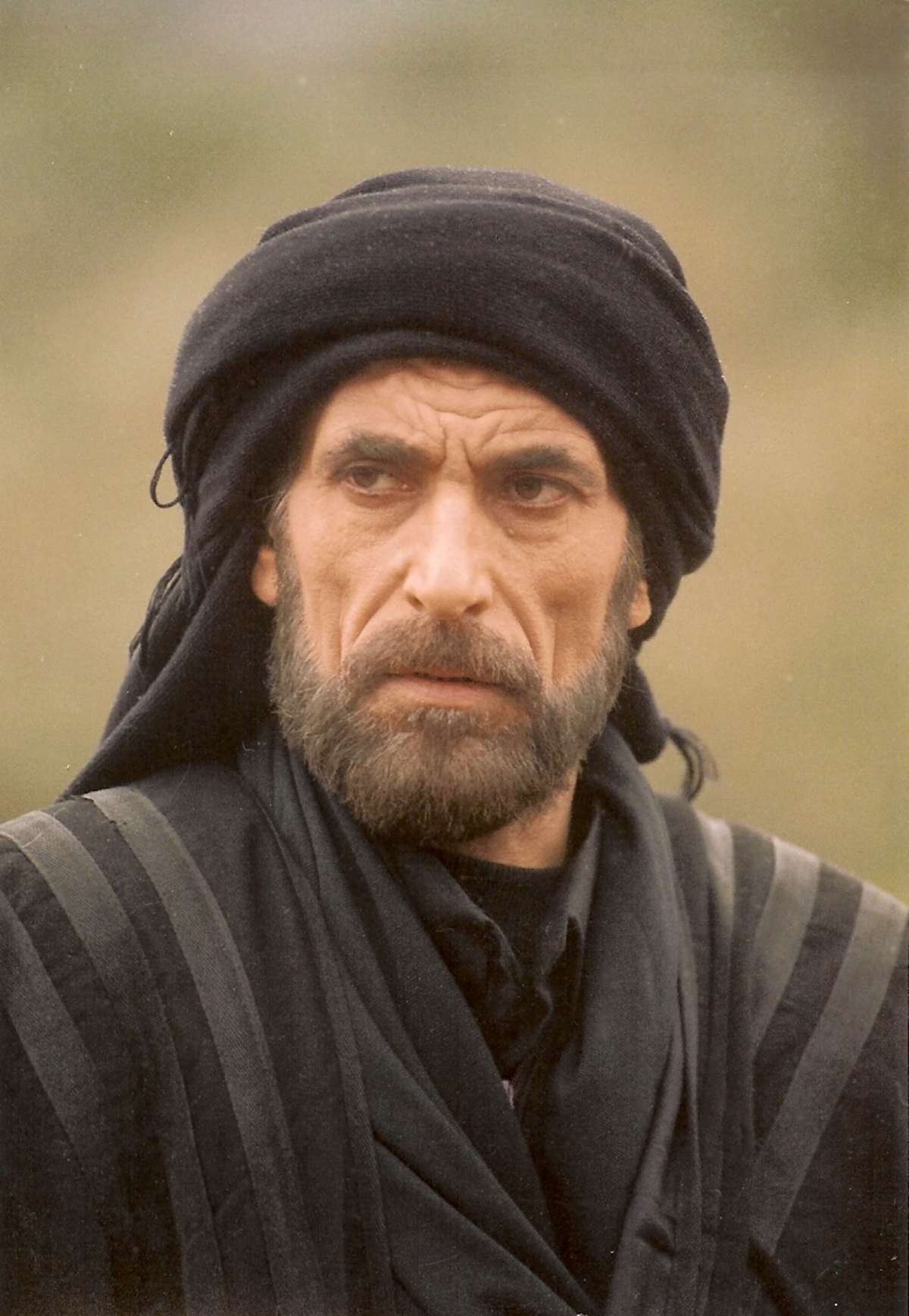
- Massoud in 2003
- Born: 20 September 1958 (age 68); Fajlit, Tartous, Second Syrian Republic
- Occupation: Actor
- Years active: 1987–present
- Children: 2

Ghassan Massoud (Arabic: غسّان مسعود, ALA-LC: Ghassān Masʻūd; born September 20, 1958) is a Syrian actor and filmmaker. He is best known in the West for his role as Saladin in Ridley Scott's 2005 film Kingdom of Heaven.

== Career ==
Massoud is known in Syria for his appearance in many Syrian-made films, and for writing and directing the theatre play Diplomasiyyoun, and was part of the Syrian Ministry of Culture's National Theater's 2002 season. He has appeared in the Syrian television miniseries The Chant of Rain, and in Haitham Hakki's well-known work Memories of the Forthcoming Age, and on the Syrian stage was an actor in August Strindberg's Miss Julie. Most recently, he starred as the companion of Muhammad, Abu Bakr in MBC's series Omar.

Internationally, he is known for playing the role of Ayyubid sultan Saladin in Ridley Scott's 2005 film Kingdom of Heaven. He also played the "Sheikh" in the 2006 Turkish film Kurtlar Vadisi: Irak (Valley of the Wolves: Iraq), Ammand the Corsair in Pirates of the Caribbean: At World's End. and Ramesses II's Grand Vizier, Paser, in Ridley Scott's 2014 Bible epic Exodus. Massoud turned down a role in the 2005 film Syriana, claiming he feared the movie would be anti-Arab. When refusing the position, Massoud also highlighted worries about the political climate of his nation and the surrounding area. After watching the finished picture, he stated he later regretted his choice.

== Personal life ==
Massoud was born in Fajlit, Duraykish District, Tartus Governorate, in Syria.

He is married and has a son and a daughter. Massoud teaches drama at both the Damascus Music and Drama School and the Higher Institute for Dramatic Arts.

== Filmography ==
Film
Year	Title	Role	Note
1995	The Survivor	Shamoon	Arabic title: Al-mutabaqqī (المتبقي)
2005	Kingdom of Heaven	Saladin	
2006	Valley of the Wolves: Iraq	Sheikh Abdurrahman Halis Karkuki	Turkish title: Kurtlar Vadisi: Irak
2006	Dhilal al sammt		
2007	Pirates of the Caribbean: At World's End	Captain Ammand	
2007	Juba	Al-Syeikh Suleiman Al-'Ābid	
2008	The Promise	Sahrawi	ِArabic title: Al-wa'd (الوعد)
2009	The Butterfly	Mevlevi Dede	Turkish title: Kelebek
2014	Exodus: Gods and Kings	Paser	
2016	Baron	Sulaymani	
2017	All the Money in the World	Arab Sheikh	
2019	Tomiris	Cyrus	Kazakh title: Томирис
2023	The Cello	Saleh Latif	
2025	Desert Warrior	King Numan	

Television
Year	Title	Role	Note
2001	Salah Al-deen Al-Ayyobi	Qadi al-Fadil	ِArabic title: Ṣalāḥ ad-Dīn al-Ayyūb (صلاح الدين الأيوبي)
2002	Falcon of Quraysh	As-Sumayl ibn Hatim	ِArabic title: Saqr Quraish (صقر قريش)
2003	Al-Hajjaj	Abd Allah ibn al-Zubayr	ِArabic title: al-Ḥajjāj (الحجاج)
2005	Al-Zahir Baybars	As-Salih Ayyub	Arabic title: al-Ẓāhir Baybars (الظاهر بيبرس)
2012	Omar	Abu Bakr	Arabic title: Umar (عمر)
2024	Mehmed: Fetihler Sultani	Abu Ayyub al-Ansari	

== See also ==
- Khaled Taja
- Duraid Lahham
