= Rasha Shurbatji =

Syrian director (born 1975)

Rasha Hesham Shurbatji
- Born: April 20, 1975 (age 51); Cairo, Egypt
- Occupation: director
- Years active: 1997–present
- Notable work: Birth from Side (2011 -2012), Eastern bed (2010) and Little Thorns (2005)
- Spouse(s): Naser Alrakka (m. 2007; div. 2012) Tammam Alsaleh Najm Aldeen (m. 2013; div. 2023) Ibrahim Sheikh Ibrahim (m. 2024)

Rasha Hesham Shurbatji (Arabic: رشا هشام شربتجي; born 20 April 1975) is a Syrian director. She has directed Syrian and pan-Arab television dramas, including Ashwak Naaeima, Ghezlan fi Ghabat al-Dhiab, Zaman Al'ar, Asaad al-Warraq, Wiladah Min Al-Khasira, Kasr Adm, Wlad Badee'a and Matbakh al-Madinah.

== Early life and career ==
Rasha Shurbatji was born in Cairo to a Syrian father and an Egyptian mother. She is a dual citizen of both countries. Her father, Hesham Shurbatji, was born in 1948. He also was a director. She began her career as an assistant director in family 7 stars in 1997. Her first work was in Qanon wa laken in 2003. Her most popular work were Little Thorns in 2005 Man of dreams in 2007, Time of Shame in 2009, Ebn Alarandali in 2009, Birth from waist in 2011, Daughters of family in 2012, Private relations in 2015, Samra in 2016, Way in 2018, Prova in 2019.

== Personal life ==
Rasha Shurbatji was married to a Syrian cinematographer, Naser Alrakka. They separated in September 2012. In February 2013, she married the Syrian intelligence officer, Tammam Alsaleh Najem Eldin. She became sister-in-law to Suzan Najm Aldeen. They celebrated their Wedding in Dubai in March 2013. She announced her divorce from Tammam Alsaleh Najem Eldin in an interview in 2023, after a decade of their marriage In a recent interview, Rasha announced her marriage to Ibrahim Sheikh Ibrahim, a Syrian actor

== Works ==
- Qannon wa laken (2003)
- Khamsa we Khmesa (2005)
- Little Thorns (2005)
- Deer in Wolves forest (2006)
- Accident in The way (2007)
- Sons of night (2007)
- Man of Dreams (2007)
- Honor of Opening door (2008)
- Another Raining day (2008)
- Zaman Al'ar (2009)
- Ebn Alarandali (2009)
- Eastern bed (2010)
- Asaad Alwaraq (2010)
- Birth from Side (2011)
- Daughters of family (2012)
- Birth from side 2 (2012)
- Wesh Rajaak (2014)
- Private Relationships (2015)
- Samra (2016)
- Miss (2017)
- Way (2018)
- I cant (2019)
- Prova (2019)
- Ma Fiyi (2019-2020)
- Banat Al Thanawi (2022)
- Marba Al Ezz (2023)
- Children of Ba'dia (2024)

== Selected directing credits ==
The following selected credits are based on elCinema's filmography and additional Arabic media coverage.

Year	Title	Original title	Notes
2003	Qanun Walaken	قانون ولكن	First series credited to Shurbatji as director.
2005	Ashwak Naaeima	أشواك ناعمة	Social drama about adolescent girls.
2006	Ghezlan fi Ghabat al-Dhiab	غزلان في غابة الذئاب	Syrian television drama.
2008	Youm Momter Akhar	يوم ممطر آخر	Syrian television drama.
2008	Sharaf Fath El Bab	شرف فتح الباب	Egyptian television drama.
2009	Zaman Al'ar	زمن العار	Winner of first prize at the Mohammed bin Rashid Award for Arab Drama.
2010	Asaad al-Warraq	أسعد الوراق	Remake of an earlier Syrian drama.
2010	Takht Sharqi	تخت شرقي	Syrian television drama.
2011	Wiladah Min Al-Khasira	ولادة من الخاصرة	First season of the social drama written by Samer Radwan.
2012	Wiladah Min Al-Khasira 2	ولادة من الخاصرة 2	Second season directed by Shurbatji.
2015	Ealaqat Khasa	علاقات خاصة	Pan-Arab television drama.
2016	Samra	سمرا	Drama addressing stateless children.
2017	Shouq	شوق	Syrian television drama.
2018	Tareeq	طريق	Television drama.
2019	Prova	بروفا	Television drama.
2019–2020	Ma Fiyi	ما فيي	Lebanese-Syrian drama series.
2021–2023	Haret al-Qubba	حارة القبة	Syrian period drama, seasons 1–3.
2022	Kasr Adm	كسر عضم	Social drama about corruption and post-war social conflict.
2023	Marba al-Ezz	مربى العز	Syrian television drama.
2024	Wlad Badee'a	ولاد بديعة	Social drama written by Yamen al-Hajli and Ali Wajeeh.
2024	Al Moharrej	المهرج	Television drama.
2025	Nasamat Ayloul	نسمات أيلول	Television drama.
2026	Matbakh al-Madinah	مطبخ المدينة	Syrian social drama written by Ali Wajeeh and Saif Reda Hamed.
