= Salah Al-deen Al-Ayyobi (TV series) =

- Also known as: Salah Al-Din
- صلاح الدين الأيوبي
- Genre: Biography, drama, religion, history, serial
- Based on: Salah Al-Din
- Directed by: Hatem Ali
- Starring: Jamal Suleiman; Suzan Najm Aldeen; Bassem Yakhour; Najah Sfkony; Wael Ramadan; Mohammed Miftah
- Composer: Walid Saif
- Country of origin: Syria
- Original language: Arabic
- No. of seasons: 1
- No. of episodes: 30

Production
- Executive producer: Muthanna Sobh
- Producer: Syrian Art Production International
- Running time: 40-45 minutes

Original release
- Network: MBC1
- Release: 2001 – 2001

Salah Al-Din (Arabic: صلاح الدين الأيوبي) is a 2001 historical Arabic television series directed by Hatem Ali which deals with the political events in the sixth century AH in the region of the Shaam and Egypt, in the scene of the Crusades. The series focuses on the biography of Salah ad-Din and highlights his courage and good creation and wisdom as he tells how he managed to unite the Muslims and crush the crusaders in the battle of Hattin and restore Jerusalem after being taken away by the Crusaders for almost a hundred years.

The series presents the historical narrative from an Islamic point of view and distanced itself from the thorny areas between Sunnis and Shiites, as it refrains from addressing the Fatimid Ismaili Shiite orientation and the difference between it and the Zengid Sultanate of the Sunni Abbasid Caliphate, whether in faith or practice. The series consists of thirty episodes starting from the birth of the protagonist and continues to display events in chronological order with exposure to other threads complementary to the story and related to the historical period. The series conjuncts with the series Searching for Salah al-Din by Najdat Anzour on the impact of the Al-Aqsa restore, which began in autumn 2000.

== Cast ==
- Jamal Suleiman: Saladin.
- Suzan Najm Aldeen: Ismat ad-Din Khatun.
- Bassem Yakhour: Nur ad-Din Zangi
- Najah Safkouni: Najm ad-Din Ayyub.
- Wael Ramadan: Raynald of Châtillon.
- Mohammed Miftah: Asad al-Din Shirkuh.
- Arab characters: Bassel Khayat - Qais Sheikh Najib - Taim Hasan - Mahmoud Khalili - Ahmed Mansour - Nasser Wardiani - Osama Sayed Yusuf - Ali Madarati - Fadi Sobeeh - Mohammed Khair Jarrah - Kifah Khoos - Nizar Abu Hajar - Ghassan Jbai
- Rami Hanna: Usama ibn Munqidh
- Abdul Rahman Al-Rashi: Imad ad-Din Zengi.
- Alaeddin Kokch: Mu'in ad-Din Unur.
- Hassan Awiti: Shawar of Egypt.
- Jalal Shamout: Taqi al-Din Omar.
- Taim Hasan: al-Adid li-Dīnallāh

From Sudan

- Yasser Abdel Latif: Custodian of the Caliphate Jawhar.

From Jordan

- Nadera Imran: Saqaut Al Malik Jamrud.

Guests of honor

- Rafiq Subaie: Sahab al Hadas Murad (Sheikh).
- Rafik Ali Ahmed: Rashid ad-Din Sinan
- Ghassan Massoud: Judge Al-Fadil.
- The characters Franjieh Faiq Erqsusi - Nidal Segher - Ramez Atallah - Mohammed Al Rashi - Hima Ismail - Mustafa El Khani - Sulafa Memar - Radwan Jamous - Hossam Al Shah - Mufid Abu Hamda.
- Salma Al Masri: Queen of Jerusalem.
- Sala Faukharjy: Hadirna Qandisat Trabalas.
- Maher Salibi: Amalric of Jerusalem.
- Samer Omran: Louis VII of France.
- Saif al-Din Subaie: King Baldwin III.
- Mohamed El Tayeb: Conrad III of Germany

From Lebanon

- Urd Al-Khal: Constance of Antioch
- Walid Al-Allaily - Aida Al-Nazer.

Guests of honor:

- Khaled Taja: Byzantine emperor Manuel I
- Jihad Abdo: Raymond III the Prince of Tripoli.
- Carmen Lebbos: Princess Agnes of Courtenay.

With new faces

- Saad Lustan: Izz al-Din Gerdik.
- Amer Ali: Baldwin De Abelin.
- Nadia Hamza: Queen of France Eleanora.
- Kenaz Salem:Palian de Abelin.
- Aman Al-Arnad: Salah al-Din as a youth.
- Ahmed Al-Ahmad: Humphrey I de Bohun.
- Adnan Abdel Jalil: Egyptian Coptic.
- Bassam Daoud: Patriarch Heraclius.

== See also ==
- List of Islamic films
- Saladin the Victorious
- Al-Taghreba al-Falastenya
- Selahaddin Eyyubi (2024)
