= Old Times (TV series) =

Syrian television series

- Arabic: الخوالي
- Genre: Drama, Historical
- Written by: Ahmad Hamed
- Directed by: Bassam Al-Mulla
- Starring: Bassam Kousa; Salim Sabri; Sabah Jazairi; Amal Arafa; Salim Kallas
- Country of origin: Syria
- Original language: Arabic
- No. of seasons: 1
- No. of episodes: 30

Original release
- Release: November 2000

Old Times or Al-Khawali (Arabic: الخوالي) is a Syrian television series presented in 2000. The cast members include Bassam Kousa, Salim Sabri, Amal Arafa, Salim Kallas, Ali Kareem and a number of other Syrian actors. The series was broadcast in the Arab world.

== The story ==
The event in the series dates back to the late Ottoman rule of Syria (late 1890s–early 1900s). The series tells the story of a man (Nassar) whose wife died while giving birth because his mother had gone to the home of the noble family of Abu Hashem in the neighborhood to help Umm Hashem with the birth of her baby. When Abu Hashim heard about the birth of the male child, he promised God that he would go on foot to the pilgrimage when his son reaches the age of seven. The years pass and the child becomes seven years old and some of the inhabitants of the neighborhood prepare to go to the pilgrimage, including Nassar and his mother. Nassar who wants to propose to the daughter of Abu Hashim before going for Hajj, believes that her father delays the matter because he refuses Nassar. Nassar enters into a fight with the bakery workers when he intervenes to protect an orphan boy (Rida). He is put in jail for two days during which he is subjected to ill-treatment. On the 7th birthday of Hashim, his father holds a birthday party and invites the majority of the residents of the neighborhood to his home as well as the head of the police department (Yuzbashi Hilmi). When Nassar comes out of prison, he sets his sights on retaliation against the head of the police department. Nassar goes to the celebration where the chief of police is to be shot but the bullet hits Hashem in the chest. Nassar immediately escapes and meets with Sayyah, another wanted man. Sayyah and Nassar goes to the cemetery to hide and they become friends. Hashem is saved by his uncle the doctor. Pilgrims go on their long journey to Mecca as planned despite Hashem's injury. Nassar asks to meet Arafa in order to meet his mother. Karkar, an informer who works for the head of the police, hears that Arafa met Nassar while talking to his friend. Arafa is being detained and he is forced to tell the police station where Nassar is. The police go to the cemetery and heavy gunfire starts. Sayyah is killed but Arafa, who is wounded, and Nassar manage to flee. Nassar and Arafah will end up in an orchard. The events follow and Nassar is sentenced to death and Arafa to five years in prison after fabricating to Nassar a charge of trying to kill the Wali. Days after overnight in the open they come to a gentleman (Abu Jawad) who lives with his family in Douma. Because Nassar wants to meet his mother before going to Palestine. Jawad goes to Shaghour to bring Nassar's mother to Douma but Jawad is caught after suspicion. The trouble continues on Nassar and he begins to search after Jawad. Nassar kidnaps Karkar to testify about Jawad's place and confesses to him but he is killed when Karkar tries to kill the brother of Jawad. Nassar then burns the bakery to distract the police force while he enters the outpost to look for Jawad. He fails to find him and releases some prisoners instead. Nassar and Arafa return to a cave they have stayed in. Some young men join them and it turns out that they are the ones who was released. Nassar seeks help from Talib who works for Abu Hashim in a perfume shop. Talib is asked to enter the prison of the Hakam Dar with the help of the private driver to the deputy governor (Hakam Dar).

Talib fails to meet Jawad in prison but receives information that he is still alive. During his departure he gets caught and flees to Nassar's cave to join his group. In the meantime, Hanna informs Nassar about the arrival of a shipment of wheat from Hama. The group then sets up an ambush for the military that will secure the arrival of the shipment. Nassar and his group take most of the wheat after a fierce battle in which Talib get killed. After that, Nassar's uncle went to visit him after he sent him the owner of the orchard (Abu Ali) where he stayed first. Nassar entrusts his uncle with the task of searching for Jawad. An order is issued by the Wali to ban the possess of wheat in houses or shops until the return of the stolen wheat by Nassar. Destitution spreads among the population Shaghour as a result. When Nassar hears that he prepares to distribute the wheat to the neighborhood inhabitants with pillows at day and night. Abu Sulhi, Nassar's uncle is caught that he is smuggling wheat after finding seeds next to his shop. He is imprisoned and severely beaten by the police. Nassar launches a raid on the police station and heavy gunfire ensues. As a result of the harsh beating, Nassar's uncle is killed in prison. Later, two senior police officers are kidnapped to get a confession about Jawad's whereabouts but it appears they do not know where he is. After the pilgrims are about to return, the Wali intends to set up a luncheon on the occasion of their return and a police officer goes to the storeroom to fetch the food but notices that there is a hidden prison inside the store. The policeman then goes to tell the barber Abu Hosni that he suspects that Jawad may be in that prison. The news reaches Nassar and begins preparing to smuggle his friend Jawad. Nassar sets off with Jawad's brothers and they disguises themselves as police. They succeed in finding Jawad and he and his two brothers go back to Douma. But Nassar gets involved in a clash with the police and the policeman who helped him is injured. Nassar is in captivity and preparations begins for his execution the next day to avoid his escape. When Nassar never returns to the cave, his friends start to worry and learn that he has become a prisoner. They gather men from various areas of the Levant to save Nassar from the gallows. Sadness reigns in Shaghour because of the fate of Nassar. However, during the start of the execution, a revolt broke out between locals and police forces in the presence of the Deputy Governor and Chief of Police. The series ends with the death of the deputy governor and police chief Hilmi and the survival of Nassar.

== Cast ==
- Bassam Kousa as Nassar
- Salim Sabri as Hashem's father
- Sabah Jazairi as Hashim's mother
- Amal Arafa as Lutfiye
- Hussam Al-Shah as Arafa
- Salim Kallas as Abu Husni
- Hala Shawkat as Nassar's mother
- Abd Al Rahman Al Rashi as Abu Jawad (Jawad's father)
- Hani Al-Romani as the deputy governor
- Naji Jaber as Sayyah
- Milad Youssef as Talib
- Najah Hafeez as Umm Jawad (Jawad's mother)
- Mahmoud Jarkas as the neighborhood's sheikh
- Issam Abaji as Abu Sulhi, Nassar's uncle
- Mohammed Al-Aqqad as Abu Harb, the butcher
- Ali Kareem as the Police chief
- Sabah Obaid as Abu Ali
- Ayman Reda as Karkar
- Ghazwan Al-Safadi as Jawad
- Maguy Bou Ghosn as Nasra

== See also ==
- List of Syrian television series
