= Nadine Salameh =

Palestinian actress

Nadine Salameh نادين سلامة
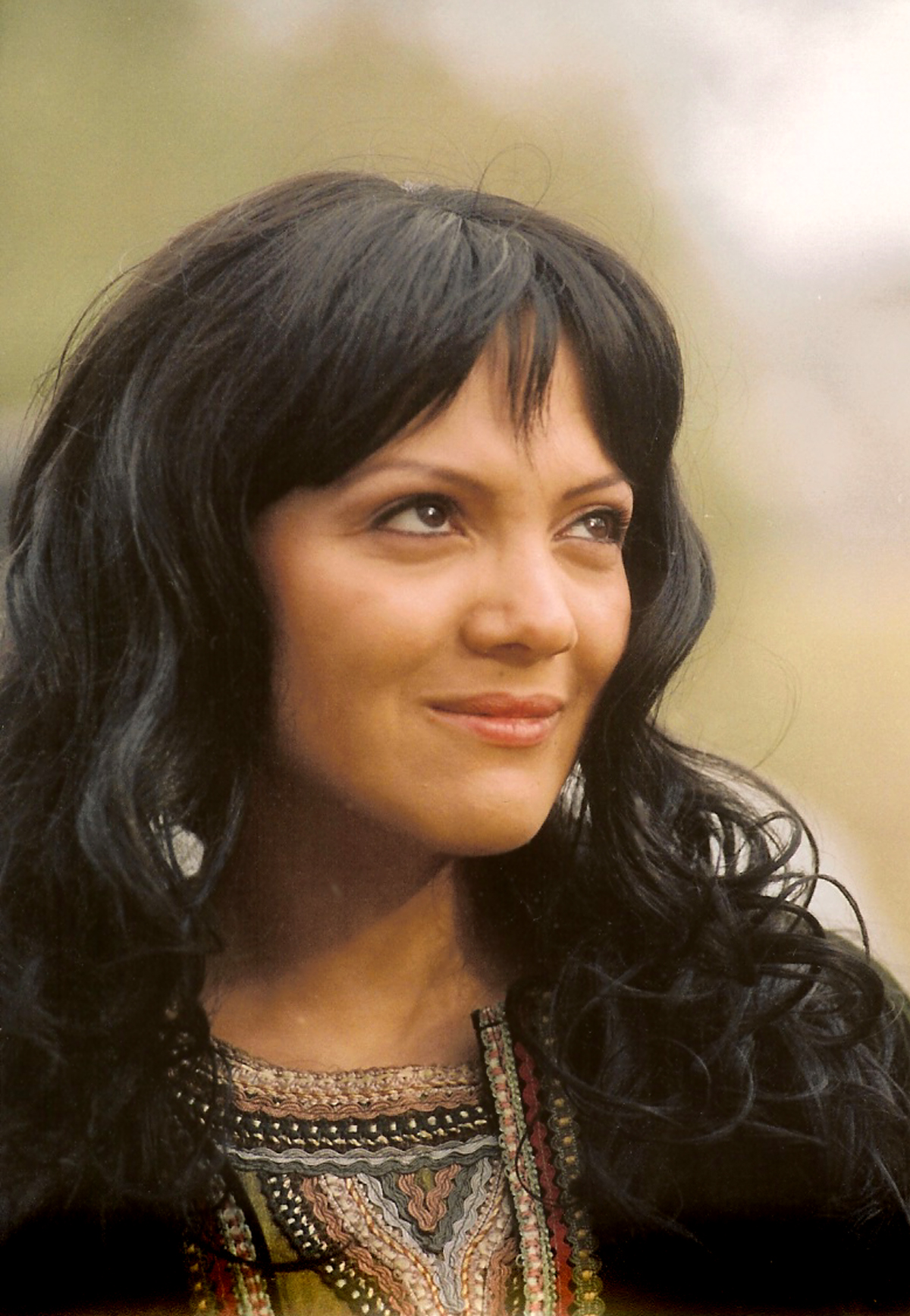
- Nadine Salameh in 2003
- Born: February 9, 1979 (age 47); Beirut, Lebanon
- Occupation: Actress
- Years active: 1998–present
- Children: 2

Nadine Salameh (Arabic: نادين سلامة, born February 9, 1979, in Beirut, Lebanon), sometimes credited as Nadeen Salameh, is a Palestinian actress well known in Syria, where she lived and worked for most of her life.

== Family and childhood ==
Before fleeing to Lebanon, after being forced out of their homeland, her family was originally from Acre, Mandatory Palestine. She also has Syrian and Turkish ancestry.

Her father, Nabil Salameh was an activist with the Palestine Liberation Organization (PLO). Initially he was associated with Yasser Arafat's Fatah movement, and later he co-founded the more extreme Black September organization. During the 1982 Israeli intervention in Lebanon he went missing, with the presumption by family and friends he was captured by Israel.

The Lebanese Civil War caused her to go to Syria, with her mother and two sisters. In Damascus, she studied in the Department of Acting of the Higher Academy of Theatrical Arts. She also studied Law at the Damascus University and had a master's degree in Political Sciences. She was mentored by some of Syria’s best known actors, including Naila Al Atrash, and Jihad Sa’d.

== Acting career ==
While a freshman in college, Nadine made her first TV series with the Syrian director Najdat Ismail Anzour called al-Kawasir. It was a 29-episode fantasy epic set in medieval Arabia about chivalry, war, love, and tribalism. In it, Nadine played the role of Zumuruda, a horse-riding, sword-flashing barbaric heroin. She has since made one play, two TV movies, one film for the cinema, and over ten television TV series.

Her most notable works are the movie Ru’aa Halima (Vision of a Dreamer) and the TV series al-Taghriba al-Filastiniyya (The Palestinian Exile). Her other works include Faris Bani Marwan, Khalf al-Qudban (Men Behind Bars), Ashwak Na'ima (Soft Thorns), and Ahl al-Gharam (The People of Passion).

== Personal life ==
She married a Lebanese Druze businessman in 2011, with whom she had two daughters.

== Filmography ==
- Al-Kawasir (1998) - TV
- Masrahi wa Masrahiyya (1999) - TV
- Lil Amal Awdeh (1999) - TV
- Al-Mizan (1999) - TV
- Amir al-Qulub (1999) – TV Movie
- Al-Ayyam al-Mutamarrida (1999) - TV
- Spotlight (2000) - TV
- Al-Basir (2000) - TV
- Radm al-Asatir (2001) - TV
- Ru'a Halima (2001) - Film
- Zaman al-Wasl (2001) - TV
- Soura (2002) - TV Film
- Unshudet al-Matar (2003) - TV
- Zamat al-Samt (2003) - TV
- Tarek Ibin Ziyad (2003) - TV
- Kihl al-Iyoun (2004) - TV
- Hikayat Kharif (2004) - TV
- Asr al-Junon (2004) - TV
- Kihl al-Iyoun (2004) - TV
- Faris Bani Marwan (2004) - TV
- Al-Taghriba al-Filastiniyya (2004) - TV
- Ashwak Na'ima (2005) - TV
- Asiyya al-Dame (2005) - TV
- Ahl al-Gharam (2006) - TV
- al-Batreek (2006) - Short film
- Ratl Kamel Min al-Ashjar (2006) - Short film.
- Sada al-Roh (2006)
- Wasmet Aar (2007) - TV
- Al-yawm al rabe wa al-thalatin (2006)- Documentary
- Rasael al-Hubb wa al-Harb (2007)- TV
- Katheer Min al-Hubb katheer Min al-Ounf (2007)- TV
- Haza al-Aalam (2007) - TV
- Jubba (2007) - Cinema
- Sabe Dakaik ila Muntasaf al-Layl (2007) - Cinema
