= Qamaran wa Zaytouna =

2001 Syrian film directed by Abdellatif Abdelhamid

Qamaran wa Zaytouna (Two Moons and an Olive) قمران وزيتونة
- Directed by: Abdellatif Abdelhamid
- Written by: Abdellatif Abdelhamid
- Produced by: al-Fursan Cinema Production and The Syrian National Film Organization
- Starring: Hayyan Daoud; Amjad Dinkraya; Raneem Fidda; Asaad Fidda; Norman Asaad; Houssam Eid; Nahed Halabi; Bassel Khaiat
- Music by: Marwan Alkarjously
- Distributed by: General Organization for Cinema
- Release date: 2001
- Running time: 90 minutes
- Country: Syria
- Language: Arabic

Qamaran wa Zaytouna (Arabic: قمران وزيتونة) (International title: Two Moons and an Olive) is a Syrian feature drama film by director Abdellatif Abdelhamid.

== Awards ==
- Muscat Film Festival - Best Director, 2001.
