= Abdellatif Abdelhamid =

Syrian film director (1954–2024)

- عبد اللطيف عبد الحميد
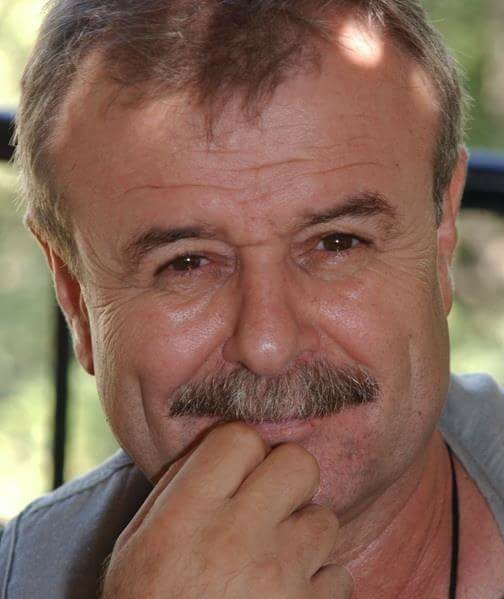
- Abdelhamid in 2017
- Born: 5 January 1954; Homs, Syria
- Died: 15 May 2024 (aged 70)
- Years active: 1981–2024
- Awards: Montpellier Mediterranean Film Festival - Critics Award; 1993 Rasael Shafahiyyah; Muscat Film Festival - Best Director; 2001 Qamaran wa Zaytouna; Singapore International Film Festival - Special Jury Prize; 2007 Kharej al-Taghtiya

Abdellatif Abdelhamid (Arabic: عبد اللطيف عبد الحميد, 5 January 1954 – 15 May 2024) was a Syrian film director. His films have earned numerous awards, beginning with the Damascus International Film Festival, the Carthage Film Festival, and Rabat International Film Festival.

Abdelhamid studied at the Gerasimov Institute of Cinematography in Moscow. He died on 15 May 2024, at the age of 70.

== Filmography ==
- Umniyat (Wishes, 1983) (Documentary).
- Aydina (Our Hands, 1982) (Documentary).
- Layali Ibn Awa, (Nights of the Jackals, 1989).
- Rasael Shafahiyyah (Verbal Letters, 1991).
- Suoud al-Matar (The Rise of Rain, 1994).
- Nassim al-Roh (Soul Breeze, 1998).
- Qamaran wa Zaytouna (Two Moons and an Olive, 2001).
- Ma Yatlubuhu al-Musstamiun (At Our Listeners' Request, 2003).
- Kharej al-Taghtiya (Out of Coverage, 2007).
- September's Rain(2011)
