= Suzan Najm Aldeen =

Syrian actress

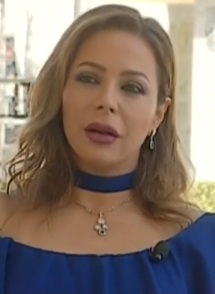
- Born: Suzan Al Saleh; 24 November 1966 (age 59); Duraykish, Syria
- Occupation: Actress
- Years active: 1992–present
- Spouse: Siraj Al-Attasi (m. 1995; div. 2014)
- Children: 4
- Relatives: Rasha Shurbatji (sister in law)

Suzan Najm Aldeen (Arabic: سوزان نجم الدين; born 1966) is a Syrian actress, whose memorable roles have earned her wide acclaim throughout the Arab world. After enrolling in the Faculty of Engineering, Architecture Department in Damascus, she was offered the opportunity to become an actress. This, however, did not stop her from pursuing her studies and graduating as an architect. Starting in 1990s Syrian dramas, Najm Aldeen went on to star in several renowned Arab series and movies.

== Biography ==
Najm Aldeen was born on 24 November 1966, in Duraykish to a Syrian Alawite family. She is one of six children, her father who was a poet, Najm Aldeen Saleh, was a member in the Syrian Parliament, and her mother, Dawlat Al-Abbasi, is also a poet. The actress lived with her parents, until she graduated, and then she went to Damascus to study architecture in the Damascus University. During that, she entered in the art society, that brought her being an actress, but that didn't hinder to continue to study in the university to be an architect. In the 1990s, Suzan became to play roles in the Syrian drama, first secondary, and then as a protagonist in many series. Her first interpretation was "Aldakhliah" ("الدخيلة"), with the Syrian actor Jihad Saad.

In 2016, Najm Aldeen signed on to play the leading role of "Rose" in the series Shoq, based on a true story. Rose was a captive taken by ISIS. The role addressed a topic that had drawn attention from the global public, human rights organizations, and the United Nations, as it shed light on the issue of sex slaves captured by the Islamic State. Syrian actor Bassem Yakhour also starred alongside her, and the series was directed by Rasha Shurbatji.

== Personal life ==
In 1995, Najm Aldeen married a businessman, Siraj Al-Attasi, but their marriage ended in 2014 due to their contradicting opinions regarding the Syrian civil war. They had four children together. She was a vocal supporter of President Bashar al-Assad during the conflict, but after his regime fell in 2024, she publicly expressed regret for her stance, describing the regime's abuses as "heartbreaking".

== Filmography ==
=== Film ===
- Ot W Far (2015)
- Hamlet Pheroun (2019)

=== Series ===
- Alkawaser (الكواسر) – Syria (سوريا)
- Aldakheelah (الدخيلة) – Syria (سوريا)
- Nihayat rajol shojaa – The end of a courageous man (نهاية رجل شجاع)–Syria (سوريا)
- Alzhaher Baibars (الظاهر بيبرس) – Syria (سوريا)
- Khan alharir – The Silk market (خان الحرير) – Syria (سوريا)
- Hanin (حنين) – Syria (سوريا)
- Salah aldin (صلاح الدين) – Syria (سوريا)
- Moluk altawaef – Communions' kings (ملوك الطوائف) – Syria (سوريا)
- Tuyoor alshawk – Birds of Thorns (طيور الشوك) – Syria (سوريا)
- Forsat al'omr – Opportunity of a lifetime (فرصة العمر) – Syria (سوريا)
- Zawj alsett – Lady's husband (زوج الست) – Syria (سوريا)
- Ommahat – Mothers (أمهات) – Syria (سوريا)
- Gibran Khalil Gibran (جبران خليل جبران) – Syria / Lebanon (لبنان / سوريا)
- Noqtat Nizam – System's point (نقطة نظام) – Egypt (مصر)
- Alharebah – The Escape (الهربة) – Syria (سوريا)
- Farouk Omar
- Wesh Tani – The Other Face (وش تاني) – Egypt (مصر)
- Shoq (شوق)
