= Jamal Suliman =

Syrian actor

- جمال سليمان
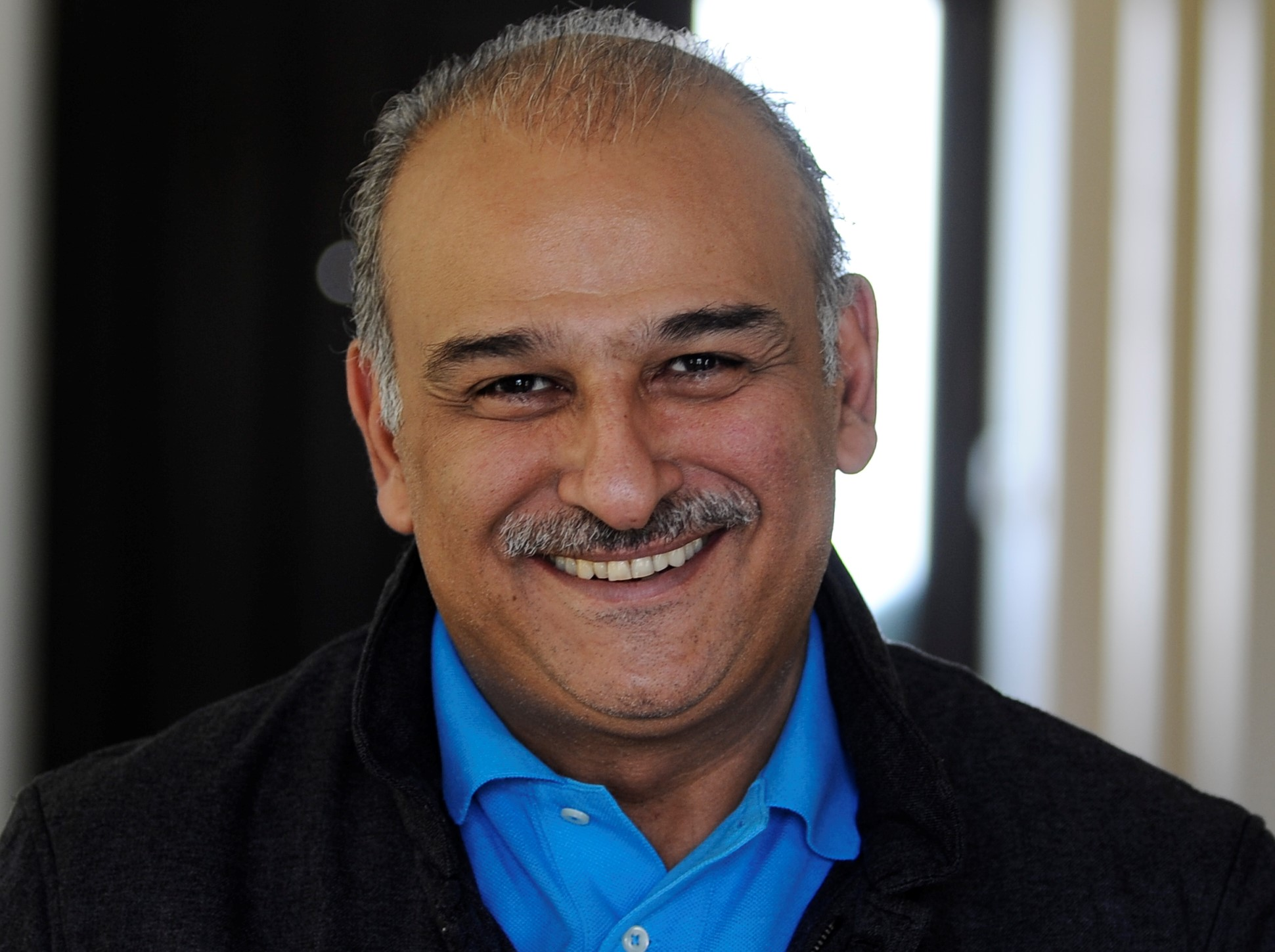
- Suliman in 2016
- Born: November 20, 1959 (age 66); Damascus, Syria, United Arab Republic
- Education: The University of Leeds
- Occupation: Actor
- Years active: 1981–present
- Spouses: Wafaa El Mowsily (divorced); Rana Salman (m. 2003)
- Children: Mohamad Suliman

Jamal Suliman (Arabic: جمال سليمان) is a Syrian producer, director and actor on television, film, and stage. Suliman was born in 1959 in the Syrian capital of Damascus, then part of the United Arab Republic. Suliman studied at the acting department of the Higher Institute of Dramatic Arts (Damascus). He started his career acting on stage and producing television series. Suliman then continued his studies in Britain and obtained a Master's degree in theatrical studies from Leeds University. He is married to Rana Mohammad Salman, daughter of ex-minister of Syria, Mohamad Salman. They have a son named Mohammad.

== Career ==
Suliman returned to Damascus as a professional actor in the mid-1980s, starring in many successful television series, coming into prominence with the 2001 historical television series of Salah Al-Din, depicting the life of the great Muslim leader Saladin. Suliman also had roles in a few films, but has preferred to use the television as his main medium for stardom. Suliman's popularity and fame spread to the wider Arab audience on his selection to play a prominent role in the late Ahmad Zaki's movie Halim. This role in the Egyptian cinema, known as the "Hollywood of the Middle East", gave Suliman further horizons on which to expand on, upon which his starring role in the Egyptian television series Hada'eq el-shaytan (Gardens of the Devil) has made him an Arab cult hero in terms of television. On the whole, Suliman received rave reviews for his acting in the series, his role involving having to accustom himself to the Sa'eedi accent and traditions (region of Upper Egypt with a distinct dialect of Arabic involved). In 1994 he played the role of Dr.Saeed in the film Survivor (Bazmandeh) directed by Seifollah Dad, this film based on the novel "Return to Haifa" written by Ghassan Kanafani.

Despite this, Suliman also received criticism from a number of Egyptian critics, journalists and actors alike, claiming that many Egyptian actors would have happily and effectively taken on this leading role in the Gardens of the Devil. Suliman had been quoted to saying that his determination to act in the Egyptian television had increased ever since criticisms were leveled against him.

On a humanitarian level, Suliman was selected as an ambassador of the United Nations Population Fund in 1999. He is a member in the Syria's Tomorrow Movement which is a Syrian opposition party founded in March 2016 in Cairo. In January 2025, he announced his return to Damascus, a month after the fall of the Assad regime, marking the end of his absence since the eruption of the Syrian civil war.

Suliman has expressed interest in running in the next Syrian presidential election.

== See also ==
- List of Syrian television series
