= Mawqef Micro =

Mawqef Micro (Arabic: موقف ميكرو) is a Syrian animated television series. It was Free Dome Media's second 2D cartoon animated production aimed at an adult audience. The first being Dr. Psycho.

Mawqef Micro Poster showing B'ro (front right) and Shadi (back left)

The show criticizes certain aspects, practices and retrograde ideologies found within the Syrian society and government, while simultaneously highlighting positive traits. The first season of the show aired on Addounia TV from August 11, 2010, which coincided with the first day of the Arabic month of Ramadan (as per the Islamic Hijri (Lunar) calendar) through September 9, 2010 (the last day of Ramadan). It encompassed 30 episodes, with each episode averaging 3:30 to 4:30 minutes.

"Mawqef" in Arabic means "Parking" and - in this case - "Bus Stop", so the literal translation of the title is "Micro Bus Stop"; however, during an interview which aired on mbc 1 channel on September 18, 2010, Ahmad F. Darwish the creator, animator, producer and director of the show stated that the title of the show is a play on words where the word "Mawqef" in Arabic also means "Situation", and "Micro" indicates a small thing so the title also means "A Small Situation" referring to the short length of the show's episodes, which - as per the show's English Press Release - keeps the episodes "boredom-free".

== Plot ==
The episodes take place on the street adjacent to a Micro Bus stop, which is a common means of transportation in Syria. There, the two main characters of the show, B'ro and Shadi exchange view points and argue about common daily life subjects, including topics such as the economy, social welfare and political views. The main idea is to highlight the contrast between two classes of people: the old-fashioned "common folk" and the new generation of educated youth.

B'ro wearing Valentine T-shirt on St. Valentine's Day (example of characters changing costumes depending on the occasion)

The show is introduced in a street-spoken Syrian dialect with a strong Damascene accent, with usage of slang and explicit words used to emphasise the characters' backgrounds. The running motif of Micro Buses driving in the background is used to censor certain words and emphasise the building tension between the two characters.

Each episode starts with a new topic and has a different storyline, and the conclusion is usually reached after each of the two main characters have expressed their opinion on the subject discussed, without necessarily approving of each other's views.

== Cast ==
The show has only two main characters starring in all episodes. "B'ro" (Arabic: برو), pronounced "Buhrroh": A hero of the common class, embodying heritage and a tradition-based prevailing mentality that is not short of wisdom, and who sells newspapers on a stand (cultural kiosk) by the pavement next to a bus stop; and his neighborhood associate "Shadi" (Arabic: شادي), pronounced "Shahdee": A young culturally established, well-educated, open-minded and knowledgeable university student who passes by B'ro's “cultural kiosk” everyday to buy newspapers and discuss different matters and hot topics of common interest to the Syrian and Arab people in general. Both characters are vocalized by Ammar F. Daba, the scriptwriter and scenarist of the show.

== Soundtrack ==
The show's soundtrack is composed of the opening theme which is a sarcastic vocal chant performed by the show's scriptwriter and scenarist Ammar F. Daba in addition to many other Arabic folk songs performed by various Arab artists which can be heard from B'ro's radio during the show. There is no ending theme, and the credits roll at the end of each episode is accompanied by a continuation of the last song heard from B'ro's radio. The opening theme is metaphoric. Aside from describing the bad shape in which the micro buses rolling the streets of Syria are found, the opening theme uses the micro bus' shape to reflect on the state of the Syrian and Arab people in general.

== Reception ==
The show gained wide interest and favourable reviews from both viewers and the Arab media. Different blogs were formed around the show and some Arab news websites like Althawra (Syrian government owned) praised the show describing it as an "Important milestone for Arabic cartoons" where other independent media news sources like Alray News praised it for being the "First Syrian adult-oriented cartoon". Baladna, a Syrian daily news paper dedicated the front page of its 191st issue to the show, with the headline "Animated Syrian satire pulls no punches" and it also stated that the show took the "Arab world by storm". The newspaper also dedicated two pages of its 193rd issue to the show and included an interview with the show's creators.

In its October 2010 issue, the Syrian Forward Magazine said that "The series is compelling in particular due to the reason that the everyday incidents of the characters and their relatives, friends and acquaintances, are major concern to most citizens of the region, which is how the audience can easily and quickly relate to and indulge in the stories."

== Future plans ==
Due to its success, both co-founders of the show (Ahmad F. Darwish & Ammar F. Daba), confirmed that a second season is currently in production and scheduled to be broadcast in 2011 during an interview that aired on mbc 1 channel's "Sabah Al Kheir Ya Arab" (Arabic: صباح الخير يا عرب, lit. 'Good Morning Arabs') morning program on September 18, 2010.

The show's second season aired in 2016.

== See also ==
- List of Syrian television series
