= Rodrigo Kirchner =

German film director, writer and actor

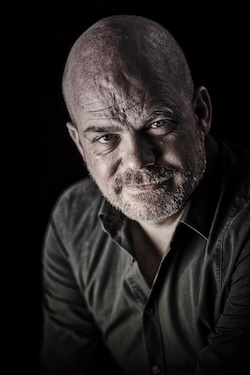
- Rodrigo Kirchner press photo
- Born: Sven Rodrigo Kirchner; Birth date 15.08.1970; Concepción, Chile
- Occupations: Film director, writer, actor
- Years active: 1992–present
- Known for: The Platform (TV series), The Brave, CERES TV Series
- Notable work: The Aftershock II, The sentimental reason to Kill People, Action Hero

Rodrigo Kirchner; (born 15 August 1970 in Concepción) is a German film director, writer and actor.

== Career ==
In school, he began as a theater actor in multiple roles, after school he was cast as the lead for the german french co-production Dies ist kein Garten Eden. After that, he started as an intern at a Goettinger protestant church production decision as a cameraman, editor, and "Mädchen für Alles" Jack of all trades as he said in a radio interview later. He worked as a camera assistant, creative writer, and DJ for the next years and was at this stage also performing in small roles. He worked after that for a few years in the internet boom media and in 1999 he began his real career at a daughter company of the electronic giant media market. "We could just create what we wanted as long it was funny enough for the media market brand - one of the best projects ever," he said about that time. He was head of the creative team and head writer of the media market online TV show project Kick it, but the dream came to a harsh end as Tiscali bought the daughter company "surfeu" and stopped the project before it went online.

Ralf Würth, the partner, who he was supposed to produce the show with, joined forces with him and they found together with Dietmar Gunz a daughter film production company Filmhelden a daughter company of Digato FTI Group. In the coming years, he learned the craft of filmmaking. Rodrigo soon after became known for his outstanding talent in adapting to the genres.

Hereafter, he was responsible for creating 27 feature films and TV series concepts produced in Europe and the US. He got involved in the writing, creative direction and put his unique stamp on his creations. He also started to direct some of them himself.

In 2014 he was asked to create a film for a 5D cinema built for the 2014 Corolla launch. Not only, took the Vice President of Toyota the film to Japan to show it to his boss in Tokyo. Also, the project won the Lynx award, and the movie won the MEAMB Award.

In 2016 he filmed Action Hero in US and UAE. Oliver Wood and Rodrigo created a new script for Action Hero. A movie and live-action-show concept. The Highlight of Mustang launch in the Middle East. The movie/show won 3 awards.

In 2016 Rodrigo wrote and created the movie Against Time. A tricky film and live show, which premiered at ISNR as Aftershock II which also won two awards.

Followed by "The Brave" in 2018 an Arabic drama about a family that gets separated in a Militia attack. Mohammad Hamadi and Rodrigo wrote the script. They won the TPMEA award for it.

In 2019/2020 – The Platform Hozan Akko and Rodrigo were the Showrunners for Season 01. It's a 12 Episode NETFLIX Series, and The Platform became the number one Arabic series for six months in the GCC region on Netflix.

In 2021 he created together with Ahmet Gül a Series of funny Adverts for a Hotel chain, which is already nominated for Awards only by reviewing the scripts.

Also, the new TV Show Ceres is in the making, a show about the Moon Ceres where a Corporation installed a heating unit to create a new high society living space. The show is planned to be shot End of 2022.

== Personal life ==
=== Parents / early life ===
He was born in Concepcion de Chile to German Parents his mother a Hospital head secretary Annette Kirchner, his father a school principal Horstmar Kirchner and his 2.5 old Brother Arne Kirchner. His parents decide for the kids' safety to flee the country in 1972 when all signs showed that the Chilean coup d'état will happen.

They moved to Bad Pyrmont where he lived until he was 18 Years when he move to Göttingen and start his career.

=== Move to UAE ===
After Filmhelden mbH's main production facility was relocated to the television station SonnenklarTV, which had been taken over by BigXtra, he decided to concentrate on directing and writing. His friend Kai Böcking, who already had connections in Dubai, paved the way for him to make contacts there. Since then, he has found a second home in the United Arab Emirates.

== Filmography ==
- 1990 Dies ist kein garten Eden
- 2001-04 N24 Abenteuer & Reisen, TV Series
- 2013 A Corolla Story
- 2014 Sheikh Zayed, A Legacy Remembered
- 2014 Action Hero, Ford
- 2015 The sentimental reason to kill people
- 2016 Aftershock II
- 2017 When The Gods Cry
- 2018 The Brave
- 2020 The Platform
- 2021 Ceres
- 2022 Ali Bey Group Advertisement campaign
- 2023 Sat1, Vollen Haus, Die Wüstenköniginnen
- 2023 Shramma Lamma
- 2024 The Rescue (The Takedown (wt))

== Awards ==
- 2018 TPMEA AWARD, for “THE BRAVE” Feature film & Show
- 2017 PRAVASI FILMFEST 2017, EXCELLENCE AWARD
- 2016 WOW awards, “Aftershock II”
- 2016 TMT ENTERTAINMENT AWARDS, Best Film Director UAE
- 2016 MEA BUSINESS AWARDS, Best Film Director UAE
- 2016 AI EXCELLENCE AWARDS, Most Outstanding Film Director
- 2015 MEAMB BUSINESS AWARDS, Best Film Director UAE
- 2014 MIDDLE EAST EVENT AWARDS for Toyota Corolla short film
