= Maxim Khalil =

Syrian actor (born 1978)

- Born: Maxim Hani Khalil; November 7, 1978 (age 47); Homs, Syria
- Occupation: Actor
- Years active: 1998–present
- Spouses: Yara Khalil (m. 1998; div. 2003) Sawsan Arshid (m. 2004)
- Children: 3

Maxim Hani Khalil (Arabic: مكسيم هاني خليل; born on 7 November 1978 in Homs) is a Syrian actor.

== Career ==
After he finished high school, he began as ballet dancer. In 1998, he worked as an assistant director for two years and was at this stage performing small roles. Since 2000, he began his real career and presented many works like Maraya, Ahl Algharam, Aldhaher Baibars, and Robi.

== Personal life ==
=== Parents ===
Maxim born to a Syrian Christian father and a Russian Christian mother; he held Russian citizenship due to his mother. His father Hany Khalil was a politician and military analyst. He had many compositions and lectures; he died in 1997. His mother Stila Tomolovic is a makeup artist and fashion designer. In 2017, many fans criticized him after many newspapers published that he left his mother in a retirement home in Damascus.

=== Marriages ===
In 1998, he married an actress Yara Khalil then they divorced in 2003. In 2004, he married another Syrian actress Sawsan Arshid who is also Russian by her mother. He has three sons: Hany from his former wife Yara, Jad and Lucas from his current wife.

=== Syrian Revolution ===
Khalil was known as one of biggest Syrian celebrities who stood with the Syrian Revolution against the Bashar al-Assad government. In March 2014, he announced his support of the Syrian revolution with his wife. In 2015, they were on wanted lists drawn up by the Syrian government's Political Security Directorate and General Intelligence Directorate. He also criticized the Free Syrian Army; he accused them of working for foreign interests to divide Syria.

== Filmography ==
- 1998 Al baher Al ayob
- 2001 Searching for Saladin
- 2001 Abu Tayeb Al mutanabi
- 2001 Ser Alnawar
- 2002 Saqar Quraish
- 2002 Zaman Alwasel
- 2003 Onshodat Almatar
- 2003 Cordoba spring
- 2004 Maraya
- 2004 Al-Taghreba al-Falastenya
- 2005 Big dreams
- 2005 Altareq
- 2005 Aldhaher Bebars
- 2006 Ahel Algharam
- 2006 Revenge of flower
- 2006 Ala tol Alayam
- 2006 Gazeles in forests of wolves
- 2007 Shadow of woman
- 2007 Narrow corridors
- 2008 Partners share destruction
- 2008 Hek Itjawzna
- 2008 Another rainfull day
- 2009 Zaman Al'ar
- 2010 Takht Sharqi
- 2011 Birth from waist
- 2012 Robi as Omar
- 2013 The Doubt
- 2015 Tomorrow we meet
- 2016 Ya reet
- 2017 Night
- 2018 Coma
- 2019 Dream Maker
- 2020 The Platform
- 2021 As Far as I Can Walk
- 2023 Smile, General in English Ebtasem Ayoha Al General in Arabic

=== Voice ===
- Gümüş as Mehmet Şadoğlu
- Detective Conan as Kaito Kid

== Awards ==
- 2009 Adonia award for best supporting actor for his role Zaman Al'ar.
- 2013 Murex d'Or as best Arab actor for his role in Rubi.
