= Peace by Chocolate (film) =

- Poster
- Directed by: Jonathan Keijser
- Written by: Jonathan Keijser; Abdul Malik
- Produced by: Jonathan Keijser; Catherine Léger; Martin Paul-Hus
- Starring: Hatem Ali; Ayham Abou Ammar
- Cinematography: Benoit Beaulieu
- Edited by: Mathieu Bélanger; Jonathan Keijser
- Music by: David Bertok
- Production company: Magnetic North Pictures
- Distributed by: Vortex Media
- Release date: June 18, 2021 (Tribeca)
- Running time: 96 minutes
- Country: Canada
- Languages: English; Arabic

Peace by Chocolate is a 2021 Canadian drama film, directed, produced, edited, and co-written by Jonathan Keijser. The film is based on the true story of the Hadhads, a family from Syria who moved to Canada as refugees from the Syrian civil war, settling in Antigonish, Nova Scotia and establishing the Peace by Chocolate artisanal chocolate shop.

The film stars Hatem Ali as patriarch Issam Hadhad and Ayham Abou Ammar as Tareq Hadhad. It was Ali's final film role before his death in December 2020. The cast also includes Yara Sabri as Shahnaz Hadhad, Najlaa Al Khamri as Alaa Hadhad, Mark Camacho as their Canadian immigration sponsor Frank Gallant and Laurent Pitre as an employee of the chocolate factory, as well as a brief appearance by Justin Trudeau reenacting his real-life meeting with the Hadhad family in 2016.

The film premiered on June 18, 2021, at the Tribeca Film Festival, and had its Canadian premiere on July 1 at the Lavazza Drive-In Film Festival, a special edition of the Italian Contemporary Film Festival which was staged at Ontario Place. At Lavazza, it was one of two winners of the Jury Award, alongside the Hong Kong film Septet: The Story of Hong Kong.

== Reception ==
Peace by Chocolate received positive reviews. On the review aggregator website Rotten Tomatoes, the film has an 86% approval rating, based on 21 reviews, with an average rating of 7.5/10.
