= Rukneddine =

Rukn al-Din رُكْن ٱلدِّين Rukn ad-Dīn Rukneddine
- Municipality

Arab transcription(s)
  - English: "Corner of religion"
- Interactive map of Rukn al-Din
- Coordinates: 33°32′24″N 36°17′50″E
- Country: Syria
- Governorate: Damascus Governorate
- City: Damascus

Population (2004)
  - Total: 92,646
- Time zone: UTC+3 (AST)
- Climate: BSk

Rukneddine, Rukn ad-Din or Rukn al-Din (Arabic: رُكْن ٱلدِّين, romanized: Rukn ad-Dīn) is a municipality of Damascus, Syria. In the CBS 2004 census, it had a population of 92,646. It is the historic Kurdish quarter of the city.

== Etymology ==
Originally named after Rukn al-Din Mankuris al-Faliki al-Aadili (ركن الدين منكورس الفلكي العادلي) who was a servant and companion of Falik al-Din Suleiman al-Aadili (فلك الدين سليمان العادلي), a half brother of al-Aadil Seif al-Din Abu Bakr Bin Ayoub (العادل سيف الدين أبو بكر بن أيوب) who succeeded his other sibling Saladin in rule. It is also the birthplace of the Mamluk-era Kurdish geographer Abulfeda.

== History ==
The Municipality has the famous "al-Madrasa al-Rukniyeh" in Shamdine Square (named after Said Pasha Shamdine), where Rukn al-Din Mankuris was buried.

it is the birthplace of renowned Islamic scholar and former Grand Mufti of Syria Sheikh Ahmed Kuftaro, who served at the Abu Nur Mosque in the district and was buried there in 2004.

On 21 March 1986, Kurds seeking to celebrate the Kurdish-Iranian New Year (Newroz) clashed with state security forces intending to prevent any festivities from occurring. One Kurdish youth, who was visiting from the northeastern city of Qamishli, was killed by police.

=== Civil War ===
Since the start of the first protest, the district has been a place for the police raids by Syrian security forces and the so-called Shabiha claiming they are searching for armed groups and terrorists.

On 12 August 2011, some months after protests had begun elsewhere in Syria, anti-government protests were held in several districts of Damascus, including the city's Rukneddin district. At least eight protesters had been shot dead by security forces during a demonstration with thousands attendees.

On 4 August 2012 the so-called rebels attacked and took 4 secret service cars and their weapons and one heavy DShK. On the very next day, a fighting started between the opposition troop about 600 armed men, and the Syrian Arab Army with help of security service and the police. It lasted 23 days and ended with the remaining opposition groups surrendering. The exact number of deaths remained unknown due to the isolation and lack of media coverage. On 7 September 2012 a motorcycle bomb in Shamdeen square killed at least five members of the security forces.

On 4 May 2015, Jabhat al-Nusra fighters on motorcycle committed a suicide attack against security forces in the municipality.

== Districts ==
- Asad ad-Din (pop. 34,314)
- Ayyubiyah (pop. 13,089)
- Al-Fayhaa (pop. 11,330)
- Al-Naqshabandi (pop. 33,913)

== Notable people ==
- Khalid Bakdash (1912–1995), the leader of the (SCP) Syrian Communist Party.
- Muhammad Said Ramadan al-Bouti (1929–2013), "Shaikh of the Levant" was one of the most noted Islamic scholars in the 20th and 21st centuries.
- Khayr al-Din al-Zirikli (1893–1976), a Syrian historian, nationalist and poet
- Ahmed Kuftaro (1915–2004), was the Grand Mufti of Syria, the highest officially appointed Sunni Muslim representative of the Fatwa-Administration in the Syrian Ministry of Auqaf in Syria
- Mohammad Hosni (1894–1969) father of Soad Hosny (1943–2001) was a master calligrapher at the Royal Institute of Calligraphy in Cairo.
- Mohammed Amin Kuftaro (1877–1938), was a noted Islamic scholar and head of the Naqshbandi Sufi tariqa
- Abdul Rahman Al Rashi (1943–2014), actor
- Cigerxwîn (1903–1984), writer and poet
- Khaled Taja (1939–2012), actor
- Kheireddine Wanli (1933–2004), poet
- Osman Sebrî (1905–1993) also known as “Apê (The Uncle) Osman”. Kurdish Author, Poet, Politician. Founder of Kurdistan Democratic Party Syria (KDP-S).
