= Nadia Arslan =

Syrian-Lebanese actress (1955–2008)

- Born: Hind Arslan; March 27, 1949; Lebanon
- Died: May 25, 2008 (aged 59); Beirut, Lebanon
- Years active: 1972 - 1987
- Spouse: Mohamed Larbi

Nadia Arslan (Arabic: نادية أرسلان), also romanised as Nadia Arsalan, was a Syrian-Lebanese actress who came to prominence in Egyptian films of the 1970s.

Born Hind Arslan (Arabic: هند أرسلان) to a Druze Syrian father and a Lebanese mother, she won a Lebanon beauty pageant in the beginning of the 1970s and moved to Egypt. Her first significant performance was in Galal El-Sharkawy's The Greatest Child in the World (اعظم طفل فى العالم) released in 1972 and starring Rushdy Abaza. She became a staple actress for supporting roles in flicks such as the 1973 film Memory of a Night of Love (ذكري ليلة حب) starring Salah Zulfikar and the 1975 film I Want a Solution (أريد حلا) starring Faten Hamama, and the 1965 film Everybody Wants to Fall in Love (الكل عاوز يحب) starring Adel Emam. Her last film of importance was Ahmed Yehia's 1984 film As Not to Fly the Smoke (حتى لايطير الدخان). After marriage to fellow actor Mohamed El Arabi, she retired permanently from cinema in 1987. After her retirement, she grew increasingly religious and later expressed regret for her acting career.

Arslan was diagnosed with breast cancer in 2005 and died on 25 May 2008.
