= Amal Arafa =

Syrian actress, singer, and writer

Amal Arafa أمل عرفة
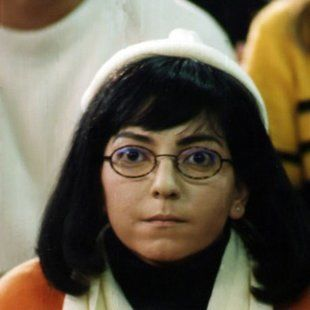
- Amal Arafa in 2004.
- Born: 18 March 1970 (age 56); Damascus, Syria
- Occupations: Actress, singer, writer
- Years active: 1990 – present
- Spouse: Abdulmonem Amairy (m. 2001; div. 2015)
- Children: 2

Amal Arafa (Arabic: أمل عرفة; born 18 March 1970) is a Syrian actress, singer, and writer. She is the daughter of Syrian composer Suheil Arafa. Amal studied acting in Damascus and learned from her father how to sing. She was married to the actor Abdulmonem Amairy for 14 years, but got divorced in October 2015. They have two daughters, Salma and Mariam.

== Series ==
- Aylet 5 Nojoom (1993)
- Nihayat Rajol Shujaa' (1993)
- Al-Jawareh (1994)
- Hammam al-Quishani (1995)
- Khan al-Harir (1996)
- Bent el-Dorra (1997)
- Al-Tweebi (1998)
- Dounia (1999)
- Akher Ayyam el-Toot (1999)
- Old Times (Al-Khawali) (2000)
- Asrar al-Madina (2001)
- Al-Waseya (2002)
- Sakr Quraysh (2002)
- Zekrayat al-Zaman al-Kadem (2003)
- Spot Light (2004)
- Ashtar (2004)
- Spot Light (2005)
- Deer in the forest of the wolves (2006)
- Kasr al-Khawater (2006)
- Washaa al-Hawa (2006)
- Nada al-Ayyam (2006)
- Time of fear (2007)
- Hassiba (2007)
- Awlad al-Qaymariyah (2008)
- Aswat Khafita (2009)
- Small Hearts (2009)
- Spot Light (2010)
- As3ad al-Warrak (2010)
- Al-Zelzal (2010)
- Takht Sharki (2010)
- Ba3d al-Soqoot (2010)
- Spot Light 8 (2011)
- Kasr el-Aqni3a (2011)
- Al-Za3eem (2011)
- Spot Light 9 (2012)
- Al Meftah (2012)
- Raffet Ein (2012)
- Spot Light 10
- Al Gherbal (parts 1&2)-2014-2015
- sarkhat rouh -2014
- Al Haqa2ib (Dobbou Shanati)
- Al Qorban
- Dunia 2015
- Madrasat Al Hobb

== Filmography ==
- Shay' ma Yahtarek
- So'od el-Matar
- Al-Layl al-Taweel (2009) – (8 Awards: Best Arabic Film in Taormina, India, Cairo...)

== Awards ==
- Special Jury Prize at the 2003 Arab Song Festival in Rabat
- Honored in Damascus Film Festival 2009
