= Nassim al-Roh =

Nassim al-Roh (Breeze of the Soul) نسيم الروح
- Directed by: Abdellatif Abdelhamid
- Written by: Abdellatif Abdelhamid
- Starring: Bassam Kousa; Sulaf Fawakherji; Lina Hawarneh; Salim Sabri; Fayez Qazaq
- Cinematography: Abdo Hamzeh
- Music by: Marwan al-Krjoslee
- Distributed by: General Organization for Cinema
- Release date: 1998
- Running time: 95 minutes
- Country: Syria
- Language: Arabic

Nassim al-Roh (Arabic: نسيم الروح) (Breeze of the Soul) is a Syrian drama film by director Abdellatif Abdelhamid. The film discusses different social scenes in modern Syrian society.

== Cast ==
·Bassam Kousa as Samer
·Lina Hwarneh as Mariam
