= Assaad Feddah =

Syrian actor and stage director (born 1938)

- أسعد فضة
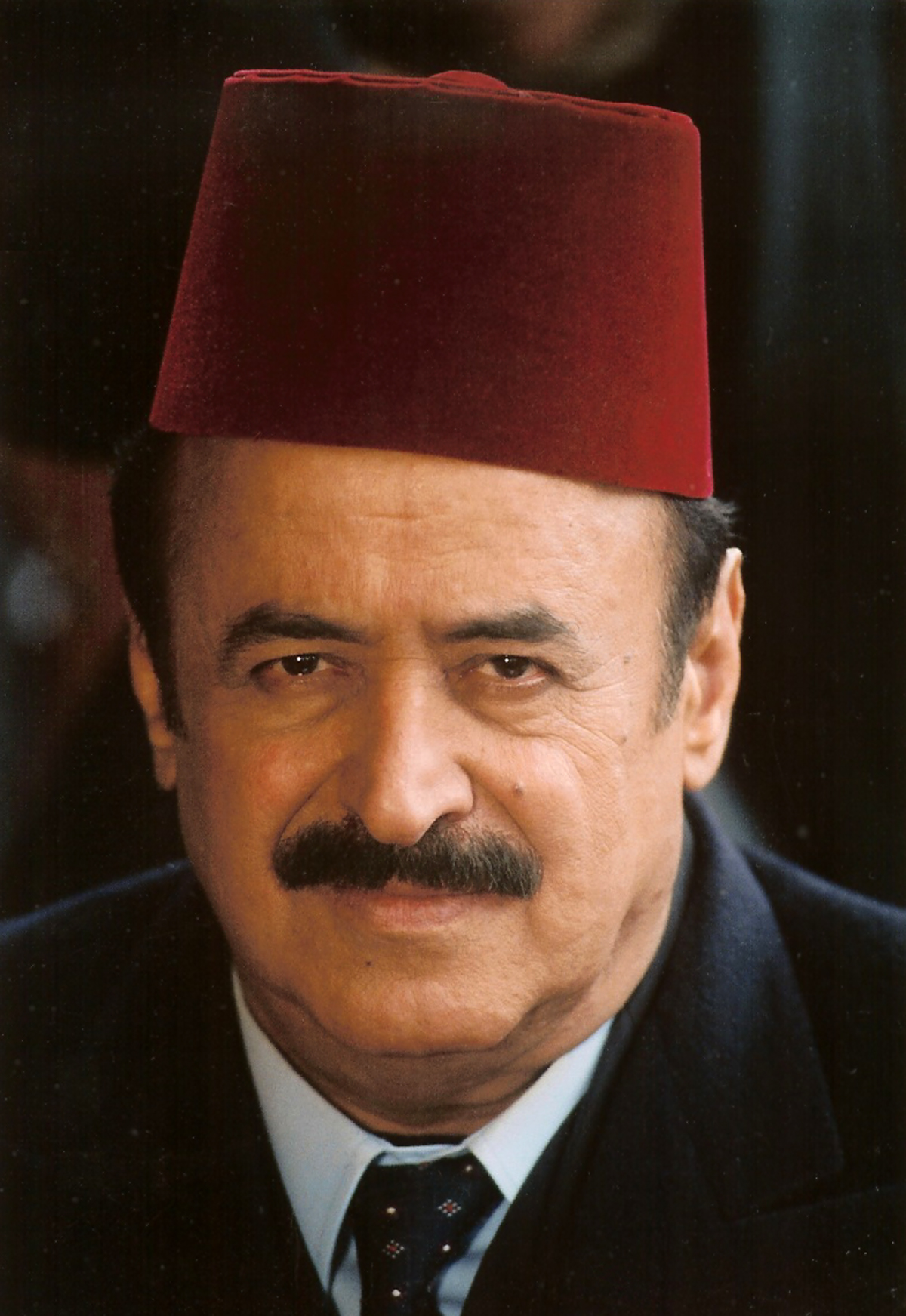
- Born: 5 September 1938 (age 88); Latakia, Syria
- Occupations: Actor; stage director
- Spouse: Maha Al-Saleh

Assaad Feddah (Arabic: أسعد فضة; born 5 September 1938) is a Syrian actor and stage director.

== Life and career ==
Feddah was born to an Alawite family in the village of Beksa in Latakia, and was a graduate of the Higher Institute of Dramatic Arts (Damascus). His works varied between television, cinema, and even on stage. He was the husband of the late artist Maha Al-Saleh, and he had a son with her.

In 2019, a few media sources circulated rumors about his death, which he denied later.

== Awards and achievements ==
- Feddah won many awards as the best actor and appreciation prizes from the Damascus International Film Festival and the Cairo Festival for Radio and Television. He was also honored in 2006 when the "National Theater Hall" in Latakia was named "The Artist Asaad Faddah Theater."
- Best Actor Award for the role of Abu Kamel in Nights of the Jackal at the Damascus Film Festival.
- The best historical role award for his role in the series (Al-Awsaj) at the Cairo Radio and Television Festival.
- Appreciation award for his role in the series (Al-Jawareh) at the Cairo Radio and Television Festival.
- Local, Arab and international certificates of honor and appreciation from the public and private sectors in the field of radio, television, cinema and theater.
