= Anahid Fayad =

Palestinian actress

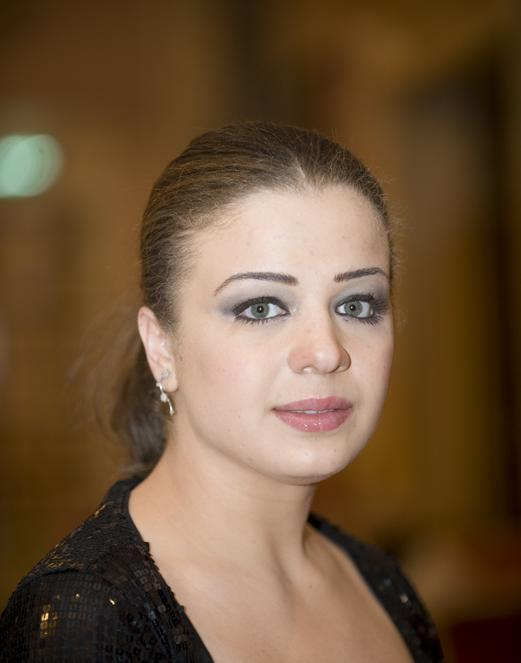
- Anahid Fayad in 2008
- Born: Anahid Ali Fyad; July 6, 1983 (age 42); Yarmouk Camp, Syria
- Occupation: Actress
- Years active: 2003–present
- Spouse: Mothanna Gharaibeh (m. 2011)
- Children: 1

Anahid Fayad (Arabic: أناهيد فياض; born 6 July 1983 in Damascus) is a Palestinian actress, known for her roles in Syrian drama, and her dubbing in Turkish drama.

== Life and career ==
Her father Ali Fayad is a Palestinian diplomat born in Gaza.

She acted in Bab Al-Hara, 42 days, Seraa Ala El Remal, 3000 Nights. She played Filiz in the Turkish series Ihlamurlar Altında.

She is married to Jordanian Telecommunications and Technology minister Mothanna Gharaibeh, and held Jordanian citizenship since then.

== Works ==
=== Series ===
- Escape to summit (2003)
- Palestinian taxonomy (2004)
- Me and 4 girls (2004)
- City of Information (2004)
- Little thorns (2005)
- Stick of Tears (2005)
- Houri (2005)
- Little projects (2006)
- People of love (2006)
- Bab Al-Hara (2006–2015)
- Prisoner of revenge (2007)
- House of my grandfather (2008)
- Features of human beings (2008)
- Seraa Ala El Remal (2008)
- When ethics rebel (2008)
- Face of Justice (2008)
- Another life (2009)
- Summer cloud (2009)
- Our Story don't end (2012)
- 42 days (2016)

=== Films ===
- For all night (2009)
- 3000 Nights (2015)

=== Dubbing ===
- Çemberimde Gül Oya (2004) as Zarife'nin Gençliği
- Ihlamurlar Altında (2005–2007) as Filiz
- Asi (2007–2009) as Asi
- Gonulcelen (2010) as Hasret
