= Sabah Obaid =

Sabah Obaid (April 4, 1950 – February 23, 2013) was a Syrian television director and actor.

== Life ==
Obaid began his artistic career in 1960 at the United Arab Society for Literature and Arts. He entered the world of theater under the supervision of Abdel Fattah Rawas Qalaji.

During his career, he held several positions within the Artists Syndicate, including Director of the Syndicate's headquarters, a member of the Central Council, and Head of the Culture and Information Office. He then served as Syndicate President and was ranked as a First Artist in 1984. He was also a member of the People's Assembly during the ninth legislative session.

Throughout his artistic career, he participated in numerous television productions. He died on February 23, 2013, after a coma that lasted nearly a month following a stroke.

His most famous works include the series Al-Burkan, Al-Jawarih, and Memories of the Coming Time. He also participated in important plays, such as Al-Mutanabbi by Mansour Rahbani, In addition to a number of films.
