= Moatasem Al-Nahar =

Syrian actor

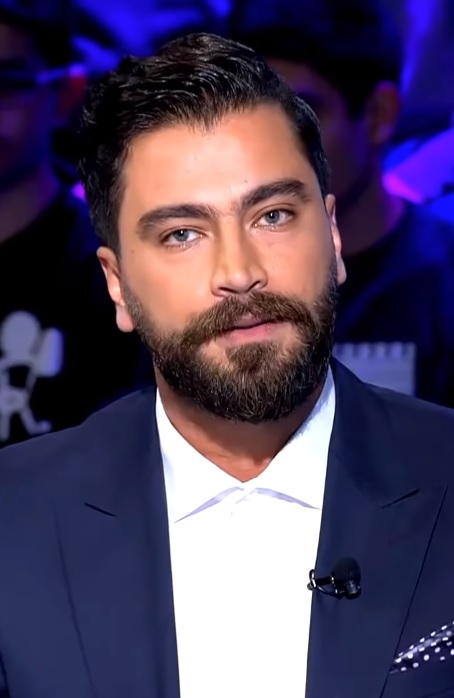
Moatasem al-Nahar at MTV Lebanon in 2020

Moatasem Al-Nahar (born December 6, 1984 in Al Duwadimi, Saudi Arabia) is a Syrian actor.Moatasem Al-Nahar won the Best Arab Actor Award at the 2024 Arab Satellite Channels Festival in Egypt.
