= Seraa Ala El Remal =

- Also known as: Wars on Sand; Conflict on the Sand
- Genre: Telenovela
- Created by: Hani Saadi
- Written by: Hani Saadi
- Directed by: Hatem Ali
- Country of origin: Syria
- Original language: Arabic
- No. of seasons: 1

Production
- Production locations: Dubai; Morocco; Syria
- Cinematography: M. Ahmed Ibrahim Ahmed
- Editor: Essam Sayda
- Camera setup: Digital 970
- Production company: Dubai Media

Original release
- Network: Dubai TV
- Release: 1 September 2008

Seraa Ala El Remal (Arabic: صراع على الرمال, lit. 'Wars on Sand', also known as "Conflict on the Sand") is a Syrian Arab soap opera/telenovela first aired on Dubai TV during Ramadan 2008. It was written by Palestinian writer Hani Saadi, directed by Hatem Ali, and produced by Dubai Media.

== Description ==
Seraa Ala El Remal chronicles the lives of around Arab Bedouin in the desert during the early eighteenth century, weaving the fates of different people gathered by love and dispersed by the war, with stories of love and horsemanship, loyalty, betrayal and revenge.

The most expensive Arabic TV series ever, the estimated cost to produce Seraa Ala El Remal was $6 million. It was filmed from October 2007 through February 2008 in Dubai, Morocco and Syria, with sites including Palmyra in Syria and Ouarzazate in Morocco.

== Cast ==
From Syria:

- Muna Wassef
- Taim Hasan
- Abdul Munim al-Ameri
- Abdel Rahman Abu Kassim
- Bassel Khayyat
- Rana Abyad
- Safa Sultan
- Joseph Nashef
- Vilda Sammour
- Khalid Al Qeesh
- Rana Jammoul
- Luma Ibrahim
- Jaber Joukdar
- Adham Murshed
- Muhannad Qatish
- Mohammad Al Rashi
- Hassan Oweiti
- Seif Eddin Subaie
- Zinati Qudsiya

From Jordan:

- Saba Mubarak
- Nadia Odeh
- Nidal Najem
- Anahid Fayad

From Morocco:

- Mohamed Meftah
