= Fajlit =

Fajlit فجليت
- Village
- Location in Syria
- Coordinates: 34°58′39″N 36°11′3″E
- Country: Syria
- Governorate: Tartus
- District: Duraykish District
- Subdistrict: Junaynet Ruslan

Population (2004)
  - Total: 2,220
- Time zone: UTC+3 (EET)
  - Summer (DST): UTC+2 (EEST)
- City Qrya Pcode: C5598

Fajlit (Arabic: فجليت) is a Syrian village in the Duraykish District in Tartous Governorate. According to the Syria Central Bureau of Statistics (CBS), Fajlit had a population of 2,220 in the 2004 census.
