= Hatem Ali =

Syrian actor (1962–2020)

Hatem Ali حاتم علي
- Born: 2 June 1962; Fiq, Syria
- Died: 29 December 2020 (aged 58); Cairo, Egypt
- Occupations: Actor, Film and Television director
- Years active: 1988–2020
- Notable work: Al-Taghreba al-Falastenya, Salah Al-deen, and Omar TV series
- Spouse: Dala’ al-Rahby (m. 1990)
- Children: 3

Hatem Ali (Arabic: حاتم علي; 2 June 1962 – 29 December 2020) was a Syrian television and cinema director, writer and actor.

== Biography ==
Ali was born in Fiq, Golan Heights, then his family was forced to move to Damascus after Israel occupied that region. He graduated from the Higher Institute of Dramatic Arts in 1986.

He's best known for his work on the TV series Al-Taghreba al-Falastenya, Salah Al-deen, and Omar TV series. Ali gained acceptance in theater arts, and worked as a teacher of Acting in the Higher Institute of Dramatic Arts. He also worked on and produced several other Western movies such as Peace By Chocolate, which earned him wider recognition overseas.

He died on 29 December 2020, at the age of 58, in Cairo, Egypt, after suffering a heart attack. He was buried in the Bab al-Saghir cemetery in Damascus. His final acting appearance before his death was in the Canadian film Peace by Chocolate.

== Filmography ==
=== Cinema ===
Cinematic films directed by Ali include:

- Al-Layl al-Taweel (The long night) (starring the Tunisian actress Anissa Daoud)
- Al Oshak (The Lovers)
- Shaghaf (Passion)

=== TV series director ===
Ali has directed numerous TV series, among them are:

- Safar (Traveling)
- Al Fosoul Al Arbaa'a (The Four Seasons) (first and second parts)
- Maraya 98
- Maraya 99
- Aelati Wa Ana (My Family And I) (2000)
- Al Zier Salem (2000)
- Salah Al Din (2001) a series about Salah Al Din
- Sakr Quraish (Quraish Hawk) (2002)
- Rabea Qurtoba (Córdoba Spring) (2003)
- Al-Taghreba al-Falastenya (2003)
- Ahlam Kabiera (Big Dreams) (2004)
- Molouk Al Tawaef (2005)
- Asey Addame' (Hard To Loosen A Tear) (2005)
- Ala Toul Al Ayam (All The Days) (2006)
- Al Malek Farouk (King Farouk) (2007)
- Seraa Ala El Remal (2008)
- Omar (2012)
- Alam Hemra (2014)
- Al-Arrab - Nadi El-Sharq (The Godfather - Orient's club) (TV series) (2015)
- Al-Arrab - Tahet El-Hezam (The Godfather- Under the Belt) part 2 (TV series) (2016)
- Orkidea (2017)

=== As a TV series writer ===
Ali wrote scripts for the following series:

- Al-Camera Al-Khafiya (The Hidden Camera 1995) with Dalaa El-Rahbi
- Muaziek
- Qous Qazah (Rainbow)
- Al Qelaa (The Castle)

=== As an actor ===
Series starring Hatem Ali as an actor include:

- Daerat Al Nar (Circle of Fire)
- Hegrat Al Qalb Ila Al Qalb
- Al Gawareh
- Al Ragol S (Mr. S)
- Abou Kamel
- Al Ragol al akhir
- Al Nissya
- Qaws kozah
- Nawar
- Hal how alhob
- Al Khochkhach
- Bent Aldora
- Assey El Damaa
- Taht al ardh
- Al arrab 1 and 2
- Ma btikhles hikayatna
- Peace by Chocolate

== Theater director ==
The following plays were directed by Hatem Ali:

- Mat Thalath Marrat (Dead Three Times)
- Ahl Al Hawa (People of Instincts)
- Albareha, Alyawm Waghadan (Yesterday, Today And Tomorrow)

== Bibliography ==
Ali also wrote the following books:

- Mawt Modares Al Tariekh Al Agouz (Death of The Old History Teacher)
- Hadath Wama Lam Yahdouth (What Happened And What Didn't)
- Tholatheyet Al Hesar (Blockade trilogy)

== Awards ==
- Award for best direction, for the television movie Akher Al Lail (The Last Part of The Night). Cairo TV Festival.
- Award for best direction, for the TV series Safar (Traveling). Cairo TV Festival.
- First work golden award, for the TV series Al Zeir Salem. Bahrain festival.
- Silver award, for the TV series Maraya 98. Cairo TV Festival.
- Bronze award, for the TV series Al Fosoul Al Arbaa'a (The Four Seasons). Bahrain festival
- Golden award for best direction, for the TV series Salah Al Din. Cairo TV Festival.
- Award for best direction, for Salah Al Din. Tunisia festival.
- Award for best direction, for the TV series Sakr Quraish (Quraish Hawk). Cairo TV Festival.
- Award for best direction, for the TV series Al Malek Farouk (The King Farouk). Cairo TV Festival
- Silver work award, for the TV series Ala Toul Al Ayam (All The Days). Tunisia festival.
- Adonia award for the best director for the year 2004, for the series Al Taghreba Al Felasteniya.
- Adonia award for the best director for the year 2005, for the series Molouk Al Tawaef.
- Silver work award, for the series Molouk Al Tawaef. Tunisia festival.
