= Rafiq Subaie =

Syrian actor, writer, and director

- Born: 9 February 1930; Damascus, Syria
- Died: 5 January 2017 (aged 86); Damascus, Syria
- Occupation(s): Actor, writer, director
- Years active: 1967–2017
- Children: Aamer, Saifuddin

Rafiq Subaie (Arabic: رفيق السبيعي; 9 February 1930 – 5 January 2017) was a Syrian actor, writer and director. He appeared in A Memory of a Night of Love (1973).

== Career ==
Subaie was born in one of the oldest districts of old Damascus and as an actor contributed to Syrian drama. He was well known for acting alongside Egyptian leading actor Salah Zulfikar in Memory of a Night of Love (1973). Subaie is also known by the name "Abu Sayyah", that of a character he played in plays and television series.

== Selected filmography ==
- 1967 – "Makalib Ghawar", actor, comedy series
- 1973 – "Memory of a Night of Love", actor, Syrian film
- 2013 – "Amar el Sham", actor, Syrian drama
