= Walid Saif =

Palestinian writer

- وليد سيف
- Born: Tulkarem, the West Bank, Palestine
- Known for: writing many Arabic TV series
- Notable work: Al-Taghriba Al-Filistinia; Omar; Salah Al-deen Al-Ayyobi

Waleed Saif (Arabic: وليد سيف; born in 1948) is a Palestinian-Jordanian poet, short storywriter, television drama writer, playwright, critic, researcher, and academic.

== Origin, study and life ==
Walid Saif was born in Tulkarem city in the West Bank, Palestine, and received a BA in Arabic language and literature from the University of Jordan. He received his doctorate in linguistics from the School of Oriental and African Studies at the University of London in 1975. After that, he worked as a lecturer at the Department of Arabic at the University of Jordan for three years before leaving the department to work as a writer for television drama. He has worked in the Syrian TV drama.

== Career ==
Saif worked since 1987 as a director of educational production at Al-Quds Open University, which helped set up its preparatory programs. Besides academia, he employed his background by turning to nonfiction drama, compiling and screenwriting works about many major Arab and Muslim events and figures. His repertoire includes plays, series, and film. One of his books, The Long Path, was adapted in a TV series depicting the lives of successive generations of a Palestinian farming family during and after the Nakba. Saif authored Saladin, Omar ibn al-Khattab, and others.

== Filmography ==
- Al-Taghriba Al-Filistinia (TV Series)
- Omar (TV series)
- Salah Al-deen Al-Ayyobi (TV series)
- "The Al-Andalus Quartet"
  - Saqr Quraish (TV Series)
  - Rabee Qurtuba (TV Series)
  - Mulook ut-Tawaif (TV Series)
  - Akhir Ayyam Gharnata (planned)
