= Juliet Awwad =

Jordanian actress and director

- Born: Juliet Nickogos Yacoub Haobian; July 7, 1951 (age 74); Amman, Jordan
- Occupation: Actress • Director
- Spouse: Jamil Awwad

Juliet Awwad (Arabic: جولييت عوّاد) or Juliet Nickogos Yacoub Hacobian (Arabic: جولييت نيكوغوس يعقوب هاكوبيان) (born July 7, 1951 in Amman, Jordan) is a Jordanian actress and director of Armenian descent. She is recognized as one of the most famous Jordanian drama actresses.

== Career ==
Awwad was born in Amman, and earned her Bachelor's Degree in Acting and Directing in the former Soviet Union in 1972, and a Higher Diploma in Children Theater. Al-Gha'eb was her debut in the theater in 1974, and in the next year, she participated in her first TV series Ras Al-Ain. She also worked as a director in children theater in Culture and Arts Authority from 1972 to 1978 with her husband Jameel Awwad.

== Filmography ==
=== Television ===
Title	Original title	Year	Role
Al-Eqaab wa As-Saqr	العقاب والصقر		
Al-Fukahah fe Al-Turath Al-Araby	الفكاهة في التراث العربي		
Al-Insaan Marratayn	الإنسان مرتين		
Al-Tawaheen (Windmills)	الطواحين		
Al-Tajroba	التجربة		
Abna'a Adh-Dhaya'	أبناء الضياع		
Baqaya Hotam	بقايا حطام		
Bab El-Aamood	باب العامود	1969	
Al-Fakh	الفخ	1970	
Abu-Firas Al-Hamadany	أبو فراس الحمداني	1979	
Shams Al-Aghwaar	شمس الأغوار	1981	
Qarya Bela Suqoof	قريه بلا سقوف	1982	Maleeha
Tarfah bin Al-Abd	طرفة بن العبد	1982	Warda
Duroob La Taltaqy	دروب لا تلتقي	1986	
Wajh Az-Zamaan	وجه الزمان	1988	Nasra
Khatawat Nahw Al-Mustaheel	خطوات نحو المستحيل	1988	
Huboob Ar-Reeh	هبوب الريح	1989	Rasheel
Al-Hatab wa An-Nar	الحطب والنار	1991	
Al-Kaf wa Al-Mekhraz	الكف والمخرز	1992	Zuhoor
Qamar wa Sahar	قمر وسحر	1998	
Ors Al-Saqr	عرس الصقر	1998	
Al-Manseyyah	المنسية	2000	
Al-Mathal Al-Badawy	المثل البدوي	2001	
As-Seqayah	السقاية	2001	Umm Kamel
Al-Bahth Ann Saladin	البحث عن صلاح الدين	2001	Holy Maryam
Khatt An-Nehaya	خط النهاية	2003	
Feras Bany Marawan	فارس بني مروان	2004	Asma'a
At-Taghreeba Al-Phalasteneyyah	التغريبة الفلسطينية	2004	Umm Ahmad
Namr bin Odwan	نمر بن عدوان	2007	
Abu Ja'far Al-Mansoor	أبو جعفر المنصور	2008	Hend bint Aby Obayda
Neeran Al-Bawady	نيران البوادي	2008	
Waraq Al-Ward	ورق الورد	2009	
Abwab Al-Ghaim	أبواب الغيم	2010	
Omar	عمر	2012	Al-Khansa'a
Ru'ood Al-Mazn	رعود المزن	2014	
Thahab wa Awda	ذهاب وعودة	2015	
Hanaya Al-Ghaith	حنايا الغيث	2015	
Al-Dam'a Al-Hamra'a	الدمعة الحمراء	2016	
Al-Eqaab wa Al-Efra'a	العقاب والعفراء	2017	

=== Films ===
Title	Original title	Year	Role
Mamlaket An-Naml (Kingdom of Ants)	مملكة النمل	2012	
