= Bassam Kousa =

Syrian film and TV actor (born 1954)

Bassam Kousa بسام كوسا
- Born: 7 November 1954 (age 71); Aleppo, Syria
- Occupation: Actor
- Years active: 1982 – present
- Notable work: Bab al-Hara (2006) Old Times (2000)
- Spouse: Thawra Alyoussef
- Children: 2

Bassam Kousa (Arabic: بسام كوسا; born 7 November 1954) is a Syrian film and TV actor. He had notable roles in television series including Bab al-Hara and Old Times.

== Personal life ==
Kousa is a Sculpture graduate from the Faculty of Fine Arts. He is married to Thawra Alyoussef and has two children.

== Filmography ==
=== Selected series ===
Year	Name	Genre
1999–2002	Four Seasons	Comedy, Drama, Family
1993	Al-Kompars	Comedy, Drama, Romance
1993	Abnaa' Wa'umahat	Drama
1995	The Survivor	Drama, History
1998	Turab al-Ghurabaa	
1998	Nassim al-Roh	Drama, Romance, Music
2002	The Box of Life	Drama
2004	Ahlam Kabireh	Drama
2004–2007	Era of Madness (Asr Al Junoon)	Drama
2006	The Wait	Drama
2009	Zaman Al'ar	Drama
2010	Behind the Sun	Drama
2011	Al Sarab	Drama
2014	Al Haqaeb	Comedy, Drama
2016	Solitaire	Comedy, Drama, Romance
2016	Domino	Drama
2016	Mozneboon abreya'	Crime
2017	Al Raboss	Horror
2017	Shababeek: Windows	Comedy, Drama, Romance
2018	Doubt	Drama
2020	Sirr – Secret	Crime, Mystery, Romance
2020–2021 (Two seasons)	Souq Al Harrir	History
2024	Taj	Action, Drama, History
2024	Mal Al Qabban	Drama

|2025 || Kanoun || Drama |}
