= Al-Ababeed =

Syrian television series

- العبابيد
- Genre: Historical fiction
- Created by: Bassam Al-Mulla
- Starring: Raghda; Salloum Haddad; Muna Wassef; Assaad Feddah; May Skaf; Caresse Bashar; Samar Kokash
- Country of origin: Syria
- Original language: Arabic
- No. of episodes: 22

Original release
- Release: 1997

Al-Ababeed (Arabic: العبابيد, lit. 'The Anarchy') was a Syrian soap opera and historical fiction centered around the 3rd-century Syrian Palmyrene Empire which aired in the Ramadan season of 1997.

In the show, the role of Zenobia of Palmyra is played by famous Syrian actress Raghda. Zenobia's struggle against the Roman Empire is used allegorically to represent the struggles of the Palestinian people to gain self determination.

The series was watched and admired by millions all across the Arab world.

== Cast ==
The cast was as follows:

- Raghda as Queen Zenobia
- Abdul Rahman Al Rashi as Emperor Aurelian
- Salloum Haddad as Elahbel
- Rashid Assaf as Malko
- Muna Wassef as Qamra
- Assaad Feddah as al-Munzer
- May Skaf as Taima
- Caresse Bashar as Anagheem
- Samar Kokash as Najda
- Nizar Sharaby as Cassius Longinus
- Bassam Kousa as Amrisha
- Abdul Hakim Quotaifan as Zabbai
- Hatem Ali as Moqimo
- Hani El-Romani as the priest
- Adnan Barakat as al-Numan
- Sabah Jazairi as Nargese
- Ahmed Rafea as Emilius
- Yassin Arnaaot as Claudian
- Adham El Molla as Muhareb
- Laila Jabr as Dala
- Mohammed al Rashi as Waeel
- Abd el-Rahman Abo el-Qaem as Aylami
- Fadwa Mohsen as Mabruka
- Hossam Tahsen Beek as the Queen's messenger
- Hala Shawkat as Malko's Mother
- Saiful Din Subayie as Naheel
- Abed Fahed as Ma'ani
- Zeyad Saad as Nasr el-Lat
- Maher Salibiy as Yamleko

== See also ==
- List of Syrian television series
