= Samar Kokash =

Syrian actress (born 1972)

- Born: August 26, 1972 (age 54); Damascus, Syria
- Occupations: Actress, voice actress
- Years active: 1994–2013, 2017–present

Samar Kokash (Arabic: سَمر كُوكشَ; born August 26, 1972) is a Syrian actress.

== Biography ==
Kokash graduated from the Higher Institute of Theatrical Arts in Syria in 1995. She participated in many of the works in the theater, radio and television. She also worked in the dubbing. She retired from the field of art and wore the veil and say, artistic appearance. She is the daughter of director Aladdin Kokash and actress Malak Sukkar.

She was imprisoned from late 2013 to February 2017 by the Syrian regime during the Syrian Civil War.

== Filmography ==
=== Dubbing roles ===
- The Adventures of Lolo the Penguin (Venus Centre version)
- Adventures of Sonic the Hedgehog (Venus Centre version)
- The All New Popeye Hour – Olive Oyl (second voice)
  - Popeye and Son – Olive Oyl
- Bakugan Battle Brawlers – Rawya (Runo Misaki), Jamal (Osamu Jō)
  - Bakugan Battle Brawlers: New Vestroia – Rawya (Runo Misaki), Baron Leltoy
  - Bakugan: Gundalian Invaders – Ren Krawler
- Bakusō Kyōdai Let's & Go!! MAX – Goki Ichimonji
- Bartok the Magnificent – Additional Voices
- Battle B-Daman – Tain (Tsubame Tsubakura), Cain (Enjyu)
  - Battle B-Daman: Fire Spirits! – Tain (Tsubame Tsubakura), Cain (Enjyu)
- Ben 10 – Gwen Tennyson
- Beyblade – Hiromi Tachibana
  - Beyblade: Metal Fusion – Yu Tendo
- Black Cat – Kyoko Kirisaki
- Chiquititas – Veronica "Vero" Cisneros
- Cyborg Kuro-chan – Mikun
- Detective Conan – Ran Mōri
  - Detective Conan: The Time-Bombed Skyscraper – Ran Mōri
  - Detective Conan: The Fourteenth Target – Ran Mōri
  - Detective Conan: The Last Wizard of the Century – Ran Mōri
  - Detective Conan: Captured in Her Eyes – Ran Mōri
  - Detective Conan: Zero the Enforcer – Ran Mōri
- Digimon Adventure – Mimi Tachikawa (first voice), Gabumon (first voice)
- Dragon Ball – Son Goku
  - Dragon Ball Z – Son Gohan
- Fushigi Yûgi – Miaka Yūki
- Golden Warrior Gold Lightan
- Hamtaro – Laura Haruna (Hiroko Haruna), Snoozer (Neteru-kun), Cappy (Kaburu-kun)
  - Hamtaro: Adventures in Ham-Ham Land – Laura Haruna (Hiroko Haruna), Snoozer (Neteru-kun), Cappy (Kaburu-kun)
  - Hamtaro: The Captive Princess – Laura Haruna (Hiroko Haruna), Snoozer (Neteru-kun), Cappy (Kaburu-kun)
  - Hamtaro: Ham Ham Grand Prix - The Miracle of Aurora Valley – Laura Haruna (Hiroko Haruna), Snoozer (Neteru-kun), Cappy (Kaburu-kun)
  - Hamtaro: The Mysterious Ogre's Picture Book Tower - Laura Haruna (Hiroko Haruna), Snoozer (Neteru-kun), Cappy (Kaburu-kun)
- Horseland – Sarah Whitney
- Idaten Jump – Makoto Shido
- Idol Densetsu Eriko – Asami Seyama
- Inuyasha – Mayu Ikeda
- Iron Kid – Violet (uncredited)
- The Kidsongs Television Show – Triskin Potter, Alexandra Picatto
- The Magic School Bus (Venus Centre version)
- Les Misérables: Shōjo Cosette – Gavroche (first voice)
- Monster Rancher – Holly
- One Piece – Nami, Roronoa Zoro (child)
- Opti-Morphs - KINSON
- Pappyland
- The Powerpuff Girls – Tamara (Bubbles) (Venus Centre version)
- Pretty Rhythm – Sonata Amamiya (Venus Centre version)
- Ranma ½ – Shampoo
- Sakura Wars – Iris Chateaubriand
- Strawberry Shortcake
  - Frutillita
  - Strawberry Shortcake: The Sweet Dreams Movie
- Super Little Fanta Heroes (Venus Centre version)
- Super Wings - Jett (Venus Centre version)
- Tama and Friends – Tama
- Tsuyoshi Shikkari Shinasai
- VS Knight Ramune & 40 Fire – Baba Lamunade
- Wish Kid – Nicholas "Nick" McClary
- Rainbow Ruby - Ramon
- Horton Hears a Who! (Classical Arabic Version)
