= May Skaf =

Syrian actress and activist

May Skaf مي سكاف
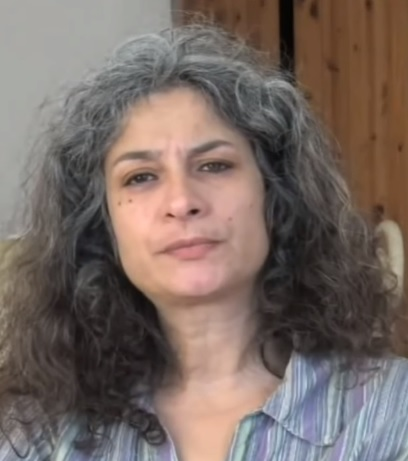
- May Skaf in December 2017
- Born: April 13, 1969; Damascus, Syria
- Died: July 23, 2018 (aged 49); Dourdan, France
- Occupations: Actress, activist
- Years active: 1991–2018
- Spouse: Taher Alzobbi
- Children: 1
- Relatives: Dima Wannous (maternal cousin); Saadallah Wannous (uncle-in-law)

May Skaf (Arabic: مي سكاف) (April 13, 1969 – July 23, 2018) was a Syrian actress and activist. She began her career in 1991. Skaf acted in many series and movies such as Al-Ababeed in 1997, Maraya in 1998 and Omar in 2012. Skaf was known for her opposition to Syrian regime, she was labeled The rebellious artist, The Free artist and Revolution icon. She died in July 2018 in Dourdan, France from a heart attack.

== Early life and career ==
Skaf was born to a Christian family in Damascus, She studied French literature at Damascus University. Her dad was Syrian and her mom Lebanese. Skaf started to act in many French plays, when in 1991 she got the attention of director Maher Keddo, who chose her for the main role in his film Sahil aljehat (Neigh of direction). She worked with director Abdellatif Abdelhamid who offered her a role in his movie Rise of rain in 1995. Her first role in TV was in A crime in memory in 1992. Skaf became famous from her breakout role in Al-Ababeed (The Anarchy) in 1997. She acted in many other series like Albawasel (The Heroes) in 2000, Bit alelah (House of family) in 2002, Ash-Shatat (The diaspora) in 2003, Ahel algharam (People of love) in 2006. She portrayed the medieval Arab woman Hind bint Utbah in Omar in 2012, and as Tawq asphalt (Asphalt collar) in 2014. Her last role was in Orchedea in 2017. She participated in the Syrian artists association in 2001, but she was suspended in 2015 for not making payments to the association.

== Personal life and activism ==
She was formerly married and divorced; she had one son, Judd Alzobbi. Since the beginning of Syrian revolution of 2011, she participated in many protests against Bashar al-Assad. She was arrested and released in August 2011. In 2012, she left Syria secretly for Lebanon then to Jordan, where she immigrated to France with her son in 2013. She accused Syrian police of rape when she was under arrest. The government took possession of her house in Jaramana in late 2014 after she fled the country.

== Death ==
On July 23, 2018, her son watched Skaf die at her bed. Her family doubted the cause of death was due to natural reasons. A couple of days before her death she had traveled to Beirut, which led to speculation that Hezbollah may have had a role in her death. However, the official autopsy concluded that she died from a heart attack. Her maternal cousin Dima Wannous said that she died from a stroke, she also said that she suffered from a great deal of frustration for what happened in Syria.

== Works ==
=== Series ===
- Crime in memory (1992)
- Partly cloudy (1996)
- The Anarchy (1996)
- Silk khan 2 (1998)
- Mirrors 8 (1998)
- The castles (1998)
- Seat in garden (1998)
- Fire shaft (1999)
- The knights (1999)
- The heroes (2000)
- House of family (2001)
- For what talking (2001)
- Migrating spirits (2002)
- Spring of Cordoba (2003)
- The Diaspora (2003)
- The Apostates (2005)
- The Station 30 (2005)
- The Houri (2005)
- The sun rise again (2005)
- Last days of Yamama (2006)
- Dew of days (2006)
- Echo of spirit (2006)
- People of love (2006)
- This world (2007)
- Love biography (2007)
- Narcissus flower (2008)
- Me and my sisters 2 (2008)
- The dangerous seasons (2008)
- Me and my sisters 3 (2009)
- The spirit restricitions (2010)
- The lift (2011)
- Omar (2012)
- Birth from waist 3 (2013)
- We waiting (2013)
- Asphalt collar (2015)
- Promise of stranger (2017)
- Orchedea (2017)
- Hope (2017)
- We are all Syrians (2017)

=== Films ===
- Neigh of directions (1993)
- Rise of rain (1995)
- Half mg nicotin (2007)
- Damascus, Smile of Sadness (2008)
- Crypt (2017)

=== Stage ===
- The death and the virgin (2003)
- Ship of love (2007)
- The Tigers (2016)
