= Raghda =

Syrian actress

Raghda رغدة
- Born: Raghda Mahmoud Na'na; November 26, 1957 (age 68); Aleppo, Syria
- Occupations: Actress, Activist
- Years active: 1982–present
- Known for: Role as Queen Zenobia
- Notable work: Al-Ababeed
- Spouse: Abdallah al Kahhal (divorced)
- Children: 4

Raghda Mahmoud Na'na (Arabic: رغدة محمود نعنع, born 18 July 1957), better known by the mononym Raghda, is a Syrian actress known for working in Egyptian cinema. She played Queen Zenobia of Palmyra in the 1997 Syrian soap opera Al-Ababeed. Raghda currently resides in Egypt.

== Early life and education ==
She grew up in the Syrian city of Aleppo where her father's house included 14 children. Raghda enrolled at the Arabic language division of a literature faculty in Aleppo University.

== Career ==
She began her career in Egyptian cinema, her film debut was in; (The Peacock - Al Tawoos) 1982 with Salah Zulfikar and wote a successful duet with Ahmed Zaki in four films and a duet with the Syrian artist Duraid Lahham through the film (Borders - Al Hodood) 1984 and (The report - Al-Taqreer) 1986. She has also participated in (Sorry for Bothering - Asef lil Izaag) 1986, “Istabl A’ntar” (“A’ntar’s Stables”), “Al Dawaer Al Mughlaqa” (“Exclusive Circles”), “La Ilah Ila Allah” (“There is no God But God”), and (Kaboria - Crabs) 1990. Her well known theatrical performances include “Saloumy” and “Al Rahaen” (“The Hostages”).

One of her most well known roles whatever, was playing Queen Zenobia in "Al-Ababeed" (The Anarchy). She later worked as an announcer on “Garrat Al Qammar” (“Neighbor to the Moon”) in 2002.

== Personal life ==
Raghda was briefly married to Abdallah al Kahhal, a Syrian businessman and fellow Aleppine, but they were divorced some years later. She has 4 children.

=== Political views ===
Raghda is a known vocal supporter of Syrian president Bashar al-Assad. Her father, who opposes Assad, has been allegedly abducted by rebel groups in March 2013 due to his daughter's political allegiance.

On the 20th of March 2013 Raghda, who recited poetry supporting Syrian president Bashar al-Assad and criticizing radical Islamists of the middle east, was attacked by six Islamist radicals attending the conference who began throwing fire extinguishers at her and the attendees attempting to rescue her.

She is interested in Arab issues and advocates for the Al-Aqsa uprising. She participated in breaking the siege on Iraq, which lasted for 13 years. She also went to Beirut in the July 2006 war under bombardment and stayed with the displaced in the gardens
