= List of Hamtaro episodes =

The first English DVD volume

The anime series Hamtaro based on the Hamtaro children's book series by Ritsuko Kawai. It was directed by Osamu Nabeshima and produced by ShoPro, Shogakukan Music & Digital Entertainment and TV Tokyo. The series involves the adventure of a brave and childlike hamster named Hamtaro, with his Ham-Ham friends. It began airing in Japan on July 7, 2000. Hamtaro has been aired throughout the world on many stations.

Hamtaro 1.1 – 1.12 were released in Australia, with three episodes on each DVD - at present, there are no plans for further releases for the other episodes. Hamtaro Volume 1 – Volume 3, with four episodes on each DVD were released in Germany by RTL2. In the U.S., episodes were released on DVD by Viz Video. In Singapore, Hamtaro DVD box sets are available with 4 discs of the first season (26 episodes) with six episodes on each disc. There are also boxed sets of 27 episodes with six to seven episodes on each of four discs. Seasons 2-4 are released that way.

The first 105 episodes of the series received an English dub, while the remaining 191 were left undubbed.

== Episodes ==
=== Season 1 ===
No.	Title	Original release date	English air date
1	"Hamtaro"; Transliteration: "Tottoko Toujou! Hamutaro" (Japanese: とっとこ登場!ハム太郎)	July 7, 2000	June 3, 2002
A 10-year-old girl named Laura, along with her parents, her dog Brandy and hamster Hamtaro, moves into their new house. After their arrival in the new house, Hamtaro gets out of his cage and goes outside, where he meets a hamster named Oxnard. Both Hamtaro and Oxnard fall underground, only to meet a hamster named Boss and his house. They go outside and sing a song for a female hamster named Bijou. However, after the dancing performance, Hamtaro notices Bijou winking at him, signaling her crush on him. Meanwhile, Laura and her father are walking around the city, where Laura meets Kana and buys a journal.
2	"The Ham-Ham Clubhouse"; Transliteration: "Tottoko Tsukuru Yo! Chika Hausu" (Japanese: とっとこ作るよ!地下ハウス)	July 14, 2000	June 4, 2002
Boss introduces Hamtaro and Oxnard to his friends, Pashmina, Penelope, Howdy and Dexter. On a rainy day, a cat appears and attacks Penelope, but Hamtaro defeats it. Boss shows the gang his house, only to find a sleeping hamster named Snoozer. As the Ham-Hams decide to convert Boss' house to the Ham-Ham Clubhouse, Laura transfers to her school and meet her new teacher Mr. Yoshi and some classmates, Kana, Travis, Kylie, and June; the latter two of which are owners of Penelope and Pashmina.
3	"Calling all Ham-Hams!"; Transliteration: "Tottoko Atsumare! Hamuchanzu" (Japanese: とっとこ集まれ!ハムちゃんず)	July 21, 2000	June 5, 2002
Pashmina and Penelope introduce their friends Maxwell, Panda, Sandy, and Cappy to the other Ham-Hams. While playing at the Ham-Ham Clubhouse, Howdy and Dexter start arguing, with the Ham-Hams make a mess of the entire Clubhouse much to their annoyance, only to be booted out of there by Boss. Boss feels he is alone and wants the other Ham-Hams to return, so they decide to do so. Meanwhile, Laura gets A and she tries to tell her parents, but they are too busy so Laura tells them about that in the evening after their return.
4	"Come Out, Bijou!"; Transliteration: "Tottoko Tobidase! Ribon-chan" (Japanese: とっとこ飛び出せ!リボンちゃん)	July 28, 2000	June 6, 2002
Boss wants to see Bijou at the Ham-Ham Clubhouse, but Bijou is reluctant to go because she thinks that if her owner, Maria, returns before her, she will be sad. Bijou learns she will return before her owner and finally arrives in the Clubhouse. Meanwhile, Laura accidentally gets splashed while carrying water. Travis gives her his towel and Laura dries off before returning the towel.
5	"Diamonds of Sugar (aka: Diamonds of Sugar! It's Raining Diamonds!)"; Transliteration: "Tottoko Ippai! Konpeitou" (Japanese: とっとこいっぱい!コンペイトウ)	August 4, 2000	June 7, 2002
Laura introduces Hamtaro to konpeito-shaped candies called "Diamonds of Sugar". Boss says that the candies are the same things as stars in the sky. The Ham-Hams want to catch the supposed Diamonds of Sugar from the sky, unaware of the stars' actual distance from Earth until they spot a shooting star. Meanwhile, Laura and Kana's families are having a garden party and watch the stars too.
6	"First Time at the Beach"; Transliteration: "Tottoko Iku Noda! Hajimeteno Umi!" (Japanese: とっとこ行くのだ!はじめての海!)	August 11, 2000	June 10, 2002
Laura's family goes to the beach, but they cannot take Hamtaro because hamsters are afraid of water. Despite this, the Ham-Hams go to the beach by hiding in the family car. Later, a storm breaks while Laura and Kana are away from the main beach. The Ham-Hams use Laura's hat to get her father's attention and successfully lead him to the girls.
7	"A Summer Festival Adventure!"; Transliteration: "Tottoko Bouken! Natsumatsuri!" (Japanese: とっとこ冒険!夏祭り!)	August 18, 2000	June 11, 2002
During Summer Festival, the Ham-Hams learn from Maxwell that fireworks will appear on the sky at night. Pashmina gets separated from the Ham-Hams to find the flowers and climbs to the roof of the Temple of the Sun, getting lost in the process. The Ham-Hams save her and watch the fireworks. Meanwhile, while Laura and Kana are walking around the festival, Kana gets separated from Laura. Laura sees Travis and goes to find Kana, then watch the fireworks.
8	"The Sunflower Field"; Transliteration: "Tottoko Asobu Yo! Himawari Hatake" (Japanese: とっとこ遊ぶよ!ひまわり畑)	August 25, 2000	June 12, 2002
Laura's family and Boss go to visit their grandmother who lives near a sunflower field. Hamtaro runs away from Laura as she paints with her grandmother and wanders around the field with Boss, so Laura's family discovers his disappearance and looks for him everywhere. Hamtaro finally returns to Laura. Eventually, Hamtaro and Boss share the story with the other Ham-Hams.
9	"Much Ado about School!"; Transliteration: "Tottoko Gakkou! Taisa Wagi" (Japanese: とっとこ学校!大さわぎ)	September 1, 2000	June 13, 2002
Laura and Kana return to school as summer vacation ends with Hamtaro, Oxnard, and Boss joining them. Hamtaro decides to create a hamster school, where Maxwell is appointed teacher, but the Ham-Hams quickly grow bored. Afterwards, he tries coaching them in soccer, resulting a fight between them. They finally try a music class and like it.
10	"Jingle, the Wanderer"; Transliteration: "Tottoko Sasurau! Tongari-kun" (Japanese: とっとこさすらう!トンガリくん)	September 8, 2000	June 14, 2002
Laura takes a floppy disk to her father's office. Hamtaro, Oxnard, and Penelope are trapped inside her purse and Oxnard drops his sunflower seed. The disk falls from Laura's purse, only to find the sunflower seed and meet a hamster named Jingle with a guitar. Upon arriving at her father's office, Laura discovers the disk has disappeared and looks for it with her father. Hamtaro, Oxnard, Penelope, and Jingle find the disk and put it in Laura's pocket, where her father finds it.
11	"The Wise Elder-Ham"; Transliteration: "Tottoko Sugoizo! Chourou-Hamu" (Japanese: とっとこすごいぞ!長老ハム)	September 15, 2000	June 17, 2002
Laura's grandmother visits and is sad she has lost her friend. Laura decides to find her grandmother's friend. The Ham-Hams enlist the help of Elder-Ham in the search. With their help, Laura's grandmother's friend is finally found and with her reuniting with her friend.
12	"Bijou is in Danger!"; Transliteration: "Tottoko Taihen! Ribon-chan" (Japanese: とっとこ大変!リボンちゃん)	September 22, 2000	June 18, 2002
Bijou gets lost in the city, only to meet an alley cat and her kittens. The Ham-Hams try to save her but without success. Meanwhile, Laura buys a book named "The Adventures of Hamkins", where she and Kana find the cats and fawn over the kittens, allowing the Ham-Hams to escape.
13	"Let's Dance, Sandy!"; Transliteration: "Tottoko Odoru yo! Torahamu-chan" (Japanese: とっとこ踊るよ!トラハムちゃん)	September 29, 2000	June 19, 2002
As Elder-Ham's Sunflower Seed Harvest Festival approaches, Sandy claims that she has a crush on Maxwell because he reminds her so much of her twin brother. Sandy asks Hamtaro to find out if Maxwell feels the same about her, where Hamtaro cannot do so. However, Elder-Ham remarks how much Sandy looks like a boy hamster that he knew. The Ham-Hams vow to find Sandy's brother, leading directly into the next episode.
14	"The Search for Sandy's Brother"; Transliteration: "Tottoko Sagasuzo! Torahamu-kun" (Japanese: とっとこさがすぞ!トラハムくん)	October 6, 2000	June 20, 2002
Recalling the previous episode, Hamtaro and Oxnard locate Sandy's twin brother, Stan, owned by another instructor at Hillary's gym, and bring him back to the Clubhouse. To celebrate, the Ham-Hams decide to throw a surprise reunion party for Sandy. However, Sandy rebukes Stan for his flirtatious behavior.
15	"Bijou's Favorite Ribbon"; Transliteration: "Tottoko Taisetsu! Ribon Dechu" (Japanese: とっとこ大切!リボンでちゅ)	October 13, 2000	June 21, 2002
Cappy takes Bijou's ribbon for a game of "Blind Man's Bluff", but Bijou is upset with Hamtaro, so Snoozer comforts Bijou and convinces her to make up with Hamtaro. Hamtaro sprains his foot and Bijou wraps it with her ribbon. During school trip, Laura puts ribbons in her hair but Travis does not seem to notice them until he acknowledges her without the ribbons.
16	"Get Well, Laura!"; Transliteration: "Tottoko Roko-chan! Genki Ninaare" (Japanese: とっとこロコちゃん!元気になあれ)	October 20, 2000	June 24, 2002
Hamtaro wakes Laura up at night, making her late for school, with Boss having a stomachache. During P.E. class, Laura passes out and returns home early with a cold. Hamtaro blames himself for making Laura sick, but with the help of the Ham-Hams, they heal her.
17	"Hamtaro, the Super Sleuth!"; Transliteration: "Tottoko Meitantei! Hamutaro" (Japanese: とっとこ名探偵!ハム太郎)	October 27, 2000	June 25, 2002
The Ham-Hams' things are relocating themselves under Boss' bed. After Snoozer's pillow is stolen, Hamtaro eventually finds that the thief is Penelope, trying to put everything away in an attempt at responsibility. Meanwhile, Laura's things and those of her classmates have disappeared too, where the thief is revealed to be a bird.
18	"The Slipper Chase (aka: The Glass Slipper)"; Transliteration: "Tottoko Hashiru Zo! Garasu Nokutsu" (Japanese: とっとこ走るぞ!ガラスのくつ)	November 3, 2000	June 26, 2002
Laura goes to the spring concert play, Cinderella, but she forgets her second slipper and the Ham-Hams take it upon themselves to bring it to Laura before the play starts. Along the way, they encounter Jingle and some hostile chickens. After Jingle accidentally frightens the chickens away, the Ham-Hams deliver the slipper on time and enjoy the play.
19	"Panda's Ham-Ham Fun Park!"; Transliteration: "Tottoko Katsuyaku! Panda-kun" (Japanese: とっとこ活躍(かつやく)!パンダくん)	November 10, 2000	June 27, 2002
The Ham-Hams decide to build an amusement park under Panda's leadership, but Boss, Howdy, and Stan think it is impossible that Panda is just trying to impress the girls. Meanwhile, Laura's family goes to the amusement park, but the car machinery breaks down. Kana's family stops to help and Laura and Kana spend the day at the amusement park.
20	"The Snoozer Mystery!"; Transliteration: "Tottoko Nazo Dayo! Neteru-kun" (Japanese: とっとこ謎だよ!ねてるくん)	November 17, 2000	June 28, 2002
Snoozer gets lost and runs into a hamster named Omar who looks just like him. Omar sneaks into Kana's house to scare Oxnard before running into Snoozer. When the Ham-Hams find Snoozer and Omar, he goes back to his family that he left to explore the world.
21	"Courage, Cappy!"; Transliteration: "Tottoko Yuuki da! Kaburu-kun" (Japanese: とっとこ勇気だ!かぶるくん)	November 24, 2000	June 3, 2002
Cappy runs away from home and decides to live with Boss forever, leaving the other Ham-Hams worried. After Boss tells him about the hardships he must face as a field hamster, he decides to return to his owners who are looking for him. Meanwhile, Laura accidentally breaks Kana's sketch as Kana returns home early. When Laura visits Kana, she learns that Kana returned home early due to the latter catching a cold and creating many sketches while at home.
22	"Pashmina's Present"; Transliteration: "Tottoko Okuru Zo! Purezento" (Japanese: とっとこ贈るぞ!プレゼント)	December 1, 2000	June 4, 2002
Laura decides to buy a gift for Travis' birthday the next day. Seeing Laura trying to decide what to get, Hamtaro ignorantly proclaims to the Ham-Hams that it seems that tomorrow is the day to give a present to someone she cares about. Dexter and Howdy decide to give Pashmina a gift, then go to Hamtaro for help. After seeing Laura knitting a towel for Travis, Hamtaro suggests a handmade gift, eventually knitting Pashmina's cap and gloves. The glory they get from Pashmina for the presents is quickly taken away when Penelope gives Pashmina some sunflower seeds.
23	"Maxwell's Big Scoop!"; Transliteration: "Tottoko Toku da ne! Noppo-kun" (Japanese: とっとこ特ダネ!のっぽくん)	December 8, 2000	June 5, 2002
Maxwell decides to create a newspaper called The Ham-Ham Times after Hamtaro learns that Laura and Kana are making a newspaper for the school. They eventually reach a frozen over lake and start out towards an island on the lake. Maxwell faints after saving the Ham-Hams from a drainage hole, but he sees his rescue as the featured story in The Ham-Ham Times while walking.
24	"Hamtaro, Please come Home!"; Transliteration: "Tottoko Hashire! Hamutaro" (Japanese: とっとこ走れ!ハム太郎)	December 15, 2000	June 6, 2002
While walking with Laura, Hamtaro falls into a box on a transport truck in an attempt to save one of her ribbons but is taken away, making Laura depressed. Upon receiving help from a man and his dog, Hamtaro meets Jingle, a new hamster named Sabu, his bird Francoise, and Jingle's pig, Herbert. With their help, Hamtaro returns home, reuniting with Laura and making the Ham-Hams happy.
25	"Merry Christmas!"; Transliteration: "Tottoko Meri! Kurisumasu" (Japanese: とっとこメリー!クリスマス)	December 22, 2000	June 7, 2002
On Christmas, Boss and Snoozer want to get a gift from Santa. The Ham-Hams decide to help and everyone gets gifts from the hamster-Santa, Elder-Ham. Meanwhile, Laura wants a dollhouse for her gift and gets it.
26	"The Legend of the Courageous Hamtaro!"; Transliteration: "Tottoko Yuusha! Hamutaro Densetsu" (Japanese: とっとこ勇者!ハム太郎伝説)	December 29, 2000	June 10, 2002
Hamtaro and Laura dream about being a princess and a knight in a fairy tale. The prophet hamster (Elder-Ham) foretells the arrival of an evil magician and a brave knight. The brave knight (Hamtaro) arrives, but is immediately arrested on suspiscions of him being the magician. Oxnard and Bijou help Hamtaro escape, but he is subsequently turned to stone by the evil magician (Boss). Hamtaro is revived after a time and rides a "steed" (Brandy) through the sky and successfully defeats the magician.

=== Season 2 ===
No.	Title	Original release date	English air date
27	"The Snowball Fight!"; Transliteration: "Tottoko Genki Ni! Yukigassen" (Japanese: とっとこ元気に!雪合戦)	January 5, 2001	June 11, 2002
A snowstorm has just dumped snow onto the town, Hamtaro brings his friends out, with Boss and Stan competing. Later, everyone has a snowball fight, only stopped when Penelope is caught in a snowball. While skating with Kana, Laura has trouble with skating and Travis appears to help.
28	"The Amazing Auntie Viv"; Transliteration: "Tottoko Sugosugi! O Hamu Baasan" (Japanese: とっとこすごすぎ!おハムばあさん)	January 12, 2001	June 12, 2002
Elder Ham is reunited with Auntie Viv. Upon discovering which footrace Laura's class is about to partake in, Hamtaro decides to run the same race. Auntie Viv and Boss bicker about who will win the race and Boss eventually takes the lead. Meanwhile, during the race, Laura sprains her ankle, in which Boss goes back to check on Auntie Viv. Auntie Viv leaves after the race, making Boss sad to see her go.
29	"The Search for Dad's Glasses!"; Transliteration: "Tottoko Ou no da! Papa No Megane" (Japanese: とっとこ追うのだ!パパのメガネ)	January 19, 2001	June 13, 2002
Laura's father loses his glasses at the bus stop and the Ham-Hams must find the glasses before Monday. If not, Laura's father cannot go to his job and Hamtaro will not be able to leave the house. The Ham-Hams find glasses and attempt to bring them to Laura's father, but once the glasses are destroyed beyond repair, they turn out to be the wrong pair. Dexter takes the destroyed glasses and makes hamster-sized glasses for the Ham-Hams.
30	"Brandy's Big Race"; Transliteration: "Tottoko Don-chan! Dai Reisu" (Japanese: とっとこどんちゃん!大レース)	January 26, 2001	June 14, 2002
Laura's family take Brandy and the Ham-Hams to the dog race without knowing it. The Ham-Hams and Brandy accidentally get into the race after Brandy worries about embarrassing Laura. Upon saving a rabbit, they win after the rabbit and gets Brandy to chase it to the finish line.
31	"Boss is a Mom!"; Transliteration: "Tottoko Mama Dayo! Taisho-kun" (Japanese: とっとこママだよ!タイショーくん)	February 2, 2001	June 17, 2002
Boss meets a lost kitten and decides to be its mother. It is later revealed that cat belongs to one of Laura's classmates, Mia.
32	"Valentine's Day!"; Transliteration: "Tottoko Bikkuri! Barentain" (Japanese: とっとこびっくり!バレンタイン)	February 9, 2001	June 18, 2002
The Ham-Ham girls and Auntie Viv decide to give Valentine's Day gifts to their boyfriends, with Laura trying to give her own to Travis.
33	"Let's Cross the Rainbow!"; Transliteration: "Tottoko Wataro! Niji No Hashi" (Japanese: とっとこ渡ろう!虹の橋)	February 16, 2001	June 19, 2002
Bijou wants to see a rainbow and the Ham-Hams decide to find a rainbow for her. Meanwhile, Laura is upset because Kana was in the hospital during the time of rainbow's disappearance.
34	"Watching over Cute Penelope"; Transliteration: "Tottoko Kawaii! Chibimaru-chan" (Japanese: とっとこかわいい!ちび丸ちゃん)	February 23, 2001	June 20, 2002
When Pashmina must leave for a day, Howdy and Dexter volunteer to take care of Penelope, who is upset with losing Pashmina. While Howdy and Dexter are arguing, Penelope gets lost and the other Ham-Hams must find her before Pashmina, Howdy and Dexter discover she is gone. Meanwhile in the city, Laura and Kana meet a boy named Harold who lost his mother.
35	"Midnight Celebration"; Transliteration: "Tottoko Tanoshii! Hinamatsuri" (Japanese: とっとこ楽しい!ひなまつり)	March 2, 2001	June 21, 2002
Panda's owner Mimi is upset because her mother is going to have a baby instead of birthday party, so the Ham-Hams decide to have a midnight party to cheer Mimi up.
36	"Farewell Bijou!"; Transliteration: "Tottoko Sayonara! Ribon-chan" (Japanese: とっとこさよなら!リボンちゃん)	March 9, 2001	June 24, 2002
Maria must leave with her parents and Bijou to go back to France. Boss is sad. After Bijou's farewell party, she returns the next day because Maria's family decided not to go to France after all.
37	"Oxnard's Big Crush"; Transliteration: "Tottoko Genki Da! Jajahamu-chan" (Japanese: とっとこ元気だ!じゃじゃハムちゃん)	March 16, 2001	June 25, 2002
Laura and Kana's respective families visit Kana's cousin, Dylan, who is a farmer. Oxnard needs help from Hamtaro to confess his love for his old friend, Pepper.
38	"The Precious Letter!"; Transliteration: "Tottoko Todoke! Daiji Na Tegami" (Japanese: とっとことどけ!大事な手紙)	March 23, 2001	June 26, 2002
Laura's family decides to visit their old town, where Laura is excited to see her childhood friend, Melanie. After sending a letter to Melanie, there is no reply. Boss and Jingle decide to deliver the letter before Laura's family leaves.
39	"The Flying Ham-Hams!"; Transliteration: "Tottoko Sora Tobu! Hamuchanzu" (Japanese: とっとこ空飛ぶ!ハムちゃんず)	March 30, 2001	June 27, 2002
Panda finds a picture of a flying hamster in his attic, inspiring Hamtaro to learn how to fly. Meanwhile, Laura is looking for a subject to make a painting from flowers.
40	"The Blossom of Friendship!"; Transliteration: "Tottoko Saka Sou! Yuujou No Hana" (Japanese: とっとこ咲かそう!友情の花)	April 6, 2001	June 28, 2002
Laura and Kana's families decide to have a picnic near the cherry blossom tree. The Ham-Hams decide to have a picnic as well, but Bijou cannot go because Maria is sick. The Ham-Hams bring some blossoms to Bijou.
41	"The Scary Museum!"; Transliteration: "Tottoko Dokidoki! Hakubutsukan" (Japanese: とっとこドキドキ!博物館)	April 13, 2001	July 18, 2002
Laura's class is taking a trip to the museum to see a rock which looks just like a giant sunflower seed. The Ham-Hams think there are aliens and so they decide to go too.
42	"Welcome, Pepper!"; Transliteration: "Tottoko Youkoso! Jajahamu-chan" (Japanese: とっとこようこそ!じゃじゃハムちゃん)	April 20, 2001	July 19, 2002
Dylan and Pepper visit Kana. After Laura and Kana leave to show Dylan the entire city, the Ham-Hams bring Pepper to see the Ham-Ham Clubhouse and the amusement park.
43	"The Great Chicken Chase"; Transliteration: "Tottoko Magokoro! Daisakusen" (Japanese: とっとこまごころ!大作戦)	April 27, 2001	July 22, 2002
Oxnard accidentally lets the chickens out of the cage. After having trouble with the chickens, a female farmer named Charlotte Rooster saves the day.
44	"I Love My Grandpa!"; Transliteration: "Tottoko Daisuki! Ojiichan" (Japanese: とっとこ大好き!おじいちゃん)	May 4, 2001	July 23, 2002
After Laura's grandfather's invention puts Hamtaro in trouble, Laura runs away from home, so the Ham-Hams and Laura's grandfather go look for her.
45	"Ham-Ham Gang at the Aquarium!"; Transliteration: "Tottoko Odoroki! Suizokukan" (Japanese: とっとこおどろき!水族館)	May 11, 2001	August 19, 2002
Laura and Kana go to the aquarium with their fathers as well as Ham-Hams joining them.
46	"The Sports Festival!"; Transliteration: "Tottoko Faito da! Undoukai" (Japanese: とっとこファイトだ!運動会)	May 18, 2001	August 20, 2002
Laura's class is having a sports festival and must race with their parents. The Ham-Hams decide to do the sports festival too.
47	"Romancing the Roosters (a.k.a. The Romantic Setup)"; Transliteration: "Tottokoo Miai! Raburabu Daijiken" (Japanese: とっとこお見合い!らぶらぶ大事件)	May 25, 2001	August 21, 2002
Mr. Yoshi has a crush on Charlotte and decides to marry her.
48	"Ham-Ham Clubhouse in Danger!"; Transliteration: "Tottoko Dasshutsu! Chika Hausu" (Japanese: とっとこ脱出!地下ハウス)	June 1, 2001	August 22, 2002
After a mole creates a hole in the Ham-Ham Clubhouse on a very rainy day, the clubhouse is flooded with the Ham-Hams inside. The Ham-Hams must get back to the surface, and discover that Penelope and Brandy are their only hope to escape the flood. Meanwhile, Laura must do a project for school.
49	"In Search of the Pendant"; Transliteration: "Tottoko Sagase! Shiawase No Pendanto" (Japanese: とっとこさがせ!幸せのペンダント)	June 8, 2001	August 26, 2002
Laura's parents start to argue. Laura and her father buy a pendant to cheer her mother up. Two boys run into Laura and her father and they end up dropping the pendant. The Ham-Hams and Jingle must go to the mall and find the pendant in the night.
50	"Even the Ham-Hams get Seasick"; Transliteration: "Tottoko Yureruyo! Yuuransen" (Japanese: とっとこゆれるよ!遊覧船)	June 15, 2001	August 27, 2002
Laura's class, followed by the Ham-Hams and Auntie Viv, go on a cruise.
51	"Stan and Sandy Make Up"; Transliteration: "Tottoko Nakayoshi! Torahamu Kyoudai" (Japanese: とっとこなかよし!トラハム兄妹)	June 22, 2001	August 28, 2002
Sandy and Stan get into a big argument and storm off. The Ham-Hams learn it is their birthday and decide to throw them both a surprise birthday party. Meanwhile, Laura learns decorative food preparation in cooking class.
52	"It's Robin-Ham!"; Transliteration: "Tottoko Sanjou! Hamuhamu Kozou" (Japanese: とっとこ参上!ハムハム小僧)	June 29, 2001	August 29, 2002
The Ham-Hams and Laura have a dream about Howdy as an evil hamster named Howlin the Magician, who tries to take over the kingdom, but Hamtaro as Robin-Ham defeats him.

=== Season 3 ===
No.	Title	Original release date	English air date
53	"Pepper's Visit!"; Transliteration: "Tottoko Tanabata! Jajahamu-chan" (Japanese: とっとこ七夕!じゃじゃハムちゃん)	July 6, 2001	August 2, 2003
Country hamster Pepper comes for a visit in the city. Oxnard is all excitable over her visit, but things become complicated when Pepper ventures out into the city alone.
54	"Pop Star"; Transliteration: "Tottoko Aidoru! Kururin-chan" (Japanese: とっとこアイドル!くるりんちゃん)	July 13, 2001	April 13, 2003
A celebrity singer named Glitter transfers to Laura's school. She tries to steal Laura's crush Travis away from her. At the same time, Glitter's hamster Sparkle meets the Ham-Hams.
55	"Laura is Really Gone!"; Transliteration: "Tottoko Honto! Maigo No Roko-chan" (Japanese: とっとこホント!迷子のロコちゃん)	July 20, 2001	April 14, 2003
When Laura's parents find out that she failed to pass a test at school, they punish her by not buying a CD player she has been wanting. Out of anger, she runs away from home. Worried, the Ham-Hams try to find Laura in the city, where she ends up meeting Maria and accompanying her to a piano concert.
56	"Boss, the Cool Ham of the Sea!"; Transliteration: "Tottoko Moe Ro! Umi No Jaku Daisho" (Japanese: とっとこ燃えろ!海の若ダイショー)	July 27, 2001	April 15, 2003
Boss wants to head to the beach and go sailing with Bijou by allowing the other Ham-Hams to help him overcome his seasickness.
57	"Ghost Mountain!"; Transliteration: "Tottoko Kowai Zo! Touge No Obake" (Japanese: とっとこ怖いぞ!峠のおばけ)	August 3, 2001	April 16, 2003
Laura, Kana, Hamtaro, and Oxnard listen to a scary story from Mr. Yoshi's mother at her house about traveling couple named Harry and Ernie, who were lost on the mountains and never found.
58	"The Fresh Summer Breeze!"; Transliteration: "Tottoko Sawayaka! Natsu No Kaze" (Japanese: とっとこさわやか!夏の風)	August 10, 2001	April 17, 2003
When Bijou's owner Maria begins struggling with her piano lessons and recital, Hamtaro and his fellow hams decide to bring Maria out into the open fields to relax. At the same time, Laura decides to visit Maria out of concern.
59	"In A Pinch! A Rival Appears"; Transliteration: "Tottoko Pinchi Da! Raibaru Toujou" (Japanese: とっとこピンチだ!ライバル登場)	August 17, 2001	April 13, 2003
A shy boy named Roberto arrives in the neighborhood. To make things more interesting, he joins Travis' soccer team, but has difficulty working together with his teammates.
60	"The Chicken Contest"; Transliteration: "Tottoko Ganbare! Niwatori Taikai" (Japanese: とっとこがんばれ!にわとり大会)	August 24, 2001	April 18, 2003
Charlotte's father, Chairman Rooster, holds a contest on who can win the heart of his daughter by capturing one of his chickens and returning it to him in the utmost care. Mr. Yoshi accepts the challenge, but at the same time, another man is also going for the prize.
61	"Treasure Hunting"; Transliteration: "Tottoko Sagasou! Takaramono" (Japanese: とっとこさがそう!宝物)	August 31, 2001	April 13, 2003
While cleaning up Elder-Ham's house, the Ham-Hams find a treasure map! They spend all day searching and searching for the mysterious treasure but the map leads them in circles right back to Elder-Ham's house! Meanwhile, Laura's Mom has lost a precious brooch but can't find it anywhere. Are both the Ham-Ham's and Laura's Mom's mysterious treasures never to be found?
62	"Penelope Makes a Friend"; Transliteration: "Tottoko Hatsukoi! Chibimaru-chan" (Japanese: とっとこ初恋!ちび丸ちゃん)	September 7, 2001	April 21, 2003
Kylie, Penelope's owner has a cousin named Ethan who comes to visit the neighborhood. Ethan and Penelope take an immediate relationship to each other, playing all day until they both fall asleep exhausted and happy. Penelope soon decides that she wants to give Ethan something and show him that he is her new best friend, but due to her shy personality, the Ham-Hams try to help Penelope out of her disappointment and bring her to Ethan's school.
63	"The Scary Principal!"; Transliteration: "Tottoko Kowai! Kouchousensei" (Japanese: とっとここわ〜い!校長先生)	September 14, 2001	April 13, 2003
Laura inadvertently breaks a flowerpot containing a plant that the principal values greatly. She is terrified of what her scary principal might do to her. The Ham-Hams come to the rescue and try to fix the flowerpot before the principal notices, but he quickly returns as they finish fixing it. Everyone is in big trouble with Laura making a difficult apology.
64	"The Reconciliation!"; Transliteration: "Tottoko Hara-hara! Nakanaori" (Japanese: とっとこハラハラ!仲直り)	September 21, 2001	April 22, 2003
Both Howdy and Dexter's owners have a huge quarrel, so the Hams do whatever they can to end it.
65	"Mimi's Dream Park!"; Transliteration: "Tottoko Momo-chan! Yume No Yuuenchi" (Japanese: とっとこモモちゃん!夢の遊園地)	September 28, 2001	April 23, 2003
When Mimi, Panda's owner, cannot to go to the amusement park, the Ham-Hams decide to create an amusement park of their own to cheer her up. However, a powerful storm halts construction and it proves difficult for them to finish.
66	"The Sunflower Ferris Wheel"; Transliteration: "Tottoko Mawaruyo! Himawari Kanransha" (Japanese: とっとこまわるよ!ひまわり観覧車)	October 5, 2001	April 24, 2003
The Ham-Hams resume construction on their amusement park after last night's thunderstorm, but the storm had done some damage onto the unfinished park.
67	"The Zoo Date"; Transliteration: "Tottoko Deito da! Doubutsuen" (Japanese: とっとこデートだ!動物園)	October 12, 2001	April 25, 2003
Charlotte and Mr. Yoshi are going on a date to the zoo, where he has even prepared a special picnic lunch to share with Charlotte, Laura, and Kana. However, things get worse when Hector the ostrich not only escapes from his cage, but takes the picnic Mr. Yoshi carefully prepared.
68	"The Haunting"; Transliteration: "Tottoko Dokkiri! Kai Jiken" (Japanese: とっとこドッキリ!怪事件)	October 19, 2001	April 28, 2003
Laura, Kana, Mr. Haruna, and the Ham-Hams all drive out to visit Gabriel, Mr. Haruna's horror-story writer friend who lives in a big, fancy mansion. Once they arrived in Gabriel's house, Gabriel takes off on an impromptu errand and leaves everyone alone to keep watch over his big, creepy home.
69	"A Fortune Comes True!"; Transliteration: "Tottoko Uranai! Ooatari" (Japanese: とっとこ占い!大当たり)	October 26, 2001	April 29, 2003
Seeing that Kana likes to play with cards and tell people's fortunes, the Ham-Hams are immensely interested and want Oxnard to tell their fortunes. Boss thinks those are a bunch of hogwash but Oxnard predicts that Boss will meet up with something big, white, round rabbit sits right above him, which turns out to be someone's lost pet. The Ham-Hams, Laura and Kana all join in to help the rabbit find its owner.
70	"The Baby Goat"; Transliteration: "Tottoko Tanjou! Akachan Yagi" (Japanese: とっとこ誕生!赤ちゃんヤギ)	November 2, 2001	April 30, 2003
A goat is about to give birth at Pepper's farm, so Oxnard tries to prove himself to Pepper that he is helpful and caring.
71	"The Animal Hospital"; Transliteration: "Tottoko Hajimete! Doubutsubyouin" (Japanese: とっとこはじめて!動物病院)	November 9, 2001	May 1, 2003
When Bijou catches a cold, Maria, Laura, and Kana visit the local animal hospital for help.
72	"The Knitting Craze"; Transliteration: "Tottoko attaka! Mafura Daisakusen" (Japanese: とっとこあったか！マフラー大作戦)	November 16, 2001	May 2, 2003
When Laura and Kana begin practice knitting scarves, the Ham-Hams decide to create some of their own as well.
73	"A Breath of Autumn!"; Transliteration: "Tottoko Mitsuketa! Chiisai Aki" (Japanese: とっとこ見つけた！小さい秋)	November 23, 2001	May 5, 2003
On Labor Day, Laura and her mother want to give Mrs. Haruna a special break from all her household chores. Hamtaro observes as Laura's mother, having a moment to relax at last, looks out the window and remembers the last time she went out to enjoy the pretty autumn leaves. On his way out, Hamtaro runs into Bijou and the other Ham-Hams and together, they set off for the mountains to gather nuts and colorful leaves to bring back "Autumn" for Mrs. Haruna. But Hamtaro, reaching for the perfect maple leaf, slips and finds himself dangling treacherously over a steep cliff. Meanwhile, a storm is brewing and rain threatens to wash away our furry friends!
74	"Welcome Home Penelope!"; Transliteration: "Tottoko Okaeri! Chibimaru-chan" (Japanese: とっとこおかえり！ちび丸ちゃん)	November 30, 2001	May 6, 2003
Penelope is wandering around by herself, when all of a sudden she falls into a deep ditch! Luckily, Jingle and his faithful wanderer companion, Herbert the pig, happen to be in town. Herbert, by chance, finds little Penelope and rescues her from the perilous hole. From that moment on, Penelope is absolutely taken with Herbert. But Herbert and Jingle are in the midst of their travels, and the time to say goodbye comes all too soon. Penelope, crushed to see her new friend go, runs away and has her mind set to follow Herbert wherever he goes. How can the other Ham-Hams persuade Penelope to come back home?
75	"The Abominable Snow Woman"; Transliteration: "Tottoko Mita Nā! Yukionna" (Japanese: とっとこ見たなぁ〜！雪女)	December 7, 2001	May 7, 2003
While skating on the mountains, Laura and Kana bump into Mr. Yoshi, who invites them back to his mother's house. His mother, the talented ghost story teller who gave Laura and Kana shivers in summer with her story of hamster-hunting ghosts, has more tales to entertain them. This time, Laura, Kana, and the Ham-Hams tremble as Mr. Yoshi's mother, telling them about a mysterious snow woman who haunts the mountain. On the way home, Laura, Kana, the Ham-Hams, and Mr. Yoshi get separated in the woods.
76	"Hamtaro is a Star!"; Transliteration: "Tottoko Sutā da! Hamutaro" (Japanese: とっとこスターだ！ハム太郎)	December 14, 2001	May 8, 2003
In a film based on Snow White and the Seven Dwarfs, Laura and Hamtaro dream that they are a part of the story filling in for the roles of the classic fairy tale.
77	"A Wonderful Santa Claus!"; Transliteration: "Tottoko Sutekina! Santa Kurōsu" (Japanese: とっとこすてきな！サンタクロース)	December 21, 2001	May 9, 2003
Elder Ham has selected Hamtaro to be the next Santa Ham for Christmas, but when Bijou finds out, she tags along with Hamtaro to help him in delivering presents to other hamsters.
78	"The Little Bandits!"; Transliteration: "Tottoko Raburī! Kaitō Chīzu" (Japanese: とっとこラブリー！怪盗ちーず)	December 28, 2001	May 12, 2003
Bijou, Sandy, Pashmina, and Penelope notice that there are not many female thieves in any stories they have heard before, so the Ham-Hams come up with a story that involves a trio of female thieves known as "The Little Bandits". This episode reveals Boss, Maxwell, Dexter and Oxnard are ticklish.

=== Season 4 ===
No.	Title	Original release date	English air date
79	"The New Year's Kite Adventure"; Transliteration: "Tottoko Shinshun! Takoage Taikai" (Japanese: とっとこ新春！たこあげ大会)	January 4, 2002	May 13, 2003
On New Year's Day, most citizens in Laura's place have taken to kite flying. Panda teaches each of the other Ham-Hams how to make a kite. As the Ham-Hams fly them, Stan remarks about Hamtaro's kite flying closer to Bijou's, making Boss jealous. Howdy and Dexter fight to have their kites next to Pashmina's.
80	"Sunset Proposal"; Transliteration: "Tottoko Yuuhi Da! Puropo^zu" (Japanese: とっとこ夕日だ！プロポーズ)	January 11, 2002	May 14, 2003
A reluctant Mr. Yoshi is hesitant to propose marriage to Charlotte, so the Ham-Hams help him propose. However, Charlotte's father does not approve, so he sends out one of his prized roosters to stop them since Mr. Yoshi has a fear of chickens. His plan fails and Mr. Yoshi proposed to Charlotte, leaving the Ham-Hams cheering.
81	"Stucky's Tunnel"; Transliteration: "Tottoko Tonneru! Nukenai-kun" (Japanese: とっとこトンネル！ぬけないくん)	January 18, 2002	May 15, 2003
The Ham-Hams are in the forest playing hide-and-seek and as always, Cappy is the last one left hiding. However, with the other Ham-Hams' great bewilderment, there seem to be two Cappies calling "I'm ready!". Suddenly, a young little hamster that the Ham-Hams have never seen before comes out of the bush.
82	"Ham-Romance"; Transliteration: "Tottoko Tokimeki! Koi Uranai" (Japanese: とっとこときめき！恋占い)	January 25, 2002	May 16, 2003
Kana decides to tell Laura her romance fortune, which says that her pet will be her cupid. All nervous about his new role, Hamtaro makes a few goofs in his first set-up plan Laura ends up doing a face plant right in front of Travis.
83	"The Kindergarten Monsters!"; Transliteration: "Tottoko Mamemaki! Oni Taiji" (Japanese: とっとこ豆まき！鬼たいじ)	February 1, 2002	N/A
Mimi's school participates in the traditional Setsubun festival with Laura and Kana's fathers being the ogres.
84	"Laura's Valentine"; Transliteration: "Tottoko Dotabata! Barentain" (Japanese: とっとこドタバタ！バレンタイン)	February 8, 2002	May 19, 2003
On Valentine's Day, Laura has made chocolate for Travis and candy for her dad, both of which has a special little note inside. Laura is late for school, and on her way out the door, she accidentally gives the candy to her dad rather than the chocolate for Travis. Realizing that Laura made a mistake, Hamtaro decides to deliver the correct present for Travis.
85	"Roberto's Ally"; Transliteration: "Tottoko Don-chan! Daika Tsuyaku" (Japanese: とっとこどんちゃん！大活躍)	February 15, 2002	May 20, 2003
Roberto, Travis' soccer teammate, is really good at soccer but he will not cooperate with the rest of the team. Near the end of practice, he gets into an argument with his teammates and quits despite the fact that the regional championships are coming up soon. The Ham-Hams, who know that Travis' soccer team will not win without Roberto, decide to patch things up.
86	"Super Hamster Robo-Joe"; Transliteration: "Tottoko Robohamu! Meka Jirō" (Japanese: とっとこロボハム！メカじろう)	February 22, 2002	May 21, 2003
Laura's grandpa comes over with a new invention: Robo-Joe. Hamtaro introduces Robo-Joe to his fellow Ham-Hams, but all things go awry when the mechanical hamster begins to malfunction and runs loose into the city, getting into a lot of trouble.
87	"Maria's Birthday Party"; Transliteration: "Tottoko Panikku! Hinamatsuri" (Japanese: とっとこパニック！ひなまつり)	March 1, 2002	May 22, 2003
It's Maria's birthday and Laura has invited Kana, June, and Kylie along with her to celebrate. Meanwhile, the Ham-Hams secretly come along, but Boss seems very hesitant into entering the house (since he is wearing a fine suit to impress Bijou).
88	"Nin-Ham the Ninja!"; Transliteration: "Tottoko Ninja da! Ninhamu-kun" (Japanese: とっとこ忍者だ！ニンハムくん)	March 8, 2002	May 23, 2003
A hamster known as Nin-Ham appears out of nowhere. The Hams seem influenced and awe-inspired by this seemongly clever hamster that they decide to pass off as his students and follow his rigorous training methods. However, Nin-Ham is later exposed as a fraud, who actually failed in Ninja School and traveled in order to impress other hamsters. Meanwhile, Laura must confess to her parents that she lied about getting a good score on her math test.
89	"The Search for Spring!"; Transliteration: "Tottoko Sagasō! Haru to Haru" (Japanese: とっとこさがそう！春とはる)	March 15, 2002	May 27, 2003
As winter is ending, Laura's father has heard that flowers are starting to bloom around Shimmer Lake, so the family and Ham-Hams go on a weekend trip to hunt for spring. On their way, Laura's dad take a wrong turn with the whole gang ending up in a cold, gloomy place rather than at Shimmer Lake.
90	"Hamtaro and the Space Ship!"; Transliteration: "Tottoko Uchū e! Hamutaro" (Japanese: とっとこ宇宙だ！ハム太郎)	March 22, 2002	May 28, 2003
After watching a space film at the local Space Observatory, Hamtaro begins to wonder if he is really an alien and not destined to be with Laura.
91	"Boss Runs Away"; Transliteration: "Tottoko Taishō! Nagare Tabi" (Japanese: とっとこタイショー！ながれ旅)	March 29, 2002	May 29, 2003
Boss once again tries to tell Bijou his feelings for her but freezes up again. Sabu comes and visits the clubhouse and meets the Ham-hams for the first time. Boss looks up to Sabu and runs away with him to learn how to be a man for Bijou. Meanwhile Laura's mom is away. Even though Laura's dad doesn't know how to cook or clean. The Ham-hams worry about him especially Hamtaro. So he sets out to look for Boss with Sabu's girlfriend Francios. Once he saw him Hamtaro convinced him to go back to the clubhouse and Laura's mom came back home.
92	"Auntie Viv and Elder Ham"; Transliteration: "Tottoko o Hanami! O Hamu to Chourou" (Japanese: とっとこお花見!おハムと長老)	April 5, 2002	May 30, 2003
After Auntie Viv and Elder Ham have a fight, the Ham-Hams gather around to try to cheer them both up.
93	"Hannah is in Love!"; Transliteration: "Tottoko Hana-chan! Koi no Hana Hana" (Japanese: とっとこはなちゃん!恋のはなはな)	April 12, 2002	June 2, 2003
Howdy's childhood friend, Hannah, comes to visit him and develops a small crush on Dexter. Confiding in Howdy, Hannah asks him to find out how Dexter feels about her.
94	"Doctor Lion"; Transliteration: "Tottoko Yasashii! Raion Sensei" (Japanese: とっとこやさしい!ライオン先生)	April 19, 2002	June 3, 2003
Laura decides to take her dog Brandy for a check-up at Dr. Lion's vehicle clinic, but Brandy is anything but excited to head there. Hamtaro becomes curious of what Dr. Lion is really like, so he and the Ham-Hams decide to investigate. Knowing Dr. Lion has a ton of work, the Ham-Hams help him out.
95	"Dance, Chef Ham!"; Transliteration: "Tottoko Odoru Yo! Kokku San" (Japanese: とっとこ踊るよ!コックさん)	April 26, 2002	June 4, 2003
A hamster known as Chef Ham visits the Ham-Ham Clubhouse with several cooking methods up his sleeves. Oxnard becomes impressed by him that he would eat anything Chef Ham can prepare.
96	"The Flying Carp"; Transliteration: "Tottoko Tobu Noda! Koinobori" (Japanese: とっとこ飛ぶのだ!こいのぼり)	May 3, 2002	June 5, 2003
Walking around her neighborhood, Laura sees that many houses have wind-socks in the form of flying carp that flow gracefully from their rafters. She runs home and asks her mom if she can put one up at their house too, but her mom does not allow her. The next day, Grandpa Woody comes over and tells Laura that when he was younger, he dreamed of riding on the back of a flying fish, soaring through the sky. With all of them being excited, Laura embarks with Grandpa Woody on an invention escapade to create a mechanical flying carp. However, their attempts do not go too smoothly.
97	"The Ham-Ham Express"; Transliteration: "Tottoko Shuppatsu! Hamuchanzu Gou" (Japanese: とっとこ出発!ハムちゃんず号)	May 10, 2002	June 6, 2003
While Laura, Kana and their classmates go on a class field trip to the mountains with Mr. Yoshi, the Ham-Hams decide to create their own expressway system underground that would lead to the mountains.
98	"Who Stole My Shoe?"; Transliteration: "Tottoko Sagasu Zo! Kie Ta Kutsu" (Japanese: とっとこ捜すぞ!消えたクツ)	May 17, 2002	June 9, 2003
At Laura's school, something strange is happening. Everyone's shoes are disappearing! So Hamtaro becomes a private investiham, and with his magnifying glass, goes on a hunt for the culprit. But Hamtaro and the Ham-Hams run into trouble when an escaped monkey begins to chase after them!
99	"Keeping Promises"; Transliteration: "Tottoko Mamoru Yo! Daiji Na Yakusoku" (Japanese: とっとこ守るよ!大事な約束)	May 24, 2002	June 10, 2003
Laura and Kana have a huge fight, so Hamtaro and Oxnard try to end their quarrel. At the same time, Boss accuses Hamtaro of forgetting about helping Bijou and that she got hurt (when she really didn't) in the process.
100	"The Very Best Present"; Transliteration: "Tottoko Momo-chan! Sutekina Okurimono" (Japanese: とっとこモモちゃん!すてきな贈り物)	May 31, 2002	June 11, 2003
Mimi's father's birthday is coming up very soon, but Mimi has no idea what to give him as a present. She really wants to do something special for him, so when she sees one day how emotional he gets when he hears Maria playing the piano, Mimi decides that she is going to learn to play something for him.
101	"How to Rescue a Wedding!"; Transliteration: "Tottoko Happi! Uedeingu" (Japanese: とっとこハッピー!ウェディング)	June 7, 2002	June 12, 2003
Mr. Yoshi and Charlotte's wedding day has finally arrived, but Charlotte is nowhere to be seen. She sends Mr. Yoshi a letter at the church stating that she can't be at the wedding without her father being there for her. The Ham-Hams subtly get involved and do what they can to help the wedding become realized.
102	"Office Adventures"; Transliteration: "Tottoko Kaisha Da! Dai Hashagi" (Japanese: とっとこ会社だ!大はしゃぎ)	June 14, 2002	June 13, 2003
Laura is preparing a very special celebration for Father's Day! But her dad has been so busy at work these days, and he might not make it home in time to for the Father's Day party. That's no good! So Hamtaro and the Ham-Hams decide to make a visit to Forrest Haruna's office and give him a hand. Maybe they can help him work faster! Pretty soon the Ham-Hams even know how to use a photocopying machine.
103	"Clubhouse Intruders (aka: The Ham-Hams Rescue Stan)"; Transliteration: "Tottoko Yokodori! Chika Hausu" (Japanese: とっとこよこどり!地下ハウス)	June 21, 2002	June 23, 2003
After Laura tells Hamtaro about an earthquake and a fire drill, the Ham-Hams decide to practice for one. But meanwhile, Stan declines to go outside and while he stays in, the Chickies break into the clubhouse. And Stan is trapped in the clubhouse. So the Ham-Hams decide to help him out.
104	"The Tale of Princess Bijou"; Transliteration: "Tottoko Goyou Da! Himawarino Hamutaro" (Japanese: とっとこ御用だ!ひまわりのハム太郎)	June 28, 2002	June 24, 2003
One sleepy rainy evening, Laura and Hamtaro fall asleep while reading a book full of fairytales...and dream of a land full of castles and princesses. Bijou is a tough-girl princess who, tired of being cooped up in her castle all day, disappears disguised into the streets of her fiefdom. But she runs into troubles when an evil Sparkle orders her ninja team to get rid of Princess Bijou.
105	"The Milky Way"; Transliteration: "Tottoko o Negai! Ten No Kawa" (Japanese: とっとこお願い!天の川)	July 5, 2002	June 25, 2003
Laura and her class are studying the star constellations at school, and have a field trip planned to study the Milky Way under the real night sky! So Laura and Kana are all excited because they will have plenty of stars to wish on. Kana says jokingly to Laura that if you wish on a star at the same time as someone else, the two of them will fall in love! Laura, half believing, sets her mind on standing by Travis when her class goes to see the stars so that they can make a wish on a star together. However, Hamtaro thinks that she'll be leaving on a star to make her wish. He and the Ham-Hams decide to stop Laura from making her wish. In the end, Laura forgets all about her wish, when she starts having fun focusing on the fireflies.

=== Season 5 ===
No.	Title	Original release date
106	"Stucky Falls In Love!"; Transliteration: "Tottoko Koisuru! Nukenai-kun" (Japanese: とっとこ恋する! ぬけないくん)	July 12, 2002
Stucky returns to play hide-and-seek with the Ham-Hams, and he falls in love with a bunny in a stump. Cappy wants to ask the bunny to play hide-and-seek with Stucky. Meanwhile, Laura and her mom help Laura's cousin Erika prepare for her wedding.
107	"The Rolling Giant Egg"; Transliteration: "Tottoko Korogaru! Ooki Na Tamago" (Japanese: とっとこ転がる! 大きなタマゴ)	July 19, 2002
An ostrich's egg rolls away from Mr. Yoshi and Charlotte's farm, and the Ham-Hams try to take care of it, but the Chicky-Chickies hassle them.
108	"The Seaside Rest House"; Transliteration: "Tottoko Natsu Da! Umi no Ie" (Japanese: とっとこ夏だ! 海の家)	July 26, 2002
Laura, her parents and classmates, and Mr. Yoshi go to the beach, and the Ham-Hams go too.
109	"Go For It, Super Hamster Robo-Joe"; Transliteration: "Tottoko Ganbaru! Meka Jirou" (Japanese: とっとこがんばる! メカじろう)	August 2, 2002
Laura and Kana visit Laura's grandparents, and the Ham-Hams see Robo-Joe again.
110	"Stepping Ham-Hams"; Transliteration: "Tottoko Odoro u! Hamuchanzu" (Japanese: とっとこ踊ろう! ハムちゃんず)	August 9, 2002
Laura, Kana, their parents, and Kana's cousin Dylan go to an Ondoda festival, and the Ham-Hams, Sabu, and Pepper have a Ham-Ham festival too, and Oxnard learns how to play the Ondoda drums.
111	"Spooky Night at School!"; Transliteration: "Tottoko Zozozo^tsu! Kimodameshi" (Japanese: とっとこゾゾゾーッ! きもだめし)	August 16, 2002
Laura's school has a bravery test, and the Ham-Hams go too.
112	"The Tightrope of Love!"; Transliteration: "Tottoko Ai no! Tsunawatari" (Japanese: とっとこ愛の! つなわたり)	August 23, 2002
The Ham-Hams make their own circus.
113	"Sparkle's Vacation"; Transliteration: "Tottoko Bakansu! Kururin-chan" (Japanese: とっとこバカンス! くるりんちゃん)	August 30, 2002
Glitter returns to Japan for her job, and so does Sparkle. The Ham-Hams want to play with Sparkle, but she wants to have a more lovely and elegant vacation...
114	"Hamtaro, the Knight"; Transliteration: "Tottoko Naito Da! Hamutaro" (Japanese: とっとこナイトだ! ハム太郎)	September 6, 2002
After Boss saves Bijou from a big ball that was headed toward her, everyone says that Boss is like a knight. Later, there is a typhoon and Laura's parents can't make it home, so Hamtaro decides to be like a knight and protect Laura from the storm.
115	"Fly Away! Super Hamster Robo-Joe"; Transliteration: "Tottoko Tonderu! Meka Jirou" (Japanese: とっとことんでる! メカじろう)	September 13, 2002
Robo-Joe takes the Ham-Hams flying in a plane-like transformation. But something goes wrong...
116	"Return of the Rooster Trio"; Transliteration: "Tottoko Futabi! Niwatori Torio" (Japanese: とっとこふたたび! にわとりトリオ)	September 20, 2002
The chickens escape from Mr. Yoshi and Charlotte's farm, and they have to get them back. The Ham-Hams decide to help too.
117	"Dreamwatcher! Penelope"; Transliteration: "Tottoko Yume Miru! Chibimaru-chan" (Japanese: とっとこ夢みる! ちび丸ちゃん)	September 27, 2002
Penelope dreams to see a castle.
118	"This is the Ham-Ham Castle!"; Transliteration: "Bokura no! Hamuhamu Kyassuru" (Japanese: とっとこぼくらの! ハムハムキャッスル)	October 4, 2002
After what happened yesterday, Pashmina got sick, and June messed up Kylie's cake. Can the Ham-Hams help Penelope's castle dream come true, or will the friendship between June and Kylie as well as Pashmina and Penelope fall apart?
119	"Oxnard's Pure Heart"; Transliteration: "Tottoko Todoke! Koushi no Junjou" (Japanese: とっとことどけ! こうしの純情)	October 11, 2002
Oxnard wants to see Pepper. Can he show the power of love?
120	"Where Are You, Cappy!"; Transliteration: "Tottoko Doko Nano! Kaburu-kun" (Japanese: とっとこどこなの! かぶるくん)	October 18, 2002
When the Ham-Hams decide what to play, Cappy wants to play hide and seek, but he speaks so quietly, no one can hear him, and they go with Panda's idea of playing dodgeball instead. While Boss is looking for the ball, Cappy asks about Boss's tunnel. Boss says that it continues forever, and no matter how far you walk, you'll have to walk even farther. Cappy is sad until Stucky shows up. They both decide to play hide and seek in the tunnel. They have a lot of fun, until an earthquake traps them!
121	"Boss's Showdown"; Transliteration: "Tottoko Shoubu Da! Taisho-kun" (Japanese: とっとこ勝負だ! タイショーくん)	October 25, 2002
A stray cat threatens Bijou, and Hamtaro and Boss try to protect her, but Boss is afraid and cowers. However, Hamtaro and Bijou think Boss was brave and that he "lowered his head to feint the cat". Boss is upset that he was such a coward, and he runs out of the clubhouse. Hamtaro goes to find him, but Boss yells at Hamtaro, saying he wants to be left alone. Hamtaro says he wouldn't want to come near Boss. Sabu comes, and says that they shouldn't fight, but instead they should have a duel.
122	"Watch out for a Wolf"; Transliteration: "Tottoko Honto! Ookami Ga Deta Zo" (Japanese: とっとこほんと! オオカミが出たぞ)	November 1, 2002
Laura and Kana are in the school's play of Little Red Riding Hood. Meanwhile, a scary wolf stalks the Ham-Hams, but is it really a wolf?
123	"Doomed Ham-Ham Clubhouse"; Transliteration: "Tottoko Dou Naru! Chika Hausu" (Japanese: とっとこどうなる! 地下ハウス)	November 8, 2002
Humans are going to dig up the tree above the Ham-Ham Clubhouse! Can the Ham-Hams save their precious club?
124	"Mother's Home-Style Cooking"; Transliteration: "Tottoko Aki Dayo! Ofukuro no Aji" (Japanese: とっとこ秋だよ! おふくろの味)	November 15, 2002
Zack has an argument with his mom, so the Ham-Hams go on a trip to Trotting Mountain to find a gift for him.
125	"Trouble-making Nin-Ham"; Transliteration: "Tottoko Komatta! Ninhamu-kun" (Japanese: とっとここまった! ニンハムくん)	November 22, 2002
Nin-Ham falls out of the sky and tells the Ham-Hams he has a special mission so they won't think he's clumsy. The Ham-Hams try to help him.
126	"Sweet Little Flora"; Transliteration: "Tottoko Yasashii! Na^su-chan" (Japanese: とっとこやさしい! ナースちゃん)	November 29, 2002
The Ham-Hams meet Flora the nurse hamster, an assistant to Dr. Lion, and Stan starts to fall for her.
127	"Brandy the Rescue Squad"; Transliteration: "Tottoko Don-chan! Resukyu^Tai" (Japanese: とっとこどんちゃん! レスキュー隊)	December 6, 2002
Laura and Kana get into problems while skiing, and Brandy and the Ham-Hams help. Also, Boss and Stan compete to see who is better at skiing.
128	"Sparkle in Love"; Transliteration: "Tottoko Koi Nano! Kururin-chan" (Japanese: とっとこ恋なの! くるりんちゃん)	December 13, 2002
Sparkle meets Omar, and she starts to like him mostly because Howdy says Omar lives like a prince. Sparkle misses the part about the "lives like" and thought he was actually a prince. She noticed that Omar was different from the Ham-Hams, because he is more charming. The Ham-Hams tell her that he travels around the world. But Sparkle actually wants to become a princess and travel. She daydreams about their marriage. However Sparkle doesn't like Omar at the end of the episode, because when they actually traveled together (Sparkle stopped being a star just to be with Omar and become a princess), their adventure consisted of going to hot and cold places, and snake and shark infested places. Sparkle decides to stick to being a star. At the end of the episode it's revealed Omar didn't even have feelings for Sparkle.
129	"Mimi's Christmas"; Transliteration: "Tottoko Momo-chan! Kurisumasu" (Japanese: とっとこモモちゃん! クリスマス)	December 20, 2002
Mimi wishes to have the greatest Christmas ever, but her dad and Kana's dad get into an argument and don't want each other's families to spend Christmas together. So the Ham-Hams try to help give Mimi a Christmas party.
130	"Harmony's Love Magic"; Transliteration: "Tottoko Rin Rin! Enjieru-chan" (Japanese: とっとこりんりん! エンジェルちゃん)	December 27, 2002
The Ham-Hams dream and meet Harmony and Spat. Will Hamtaro, Bijou, and Harmony stop Spat?

=== Season 6 ===
No.	Title	Original release date
131	"Ham-Hams' Joyful Day"; Transliteration: "Tottoko Medetai! Hamuchanzu" (Japanese: とっとこめでたい! ハムちゃんず)	January 10, 2003
It's New Year's, and Penelope and one of the chickens become friends. Will the Ham-Hams and chickens work together to save Penelope and the baby chicken?
132	"Maria's Memorable Book"; Transliteration: "Tottoko Ribon to! Omoide no Ehon" (Japanese: とっとこリボンと! 思い出の絵本)	January 17, 2003
Maria writes a letter to her grandmother, and Hamtaro and Bijou help Maria to get her letter to her grandmother.
133	"Knitting Barrette"; Transliteration: "Tottoko Amiami! Poniteru-chan" (Japanese: とっとこあみあみ! ポニーテールちゃん)	January 24, 2003
The Ham-Hams meet Barrette, a hamster who can knit. Barrette has a crush on Hamtaro and she sees Bijou as a rival. Meanwhile, Penelope is sad that Pashmina is not with the Ham-Hams. Will Barrette be friends with Penelope?
134	"Smile, Hillary!"; Transliteration: "Tottoko Waratsu! Hikari-san" (Japanese: とっとこ笑って! ヒカリさん)	January 31, 2003
Sandy's owner Hillary messes up gym training and Sandy gets worried. Can the Ham-Hams help Hillary master gym again?
135	"Hamtaro Gets Cold"; Transliteration: "Tottoko Kaze no! Hamutaro" (Japanese: とっとこかぜの! ハム太郎)	February 7, 2003
Hamtaro wants to go outside with Laura, but she leaves him behind because she thought he might be getting a cold. But Hamtaro hears her say that he was acting weird, which hurts his feelings, and he leaves on a journey with Jingle to find "the cloak of the wind".
136	"Come on, Stan!"; Transliteration: "Tottoko Ikeike! Torahamu-kun" (Japanese: とっとこイケイケ! トラハムくん)	February 14, 2003
It's Valentine's Day, and the Ham-Ham girls plan on what to give the Ham-Ham boys. Sandy wants to give her sweetheart Maxwell something, Boss thinks Bijou will give something to Hamtaro, and Stan wants to impress Flora. Will the Ham-Girls and Ham-Boys get what they desire?
137	"Vanished Hamtaro"; Transliteration: "Tottoko Kie Ta! Hamutaro" (Japanese: とっとこ消えた! ハム太郎)	February 21, 2003
The Ham-Hams think Hamtaro has gotten stuck in a painting and try to get him out.
138	"Pepper in Girl's Day"; Transliteration: "Tottoko Jajahamu! Ohinasama" (Japanese: とっとこじゃじゃハム! おひなさま)	February 28, 2003
The Ham-Hams visit Pepper, and Oxnard and Pepper are emperor and empress in the Doll Festival.
139	"Yume, the Story-teller"; Transliteration: "Tottoko Yume-chan! O Hanashi Kikasete" (Japanese: とっとこユメちゃん! おはなしきかせて)	March 7, 2003
Maxwell's owner Melissa is upset that Zack laughed at her. Maxwell and Howdy start to fight. Can they forgive each other so Maxwell and Howdy can become friends again?
140	"Thrilled Ook-Ook"; Transliteration: "Tottoko Ukiuki ! Ukihamu-kun" (Japanese: とっとこウキウキ! ウキハムくん)	March 14, 2003
The Ham-Hams meet Ook-Ook, a hamster dressed like a monkey, and Buster, a security guard hamster who is pursuing Ook-Ook.
141	"I Love You, Hamtaro"; Transliteration: "Tottoko Suki Nano! Hamutaro" (Japanese: とっとこ好きなの! ハム太郎)	March 21, 2003
Sparkle becomes jealous of Bijou because she believes Bijou is prettier than her (She starts believing this when Bijou was able to get Hamtaro's attention but she couldn't). She begins to like Hamtaro and tries to capture his heart to make Bijou jealous.
142	"Make a Wish to Cherry Blossom!"; Transliteration: "Tottoko Onegai! Hanafubuki" (Japanese: とっとこおねがい! 花吹雪)	March 28, 2003
Panda's owner Mimi wants to see cherry blossoms.
143	"Triplets! Hambini"; Transliteration: "Tottoko Mittsu Ko no! Chibichanzu" (Japanese: とっとこ三つ子の! ちびちゃんず)	April 4, 2003
The Ham-Hams meet mischievous triplet hamsters called the Hambini Brothers.
144	"Duel at the Flower Ranch"; Transliteration: "Tottoko Kettou! Furawa^ Bokujou" (Japanese: とっとこ決闘! フラワー牧場)	April 11, 2003
The Ham-Hams and their owners visit Dylan's farm, along with Travis and Roberto.
145	"Boss's New Rest House"; Transliteration: "Tottoko Taisho^! Ikoi no Heya" (Japanese: とっとこタイショー! いこいの部屋)	April 18, 2003
The Ham-Hams make too much noise while playing, and they upset Boss, who is trying to sleep. So the Ham-Hams want to make a new room for Boss to play and relax in.
146	"Two's Memory"; Transliteration: "Tottoko Futari no! Daiji Na Omoide" (Japanese: とっとこふたりの! 大事な思い出)	April 25, 2003
Laura and Hamtaro visit their old hometown, and see Laura's old friend Claire.
147	"Count on Us! Nurse Troop"; Transliteration: "Tottoko Omakase! Hamuhamu Na^su Tai" (Japanese: とっとこおまかせ! ハムハムナース隊)	May 2, 2003
Bijou, Pashmina, Sandy, Penelope, and Boss want to help Flora. This made Stan, Howdy, Dexter, and Maxwell fall over; Bijou, Pashmina, Sandy, Hamtaro, and Oxnard dress as nurses.
148	"It's Mother's Day, Auntie Viv"; Transliteration: "Tottoko Arere! O Hamu Kaasan" (Japanese: とっとこあれれ! おハムかあさん)	May 9, 2003
The Ham-Hams think that Auntie Viv is a mother figure, so they pamper her for Mother's Day.
149	"Sparkle in Scandal"; Transliteration: "Tottoko Sukyandaru Nano! Kururin-chan" (Japanese: とっとこスキャンダルなの! くるりんちゃん)	May 16, 2003
Sparkle thinks that cameramen got an exclusive of her having a romance with Hamtaro, but they were really just old men and women taking pictures of plants. But Sparkle is convinced there will be a scandal and she moves into Boss's room in the Clubhouse. Will she ever go back to Glitter?
150	"Fight on, Super Hamster Robo-Joe!"; Transliteration: "Tottoko Tatakae! Meka Jirou" (Japanese: とっとこたたかえ! メカじろう)	May 23, 2003
Robo-Joe is entered in a competition against another robot. Can he win?
151	"Snoozer and Turtly"; Transliteration: "Tottoko Neteru to! Kamezou-kun" (Japanese: とっとこねてると! カメゾウくん)	May 30, 2003
Omar visits and takes a rest, and meanwhile, Snoozer rides around on Omar's turtle.
152	"Finding the Flower in the Rain"; Transliteration: "Tottoko Amefuri! Ajisai no Hana" (Japanese: とっとこ雨ふり! アジサイの花)	June 6, 2003
The Ham-Hams search for a hydrangea on a rainy day.
153	"Taking Care of Our Greeny"; Transliteration: "Tottoko Sodate! Bokura no Midorin" (Japanese: とっとこ育て! ぼくらのミドリン)	June 13, 2003
The Ham-Hams take care of a caterpillar they saved from the Chicky-Chickies.
154	"A Trip of Hunger"; Transliteration: "Tottoko Techitechi! Harapeko no Tabi" (Japanese: とっとこてちてち! ハラペコの旅)	June 20, 2003
Laura and Kana run away with Hamtaro and Oxnard. Boss, Howdy, Dexter, and Bijou look for them. Bijou is afraid that Hamtaro has gone forever.
155	"Young Girl Thieves of Justice!"; Transliteration: "Tottoko Seigi no! Onna Nezumi Kozou" (Japanese: とっとこ正義の! 女ねずみ小僧)	June 27, 2003
Hamtaro dreams that Bijou, Pashmina, Penelope, and Sandy are normal singers and dancers by day, but at night they are Girl Thieves.

=== Season 7 ===
No.	Title	Original release date	English air date
156	"A Little Love Story"; Transliteration: "Tottoko Chiisa Na! Koi no Monogatari" (Japanese: とっとこ小さな! 恋の物語)	July 4, 2003	N/A
When Maxwell reads a love story his owner Yume wrote, Sandy asks Maxwell if he likes someone. This causes Maxwell to blush from embarrassment (because he likes her). He replies "Why would I like a girl?" and Sandy leaves the room feeling sad. Sandy talks about it with Bijou and Pashmina, and they tell her to never give up and to never change her feelings about him. Later, at nighttime, the Ham-Hams leave Sandy and Maxwell alone under the stars. Will Maxwell be able to tell Sandy that he loves her just as much as she loves him?
157	"Danger! Chicken Trio!"; Transliteration: "Tottoko Denja^! Niwatori Torio" (Japanese: とっとこデンジャー! ニワトリトリオ)	July 11, 2003	N/A
Laura has to clean the chickens' cage, but they chase after the Ham-Hams. Can they beat the chickens?
158	"Sparkle is a Star!"; Transliteration: "Tottoko Kururin! Suta Nano!" (Japanese: とっとこくるりん! スターなの)	July 18, 2003	N/A
The Ham-Hams help Sparkle with acting lessons.
159	"Warm Potatoes of Love"; Transliteration: "Tottoko Koi no! Atsuatsu Poteto" (Japanese: とっとこ恋の! あつあつポテト)	July 25, 2003	N/A
The Ham-Hams meet Tater, a hamster who runs a food truck, and after he saves a high-class hamster named Malta, he wants to give her a present to show his love for her.
160	"Lost at the Amusement Park"; Transliteration: "Tottoko Maigo Da! Yuuenchi" (Japanese: とっとこまいごだ! 遊園地)	August 1, 2003	N/A
The Ham-Hams help little twin girls named Eri and Yuri who get lost from their parents in an amusement park.
161	"Let's Swim, Seamore!"; Transliteration: "Tottoko Oyogu Zo! Kamehamu-kun" (Japanese: とっとこ泳ぐぞ! カメハムくん)	August 8, 2003	N/A
The Ham-Hams meet Seamore, a hamster who can swim.
162	"Summer, Ghost Stories!"; Transliteration: "Tottoko Natsu Dayo ! Kimodameshi" (Japanese: とっとこ夏だよ! きもだめし)	August 15, 2003	N/A
Laura and Kana hear ghost stories at summer camp.
163	"Summer Color, Solara!"; Transliteration: "Tottoko Natsu Iro! Himawari-chan" (Japanese: とっとこ夏色! ひまわりちゃん)	August 22, 2003	N/A
When Laura and her parents visit their friends at a sunflower field, the Ham-Hams meet Solara.
164	"Nin-Ham and the Iga-Iga Village"; Transliteration: "Tottoko Ninhamu! Igaiga no Sato" (Japanese: とっとこニンハム! イガイガの里)	August 29, 2003	N/A
Hamtaro, Oxnard, Bijou and Boss help Nin-Ham with his summer assignment when Laura and Kana visit a ninja-themed amusement park.
165	"Tomy-T and Eggy-P"; Transliteration: "Tottoko Tomato-kun to! Nassu-kun" (Japanese: とっとこトマトくんと! ナッスーくん)	September 5, 2003	N/A
Laura is cultivating veggies, and the Ham-Hams think it would be fun to cultivate their own food too. But Oxnard is missing, and the Ham-Hams search for him in the tunnels. When they come out of the ground, an owl grabs them! They are taken to a place in the woods where they find Oxnard, and they meet gardeners named Eggy-P and Tomy-T. They then help them with their garden and defend it from crows.
166	"Pi-hyoro, Ham-Hams!"; Transliteration: "Pi^hyoro! Hamuchanzu" (Japanese: とっとこピーヒョロ! ハムちゃんず)	September 12, 2003	N/A
The Ham-Hams help an old man with his paintings of a bird of prey named Tobisuke.
167	"The Baby's Big Adventure"; Transliteration: "Tottoko Akachan! Daibouken" (Japanese: とっとこ赤ちゃん! 大冒険)	September 19, 2003	N/A
Laura and Kana go to see Mr. Yoshi and Charlotte's new baby, Yamato, and the Ham-Hams go too. While Charlotte, her father, Chairman Rooster, and Laura and Kana go to get Yamato's new kimono, Chairman Rooster leaves Big the hen and the Chicky-Chickies to help Mr. Yoshi take care of Yamato. But the Ham-Hams don't like this and neither does Mr. Yoshi, so Mr. Yoshi traps the chickens outside, but then he falls asleep! Then it's up to the Ham-Hams to keep Yamato out of trouble.
168	"I Want To See You, Bijou!"; Transliteration: "Tottoko Ai Tai! Ribon-chan" (Japanese: とっとこ会いたい! リボンちゃん)	September 26, 2003	N/A
One day, Bijou falls from the tree at her house and lies on the grass, unable to get up. Maria spots her and takes her inside, and Bijou realizes how much she had made her owner worry. She promises to never leave her home again, meaning she cannot see her friends ever again. Even so, Hamtaro decides to see her every day to cheer her up.
169	"You're Arrested, Robo-Joe!"; Transliteration: "Tottoko Meka Jirou! Taiho Nano" (Japanese: とっとこメカじろう! 逮捕なの〜)	October 3, 2003	N/A
The Ham-Hams see Sparkle and Robo-Joe again.
170	"Mimi's Fun Sports Day"; Transliteration: "Tottoko Momo-chan! Undoukai" (Japanese: とっとこモモちゃん! 運動会)	October 10, 2003	N/A
Mimi's school is having a sports day, and the Ham-Hams help her.
171	"Seamore and the Dolphin"; Transliteration: "Tottoko Iruka to! Kamehamu-kun" (Japanese: とっとこイルカと! カメハムくん)	October 17, 2003	N/A
The Ham-Hams and Seamore help a dolphin return to the sea.
172	"Marron's Autumn Festival"; Transliteration: "Tottoko Chibikuri! Aki Matsuri" (Japanese: とっとこちびくり! 秋まつり)	October 24, 2003	N/A
The Ham-Hams meet Marron, a friend of Tomy-T and Eggy-P, and she tells them that the vegetable orchard will be in trouble because of a coming typhoon. So, the Ham-Hams help Tomy-T, Eggy-P, and Marron save the vegetables.
173	"Ham-Ham Halloween"; Transliteration: "Tottoko Harouin! Dai Henshin" (Japanese: とっとこハロウィン!大へんしん)	October 31, 2003	October 15, 2003
The Ham-Hams decide to have a costume party for Halloween. They go into the forest by the park for the party when they are ambushed by the Halloween Phantom and Wolf-Ham, who turns out to be Auntie Viv and Elder Ham. Note: This is the last episode to be aired on Cartoon Network. Also the last episode to air on YTV, airing in Canada on October 31, 2006. Also the only episode after 104 to be aired in English.
174	"An Epic Adventure! Ham-Ham Explorers"; Transliteration: "Tottoko Roman Da ! Hamuhamu Tankentai" (Japanese: とっとこロマンだ! ハムハム探検隊)	November 7, 2003	N/A
The Ham-Hams explore in a cave, but Sandy goes missing! Can Maxwell and the Ham-Hams find her, or is the story about Chris and his love Rose going to end?
175	"Where Did You Go, Brandy?"; Transliteration: "Tottoko Don-chan! Doko Iku no" (Japanese: とっとこどんちゃん! どこ行くの)	November 14, 2003	N/A
Brandy runs away from home because Laura and her parents got a poodle to watch over.
176	"Pipo, Ham-Ham Nurse Team!"; Transliteration: "Tottoko Pi^po^! Hamuhamu Na^su Tai" (Japanese: とっとこピーポー! ハムハムナース隊)	November 21, 2003	N/A
The Ham-Girls and Boss help Flora with a Ham-Ham Ambulance.
177	"Shiny, Shooting Star!"; Transliteration: "Tottoko Pikapika ! Nagareboshi" (Japanese: とっとこぴかぴか! 流れ星)	November 28, 2003	N/A
Penelope and Marron want to make a wish on a shooting star.
178	"Where Is He? Dad's Great Chase!"; Transliteration: "Tottoko Doko He! Papa Dai Tsuiseki" (Japanese: とっとこどこへ! パパ大追跡)	December 5, 2003	N/A
The Ham-Hams investigate what Laura's dad is doing when he leaves the house at night mysteriously.
179	"Run, Pepper!"; Transliteration: "Tottoko Hashire! Jajahamu-chan" (Japanese: とっとこ走れ! じゃじゃハムちゃん)	December 12, 2003	N/A
Dylan and Pepper are going to visit Kana and her parents, but their car broke down. Will Oxnard be able to see Pepper?
180	"The Mysterious Gift"; Transliteration: "Tottoko Fushigi Na! Okurimono" (Japanese: とっとこ不思議な! おくりもの)	December 19, 2003	N/A
Kana gets a "TV-PC" toy for Christmas, and she and Laura play with it. Hamtaro, Oxnard, Bijou, and Boss are curious and play with it too, but Boss knocks it over accidentally and one of the batteries gets knocked out, and Kana thinks it has broken. It's up to the Ham-Hams to fix it!
181	"Bo and the Mammoth"; Transliteration: "Tottoko Manmosu!? Nijihamu-kun" (Japanese: とっとこマンモス! ?にじハムくん)	December 26, 2003	N/A
Hamtaro dreams that he and his friends are cave-hams, and they meet a flying hamster called Bo who has lost his magical umbrella, and, without it, he can't make a rainbow or get back home. They go to the village guru (Elder-Ham) to find out where the umbrella is. They end up looking for it on a mammoth, but Bo and Hamtaro are sucked into its trunk! Can the Ham-Hams save them?

=== Season 8 ===
No.	Title	Original release date
182	"Happy Ook-Ook!"; Transliteration: "Tottoko Happi^! Ukihamu-kun" (Japanese: とっとこハッピー! ウキハムくん)	January 9, 2004
The Ham-Hams visit Ook-Ook and Buster at the zoo again, but the monkeys get loose! Can they be returned?
183	"Marron's Winter Festival"; Transliteration: "Tottoko Chibikuri! Yuki Matsuri" (Japanese: とっとこちびくり! 雪まつり)	January 16, 2004
The Ham-Hams visit Tomy-T, Eggy-P, and Marron, and Marron wants to play in the snow with Penelope, but the crow ladies attack them!
184	"I'm Dad, Hambini!"; Transliteration: "Tottoko Papa Dayo! Chibichanzu" (Japanese: とっとこパパだよ! ちびちゃんず)	January 23, 2004
The Ham-Hams babysit the Hambini brothers.
185	"Baby, the Ogres are Out!"; Transliteration: "Tottoko Akachan! Oni ha Soto" (Japanese: とっとこ赤ちゃん! オニは外)	January 30, 2004
The Ham-Hams and Mr. Yoshi help his son Yamato do the ogre-scaring ritual for Setsubun.
186	"The Knitting Girl and Seamore!"; Transliteration: "Tottoko Amiami Musume to! Kamehamu-kun" (Japanese: とっとこアミアミ娘と! カメハムくん)	February 5, 2004
Seamore meets Barrette, and develops a crush on her.
187	"Mystery of the Valentine Chocolate!"; Transliteration: "Tottoko Nazo no! Barentain Choko" (Japanese: とっとこ謎の! バレンタインチョコ)	February 12, 2004
It's Valentine's Day, and Hamtaro, Oxnard, Boss, Maxwell, Howdy, and Dexter find a gift from secret admirer of one of them. Meanwhile, Laura is shocked that Kana and Travis are hanging out together.
188	"Pashmina's Transformation!"; Transliteration: "Tottoko Henshin! Mafura-chan" (Japanese: とっとこ変身! マフラーちゃん)	February 19, 2004
Pashmina's owner June loves ballet. Sparkle tries to turn Pashmina into a star and makes her and the other Ham-Hams exercise.
189	"I'm Worried About Sis!"; Transliteration: "Tottoko Shinpai! Imouto yo" (Japanese: とっとこ心配! いもうとよ)	February 26, 2004
Sandy gets a cold and the Ham-Hams are worried about her. They take her to Dr. Lion and Flora. Sandy is mad at Stan but Stan is worried about his sister. Will Stan and Sandy forgive each other, and will Stan be able to impress Flora?
190	"Bonjour, Oshare!"; Transliteration: "Tottoko Bonju^ru! Oshare-chan" (Japanese: とっとこボンジュール! おしゃれちゃん)	March 5, 2004
Bijou's French friend Oshare is visiting, and Boss begins to have a crush on her. Who will Boss choose? Bijou or Oshare?
191	"Marron's Little Secret"; Transliteration: "Tottoko Chibikuri! Chiisa na Himitsu" (Japanese: とっとこちびくり! 小さなヒミツ)	March 12, 2004
Marron is keeping Boss and Snoozer awake at night, so Hamtaro takes temporary custody of her, but he has to keep Laura and her parents from seeing her, and she won't stay put. The Ham-Hams, along with Tomy-T and Eggy-P, look for her. But Marron has some tricks up her sleeve...
192	"Sparkle in Hollywood"; Transliteration: "Tottoko Kururin! Hariuddo Nano" (Japanese: とっとこくるりん! ハリウッドなの)	March 19, 2004
Sparkle and her owner Glitter are moving to Hollywood. Sparkle comes to the Clubhouse seeking a boyfriend out of the Ham-Ham boys. All the boys hope to be her boyfriend — except for Hamtaro, who doesn’t know what a boyfriend is. Bijou becomes jealous when Sparkle chooses Hamtaro to be her boyfriend. Hamtaro and Sparkle go on a date at the Ham-Ham Fun Park before she leaves. On the date, Hamtaro falls in love with her. When he holds her hand, Sparkle realizes that although Hamtaro doesn’t quite understand what love is, she returns his feelings and hopes to see him again when she returns from Hollywood. She wishes Bijou good luck in the meantime.
193	"I'm Parting, Clubhouse!"; Transliteration: "Tottoko o Wakare! Chika Hausu" (Japanese: とっとこお別れ! 地下ハウス)	March 26, 2004
Hamtaro, Laura, and her parents have decided to move away. Bijou is heartbroken that her love interest is leaving. On the other hand, Boss, while also upset, sees this as an opportunity to win her over, but instead, ends up making her even more upset by saying Hamtaro will be fine without her. However, Hamtaro isn't going to move after all, but Boss, ashamed of his actions, runs away from home and his friends. Without Boss, is this the end of the Clubhouse? Later, as Laura walks home with Hamtaro and Brandy, she meets a new girl named Mindy.
194	"Lapis and Lazuli!"; Transliteration: "Tottoko Rapisu-chan to! Razuri-chan" (Japanese: とっとこラピスちゃんと! ラズリーちゃん)	April 2, 2004
The Ham-Hams meet two hamster sisters named Lapis and Lazuli and discover their magical world made of candy called Sweet Paradise.
195	"Sweet Paradise"; Transliteration: "Tottoko Sui~chu! Paradaisu" (Japanese: とっとこすい〜ちゅ! ぱらだいす)	April 9, 2004
The Ham-Hams play in Sweet Paradise, but Lapis has second thoughts because she thinks they will eat all of Sweet Paradise, and she thinks that friends are unnecessary as long as she has Lazuli.
196	"A Mysterious Seed Experiment!"; Transliteration: "Tottoko Jikken! Fushigi na Tane" (Japanese: とっとこじっけん! ふしぎなタネ)	April 16, 2004
Lazuli makes a magical seed experiment, but it keeps failing. Meanwhile, Panda and the other Ham-Hams work on the Jewelry House. The episode ends with Lapis thanking Hamtaro for his help, and kisses him on the cheek, much to Bijou's utter shock.
197	"Bijou's in Love!"; Transliteration: "Tottoko Koisuru! Ribon-chan" (Japanese: とっとこ恋する! リボンちゃん)	April 23, 2004
Bijou, still reeling from seeing Lapis kissing Hamtaro in the last episode, begins to fear that a relationship is forming between them, and tries to keep the two of them apart. However, this plan gets complicated when Lapis asks Bijou to help her find Lazuli, who went to Hamtaro's house on her own. At the end of the episode, Lapis resolves the situation by explaining that the kiss was just her way of showing gratitude.
198	"Zuzuzu, Inside the Dream!"; Transliteration: "Tottoko Sukapi^! Yume no Naka" (Japanese: とっとこスカピー! 夢のなか)	April 30, 2004
Snoozer is having a nightmare! The Ham-Hams go into Snoozer's dream to save him.
199	"It's Your Turn, Hero-Ham!"; Transliteration: "Tottoko Dabatto! Hi^ro^hamu" (Japanese: とっとこだばっと! ヒーローハム)	May 7, 2004
Boss becomes Hero-Ham, a mysterious hero, and no one seems to know it's him. He comes to the rescue when the crow ladies attack the Jewelry House!
200	"Bear in Trouble!"; Transliteration: "Tottoko Kumatta! Kuma Jirou" (Japanese: とっとこクマった! クマ次郎)	May 14, 2004
Laura, Kana and Mindy are helping out at Mimi's school, and Mindy's bear cub Kumajiro goes missing at the school. Can the Ham-Hams find the cub?
201	"Talk, Magic Flower!"; Transliteration: "Tottoko Oshaberi! Mahou no Hana" (Japanese: とっとこおしゃべり! 魔法の花)	May 21, 2004
Bijou was saved by a mysterious hero who she thinks was Hamtaro.
202	"It's Art, Otome's Crew!"; Transliteration: "Tottoko A^to Da! Otome・zu^" (Japanese: とっとこアートだ! おとめ・ずー)	May 28, 2004
While playing, Lazuli finds a place with a lot of fun things to play with. The Ham-Hams play along with her, but it turns out they messed up the 'Art Cove' of hamsters named Otome, Lion and Bear, or "Otome's Crew". Otome's crew follows the paint tracks the Ham-Hams left and find them playing at the Jewelry House. They yell at them for messing up their Art Cove, but the Ham-Hams don't know what art is, so Otome and her crew show them their art.
203	"A Mischievous Unicorn!"; Transliteration: "Tottoko Itazura! Yuniko^n" (Japanese: とっとこいたずら! ユニコーン)	June 4, 2004
A candy unicorn is causing mischief in Sweet Paradise, but Oxnard gets blamed for the destruction! Can Oxnard clear his name?
204	"Appearance! Muha-Muha Alien"; Transliteration: "Tottoko Demashita! Muhamuha Seijin" (Japanese: とっとこ出ました! ムハムハ星人)	June 11, 2004
Otome's crew idolizes Hero-Ham after he saves Lion and Bear, but then they want him to get revenge on the Ham-Hams for messing up their Art Cove. So he makes up a lie that there is an evil monster in the Jewelry House called the "Muha-Muha Alien" so Otome's crew will be afraid of going near the Jewelry House and leave the Ham-Hams alone.
205	"A Sweet Worm Surprise"; Transliteration: "Tottoko Bikkuri! Sui~chu Gon" (Japanese: とっとこびっくり! すい〜ちゅゴン)	June 18, 2004
Hamtaro, Oxnard, Lapis, and Snoozer get swallowed by a giant worm when it attacks Sweet Paradise.
206	"Here I Am, Clubhouse!"; Transliteration: "Tottoko Tadaima! Chika Hausu" (Japanese: とっとこただいま! 地下ハウス)	June 25, 2004
Hamtaro, Oxnard, Lapis, and Snoozer are stuck in the worm's stomach. Hero-Ham saves them and reveals himself to be Boss.

=== Season 9 ===
No.	Title	Original release date
207	"The Sweet Milky Way!"; Transliteration: "Tottoko Suichu! Ten no Kawa" (Japanese: とっとこすい〜ちゅ! 天の川)	July 2, 2004
It's a sugar star night in Sweet Paradise, and Marron wants to get them, but she gets into an argument with Lazuli.
208	"Cupid Sparkle!"; Transliteration: "Tottoko Kururin! Kyu^pitto Nano" (Japanese: とっとこくるりん! キューピットなの)	July 9, 2004
Sparkle tries to make Hamtaro and Bijou a couple, but while trying to do so, she starts to have feelings for Hamtaro again.
209	"We're upset! Lapis and Lazuli"; Transliteration: "Tottoko Punpun! Rapisu to Razuri^" (Japanese: とっとこプンプン! ラピスとラズリー)	July 16, 2004
Lapis gets upset with Lazuli after Lazuli messes up their room. Lazuli tries to get a berry to give to Lapis to apologize, but Lapis yells at her and says that it's dangerous to climb so high. This makes Lazuli upset and run away, and so the Ham-Hams help Lapis get a special flower for Lazuli to say she's sorry.
210	"Our Trip to the Sunflowers"; Transliteration: "Tottoko Futari De! Himawari no Tabi" (Japanese: とっとこふたりで! ひまわりの旅)	July 23, 2004
Laura is going to a sunflower field, but when she is helping an old woman, she loses her handbag, and while Hamtaro is trying to get it to her, she leaves on the train without him! Can Hamtaro get back to Laura?
211	"Here Come the Djungarians!"; Transliteration: "Tottoko Kita Jan! Jangaru Oukoku" (Japanese: とっとこ来たジャン! ジャンガル王国)	July 30, 2004
The Ham-Hams discover the Djungarian kingdom and meet djungarian hamsters who dress like animals and plants, but the Cactus Brothers steal Lazuli's magic hourglass.
212	"Summertime, Searching for the Treasure!"; Transliteration: "Tottoko Natsu Jan! O Takara Sagashi" (Japanese: とっとこ夏ジャン! お宝さがし)	August 6, 2004
The Ham-Hams search for treasure in the Djungarian kingdom, but Otome, Lion, and Bear want to find it first.
213	"Swimming in the Jungle!"; Transliteration: "Tottoko Janjan! Oyogu Noda" (Japanese: とっとこジャンジャン! 泳ぐのだ)	August 13, 2004
The Ham-Hams continue to chase the Cactus Brothers to retrieve Lazuli's hourglass. It falls into the sea, and the Ham-Hams dress like sea creatures to make friends with the sea-dwelling Djungarians.
214	"Become the King of the Jungle!"; Transliteration: "Tottoko Naru Jan! Ousama Jan!" (Japanese: とっとこなるジャン! 王様ジャン!)	August 20, 2004
The Ham-Hams get Lazuli's hourglass back, but the Cactus Brothers want to become king and they take the hourglass again.
215	"Let's Do It, Otome!"; Transliteration: "Tottoko Yaru Jan! Otome-chan" (Japanese: とっとこやるジャン! おとめちゃん)	August 27, 2004
The Ham-Hams get the hourglass back, and Otome tries to be queen.
216	"The Changing Mirror"; Transliteration: "Tottoko Kagami De! Torikaekko" (Japanese: とっとこ鏡で! とりかえっこ)	September 3, 2004
Elder Ham and Auntie Viv are surprised that hamsters can eat sweets, but they happily join the Ham-Hams playing in Sweet Paradise, but then a magic mirror makes Auntie Viv and Bijou switch places. When Hamtaro tries to figure a way to change them back to themselves, he gets himself switched with Elder Ham.
217	"I Want to See You, Wan!"; Transliteration: "Tottoko Wan-chan! Ai Tai Kimochi" (Japanese: とっとこワンちゃん! 会いたい気持ち)	September 10, 2004
The Ham-Hams and Mindy's grandfather take care of a sick dog.
218	"Sparkling Fashion!"; Transliteration: "Tottoko Kirakira! Oshare Dechu" (Japanese: とっとこキラキラ! おしゃれでちゅ)	September 17, 2004
Maria styles Laura and Kana's hair, and Bijou and the other Ham-Girls try out new fashions too.
219	"Dashing Robin-Ham!"; Transliteration: "Tottoko Inasena! Hamuhamu Kozou" (Japanese: とっとこいなせな! ハムハム小僧)	September 24, 2004
The Ham-Hams fall asleep in the Jewelry House and dream of Robin-Ham again.
220	"Big Penelope!"; Transliteration: "Tottoko Biggu Na! Chibimaru-chan" (Japanese: とっとこビッグな! ちび丸ちゃん)	October 1, 2004
One of Lazuli's experiments makes Penelope huge, Boss small, and Oxnard even tinier! Can they return to normal?
221	"The Little Cheering Team!"; Transliteration: "Tottoko Chicchana! Ouendan" (Japanese: とっとこちっちゃな! 応援団)	October 8, 2004
Laura's school has a sports day, but Maki's grandpa can't make it because one of the horses at their ranch is in labor. So the Ham-Hams try to find a way to cheer Maki on for her grandpa.
222	"Flying Ham-Hams!"; Transliteration: "Tottoko Tobi Masu! Hamuchanzu" (Japanese: とっとこ飛びます! ハムちゃんず)	October 15, 2004
Lazuli sees a flying hamster calling Hamtaro's name. Hamtaro says he met a hamster like that once in a dream. It turns out to be Prince Bo, and he needs the Ham-Hams' help to get his umbrella back from a shark that has the umbrella stuck in its teeth.
223	"Eternal Hero"; Transliteration: "Tottoko Hi^ro^! Eien Ni" (Japanese: とっとこヒーロー! 永遠に)	October 22, 2004
Otome's crew continues to idol Hero-Ham, still not knowing it's Boss, and they keep Lapis up all night with the noise from their building tributes to Hero-Ham and statues of who he's defeated (the Three Crow Ladies from 199 and the Muha-Muha Alien, who was also Boss in disguise, from episode 204). Lazuli makes seeds that bring the statues to life, but the evil statues mess up Otome's crew's Hero-Ham tribute. The Ham-Hams come up with a plan to save the day.
224	"Djungarian's Halloween"; Transliteration: "Tottoko Jangaru! Harouin Jan" (Japanese: とっとこジャンガル! ハロウィンじゃん)	October 29, 2004
It's Halloween and the Djungarians are visiting. The Ham-Hams have a Halloween celebration, but Otome and her crew get scared because they think that the Ham-Hams in their costumes are monsters.
225	"Troublesome Magical Seeds"; Transliteration: "Tottoko Komattane! Mahou no Tane" (Japanese: とっとこコマッタネ! 魔法のタネ)	November 5, 2004
Boss wants to ask Bijou on a date. He goes to Sweet Paradise and finds a basket with seeds in it. He eats one of them, but it is one of Lazuli's magic seeds and it makes a duplicate Boss appear. The duplicate Boss wears a blue kimono and is much cooler, and it tries to go on a date with Bijou instead of the real Boss. Meanwhile, Howdy comes and eats the rest of the seeds, and several duplicate Howdys appear. They all tell Hamtaro and the others horrible jokes just like the real Howdy, and they can't stand it, so Lapis and Lazuli make a potion to get rid of the duplicates.
226	"Flora's Wedding!"; Transliteration: "Tottoko Kekkon! Na^su-chan" (Japanese: とっとこ結婚! ナースちゃん)	November 12, 2004
Flora is in shock! She had heard that she is going to get married. Stan is heartbroken. But it turns out that it was Dr Lion's monkey, Pepe marrying the female monkey, not Flora. Stan begins to ride with wild boars.
227	"Talk, Bow-Wow Cookies!"; Transliteration: "Tottoko O Hanashi! Wanwan Kukki^" (Japanese: とっとこおはなし! わんわんクッキー)	November 19, 2004
Hamtaro is upset because something is wrong with Brandy. Lazuli creates Dog Cookies so all dogs can now talk. They even gave Maria's dog, Lily, some. Is Brandy going to talk for the rest of his life?
228	"Being a Dad Can Be Painful!"; Transliteration: "Tottoko Papa Dajie! Tsuraijie" (Japanese: とっとこパパだじぇ! つらいじぇ)	November 26, 2004
Boss is drawing Bijou, but it doesn't turn out right. One of Lazuli's magic seeds brings the drawing to life, and Boss names it Shiron.
229	"Sparkle's Art!"; Transliteration: "Tottoko Kururin! A^to Nano" (Japanese: とっとこくるりん! アートなの)	December 3, 2004
Sparkle visits again and meets Otome, Lion, and Bear. Sparkle and Otome compete to see whose art is better, but they get caught in a snowstorm.
230	"Lucky, Sweet Fortunetelling!"; Transliteration: "Tottoko Rakki^! Sui~chu Uranai" (Japanese: とっとこラッキー! すい〜ちゅ占い)	December 10, 2004
The Ham-Hams learn fortune-telling with Lapis and Lazuli.
231	"Arriving to Your Smile!"; Transliteration: "Tottoko Fuusen! Egao Nitodoke" (Japanese: とっとこ風船! 笑顔にとどけ)	December 17, 2004
While Christmas shopping, Laura and her mom meet a little girl who is going to her grandmother's house, and she has drawn a picture for her grandmother, but she loses it on the bus. The Ham-Hams try to help get her picture to her grandmother.
232	"It's Santa, Merry Christmas!"; Transliteration: "Tottoko Santa Da! Meri^ Kurisumachu" (Japanese: とっとこサンタだ! メリーくりすまちゅ)	December 24, 2004
Harmony tells the Ham-Hams that Santa Ham (who just so happens to look like Elder Ham) is sick, so they deliver presents for him. But Spat has something evil planned...

=== Season 10 ===
No.	Title	Original release date
233	"Auspicious Angels!"; Transliteration: "Tottoko Medetai! Enjieruzu" (Japanese: とっとこめでたい! えんじぇるず)	January 7, 2005
Hamtaro and Laura fall asleep on New Year's Eve and dream about a feudal Japan. Hamtaro is Sheriff Sunflower, Dexter is an evil nobleman, and Bijou, Sandy, Pashmina, and Penelope are called the "Auspicious Angels".
234	"See You Again, Snowman!"; Transliteration: "Tottoko Mata Ne! Yuki Daruma" (Japanese: とっとこまたね! 雪だるま)	January 14, 2005
Lazuli does an experiment that makes it snow in Sweet Paradise, and the Ham-Hams make a giant snowman that comes to life!
235	"Non Non, Oshare!"; Transliteration: "Tottoko Non Non! Oshare-chan" (Japanese: とっとこノンノン! おしゃれちゃん)	January 21, 2005
Maria's friend Katrinne visits from France again, and Oshare visits the Ham-Hams. Oshare and the Ham-Hams see a man being mean to Katrinne, but it is really just one of her acts. Oshare and the Ham-Hams don't know this, however, and they try to save her.
236	"There Are Ogres, Ham-Hams!"; Transliteration: "Tottoko Oni Dayo! Hamuchanzu" (Japanese: とっとこオニだよ! ハムちゃんず)	January 28, 2005
The Ham-Hams think they're turning into ogres when they start growing horns.
237	"Hot-Blooded Rainbow Girls"; Transliteration: "Tottoko Atsui no! Reinbo^ga^ruzu" (Japanese: とっとこ熱いの! レインボーガールズ)	February 4, 2005
The Ham-Hams meet the Rainbow Girls, loyal servants to Prince Bo, and they need to take a special basket to a high floating island.
238	"Love Love, Valentine!"; Transliteration: "Tottoko Suki Suki! Barentain Nano" (Japanese: とっとこすきすき! バレンタインなの)	February 11, 2005
It's Valentine's Day, and Sparkle wants to give a present to Hamtaro. She goes to Sweet Paradise, and she sees Lapis and Lazuli picking seeds from a tree. Lapis says it's Lazuli's newest experiment, "suki suki" seeds. Sparkle thinks Lapis will give Hamtaro one of the seeds to make him love Lapis. Lapis gives Sparkle 3 of the seeds, and she tries to give them to Hamtaro, but she keeps losing them! Can she retrieve the seeds for Hamtaro?
239	"Sweet Paradise Disappears!"; Transliteration: "Tottoko Kie Chau! Sui~chu Paradaisu" (Japanese: とっとこ消えちゃう! すい〜ちゅぱらだいす)	February 18, 2005
Omar visits, and the Ham-Hams show him Sweet Paradise. He shows them what he got on his trip around the world. But Oxnard crashes into him, and all his things go everywhere! The Ham-Hams pick all his stuff up, but Oxnard accidentally puts the magical stone that keeps Sweet Paradise from disappearing in Omar's bag, and Sweet Paradise begins to disappear. Can the Ham-Hams get the stone back and save Sweet Paradise?
240	"You're Late, Prince!"; Transliteration: "Tottoko Chikoku Da! Ouji Sama" (Japanese: とっとこちこくだ! 王子さま)	February 25, 2005
The Ham-Hams meet Radar, a prince who is marrying Princess Championi, but Radar gets lost while searching for his wedding present. The Ham-Hams help him get to his wedding in time.
241	"Hyper Robo-Joe!"; Transliteration: "Tottoko Haipa^! Meka Jirou" (Japanese: とっとこハイパー! メカじろう)	March 4, 2005
Otome's crew is in trouble, and Robo-Joe saves them with his new features.
242	"Nice To See You, Pepper!"; Transliteration: "Tottoko Yoroshiku! Jajahamu-chan" (Japanese: とっとこヨロシク! じゃじゃハムちゃん)	March 11, 2005
The Ham-Hams throw a welcome party for Pepper at the Jewelry House.
243	"Let's Travel, Ham-Ham Train!"; Transliteration: "Tottoko Hashiru yo! Hamu Hamu Torein" (Japanese: とっとこ走るよ! ハムハムトレイ)	March 18, 2005
The Ham-Hams ride the Ham-Ham train to the Sunflower Kingdom and meet the King and his daughter, the Sunflower Princess.
244	"Pfpth, A Big Panic!"; Transliteration: "Tottoko Devi tto! Dai Panikku" (Japanese: とっとこデビっと! 大パニック)	March 25, 2005
Spat zaps Bijou, Boss, Stan, Howdy, Dexter, Oxnard, and Penelope. Hamtaro and the others try to save them just as Harmony arrives to help. Will the other Ham-Hams return to their old selves again? And will Sweet Paradise be closed forever?
245	"Snoozer Disappears!"; Transliteration: "Tottoko Kie Ta! Neteru-kun" (Japanese: とっとこ消えた! ねてるくん)	April 1, 2005
Boss can't find Snoozer, so the Ham-Hams help him search.
246	"Laura's Date"; Transliteration: "Tottoko Roko-chan! Dokidoki De^to" (Japanese: とっとこロコちゃん! ドキドキデート)	April 8, 2005
The Ham-Hams learn about a date. Oxnard dreams about a date with Pepper, Maxwell and Sandy are on a date reading books. Hamtaro was late to meet up with Bijou for a walk and now Bijou is mad at him.
247	"Elder-Ham Views the Cherry Blossoms"; Transliteration: "Tottoko Chourou! O Hanami Ja" (Japanese: とっとこ長老! お花見じゃ)	April 15, 2005
Elder-Ham and the Ham-Hams watch cherry blossoms on a boat.
248	"We Are The Best of Friends!"; Transliteration: "Tottoko Futari Ha! Besuto Furendo" (Japanese: とっとこ二人は! ベストフレンド)	April 22, 2005
Dexter and his owner Curtis are going to move. Howdy is afraid of what might happen to his friend. Are Howdy and Dexter going to be rivals or friends?
249	"The First Love Letter"; Transliteration: "Tottoko Hajimete! Rabureta^" (Japanese: とっとこはじめて! ラブレター)	April 29, 2005
Laura gets a love letter, and the Ham-Hams must find out who sent the letter to Laura.
250	"It's Useless! Zack and his Mom"; Transliteration: "Tottoko Akan De! Okan to Sadakichi" (Japanese: とっとこアカンで! おかんとサダ吉)	May 6, 2005
It's Mother's Day and Zack wants to give his mother Goldie something, and so the Ham-Hams help him.
251	"Oh No, Hamtaro!"; Transliteration: "Tottoko Shimatta! Hamutaro" (Japanese: とっとこしまった! ハム太郎)	May 13, 2005
After hide and seek, Hamtaro is at Mindy's place, and Boss takes his place so Laura won't know he's missing. Will Hamtaro not go home to his owner?
252	"Fluffy Gelato"; Transliteration: "Tottoko Fuwafuwa! Jiera^do-chan" (Japanese: とっとこふわふわ! ジェラードちゃん)	May 20, 2005
The Ham-Hams meet Gelato, a hamster not from Earth. Boss develops a crush on her.
253	"A Piping Hot Battle!"; Transliteration: "Tottoko Koi no! Atsuatsu Batoru" (Japanese: とっとこ恋の! あつあつバトル)	May 27, 2005
While the Ham-Hams are visiting Potato and Shake, they meet a new ham named Broski. Broski begins to fall for Shake, so Potato and Broski have a contest to see who the winner is for Shake's heart.
254	"Can You Trade It?"; Transliteration: "Tottoko Te to Tede! Torikaekko" (Japanese: とっとこ手と手で! とりかえっこ)	June 3, 2005
Laura is mad at Hamtaro because he bit her brooch. Hamtaro wants to find something to give her so Laura will forgive him.
255	"Marron is Upset!"; Transliteration: "Tottoko Puripuri! Chibikuri-chan" (Japanese: とっとこプリプリ! ちびくりちゃん)	June 10, 2005
Marron gets angry at Sabu when he stops Eggy-P and Tomy-T from eating his nuts and seeds. So the Ham-Hams and Sabu try to make a sup to Marron to get her to forgive him.
256	"A Lost Thing of Smiles!"; Transliteration: "Tottoko Egao no! Otoshimono" (Japanese: とっとこ笑顔の! おとしもの)	June 17, 2005
Laura and her classmates go on a field trip to a flower garden with Mr. Yoshi, and the Ham-Hams tag along. When they get there, the place is covered in trash! Both the students and the Ham-Hams help to clean up the garden, but Laura loses her pendant that has her feelings for Travis written inside. So Hamtaro tries to get it back to her before Travis finds it.
257	"Space Ham-Hams"; Transliteration: "Tottoko Supe^su! Hamuchanzu" (Japanese: とっとこスペース! ハムちゃんず)	June 24, 2005
After Laura reads a Star Wars book to Hamtaro, he dreams that he is like Star Wars with his friends.

=== Season 11 ===
No.	Title	Original release date
258	"Go Go, Ham-Hams!"; Transliteration: "Tottoko Go^go^! Hamuchanzu" (Japanese: とっとこゴーゴー! ハムちゃんず)	July 7, 2005
The Ham-Hams have a Go Cart race. The winner will receive a year's worth of sunflower seeds. Hamtaro and Boss fall into the sea. To Be Continued...
259	"Start, Ham-Hams!"; Transliteration: "Tottoko Supa^to! Hamuchanzu" (Japanese: とっとこスパート! ハムちゃんず)	July 8, 2005
Ham-Ham Go Cart racing continues! They race all their friends but the winner in the end was no doubt Auntie Viv.
260	"Crossing The Sky, Skyham!"; Transliteration: "Tottoko Aka Ra! Sorahamu-kun" (Japanese: とっとこ空から! そらハムくん)	July 15, 2005
The Ham-Hams meet Skyham, whose dream is to cross the sky.
261	"Okini, the Seedgatherer"; Transliteration: "Tottoko Tane Yade! O^kini^-chan" (Japanese: とっとこタネやで! オーキニーちゃん)	July 22, 2005
The Ham-Hams meet Okini, who has taken Skyham's hang-glider, and they try to get it back from her. But that may prove to be more difficult than they thought...
262	"Fortune Telling, Atarinchu"; Transliteration: "Tottoko Uranai! Atarinchu" (Japanese: とっとこ占い! あたりんちゅ)	July 29, 2005
The Ham-Hams meet fortune-tellers Mystery and Magical.
263	"Pitter-patter, Hamha Tree"; Transliteration: "Tottoko Patapata! Hamuha^ no Ki" (Japanese: とっとこパタパタ! ハムハーの木)	August 5, 2005
Hamtaro, Boss, Oxnard, Howdy, and Dexter are on Hamha Tree, and Okini won't let them search for treasure. Will they find the treasure of sunflower seeds?
264	"Let's Dance, Ham-Ham Ondo"; Transliteration: "Tottoko Odoru Zo! Hamuhamu Ondo" (Japanese: とっとこおどるぞ! ハムハム音頭)	August 12, 2005
It's a festival, and the Ham-Hams make their own festival, but Penelope, Marron, Lazuli, and Magical are missing.
265	"Let's Enjoy the Sunflower Field!"; Transliteration: "Tottoko Waratte! Himawari Hatake" (Japanese: とっとこ笑って! ひまわり畑)	August 19, 2005
While Laura and her parents are visiting their friends, the Ham-Hams see Solara again.
266	"Summer, Broski!"; Transliteration: "Tottoko Natsu Sa^! Sa^fa^-kun" (Japanese: とっとこ夏サー! サーファーくん)	August 26, 2005
The Ham-Hams go to the beach with Pepper. Pepper meets the Ham-Hams' friends, Seamore and Broski. Pepper wanted Broski to teach her how to surf, but he couldn't. Will Oxnard be able to save his love from drowning?
267	"Hesitation! Don't Give Up!"; Transliteration: "Tottoko Mayoi Wo! Kettobase" (Japanese: とっとこ迷いを! けっとばせ)	September 2, 2005
Roberto keeps being unfriendly, and Laura is worried. Meanwhile, the Ham-Hams notice that Roberto is a really good shot in soccer, so they practice to be as good as Roberto.
268	"Ice and Lolly"; Transliteration: "Tottoko Aisu-kun to! Kyandei^-chan" (Japanese: とっとこアイスくんと! キャンディーちゃん)	September 9, 2005
The Ham-Hams meet sibling storytellers/ice-cream vendors Ice and Lolly.
269	"Satisfied Bijou"; Transliteration: "Tottoko Hokuhoku! Ribon-chan" (Japanese: とっとこホクホク! リボンちゃん)	September 16, 2005
Bijou is going on a date with Hamtaro because Mystery and Magical told her fortune. Will Bijou make it on time to have the date with Hamtaro?
270	"Dig, Dig, Mole!"; Transliteration: "Tottoko Horuhoru! Moguru-kun" (Japanese: とっとこほるほる! もぐるくん)	September 23, 2005
The Ham-Hams meet Mole, a hamster who likes to dig.
271	"Hamha-Man the Justice Hero"; Transliteration: "Tottoko Seigi no! Hamuha^man" (Japanese: とっとこ正義の! ハムハーマン)	September 30, 2005
Hamtaro dreams that he is a superhero, Maxwell is a villain, and Otome, Lion and Bear too. Will Justice Hero Hamha-Man save his friends?
272	"Fired up, Sports Day!"; Transliteration: "Tottoko Moe yo! Undoukai" (Japanese: とっとこ燃えよ! 運動会)	October 7, 2005
It's Sports day, and Auntie Viv and Elder-Ham come up with a challenge, Ham-Ham Girls vs Ham-Ham Boys. Who will win the challenge?
273	"It's Art, Sandy!"; Transliteration: "Tottoko A^to Da! Torahamu-chan" (Japanese: とっとこアートだ! トラハムちゃん)	October 14, 2005
Laura, Kana, and their families go to the museum and the Ham-Hams do too. Sandy begin to likes art and wants to go see them again, but her brother Stan was busy trying to impress girls. So Maxwell goes with her, but Stan is worried about his dear sister. The Ham-Hams must find Maxwell and Sandy before Laura and her parents leave the museum.
274	"Why Nande"; Transliteration: "Tottoko Nande! Nande-kun" (Japanese: とっとこなんで! なんでくん)	October 21, 2005
The Ham-Hams meet Nande, a Ham-Ham who asks "Why?" all the time.
275	"Showtime, Okini!"; Transliteration: "Tottoko O^kini! Sho^taimu Nano" (Japanese: とっとこオーキニ! ショータイムなの)	October 28, 2005
Sparkle meets Okini, and Okini plans a show for Sparkle to make money off of her.
276	"So Popular! Being a man is hard" Transliteration: "Tottoko Motemote! Otoko Hatsuraijie" (Japanese: とっとこモテモテ! 男はつらいじぇ)	November 4, 2005
Ms. Mystery tells Boss's fortune - that he is close to girls; Bijou, Pashmina, Penelope, Lapis, Lazuli and Okini, but he finds out that he is close to his friends and not just girls specifically.
277	"I'm a Lady! Lapis!"; Transliteration: "Tottoko Redei yo! Rapisu-chan" (Japanese: とっとこレディよ! ラピスちゃん)	November 11, 2005
Lapis is mad at her sister Lazuli after she messes up their room, and Stan wants a date with Lapis. Will Lapis forgive her sister or not?
278	"Once Again! Why is that?" Transliteration: "Tottoko Matamata! Nande Yanon" (Japanese: とっとこまたまた! なんでやのん)	November 18, 2005
Skyham comes to play at the Clubhouse, but Nande is in the Clubhouse, and has been keeping Boss and Snoozer up all night. Jingle talks to Nande, and Nande becomes like Skyham and vice versa.
279	"A Miracle, Magical!"; Transliteration: "Tottoko Mirakuru! Majikaru-kun" (Japanese: とっとこミラクル! マジカルくん)	November 25, 2005
Nande meets Mystery and Magical, and Magical tries to be as good as Mystery is at magic tricks.
280	"Peron! Chestnut Alien"; Transliteration: "Tottoko Pero^n ! Yakiguri Seijin" (Japanese: とっとこペローン! やきぐり星人)	December 2, 2005
Penelope and Lazuli see Gelato and play with chestnuts.
281	"Tux and Salia!"; Transliteration: "Tottoko Penhamu-kun to! Azarashi-chan" (Japanese: とっとこペンハムくんと! あざらしちゃん)	December 9, 2005
The Ham-Hams meet Tux and Salia.
282	"Shaking, the Monster of Winter!"; Transliteration: "Tottoko Buruburu! Fuyu no Obake" (Japanese: とっとこぶるぶる! 冬のおばけ)	December 16, 2005
Laura and Kana become reporters for the school and are afraid when they think there's a monster at the school.
283	"A Christmas Ride!"; Transliteration: "Tottoko Kurisumasu! Raidoon" (Japanese: とっとこクリスマス! ライドオン)	December 23, 2005
The Ham-Hams make Hamha Tree into a Christmas tree, and Okini develops a crush on Broski, but Broski begins to get sick.

=== Season 12 ===
No.	Title	Original release date
284	"Happy Dream, Ham-Ham Train!"; Transliteration: "Tottoko Hatsuyume! Hamuhamu Torein" (Japanese: とっとこ初夢! ハムハムトレイン)	January 6, 2006
Hamtaro dreams that he drives a train to deliver letters, but Boss, Okini, Mystery, and Magical are pirates trying to hijack the train.
285	"Oxnard and Pepper"; Transliteration: "Tottoko Koushi-kun to! Jajahamu-chan" (Japanese: とっとここうしくんと! じゃじゃハムちゃん)	January 13, 2006
Laura and Kana and their parents visit Dylan's farm, and Oxnard wants to tell Pepper that he loves her, and at the end of the episode, Oxnard stays with Pepper and Dylan.
286	"A Strange Love! Skyham"; Transliteration: "Tottoko Koisuru! Sorahamu-kun" (Japanese: とっとこ恋する! そらハムくん)	January 20, 2006
Skyham begins to have a crush on Pashmina, Howdy and Dexter begin to be jealous, and Penelope is upset and she runs away from her best friend. After the Ham-Hams save Penelope from a cat, Skyham tells Pashmina that he loves her, but Pashmina doesn't want to have a relationship, but she likes her friends and best friend Penelope, because she is gentle to all Ham-Hams, and Skyham is brokenhearted.
287	"Caw, Caw, A Crow Problem!"; Transliteration: "Tottoko Ka^Ka^! Kanninshiteya" (Japanese: とっとこカーカー! かんにんしてや)	January 27, 2006
Crows bother Laura and her friends, so the Ham-Hams try to scare the crows away.
288	"Okini is a Mom!"; Transliteration: "Tottoko Okan Da! O^kini^-chan" (Japanese: とっとこおかんだ! オーキニーちゃん)	February 3, 2006
Flora gives the Ham-Hams a job to babysit the Little Hams, but Okini and the Little Hams get caught underground, and the Ham-Hams have to save them.
289	"A Valentine Battle!"; Transliteration: "Tottoko Batoru Da! Barentain" (Japanese: とっとこバトルだ! バレンタイン)	February 10, 2006
It's Valentine's Day, and Glitter visits and wants to give a valentine gift to Travis, but Laura is sick at home. In the Ham-Ham Clubhouse, Oshare and Sparkle visit to give Hamtaro valentine gifts, and Bijou does too, so they have a contest to make valentine chocolate for Hamtaro. Who will win Hamtaro's heart? Will it be: Bijou, Oshare or Sparkle? Note: Oshare has a crush on Hamtaro this episode.
290	"Skyham is a Hero!"; Transliteration: "Tottoko Hi^ro^! Sorahamu-kun" (Japanese: とっとこヒーロー! そらハムくん)	February 17, 2006
Skyham helps some hens on Mr. Yoshi and Charlotte's farm.
291	"Super Digger Robo-Joe!"; Transliteration: "Tottoko Horimasu! Meka Jirou" (Japanese: とっとこほります! メカじろう)	February 24, 2006
Robo-Joe has a new feature; digging!
292	"Second Graduation!"; Transliteration: "Tottoko Nikiniki! Sotsugyou Degojaru" (Japanese: とっとこニキニキ! 卒業でごじゃる)	March 3, 2006
Nin-Ham gets kicked out of ninja school again, so the Ham-Hams decide to help him.
293	"Setting Off, Spring's Wind!"; Transliteration: "Tottoko Tabidachi! Haru no Kaze" (Japanese: とっとこ旅立ち! 春の風)	March 10, 2006
Travis is moving away, and Laura is upset, so the Ham-Hams try to give Travis all good memories for his friends. Will Laura tell him that she likes him before he leaves?
294	"A Picnic Date!"; Transliteration: "Tottoko De^to De! Pikunikku" (Japanese: とっとこデートで! ピクニック)	March 17, 2006
Zack plans a date for Goldie and Curtis.
295	"The Lovable Brandy"; Transliteration: "Tottoko Don-chan! Daisuki Don-chan" (Japanese: とっとこどんちゃん! 大好きどんちゃん)	March 24, 2006
The Ham-Hams help Brandy win a dog contest.
296	"Happy Ham-Ham Wedding"; Transliteration: "Tottoko Happi^! Hamuhamu Uedeingu" (Japanese: とっとこハッピー! ハムハムウエディング)	March 31, 2006
Oxnard and Pepper are going to get married and all the Ham-Hams are happy to watch Oxnard and Pepper get married. Meanwhile, Laura, Kana, Mindy, Roberto, Kylie and June get letters from Travis and he is fine in a new town and has new friends.

== OVAs ==
No.	Title	Original release date	English air date
1	"3000 Hammy Steps In Search Of Mommy"; Transliteration: "Tottoko Hamutaro: Hamutaro no Otanjoubi ~Mama wo Tazunete Sanzen Techitechi" (Japanese: ハム太郎のおたんじょうび〜ママをたずねて三千てちてち〜)	August 6, 2001	August 6, 2003 (Canada & UK), August 31, 2003 (US)
Laura tells Hamtaro about his mother. Just in time for his birthday, Hamtaro sets out with Boss and Oxnard to visit his mother, while the other Ham-Hams set up a surprise birthday party for him. Note: When this episode was aired in America, the entire adventure was edited out, showing only the beginning where the Ham-Hams were telling everyone to keep Hamtaro's birthday a secret and the ending where all the Ham-Hams are singing for Hamtaro's birthday. This was because ShoPro decided that the OVA was too deep for children.
2	"Ham-Hams Ahoy!"; Transliteration: "Tottoko Hamutaro: Hamuchanzu no Takara Sagashi Daisaku Hamuha! Sutekina Umi Nonatsuyasumi" (Japanese: ハムちゃんずの宝さがし大作戦〜はむはー!すてきな海のなつやすみ〜)	August 6, 2002	August 6, 2003 (Canada & UK), August 31, 2003 (US)
As Laura heads out to summer camp, Hamtaro and Oxnard come across a young girl by the name of Haibi, who's trying to find the ocean. Haibi found a treasure map while searching through the storage burrow and is now willing to find the treasure to help her heat exhausted granny. The Ham-Hams, who are more than willing to help her, pack their things and set out to find the treasure. Note: At the end of the Japanese version of this OVA they have the Ham-Ham drinking alcohol (well champagne), at the end during the party they have.
3	"Rainbow Rescue"; Transliteration: "Tottoko Hamutaro: Hamuchanzu to Niji no Kuni no Oujisama, Sekaideichibannotakaramono" (Japanese: ハムちゃんずと虹の国の王子さま~せかいでいちばんのたからもの~)	August 6, 2003	N/A
Based on the third Hamtaro game (fourth in Japan), Prince Bo falls from the sky when the rainbow disappears. Now Hamtaro and the Ham-Hams must help him bring back the rainbow. Note: This OVA was also not aired in America.
4	"Ham-Ham Games"; Transliteration: "Tottoko Hamutaro: Hamuchanzu no Mezase! Hamuhamu Kin Medaru! Hashire! Hashire! Daisakusen" (Japanese: ハムちゃんずのめざせ!ハムハム金メダル 〜はしれ!はしれ!だいさくせん〜)	August 6, 2004	August 13, 2004 (Canada), August 21, 2004 (US), September 9, 2004 (UK)
Considered the prequel to the fourth Hamtaro game (fifth in Japan). In this tribute to the 2004 Olympics, Hamtaro and the Ham-Hams are tasked by Prince Bo with lighting the everlasting torch to Hamcropolis. However, the Rainbow Girls will not allow this and pursue the Ham-Hams

== Films ==
No.	Title	Original release date
1	"Adventures in Ham-Ham Land"; Transliteration: "Gekijō-ban Tottoko Hamutaro: Hamu-Hamu Rando Daibōken" (Japanese: 劇場版 とっとこハム太郎 ハムハムランド大冒険)	December 15, 2001
After a wish from Hamtaro to be able to talk to his owner Laura, the Ham-Hams travel to Ham-Ham Land to search for a magical sunflower seed to make it happen. But, if they can't get the sunflower seed and return home in time, then they'll be stuck in Ham-Ham Land forever! And there's an evil wizard bent on stopping them! Note: This film was released as a double feature in theaters with Godzilla, Mothra and King Ghidorah: Giant Monsters All-Out Attack.
2	"The Captive Princess"; Transliteration: "Gekijō-ban Tottoko Hamutarō: Hamu Hamu Hamūja! Maboroshi no Purinsesu" (Japanese: 劇場版とっとこハム太郎 ハムハムハムージャ! 幻のプリンセス)	December 14, 2002
One day, Hamtaro has a dream that there is a princess living in a golden desert palace asking him for help! He feels concerned about her and the Ham-Hams go on a journey to rescue the princess. In her kingdom, an evil desert cat wants to marry the princess to take over and become king. Will Hamtaro be able to rescue the princess successfully and save the kingdom? Note: This film was released as a double feature in theaters with Godzilla Against Mechagodzilla.
3	"Miracle in Aurora Valley"; Transliteration: "Gekijō-ban Tottoko Hamutarō Hamu-Hamu Guran Purin: Ōrora Tani no Kiseki - Ribon-chan Kiki Ippatsu!" (Japanese: 劇場版とっとこハム太郎ハムハムグランプリン オーロラ谷の奇跡 リボンちゃん危機一髪!)	December 13, 2003
Bijou is captured by the pirate captain Hamstern, who thinks she is the snow princess, so Hamtaro has to compete with Hamstern in order to rescue her. Note: This film was released as a double feature in theaters with Godzilla: Tokyo S.O.S..
4	"The Mysterious Oni Picture Book Tower"; Transliteration: "Gekijō-ban Tottoko Hamutarō Hamu Hamu Paradaichu!: Hamutarō to Fushigi no Oni no Ehon-tō" (Japanese: 劇場版とっとこハム太郎はむはむぱらだいちゅ! ハム太郎とふしぎのオニの絵本塔)	December 23, 2004
Ayayamu is a pretty hamster who excelled at everything–as a child-prodigy in school, sports and even drawing and writing. One day, however, she overhears her friends making fun of a picture book she loved and had given to one of them. She is so devastated that she decides she doesn’t need friends anymore, locks herself into the library and hasn’t taken a single step outside ever since. The God of Books sympathizes with her and gives her a Magic Quill with which she can effortlessly draw any picture and write any story she wants. Meanwhile, Hamtaro learns that Laura and her fellow students will put on "Sunflower Taro" as their next school play. Hamtaro and friends decide that they, too, want to try their hand at acting and prepare their own version of "Sunflower Taro". In the course of preparing for the play, they are suddenly sucked into a strange Picture Book Tower, where Ayayamu tells them that they will be characters in her new book – a new and exciting version of the well-known fairy tale "Sunflower Taro". You can tell that things are getting off to an interesting start – as they always do when the Ham-Hams are involved!! Note: This film was released as a double feature in theaters with Inuyasha the Movie: Fire on the Mystic Island.

=== Box office ===
Box office performance in Japan
Title	Year	Gross revenue	Ref
Adventures in Ham-Ham Land	2001	¥2,710,000,000 ($25,000,000)	
The Captive Princess	2002	¥1,910,000,000	
Miracle in Aurora Valley	2003	¥1,300,000,000	
Total		¥5,920,000,000	
