= Hussein Who Said No =

- Directed by: Ahmad Reza Darvish
- Written by: Ahmad Reza Darvish
- Produced by: Taghi Aligholizadeh Delta Media Aqua Falls
- Starring: Arash Aasefi; Shaghayegh Farahani; Anoushirvan Arjmand; Pouria Poursorkh; Hasan Pourshirazi; Farhad Ghaemian; Babak Hamidian; Bahador Zamani; Mahtab Keramati; David Sterne
- Cinematography: Hossein Jafarian; Alireza Barazandeh
- Edited by: Tariq Anwar
- Music by: Stephen Warbeck
- Production companies: Galaxy Studios; Molinare Film & TV
- Distributed by: Taghi Aligholizadeh
- Release date: February 1, 2014
- Running time: 160 minutes
- Country: Iran
- Language: Persian

Hussein Who Said No (Persian: رستاخیز translit Rastâxiz, meaning Resurrection) is a 2014 Iranian historical film directed by Ahmad Reza Darvish. The story narrates Battle of Karbala on Day of Ashura and tells the uprising of Hussein ibn Ali in 680 CE against Yazid ibn Muawiyah ibn Abu Sufyan. The story of the movie is centered around Bukair ibn Al-Hurr ibn Yazid Al-Tamimi Ar-Riyahi.

The Persian-language movie has been dubbed into a number of languages including English, Arabic (with title The Sacrifice (Arabic: القربان, romanized: Alqurban)) and Bangla.

== Plot ==
After the death of Mu'awiyah, son of Abu Sufyan, Yazid ibn Mu'awiyah calls himself Caliph of the Muslims and writes a letter to the governor of Medina asking Imam Hussein to pay Allegiance. Bukair ibn Harr, who has been chosen as the special courier of the court of Yazid ibn Mu'awiyah, is commissioned to deliver the letter of Yazid ibn Mu'awiyah to Medina. He is an agile and energetic young man who is striving for the truth. In Medina, he realizes that he is the bearer of a letter in which Imam Hussein was ordered to be killed. In Mecca Bukair gets acquainted with the thoughts and line of thought of Imam Hussein (Imam Shiites).

The people Kufa have sent many letters inviting Imam Hussein to Kufa to help them in the uprising against Yazid, the son of Mu'awiyah. Har Ibn Yazid Riahi, along with Bukair and two thousand riders, are ordered by Ubayd Allah ibn Ziyad to go to the caravan of Imam Hussein, which is moving towards Kufa. A small number of Imam Hussein's caravans are besieged by thousands of Yazid soldiers in Karbala. They realized their mistake, they decided to take refuge in the camp of Hussein Ibn Ali and they are martyred along with him.

== Cast ==
- Arash Aasefi
- Bahador Zamani
- Babak Hamidian
- Anoushirvan Arjmand
- David Sterne
- Shaghayegh Farahani
- Farhad Ghaemian
- Zohre Hamidi
- Parviz Pour Hoseini
- Soroush Goudarzi
- Mir Taher Mazloomi
- Hasan Pourshirazi
- Pouria Poursorkh
- Kourosh Zarei
- Mahtab Keramati
- Talhat Hamdi
- Dawood Hussain
- Yusuf Shekarchi
- Foad Ebrahim
- Jamal Soleiman
- Rezvan Aghili
- Leila Bolukat
- Fawaz Sarwar
- Ghader Pezeshki
- Yavar Ahmadifar
- Behnam Tashakkor
- Anoush Moazami
- Ali Abbasi
- Amir Molavi
- Ali Javidfar
- Saeed Alipour
- Hamid Jadidi
- Mohammad Reza Haghgoo
- Babak Vali
- Reza Akbari Arateh
- Ebrahim Soltan Ali
- Khalilullah Khajeh Nezam
- Hossein Madadi
- Pejman Jafari Samarghandi
- Mahmoud Mohkami

== Production ==
The movie was financed by private Iranian and foreign film companies. The film's post-production stage was completed at a British studio(Nolinare), and some scenes of the project were created using 3D computer-generated imagery (CGI) technique. British editor Tariq Anwar was in charge of editing the film.

== See also ==
- List of Islamic films
