= Prophet Joseph (TV series) =

Iranian television series

- International Poster
- Persian: یوسف پیامبر
- Genre: Religious; Historic; Biography
- Created by: Farajollah Salahshoor
- Written by: Farajollah Salahshoor
- Directed by: Farajollah Salahshoor
- Starring: Mostafa Zamani; Katayoun Riahi; Mahmoud Pak Niat; Abbas Amiri Moghaddam; Jafar Dehghan; Jahanbakhsh Soltani; Rahim Norouzi; Mahvash Sabrkon; Elham Hamidi; Parvaneh Massoumi; Leila Bolukat
- Composer: Peyman Yazdanian
- Country of origin: Iran
- Original language: Persian
- No. of seasons: 1
- No. of episodes: 45

Production
- Producer: Rasool Ahadi
- Cinematography: Nasser Kavousi
- Editor: Hossein Zandbaf
- Running time: 45–57 minutes
- Production company: IRIB

Original release
- Network: IRIB TV1
- Release: 27 December 2008 – 1 May 2009

Prophet Joseph (Persian: یوسف پيامبر, romanized: Yūsofe Payāmbar, lit. 'Joseph the Prophet') is a historical drama Iranian television series produced, written, and directed by Farajollah Salahshoor. It first premiered on 27 December 2008, in Iran. It is based on the Islamic account of Joseph from the Quran. The series, dubbed in several languages and aired in over 90 countries, is regarded as the world's most watched Iranian TV series.

== Plot ==
=== Introduction ===
The main theme of the story is based on the account of prophet Joseph in the Quran. The story begins with the memories of Jacob, Joseph's father, and continues with Joseph, who was most loved by his father among his brothers, being thrown into a well in Galilee by his jealous ten brothers. Benjamin was Joseph's brother from the same mother (Rachel); he was still a child and was at home, unaware of the events. Reuben and Levi loved Joseph and did not want to participate in this act, but they were forced to do so under pressure from Judah and the others.

The angel Gabriel appears to Joseph, aged 12, for the first time in the well. Joseph is frightened and speaks to him with a trembling voice. Gabriel greets him and informs him that he is the heir to prophethood, that he will become a prophet after his father. He tells him to prepare for hardship and that he will be sent to a distant land (Ancient Egypt) to guide the people of the world to the right path. Days later, a Hebrew caravan approaches the well to get water. The caravan members cannot see Joseph at the bottom of the dark well, exhausted and too weak from hunger to make a sound, until the angel Gabriel appears to Joseph and asks him to hold onto the water jug. Gabriel told Joseph that they had come to rescue him under God's guidance and that he should not mention himself or his family to them.

A man named Malik ben Zaar, a descendant of Ishmael, was amazed by the beauty of Joseph's face and questioned him. Joseph does not speak as Gabriel commanded. Seeing that Joseph does not speak, he asks him if he knows Hebrew. Joseph finally only gives his name. Malik also asks him whose son he is and which clan he belongs to. Joseph remained silent, but said that someone had thrown him into the well and that he had no family, and he begged for help and wanted to go with them.

The ten brothers, watching from a distance, approach the caravan members and tell them that Joseph is their slave, that he has been lost and fallen into a well, and they demand him back. Malik became suspicious of their speech and actions and asked Joseph if this was true. Joseph remains silent at first and stares at his brothers for a long time. Then he notices his brother Levi, with whom he gets along well, winking at him as if to say "yes." Levi, fearing that Judah would kill Joseph, planned to sell him as a slave to the caravanners. Because he trusted Levi, Joseph said, "Yes, they are my masters." When the caravanners refuse to hand him over, Judas draws his dagger and angrily declares that he will not hesitate to fight them if they do not give him Joseph. At that moment, Levi stops Judah and wants to resolve the issue through dialogue with the caravanners.

Malik tells the Israelites that they cannot handle the armed men in his caravan. But he finally told them he had given up his insistence, even though he believed Joseph was not a slave. Levi puts his plan into action and turns the tables: "Since you want him so badly, we want to sell our slave to you. He doesn't want to come back to us anyway." Malik accepts the offer, and Joseph is sold for exactly 18 dirhams. Judah turned to Joseph one last time and said, "If I ever see you in the land of Canaan again, I will surely kill you." Levi goes to Joseph one last time and says in a low voice, "Don't worry, they're better than us. Go with them. Your life is in danger here. Please forgive me for not being able to do anything."

=== Development ===
After crossing the Egyptian border, Malik ben Zaar asks Joseph, who is stunned, why he is shocked. Joseph says he has never seen such a magnificent and developed place before. Malik said that the Egyptians were polytheistic, did not look kindly upon monotheists, and that he should not speak to them about his faith. Malik sadly puts Joseph, a Canaanite who, like himself, believes in one God, up for sale at an Egyptian slave market. At that moment, the angel Gabriel, in human form, catches the attention of Potiphar (an Egyptian nobleman) and mentions a child slave. Potiphar is very impressed by Joseph's bright eyes and appearance. He buys Joseph as a palace slave for 3,000 dirhams to give to his wife as a gift.

When Potiphar's wife (or Zuleikah) saw 12-year-old Joseph, she felt as if she had known him before and, like everyone else, was very impressed by his good looks. Joseph grew up in the comfort of the palace, being educated, reading books to Potiphar, who could not read, and doing light work. In his early twenties, Joseph becomes a well-equipped and respected palace official. Potiphar's wife, who began to harbor feelings for Joseph, started making increasingly poor decisions because of her love for him. She became addicted to wine and parties, doing everything she could to forget him, but she couldn't forget Joseph, and this did not go unnoticed by the other nobles around her. The other noblewomen reproach Potiphar's wife, saying, "She has fallen in love with her slave. What a great weakness!"

Potiphar's wife, in response to their words, devises a plan to defend herself and showcase Joseph's handsomeness. She organizes a grand banquet in her palace and invites the noblewomen of Egypt. The women are offered fruit, and each is given a knife so they can peel their own fruit. Just then, Potiphar's wife calls Joseph inside. When the women see Joseph, they are amazed by his extraordinary beauty, stunned and almost spellbound. In their astonishment, they cut their hands. The women say, "He is not a man; he must be a beautiful angel." Joseph didn't look anywhere but the road ahead.

After a while, Potiphar's wife succumbs to her love and lust and summons Joseph to her private chamber seven doors away. She tells him that he is her slave and cannot refuse her wishes, and Joseph does not suspect anything at first. Joseph, who never makes eye contact, feels uncomfortable when Potiphar's wife approaches him. Potiphar's wife lowers the veil on her face in front of Joseph and makes her desire for sexual relations clear by saying, "I am ready to give myself to you." Joseph, however, angrily refused and told her that he would not betray her or her husband Potiphar, that it would be adultery. Joseph tells her that he will only carry out her righteous commands. When Potiphar's wife saw that Joseph was unwilling and spoke like this, she slapped him. At that moment, Joseph felt the angel Gabriel calling out to him and delivering a message. Gabriel said to him, "O Prophet of God, Potiphar's wife is a traitor. Do not retaliate against her slap, and flee from this trap of the devil toward the door." Joseph knows the door is locked, but he trusts Gabriel completely. Then the locks on the seven doors begin to open automatically, starting with the first one.

A smile replaced the look of anger on his face, and Joseph began to run away. Seeing this, Potiphar's wife, frightened, began to chase after him. When he reached the last door, Joseph, overcome with excitement, made a mistake and couldn't pull the door toward himself, and Potiphar's wife took advantage of this opportunity and grabbed him by his tunic. Joseph opened the door, but his tunic was torn at the back. As soon as he opened the last door, Potiphar appeared right in front of them. The room fell silent, and finally Potiphar confronted them. While everyone supported Potiphar's wife, Joseph was left alone. Just as Potiphar was about to order his execution, he told Joseph that he would be pardoned if he could find a witness. Joseph, however, is quiet and calm. Finally, he hears the crying baby and senses that it is a miracle from God, and he asks for it as a witness. Potiphar initially thinks this is a joke, but they call the baby without upsetting Joseph. The baby miraculously speaks, saying with poor diction, "God's command is this: If Joseph's tunic is torn from the front, Joseph is guilty. But if it is torn from the back, Joseph is innocent, and Zuleikah is guilty."

== Cast ==
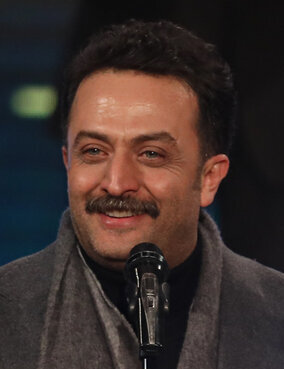
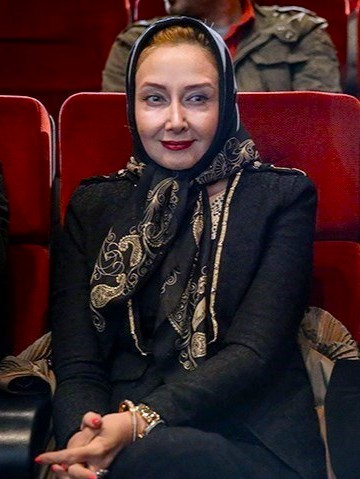
Mostafa Zamani in 2025, who played Joseph, and Katayoun Riahi in 2016, who played Potiphar's wife.

=== Main characters ===
- Mostafa Zamani as Joseph ben Jacob (Egyptian name Jousarseph)
  - Hossein Jafari as young Joseph ben Jacob
- Katayoun Riahi as Potiphar's wife (or Zuleikah)
- Jafar Dehghan as Potiphar

=== Supporting characters ===
- Ardalan Shoja Kaveh as Gabriel
- Mahvash Sabrkan as Karimama, the maid of Zuleikah
- Elham Hamidi as Asenath, wife of Joseph ben Jacob
- Abbas Amiri Moghaddam as Ankh Mahoo
- Jahanbakhsh Soltani as Amenhotep III
- Rahim Norouzi as Akhenaten
- Parvaneh Massoumi as Tiye, wife of Amenhotep III
- Leila Bolukat as Nefertiti, wife of Akhenaten
- Sirous Kahoori-Nejad as Mimisaboo
- Mohammad-Ali Soleimantash as Apophis
- Amir-Hossein Modares as Inaros, winemaker of Amenhotep
- Ali Taleb-Loo as Honifer, chamberlain of Potiphar
- Esmail Soltanian as Kimoni
- Reza Razavi as Horemheb
- Israfil Alamdari as Roodemon
- Reza Agharabi as Paadiyamon
- Parviz Fallahipour as Kidamen
- Mahdi Mansour-Kohi as Hoya
- Mojtaba Bitarafan as Soufer
- Naser Forough as Khoofoo
- Ali Bekaeeian as Apouki
- Panteha Mahdinia as Meriateten
- Jamshid Safari as Falih
- Zahra Mortazavi as Tiamini
- Ala Mohseni as Ninifer Kibta
- Bita Samari as Tama
- Mohammad Poursattar as Khidr
- Sirous Asnaghi as prison guard
- Monouchehr Behrouj as Bintoo
- Farajollah Salahshoor as Azrael

=== Canaanites ===
- Mahmoud Pak Niat as Jacob bin Isaac (or Israel)
- Zahra Saeedi as Faegha bat Isaac
- Kourosh Zarei as Levi ben Jacob
- Davoud Sheikh as Judah ben Jacob
  - Poyan Moghaddam as young Judah ben Jacob
- Mohammad Ahmadi as Simeon ben Jacob
- Zehir Yari as Benjamin ben Jacob
  - Arsalan Ghasemi as young Benjamin ben Jacob
- Nasrin Nakisa ae Dinah bat Jacob
- Fereshteh Sarabandi as Leah bat Laban
- Maryam Bakhshi as Rachel bat Laban
- Soudabeh Alipour as Bilhah
- Mitra Khavajeh-Nian as Zilpah
- Javad Taheri as Malik ben Zaar

== Series description ==
Prophet Joseph is a Persian-language series originally broadcast in 2008, which tells the story of prophet Joseph according to the Islamic tradition. Realistic depictions of everyday life are represented. Each episode of the series begins with the recitation of the first four verses (āyah) of Surah Yusuf.

The 45 episodes of the series are replete with themes on filial love, personal journey through life (within family and on one's own), personal character, submission, prayer, prophethood, idolatry, monotheism, loyalty, betrayal, carnal desires, nature of various kinds of love, separation, abandonment, slavery, social organizations at various levels, nature of political authority, governance, strategy, various ideologies (and their implications), anticipation, and finally, forgiveness and salvation.

The series explores the existential lives of three principal characters (Joseph, Zuleikah, and Jacob) with dozens of other major and minor characters.

The story in the series starts in the south of Babylon, in the second millennium BC, depicting Ya'qub's battle against idolatry (of Ishtar) in Mesopotamia and the miraculous birth of Yusuf.

== Production ==
All episodes are created by Al-Baraka Production, Al-Baraka Media and published by HispanTV on YouTube.

The 16-DVD distribution from Soroush.tv contains a bonus, last DVD describing the making of the movie, including interviews with many of the production crew and a number of assistants to the director.

== Distribution ==
The series, dubbed in English, can be viewed on Iran's iFilm movie network.

The original series, in Persian, can also be obtained in a 16-DVD, two-box set from its official distributor, Soroush Multimedia Company of Iran (Soroush.tv). First 15 DVDs contain 3 episodes each. Last DVD contains 3 episodes on the making of the series.

The series has been fully dubbed and subtitled in several languages, such as English, Arabic, Urdu, Turkish and more.

== Reception and popularity ==
Prophet Joseph has been aired and released in over 90 countries around the world. The series is very popular in the Muslim world, Latin American and African countries. International networks such as iFilm and Al-Kawthar TV have aired the series many times, which have been well received. The series has been aired multiple times during the month of Ramadan in Iran and other countries.

Due to its huge success, the series was later fully dubbed in several languages, such as English, Arabic, Urdu, Turkish and more. The series has also been released on several major YouTube channels with tens of millions of views, which indicates its high international popularity. Prophet Joseph has also been aired in European countries such as Kosovo and Bosnia and Herzegovina. The series is sometimes regarded as the world's most watched Iranian TV series.

== Controversies ==
Some scholars in Egypt's Al Azhar theological school have been reported by a Saudi-owned television station to have advocated the banning of Joseph in Egypt.

The director's daughter who grew up in a religious family criticized her father's work publicly, she believes that promotion of polygamy is planned by IRIB. She said, "… we are not monitoring anyone and everyone has his personal interpretation." She added, "I, as a normal audience, without considering my relation with the director, am very worried about the youths of this country and how the religion is defined for them, worried about the future of this generation, religion, morality and the Quran. What should youths choose?"

Salhashoor commented, "Polygamy had existed in past religions and theological schools. If for some reasons it has been changed is due to the modern world. The prophets and the Prophet's predecessors had second and third wives. It had been in the past and in many Islamic countries, there is still this culture though some Shiites want to revise it. There was polygamy in the past, I could not ignore the fact to please the feminists, again I emphasize that we do not promote polygamy. It is not our intention we just express a historical document."

== See also ==
- Muhammad: The Messenger of God
- Saint Mary
- The Kingdom of Solomon
- The Men of Angelos
- The Messiah
- List of Islamic films
