= Hamidreza Moghaddamfar =

Iranian government employee

Sardar Hamidreza Moghaddamfar
- حمیدرضا مقدّم‌فر
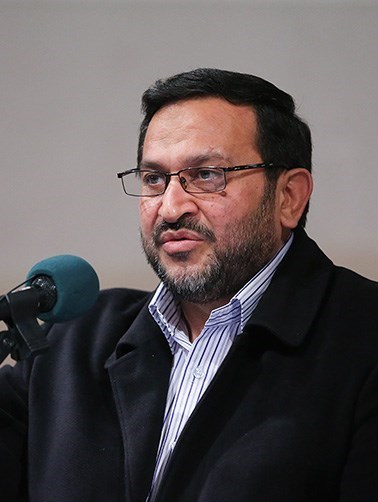
- Born: 1961; Iran
- Military career
- Allegiance: Islamic Republic of Iran
- Branch: Islamic Revolutionary Guard Corps
- Rank: Second brigadier general
- Education: PhD in Strategic Sciences

Hamidreza Moghaddamfar (born 1961) is an Iranian university professor, expert on strategic issues, cultural and media adviser to the commander of the Islamic Revolutionary Guard Corps of Iran, deputy of the Office of Preservation and Publication of Seyyed Ali Khamenei's Works, secretary of the People's Headquarters of Commemoration of Qasem Soleimani and cultural adviser of the Islamic Azad University. He is in charge of publishing and advertising the works of Seyyed Ali Khamenei (the current leader of Iran) to the youth of Europe and North America. He was the CEO of Fars News Agency from 2007 to 2011. Then, he became the cultural and social deputy of the Islamic Revolution Guards Corps (IRGC) and was in this position until September 2014. In 2015, Moghadamfar received the official Iran honorary badge of The Striving in the Field of Culture and Art. He is also a member of the board of trustees of the shrine of Sultan Ali ibn Muhammad Baqir.

Hamidreza Moghaddamfar also has a record of being a member of the Islamic Republican Party, membership in the management and editorial teams of political and cultural publications, membership on the boards of directors of the Samen al-Aimmeh Cultural Institute and the Media Studies and Research Institute, and work as a teacher and administrator in the education system. He has also taught courses on public diplomacy and psychological warfare techniques at the Tolou Cultural Institute.

== Communication with Catherine Perez-Shakdam ==
In March 2022, materials were published on social networks that Hamidreza Moghaddamfar, the deputy of the Office of Preservation and Publication of Seyyed Ali Khamenei's Works, met with Catherine Perez-Shakdam, and connected her to institutions and organizations such as Ali Khamenei's office and Tasnim news agency. The Tasnim news agency published a statement on its website, denying this meeting and calling it a lie by some supporters of Mahmoud Ahmadinejad, the former president of Iran. So Tasnim news agency totally denied the responsibility of Hamidreza Moghaddamfar in Ali Khamenei's office.

The Persian-language section of the Independent newspaper wrote in a report that Catherine Perez-Shakdam, who previously worked in think tanks affiliated with the Israeli government, entered Iran and won the trust of many senior officials and IRGC commanders, so she had close cooperation with the Office of Preservation and Publication of the Works of the Leader of the Islamic Republic of Iran under supervision of Hamidreza Moghaddamfar and Komeil Khojasteh Bagherzadeh, the nephew of Ali Khamenei's wife.

In an interview with the BBC on March 6, 2021, Catherine Shakdam denied having visited to the Supreme Leader's office. She also said that she had no relations with any Iranian officials and, contrary to the claims made, had no access to any documents in Iran. On March 7, 2021, in an interview with ISCA News, Shakdam denied rumors of relationship with some Iranian officials.

== Works ==
Among his works is the book Cognitive Warfare: The Science of Victory in the Battle of the Mind. This book is an account of the science of victory in the battle of minds, presenting literature and knowledge in this emerging field to elites, media professionals, and researchers. It was critically reviewed and discussed at the 36th Tehran International Book Fair. He has also written articles on topics related to cognitive and media warfare. The most important titles among these articles include:

- An Analysis of the Role and Function of Virtual Social Networks in the Events Surrounding the 2009 Iranian Presidential Election.
- Discourse Analysis of ISIS's Media Cognitive Operations (With an Emphasis on Dabiq and Rumiyah).
- Thematic Analysis of the Logic of Resistance and Perseverance in the Thought of the Supreme Leader.

== Violation of the rights of Baha'i citizens ==
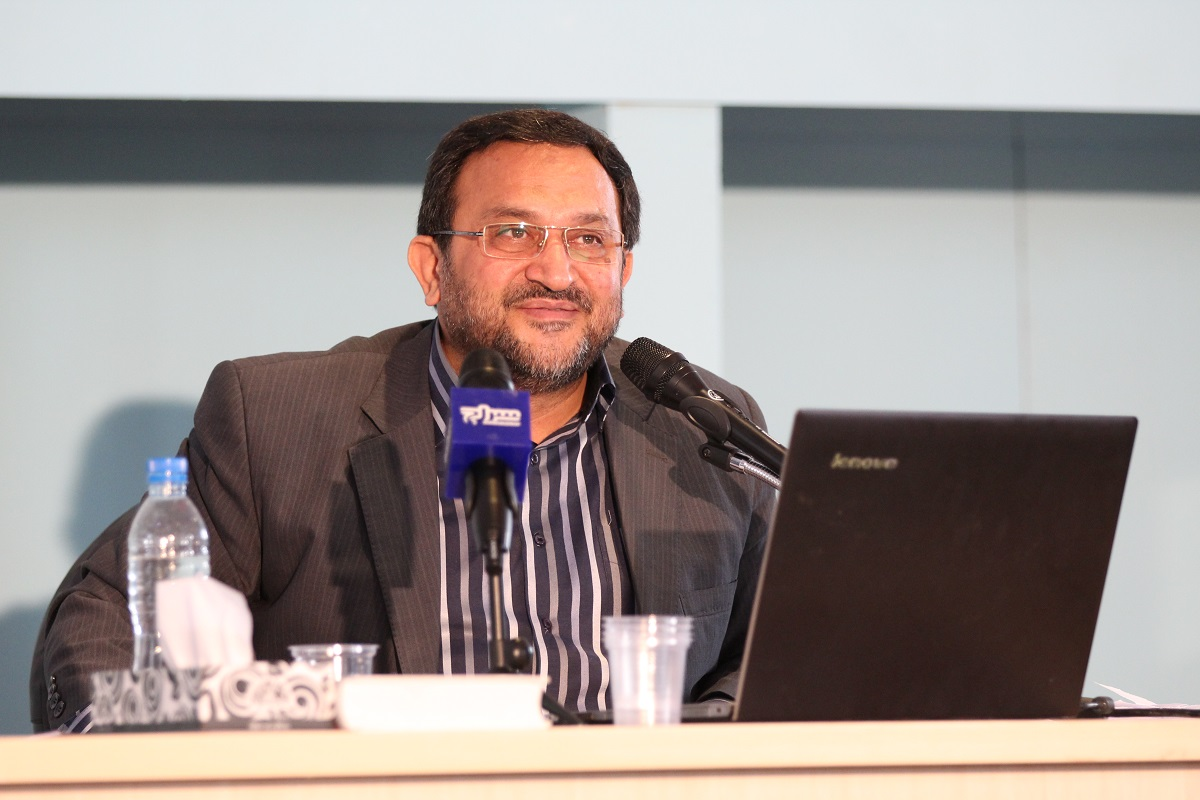
Hamidreza Moghaddamfar, Mashhad, 2015.

Hamidreza Moghaddamfar has been criticized for publishing anti-Bahá'í contents in Fars news agency during his tenure as CEO.

== See also ==
- Nasrollah Khadem
- Ezzatollah Zarghami
- Isa Kalantari
- Mostafa Ajorlu
- Sohrab Gilani

Media offices
Preceded by Mahdi Fazaeli	CEO of Fars News Agency; 2007–2011	Succeeded by Nezamoddin Mousavi
Military offices
Preceded by Hossein Saffar Harandi	Cultural and Social Deputy of the Islamic Revolutionary Guard Corps; 2011–2014	Succeeded by Hossein Nejat
Preceded by ?	Cultural and Media Adviser to the Commander of the Islamic Revolutionary Guard Corps; 2014–2019	Succeeded by ?
