= IRIB Ofogh =

Iranian TV channel

- Country: Iran
- Broadcast area: Asia; Guyana
- Headquarters: Tehran

Programming
- Language: Persian
- Picture format: 16:9 (576i, SDTV) 16:9 (1080p, HDTV)

Ownership
- Owner: IRIB

History
- Launched: 3 June 2014

Links
- Website: www.ofoghtv.com

Availability

Terrestrial
- Jamaran: CH43 UHF Digital

Streaming media
- IRIB Ofogh Live Streaming

IRIB Ofogh (شبكه‌ی افق, Shibkâhi-ye 'Feq, "The Horizon channel" in Persian) is one of 40 national television channels in Iran.

The channel is one of the newer television channels in Iran and was launched on 3 June 2014 as a test airing only in Tehran, and began broadcasting trailers of its programs at the Alvand station, the third transmitter of Tehran, frequency 578, as channel 22. Ofogh TV channel began airing nationally on 24 December 2014 and officially established on 27 February 2015. The channel currently broadcasts 24 hours a day, which includes documentary, history and religious programs.

Sayyed Javad Ramadan Nejad is currently managing the channel. He was appointed to this position in July 2014.

According to Ramadan Nejad the channel director-general, the approach of channel's programs is cultural, artistic and social based on the discourse of the Islamic Revolution.

== Launch ==
The first announcement of the launch of this channel was announced by Seyyed Ezzatollah Zarghami, former head of the Islamic Republic of Iran Broadcasting, on 13 May 2014. And on the eve of Khordad 3, coinciding with the Liberation of Khorramshahr, this channel owned an independent frequency as the twenty-second national media channel and started its experimental broadcast in Tehran and on 27 February 2015 began broadcasting globally.

== Availability ==
=== TV ===
The channel's programs in Iran are available through ground analog transmitters on the UHF band and also Digital receivers. Also, the programs are broadcast via Badr 5 satellite in Iran and some parts of Asia.

=== Internet ===
On the Internet, live watching this channel is possible through the live broadcast website of the Islamic Republic of Iran Broadcasting, the channel's website, as well as other websites such as telewebion and inet.

== Programming ==
Frame from The Logo of "Time" program hosted and produced by Nader Talebzadeh

In the elementary design, it was planned that the programming on this channel will be based on an analytical approach to the issues of the Islamic Revolution. Currently, in addition to analytical programs, the Iranian-Islamic lifestyle and awareness raising in society are also addressed.

Documentaries, combination programs, animations, and clips were the first programs of this channel. Gradually, programs with various social, political, cultural, economic and other issues were added to the channel's broadcasting table.

== Governance and corporate structure ==
IRIB Ofogh is a statutory corporation, independent from direct government intervention, with its activities being overseen by Islamic Republic of Iran Broadcasting. Some media productions in this channel are conducted with the participation of non-governmental organizations and institutions outside the Islamic Republic of Iran Broadcasting.

=== Directorate ===
On 24 June 2014, Sayyed Javad Ramezan nejad, the former director of the documentary department of the IRIB TV4 television channels, was introduced as the director of the Ofogh channel, With the decree of the Vice-President of the Islamic Republic of Iran Broadcasting.

Mohsen Naji is also the director of the television and combined programs of the channel.

=== Thinking council ===
In September 2017, Morteza Mirbagheri, the Vice-President of the Islamic Republic of Iran Broadcasting, appointed members of the thinking Council of the Ofogh channel in separate decrees. Accordingly, Nader Talebzadeh, Majid Shah Hoseini, Hamid Reza Ayatollahi, Hasan Khojest and Mohsen Naji were appointed as members of this council for one year.

== Popular programs ==
Some of the popular programs of this channel as follows:

- Time (عصر): This program is a dialog-driven program designed and produced by Nader Talebzadeh. The program focuses on internal and external day-to-day issues, including political, cultural and social issues, with the participation of experts in domestic and foreign affairs in the events under discussion.
- Elite Land (سرزمین نخبگان): This program addresses the lives of Iranian elites and entrepreneurs both inside and outside the country.
- Seven Days and Seven Hours (هفت روز هفت ساعت): This program is a rally competition With the presence of artists from Iran and Lebanon which has been filmed in both countries. The production of this program, which was shown in Nowruz 1397, has been performed by Saeid Aboutaleb and Mohammad Reza Zaeri.
- Innovators (نوآوران): The program is produced by Meysam Behzadi, which aims at introducing new ideas and industrial and research projects provided by the creative young people of Iran. In each episode, guests come from among the successful Iranian youths who have presented a new idea or design. These designs are in various fields, including transportation, automotive, medicine, car design, industrial design, and so on.

== See also ==
- Owj Arts and Media Organization
