= Mohammad Poursattar =

Iranian actor (1939–2017)

- محمد پورستار
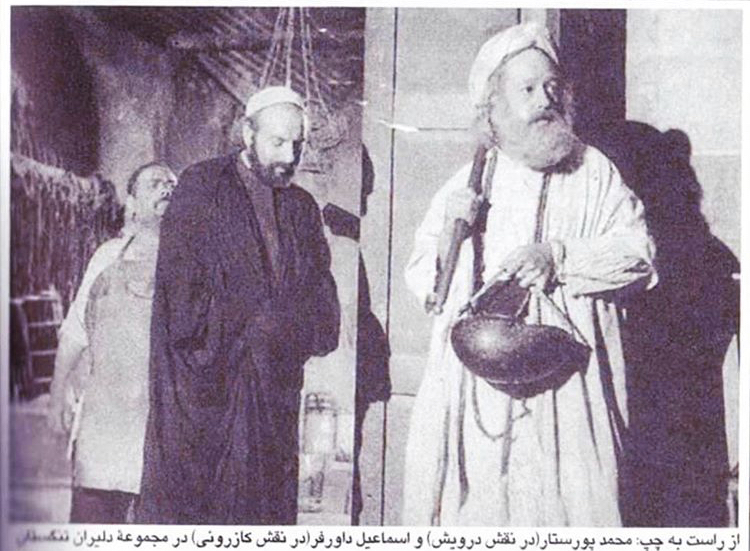
- Born: Mohammad Ghasem Poursattar; 26 June 1939; Ardabil, Iran
- Died: 16 November 2017 (aged 78); Tehran, Iran
- Occupation: actor
- Years active: 1977–2017
- Notable work: Prophet Joseph, Saint Mary

Mohammad Ghasem Poursattar (Persian: محمدقاسم پورستار) was an Iranian actor. He was born in Ardabil, Iran in 1939.

He is best known for his roles in Prophet Joseph, Saint Mary, The Messiah, and The Men of Angelos.

== Filmography ==
Year	Title	Role	Notes
1975	Mir Nassir va ghool-e negoonbakht		
1976	Gharibeh Va Meh		
1977	Kalagh		
1978	Caravans	Mullah 1	
1979	Tcherike-ye Tara		
1980	Aftab neshinha		
1982	Safir		
1985	Milad		
1986	Otoboos		
1986	Kenar-e berke-ha		
1986	Jostojoo dar shahr		
1989	Ersieh		
1992	Mosaferan		
1998	The Men of Angelos		
2000	Saint Mary		
2007	The Messiah		
2008	Prophet Joseph	Prophet Khidr	
