= Yoesuf Foundation =

Dutch civil society organization

The Yoesuf Foundation, later known as the Educational Center for Islam and Social Issues, was a Dutch civil society organization founded by Omar Nahas in 1992. The organization was located in Utrecht and, until 2010, focused on two main issues: young people and sexual diversity.

The foundation was established as a center for study and information about Islam and sexual diversity. The foundation organized lectures, workshops, and conferences. It also contributed to the educational activities of other groups. In 2000, the foundation's educational activities became more formalized through the development of an Islam and sexual diversity training.

In 2004, question time was used to discuss the possibility of discontinuing or letting expire government subsidies for the foundation. In 2005, the foundation was officially renamed the Educational Center for Islam and Social Issues. The foundation was dissolved in 2008 and was succeeded by the Malaica Foundation in December 2009.

The foundation was named after the so-called Yoesuf Method, a model for emancipation where liberation and social justice can be achieved through personal control, integrity, and patience. The method is based on the story of the Yousuf the Prophet (Joseph), who is a prominent character in both the Quran and the Bible.

== See also ==
- LGBT People and Islam

== Bibliography ==
- Nahas, Omar (2004). "Yoesuf: An Islamic Idea with Dutch Quality". Journal of Gay & Lesbian Social Services. 16 (1): 53–64 – via EBSCO.
