= Mostafa Zamani =

Iranian actor (born 1982)

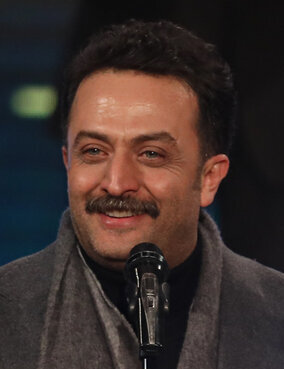
- Zamani in 2025
- Born: 20 June 1982 (age 43); Fereydunkenar, Iran
- Education: Islamic Azad University
- Occupation: Actor
- Years active: 2008–present

Mostafa Zamani (Persian: مصطفی زمانی; 20 June 1982) is an Iranian actor. He has received various accolades, including a Hafez Award and two Iran Cinema Celebration Awards, in addition to nominations for a Crystal Simorgh and an Iran's Film Critics and Writers Association Award.

== Early life ==
His father is from Mazandran, and his mother is from Gilan. He lived in Gilan with his family. When he turned 7, they moved to Fereydunkenar Mazandaran province. He is famous for many roles in Iran's film industry, but his memorable acting as Yousef in the Iranian TV series, "Yousef Nabi" (prophet joseph) was the beginning of his stardom.

== Career ==
Zamani made his series debut in 2008 with Prophet Joseph, and cinematic debut in 2009 with Aul.

He has acted in several series, such as In the Eye of the Storm (2003–2009) and Shahrzad (2015–2018).

Since then, he has appeared in several movies, including Farewell Baghdad (2009), Retribution (2009), Parya's Story (2010), Parinaz (2010), The Final Whistle (2010), A Simple Romance (2011), The Queen (2011), I'm Her Spouse (2011), Berlin 7 (2011), Mirror and Candlestick (2012) and The Exclusive Line (2013).

== Filmography ==
=== Film ===
- Goodbye Baghdad (2009) as Saleh al-Marzouk
- Penalty (2009)
- Paria Story (2009)
- Aal (2010) as Sina
- Booye Gandom (2010) as Inja Tarik Nisht
- Farewell Baghdad (2010) as Saleh al-Marzouk
- Parinaz (2011) as Davud
- Final Whistle (2011)
- Fairy Tale (2011) as Siyavash Masroor
- A Simple Love Story (2011) as Ali
- Queen (2012) as Jamshid
- My Father Love Story (2012)
- I am his wife (2012) as Amir Husayn
- South Street Thief (2012) as Kavih
- Berlin -7 (2012) as Behrouz
- Mirror Shmdvn (2013)
- Twenty Weeks (2013) as Ahmad
- Special Line (2014) as Fereydoun Doulabi
- Small Black Fish (2014) as Maziyar
- A Persian Melody (2015) as Mahmud
- Take Off (2015)
- A Special Day (2016) as Hamid
- Sara and Ayda (2017) as Saeed

=== Web ===
Year	Title	Role	Director	Platform
2015–2018	Shahrzad	Farhad Damavandi	Hassan Fathi	Lotus Play
2019	Blue Whale	Jahangir	Fereydoun Jeyrani	Filimo
2019–2020	Rhino	Navid	Kiarash Asadizadeh	Filimo, Namava

=== Television ===
Year	Title	Role	Director	Notes	Network
2008–2009	Prophet Joseph	Joseph	Farajollah Salahshoor	TV series	IRIB TV1
2009–2010	Dar Chashm-e Baad	Abbas Irani	Masoud Jafari Jozani	TV series	IRIB TV1
2024–2024	Amirli	Dr. Rafed	Ahmad Ibrahim Ahmed	TV series	Filmnet
