= Gospel of Barnabas =

Pseudepigraphic gospel

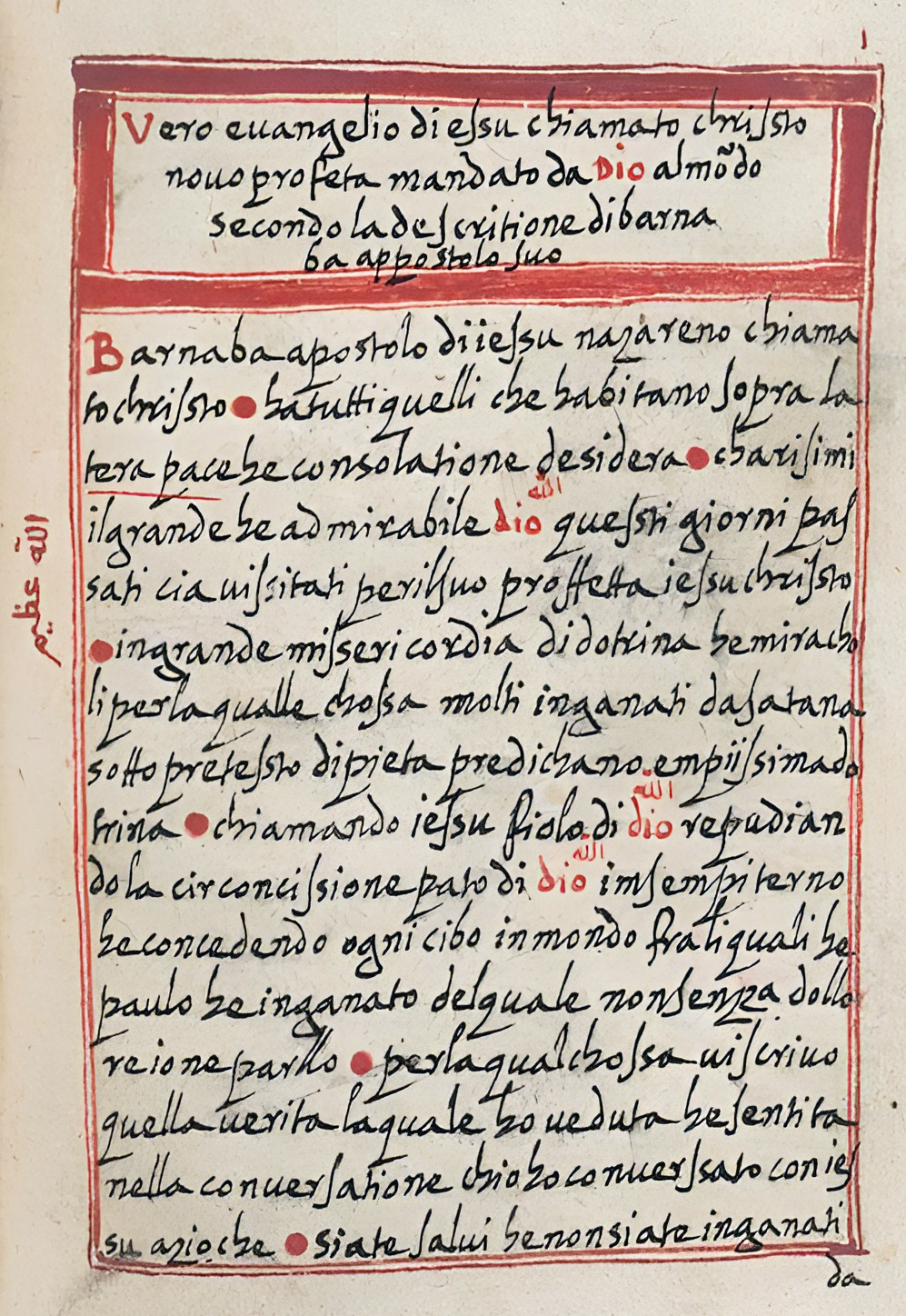
The opening of the Gospel of Barnabas from a 16th-century Italian manuscript with Arabic-language marginalia

The Gospel of Barnabas is a non-canonical, pseudepigraphical gospel, written during the Late Middle Ages and attributed to the early Christian disciple Barnabas, who (in this work) is one of the apostles of Jesus. It is about the same length as the four canonical gospels combined and largely harmonizes stories in the canonical gospels with Islamic elements such as the denial of Jesus' crucifixion. The gospel presents a detailed account of the life of Jesus. It begins with the nativity of Jesus, which includes the annunciation by the archangel Gabriel to Mary which precedes Jesus' birth. The gospel follows his ministry, ending with the message of Jesus to spread his teachings around the world. Judas Iscariot replaced Jesus at the crucifixion.

The gospel survives in three manuscripts (Aramaic, Italian and Spanish), each dated to the Middle Ages. It is separate from the Epistle of Barnabas and the Acts of Barnabas. The earliest known mention of the Gospel of Barnabas has been discovered in a 1634 manuscript by a Morisco which was found in Madrid, and the earliest published reference to it was in the 1715 book Menagiana by the French poet Bernard de la Monnoye.

The gospel's origins and author have been debated, though it is commonly asserted to date to the 13-15th centuries, much too late to have been written by Barnabas (fl. 1st century AD). Many of its teachings are synchronous with those in the Quran and oppose the New Testament.

== Contents ==
The Gospel of Barnabas, as long as the four canonical gospels (Matthew, Mark, Luke, and John) combined, contains 222 chapters and about 75,000 words. Its original title, appearing on the cover of the Italian manuscript, is The True Gospel of Jesus, Called Christ, a New Prophet Sent by God to the World: According to the Description of Barnabas His Apostle; The author, who claims to be the biblical Barnabas, wishes "peace and consolation to all them that dwell upon the earth." Then a critique follows of those (including Paul the Apostle) who are "deceived by Satan into preaching a 'most impious doctrine' by 'calling Jesus son of God, repudiating the circumcision ... and permitting every unclean meat'."

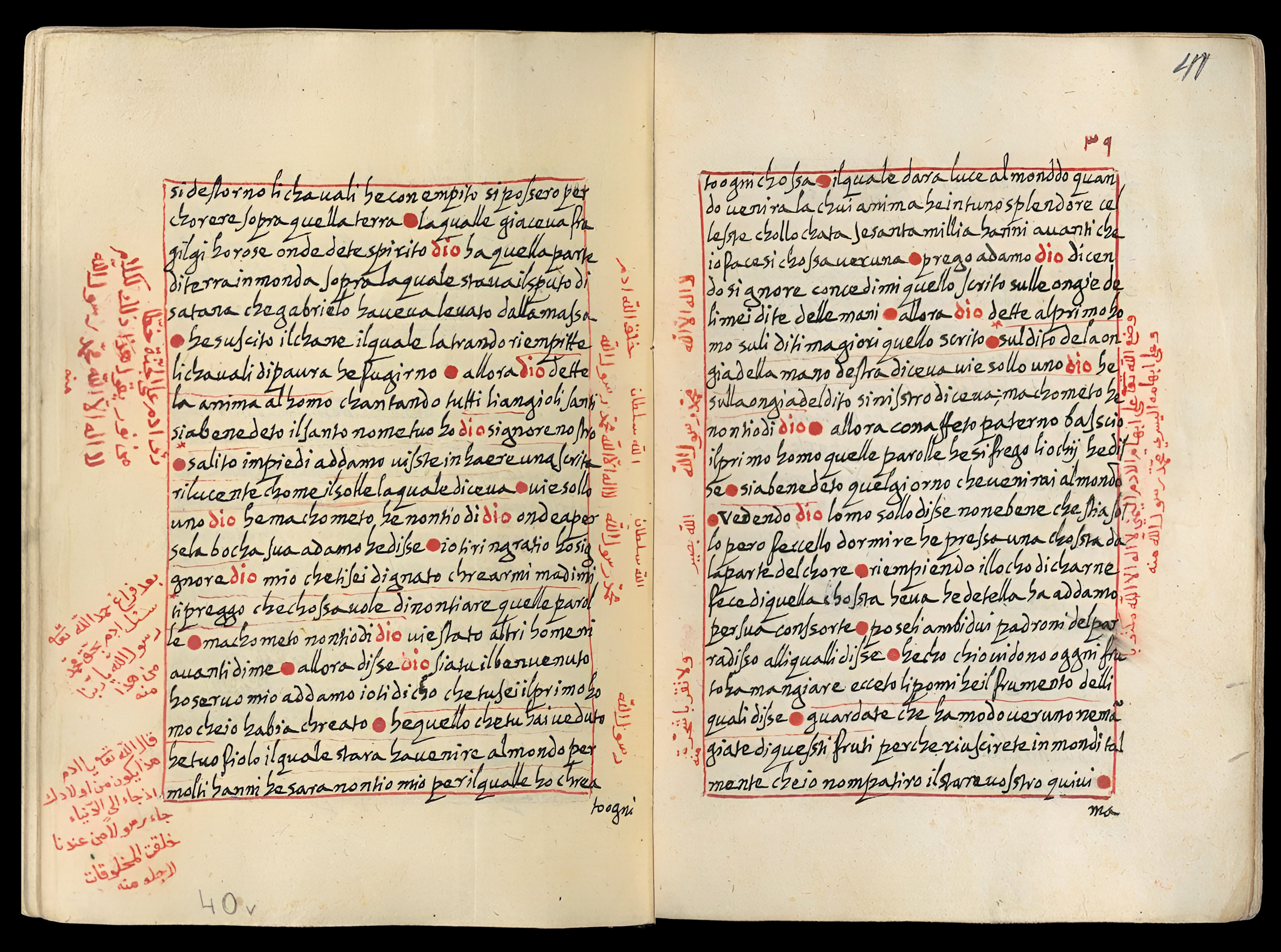
Excerpt from the Gospel of Barnabas in which Jesus foretells of the coming Machometo (Muhammad), a Messenger of God. The Arabic marginalia identifies several sections as the Shahada.

It appears to be a gospel harmony, focusing on the ministry and passion of Jesus. The gospel begins with combined elements of Matthew and Luke, such as the annunciation by the archangel Gabriel to Mary, the Adoration of the Magi, the massacre of the Innocents, the circumcision of Jesus, and his finding in the Temple. It then jumps to Jesus at age 30, when he goes to the Mount of Olives with his mother to gather olives; while praying there, he received the gospel from Gabriel. After this revelation, he tells his mother that he will no longer live with her. Jesus later goes to Jerusalem and begins preaching there. He appoints twelve apostles to accompany him during his ministry; the gospel mentions only ten, including Barnabas. The gospel follows teachings attributed to Jesus about the origins of circumcision, condemnation of the uncircumcised, and the life of Abraham. These include the destruction of his idols and the sacrifice of his son, Ishmael (notably, this upholds the Islamic tradition and contradicts biblical canon which holds Abraham's other son, Isaac, to be the intended sacrifice).

The gospel recounts the transfiguration of Jesus and his proclamation of the prophet, Muhammad, who will come after him. After a number of his parables and teachings it describes his passion, beginning with his confrontations with the scribes and Pharisees about the woman taken in adultery. Mary is told by Gabriel about her son's forthcoming crucifixion and his protection from it; the high priest, Herod Antipas, and Pontius Pilate discuss what to do about him. Jesus and his disciples hide in Nicodemus' house, where they have the Last Supper. Judas Iscariot betrays him for thirty pieces of silver; God then commands Gabriel, Michael, Raphael, and Uriel to save Jesus by taking him "out by the window that looketh toward the South" to the third heaven.

Judas, whose face and speech are changed to resemble those of Jesus, returns to the house while the other disciples are sleeping. He is surprised to know that they think he is Jesus, and he is arrested. Pilate orders his crucifixion, and he is placed in Joseph of Arimathea's tomb. Jesus prays for the ability to see his mother and disciples and tell them what actually happened. He turns to Barnabas, whom he charges with writing about what occurred. The gospel ends with the dispersion of the disciples and another criticism of Paul.

== Textual history ==
The complete silence of the Jewish, Christian, and Muslim traditions is bothersome. If it was only a secondary text of little importance, this silence could be understood. But a fundamental work, which claims to have been written on the direct orders of Jesus, would have to leave some traces in history.

— Jacques Jomier

The Gospel of Barnabas is dated from the 14th to the 17th centuries,^{:57} too late to have been written by the biblical Barnabas (fl. 1st century CE).^{:3} It is one of three extant works bearing his name, along with the Epistle of Barnabas and the Acts of Barnabas.^{:53–60} A "Gospel according to Barnabas" was first mentioned in the sixth-century Gelasian Decree, and was condemned as apocryphal. Another mention of a gospel using his name is in the seventh-century List of the Sixty Books, or the Catalogue of the Sixty Canonical Books. Historians are uncertain whether these refer to this Gospel of Barnabas, since no quotes have been preserved for confirmation. Jomier believes a forger could have taken the title after the publishing of the Gelasian Decree by printing press.

The earliest reference to the gospel may have been in a 1634 letter in the Biblioteca Nacional de España written in Tunisia by Ibrahim al-Taybil (Juan Pérez in Spanish), an Arabic-Spanish translator and author. He referred to the "Gospel of Saint Barnabas, where one can find the light". (Note: Quoted in Spanish: " ... y asi mesmo en Elanjelio de San Barnabé donde de hallara luz.") The first published reference to the gospel was by the French poet Bernard de la Monnoye in his 1715 book, Menagiana. Dutch orientalist Adriaan Reland referred to the gospel's Spanish version in his 1717 De religione Mohamedica (On the Mohammedan Religion). The following year, a reference to the Italian version appeared in the Irish philosopher John Toland's Nazarenus. British Orientalist George Sale cited the Italian and Spanish manuscripts in his 1734 The Preliminary Discourse to the Koran.

=== Manuscripts ===
==== Italian ====
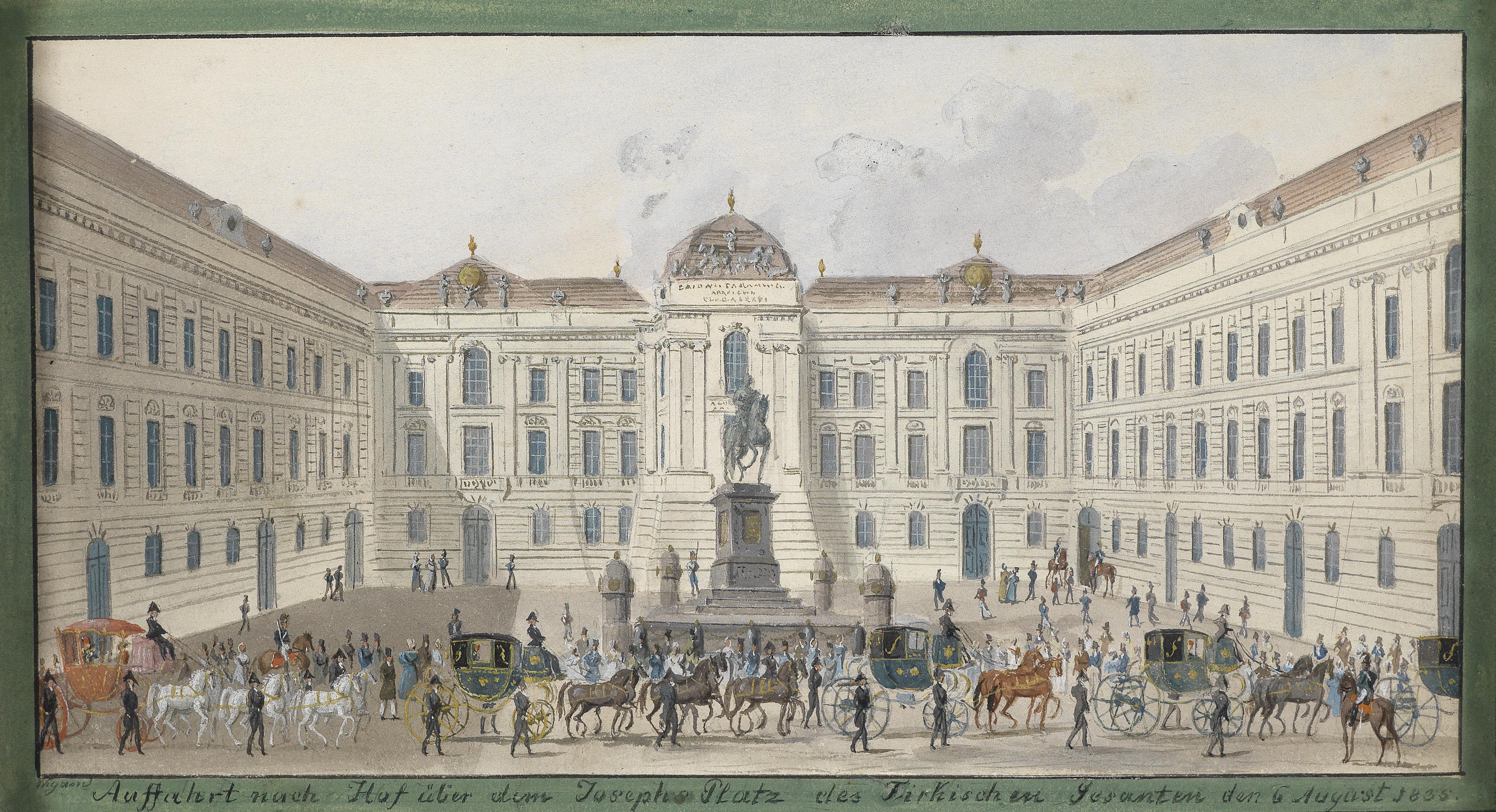
1835 painting of the Austrian National Library, where the Italian manuscript was kept

In Nazarenus, Toland said that he was shown the manuscript he called the "Mahometan Gospel" in 1709 in Amsterdam through an ambassador in the city and the anti-Trinitarian scholar Jean Frederic Cramer (counsellor of Frederick I of Prussia). His description is not detailed, and provides no information about the gospel's general contents. However, he quotes the opening of the gospel ("The true Gospel of Jesus called Christ, a new prophet sent by God to the world, according to the relation of Barnabas his apostle"); a fragment ("The Apostle Barnabas says, 'He gets the worst of it who overcomes in evil contentions; because he thus comes to have the more sin'"), and the ending:

Jesus being gone, the Disciples scattered themselves into many parts of Palestine, and of the rest of the world; and the truth, being hated of Satan, was persecuted by falsehood, as it ever happens. For certain wicked men, under pretence of being Disciples, preached that Jesus was dead, and not risen again: others preached that Jesus was truly dead, and risen again: others preached, and still continued to preach, that Jesus is the Son of God, among which persons Paul has been deceived. We therefore, according to the measure of our knowledge, do preach to those who fear God, to the end that they may be saved at the last day of divine judgment; Amen. The end of the Gospel.

Dated to the end of the sixteenth century, the manuscript was anonymous. Toland observed that it was written on a "Turkish paper delicately gummed and polished", bound in the "Turkish manner", and the fine quality of its ink and orthography led him to assume that it was at least three hundred years old. In the appendix of his book, Toland wrote: "[I]t was an octavo volume six inches long, four broad, and one-and-a-half thick, and containing 229 leaves, each of about eighteen and nineteen lines." The manuscript was obtained by Prince Eugene of Savoy in 1738 through Cramer, who wrote in a dedicatory preface that no Christian had ever been allowed to see it "although they strove with all means at their disposal to find it and take a look at it". It is currently held by the Austrian National Library.

The scholars Lonsdale and Laura Ragg published an English translation of the Italian manuscript by Oxford University Press in 1907. An Arabic translation, at the initiative of the Egyptian scholar Rashid Rida, was published the following year and became popular in the Muslim world; Saʿādeh, a Christian, translated it. Rida began publishing promotional excerpts and information about the Arabic translation before its publication in July 1907 in his magazine, Al-Manār. The Raggs' English translation (without their critical preface) became popular in 1973 in Pakistan, when it was published by M. A. Rahim and promoted as the "true gospel of Jesus" by local newspapers. In Indonesia, it was translated in 1969, 1970, and 1980; the 1970 translation, by Husein bin Abu Bakar Al-Habsyi and Abubakar Basymeleh, was republished with additional footnotes in 1987. Translations in Dutch (1990), German (1994), modern Italian, Persian (1927), Spanish, Turkish, and Urdu (1916) have also been published.

==== Spanish ====
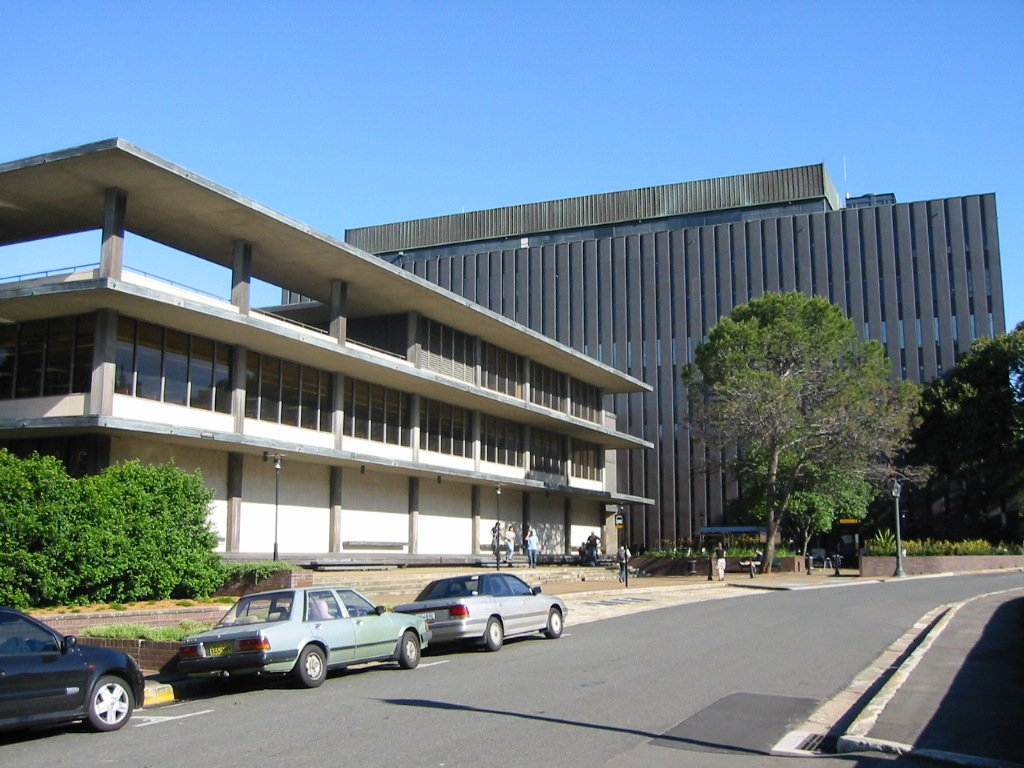
The University of Sydney's Fisher Library, where the Spanish manuscript was discovered

The Spanish manuscript was lost for more than a century; Sale became the only source for a detailed description in his 1734 book, The Koran. He wrote, "The book is a moderate quarto [...] written in a very legible hand, but a little damaged towards the latter end. It contains two hundred and twenty-two chapters of unequal length, and four hundred and twenty pages." Sale saw the manuscript while it was still in the possession of rector George Holme. It later passed to Thomas Monkhouse, a fellow of The Queen's College, Oxford, and was seen by the Reverend Joseph White. White quoted several extracts from the English translation in a 1784 lecture, before the gospel's whereabouts became unknown.

A Spanish Gospel of Barnabas was found at the University of Sydney's Fisher Library, among the books of Australian politician Charles Nicholson, in 1976. A copy of Sale's manuscript, made between 1736 and 1745, (Note: The transcriber (probably English), who identified themselves as "M. Hone", wrote: "Transcribed from ms [manuscript] in possession of Revd Mr. Edm. Callamy who bought it at the Decease of Mr. George Sale 17[36] and now gave me at the Decease of Mr. John Nickolls 1745.") is incomplete and has differences from the Italian manuscript; the subheaders of chapters 1–27 are missing. Only the first third of chapter 120 exists, ending on page 116 with a note: "Cap. 121 to 200 wanting". The next page continues with chapter 200, chapter 199 in the Italian manuscript (a discrepancy which continues until chapter 222 in the Spanish manuscript, 221 in the Italian). The Spanish 218th chapter has different lines, and the subheader "En que se cuenta la passion de Judas Traydor" ("In which the passion of Judas the Betrayer is recounted"). The Italian chapter 222 is missing from the Spanish manuscript. J. E. Fletcher, who discovered the latter, published his findings in the October 1976 issue of Novum Testamentum.

Scholars note parallels in the manuscript to a series of Morisco forgeries (collectively known as the Lead Books of Sacromonte), which may date it to the 16th century. Claiming to be a translation of an Italian manuscript – probably not the extant one – it opens with a prologue by Fra Marino (likely a pseudonym). According to Fra Marino, he first encountered writings by the Church Father Irenaeus which criticized Paul and referred to the Gospel of Barnabas. While with his friend Pope Sixtus V at a Vatican City library, he then found a copy of the Gospel of Barnabas and converted to Islam after reading it. Mustafa de Aranda, an Aragonese Muslim who lived in Istanbul (then Constantinople), is identified in the translator's note as the translator of the Italian manuscript into Spanish. Nothing further is known about this, and none of Irenaeus' writings mentioned the gospel. Through the University of Granada, Luis Bernabé Pons published the incomplete Spanish manuscript (with missing parts derived from the Italian manuscript) in a 1998 book entitled El texto morisco del Evangelio de San Bernabé (The Moorish Text of the Gospel of Saint Barnabas).

==== Syriac ====
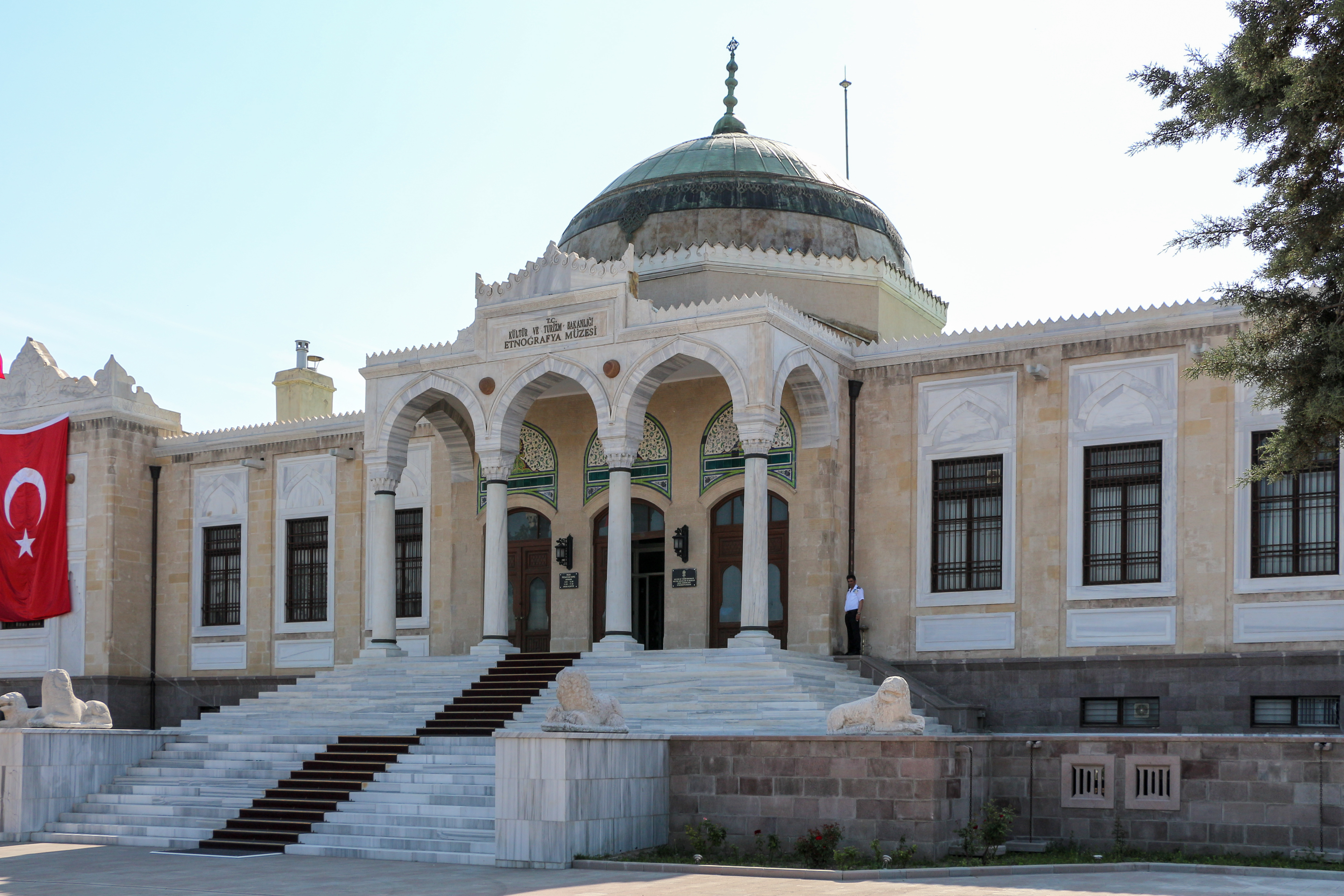
The Ethnography Museum of Ankara, where a Syriac copy is being held

In 1985, Turkish media reported that an alleged Syriac-language copy of the Gospel of Barnabas had been found in the city of Hakkâri.

A Syriac manuscript of the Gospel of Barnabas was reportedly found in Cyprus in 2000 in a police anti-smuggling operation, and was held in a police depository. In February 2012, the Turkish Ministry of Culture and Tourism confirmed the 52-page Gospel of Barnabas had been deposited at the Ethnography Museum of Ankara. The World Council of Arameans requested ownership of the manuscript.

Photographs of a cover page were widely published, on which can be read an inscription in a neo-Aramaic hand: "In the name of our Lord, this book is written on the hands of the monks of the high monastery in Nineveh, in the 1,500th year of our Lord."

== Authorship and origins ==
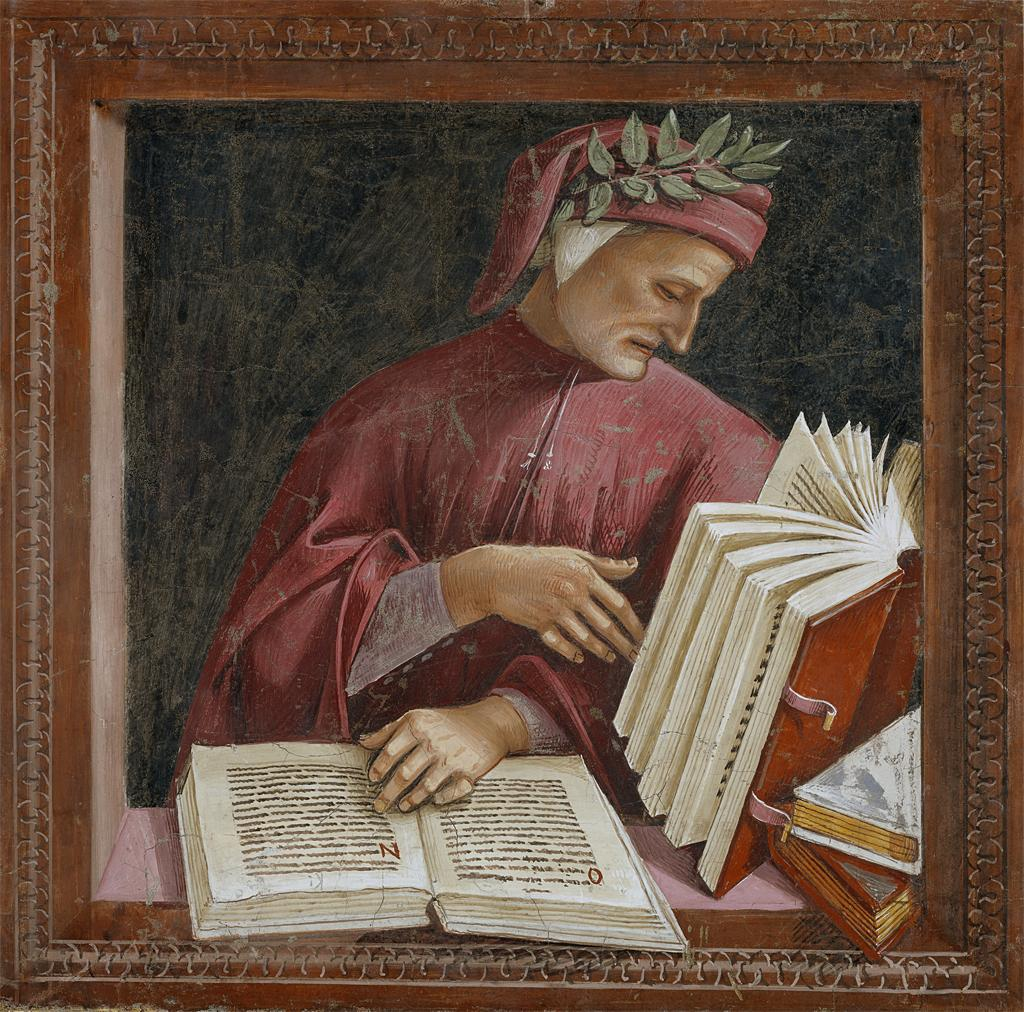
Some researchers believe that phrases in Barnabas resemble those used by Dante Alighieri.

The Gospel of Barnabas is probably of late-medieval or later origin, since its author is familiar with works written during this period. Nothing is known about its author, however; many hypotheses have been made, but none are conclusive. Researchers who argue for an Italian origin note its similarities to Dante Alighieri's early-14th-century Divine Comedy. Barnabas says that God made nine heavens, in contrast to the Quran's seven, and uses Dante's catchphrase "Dei falsi e bugiardi" ("false and lying gods") three times. Others also find textual similarities between passages in the gospel and late-medieval vernacular harmonies of the canonical gospels.

The gospel has been hypothesized as having Spanish origins or connections. Spanish academic Mikel de Epalza suggested that the Italian manuscript was created by a Spaniard, with elements of Tuscan and Venetian dialects. Epalza said that the author may have been a Spanish student at the University of Bologna (where the dialects were spoken), since Spaniards commonly studied there during the Middle Ages. Analysis indicates linguistic errors in the manuscript, demonstrating the author's unfamiliarity with Italian. (Note: In chapters 3 and 4, for instance, the phrase "immense shine" were translated into three different spellings: "immenso splondere", "imenso splondere", and "inmenso splondere"; instead of anno (year), this manuscript uses hanno.) Author David Fox wrote about Arabic gospel forgeries written in 1588 by two Moriscos in Granada, theorizing that the Gospel of Barnabas may have been another Morisco forgery.

This theory also leads other researchers to advocate a Spanish priority; they believe that the preface in the Spanish manuscript was a fabrication, a "mere literary device". According to Luis Bernabé Pons, the Lead Books of Sacromonte (found in Granada in 1595) were meant to begin the Gospel of Barnabas. The books, written on round lead leaves, deal with the arrival of James the Great and his disciples in Spain. The books say that James was tasked to hide them in Spain, where a priest (helped by Arabians) would discover them. The "great conqueror king of the Arab kings" – probably referring to the Ottoman Empire – later summoned a council in Cyprus, the traditional site of Barnabas' martyrdom. Pons said that Barnabas' name was used because the Lead Books were "suspected and scrutinized" for Islamic/Jewish content, including the Shahada. The plan failed when the Moriscos were expelled between 1609 and 1614.

It was done by somebody, whether a priest, secular, monk or layman, who had an amazing knowledge of the Latin Bible [...] And like Dante, he was particularly familiar with the Psalter. It was the work of somebody whose knowledge of the Christian Scriptures was exceeding his familiarity with the Islamic religious Scriptures. It was more probable; therefore, that he was a convert from Christianity.

— Lonsdale and Laura Ragg, on the gospel's origins

A comparison of the Italian and Spanish texts indicates several places where the Spanish reading appears secondary; words or phrases necessary for meaning are missing from the Spanish text, but appear in the Italian. Biblical scholar Jan Joosten hypothesized a lost Italian original, which he dated to the mid-14th century and may have been used by both manuscripts. Joosten noted that the Spanish text adapts a number of "Italianisms". The Italian text uses the conjunction pero ("therefore"), and the Spanish text reads pero ("however"); the Italian word is the one required in the context. Only the Spanish reading makes sense in several passages, however, and many features of the Italian text are not found in the Spanish.

Jan Slomp wrote in Islamochristiana that the names in the Spanish manuscript (Fra Marino and Mustafa de Aranda) may refer to the same person, since converts at the time often changed their names. Slomp said that they may have been a Jew, with the name "Fra Marino" based on marrano: a derisive term for conversos (Jewish converts to Catholicism). Other theories about an Arabic original are based on Sale's description of an Arabic gospel popular among Muslims, attributed to Barnabas, which he had never seen. The Raggs assumed that Sale misunderstood Toland's challenge to Muslims in Nazarenus to produce a gospel similar to Barnabas'. (Note: Toland wrote, "You are particularly desired to enquire after the Gospel of Barnabas: for such a book is in the possession of his most serene Highness Prince Eugene of Savoy, and was undoubtedly written [...] by a profest Mahometan; as the Summaries of the Chapters, and the Arabic Notes on the margin of the Italian Translation, are the work of a zealous adversary to Christianity. And if you should happen to meet with this book, you are diligently to enquire, whether they acknowledge it as divine, whether it be the onely Gospel they admit? or, in case they have any more of this kind, whicli are Apocryphal, and which authentic, in their account?") No further proof for it exists, and Sale's conjecture has been generally dismissed by researchers.

== Analysis ==
=== Anachronisms and factual errors ===
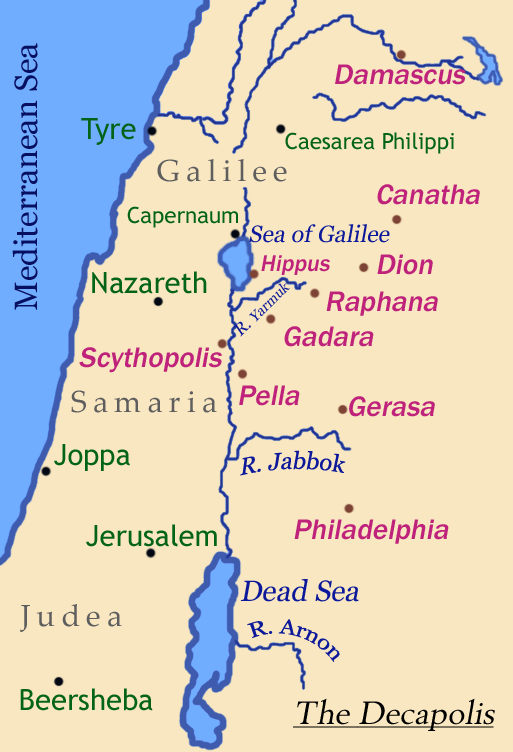
Map of the Decapolis

The Gospel of Barnabas contains historic anachronisms, as well as geographical and other factual errors. According to the Raggs, they prove its medieval origins and the author's ignorance of first-century Judea. Anachronisms include:

- In chapter three, Pontius Pilate is said to have governed Judea and Annas and Caiaphas were the high priests when Jesus was born (c. 4 BC). Annas became high priest in AD 6, and his son-in-law Caiaphas succeeded him in AD 18. Pilate did not become procurator until AD 26–27.
- In chapter 15, during the first year of Jesus' ministry, it is said that the "feast of Tabernacles was near". In chapter 30, the author writes of the Senofegia which would also take place that year; Tabernacles and Senofegia are synonymous.
- In chapters 20–21, it is said that Jesus and his disciples arrived in Nazareth after embarking on the Sea of Galilee and "went up to Capernaum"; Capernaum was on the shore, and Nazareth more than 15 miles inland.
- In chapters 42 and 96, Jesus said: "I am not the Messiah". The authors appear to not realise that the Greek Christ and the Hebrew Messiah are synonymous; both mean "the anointed one".
- In chapter 63, Nineveh is described as near the Mediterranean Sea; it was 400 miles (640 km) away, in Mesopotamia (modern Iraq).
- In chapter 65, Jesus is said to go to the "Probatica" pool. According to the author, it is so called "because the angel of God every day troubled the water, and whosoever first entered the water after its movement was cured of every kind of infirmity"; probatikḗ, Greek for the Aramaic bethesda, means "of the sheep".
- In chapter 82, it is said that a jubilee occurs every hundred years; the Jewish jubilee is every fifty years. Pope Boniface VIII proclaimed 1300 as the first Christian jubilee, and the next jubilee would take place a hundred years later.
- In chapter 99, Tyre is said to be near the Jordan River; in reality, it is more than 30 miles (48 km) away.
- In chapter 144, the word Pharisee is said to mean "seeking God"; derived from the Hebrew, it means "separated". In the next chapter, it is said that the Pharisees began when the Canaanites had power in Judea; this would have been in the 11th century BC or earlier; the Pharisees, a Jewish religious movement, began no earlier than the second century BC.
- In chapter 152, it is said that wine barrels were in use during Jesus' time; large jars (pithoi) were used then to store wine.
- In chapters 214 and 217, the "pagan" Herod Antipas is said to rule Jerusalem and Judea; his authority was in Galilee, and he followed the Jewish religion.

=== Anti-Pauline tone ===
Scholarly analysis indicates that the Gospel of Barnabas had an anti-Pauline tone, most clearly shown in its prologue and epilogue; these depict Paul preaching a perverted version of Jesus' teachings, and as "deceived" in thinking that Jesus was God (or the Son of God). In his Connecting with Muslims: A Guide to Communicating Effectively (2014), Lebanese author and Christian missionary Fouad Masri called the gospel anachronistic; in the Acts of the Apostles, Barnabas was Paul's best friend and not an enemy. For the Journal of Higher Criticism, R. Blackhirst wrote that the Epistle to the Galatians account of conflict between Paul and Barnabas may have been why the gospel's author attributed it to Barnabas.

=== Parallels with the Quran ===
==== Crucifixion of Jesus ====
In the Gospel of Barnabas, Jesus was not crucified. Judas Iscariot (whose face was made to resemble his) replaced him on the cross, and Jesus was raised into heaven by God. This agrees with the mainstream interpretations of An-Nisa 157–158, affirming that Jesus was not crucified but instead his lookalike was:

And because of their saying: We slew the Messiah, Jesus son of Mary, Allah's messenger - they slew him not nor crucified him, but it appeared so unto them; and lo! those who disagree concerning it are in doubt thereof; they have no knowledge thereof save pursuit of a conjecture; they slew him not for certain. But Allah took him up unto Himself. Allah was ever Mighty, Wise. — Qur'ān 4:157-158

In its narrative of Jesus' crucifixion, the gospel is thought to be influenced by (or adopt) docetism: a heterodox doctrine that Jesus' human form was an illusion. David Sox wrote that the Gospel of Barnabas' portrayal of Judas Iscariot is more sympathetic than that in the canonical gospels, where he is cast as a villainous betrayer; in Christian tradition, his name is synonymous with one who deceives under the guise of friendship. The Raggs said that since the alleged substitution in the Quran is unnamed and unexplained, the author of the gospel attempted to fill this void.

Ghulam Murtaza Azad described the gospel as a medieval forgery in Islamic Studies, but found its narrative more reasonable than that of the canonical gospels: "A man who is not religious minded can hardly believe that a person who wrought such great miracles could not save himself from humiliation and cross. The Christians say that he was crucified in order to save mankind from their sins. This explanation of crucifixion is strange and difficult to understand. And stranger than that is that the traitor was saved and the master was hanged." Although it would appear that the canonical gospels do not portray Judas as being saved. In his Understand My Muslim People (2004), Abraham Sarker wrote that the narrative is popular in Quranic exegesis.

==== Prediction of Muhammad ====
In accordance with As-Saff 6, Muslims believe that Jesus was the forerunner of Muhammad and predicted Muhammad's coming:

And ˹remember˺ when Jesus, son of Mary, said, “O children of Israel! I am truly Allah’s messenger to you, confirming the Torah which came before me, and giving good news of a messenger after me whose name will be Aḥmad.” Yet when the Prophet came to them with clear proofs, they said, “This is pure magic.”
—Qur'ān 61:6

In Islam, the word ahmad (Arabic for "the praised one") refers to Muhammad. The Gospel of Barnabas contains a number of sayings attributed to Jesus, who Muslims believe predicted the coming of Muhammad. The gospel places Jesus as being a forerunner for Muhammad.

==== Nontrinitarianism ====
According to the Nicene Creed, the concept of the Trinity means that God is one and also exists consubstantially as three persons (Father, Son, and Holy Spirit); Jesus is the Son. Trinitarianism is rejected by Unitarian Christians, and by Islam, which believes in the concept of tawhid (indivisible oneness) and considers the Trinity a shirk equating God with his creation. Muslims believe that, like other Islamic prophets, Jesus was human and never claimed to be God. The Gospel of Barnabas contains statements, attributed to Jesus, in which he denies being the Son of God. The gospel says that Jesus appeared to be crucified as punishment for people who claimed his divinity, and Muhammad was sent later to expose the transgressions by the Christians for worshipping Jesus.

== Perspectives ==
=== Christian ===
The Gospel of Barnabas was not accepted by Christians, who consider it inferior to the four canonical gospels and a forgery. According to Togardo Siburian of the Bandung Theological Seminary, it is often used "by [Muslim] propagandists in a guerrilla manner to prey on Christians with weak theological commitments. This is what is said to be the efficacy of the book, as new material for the stealth 'Islamization' or ‘Judaisation’ of Christian churches today." Jan Joosten called it a "hotchpotch of Christian, Jewish, and Muslim materials". J. N. J. Kritzinger wrote for Religion in Southern Africa that the gospel is an obstacle to Christian–Muslim interfaith dialogue, and neither side should use it to discredit the other's religion. Christian theologian Norman Geisler criticised Muslims who use it to validate their arguments:

It is not surprising that Muslim apologists appeal to the Gospel of Barnabas in that it supports a central Islamist teaching in contrast to the New Testament. It claims that Jesus did not die on the cross [...] Rather, it argues that Judas Iscariot died in Jesus' stead [...] having been substituted for him at the last minute. This view has been adopted by many Muslims, since the vast majority of them believe that someone else was substituted on the cross for Jesus.

Jan Slomp wrote that it was difficult to understand the absence of mentions of the gospel in early Islamic writings if it had existed since antiquity, a view shared by A. H. Mathias Zahniser in his The Mission and Death of Jesus in Islam and Christianity (2017). Slomp called it a "conscious attempt at imitating a Diatessaron".^{:35} Egyptian Catholic philosopher Georges Chehata Anawati wrote for the 1971 Encyclopaedia of Islam, "The appearance of a forgery entitled the Gospel of Barnabas put into the hands of the Muslim polemicists [...] a new weapon whose effects on the ordinary public, and even on some insufficiently informed members of universities are felt even today." A critical book, William F. Campbell's The Gospel of Barnabas: Its True Value, was published in 1989.

=== Islamic ===
==== Acceptance ====
Some have identified it as the Injil, one of four Islamic holy books sent by God. (Note: It has been claimed that nothing is known about the characteristics of the Injil. The non-Muslim writer William Campbell says that Muslim scholars believe it refers to the four canonical gospels,. The vast majority of Muslim scholars hold to the view that it is a single gospel revealed by God to Jesus and that only fragments of this text survive in the Christian canonical gospels. Cases have been made by several Muslim scholars, including Ahmed Deedat, for connecting the Injil with the Gospel of Barnabas.) About the gospel's generally-positive reception in the Muslim world, Scottish orientalist W. Montgomery Watt said that it is not uncommon for Muslims to be persuaded to believe in it without question; some are unaware of the scholarly consensus that it is a forgery. According to German scholar Christine Schirrmacher, Muslim positivity about the gospel is based on its claim of being written by an eyewitness and disagreement (favoured by Islam) with mainstream Christian doctrines.

Among Muslims, the gospel was first cited by Indian scholar Rahmatullah Kairanawi in his Ijaz-i Isawi (1853). It became more popular after the 1908 publication of Rashid Rida's Arabic translation. According to Pakistani scholar Abul A'la Maududi, the Gospel of Barnabas is "more genuine than the four canonical gospels". Rida agreed that it was "superior" to the canonical gospels in its "divine knowledge, glorification of the Creator, and knowledge of ethics, manners and values". During a 1940 course at Al-Azhar University, Egyptian intellectual Muhammad Abu Zahra challenged Christians to study and refute the gospel: "The most significant service to the religions and to humanity would be that the church take the trouble to study the gospel according to Barnabas and refute it and to bring us the proofs on which this refutation is based."

At a 1976 Christian–Muslim dialogue in Libya, each Muslim delegate first received copies of the Gospel of Barnabas and the Quran; the gospel was withdrawn after a protest by the Vatican. Rahim published Jesus: A Prophet of Islam, defending the gospel, in 1979. M. A. Yusseff wrote in The Dead Sea Scrolls, The Gospel of Barnabas, and the New Testament (1985) that no other gospels can equal its authenticity. A 2007 Iranian film, The Messiah, was apparently based on the gospel and was the first film to depict Jesus from Christian and Islamic perspectives. It had a mixed critical response, praised for "generating interfaith dialogue" but criticised for its controversial account of the crucifixion. Director Nader Talebzadeh said, "I pray for Christians. They've been misled. They will realize one day the true story."

==== Rejection ====
The Gospel of Barnabas is criticized by Muslim scholars, who reject it partially or completely. According to American scholar Amina Inloes, the many differences between the gospel and the Quran dilute its importance. In the January 1977 issue of the Islamic World League journal, Syrian writer Yahya al-Hashimi called it a polemic by a Jew to generate hostility between Christians and Muslims. Al-Hashimi said that there was no need to use apocryphal gospels to prove that Muhammad was a prophet, because he believed Muhammad had been foretold by Jesus as the Paraclete in the Gospel of John. Egyptian literary critic Abbas Mahmoud al-Aqqad cited several reasons to reject the gospel, including the use of Andalusi Arabic phrases and teachings which conflict with the Quran.

== See also ==
- Toledot Yeshu
- Acts of Barnabas
- Epistle of Barnabas
