= Jafar Dehghan =

Iranian actor (born 1960)

Jafar Dehghan جعفر دهقان
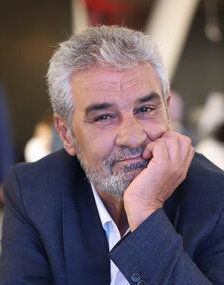
- Jafar Dehghan in 2025
- Born: 10 April 1960 (age 65); Tehran, Iran
- Education: Islamic Azad University
- Occupations: Actor, Art Director
- Years active: 1995– Present

Jafar Dehghan (Persian:جعفر دھقان ) is an Iranian actor and art director. He is known for his roles in Yousuf e Payambar (2008)/ Prophet Joseph, Crisis/ Bohran (1987), The Attack on H3 (1995) , The Men of Angelos (1997), Saint Mary (2000), and the Iranian television series Mokhtarnameh (2010-2011).
