= Sohrab Gilani =

Iranian politician

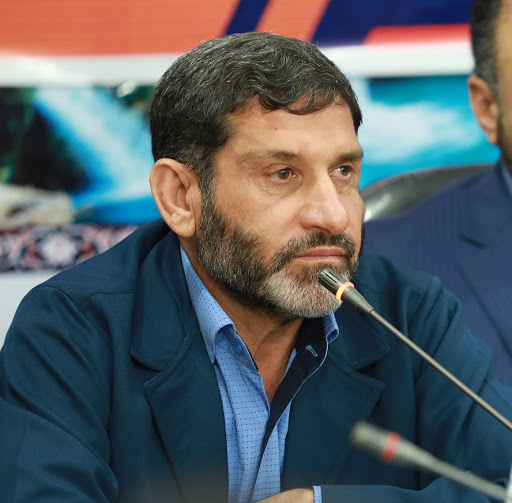

Representative of the 11th term of the Islamic Consultative Assembly
- Constituency: Shushtar and Gotvand, Khuzestan Province

Personal details
- Born: Sohrab Gilani; 1967 (age 58–59) Shushtar, Khuzestan Province
- Occupation: Member of the 11th Islamic Consultative Assembly
- Known for: A representative in Majles

Sohrab Gilani (Persian: سحراب گیلانی; born 1960 in Shushtar, Khuzestan province) is a former principlist representative of Shushtar and Gotvand in the Islamic Consultative Assembly (the Parliament of Iran) who was elected at the 11th Majles elections on 21 February 2020 and captured approximately 32,000 votes.

Gilani who is a Twelver Shia Muslim, is considered as one of the 18 representatives of Khuzestan provinces at the 11th "Islamic Consultative Assembly" (11th parliament).

Sohrab-Gilani's electoral rivals (in the 11th parliament elections) were: Seyyed Mohammad Sadat Ebrahimi 29910 votes, Ali Bani Agbeh 23280 votes, Abbas Nouri 10909 votes, Ismail Taghipour 635 votes and Nader Mohammad Shoushtari 317 votes.

== See also ==
- List of Iran's parliament representatives (11th term)
- Hamidreza Moghaddamfar
