= University of Sydney Library =

Australian library system

Coordinates: 33°53′12″S 151°11′25″E

The University of Sydney Library is the library system of the University of Sydney. It comprises eight library locations and seven study spaces across several campuses of the university. Its largest library, Fisher Library, is named after Thomas Fisher, an early benefactor.

Among the collection are many rare items such as one of the two extant copies of the Gospel of Barnabas, and an annotated first edition of Philosophiae Naturalis Principia Mathematica by Sir Isaac Newton. In 2017, a member of staff discovered an original Giorgione sketch in Rare Books and Special Collections with a definitive date and cause of death for Giorgione, information that had been lost for over 500 years in a 1497 edition of Dante Alighieri's Divine Comedy.

== A brief history of the Library ==
In 1885, the university received thirty thousand pounds from the estate of the late Thomas Fisher, retired bootmaker and property investor, to be used "in establishing and maintaining a library".

There was a difference of opinion in the university on how to spend the bequest. The Chancellor thought the fund should be used for a building and to contribute to the salary of a Librarian, but the Vice Chancellor and Library Committee preferred to buy books. In 1887 a compromise was reached. £20,000 plus accumulated interest was set aside for a building fund with the hope that the government would provide matching funds and £10,000 was directed to an endowment for books.

After many reversals and delays the New South Wales government agreed to fund the full cost of a new library building and the Fisher capital could be preserved as an endowed book fund. Plans were drawn up for the library by the Government Architect, Walter Vernon, and construction took eight years.

The first Fisher Library opened in 1909. The reading room was in the Gothic tradition with a magnificent cedar roof but the adjoining multi-tier book stack was of advanced design, including two electric book lifts. The reading room is now the MacLaurin Hall.

== Fisher Library ==
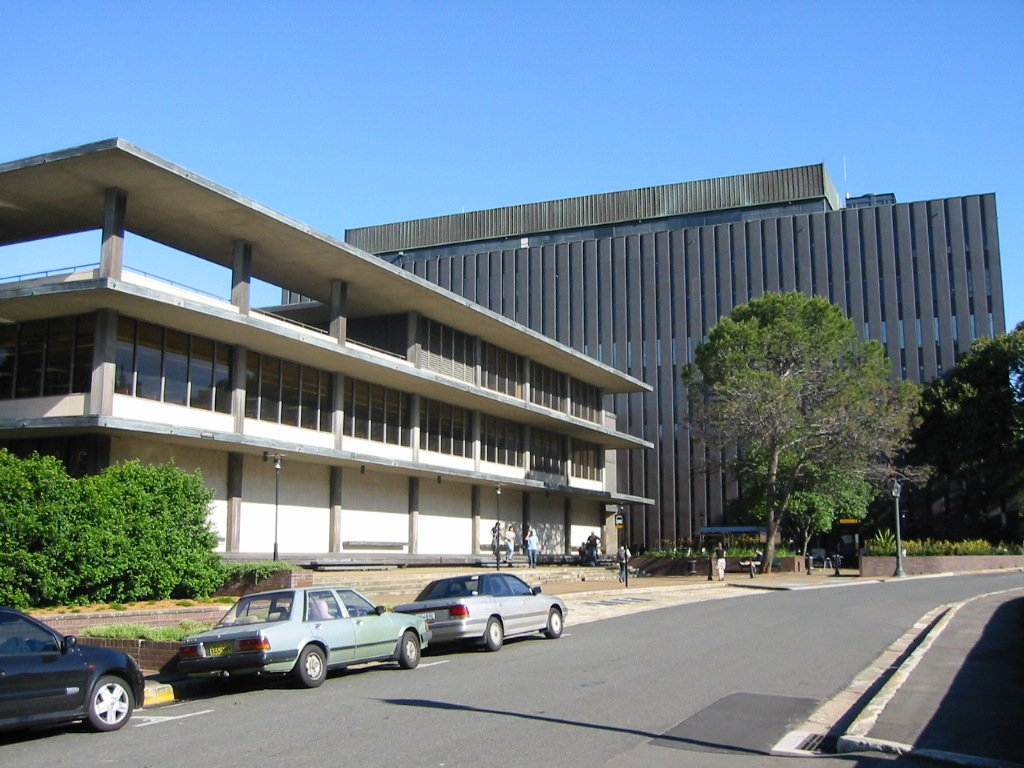
Fisher Library, University of Sydney. To the left of the image is Fisher North, and to the right is Fisher South.

Fisher Library is the largest and first branch of the library system, located on Eastern Avenue on the Camperdown Campus, adjacent to Victoria Park. The Fisher Library is for University of Sydney students and staff. Its collection focuses on humanities, social science and commercial disciplines. The original Fisher Library, in the 19th century, was housed in the Quadrangle in what is presently the Senate Room. A purpose-built Fisher Library was completed in 1908 at the southwest corner of the Quadrangle, with its former reading room now known as MacLaurin Hall. The library was moved to its present location in 1962. Although it appears to be one building, the university classifies it as two separate buildings which are connected by foyer areas on the lower floors.

Fisher North

(Building F03) was built in 1962 and has study spaces and student support services. This building also houses teaching spaces, the Rare Books and Special Collections and reading room, the MySydney Scholars Lounge, and the Aboriginal and Torres Strait Islander student spaces.

Fisher South

(Building F04) was built in 1967 with copper-clad outer walls. This building also houses Library collections including the East Asian general collection, and silent study spaces. The University Archives are located on level 9 of Fisher South (F04).

== Herbert Smith Freehills Law Library ==
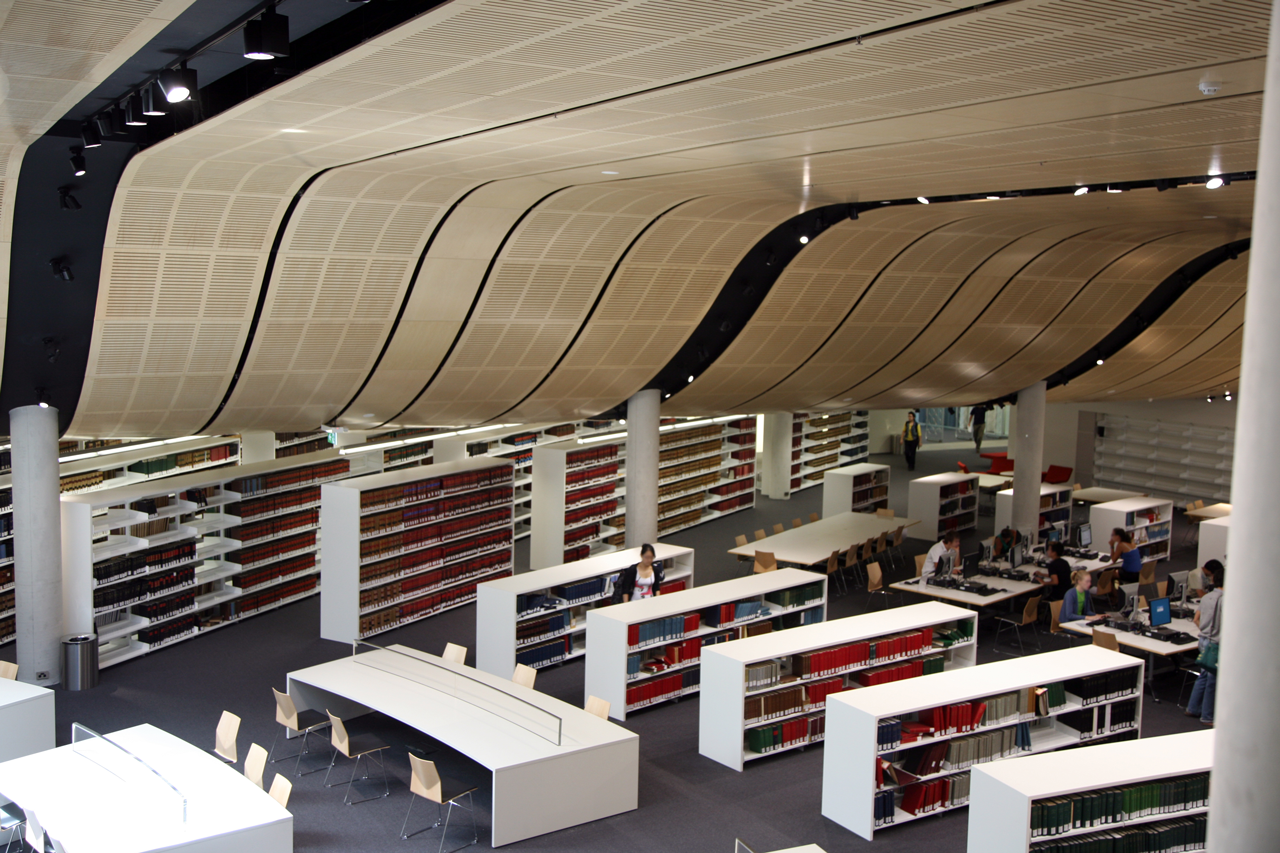
The interior of the Herbert Smith Freehills Law Library at the University of Sydney showing its curved ceiling

Named after Herbert Smith Freehills, the Law Library moved into the New Law Building (F10) on the Camperdown Campus in April 2009, along with the rest of the Sydney Law School.

Located on Eastern Avenue, adjacent to Victoria Park, the Law Library is for University of Sydney students and staff. It is spread over 5000 square metres of floor space and houses substantial collections that support the needs of the Law School.

The library consists of a ground floor that contains the majority of the collections, staff area, information desk, printing/photocopying facilities and computer access. Upstairs on the mezzanine level are the research collections and six more group study rooms.

== SciTech Library ==
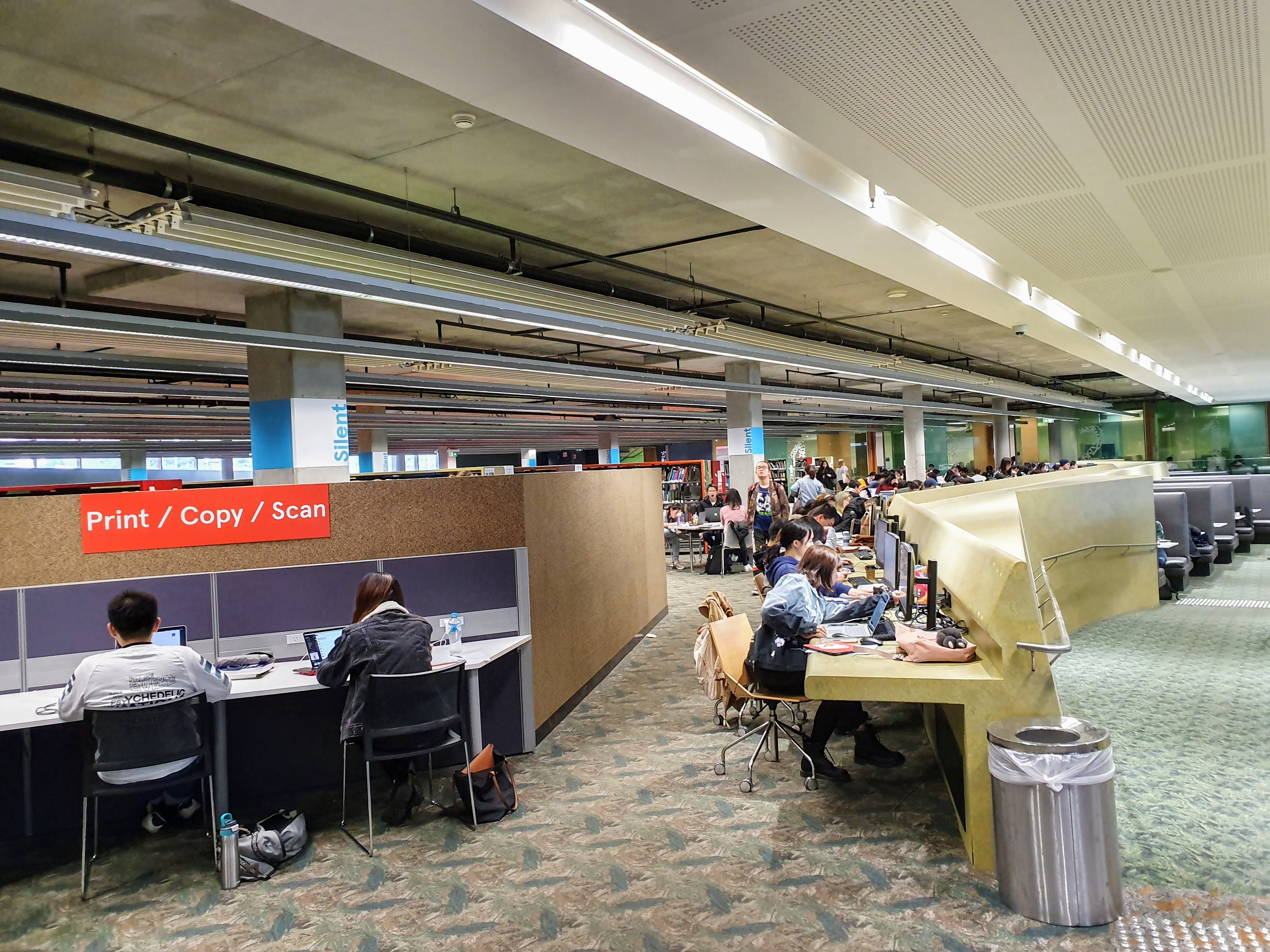
Inside the SciTech Library

Following an international design competition, the SciTech Library was opened in late 2008 on the first floor of the new Jane Foss Russell Building, at the junction between the Darlington and Camperdown campuses. It consolidates the collections of the former architecture, engineering, Madsen and mathematics libraries in one location.

There is an exhibition space, meeting and training rooms, private booths and group tables in the SciTech Library.

== ThinkSpace ==
ThinkSpace is a "technology showcase" and "creative play space". These technologies are supported by Peer Learning Advisers (PLAs) who guide, support and assist clients in using the ThinkSpace. The space was officially launched on 1 September 2016.

== CreateSpace ==
CreateSpace is on Level 4 of the Susan Wakil Health Building on the Camperdown Campus. It officially opened on 1 March 2021.

== Susan Wakil Health Building Library ==
Opened on 22 February 2021, this library occupies three levels of the new Susan Wakil Health Building on the Camperdown Campus, situated in the university's growing health precinct, near the Charles Perkins Centre and Prince Alfred Hospital (RPAH).

The Susan Wakil Health Building (SWHB) Library has physical collections with a focus on health sciences, nursing and midwifery.

== The Quarter ==
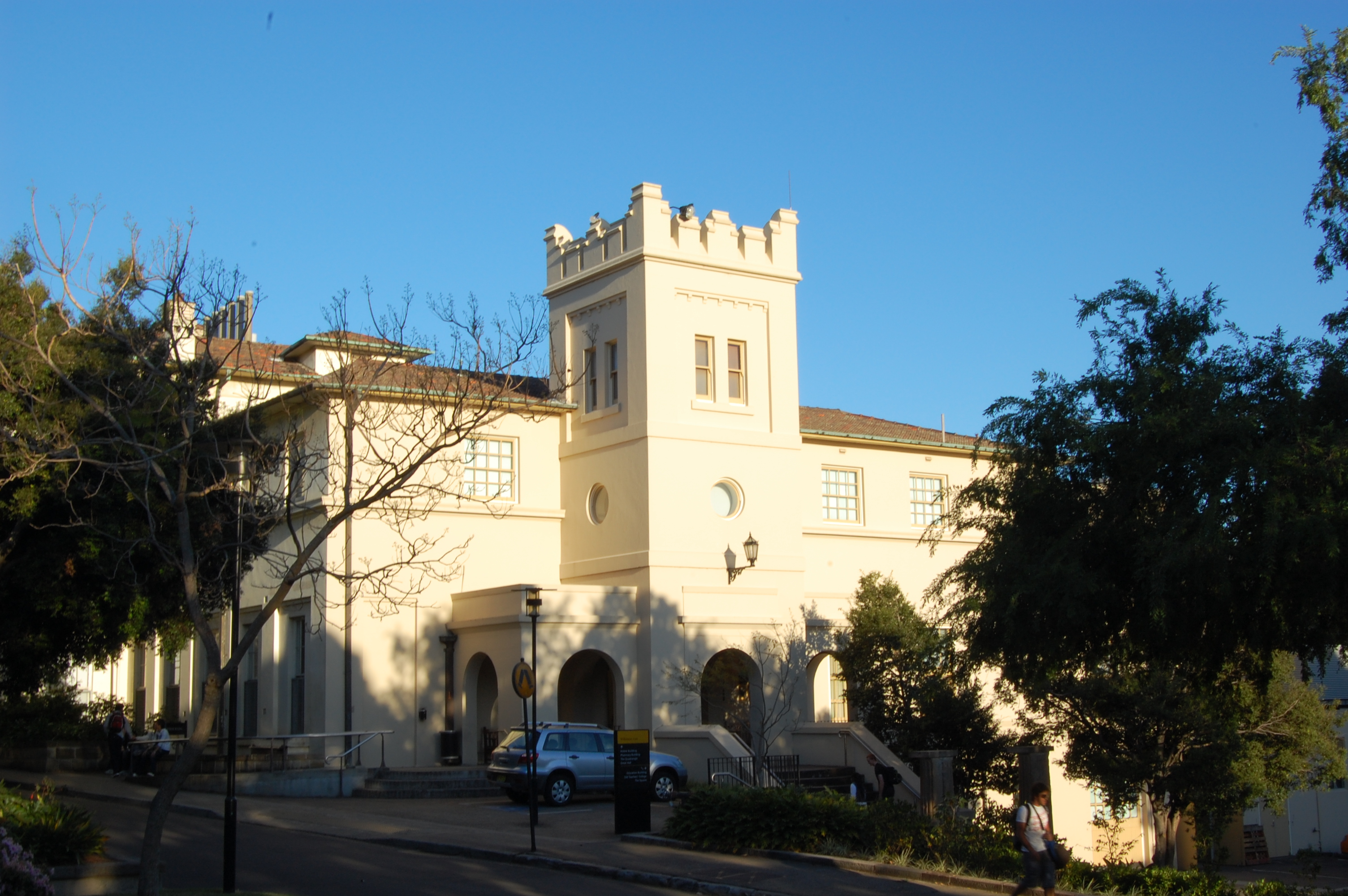
The Quarter

The Quarter is a postgraduate coursework space located on the ground floor of the Badham Building on Science Road next to the Holme Building, one of the centres of student activity on Camperdown Campus.

The Quarter was formerly called the Badham Library, and the Badham Library's collection was consolidated into the SciTech Library.

== Camden Commons ==
Camden Library is located in the University of Sydney Camden Campus, approximately 65 km west from the City of Sydney, located just outside Camden.

The library underwent a refurbishment in 2015 as part of its transition to a library commons.

== Conservatorium Library ==
The Conservatorium Library is located within the Sydney Conservatorium of Music Building, Macquarie Street by the gates to Government House, right next to the Royal Botanic Gardens in the centre of the city.

The library was not always within the Greenway Building, in fact, due to space problems, many departments of the Conservatorium found themselves spread around the city during the last century. The library spent time in what is now the Intercontinental Hotel as well as other locations around Pitt and Hunter streets. The need for one location with enough space for the Sydney Conservatorium of Music prompted the State Government to step in and rebuild the Greenway Building at a cost of A$144 million. In 2001, upon completion of the works, the entire Conservatorium (including the library) moved back into what is now a renovation of a historical space.

The entrance level contains the display room for exhibits and the majority of the collection as well as the public access computers, printers and photocopiers. Level 1 includes the quiet study areas, the training room, and an AV room.
