= Mostafa Ajorlu =

Iranian military officer

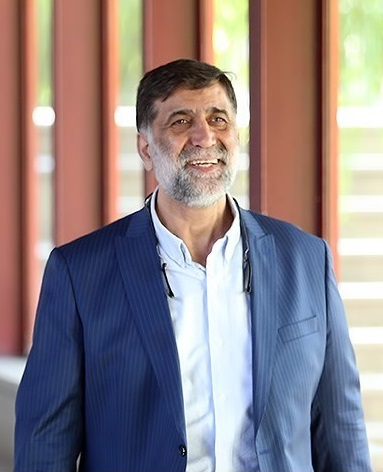
- Born: 1960 (age 65–66); Tehran, Iran
- Education: Tehran University; Imam Hussein University
- Military career
- Branch: Revolutionary Guards
- Conflicts: Iran–Iraq War

Mostafa Ajorlu (Persian: مصطفی آجرلو, born 1960) is an Iranian military officer in the Islamic Revolutionary Guard Corps and football administrator. He was the chairman of Tractor club from 2016 to 2018. He had been elected as the administrator of Esteghlal F.C. from 25 September 2021 to 2022.

== Previous positions ==
Ajorlu headed the following clubs:

- Moghavemat Tehran (1996–1998)
- Fath Tehran (1998–1999)
- Pas (2000–2005)
- Steel Azin (2009–2010)
- Tractor (2016–2018)
- Esteghlal (2021–2022)

== See also ==
- Hamidreza Moghaddamfar
