= Hossein Yari =

Iranian actor

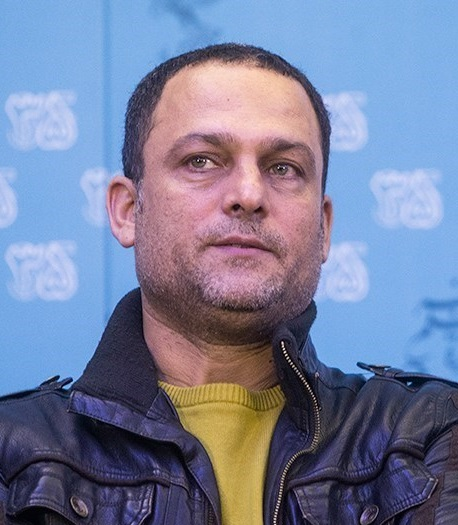
- Born: December 18, 1968 (age 57); Malayer, Iran
- Years active: 1980–present
- Height: 1.76 m (5 ft 9 in)
- Children: 3

Hossein Yari (also Hosein Yari, Persian: حسین یاری; born 1968 in Tehran, Iran) is an Iranian actor. He started acting in theatre first, then joined the Iranian TV.

== Filmography ==
- Blue Whale - 2019
- Wishbone - 2017
- Mazar-i-Sharif - 2017
- Baradar - 2016
- Hooshe Siah 2 (Dark Intelligence 2) - 2013
- Abrhaye Arghavani (Crimson Clouds) - 2011
- Yek Satr Vagheiat (One Line of Truth) - 2011
- Sa'adat Abad (Felicity Land) - 2010
- Hooshe Siah - 2010
- Mim Mesle Madar (M For Mother) - 2006
- Dame sobh (Day Break) - 2005
- Naqmeh - 2002
- Shabe Dahom (Tenth Night; TV series) - 2002
- Maryame Moghaddas (Holy Mary) - 2000
- Boloogh (Maturity) - 1999
- The Men of Angelos - 1998
- Silence Fly - 1998
- Donyaye Varuneh (Upside-down World) - 1997
- Sor'at (Speed) - 1995
- Akharin Marhaleh (The Last Stage) - 1995
- Hamleh Beh H3 (Attack on H3) - 1994
- Mantagheh Mamnoon'e (Forbidden Zone) - 1994
- Jaye Amin - 1993
- Goriz (Escape) - 1992
- Atash dar Kharman - 1991
- Hoor dar Atash - 1991
