= Catherine Perez-Shakdam =

French journalist, political analyst and commentator

- Education: University of London
- Occupations: Journalist; political analyst; commentator
- Years active: 2010s–present
- Known for: Commentary on West Asian and Islamic affairs
- Notable work: Arabia's Rising (2015); From Mecca to the Plain of Karbala (2016); A Tale of Grand Resistance (2016)
- Children: 2

Catherine Perez-Shakdam is a French journalist, political analyst and commentator. She specializes in West Asian and Islamic affairs. Shakdam is a former consultant for UNSC on Yemen and she is an expert on terrorism, radicalization and antisemitism.

== Early life ==
Shakdam was born into a secular Jewish family in France. Her maternal grandfather fought Nazis during the Nazi occupation of the country. Her paternal grandfather was a Holocaust survivor. She has a bachelor's degree in psychology, and two master's degrees in finance and communications from the University of London. During her studies at the University of London, she met a Muslim man from Yemen and later acted like she converted to Sunni Islam during their marriage. However, she later became a Shia Muslim and wrote several books and many articles about Shia Islam. She divorced her husband in 2014 and has custody of her two children. As of 2022, she now identifies as a Jew.

== Journalistic career ==
Prior to becoming a full-time journalist, she worked for Wikistrat, an Israeli geostrategic and analysis firm, for seven years. She wrote extensively for the Russian International Affairs Council, Tehran Times, IRIB, The Majalla, Press TV, HuffPost, the Foreign Policy Association, Yemen Post, The Oslo Times, Your Middle East, The Guardian, RT, Mehr News and Tasnim News agencies, The Foreign Policy Journal, The Duran, MintPress News, the American Herald Tribune, openDemocracy, The Age of Reflection and many more.

Shakdam is also the managing director of Access Media and served as Special Adviser for the Middle East for the late Prince Ali Seraj of Afghanistan. She is the director and founder of Veritas-Consulting. She was affiliated with Shafaqna Institute for Middle East Studies in the UK (2015–2017).

== Work in Iran ==
Shakdam traveled frequently to Iran and became a regular author in many Iranian news agencies such as Mashregh News, Tasnim News, Mehr News and even Iranian supreme leader's website "Khamenei.ir". In November 2021 Shakdam wrote in her blog in The Times of Israel that she is divorced and no longer a Muslim. She implied that her radical Muslim persona was in order to infiltrate Iran and other Muslim countries.

Shakdam traveled to Iran in 2017 and met with then candidate Ebrahim Raisi. She accompanied Raisi on his travels to Rasht and sat exclusively with him for an interview. Shakdam wrote in her blog that Iranian authorities trusted her because of her French nationality and marriage to a Muslim man. She wrote that she was invited by one of the important people of the revolution who studied in the United States.

In February 2022 a Telegram channel supporting the former Iranian President Mahmoud Ahmadinejad wrote an article based on the blog post in The Times of Israel that the highest level of Iranian government had been infiltrated by Israeli spies. Many Iranian news agencies immediately took down all the articles written by Shakdam and denied collaboration.

Shakdam wrote in her blog that she detested Islam's disdain for women. She further added that prior to her visit to Iran she neither argued nor revealed her true intentions.

Radical articles and pieces written by Shakdam were criticized heavily by many Jewish organizations such as Anti-Defamation League (ADL) and MEMRI without ever mentioning her Jewish ancestry.

Early in July 2025, following the Twelve-Day War and the deportation of Afghans from Iran, in a television interview former MP Mustafa Kavakebian criticized people who were downplaying the threat of espionage, saying they were distracting the public by shifting the focus to Afghan migrants. “Talking only about Afghan migrants takes attention away from the real security breaches”. According to him, the real threat was the likes of Shakdam's acts of espionage. On July 20 it was reported that legal proceedings were initiated against him for his claims. On 3 January 2026, Perez-Shakdam was introduced as a "former Mossad spy" by the CNN-News18 interviewer.

== Books ==
- Perez-Shakdam, C. (2015). Arabia's Rising: Under the Banner of the First Imam. (n.p.): CreateSpace Independent Publishing Platform, ISBN 9781517639044
- Perez-Shakdam, C. (2016). From Mecca to the Plain of Karbala: Walking with the Holy Household of the Prophet. (n.p.): CreateSpace Independent Publishing Platform. ISBN 9781539509264.
- Perez-Shakdam, C. (2016). A Tale of Grand Resistance: Yemen, the Wahhabi and the House of Saud. (n.p.): CreateSpace Independent Publishing Platform. ISBN 9781539585589.

== See also ==
- Nader Talebzadeh
