= Fars News Agency =

Iranian news agency

- Abbreviation: FNA
- Formation: 2003; 23 years ago
- Type: News agency
- Official language: Persian
- Managing Director: Payam Tirandaz
- Editor in Chief: Mohsen Mahdian
- Parent organization: Close to the IRGC
- Website: www.farsnews.ir

The Fars News Agency (Persian: خبرگزاری فارس) is a news agency in Iran that is close to the Islamic Revolutionary Guard Corps (IRGC), one of the three branches of the Islamic Republic of Iran Armed Forces. While it describes itself as "Iran's leading independent news agency", it is widely described by Western news media to be a "semi-official" news agency of the Government of Iran.

Fars has been described by the Iran Disinformation Project as the cornerstone of the Islamic Revolutionary Guard Corps' disinformation and propaganda campaign. Fars News' disinformation campaign "reaches across Iran's borders, spreading rumors and lies about dissidents, human rights, labor, political activists, and intellectuals." One propaganda technique is to consistently publish interviews with western pundits and analysts such as conspiracy theorist James Fetzer who echo Tehran's propaganda.

== History ==
The Fars News Agency was founded in 2003, a time when IRNA and ISNA were under Mohammad Khatami's reformist government control. According to Iran Disinformation Project, Hamidreza Moghaddamfar, advisor to IRGC commander-in-chief, was CEO of Fars from 2007 to 2011. He was replaced by Nizam-al-Din Mousavi, then-head of University of Tehran's Student Basij and IRGC-linked Javan newspaper. Under Mousavi, Fars "[launched] the career of many Iranian conspiracy theorists", covering personalities like Ali-Akbar Raefipour and Hassan Abbasi.

In addition to Persian reporting, the agency also provides news in English, Turkish, Arabic, and Dari. Fars formerly published all content on its website under the Creative Commons Attribution 4.0 International license.

=== Sanctions ===
The Fars News Agency .com domain has been blocked by sanctions applied by the US Treasury since 25 January 2020. On 15 September 2023, the United States Department of the Treasury added the Fars News Agency to the Office of Foreign Assets Control (OFAC)'s Specially Designated Nationals and Blocked Persons List.

== Controversial stories ==
=== Interview with Egyptian president ===
In June 2012, Fars released an interview with Egyptian president Mohamed Morsi in which Morsi is said to have told Fars that he wanted to restore ties with Iran and wanted to "review" the Egypt–Israel peace treaty. Morsi later disputed the authenticity of the interview. Fars responded by providing what it said was audio of the interview. Arabic newscaster Al Arabiya quoted unnamed experts who said it was not Morsi's voice.

=== Reposted story by The Onion ===
In September 2012, the agency picked up a story from The Onion, a satirical newspaper, about a supposed survey showing "an overwhelming majority of rural white Americans would rather vote for Iranian President Mahmoud Ahmadinejad than U.S. President Barack Obama in the upcoming U.S. elections". The Iranian version copied the original word-for-word, even including a made-up quote from a fictional West Virginia resident who says he would rather go to a baseball game with Ahmadinejad because "he takes national defense seriously, and he'd never let some gay protesters tell him how to run his country like Obama does."

The Fars News Agency later apologized for its mistake, but claimed that a majority of Americans would prefer anyone outside of the American political system to President Obama and American statesmen.

=== Time machine story ===
In April 2013, the agency carried a story claiming a 27-year-old Iranian scientist had invented a time machine that allowed people to see into the future. A few days later the story was removed, and replaced with a story quoting an Iranian government official that no such device had been registered.

=== Alien/extraterrestrial intelligence agenda reports ===
In January 2014, Fars posted a series of articles that suggested U.S. security policy was being driven by an "alien/extraterrestrial intelligence agenda". The report said that proof was found in a Federal Security Service report carried out by Edward Snowden. The report said that the United States government had been secretly run by a "shadow government" of space aliens since 1945.

=== Salman Rushdie fatwa ===
In February 2016, Fars was one of 40 Iranian news agencies that pledged money toward the bounty against Salman Rushdie in regards to The Satanic Verses controversy. Fars promised $30,000 for the killing of Rushdie.

=== Yemenite Jews ===
In November 2020, the Agency sparked controversy after it shared an article by Kayhan editor Hossein Shariatmadari denying the Holocaust and saying that the "real Holocaust" was against Yemenite Christians by the Jewish Himyarite Kingdom in 524 CE. Critics denounced the article as an antisemitic piece seeking to dehumanize Jews and downplay the brutality of the Holocaust.

=== "Where to Kill Trump?" video ===
In July 2026, Fars published a video on X and Telegram titled "Where to Kill Trump?", purporting to show the route taken by the presidential motorcade of Donald Trump to his Mar-a-Lago residence.

== See also ==
- List of Iranian news agencies
- Owj Arts and Media Organization
- Tasnim News Agency
