= Farajollah Salahshoor =

Iranian film director (1952–2016)

- فرج‌الله سلحشور
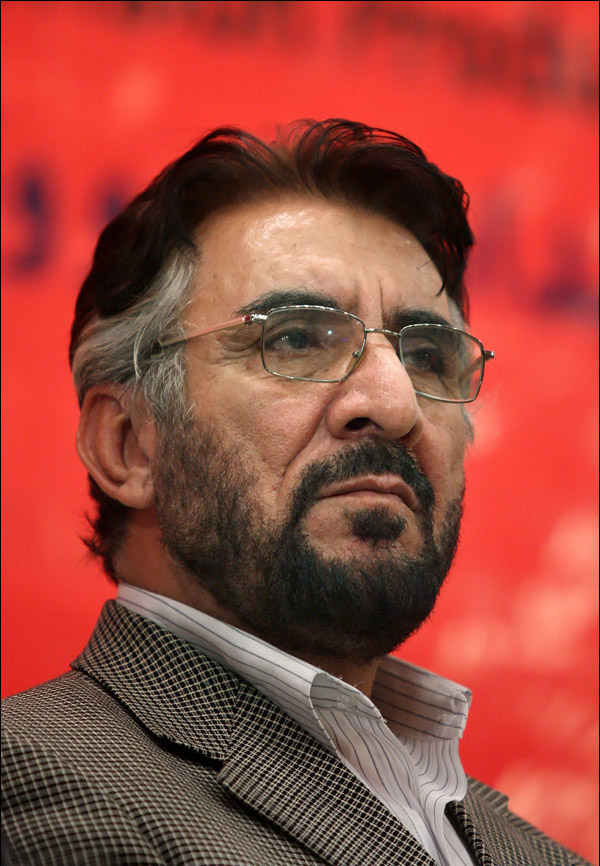
- Born: November 3, 1952; Qazvin, Iran
- Died: February 27, 2016 (aged 63); Tehran, Iran
- Years active: 1982–2016
- Notable work: Prophet Joseph

Farajollah Salahshoor (Persian: فرج‌الله سلحشور; 3 November 1952 – 27 February 2016) was an Iranian film director. He directed several popular religious films and TV series including Prophet Joseph and The Men of Angelos (about Seven Sleepers). He had a conservative view and believed in Islamic cinema. He died of lung cancer on 27 February 2016.

Salahshoor's work was primarily focused on the Islamic tradition and the Quran. He died before completing a series he was working on about the prophet Moses and the series remained unpublished.

== Selected filmography ==
=== As director ===
- Ayyub-e Payambar: about Job (biblical figure)
- The Men of Angelos
- Prophet Joseph (TV series)

=== As actor ===
- The Flight in the Night

=== As producer ===
- Tebyan Stories (TV series)
  - Istikhara
