= The Messiah (2007 film) =

- مسیح
- Directed by: Nader Talebzadeh
- Written by: Nader Talebzadeh
- Based on: Canonical Gospels; Quran; Gospel of Barnabas
- Produced by: Abdollah Saeedi
- Starring: Ahmad Soleiman Nia; Fathali Oveisi; Valiollah Momeni; Ahmad Najafi; Morteza Zarrabi; Mina Bagheri; Sirous Asnaghi
- Cinematography: Sadegh Mianji
- Music by: Loris Tjeknavorian
- Release dates: 18 October 2007 (Festival of Cinema and Religion)
- Running time: 82 minutes
- Country: Iran
- Language: Persian

The Messiah, also referred to as Jesus, Jesus, the Spirit of God,Good Tidings of the Savior (Persian: بِشارت مُنجی, romanized: Bešārat-e Monjjy), is a 2007 Iranian film directed by Nader Talebzadeh (1953—2022), depicting the life of Jesus from an Islamic perspective, based not only on the canonical gospels, but also the Qur'an, and, it would seem, the Gospel of Barnabas. The latter conforms to the Islamic interpretation of the origins of Christianity. Iranian actor Ahmad Soleimani Nia plays the role of Jesus. Some Islamic organizations cite it in support of the Islamic view of Jesus.

Talebzadeh said of The Passion of the Christ, "Gibson's film is a very good film. I mean that it is a well-crafted movie but the story is wrong." The film has two endings, one from the Christian Bible and one from the Qur'an.

It is a two-hour-plus feature film and a TV series shot for Iranian TV.

== Cast ==
- Ahmad Soleimani Nia - Jesus
- Valiollah Momeni
- Ahmad Najafi
- Fathali Oveisi
- Morteza Zarabi - Judas

== Crew ==
- Director of Photography: Sadegh Mianji
- Sound: Seyed Jalal Hosseini
- Set & Costume Designer: Ahmad Soleimani-Nia
- Make-up Designer: Morteza Zarrabi
- Executive Producer: Abdollah Saeedi
- Production Assistant: Saeed Kazemi
- Photographer: Saeed Sourati
- Music: Loris Tjeknavorian

== Series ==
The movie has been adapted into a television series and shown on Iranian TV. Variety stated that "With over 1,000 actors and extras, it is one of the largest film productions ever attempted in Iran. The longer version of the film is airing as 20 45-minute episodes after a theatrical version is released here." The series is being dubbed in many languages, including Arabic for showing on Arab television stations.

A showing of the series based on the film by two Lebanese television stations Al-Manar and National Broadcasting Network during the Holy month of Ramadan was suspended after the broadcast of one initial episode, as the Christian religious authorities in the country demanded broadcasts to be suspended because many portrayals in the film contradict with traditional Christian church beliefs about Jesus. These were scheduled broadcasts in a series adapted to television and dubbed into Arabic and shown on many Arab television stations during Ramadan.

=== Crucifixion ===
The film portrays Jesus as a prophet, not as a son of God, and claims that someone else was crucified in his place. Talebzadeh's biopic shows Judas Iscariot being crucified instead of Jesus.

In contrast, the majority of Christians believe Jesus is the Son of God (himself being divine and part of the Godhead) and thus part of the Holy Trinity, and that he died by crucifixion to accomplish humanity's salvation before resurrecting and ascending to heaven.

== Awards and festivals ==
The film was played at the Philadelphia Film Festival. The 2007 Religion Today Film Festival in Italy has given the movie an award for promoting interfaith understanding.

== See also ==
- List of Islamic films
- Saint Mary (film)
- The Kingdom of Solomon
- Iranian cinema
