= The Men of Angelos =

Iranian TV series

- Persian: مردان آنجلس
- Genre: Religious-historical
- Based on: Seven Sleepers Story (based on Quranic teachings)
- Directed by: Farajollah Salahshoor
- Starring: Jafar Dehghan
- Country of origin: Iran
- Original language: Persian

Production
- Producer: Mohsen Ali Akbari

Original release
- Network: IRIB TV1
- Release: 1997

The Men of Angelos (Persian: مردان آنجلس Mardān-e Ānjelos), also known as The Companions of the Cave (Persian: اصحاب کهف Ashāb-e Kahf), is a 1997 Iranian television series directed by Farajollah Salahshoor. It depicts the story of the Seven Sleepers according to the Islamic traditions and Qur'an (mentioned in Surah al-Kahf).

== Cast ==
- Jafar Dehghan — Maximilian
- Mahtab Keramati — Helen
- Jahanbakhsh Soltani — Decius
- Hossein Yari — Julius
- Reza Tavakkoli — Antonius
- Ardalan Shoja Kaveh — Adonia
- Reza Iranmanesh — Ioannis
- Majid Moshiri — Matius
- Yousef Moradian — Martinus
- Esrafil Alamdari — Sodinanus
- Reza Iranmanesh — Juvanis
- Mohammad Poursattar – Arius

== Music ==
1. Prologue (3:24)
2. Lady Helen (2:11)
3. Byzantine, Philadelphia (2:47)
4. Plutonius (3:03)
5. Maximilian (4:51)
6. Adonijah (2:56)
7. Looking for Maximilian (2:14)
8. Christian Blood (2:39)
9. Lady Helen (Reprise) (1:28)
10. The Bandits (3:40)
11. Julius and Maximilian (2:58)
12. End of the Road (2:20)
13. Hiding Place (3:31)
14. Ambush (0:58)
15. The Emperor (6:39)
16. Hymn (2:01)
17. Celebration (2:17)
18. Haleluja (My God, the God of Jesus) (0:54)
19. Incapable Idols (3:36)
20. Surrounding (5:27)
21. A Friend (3:18)
22. A Sacrifice for Apollo (4:41)
23. Crucifixion (2:35)
24. The Revelation (1:49)
25. The Companions of the Cave (2:13)
26. Fright (1:58)
27. The End (3:20)
28. Toward Welcoming The Men of God (6:09)
29. In Memory of Helen (2:31)
30. Reception (2:18)
31. Decius (1:41)
32. The Decision (1:17)
33. In Memory of Mother (5:32)
34. Penitence (2:46)
35. Searching for Escapees (4:14)
36. Tunnel (2:24)
37. Detecting the Christians (2:50)
38. Capturing Christians (2:14)
39. Footprint (1:51)
40. Informer (1:47)
41. Assassination (3:02)
42. Thought (0:47)
43. Adonijah (Alternate Version) (2:56)
44. Lady Helen (Alternate Version) (2:10)
45. My God, the God of Jesus (Reprise) (0:51)
46. The Decision (Alternate Version) (1:17)
47. Toward Welcoming Men of God (Reprise) (3:05)

== Special edition gifted to the Pope ==
During Mohammad Khatami's visit to the Vatican City in March 1999, he met with Pope John Paul II. During the meeting, the two exchanged gifts. The Pope presented the Iranian President with an engraved decorative frame. In return, Khatami gifted the Pope the complete series of The Men of Angelos on six VHS tapes.

== See also ==
- List of Islamic films
