= Leila Bolukat =

Iranian actress

- لیلا بلوکات
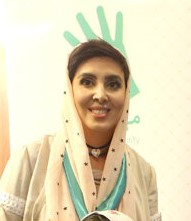
- Bloukat, June 2017
- Born: 25 November 1981 (age 43); Tehran, Iran
- Occupation: Actress
- Years active: 2005–present

Leila Bolukat (Persian: لیلا بلوکات born 25 November 1981) is an Iranian actress. Her works include Yousuf e Payambar (2007), Amaliyate Mahde Koodak (2012) and Aseman Hamishe Abri Nist (2009), as well as Agha Yousef (2009), Zamani Baraye Asheghi (2012), and As O Pas (2016).

== Conviction ==
In 2023, Balukat was convicted by the Judiciary of the Islamic Republic of Iran for non-compliance with hijab regulations. The penalties imposed included a two-year ban on engaging in activities in mainstream media, including domestic and international platforms, acting, and promotional activities in both physical and virtual spaces; a two-year travel ban; a five-year prohibition on direct or indirect activities in virtual spaces; a requirement to study and summarize a book within one month; and a ten-month suspended imprisonment sentence in one of Semnan Province's prisons, with six months of the sentence suspended for five years.

== Filmography ==
=== Film ===
Year	Title	Director	Role
2022	They Loved Me	Mohammadreza Rahmani	
2017	Everything Is Normal	Mohsen Damadi	Blind Girl
2016	Calm Breaths	Meysam Hashemi Taba	
2016	Short Like Life	Shahreh Soltani	
2015	Dracula	Reza Attaran	Javad's Sister-in-Law
2015	Destitute	Arash Moayerian	Fariba
2013	Five Stars	Mahshid Afsharzadeh	Shaghayegh
2012	Mirror and Candelabrum	Bahram Bahramian	
2012	Kindergarten Operation	Farzad Azhdari	
2011	Pickpocket of South Street	Siavash Asadi	Secondhand Clothing Seller
2011	Mr. Yousef	Ali Rafii	Yousef's Bride
2001	Black Zangi	Ebrahim Ebrahimian	
2009	Deportees 2	Masoud Dehnamaki	Ba'athist Reporter
2005	Abraham, Friend of God	Mohammadreza Varzi	Reneh

=== Television ===
Year	Title	Director	Notes
1998	Days of Life	Siroos Moghadam	Network 3, 35 episodes
2000	Companion	Ghasem Jafari	Network 3, 30 episodes
2000	Water King	Rahim Rahimipour	Network 2, 13 episodes
2001	Gray Land	Morteza Ahmadi Harandi	Network 2, 26 episodes
2001	Taste of Childhood 2	Masoud Rashidi	Network 2, 10 episodes, Children's and Youth Group
2002	Wasted Effort	Abdollah Bakideh	Network 1, 20 episodes
2003	One Like Me	Mohsen Shahmohammadi	Network 1, 30 episodes, Aired during Ramadan
2004–2008	Prophet Joseph	Farajollah Salahshoor	Network 1, 45 episodes, Role as Nefertiti
2005	Godfather	Mohammadreza Varzi	Network 1, 12 episodes
2006	Day of Departure	Javad Afshar	Network 5, 25 episodes
2008	Weary Hearts	Siroos Alvand	Network 1, 15 episodes, Played in "Braveheart" episode
2010	Injury	Mohammad Mahdi Asgarpour	Network 3, 30 episodes, Aired during Ramadan
2010	The Sky Is Not Always Cloudy	Saeed Alamzadeh	Network 1, 31 episodes
2011	Light and Shadow	Arash Moayerian	Network 5, 37 episodes
2012	Secret and Prayer	Flora Sam	Network 1, 5 episodes
2012	Hidden Secret	Flora Sam	Network 1, 27 episodes, Aired during Ramadan
2013	Time for Love	Mohammad Hossein Latifi	Network 5, 10 episodes, Aired during Muharram
2018	Hashtag Aunt Cockroach	Mohammad Moslemi	Home Video Network, 15 episodes, Aired from February 2018
2018	Moment of Twilight	Homayoun Asadian	Network 3, 50 episodes
2019	Forgotten	Bahram Bahramian	Network 1, 50 episodes
2019	Destiny (Seasons 1 and 2)	Mohammadreza Kheradmandan (Season 1), Alireza Bazrafshan (Season 2)	Network 2, 50 episodes
2020	Destiny (Season 3)	Mohammadreza Kheradmandan	Network 2, 25 episodes
2022	Destiny (Season 4)	Mohammadreza Kheradmandan	Network 2

== Theatre ==
- Gabriel's Song (directed by Mohsen Moeini), Tehran, Andisheh Hall; June 2015 (actor)

The Chant of Gabriel's Wing is a treatise from Shahab al-Din Yahya ibn Habash Suhrawardi. This play is written by Mohsen Moeini and Adapted from Shahab al-Din Yahya ibn Habash Suhrawardi's book. The producer of this theater is Negin Mirhasani Vahed

- Mask, directed by Behzad Eghtaie, Shahrzad Theater Complex, (2019)
- Lust and Seven Minutes, directed by Alireza Mehran, (2019)
- Duck Hunting (directed by Hamidreza Qotbi), Tehran, Iranshahr Theater - Master Nazerzadeh Kermani Hall; June 2016 (actor)
- A Doll's House (directed by Javad Molania), Tehran, Niavaran Cultural Center, Persian Gulf Hall; December 2015–January 2016 (actor)
- The Taming of the Shrew (directed by Bahram Tashakor), Tehran, Koroush Cinema Complex - Alborz Hall; July–August 2015 (actor)
- Siavash's Day (directed by Shokrollah Goodarzi), Tehran, Sanglaj Theater; May–June 2013 (actor)
