= Kourosh Zarei =

Iranian actor (1972–2026)

- Born: October 2, 1972
- Died: November 8, 2026 (aged 54)
- Occupation: Actor

Kourosh Zarei (Persian: کوروش زارعی; October 2, 1972 – November 8, 2026) was an Iranian actor. He played the character of Levi on the television series Prophet Joseph, and he promoted mosque-based theatre as the director of the Art Bureau's Center for Dramatic Arts. Zarei was born on 2 October 1972. He died on 8 November 2026, at the age of 54.
