= Saint Mary (film) =

- DVD release cover
- Directed by: Shahriar Bahrani
- Written by: Mohammad Saeed Bahmanpoor, Hossein Nuri (rewriting and development)
- Story by: Qur'an
- Based on: Mary mother of Jesus
- Produced by: Mohsen Aliakbari
- Starring: Shabnam Gholikhani; Parviz Poorhosseini; Mohammad Kasebi; Jafar Dehghan; Hossein Yari; Mohsen Zehtab; Zahra Saeedi; Afsaneh Naseri
- Cinematography: Hasan Pouya
- Edited by: Shahriar Bahrani
- Music by: Majid Entezami
- Distributed by: Sima Film; WN Media
- Release date: July 26, 2001
- Running time: 114 minutes
- Country: Iran
- Language: Persian

Saint Mary (Persian: مریم مقدس, also Maryam al-Muqaddasah, Maryam Moghaddas, Maryam Adhraa Maryam Al-Muqadasa; "The Honourable/Blessed Saint Mary") is a 2001 Iranian film by director Shahriar Bahrani, depicting the life of Mary the mother of Jesus, based on the Quran and Islamic tradition.

== Plot ==
In the year 16 BC, the people of Jerusalem are awaiting the birth of the son of Imran. Instead of the much-anticipated "Messiah", a girl is born to Imran and Anna. The latter names her Mary, which means "Servant of God". At the age of six, Mary is presented at the Temple, and remains there under the protection of the priest Zechariah until she turns sixteen.

While in seclusion, Mary spends all of her time in labour and prayers, and is harassed by the Jewish priests. She achieves such holiness that the angel Gabriel appears to her, foretelling that she will bear a holy man. She later gives birth to Jesus.

== Production ==
The film bases the story of the life of Saint Mary and the birth of Jesus – a prophet in Islamic tradition – on classical sources such as Chapter 19 of the Qur'an. Along with the character of Saint Mary, this film also featured the righteous character of the Prophet Zakariya, who in Islam was the guardian of Saint Mary.

The two-hour-long film was originally in Persian but has been dubbed into English by the Wilayah Network which was recorded in Hong Kong by Red Angel Media, and there is also another version with English subtitles. Footage from the film was used heavily in the 19 August 2007 British ITV documentary The Muslim Jesus.

== Cast ==
- Parviz Poorhosseini
- Shabnam Gholikhani
- Mohammad Kasebi
- Maryam Razavi
- Hossein Yari
- Jafar Dehghan
- Mehdi Faghih
- Mohsen Zehtab
- Afsaneh Naseri
- Roya Teymorian
- Shirin Bina
- Zahra Saeedi
- Kourosh Tahami
- Mohammad Poursattar

== See also ==
- List of Islamic films
- Iranian cinema
- List of historical drama films
