= Tasnim News Agency =

Semi-official news organisation in Iran

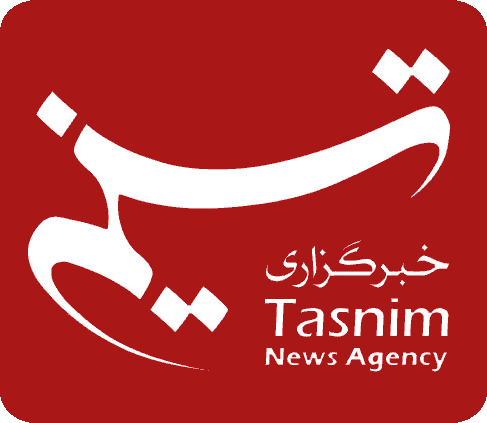
- Type: Broadcast newspaper online and mobile
- Country: Iran
- Founded: November 11, 2012; 13 years ago
- Headquarters: 12th Avenue, Mirzaye Shirazi Street, Tehran, Iran
- Broadcast area: Worldwide
- Owner: Islamic Revolutionary Guard Corps
- Key people: Majid Gholizadeh (chairman)
- Official website: www.tasnimnews.ir
- Language: Persian, English, Arabic, Turkish, Urdu, Hebrew, Russian

Tasnim News Agency (Persian: خبرگزاری تسنیم) is a semi-official news agency in Iran associated with the Islamic Revolutionary Guard Corps (IRGC). Launched in 2012, its purpose is to cover a variety of political, social, economic and international subjects along with many other fields. Tasnim publishes all content on its website under the Creative Commons Attribution 4.0 International license.

== Background ==
In Islam, Tasnim (تسنیم) is the name of a spring in Paradise from which those nearest to God are said to be able to drink. Tasnim's stated goal is to "[defend] the Islamic Republic against negative media propaganda campaigns and provide our readers with realities on the ground about Iran and Islam."

Tasnim is headquartered in Iran's capital Tehran, with reporters across the country and the Middle East.

=== Affiliation ===
The IRGC controls Tasnim, which often magnifies the IRGC's ideology. Tasnim is the IRGC's largest owned media outlet. During a visit to Tasnim's offices in 2023, then-IRGC commander-in-chief Mohammad Ali Jafari stated, "The faithful and revolutionary media have today a very heavy duty in confronting anti-Islamic and anti-human plots of the oppressors".

According to Tehran Bureau, Tasnim plays an active role in the Iranian government's state-led disinformation campaigns against protestors.

== History ==
Tasnim was founded on 30 June 2012 by Islamic Revolutionary Guard Corps (IRGC) commander Hamidreza Moghaddamfar, board chairman Jafar Darouneh, and CEO Majid Qolizadeh Zahmatkesh. Darouneh was head of Tehran's Department of Education during the presidency of Mahmoud Ahmadinejad.

In August 2023, the Afghan Taliban detained a photographer for Tasnim.

=== COVID-19 pandemic ===
According to the Anti-Defamation League, Tasnim has alleged in a series of propaganda articles that COVID-19 was part of "an American and Jewish plot at world domination through population control" hatched by Henry Kissinger, who is described as "the unique Jewish scholar and American strategist" and "a master controller of government and international finance."

=== International sanctions ===
On September 15, 2023, the European Union sanctioned Tasnim News Agency for "serious human rights violations in Iran," stating that the "news outlet is responsible for publishing false confessions by protesters on its website and social media accounts as well as for posting pictures of protestors on social media and asking readers to help identify them." The same day, the United States Department of the Treasury added Tasnim News Agency to the Office of Foreign Assets Control (OFAC)'s Specially Designated Nationals and Blocked Persons List.

Tasnimnews.com went offline on January 12, 2026, causing Tasnim to switch to the .ir domain. Tasnim and Fars News Agency claimed that the domain was blocked by the United States. In late 2026 its X.com accounts were suspended and its Telegram channel closed.

== Non-Persian versions ==
Tasnim staff includes English speakers, who translate some of the agency's articles into English. In 2022, Tasnim launched a Hebrew-language website. In 2023, Sputnik signed a deal with Tasnim to launch a Russian website.
