= Nader Talebzadeh =

Iranian film director and film producer (died 2022)

Nader Talebzadeh Ordoubadi
- نادر طالب‌زاده
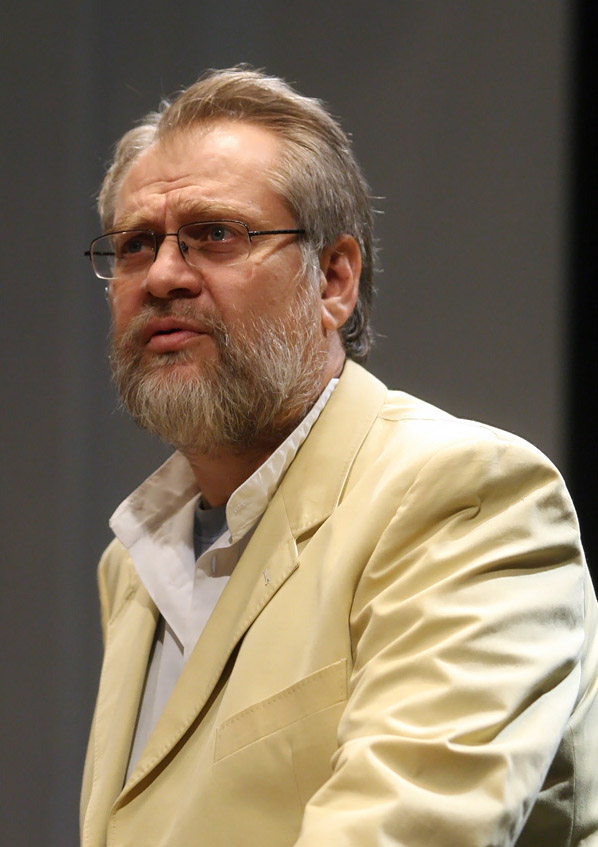
- Born: Nader-Gholi Talebzadeh Ordoubadi c. 1953/1954; Tehran, Iran
- Died: 29 April 2022 (aged 68); Tehran, Iran
- Other names: Nader Ordoubadi
- Years active: 1979–2022
- Notable work: The Messiah
- Television: Islamic Republic of Iran Broadcasting
- Spouse(s): Randi Hoffman, Azam Bagheri, Zeinab Mehanna
- Parents: Mansour Talebzadeh Ordoubadi (father); Marie Ordoubadi (mother)
- Relatives: Noah Mckay (brother); Nini Ordoubadi (sister)

Nader Talebzadeh (Persian: نادر طالب‌زاده), also known as Nader Ordoubadi, was an Iranian conservative journalist and filmmaker.

== Early life ==
Talebzadeh was born in 1953 or 1954 in Tehran. His father, Mansour Talebzadeh Ordoubadi, was a general officer serving in the Imperial Iranian Army. Several sources claimed that his father was instrumental in the 1953 Iranian coup d'état, overthrowing Mohammad Mosaddegh, a claim which Talebzadeh always denied during his lifetime. Talebzadeh himself told Iranian news sources that his mother was Seyyedeh Vahideh Amir Molouk Sharafi, a descendant of Ayatollah Sharafolaali Isfahani. At the funeral for Nasser Talebzadeh (also known as Noah McKay), Nader Talebzadeh's mother was listed as Marie Ordoubadi. Catherine Perez-Shakdam which is known as high level spy in iran work with him in iranian government news agencies, after his death claimed in timesofisrael that his mother was jew so according Halakha he was jew The couple had two other children. Talebzadeh's brother, Nasser Ordoubadi a.k.a. Noah A. McKay, was a medical doctor. His sister, Nini Ordoubadi lives in East Meredith, New York with her husband Anthony Chase, and owns a tea shop named Tay Tea.

Talebzadeh immigrated to the United States in 1970 and lived in the state of Virginia. Talebzadeh told the Los Angeles Times in 2008 that he studied at the American University. Afterwards, he studied cinema at Now York City's Columbia University.

== Career ==
Talebzadeh returned to Iran in 1979 to film the Iranian Revolution. He became a fixer for American media in Tehran due to his command of the English language and his earlier experiences, working closely with the crew of CBS News, which at the time had about thirty to forty personnel stationed in Iran. He also established contacts in the National Radio and Television, as well as the Ministry of National Guidance. According to Hamid Naficy, Talebzadeh left CBS after he became disillusioned with media portrayal of the revolution by Western outlets.

Using his connections, he then made a 35-minute documentary named Vaqeiyat (lit. 'Reality') about Western bias in reporting about the hostage crisis, which included using juxtaposition techniques to mix interviews he had done with foreign correspondents covering Iran and reports aired by their media.

During the 1990s, he irregularly contributed to Sobh, an anti-intellectual publication edited by Mohammad Nassiri.

=== Conference organizing ===
Talebzadeh was a key organizer of several controversial conferences, including the International Conference to Review the Global Vision of the Holocaust (2006), the International Conference on Hollywoodism (2011–2013) and the New Horizon Conference (2013–2019).

The U.S. federal government accused Talebzadeh of working closely with the Islamic Revolutionary Guard Corps (IRGC) and traveling across the world to recruit assets for the Quds Force under cover of inviting guests to conferences. Talebzadeh denied allegations of providing the IRGC with information. He was put on the sanctions list by the U.S. Department of the Treasury in 2019 for "supporting intelligence and cyber targeting of U.S. persons".

According to George Michael, Talebzadeh introduced his personal friend Michael Collins Piper to Iranian President Mahmoud Ahmadinejad and the two met on the sidelines of a press conference in the New York City after the latter's speech at the United Nations. Piper was then invited to Iran by Ahmadinejad and participated in International Conference to Review the Global Vision of the Holocaust in 2006. Other figures personally acquainted with Talebzadeh include Aleksandr Dugin, Ibrahim Mousawi, Louis Farrakhan, and Catherine Perez-Shakdam.

=== Partial filmography ===
- Vaqeiyat (lit. 'Reality', 1979)
- Zaban-e Hal (lit. 'The Expression of Feeling', 1980s)
- Khanjar va Shaqayeq (lit. 'Dagger and Poppy', 1992), documentary series about the Bosnian War
- The Messiah (2007)
- I Was There (2008), a 9/11 conspiracy documentary
- Secret, a show on state television

== Personal life ==
According to John Gaffney, a classmate and friend of Talebzadeh at the Columbia University, Talebzadeh had a partially deaf girlfriend from Chicago named Randi Hoffman. New York public marriage license data show that Talebzadeh married Hoffman during the time he spent in United States. According to Hoffman's twitter page, she later accompanied him back and spent time in Iran acting as a journalist for CBS news. Talebzadeh later married twice, first to Azam Bagheri, and later in life to Zeinab Mehanna, a Lebanese woman.

== Views ==
Talebzadeh was politically a conservative and co-founder of the Popular Front of Islamic Revolution Forces. He was staunchly against Akbar Hashemi Rafsanjani and technocratic policies of his administration.

Though described as a proponent of anti-Americanism, it has been claimed that he held American citizenship. In 2013, Thomas Erdbrink who served as bureau chief for The New York Times in Tehran, referred to him as an "Iranian-American".
