= Islamic Art: Mirror of the Invisible World =

American television documentary (2011)

- Directed by: Robert H. Gardner
- Starring: Oleg Grabar; Mohamed Zakariya
- Narrated by: Susan Sarandon
- Theme music composer: Charles David Denler
- Country of origin: United States
- Original language: English

Production
- Producers: Alex Kronemer; Michael Wolfe
- Editor: Jeremie Morrison
- Running time: 90 minutes
- Production company: Unity Productions Foundation

Original release
- Network: PBS
- Release: July 7, 2012

Islamic Art: Mirror of the Invisible World is an American PBS documentary film that showcases the variety and diversity of Islamic art. It discusses Islamic culture and its role in the rise of world civilization over the centuries. It was produced in 2011 by Alex Kronemer and Michael Wolfe of Unity Productions Foundation and directed by Robert H. Gardner.

The film had its world premiere at the Kennedy Center in Washington DC on December 1, 2011. It was originally broadcast nationwide on July 6, 2012 on PBS, as part of its Arts Summer Festival programming.

The film was screened at the Minnesota Film Festival and at the Arab Film Festival in San Francisco. It was given the Accolade Global Film Competition's Award of Excellence in 2013. and was named Best Educational Film at the International Family Film Festival.

The film has been produced in DVD format, and is in the collection of about 500 libraries around the world.

== Content ==
Islamic Art: Mirror of the Invisible World shows audiences nine countries (Egypt, Israel, Syria, Tunisia, Turkey, Iran, Spain, Mali and India) and over 1,400 years of history. It presents the stories behind many well-known works of Islamic art and architecture.

The film is narrated by Susan Sarandon, and informs its audience about Islamic art, from ornamented palaces and mosques to ceramics, carved boxes, paintings and metal work. It compares the artistic heritages of the West and East. The film also examines Islamic calligraphy and the use of water as an artform.

=== Appearances ===
Among the people in the film are:

- Mohammad Al-Asad – Jordanian architect and architectural historian, and the founding director of the Center for the Study of the Built Environment in Amman
- Sheila S. Blair – Norma Jean Calderwood Co-Chair Of Islamic and Asian Art, Boston College
- Jonathan M. Bloom – Norma Jean Calderwood Co-Chair Of Islamic and Asian Art, Boston College
- Afshan Bokhari – Assistant Professor of Art History, Suffolk University
- Oleg Grabar (1929–2011) – Art historian and archeologist.
- Ruba Kana'an – Specialist in Islamic art, the urban histories of pre-modern Muslim societies, and the interface between art and law in Muslim contexts
- Amy Landau – Associate Curator of Islamic Art and Manuscripts at the Walters Art Museum
- Roderick J. McIntosh – Professor of Anthropology at Yale University
- D. Fairchild Ruggles – Professor of Landscape Architecture at the University of Illinois at Urbana–Champaign and Co-Director of the Collaborative for Cultural Heritage and Museum Practices at Illinois.
- Gary Vikan – Director of the Walters Art Museum
- Kjeld Von Folsach – Director of the David Collection in Copenhagen
- Mohammed Zakariya – Muslim convert and master Arabic calligrapher

== See also ==
- List of Islamic films
- Islamic architecture
