= Gwen Kelly =

Australian writer (1922 – 2012)

- Born: Gwen Nita Smith; 28 July 1922; Thornleigh, New South Wales
- Died: August 19, 2012 (aged 90)
- Education: University of Sydney
- Spouse: Maurice Nugent Kelly
- Writing career
- Genre: Novels
- Notable work: Always Afternoon

Gwen Kelly (28 July 1922 – 19 August 2012) was an award-winning Australian novelist, short story writer and poet, whose fourth novel, Always Afternoon, was made into a television mini-series in 1988. She was considered by some to be one of the "major Australian writers", whose novels are "an intimate chronicling of women's lives and of our yesterdays", "probing stereotypical Australian attitudes and behaviour".

== Early life ==
Gwen Nita Smith was born in Thornleigh, near Sydney, New South Wales, on 28 July 1922, the fourth of five daughters to accountant George Rupert Smith and his wife, Mary Ann (née Heath), who died when Gwen was just nine years old. She began writing early, and during her teenage years her poetry was published in the children's pages of newspapers and magazines. She attended Fort Street Girls High, and was awarded a scholarship to the University of Sydney in 1940. There she studied English and Philosophy, graduating in 1944 with first-class honours and the University Medal in English. One of her teachers was the Challis Professor of Philosophy (1927–58) John Anderson, a promoter of free thought in morality and politics and advocate of academic freedom. During her time at university, she experienced a "conversion" from the Baptist faith she had been brought up in, to atheism or agnosticism. In 1945, she married Classics scholar Maurice Nugent Kelly (1919–2011).

== Career ==
In the late 1940s, Gwen Kelly lectured briefly in philosophy at the University of Sydney and the University of New England. She continued to write, using the pen name Nita Heath, with short stories published in women's magazines and read on radio.

In 1954, Maurice Kelly was appointed to the University of New England, and he, Gwen and their young daughters Bronwyn and Jillian moved to Armidale. In 1960 and 1961, the family lived in Quebec, Canada, while Maurice completed his PhD at Laval University. Gwen Kelly's first novel, There Is No Refuge was published by Heinemann in 1961; it portrays the life of a young Sydney woman through the Great Depression and WWII, and her religious and moral challenges while at university. A UK reviewer considered her "an author with a future", but felt it necessary to mention that the outback, kangaroos and goannas did not feature at all in the novel. Canada provided the landscape for her second novel The Red Boat (1968), which "explores the extent to which a breakdown in childhood filial relationships can damage emotional development and well-being into adult life".

After returning to Armidale, Gwen was appointed Lecturer in English and Philosophy at the Armidale Teachers' College in 1964, and remained at the college until her retirement in the early 1980s. With a colleague, she wrote What is Right? Case Studies in the Ethics of Education (1970), in which "[t]rue conflicts between child and teacher are analysed by the authors ..... Conflicts that question the ethics of education; that dispute the teacher's powers in and out of class; that take into account the child's family background and personal behavior." She also wrote two guides to the writings of Henry Lawson (both in 1975), and continued to publish short stories in literary journals including The Literary Review, Southerly, Quadrant and Meanjin. In 1968 she won her first Henry Lawson Prose Award for her short story 'Day at Paffts'.

Her third novel, The Middle-Aged Maidens, published in 1976, is set in a private girls' school in a small town, and is narrated by one of the schoolteachers and three successive headmistresses. It has been described as a "fierce appraisal of small-town shortcomings ... [an] acerbic depiction of a private school for girls in Armidale." Reviewers appreciated that "the headmistresses' characters are sketched with sharp and brilliant lines ...... Gwen Kelly draws from us that complexity of response which is normal in life, rare in literature"; and described the novel as "spiteful, malicious, cunning, intensely readable ..... Delicious, Ms Kelly .... you know your Australia and you've a lovely way with words".

Also in 1976, her short story 'Country Show' was adapted for screen as a short film called Showtime, directed by Jan Chapman, produced by Sandra Levy, written by Margaret Kelly, with cinematography by Jan Kenny, and starring Jude Kuring and Lorna Lesley. Director Jan Chapman remembered that Showtime, "about the school system’s reaction to an affair between two women teachers", was shown at the Sydney Filmmakers Co-op cinema as part of a program about life in school, including Jane Oehr’s Stirring (1975) .... [and] Ken Cameron’s first film Sailing To Brooklyn (1974)". (Note: This was a presentation titled The Three R's. Rebels, Romantics and Reactionaries beginning on 23 June 1978. The Ken Cameron film that Showtime played alongside, with Stirring, was Temperament Unsuited. The program later changed to Temperament Unsuited, Showtime and Sailing To Brooklyn.)

Always Afternoon (1981) is perhaps Gwen Kelly's best-known work. Set during the years 1915-18, it concerns the lives of those in the small northern NSW town of Arakoon, where German nationals and Australian-born descendants of German migrants were interned in Trial Bay Gaol as enemy aliens. In Kelly's novel, a young local woman, Freda Kennon, falls in love with Franz, one of the internees who is a violinist. While some critics described the romance as a "vapid Romeo-and-Juliet scenario", other reviewers commented that "Kelly depicts very well Freda's adolescence and the conflict between her love and her puritanical upbringing. She is also successful in evoking the claustrophobic atmosphere in a small country town where life is "always afternoon", and "Kelly is good at creating the feeling of life within the jail walls ... [and] depicts the growing hatred in the district, growing to dangerous proportions" as local families are affected by the deaths and injuries suffered by their menfolk away fighting in the war. Always Afternoon was made into a TV mini-series in 1988 by SBS TV in cooperation with German network NDR, with actors from Australia, Germany and the UK. In a decade in which Australian male soldiers' experiences of WWI were notably explored in film (eg Gallipoli, Breaker Morant, The Lighthorsemen) and TV series (eg ANZACs), Always Afternoon provided a very different perspective, focusing on the home front and the experiences of civilians, particularly women, and those who had thought they were civilians but suddenly became aliens. Kelly's novel has also been the subject of analysis by several academics exploring responses to WWI in Australian literature.

Arrows of Rain (1988) was her fifth novel, "covering forty years in the life of the Drayton family beginning with the opening of the Sydney Harbour bridge and closing with the advent of the Whitlam government." During this time, "the two Drayton daughters have gone from decade to decade uncharitably playing favourites, unfairly claiming privileges and unpityingly scoring points against each other."

The following year, Kelly was awarded her second Society of Women Writers Hilarie Lindsay Award for achievement by a woman writer. Her work has been translated in Switzerland, East Germany and Indonesia. She was a generous supporter of the New England Writers Centre, and assisted many aspiring or mid-career writers.

== Selected works ==
=== Novels ===
- There Is No Refuge (1961)
- The Red Boat (1968) OCLC 41179
- The Middle-Aged Maidens (1976) ISBN 9780207162787, OCLC 801864341
- Always Afternoon (1981) ISBN 9780732224080, OCLC 1035868796
- Arrows of Rain (1988) ISBN 9780207157295, OCLC 22729933

=== Short stories ===
- The Happy People and Others (1988)

=== Poetry ===
- Fossils and stray cats : selected poems of Gwen Kelly & A.J. Bennett. (1981)

=== Non-fiction ===
- 'Portrait of a New Community: A Personal Impression' (1957) Meanjin Vol 16, Issue 4
- What is Right? Case Studies in the Ethics of Education (1970) (with Margaret Mackie)
- The Great Depression (1975)
- Henry Lawson and the Short Story (1975)
- Henry Lawson - The Realist and His Critics (1975)
- Lifted from Life (autobiography) (2001)

== Awards ==
- 1968 - Henry Lawson Festival of Arts - Award for Short Story - winner for 'Day at Paffts'
- 1974 - Australia Council for the Arts Literature Board 3 year Senior Fellowship
- 1976 - Henry Lawson Festival of Arts - Award for Short Story - winner for 'Mrs Mac Stuart in Retrospect'
- 1980 - Henry Lawson Festival of Arts - Award for Short Story - winner for 'The Dark of The World'
- 1980 - Melbourne Sun-Pictorial Award for 'Rondo for Catriona'
- 1981 - Henry Lawson Festival of Arts - Award for Short Story - winner for 'Obituary for Frances by Frances'
- 1981 - Society of Women Writers (NSW) Hilarie Lindsay Award for achievement by a woman writer
- 1989 - Society of Women Writers Hilarie Lindsay Award for achievement by a woman writer
