= Carol Rittner =

American nun and Holocaust historian

- Born: 1943 (age 82–83); Camp Hill, Pennsylvania, USA

Academic background
- Education: Immaculata University; PhD, 1978, Pennsylvania State University
- Thesis: Institutional purposes for staff development in higher education. (1978)

Academic work
- Institutions: Stockton University
- Notable works: The Courage to Care

Carol Rittner (born 1943) is an American nun and Holocaust historian. She is a Distinguished Emerita Professor of Holocaust and Genocide Studies and Dr. Marsha Raticoff Grossman Professor of Holocaust Studies at Stockton University.

== Early life ==
Rittner was born in 1943 and raised in Camp Hill, Pennsylvania, to a Catholic mother and Protestant father. She graduated from Bishop McDevitt Catholic High School and College Misericordia (now, Misericordia University. Rittner later earned her Doctor of Education from Pennsylvania State University.

== Career ==
In 1984, Rittner organized an international conference on the theme "Faith in Humankind: Rescuers of Jews during the Holocaust" for the Holocaust Memorial Council. A few years later, she produced a film titled The Courage to Care which was nominated for an Academy Award for Best Documentary (Short Subject). The documentary focused on three Christians who rescued Jews during the Holocaust. From 1986 until 1990, Rittner was the director of the Elie Wiesel Foundation for Humanity before leaving to become president of Mercyworks. Between 1994 and 1995, she was the Ida E. King Distinguished Visiting Professors of Holocaust Studies at Stockton University. After her visiting professorship ended, she was invited to stay as the Dr. Marsha Raticoff Grossman Professor in Holocaust Studies.

In 2000, she co-edited "The Holocaust and the Christian World: Reflections on the Past, Challenges for the Future" which examined Christian identity after Auschwitz. A few years later, she received the 2010 Sister Rose Thering Award from the New Jersey Commission on Holocaust Education.

Rittner was also a contributor to The Jewish Quarterly Review. In 2013, she published Rape as a Weapon of War & Genocide through Paragon Publishing. She also produced the film Sisters alongside director Robert Gardner which focused on the lives of five nuns. Rittner retired from teaching in 2015.
