= Arab and Jew =

Arab and Jew may refer to:

- Semitic peoples, the descendants of Shem, who are the Arabs and the Jews, according to the Book of Genesis
- Arab Jews, people who are both Arab and Jew
- Arab and Jew: Wounded Spirits in a Promised Land (book) an award-winning 1986 non-fiction book by David K. Shipler

== See also ==
- Ashkenazi Jews, the traditional Jewish group of Western, Central and Eastern Europe
- Palestinian Jew
- Israeli Arab
- Arab (disambiguation)
- Jew (disambiguation)
