= Zoomo =

Zoomo may refer to:

- Zoomo, an Australian ebike manufacturer
- Zoomo, a subsidiary of Pacific Arts Corporation
