= Hilarie Lindsay =

Australian toy manufacturer and writer (1922–2021)

- Born: 18 April 1922; Sydney, New South Wales, Australia
- Died: 5 May 2021 (aged 99); Vaucluse, New South Wales, Australia
- Education: Deakin University; Sydney University
- Writing career
- Genres: Short stories, biography, children's instructional
- Notable work: The Washerwoman's Dream

Hilarie Lindsay MBE OAM (18 April 1922 – 5 May 2021) was an Australian toy manufacturer and writer of short stories, poetry, instructional texts, biography and other genres. She was a former president of the Toys and Games Manufacturers' Association of Australia and of the Society of Women Writers (Australia), who has been inducted into the Australian Toy Association Hall of Fame and the National Pioneer Women's Hall of Fame, Alice Springs. Her best-known work, The Washerwoman's Dream, was a biography of Jane Winifred Steger, described by one reviewer as "enthrallingly readable"; it has become an Australian classic.

== Personal life ==
Hilarie Elizabeth Dyson was born in Sydney, New South Wales, on 18 April 1922. She attended a business college in Sydney in 1939, and in 1944 she married Philip Singleton Lindsay, with whom she had two daughters and a son.

Lindsay died in May 2021 at the age of 99.

== Career ==
=== Toy making ===
Hilarie Lindsay's husband was the son of the founder of the toy company A.L. Lindsay & Co, which produced children's dress-up costumes, cubby houses and play tents in the Sydney suburb of Leichhardt. Hilarie Lindsay was active in the company for over 40 years, as marketing manager, and designing and making costumes, particularly for girls. She sought that the girls had as many costumes as the boys had as she created the outfits thus ensuring there was gender equality.

She was one of the first women to serve on the committee of the Toys and Games Manufacturers' Association of Australia (TAGMA), and was instrumental in establishing the first toy fairs in Sydney and Melbourne. In 1969, she was elected as the first woman president of TAGMA, and the first woman president of any division of the Australian Chamber of Manufacturers. In these roles, she promoted the quality and durability of Australian-made toys, raised issues such as the impact of increasing litigation on toy manufacturers' insurance costs, and lobbied for quotas on imported toys to guarantee Australian toy manufacturers a greater share of the market. In 1984, the company, by then trading as Lindsay's Toy Factory, Leichhardt, opened a museum of toys and books, because, Hilarie Lindsay claimed, "today's children have little idea of what it was like to be a child 50 years ago." She was inducted into the Australian Toy Association Hall of Fame in 1998.

=== Writing ===
Hilarie Lindsay began writing as a child, but was first published in 1966, after winning the Henry Lawson Festival of Arts Award for Short Story that year, as Lindsay Dyson, a pen name she also used in writing poems and newspaper articles. She was also awarded the same prize the following year. In the early 1970s, Lindsay's established an imprint called Ansay, and Hilarie Lindsay published a series of books for children on making toys and games. Among these were the comprehensive volume One hundred and one toys to make (1972), and smaller books focused around topics such as puppets, dolls, rainy days and sunny days, with step-by-step instructions clearly illustrated, which were "sensibly priced .... in easy-to-read big type". She also wrote a well-received guide for teenagers setting up home for the first time, You're On Your Own. She continued writing short stories, and also wrote a series of stories for children about Mr and Mrs Poppleberry, "an elderly couple who always tackle problems without using any sort of violence".

Hilarie Lindsay was president of the Society of Women Writers (Australia) from 1971-1973 and again in 1975-1977. In that role, she drew attention to the difficulties faced by women who write, encouraged Aboriginal women to write, and lobbied for the removal of questions about gender and marital status from literary grant applications. She wrote beginners' guides to writing, and the Handbook, the Society of Women Writers. In 1974, she was awarded an MBE for services to literature. The same year she organised a playwrights' workshop for the Society of Women Writers, and commenced work on her own play, The Withered Tree, which she received an Australia Council for the Arts Literature Board grant to develop. The play, in which adult brothers and sisters try to come to terms with death after a funeral, was first performed in 1978, and was published in 1980. She edited several anthologies of short stories, memoirs and poetry, and in 1977 received the Queen Elizabeth II Silver Jubilee Medal. From 1982-1984, and again from 1992-1994, she was President of the Fellowship of Australian Writers.

In the early 1980s, Hilarie Lindsay commenced tertiary education externally through Deakin University, majoring in literature, and was awarded a Bachelor of Arts in 1991. She began postgraduate studies at Sydney University in 1992, intending to explore the difficulties which Australian women had experienced in being published. Her thesis narrowed to a study of one woman in particular, Jane Winifred Steger, who had published weekly serials during the early 1930s, and had been unable to publish fourteen novels. After completing her PhD in 1997, Hilarie Lindsay went on to publish a biography of Winifred Steger for a general readership, as The Washerwoman's Dream (2002). A story of a struggle to overcome adversity, set in outback Australia, involving bigamous marriages to Afghan cameleers, conversion to the Muslim faith and travel to Mecca, The Washerwoman's Dream has been described as "a life story as enthrallingly readable as any novel", in which "the strength of the narrative .. rests on the firm foundation of Lindsay's thorough research". It has since become an Australian classic, and as of 2018, is in its third edition and has also appeared in braille and as an audiobook. It has also been drawn on for a museum exhibition about the Afghan cameleers, and for academic studies of whiteness in Australia.

In 1981, the Society of Women Writers (Australia) named in her honour the biennial Hilarie Lindsay Award for achievement by a woman writer. The Fellowship of Australian Writers (NSW) holds the Hilarie Lindsay Young Writers Short Story and Poetry competitions in alternate years. In 2006, Hilarie Lindsay was awarded the Medal of the Order of Australia, for service to literature and through a range of professional organisations mentoring aspiring writers.

== Selected works ==
=== Novel ===
- Murder at the Belle Vue (1982)

=== Short stories ===
- One for the road (1978)
- 'Home Fires' in Southerly (1992)

=== Poetry ===
- One woman's world (1980)
- 'Cousin George; Winter visit' (1991) in Southerly
- 'Mr Toad waits for Godot in Wales' (1994-1995) in Southerly
- 'Cooking Up a Poem (for Vivian Smith)' and 'Blood and Bone Man' (1998) in Southerly

=== Play ===
- The withered tree (A play in 2 acts) (1980)

=== Children's stories ===
- Midget Mouse finds a house (1978)
- Mr Poppleberry and the Dog's own daily. Adventures of Mr & Mrs Poppleberry Book 1 (1983)
- Mr Poppleberry and the milk thieves. Adventures of Mr & Mrs Poppleberry Book 2 (1983)
- Mr Poppleberry and Fred the white cockatoo. Adventures of Mr & Mrs Poppleberry Book 3 (1983)
- Noah's ark (1985)
- Mr Poppleberry gets the collywobbles. Adventures of Mr & Mrs Poppleberry Book 5 (?) (1985)
- Mr Poppleberry's birthday pie (1989)
- Midget Mouse goes to sea (1989)
- Mrs Poppleberry's cuckoo-chook (ca 1994)

=== Anthologies ===
- Ink no.2: 50th anniversary edition (1977)
- Echoes of Henry Lawson: Award winning stories & verse, Grenfell Lawson Festival, 1960-1981. (1981)
- When I was ten: memories of childhood, 1905-1985 (1993) (with Len Fox)
- Beyond the black stump of my pencil: an anthology of prose and verse / written by members of the Isolated Writers Regional of the Fellowship of Australian Writers (1993)
- Sydney life / an anthology of prose and verse, written by the members of the City Regional of the Fellowship of Australian Writers (1994) (with Patrick McGowan)
- Sydney life 99: an anthology of prose and verse, written by members of the City Regional of the Fellowship of Australian Writers (1999) (with Patrick McGowan)

=== Non-fiction ===
- Card & board games to make (1972)
- Soft toys & dolls to make (1972)
- One hundred and one toys to make (1972)
- The first puppet book (1976)
- You're on your own (teenage survival guide) (1976)
- Household chaos (1977)
- Grenfell sketchbook (Drawings by Stephen Pile; text by Hilarie Lindsay) (1977)
- Fun in the sun toys & games: fully illustrated -easy to follow instructions for children to understand (1977)
- First toys for toddlers: fully illustrated - easy to follow instructions for children to understand (1977)
- Toys & games for rainy days: fully illustrated -easy to follow instructions for children to understand (1977)
- So you want to be a writer: a beginner's guide (1977)
- The short story (1979)
- Learn to write (1979)
- The naked gourmet (1979)
- Handbook, the Society of Women Writers (Australia) (1980)
- Rescue at Wewak, World War II: an eye-witness account of the rescue of the crew of an American Mitchell Bomber shot down by the Japanese [by crew members of Catalina A24-92] (2000)
- The washerwoman's dream: the extraordinary life of Winifred Steger, 1882-1981 (2002)

== Awards ==
- 1966 & 1967 - Grenfell Henry Lawson Festival of Arts - Award for Short Story (as Lindsay Dyson)
- 1970 - Society of Women Writers (Australia) - Award for Short Story - winner for 'The Professor's Son'
- 1974 - Member of the Order of the British Empire, for services to literature.
- 1976 - Runner Up, Bronze Swagman Award for Bush Verse (as Lindsay Dyson)
- 1977 - Queen Elizabeth II Silver Jubilee Medal
- 2003 - Fellowship of Australian Writers Walter Stone Award for an Essay - winner for 'In Search of Winifred the Washerwoman'
- 2006 - Medal of the Order of Australia, for Service to Literature and through a range of professional organisations mentoring aspiring writers.

== Recognition ==
- Patron, Henry Lawson Festival, Grenfell
- Fellowship of Australian Writers (FAW) NSW Hilarie Lindsay Young Writers Short Story Competition For Australian School Children
- Fellowship of Australian Writers (FAW) NSW Hilarie Lindsay Young Writers Poetry Competition For Australian School Children
