= Always Afternoon =

- Based on: Always Afternoon by Gwen Kelly
- Written by: David Stevens
- Directed by: David Stevens
- Starring: Tushka Bergen; Jochen Horst; Lisa Harrow; Marshall Napier
- Countries of origin: Australia; West Germany
- Original languages: English; German
- No. of episodes: 4 x 1 hour

Production
- Producer: Henry Crawford
- Budget: $4.3 million

Original release
- Network: SBS
- Release: 7 March – 8 March 1988

Always Afternoon is a 1988 Australian mini series about German internees in Australia, set in 1914 at Trial Bay Gaol in New South Wales. The series was based on a novel by Gwen Kelly and depicts a love story involving an Australian woman and a German violinist. It was a co-production between Germany and Australia.

It inspired a series of paintings by Ross Watson.

== Cast ==
- Tushka Bergen as Frieda Kennon
- Jochen Horst as Franz Muller
- Lisa Harrow as Nancy Kennon
- Marshall Napier as Bill Kennon
- Wynn Roberts as Pastor Jules
- Christopher Mayer as Bob
- Ben Becker as Ernst
- Dieter Kirchlechner as Kurt Schreiber
- Alex Menglet as Hans Weissmuller
- Colette Mann as Doreen
