= Saida Miller Khalifa =

Saida Miller Khalifa is an author and convert to Islam. She was born Sonya Miller in Great Britain and converted in 1959. She met her husband, an Egyptian professor named Yusry Khalifa, a year later after having taken the name Saida. They both went on the Hajj in 1970, three years after moving to Cairo. Saida then published a short narrative of the trip entitled The Fifth Pillar of Islam.

Currently out of print, The Fifth Pillar is reprinted in Michael Wolfe's One Thousand Roads to Mecca.
