= Marjory Fainges =

Australian researcher and historian

Marjory Fainges (née Ratcliffe) (born 15 May 1933) is an Australian researcher and historian on the subject of the Australian toy industry, particularly the commercial manufacture of dolls. She has written sixteen books, lectured internationally, and is a judge of antique, collectible, modern, and artist dolls.

== Early life ==
Marjory was born in Geelong, Victoria and began her schooling there. The family later moved to Wangaratta and her high school years were completed in Melbourne at Coburg High School. Marjory was unable to take up a scholarship to be a teacher when the family moved to Brisbane, Queensland so she undertook commercial studies and obtained office work but with the birth of her children she developed an interest in dolls and toys.

== Personal life ==
In 1953, Marjory married Jim Fainges. They had met at a friends' sister's 21st Birthday Party in late 1949, were engaged in 1951 and married in the Lutwyche Methodist Church, Brisbane. The family which was to include 5 children Lyn, Sue, Ian, Neil and Keith moved to Everton Park, Brisbane where Marjory and Jim worked on many projects together. Jim had his own interests including model railways and designing scale model. From 1973 Jim worked at the Department of Main Roads as a professional Model Maker. He retired in 1989 and died 18 October 2015.

== Career ==
In the 1970s, Marjory's interest in toys and dolls led to the making of glove, rod and marionette puppets by Jim which Marjory and the three boys used in shows under the name Panaroo Puppets. Marjory and Jim collected dolls and toys and operated the business Doll Restoration and Repairs for 25 years until 2002. In 1980 they opened Panaroos Playthings, Dolls & Toy Museum in Windsor, where Marjory was both the owner and curator. It housed the largest such collection in Australia and specialised in Australian produced toys before closing in 1989.

== Publishing ==
In conversations with other doll enthusiasts the topic had arisen of the lack of relevant publications available. Marjory enjoyed research and in 1986 published her first book Australian Dollmakers History through Kangaroo Press. This was the beginning of a long association with this publisher who published the majority of the 16 books written by Marjory through to 2007. Kangaroo Press was run by David and Scilla Rosenberg and although taken over by Simon and Schuster in 1997 they continued to publish as Kangaroo Press.

The photographs used in the books were taken by Marjory unless otherwise acknowledged. For knitting and crochet books the garments were often based on old patterns which sometimes contained errors. Marjory verified and adjusted the patterns to suit the particular doll she was working with. Dollhouses were constructed by Jim who also made the miniature furniture often used in the photographs and he also drafted the clothing patterns.

Marjory published a range of books. There were illustrated knitting and crochet pattern books for dressing dolls, encyclopaedias of dolls from Australia and World Regions, particular types of dolls and toys. Her book Cyclops Toys through the Years encapsulates her work as a researcher and historian as the history of Cyclops Toys also reflects many changes in Australian society. Later she published on CD.

In her knitting and crochet books Marjory gives details and history of the dolls she has used and dresses them in outfits from earlier eras but which are still suitable for modern dolls.

Marjory was approached by Reverie Publishing Company to write a book specifically for the American market on 61/2-9 inch dolls as this size doll was not available in the Australian market. The book was published in 2007 under the title Knit and Crochet for Small Dolls and is still listed by that publisher.

== Memberships ==
In 1976 Marjory together with others who shared the same enthusiasms formed the Brisbane Doll Society Inc. She has variously served as President, Secretary, Editor over the years and is now an Honorary member. Their Facebook pages include an article about Marjorie.

The first United Federation of Doll Clubs Inc in Australia was formed by Marjory and she served several terms as President.

Was elected a Region Director United Federation of Doll Clubs Inc (Region 16- which encompassed the world) in 1999 for a period of 3 years, the first person from outside of North America to do so.

She was the associate editor, Australian Doll Digest 1988–2002.

In 1989 joined Brisbane Miniature Enthusiasts' Association Inc which caters for those interested in scale doll house building, dolls and their settings. She has acted as president, secretary and editor, and is now an honorary member. Marjory's husband Jim was a founder member in 1981.

== Displays/museums ==
In the International Year of the Child 1979 Marjory organised a doll display at Newstead House which became the genesis of Panaroos Playthings, Dolls & Toy Museum.

Approached by the Queensland Arts Council (later known as Artslink) to produce a display of dolls showing the fashions and occupations of Queenslanders from 1900 to 2000. Marjory designed and made clothing for 82 dolls that toured during 2001–2002.

The Queensland Museum holds a collection of 1000 articles in the Fainges Toy Collection which cover the period 1930 to 1970. Marjorys collection includes teddy bears, dolls, cars and trucks, wooden toys, puzzles and board games including many rare examples. Marjory was a Consultant to the Queensland Museum on Dolls and Toys.

The Logan City Historical Museum, in 2014 held an exhibition featuring 120 dolls produced by Marjory which depicted Heritage Through Costumes depicting periods and occupations from 1788 to 1988. The collection was donated to the Logan City Museum and is housed in the Kingston Butter Factory Community Arts Centre.

A collection of 40 Indian dolls from Shankar's International Dolls Museum, Delhi India which were exchanged for 40 dolls made by Marjory and Jim featuring Australian costume over 200 years, have been donated to the Logan City Historical Museum.

Museum Victoria holds the Panaroos Playthings Doll and Toy Museum Collection in its Childhood and Youth collection featuring items made by Australian companies during the 1930s–1950s.

Her publications The Encyclopedia of Australian Dolls and Cyclops Toys through the Years have been used as a source for museum collections.

== Other interests ==
Offers specialist advice to museums Including Queensland Museum and Museum Victoria on items in the collection

Advises Lifeline shops when assistance is needed on the value of dolls.

Assists a Queensland Asthma Foundation op shop with their dolls.

Is The Brisbane Doll Society's phone liaison person and gives free advice over the phone.

Completed an Apprentice Judge course with United Federation of Doll Clubs then accepted by them as a Judge. Became a Modern Doll Judge - particularly in regard to Celluloid Dolls at United Federation of Doll Clubs Conventions (UFDC) each year from around 2004 till 2010.

Judged both Antique and modern dolls. Judged dolls at local doll shows in the 1990s and also when travelling with Jim to shows in New South Wales, Victoria and South Australia as well as Queensland, in the 1990s. Jim was the Travelling Doll Doctor, while Marjorie gave free Identification and Valuation services

== Bibliography ==
=== Books ===
- Australian Dollmakers - a History ISBN 0 86417 106 4
- Australian Costume for Teen Dolls 1788–1998 ISBN 0-86417-174-9
- Antique dolls of China and Bisque ISBN 0864174055
- The Encyclopaedia of Australian Dolls ISBN 0864175493
- The Encyclopaedia of Regional Dolls of the World ISBN 0-86417-595-7
- Classic Knits for Boy Dolls ISBN 0-86417-717-8
- Classic Knits for Baby Dolls ISBN 0-86417-811-5
- Cyclops Toys through the Years : Australia's Childhood Icon ISBN 0-86417-832-8
- Classic Gollies to Knit, Sew and Crochet ISBN 0-86417-940-5
- Classic Knits for Girl Dolls ISBN 0-86417-948-0
- Celluloid Dolls of the World ISBN 0-7318-0791X
- Australian Hard Plastic Dolls – Price, Guide, Care and Identification ISBN 0-646-41368-6
- Classic Twosomes for Girl and Boy Dolls ISBN 0-7318-0924-6
- Classic Crochet for Baby Dolls ISBN 0-7318-1089-9
- More Classic Knits for Baby Dolls ISBN 0-7318-1203-4
- Knit and Crochet for Small Dolls ISBN 978-1932485479

=== CDs ===
- Australian Dolls of Yesterday and Today ISBN 0646-43469-1
- Pedal Cars in Australia ISBN 0-646-44675-4
- Dolls of the World - Miniature Ambassadors ISBN 0-9806-5100-X
