= Beverley Bergen =

New Zealand opera singer

Beverley Bergen (born 1940) is a New Zealand soprano opera singer and concert performer who was born in Dunedin and began her singing studies while a student at the University of Otago.

== Career ==
She worked first as a television presenter and broadcaster for the New Zealand Broadcasting Corporation before moving to Australia and an appointment as a news anchor for ABC-TV in Sydney under her former married name of Beverley Bohan, while continuing musical studies at the Sydney Conservatorium of Music.

In 1963 she was awarded a scholarship to the London Opera Centre and in 1966 won first prize in a Royal Overseas League competition which was the launchpad for her performing career under the professional name of Beverley Bergen. The following years saw her in roles with Glyndebourne Festival Opera, Sadler's Wells and Welsh National Opera. She also performed many concerts in the UK and throughout Europe.

In 1973, Bergen returned to New Zealand to sing the title role in Lucia di Lammermoor with New Zealand Opera and sang a series of concerts with the New Zealand Symphony Orchestra.

Back in Europe she became a member of Deutsche Opera Berlin and guested at numerous European houses, including Brussels, Munich and Dusseldorf as well as giving solo concert performances with the Berlin Philharmonic Orchestra – notably in their Jubilee performances of the Verdi Requiem. At this time she also recorded with the Berlin Radio Symphony Orchestra.

After returning to Australasia to make her permanent home in Sydney she was engaged by Opera Australia, State Opera South Australia, the New Zealand Symphony Orchestra and the Sydney Symphony Orchestra. Performances included Australasian premieres of Shostakovich’s Lady Macbeth of Mstensk for the 1984 Adelaide Festival and Strauss’s Capriccio and Schoenberg’s Erwartung for the Sydney Festival. She toured for the ABC, and toured to Holland with the Australian Chamber Orchestra premiering Barry Cunningham’s Bennelong for the Australian Bicentenary in 1988.

Bergen’s repertoire includes more than 30 operas and widely diverse concert programmes.

Operatic highlights include La Traviata, La Boheme, Madama Butterfly, The Turn of the Screw, Jenufa, The Flying Dutchman, Julius Cesar, La Forza del Destino and Die Fledermaus. Television opera performances include The Marriage of Figaro for UK Channel 4, Pelleas and Melisande and The Gondoliers for the BBC, La Boheme and L’Heur Espagnole for ABC-TV.

Bergen has held teaching appointments at the Sydney Conservatorium and Wollongong University in Australia and York University in the UK, and has appeared as a judge on international panels for both composition and performance.

After retiring from performance, in 2000 she created, produced and hosted an eight-part lifestyle series, Aria and Pasta, for Bravo Channel in the US, interviewing major opera stars across the world. The series was broadcast internationally.

== Personal life ==
Now married to Dr Alistair Gordon and living in Sydney, she has one daughter Tushka Bergen with former husband Anthony Hose. Her daughter was born in London, England in 1969 during the time she lived in Britain.
