= Jane Winifred Steger =

Australian writer and pioneer (1882–1981)

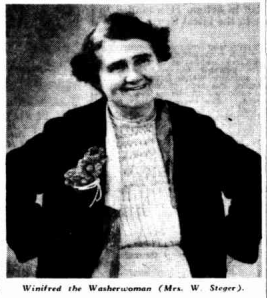
Jane Winifred Steger as photographer by The Mail (Adelaide) in 1941

Jane Winifred Steger (15 November 1882 – 16 March 1981), a.k.a. Winifred the Washerwoman, Bebe Zatoon was an Australian author and pioneer of South Australia who spent much of her life involved with the Afghan cameleers in Australia through her relationships with Ali Ackba Nuby and Karum Bux.

== Biography ==
Steger was born on 15 November 1882 in Lambeth, London, the daughter of house-painter Wilfred Isaac Oaten and Lousia Dennis. In 1891 father and daughter migrated to Australia and it is said that her mother, Louisa, walked off the ship before it sailed and never saw her daughter again.

Father and daughter settled in the Darling Downs in Queensland where they took up unprofitable land, that was infested with Prickly pears, and they experienced severe hardship. Due to their poverty Steger started working at a young age as a nursemaid and, later, as a 'skivvy' (maid).

After falling pregnant to Charles Steger, an itinerant shearer, at 16 the couple married on 7 December 1899 at the St John's Church of England in Dalby, Queensland. The couple had 4 children together before, after being threatened by her husband with a gun, she left him and travelled to Western Queensland. Steger was given no choice but to leave her children behind and interviews with Stegar and her children describe Charles Steger as "rough, rude, drunken and violent".

Steger worked as a barmaid for 7 years before meeting Ali Ackba Nuby when they were both working at Mungallala, Steger at the hotel and Nuby running a general store in another, disused, hotel. Steger called Nuby an 'Indian Hawker' and the two formed a romantic relationship and would go on to have 3 children together. During their relationship Steger converted to Islam.

Throughout their time together the family lived a nomadic life and worked as camel-drivers in Central Australia, initially based in the South Australian towns of Marree and Oodnadatta. In both towns Steger and her family lived in the Ghan Towns, established outside of the main settlements for Afghan cameleers. Steger had a special place in the communities there as, pressed into unwilling service by Nuby, she assisted with the translation of consignment notes and bills of landing as many of the cameleers could not read English.

Around 1923–1924 Nuby died in a cholera outbreak in his home village when visiting India to help his family and, upon hearing the news, months after events and already struggling from the financial aspects of her husband's loss, Steger was shocked to learn she had no claim to his estate as the two were never formally married. Steger tried to find full-time work, preferably live-in, but all that she could find was work as a washerwoman and, to reduce expenses, she moved into a hostel but with no form of pension or benefits available she struggled significantly.

Finding this situation untenable Steger allowed the unofficial Mullah of the Oodnadatta Mosque, who had offered to find her a husband the day that Nuby died, to finally do so. Steger married Karum Bux (Karam Bakhsh) on 26 January 1925 at the mosque, a marriage that was never registered and at which Steger did not even attend the ceremony.

In 1927 the pair travelled to Mecca and, upon her return, she wrote a series of articles about the trip, under the pseudonym Bebe Zatoon. These articles, entitled 'Arabian Days; the Wanderings of Winifred the Washerwoman', ran in The Observer from 8 December 1928 to 2 February 1929. These articles drew a lot of attention, with many people wondering about the real identity of the author. Some of these articles were later included in One Thousand Roads to Mecca; a collection of travel writing.

Steger separated from Bux in November 1928, ending their marriage of convenience, after receiving an invitation to become governess to the family of King Amanullah Khan, the royal family of Afghanistan. However, by the time she arrived in India with her 3 children to Nuby, the king had been overthrown and she travelled with a medical team to the border and helped escort Queen Souriya back to Bombay. Following these adventures Steger returned to South Australia where she continued to write (works listed below); she was a self-proclaimed 'compulsive writer'.

During World War II Steger ran a mess for miners in the Northern territory town of Tennant Creek where she kept goats to provide milk and meat. After the war Steger moved to Alice Springs where she managed a poultry farm. In 1952 Steger saw her eldest son, who she had not seen since 1909, who came to Alice Springs to tell her that Charles Steger, who had always refused to divorce her, had died.

In 1969 Steger published her 'autobiography' Always Bells: Life with Ali, but quickly had to re-release it as a novel as it contained many inaccuracies, including claiming that she was born in China and raised in a convent.

She continued writing into her late 90s until, following a fall, her typewriter was taken away, and she died in the Adelaide suburb of Campbelltown on 16 March 1981.

She was just 9 months short of her 100th birthday which she had celebrated 3 years before, with much fanfare, including a message from Queen Elizabeth.

== Works ==
- Horrors of the Night Winifred the Washerwoman, 1935 short story
- Unto Us A Child Is Born Winifred the Washerwoman, 1935 column
- The Severest Test Winifred the Washerwoman, 1935 column
- Four Rings on her Fingers Winifred Steger, 1963 novel
- Jack's Jane : The Story of a Farmer's Wife who Goes On Strike Winifred Steger, 1965 novel
- The Door That Loved Winifred Steger, 1965 novel
- Always Bells : Life With Ali Winifred Steger, 1928 autobiography (this was oublished with the surname Stegar)
- Sweet Wee Jimmy Jamesy Winifred Steger, 1972 short story
- Ere's One you Nebbe 'Ad Winifred Steger, 1974 short story
- Different Gods (from : 'The Magnolia Queen', An Unpublished Novel) Winifred Steger, 1977 extract novel
- Soap Bubbles Winifred Steger, 1981 short story

== Works About ==
- The Washerwoman's Dream by Hilarie Lindsay
