= The Working Poor =

2004 book by David K. Shipler

The Working Poor: Invisible in America
- Author: David K. Shipler
- Subject: Sociology
- Genre: Non-fiction
- Publisher: Knopf
- Publication date: 2004
- Media type: Print (hardcover and paperback)
- Pages: 336
- ISBN: 9780375708213
- Preceded by: A Country of Strangers: Blacks and Whites in America
- Followed by: The Rights of the People: How Our Search for Safety Invades Our Liberties

The Working Poor: Invisible in America is a 2004 book written by Pulitzer Prize-winner David K. Shipler. From personal interviews and research, Shipler presents in this book anecdotes and life stories of individuals considered the working poor. Using their lives as examples, he illustrates the struggles the working poor face while attempting to escape poverty. Throughout the book, the author describes numerous economic issues preventing the working poor from escaping poverty.

Shipler explores some flaws of comparative advantages. One case is illustrated by clothing companies who hire contractors that hire illegal immigrants. The contractors pay employees below the minimum wage to work in low quality sweatshops for hours, exceeding the legal limit.

The New York Times review stated, "Mr. Shipler avoids saying anything too controversial and as a result his book seems unlikely to change minds on either the left or the right. ... Nonetheless, by exposing the wretched condition of these invisible Americans, he has performed a noble and badly needed service." The San Francisco Chronicle reviewer wrote, "Shipler is informative, sometimes outraged, and often eloquent in rendering the working poor visible", but also noted that "the author appears to hope for good will from above, within the system, to carry out his suggestions."
