= Tushka Bergen =

Australian actress

Tushka Bergen (born 1969, in London, England) is an Australian actress who has worked in Australia, England, Germany and the United States. In 1988, she was nominated for the AACTA Award for Best Performance by an Actress in a Mini Series for her role in Always Afternoon.

Her mother is New Zealander Beverley Bergen, a soprano opera singer and scriptwriter. Her father is Anthony Hose, a conductor and pianist. She is married to CNN International presenter John Vause, with whom she has one daughter, Katie Vause, born in 2004.

== Filmography ==
=== Film ===
Title	Year	Role	Type
1984	A Girl's Own Story	School Girl (as Tushka Hose)	Film short
1985	Mad Max III: Beyond Thunderdome	Guardian (as Tushka Hose)	Feature film
1987	The Place at the Coast	Ellie McAdam	Feature film
1987	Damsels be Damned		Film short
1989	Minnamurra (aka Outback, Wrangler)	Alice May Richards	Feature film
1993	Swing Kids	Evey	Feature film, US
1994	Barcelona	Montserrat Raventos	Feature film, US
1995	Voices	Lily Buxton	Feature film
1996	Turning April	April	Feature film
1997	Lovelife	Helene	Feature film, US
1997	Culture		Film Short, US
1998	Hurrah	Laura	Feature film
1999	The Cherry Orchard	Anya	Feature film
2003	Horseplay	Alicia Coxhead	Feature film

=== Television ===
Title	Year	Role	Type
1981	Don Quixote's Children (aka Don Quichottes Kinder)	Babette (as Tushka Benthaak)	TV film, WEST GERMANY
1985	Sons and Daughters	Recurring role: Denise Turner (as Tushka Hose)	TV series, season 4, 9 episodes
1986	Hector's Bunyip	Pandora Bailey (as Tushka Hose)	TV film
1987	Always Afternoon	Lead role: Frieda Kennon	TV miniseries, 4 episodes
1989	Tanamera – Lion Of Singapore	Recurring role: Natasha	TV miniseries UK/AUSTRALIA, 7 episodes
1989	Derrick	Guest role: Libeta Hinz	TV series, WEST GERMANY, 1 episode
1990	Bergerac	Guest role: Alice	TV series, UK/AUSTRALIA, 1 episode
1990	Der Alte	Recurring role: Martina Hinz	TV series, WEST GERMANY, 2 episodes
1990	Blaues Blut	Guest role: Greta Arnold	TV series UK/WEST GERMANY, 1 episode
1991	Das Traumschiff	Guest role: Julia Kirst	TV series WEST GERMANY/AUSTRIA
1992	Ein Fall fur zwei	Guest role: Gaby Renders	TV series, WEST GERMANY, 1 episode
1992	Der Bergdoktor	Guest role: Sonja Stelzer	TV series, GERMANY, 1 episode
1993	Poirot	Guest role: Susan Cardwell (as Tushka Bergen)	TV series, UK, 1 episode
1993	Gluckliche Reise	Guest role: Babsie	TV series, GERMANY, 1 episode
1994	Northern Exposure	Guest role: Anastasia Nikolaevna Romanov	TV series, US, 1 episode
1995	Murderous Intent	Colleen	TV film, US
1997	The Single Guy	Guest role: Lisa	TV series, US, 1 episode
1997	The Big Easy	Guest role: Mariel Rigg	TV series, UK/US, 1 episode
1998	Fantasy Island	Guest role: Miranda	TV series, US, 1 episode
1999	Invisible Child	Support role: Gillian	TV film, US
1999	Journey to the Center of the Earth	Recurring role: Alice Hastings	TV miniseries, US, 2 episodes
1999	Angel	Guest role: Melissa Burns	TV series, US, 1 episode
2000	The Others	Guest role: Mary Jane Kelly	TV series, US, 1 episode
2000	FreakyLinks	Guest role: Julie Marish	TV series, US, 1 episode
2000; 2001	Frasier	Recurring Guest role: Miranda Rogers	TV series, US, 2 episodes
2001	Bye Bye Baby	Lead role: Anna	TV film, UK
2001	Fur alle Falle Stefanie	Guest role: Sibylle Buser	TV series, GERMANY, 1 episode
2002	Strong Medicine	Guest role: Emily	TV series, US, 1 episode
2002	The Agency	Guest role: Gretchen	TV series, CANADA/US, 1 episode
2002	CSI: Crime Scene Investigation	Guest role: Samantha Dean	TV series, US/CANADA, 1 episode
2002	Georgetown	Guest role	TV film, US
2007	Made in China	Recurring role: Wife	TV film documentary, US
2020	Metropolitan 30th Anniversary & Barcelona 25th Anniversary Reunions	Herself	Video

== Awards and nominations ==
Year	Award	Category	Title of work	Result
1988	AACTA Award	Best Performance by an Actress in a Mini Series	Always Afternoon	Nominated
