= Alex Kronemer =

American writer, lecturer, and documentary filmmaker

Alexander Kronemer (born 19 June 1960, Pennsylvania, United States) is an American writer, lecturer, and documentary filmmaker whose work focuses on religious diversity, Islam, and cross-cultural understanding. He is the co-founder and executive producer of Unity Productions Foundation. Alex Kronemer is the co-founder of Unity Productions Foundation (UPF), its executive director, and Executive Producer for all UPF Films. He is an internationally known speaker and has published numerous articles newspapers and journals in the US and abroad, including The Washington Post, Christian Science Monitor, the Huffington Post and in syndication in international publications as widespread as the UK, Indonesia, Egypt, and Pakistan. He frequently presents at 20,000 Dialogue events, and has appeared as a CNN commentator on several occasions. Mr. Kronemer has won numerous awards for his work in promoting peace and interfaith understanding. A graduate of Harvard Divinity School, he previously served in the U.S. Department of State's Bureau of Human Rights and was one of the founding staff members who helped establish the U.S. Institute of Peace.

== Education ==
Kronemer received his Bachelor of Arts in International Relations and Economics from American University, Washington, D.C. He graduated Magna cum laude in 1982, and was honored with the "Most Outstanding Undergraduate Scholar" award. Three years later, Kronemer pursued a master's degree in Theological Studies from Harvard University. At Harvard, he concentrated in the philosophy of religion and comparative religion, graduating in 1985.

== Lecturer and commentator ==
As a lecturer, Kronemer has delivered talks on religious diversity and Islam for the U.S. Departments of Justice, State, FBI, the World Affairs Council and the National Council on U.S.-Arab Relations. Kronemer has also spoken at many universities including University of Pennsylvania, Harvard, Cornell University, Yale University, Princeton University, and Penn State, and has addressed private corporations such as Nike, Aetna, and Walt Disney World.

Kronemer made several appearances as a CNN commentator most notably during the network's coverage of Hajj in 1998, which was broadcast to 400 million viewers. He has been interviewed by prominent radio networks such as NPR and Voice of America.

Kronemer was Executive Producer of The Noor Inayat Khan Story - Enemy of The Reich, which was produced by Unity Productions Foundation (UPF). The documentary is based on Noor's life. The world premiere was on 15 Feb 2014 in Washington DC.

== Career ==
In the summer of 1999, Kronemer began serving as the Middle East Desk Officer for the Office of Democracy, Human Rights, and Labor for the State Department. He served appointed as the US Delegate to the United Nations Human Rights Commission in Geneva, Switzerland and briefed senior State Department and White House Officials on issues related to Islam. Kronemer was awarded a commendation for organizing the first State Department "Iftar Dinner" that was hosted by former Secretary of State Madeleine Albright.

After working with refugees for three years, from November 1989 to May 1999 Kronemer worked in the US Department of Labor, where he worked for ten years performing economic research. He prepared reports and briefings for the Commissioner for the Bureau of Labor Statistics. Kronemer also facilitated and led various project teams including one that insured the department's readiness for Y2K.

Upon completing his master's degree, from August 1986 to June 1989 Kronemer took a position with the Refugee Education and Employment Program, where he directed the training and job placement services for newly arrived Vietnamese, Cambodian, and former Soviet Union refugees. In an article published by Christian Science in 2003, Kronemer describes his motives for having accepted the post by stating how, "It was my moral duty to do what others had failed to do..."

== Filmography ==
Muhammad: Legacy of a Prophet – August 2002

- Domestic reviews–PBS National Broadcast
- International reviews–National Geographic International, Nile TV, SBS Australia, Danish Television, NPO Netherlands, Medi1sat Morocco, History Channel Spain, National Geographic Asia
- Awards–ine Special Jury Award- 2004, Marharba Special Prize - 2005
- Domestic reviews–PBS National Broadcast,
- International reviews–Al Arabiya, SBS Australia, ZDF Germany, YLE Finland, Al Jazeera, History Channel Spain, SRL Italy
- Awards–"Gold" Intermedia- Globe; Hamburg World Media Film Festival- 2008, "Best Documentary"; ITV/ADC Peer Award, Documentary over 30 Minutes- 2008, "Grand Goldie Film Award"; For Excellence in Film- 2007
- Domestic reviews–PBS National Broadcast
- International reviews–Al Jazeera, Al Arabiya
- Live Screenings:
  - 2007–Cincinnati, Dayton, New Brunswick, NJ, Chicago, Detroit, Charleston, WV, Philadelphia, Raleigh, NC, Dallas, San Francisco, Washington, DC, Indianapolis
  - 2008–Boston, Miami, Las Vegas, New York, Philadelphia, Tampa, Houston
- Film Festivals:American Black Film Festival – October 2007
- Awards–"Gold" Intermedia-Globe; Hamburg World Media Festival- 2008, Telly Award- 2008, "Best Documentary"- American Black Film Festival- 2007, Cine Golden Eagle- 2007, Grand Goldie Film Award- For Excellence in Film- 2007
- Domestic reviews–PBS through American Public Television
- Film Festivals: Official Selection - Seattle Film Festival, Official Selection - Globians Film Festival, Official Selection –Atlanta Film Festival
- International reviews–YLE Finland
- Awards–"Silver" Intermedia-Globe; Hamburg World Media Film Festival- 2008, Telly Award- 2008, Cine Golden Eagle Award- 2007, Grand Goldie Film Award, For Excellence in Film - 2007
- Domestic activity–Commercial release through Truly Indie and Landmark Films – October 2008
- Domestic–Executive Program Services – June 2009
- Domestic–Executive Program Services – January 2010
- International–Al Arabiya – September 2009
- Screenings:
  - World Premiere –Georgetown University – June 3, 2009 – Keynote Address by Former Secretary of State Madeleine Albright.
- Awards–Cine Golden Eagle Award- 2009, Grand Goldie Film Award, For Excellence in Film - 2009

Islamic Art: Mirror of the Invisible World - July 2012

- Domestic reviews–PBS - July 7, 2012
- International reviews–Al Hura

Enemy of The Reich: The Noor Inayat Khan Story - September 2014

- Domestic reviews–PBS - September 2014

The Sultan and The Saint - December 2016

- Domestic reviews–PBS - December 2017
- Nominated for Best Lighting Direction and Production Design at the 39th News and Documentary Emmy Awards.

=== Grants ===
Kronemer's work has been supported by numerous grants, including the World Economic Forum, the U.S. Institute of Peace, the Corporation for Public Broadcasting, the Montgomery County Commission on the Humanities and a Halberstam Writing Fellowship:

- The Doris Duke Charitable Foundation–outreach funding – 20,000 dialogues – 2009, 2008
- The El-Hibri Charitable Foundation production funding for Inside Islam – 2009, Prince among slaves – 2006, Cities of Light – 2004, Muhammad: Legacy of a Prophet – 2002
- One Nation, a special project of the Rockefeller Philanthropy Advisors–outreach funding – 20,000 Dialogues – 2008, production funding – Allah made me funny – 2007, Talking through – 2007, On a wing and a Prayer – 2007.
- U.S. Institute of Peace–Companion website – Cities of light – 2007.
- The Corporation for Public Broadcasting–production funding: Cities of Light – 2006, Muhammad: Legacy of a Prophet – 2004
- The National Endowment for the Humanities–production funding: Prince among slaves – 2006, 2005, Research and development – Prince among slaves – 2004, 2003.
- The National Black Programming Consortium–production funding – Prince among slaves – 2005.
- The David and Lucille Packard Foundation–production funding – Muhammad: Legacy of a Prophet – 2002
- Carnegie Corporation–joint outreach project on Muhammad: Legacy of a prophet and Muslims

== Publications ==
Kronemer has published in newspapers and journals, including The Southern Quarterly, The Christian Science Monitor, the Los Angeles Times, the San Jose Mercury News, Beliefnet.com, and The Washington Post. His articles have been included in several anthologies, including the September 11 memorial book, Up From the Ashes (2001) and Wilber Prize winner, Taking Back Islam (2002).

- "Decoupling Crime and Identity after 9/11" - syndicated through Common Ground News Service, September 2011. Reprinted in several Pakistani newspapers including: The Daily Abtak, The Daily Aftab, Daily Gulf News, Takmeel Pakistan and Al Oamar.
- "What Islamists and Islamaphobes don't want you to know - OnFaith". OnFaith. 2009-11-20. Archived from the original on 2018-09-21.
- Kronemer, Alexander (2009-07-04). "Obama's Cairo Speech: It's a Rorschach Test, But It Doesn't Have to Be". Huffington Post.
- "Islamic Spain: History's refrain". Christian Science Monitor. 2007-08-22. ISSN 0882-7729.
- "Prince Among Slaves: A Documentary Film Project" (PDF). Southern Quarterly. 2007. Archived from the original (PDF) on 2018-09-21.
- Passion Transformation," Belief Net, March 10, 2004
- "A personal Saigon - of superiority - falls". Christian Science Monitor. 2003-10-16. ISSN 0882-7729.
- Wolfe, Michael (2004-08-16). Taking Back Islam: American Muslims Reclaim Their Faith. Rodale. ISBN 9781579549886.
- "Understanding Muhammad". Christian Science Monitor. 2002-12-09. ISSN 0882-7729.
- "Aung San Suu Kyi Speaks to Young America". Christian Science Monitor. 1997-06-09. ISSN 0882-7729.\* "The Bible as a Model for Democracy". Christian Science Monitor. 1997-01-28. ISSN 0882-7729.
- "THE BEST DAYS OF OUR LIVES". Washington Post. 1996-05-10. ISSN 0190-8286.
- Of Fathers and Sons: Through My Own Boys, Finding the Love I Missed Out On, Washington Post. June 10, 1997.
- Steel Towns Face Anxiety, Pittsburgh Post-Gazette. Jan. 22, 1995.
- What Muhammad Would Say About Terrorism Beliefnet.com.
- Other articles by Alex Kronemer
