= Hurrah (film) =

- Directed by: Frank Shields
- Based on: novel Bitter's End by David Owen
- Starring: Martin Csokas; Tushka Bergen
- Release date: 1998
- Country: Australia
- Language: English

Hurrah is a 1998 Australian film directed by Frank Shields about a man living on his own in an isolated farm property who is visited by a mysterious woman.

== Cast ==
- Martin Csokas as Raoul
- Tushka Bergen as Laura
- Andrew Blackman as Emerson
