= Islam: Empire of Faith =

- DVD cover
- Written by: Jonathan Grupper
- Directed by: Robert H. Gardner
- Starring: Ben Kingsley (narrator)
- Music by: Leonard Lionnet
- Original language: English

Production
- Cinematography: Regis Becker
- Editors: David Grossbach; Christopher Schultz
- Running time: 240 minutes

Original release
- Network: PBS
- Release: 2000

Islam: Empire of Faith is a documentary series, made in 2000, that details the history of Islam, from the birth of the Islamic prophet, Muhammad to the Ottoman Empire. It is narrated by Ben Kingsley and is available as three DVDs or two video volumes in NTSC format.

The first episode deals with the life of Muhammad, the second with the early Caliphates, Crusades, and Mongol invasion, and the third with the Ottoman Empire and Safavid dynasty.

Boston College professors Jonathan Bloom and Sheila Blair served as consultants for the series.

== See also ==
- List of Islamic films
- List of films about the Prophet Muhammad
