= Robert H. Gardner =

American filmmaker

Robert Gardner
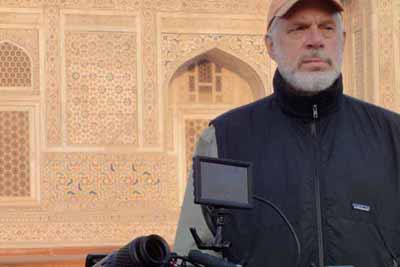
- Born: June 3, 1947 (age 79); Berkeley, California
- Occupations: filmmaker, director, producer

Robert H. Gardner (born, June 3, 1947, in Berkeley, California) is an American documentary filmmaker, producer and director of The Courage to Care, Egypt: Quest for Immortality, Arab and Jew: Wounded Spirits in a Promised Land, National Geographic Explorer series; Search for the Lost Ark, Tiwanaku, and Desert Warriors; The History Channel series Barbarians, Barbarians II, and Rome: Rise and Fall of an Empire. In 2001 his series Islam: Empire of Faith aired on PBS, as did Islamic Art: Mirror of the Invisible World in 2012.

As of 2014, Gardner had won three Emmy Awards and had been nominated for one Academy Award.

== Biography ==
He began working in 1967 in Washington, D.C., as a camera and editing assistant for Eli Productions, producing social issue documentaries for the experimental television show, Public Broadcast Laboratory, on NET, the precursor to PBS. In 1968 he was part of the documentary crew covering the presidential campaign of Hubert Humphrey. He directed and edited children’s television series for Northern Virginia Educational Television in the 1970s and was Senior Producer for Special Projects at The United Way of America from 1982-1985. In 1986 he founded Gardner Films Inc., an independent production company.

== Filmography ==
- Madeleine: The Noor Inayat Khan Story (2014)
- Sisters (2013)
- Islamic Art: Mirror of the Invisible World (2012)
- Inside Islam: What a Billion Muslims Really Think (2010)
- Rome: Rise and fall of an empire (2008)
- Cities of Light; The Rise and Fall of Islamic Spain (2007)
- Barbarians I, Barbarians II (2002-2007)
- Da Vinci and the Code He Lived By (2006)
- The Plague ( 2005)
- Elie Wiesel: First Person Singular (2001)
- Arab and Jew: Return to the Promised Land (2001)
- Islam: Empire of Faith (2001)
- NOVA: Warnings From the Ice (1997)
- Egypt: Quest for Immortality (1996)
- Mesopotamia: Return to Eden (1996)
- Arab and Jew: Wounded Spirits in a Promised Land (1989)
- The Courage to Care (1985)
