= Hostage (1983 film) =

- DVD cover
- Directed by: Frank Shields
- Screenplay by: Frank Shields; John Lind
- Based on: Hostage by Christine Maresch
- Produced by: Frank Shields
- Starring: Kerry Mack; Ralph Schicha
- Cinematography: Vince Monton
- Edited by: Don Saunders
- Music by: Davood A. Tabrizi
- Production companies: Frontier Films; Klejazz Productions
- Distributed by: Roadshow Film Distributors
- Release date: 5 May 1983
- Running time: 93 minutes
- Countries: Australia; West Germany
- Languages: English; German
- Box office: AU$2.455 million (Australia)

Hostage (also known as Savage Attraction) (German: Hölle der Gewalt) is a 1983 Australian-West German crime film based on a true story. Christine Maresch reverted to her maiden name Christine O'Neill and died of hypothermia in April 2023.

== Plot synopsis ==
Based on actual events, Christine Lewis is a teenager living in Wollongong in the 1970s and ends up marrying a sadistic German bank robber named Walter Maresch.

== Cast ==
- Kerry Mack as Christine Maresch
- Ralph Schicha as Walter Maresch
- Michael Harrs as John Hoffman
- Clare Binney as Freda Hoffman
- Doris Goddard as Mrs. Hoffman
- Judy Nunn as Mrs. Lewis
- Henk Johannes as Wolfgang
- Burt Cooper as Helmut
- Ian Mortimer as Gary
- The Shamoroze family
