= The Courage to Care =

1985 film

- Directed by: Robert H. Gardner
- Produced by: Robert H. Gardner, Carol Rittner
- Cinematography: Tony Cutrono
- Production companies: United Way Productions, Mutual of America
- Distributed by: United States Holocaust Memorial Council
- Release date: 1985
- Country: United States
- Language: English

The Courage to Care is a 1985 American short documentary film directed by Robert H. Gardner and produced by Carol Rittner about non-Jews who rescued Jews during the Holocaust. It was nominated for an Academy Award for Best Documentary (Short Subject). Rittner wrote a book of the same name as a companion volume to the film, which also includes the personal narratives of the same persons in the film and many others.
