= David K. Shipler =

American author (born 1942)

David Shipler
- Born: December 3, 1942 (age 83); Chatham, New Jersey, U.S.
- Education: Dartmouth College (BA)
- Occupations: Author, journalist, educator
- Spouse: Deborah I. Shipler
- Children: 3
- Website: The Shipler Report

David K. Shipler (born December 3, 1942) is an American author and journalist. He won the Pulitzer Prize for General Nonfiction in 1987 for Arab and Jew: Wounded Spirits in a Promised Land. Among his other publications the book entitled, The Working Poor: Invisible in America, also has garnered many awards. Formerly, he was a foreign correspondent of The New York Times and served as one of their bureau chiefs. He taught at many colleges and universities. Since 2010, he has published the electronic journal, The Shipler Report. He began co-hosting the podcast, Two Reporters in 2021. A collection of his poems was published in 2023.

== Early life and education ==
Shipler was born and grew up in Chatham, New Jersey. His mother, Eleanor Karr Shipler, taught English and upon her death, her family established the Eleanor Shipler English Award that is granted to persistent students. His grandfather, Edmund J. Karr, was a Manhattan businessman.

Shipler attended Dartmouth College, graduating in 1964; He served in the U.S. Navy as an officer on a destroyer, 1964–66.

== Professional work ==
Shipler joined The New York Times as a news clerk in 1966. He was promoted to city staff reporter in 1968. He covered housing, poverty, and politics and he won awards from the American Political Science Association, the New York Newspaper Guild, and other organizations.

During 1973–75 he served as a New York Times correspondent in Saigon, covering South Vietnam, Cambodia, Laos, and Thailand. He also reported from Burma.

In 1975, Shipler spent a semester at the Russian Institute of Columbia University studying the Russian language, Soviet politics, economics, and history in order to prepare for assignment in Moscow. He served as correspondent in The New York Times Moscow Bureau for four years, 1975–79, and as Moscow bureau chief from 1977 to 1979. He wrote the best-seller Russia: Broken Idols, Solemn Dreams, which was published in 1983 and updated in 1989. The book won the Overseas Press Club Award in 1983 as the best book that year on foreign affairs.

From 1979 to 1984, Shipler served as bureau chief of The New York Times in Jerusalem. He was co-recipient (with Thomas Friedman) of the 1983 George Polk Award for covering the 1982 Lebanon War. At the end of his period in Israel he was reprimanded by the director of the Israeli government's press office for breaking military censorship rules by publishing a report about a bus hijacking after which two captured hijackers were killed.

He spent a year, 1984–85, as a visiting scholar at the Brookings Institution in Washington, D.C. to write Arab and Jew: Wounded Spirits in a Promised Land, which explores the mutual perceptions and relationships between Arabs and Jews in Israel and the West Bank. The book won the 1987 Pulitzer Prize for General Nonfiction and was extensively revised and updated in 2002. He was executive producer, writer, and narrator of a two-hour PBS documentary on Arab and Jew, which won a 1990 Dupont-Columbia award for broadcast journalism, and of a one-hour film, "Arab and Jew: Return to the Promised Land", which aired on PBS during August 2002.

Shipler served as Chief Diplomatic Correspondent in the Washington Bureau of The New York Times until 1988. From 1988 to 1990, he was a senior associate at the Carnegie Endowment for International Peace, writing on transitions to democracy in Russia and Eastern Europe for The New Yorker and other publications.

=== Other published works ===
His book, A Country of Strangers: Blacks and Whites in America, based on five years of research into stereotyping and interactions across racial lines, was published in 1997. Shipler was one of three authors invited by President Clinton to participate in his first town meeting on race.

His book, The Working Poor: Invisible in America, was a national best-seller in 2004 and 2005. It was a finalist for the 2005 National Book Critics Circle Award and the New York Public Library Helen Bernstein Award. It won an Outstanding Book Award from The Myers Center for the Study of Bigotry and Human Rights at Simmons College and led to awards from the National Law Center on Homelessness and Poverty, the New York Labor Communications Council, and the Washington, D.C. Employment Justice Center.

Later works include three books on civil liberties: The Rights of the People: How Our Search for Safety Invades Our Liberties, published in 2011; Rights at Risk: The Limits of Liberty in Today's America, published in 2012; and Freedom of Speech: Mightier Than the Sword, published in 2015.

The Shipler Report, "A Journal of Fact and Opinion" is an electronic journal that has been published by Shipler since 2010. The journal is available by subscription through e-mail. An archive is maintained of the content of the blog, which has an extensive searchable index by subjects.

As a contributing writer, essays by Shipler appear in the Washington Monthly. Since April 2021, Daniel Zwerdling and he host on their podcast, Two Reporters - Shipler and Zwerdling where they "interview stellar guests... examine problems and possible solutions... [and] just fascinating stuff."

On November 15, 2023, Stone Lantern Books published The Wind is Invisible: And Other Poems by Shipler. It is dedicated to his wife and features poems inspired by her and her family tradition of presenting poems on special occasions in their lives, as well as, having one of her photographs for its cover. The collection celebrates life and Nature.

In April 2025, he published a novel set at the end of the Vietnam War, The Interpreter, through Green City Books.

== Other awards and honors ==
Beside the awards and prizes noted above, Shipler has received a Martin Luther King Jr. Social Justice Award from Dartmouth and the following honorary degrees: Doctor of Letters from Middlebury College and from Glassboro State College (New Jersey), Doctor of Laws from Birmingham-Southern College, and Master of Arts from Dartmouth College, where he served on the board of trustees from 1993 to 2003.

A member of the Pulitzer jury for general nonfiction in 2008, Shipler was its chair in 2009.

Shipler has taught at Princeton University, American University, as writer-in-residence at University of Southern California, as a Woodrow Wilson Fellow on approximately fifteen campuses, and as a Montgomery Fellow and Visiting Professor of Government at Dartmouth.

== Personal life ==
Shipler was married to Deborah Isaacs Shipler until her death from cancer in January 2024. The couple had three children. Her father was Harold Isaacs, who was himself a journalist, and also a professor of political science at the Massachusetts Institute of Technology.

Deborah Shipler was an early childhood educator, family therapist, and photographer. She also took photographs that were published in The New York Times along with David's stories.
