= One Thousand Roads to Mecca =

1999 collection of travel journals edited by Michael Wolfe

- Editor: Michael Wolfe
- Language: English
- Publisher: Grover Press
- Publication date: 1997
- Publication place: United States
- ISBN: 0-8021-3599-4

One Thousand Roads to Mecca: Ten Centuries of Travelers Writing about the Muslim Pilgrimage is a collection of travel journals edited by Michael Wolfe and published in 1999. Covering over 20 accounts made over 10 centuries, this work shows many sides of the Hajj, the Pilgrimage to Mecca required of every able Muslim.

Included are accounts of Naser-e Khosraw, Ibn Jubayr, Ibn Battuta and ultimately the pilgrimage of Michael Wolfe himself.

== Contributors ==
- Naser-e Khosraw, Persia, 1050
- Ibn Jubayr, Spain, 1183–84
- Ibn Battuta, Morocco, 1326
- Ludovico di Varthema, Bologna, 1503
- A Pilgrim with No Name, Italy, 1575
- Joseph Pitts, England, 1685
- Ali Bey al-Abbasi, Spain, 1807
- John Lewis Burckhardt, Switzerland, 1814
- Sir Richard Burton, Great Britain, 1953
- Her Highness Sikandar, the Begum of Bhopal, India, 1864
- John F. Keane, Anglo-India, 1877–78
- Mohammad Hosayn Farahani, Persia, 1885–86
- Arthur J. B. Wavell, Anglo-Africa, 1908
- Eldon Rutter, Great Britain, 1925
- Winifred Stegar, Australia, 1927
- Muhammad Asad, Galicia, 1927
- Harry St. John Philby, Great Britain, 1931
- Lady Evelyn Cobbold, Great Britain, 1933
- Hamza Bogary, Mecca, 1947
- Jalal Al-e Ahmad, Iran, 1964
- Malcolm X, United States, 1964
- Saida Miller Khalifa, Great Britain, 1970
- Michael Wolfe, United States, 1990
