= Frank Shields (director) =

Australian director of film and TV (born 1947)

Frank Shields (born 29 March 1947) is an Australian director of film and TV.

He broke into the film industry in the 1970s by making a film about Breaker Morant which he shot partly in Africa.

== Select Credits ==
- The Breaker (1974) (documentary about Breaker Morant)
- Hostage aka Savage Attraction (1983)
- The Surfer (1986)
- Fatal Sky (1990)
- Hurrah (1998)
- The Finder (2001)
