= Voices (1995 film) =

Film about composer Peter Warlock

- Directed by: Malcolm Clarke
- Written by: Peter Barnes, Nicholas Meyer
- Produced by: Cary Brokaw, Dina De Luca
- Starring: Jeremy Northam; Tushka Bergen; Allan Corduner; Hilton McRae
- Edited by: Jonathan Shaw
- Music by: Elliot Goldenthal
- Production company: Avenue Pictures
- Distributed by: Sony Pictures Classics
- Release date: 1995
- Running time: 92 minutes
- Country: United Kingdom
- Language: English

Voices (released in Canada and the United States as Voices From a Locked Room) is a 1995 psychological drama film loosely based on the life and career of composer Peter Warlock, whose real name was Philip Heseltine. The film stars Jeremy Northam as Warlock and Tushka Bergen as Lily Buxton, his love interest. It was directed by Malcolm Clarke with a screenplay adapted from the book by Mark A. Stuart titled, Double Jeopardy.

== Plot ==
Philip Heseltine (Jeremy Northam) is a music critic in 1930s London. Due to his scathing and often vicious reviews, Heseltine earns himself the nickname: "The Grim Reaper". Focusing almost deliberate attention at British composer Peter Warlock, Heseltine continuously accuses him of plagiarism; which begins to draw the attention and concern from upper management. One evening, while reviewing a cabaret in a local nightclub, Heseltine is drawn to an American singer by the name of Lily Buxton (Tushka Bergen). A relationship ensues. While the two are visiting Heseltine's mother in the country, Buxton is awoken one evening by the sound of someone playing the piano. When she questions Mrs. Heseltine the next morning, Mrs. Heseltine says that she does not play and Philip has not played since he was small. Upon returning to London, Philip informs Lily that he is going out of town for a few days. When they arrive back at Heseltine's flat, there is a note on the door. They discover that the gas has been left on inside, killing all the pet cats. Philip immediately says that Warlock must have done it. Lily reads the note and questions Philip as to how Warlock could have known what he said about him at a party. Upon suspicion, she seeks out Philip's friend Gerald Duffy at his houseboat. He is not home so she enters, looks around, and finds a manuscript on the piano inscribed by Peter Warlock with an address. She takes a cab to the address. Looking through a window she sees a man playing the piano. Lily goes to the front door and knocks. The man answers, but does not reveal himself. Thinking he is Warlock, Lily explains that she heard his music at a concert a few weeks prior and thought it was wonderful. The man welcomes her in, but once in the light, Lily is shocked to see that it is Philip. Enraged, she demands to know what is going on. In a panic, Philip (Warlock), offers her a cup of tea; but when he goes to the kitchen, Lily escapes. Returning to Gerald's home, she confronts him by saying that she knows who Warlock is. Gerald tells her that she should just let things be as they are and that his music is getting better on account of his illness. In an attempt to get help for Philip, Lily goes to see Mrs. Heseltine, who informs her that she will not help in seeking treatment for Philip. Paranoid, she believes that Lily wants Philip all to herself. The next day, Philip demands to know why Lily went to see his mother. She tells him she wants only the best for him. At work, Heseltine's boss informs him that Warlock has brought suit against the paper for libel. He instructs Heseltine that he is to temper his criticism at the next Warlock concert. At the concert, Heseltine has a nervous breakdown and starts shouting from the audience. The orchestra stops playing and Heseltine continues to berate the music while ushers escort him out. Hearing about the incident, Lily finds Philip back at his flat distraught. They argue and he accidentally pushes her down the stairs, knocking her unconscious. He gently picks her up and places her outside the front door on the stoop. Going back inside, he turns on the gas and begins to type at his desk. Upon regaining consciousness, Lily rushes upstairs to find Philip dead. She opens the window and reads what he has typed. It is the beginning of the only positive review of a Peter Warlock performance.

== Cast ==
- Jeremy Northam as Philip Heseltine / Peter Warlock
- Tushka Bergen as Lily Buxton
- Allan Corduner as Oscar Butterworth
- Hilton McRae as Gerald Duffy
- Bronwen Mantel as Madge Ryan
- Dilys Laye as Mrs. Heseltine
- Domini Blythe as Lady Virginia Milford
- Colin Fox as Sir Thomas Beecham
- Michael Sinelnikoff as Sir Charles Devlin
- Chris Wiggins as Angus Fergusson
- David Frances as Eric
- Jonathan Stark as Concerned Man
- Benoit Langlais as Young Heseltine
- Martin Kevan as Radio Announcer
- Frank Schorpion as George Heseltine
- James Bradford as Club Manager
- Robert Burns as Organist
- Ari Snyder as Choir Master

== Production ==
The film was shot primarily in Montreal with cinematography by Lauro Escorel. Although the screenplay is based on the life and career of Philip Heseltine, similarities between the real-life Heseltine and the character in the film are almost non-existent. Whereas in the film Heseltine is a prolific contributor to the London Journal, the real-life Heseltine only worked for four months as a music critic at the Daily Mail and never reviewed his own music. Likewise, Heseltine never suffered from dissociative identity disorder. The character of love interest Lily Buxton is fictitious; Heseltine was in fact married and had a son. The character Gerald Duffy, however, is based on real-life friend Cecil Gray, who in 1934 wrote a biography about Warlock. According to Vice President of The Peter Warlock Society, Brian Collins, Gray raises in his book the original idea that because Heseltine was a music critic, that this in some way suggested Warlock was a frustrated composer. Furthermore, Gray surmises that it was because of this lifelong distress that Heseltine committed suicide, a theory that could not be deemed conclusive. The film conveys a continuing ascension of Warlock's creativity but in reality Heseltine felt that his talents were on a constant decline. Originally titled Voices, in the UK and Canada it was released in the United States as Voices From a Locked Room.

== Reception ==
Although the acting performances have been praised, the story itself has been described as "intriguing but farfetched." Reviewer Diane Selkirk wrote: "This is the sort of film during which the viewers can't help but wonder if the truth might have made for a better movie than fiction." At a premiere showing, Brian Collins recalls, "It elicited much laughter ... most of it arose from the ludicrous misrepresentation of the Warlock story put across by the plot." Variety reviewer Todd McCarthy wrote: "... it seems unarguably serious but of limited appeal. Still, the picture retains a certain pull." The production quality has been called “excellent"; and Variety said it had a "lushly low-key studio look that serves its purpose."

== Soundtrack ==
It was announced in the March 11, 1995 issue of Billboard that record producer Peter Gelb would produce the soundtrack for Sony Pictures. Despite the fact the film is about Peter Warlock, only two works by the composer are featured: Rest, Sweet Nymphs and Sleep. The rest of the music was composed by Elliot Goldenthal. Author Charles P. Mitchell writes, "This is unfortunate because Warlock certainly composed a number of outstanding works." Selkirk writes: "The film's music ... is almost overbearingly prominent ... screen time tips a little too far in favor of the extended nightclub scenes." Mitchell agrees: "Bergin is a complete delight as Lily Buxton, although the film spends a bit too much time on her nightclub songs." Tushka Bergen was voice dubbed by soprano Sylvia McNair.
