= Chappelli Cycles =

Bicycle manufacturer

- Type: Subsidiary
- Founded: 2010; 16 years ago
- Headquarters: Victoria, Australia
- Area served: Worldwide

Chappelli Cycles is a bicycle manufacturer based in Sydney, Australia. Its bicycles are sold in Australia, the United States and Europe.

== History ==
Chappelli Cycles was started in 2010 by an Australia entrepreneur Tom Davies and English industrial designer Pablo Chappelli. At the time of launch it was the first pure-play online bicycle store in Australia specialising in fixed-gear bicycles.

The company takes its name from Robert Chappelli, Pablo's father, who used to design and build his own bicycles to race in the Tour de France trials in England.

In 2011, Chappelli Cycles released its first 3-speed internal hub bicycle and an 8-speed model. The following year, 2012, Chappelli Cycles won an Australian Design Award for the Chappelli NuVinci bicycle, and launched Australia's first glow-in-the-dark bicycle.

== Expansion ==
In 2011 the company opened a franchise in Northern Europe to service Scandinavian and German markets, and the next year its franchise in France to service continental Europe. In 2013, Chappelli opened its first retail premises in Sydney and Melbourne, Australia.

== Awards ==
In 2012, Chappelli Cycles was awarded an Australian Design Award for the Chappelli NuVinci bicycle. Designed in collaboration with Fallbrook Technologies, the bicycle's main feature was its NuVinci Continuously Variable Transmission. In 2011, Chappelli Cycles also won the most popular design prize in the Australian wide Stoli Vodka Original Fund Design award for its 8-speed chrome plated bicycle.

== See also ==
- List of Australian bicycle brands and manufacturers
