= Muhammad: Legacy of a Prophet =

2002 documentary film directed by Omar al-Qattan

- Muhammad: Legacy of a Prophet promotional poster
- Directed by: Michael Schwarz; Omar al-Qattan
- Starring: Karen Armstrong; Hossein Nasr; Daisy Khan; M. Cherif Bassiouni; Mohammed Zakariya
- Narrated by: André Braugher
- Theme music composer: Kabir Helminski; Martin Bresnick
- Country of origin: United States
- Original language: English

Production
- Producers: Michael Schwarz; Alex Kronemer; Michael Wolfe
- Editors: Glen Ebesu; Gail Huddleson
- Running time: 116 minutes
- Production companies: Kikim Media; Unity Productions Foundation

Original release
- Network: PBS
- Release: December 18, 2002

Muhammad: Legacy of a Prophet is a PBS documentary film about the life of the Islamic prophet Muhammad based on historical records and on the stories of living American Muslims who call Muhammad the Messenger of God. It was produced in 2002 by Alex Kronemer and Michael Wolfe of Unity Productions Foundation and Kikim Media.

== Content ==
The film explores Arabian desert and ancient Middle Eastern sites to explore the story of Muhammad. The film also focuses on America's estimated 7 million Muslims and how Islam impacts their daily lives. Scholars on Islam provide historical context and critical perspective.

=== Appearances ===
Among the people in the film, the following are included:

- Karen Armstrong - Former nun, author on Abrahamic religions and 2008 TEDPrize winner
- John Voll - Professor of Islamic history, Georgetown University
- Seyyed Hossein Nasr - Professor of Islamic Literature, George Washington University, and a well-known Islamic scholar, honored at the United Nations
- Reuven Firestone - Scholar of Islam and Judaism, Hebrew Union College
- Daisy Khan - Executive director of ASMA Society and wife of Feisal Abdul Rauf
- M. Cherif Bassiouni - Professor of Law, DePaul University, 1999 Nobel Peace Prize nominee.
- Mohammed Zakariya - Muslim convert and master Arabic calligrapher
- Hamza Yusuf - Muslim convert and co-founder of Zaytuna College
- Michael Wolfe - Muslim convert and author of The Hadj
- Jameel Johnson - Muslim and Chief of Staff for Congressman Gregory Meeks
- Kevin James - Muslim convert, Supervising Fire Marshall from New York City Fire Department (arson investigator and 9/11 first responder)
- Najah Bazzy - Muslim Critical Care Nurse, Dearborn MI (Appears with her husband, Ali, and daughter Nadia)
- Abdullah El-Amin - Local Imam
- Anwar al-Awlaki - Scholar, former Chaplain at George Washington University, former Imam in California and Washington D.C.
- Sayed Hassan Al-Qazwini, the Imam of The Islamic Center of America and very respected Shia scholar

== Funding ==
Funding for Muhammad: Legacy of a Prophet was provided by the Corporation for Public Broadcasting, The David and Lucile Packard Foundation, Arabian Bulk Trade, Sabadia Family Foundation, Irfan Kathwari Foundation, El-Hibri Foundation, Qureishi Family Trust, and many individual contributors.

== Distribution ==
Muhammad was originally broadcast nationwide on December 18, 2002 on PBS and has since been rebroadcast on well over 600 individual PBS stations. The United States viewership is estimated to be over 10 million. The documentary received worldwide broadcast in many languages on National Geographic International in December 2003 and many other countries.

The film is used in communities, schools, universities, religious congregations, and civic organizations throughout the United States to increase Americans' understanding of Muslims and Islam.

== See also ==
- List of Islamic films
- Depictions of Muhammad
- List of films about Muhammad
- Muhammad in Islam
- Alex Kronemer
- Michael Wolfe
