= Ciombola =

Australian bike frame company

- Type: Subsidiary
- Founded: 1958; 68 years ago
- Headquarters: Victoria, Australia
- Area served: Worldwide

Ciombola was a bike frame company which was based in Melbourne, Australia, and built bike frames between 1998 and 2005.

Ciombola bike

The frames were designed by Michael Abel of Melbourne and hand built by Master frame builder Wayne Roberts in the factory at Holden Hill, a suburb of Adelaide in South Australia. The 7005 aluminium Ciombola models were imported from builders in Asia as blank frames and painted in the Adelaide factory.

Following the retirement of Roberts from full-time frame-building, the Ciombola designer and owner closed down operations in 2005. The frames made by Wayne Roberts under the Ciombola marque have since become collectibles.

== See also ==
- List of Australian bicycle brands and manufacturers
