= Muhammad in film =

Depictions of the main Islamic prophet in movies

The representation of the Islamic prophet Muhammad (as with other visual portrayals) is a debated topic both within and outside of Islam. Although the Quran does not explicitly forbid images of Muhammad, there are a few hadith (supplemental teachings) which have explicitly prohibited Muslims from creating visual depictions of anything that has a soul. Because the different branches of Islam use different Hadith collections, there is a division on this issue between the two major denominations of Islam, Sunni and Shia Islam.

Most Sunni Muslims believe that visual depictions of all the prophets of Islam should be prohibited and are particularly averse to visual representations of Muhammad. In 1926, Egyptian actor Youssef Wahbi was in discussions to play Muhammad in a film financed by the Turkish government under Atatürk. When the Sunni Islamic Al-Azhar University in Cairo heard about it, scholars there released a fatwa stipulating that Islam forbids the depiction of Muhammad on screen and King Fuad then sent a severe warning to the actor, threatening to exile him and strip him of his Egyptian nationality. As a result of the controversy, the film was abandoned.

In Shia Islam, scholars historically were also against such depictions, but have taken a more relaxed view over the years and images of Muhammad are quite common nowadays. A fatwa given by Ali al-Sistani, the Shi'a marja of Iraq, states that it is permissible to depict Muhammad, even in television or movies, if done with respect.

== Notable films ==
=== L'Inferno ===
Dante's Inferno, originally released in Italy as L'Inferno, was perhaps the first depictions of Muhammad in a feature-length film. It has a brief section in which Muhammad is being tortured in Hell with his chest opened, exposing his entrails.

=== The Message ===
Mohammad, Messenger of God, released in the US as The Message, was the first major film about Muhammad. The movie debuted on January 1, 1976, and on July 29 of the same year, it made its London premiere at the Plaza theater. The movie was produced in two different languages: Arabic and English. On August 19, 1976, the Arabic version made its debut at London's Curzon theater. The English version ran for nine weeks and the Arabic version for six weeks during the screening period, which ended on September 29.

When director Mustafa Akkad was shooting the film, he made use of an American cast and an Egyptian cast. In the English version Anthony Quinn played Hamza, Michael Ansara Muhammad's principal opponent Abu Sufyan, and Irene Papas Abu Sufyan's wife Hind. In the Arab version these roles were played by Egyptian actors. However, in a number of overall shots, in which a large group is acting, such as the Battle of Badr, it can be heard that the scene is shot only once, as the actors shout "Allahu Akbar", whereas in other similar scenes the director opted for "God is great".

Even though the movie is about Muhammad, the director decided to shoot the film so as to not depict Muhammad. Akkad frequently changed the position of the camera at moments when Muhammad would be brought into vision. When Muhammad was essential to a scene, the camera would show events from his point of view.

The Message became very popular, not the least in the circles of Muslims, for example in Africa, and Asia. Even so, two well-known fatwas from Al-Azhar University and Shiite Council of Lebanon were issued about The Message.

It is certainly probable that this is not the result of the creativity of the filmmakers but of the rules announced by the Islamic scholars of the Azhar and the Shia Council of Lebanon, who prohibited any representation of Muhammad's wives as well as of Muhammad himself.

=== Muhammad: The Last Prophet ===
Muhammad: The Last Prophet is an animated film produced by Badr International according to the same aniconic principles as The Message. Its director is Richard Rich. The movie was released in 2004 and it was screened in a limited number of movie-theatres in the United States and the United Kingdom. The film focuses on the early period of Islam.

=== Muhammad: The Messenger of God ===
In October 2012, Iranian director Majid Majidi began shooting a film titled Muhammad: The Messenger of God with plans to show Muhammad on screen, though not his face, as per Shia tradition. The film's world premiere was on August 27, 2015.

=== The Lady of Heaven ===
In June 2020, Deadline Hollywood reported that Enlightened Kingdom was producing The Lady of Heaven which would be the first film to depict the face of Muhammad. In order to respect aniconism in Islam, Muhammad was portrayed by lighting and cinematic effects as opposed to being portrayed by an actor or single individual. The producers of the film also discussed how they tackled the very delicate aspect of depicting a Muslim holy personality. A trailer for the film was released on December 23, 2020 followed by a US theatrical release date a year later on December 10, 2021.

=== Later projects ===
There are several new films currently in production about Muhammad, regarded as the "second of their kind" (referring to Western films honoring the portrayal of Muhammad).

In October 2008, Producer Oscar Zoghbi, who worked on the original The Message, stated that he would shooting a remake called The Messenger of Peace, to be shot around the holy cities of Mecca and Medina.

Film producer Barrie M. Osborne has been hired as an adviser on a possible series of epics about Muhammad. The films, which are financed by a Qatari media company and will be supervised by the Egyptian cleric Yusuf al-Qaradawi, are unlikely to depict Muhammad at all on screen as per Sunni tradition which sees all depictions of the prophets as blasphemous.

== List of films ==
Date	Production company	Title	Country of origin	References
Unknown	History Channel	Muhammad: Biography	UK	
Unknown	Unknown	Muhammad: A Mercy to Mankind		
March 10, 1911	Milano Films	L'Inferno	Italy	
September 3, 1977	Moustapha Akkad	The Message (or Mohammad, Messenger of God)	UK, USA	
2000	PBS	Islam: Empire of Faith	USA	
March 12, 2002	Mpi Home Video	Story of Islam	USA	
December 17, 2002	PBS	Muhammad: Legacy of a Prophet	USA	
May 2, 2004	BBC	A Muslim In The Family	UK	
November 14, 2004	Fine Media Group	Muhammad: The Last Prophet	USA	
October 21, 2004	National Geographic	Inside Mecca	USA	
2005	BBC (BBC Four)	An Islamic History of Europe	UK	
2005	BBC	The Smell of Paradise	UK	
March 2, 2006	Towers Productions	Secrets of the Koran (Decoding the Past)	USA	
September 25, 2006	Quantum Leaps; EDS	Understanding Islam: The Signs of the Last Day	Turkey	
July 2011	BBC (BBC Two)	The Life of Muhammad	UK	
July 2012	Nakoula Basseley Nakoula	Innocence of Muslims	US	
March 2015	Nurtaban Film Industry	Muhammad: The Messenger of God	Iran	
December 10, 2021	Enlightened Kingdom	The Lady of Heaven	UK	

== See also ==
- List of Islamic films
- List of animated Islamic films
- Depictions of Muhammad
- Historicity of Muhammad
- History of Islam
- List of biographies of Muhammad
- Muhammad in Islam
- Prophetic biography
- Maslaha
