= M. Cherif Bassiouni =

Egyptian academic

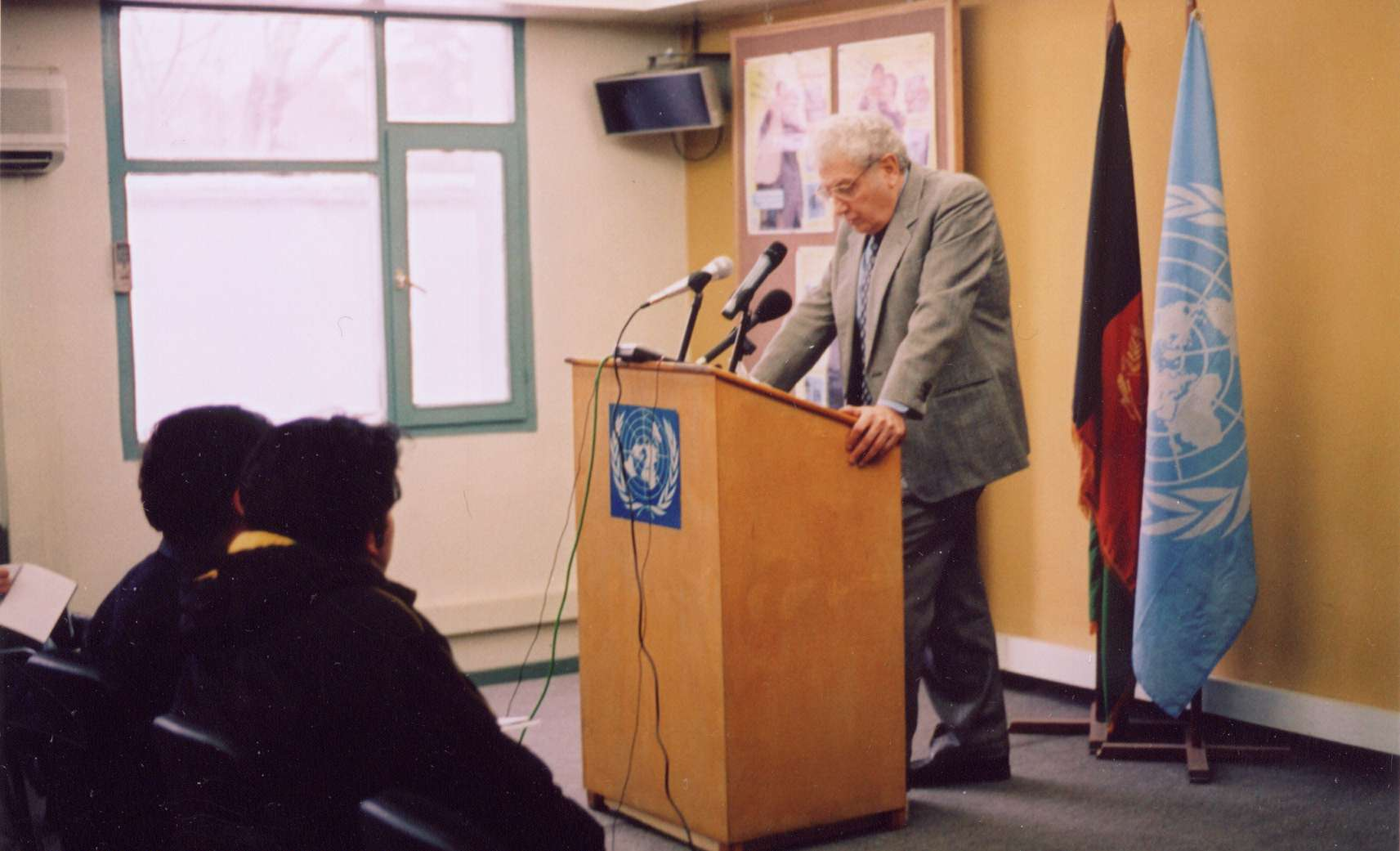
Professor Bassiouni lecturing in 2005

Mahmoud Cherif Bassiouni (Arabic: محمود شريف بسيوني; 9 December 1937 – 25 September 2017) was an Egyptian-American emeritus professor of law at DePaul University, where he taught from 1964 to 2012. He served in numerous United Nations positions and served as the consultant to the US Department of State and Justice on many projects. He was a founding member of the International Human Rights Law Institute at DePaul University which was established in 1990. He served as president from 1990 to 1997 and then as president emeritus. Bassiouni is often referred to by the media as "the Godfather of International Criminal Law" and a "war crimes expert". As such, he served on the Steering Committee for The Crimes Against Humanity Initiative, which was launched to study the need for a comprehensive convention on the prevention and punishment of crimes against humanity, and draft a proposed treaty. He spearheaded the drafting of the proposed convention, which as of 2014 is being debated at the International Law Commission.

In 2010, Bassiouni donated his personal papers to the DePaul University Special Collections and Archives, where his materials are open to researchers.

== Early life ==
Bassiouni was born in Cairo and educated in Egypt and France.

== Career ==
Bassiouni was admitted to the practice of law in Illinois, Washington, DC, the United States Supreme Court, and the Second, Fifth, Seventh, Ninth, and Eleventh Circuits and the United States Court of Military Appeals. He was also admitted to practice before the Egyptian Supreme Court. Bassiouni handled many international cases on extradition and international cooperation in criminal matters, and coordinated major litigation involving multiple parties, including states, on matters involving international law.

=== Academic career ===
In 1972, Bassiouni was one of the founders of the International Institute of Higher Studies in Criminal Sciences (ISISC) located in Siracusa, Italy, where he served as dean from 1972 to 1989 and then as president to date. He also served as the secretary general of the International Association of Penal Law (L'Association Internationale de Droit Penal) in Paris, France, from 1974 to 1989 and as president for three five-year terms from 1989 to 2004, when he was elected honorary president.

Bassiouni was a guest scholar at the Woodrow Wilson International Center for Scholars in Washington, D.C. in 1972; visiting professor of law, New York University Law School in 1971; Fulbright-Hays Professor of International Criminal Law, University of Freiburg, Germany in 1970; non-resident professor of criminal law at University of Cairo from 1996 to 2006. He also lectured at various universities in the United States and abroad. He was a member of the Whitney R. Harris World Law Institute's International Council.

Bassiouni authored 27 books, edited 45 books, and authored 265 articles on international criminal law, comparative criminal law, human rights, and U.S. criminal law that have been published in various law journals and books. Additionally, he wrote 14 monographs on such subjects as history, politics, and religion. Some of these publications have been cited by the International Court of Justice (ICJ), International Criminal Tribunal for the Former Yugoslavia (ICTY), International Criminal Tribunal for Rwanda (ICTR), the European Court of Human Rights, and the highest courts of: Australia, Canada, India, Israel, Trinidad and Tobago, South Africa (Supreme Court and Constitutional Court) and United Kingdom (House of Lords, Court of Appeals, High Court and Divisional Court of England & Wales, and Scottish High Court of the Judiciary), and New Zealand.

In the United States, his works have been repeatedly cited by the United States Supreme Court, U.S. Circuit and District courts, as well as various state supreme courts. Several of his books and articles have been written in and translated into: Arabic, Chinese, French, German, Hungarian, Italian, Persian, Portuguese, Russian and Spanish.

=== United Nations roles ===
Bassiouni was appointed to the following United Nations roles:

- Chair, Commission of Inquiry for Libya (2011–2012)
- Independent Expert on Human Rights for Afghanistan (2004–2006)
- Independent expert on the Rights to Restitution, Compensation, and Rehabilitation for Victims of Grave Violations of Human Rights and Fundamental Freedoms (1998–2000)
- Chair, Drafting Committee of the Diplomatic Conference on the Establishment of an International Criminal Court (1998)
- Vice-chair of the General Assembly's Preparatory Committee on the Establishment of an International Criminal Court (1996–1998)
- Vice-chair of the General Assembly's Ad Hoc Committee on the Establishment of an International Criminal Court (1995)
- Chair, Commission of Experts Established Pursuant to Security Council 780 (1992) to Investigate Violations of International Humanitarian Law in the Former Yugoslavia (1993–1994) and Special Rapporteur on Gathering and Analysis of the Facts (1992–1993)
- Consultant to the Sixth and Seventh United Nations Congress on Crime Prevention (1980 and 1985)
- Consultant to the Committee on Southern African of the Commission on Human Rights (1980–1981)
- Co-chair, Independent Committee of Experts Drafting the Convention on the Prevention and Suppression of Torture (1978)
- Honorary vice-president, Fifth United Nations Congress on Crime Prevention (1975)

=== Consultant to the US Government ===
In addition to his many positions in the UN, Bassiouni served as a legal consultant to the US Department of State and Justice on projects relating to international trafficking in drugs (1973) and international control of terrorism (1975 and 1978–79). He was also a consultant to the Department of State on the US hostage crisis in Iran from 1979 to 1980.

=== Bahrain Independent Commission of Inquiry ===
Bassiouni was appointed Chair of the Bahrain Independent Commission of Inquiry in 2011, which was tasked with investigating violations committed during public protests in Bahrain in February and March 2011.

== Awards and honours ==
Bassiouni held the following law degrees: Baccalaureat Lettres LLB University of Cairo, 1955; JD Indiana University School of Law, 1964; LL.M. John Marshall Law School in International and Maritime Law, 1966; and S.J.D. George Washington University in International Criminal Law, 1973. Furthermore, he studied law at University of Burgundy, France, and at the University of Geneva, Switzerland.

Among the many distinctions and awards he received were a nomination for the Nobel Peace Prize (1999); Wolfgang Friedmann Memorial Award of Columbia University (2012); Cook County Bar Association Lincoln Award (2012); Dominican University's Bradford O’Neill Medallion for Social Justice (2011); George Washington University Distinguished Alumni Scholar Award, Washington, D.C. (2010–2011); Washington University School of Law, World Peace Through Law Award (2010); DePaul University Via Sapientiae Award (2009); Hague Prize for International Law (2007); Cesare Beccaria Justice Medal of the International Society for Social Defense (2007); The Medal of the Commission de Derechos Humanos del Estado de Mexico (2006); DePaul University St. Vincent DePaul Society's Humanitarian Award (2000); International Association of Penal Law- V.V. Pella, Champion of International Criminal Justice Award (1999); John Marshall Law School's Lifetime Achievement Award (1999); Defender of Democracy Award from Parliamentarians for Global Action (1998); United Nations Association's Adlai E. Stevenson Award (1993); The Special Award of the Council of Europe (1990); and the secretary-general of the Council of Europe's Award (1984).

In 1999 Bassiouni was nominated for the Nobel Peace Prize for his work in the field of international criminal justice and for his contribution to the creation of the International Criminal Court. He did not win as Médecins Sans Frontières received the award in 1999.

In 2007 he was awarded the Hague Award for International Law for his "distinguished contribution in the field of international law". He was awarded a colloquium in his honour: The Third Hague Prize Colloquium. This colloquium was organized by the T.M.C. Asser Instituut and the Hague Institute for the Internationalisation of Law. The winner of the Hague Prize is given the honour of selecting the fundamental principle of law on which the Hague Colloquium will be organized.

He also received the Via Sapientiae Award (DePaul University) in 2009, the Beccaria Medal from the International Society for Social Defence in 2009, and the Silvia Sandano Award of the University of Rome in 2008.

In May 2010 Cherif spoke out in support of the Gaza Flotilla.

He also made an appearance in the PBS broadcast documentary Muhammad: Legacy of a Prophet (2002), produced by Unity Productions Foundation.

In addition to his many awards, Bassiouni held a number of honorary degrees: Doctor of Law Honoris Causa, University of Salzburg (2013); Doctor of Law Honoris Causa, University of Tirana, Albania (2013); Doctor of Law Honoris Causa, University of Ghent, Belgium (2011); Doctor of Law Honoris Causa, Case Western Reserve University, United States (2010); Doctor of Humane Letters, Catholic Theological Union, Chicago, US (2009); Doctor of Law honoris causa, National University of Ireland, Galway (LLD) (2001); Doctor of Law honoris causa, Niagara University (LLD) (1997); Doctor of Law honoris causa (Docteur d'Etat en Droit), University of Pau and Pays de l'Adour, France (1988); and Doctor of Law honoris causa (Dottore in Giurisprudenza), University of Torino, Italy (1981).

He has received the following medals:

- Order of Military Valor (First Class), Arab Republic of Egypt (1956)
- Order of Merit of the Italian Republic, Commendatore (1976), Grande Ufficiale (1977), Cavaliere di Gran Croce (2006)
- Order of Scientific Merit (First Class), Arab Republic of Egypt (1984)
- Grand Cross Order of Merit of the Austrian Republic (Commander) (1990)
- Order of Lincoln of Illinois, United States of America (2001)
- Légion d'honneur (Officier), France (2003)
- Grand Cross of the Order of Merit (Commander), Federal Republic of Germany (2003)
- Légion d’Honneur (Officier), Republic of France (2003)
- Ordre des Palmes Académiques (Commander), Republic of France (2006)

He received numerous academic and civic awards, including:

- The Special Award of the Council of Europe (1990)
- The Defender of Democracy Award, Parliamentarians for Global Action (1998)
- The Adlai Stevenson Award of the United Nations Association (1993)
- The Saint Vincent DePaul Humanitarian Award (2000)
- The Dominican University Bradford-O’Neill Medallion for Social Justice (2011)
- Bassiouni was inducted as a laureate of The Lincoln Academy of Illinois and awarded the Order of Lincoln (the State's highest honor) by the Governor of Illinois in 2001 in the area of Government and Law.
- The City of Chicago named a portion of the street on which Bassiouni lived in his honor.

== Publications ==
Bassiouni was the author of 24 books, editor of 46 works, and author of 255 articles on a wide range of legal issues, including International Criminal Law, Comparative Criminal Law, Human Rights, and US Criminal Law. One of his last articles was a contribution to the book Constitutionalism, Human Rights and Islam after the Arab Spring edited by Rainer Grote and Tilmann Röder. His publications have been translated into Arabic, Chinese, English, Persian, French, Georgian, German, Hungarian, Italian, Russian and Spanish. Some of these publications have been cited by the International Court of Justice, the International Criminal Tribunal for the Former Yugoslavia (ICTY), The International Criminal Tribunal for Rwanda (ICTR). They have also been cited by the United States Supreme Court, United States Appellate and Federal District Courts, as well as by various State Supreme Courts.

== Lectures ==
Perspectives on Post-conflict Justice in the Lecture Series of the United Nations Audiovisual Library of International Law.

== Controversies ==
=== International Criminal Tribunal for the former Yugoslavia ===
While many felt that Bassiouni would become the first prosecutor of the ICTY, failure to secure the prosecutor position was blocked by the United Kingdom and has been attributed in part to a perception that he would "move too quickly to charge Serb and possibly Croatian leaders with war crimes". Many politicians feared that allowing Bassiouni to be a prosecutor of the ICTY would be a conflict of interest because many communities that were ethnically cleansed by Serb paramilitary forces were Bosnian Muslim villages, and because Bassiouni himself is a Muslim, born in the Middle East. One representative to the Security Council was reported saying that Bassiouni was "a fanatic who had too much information". In the initial vote count in the Security Council, Bassiouni was supported by seven countries, the United States being one of them, and was opposed by seven countries with one abstention.

=== Lawsuits ===
Bassiouni sued the FBI (No. 04-3888), which heard oral arguments in 2005. The case centered around information collected and maintained by the FBI about Bassiouni; in March 2001, upon receiving documents as a result of a request protected by the Freedom of Information Act, Bassiouni attempted to amend the documents, which – according to Bassiouni – wrongfully linked him with Palestine liberation forces and other paramilitary organizations. In a letter to the United States Department of Justice in 2002, Bassiouni argued that information retained by the FBI violated subsection (e)(7) of the Privacy Act of 1974, which states: "Each agency that maintains a system of records shall maintain no record describing how any individual exercises rights guaranteed by the First Amendment unless expressly authorized by statute or by the individual about whom the record is maintained or unless pertinent to and within the scope of an authorized law enforcement activity." 5 U.S.C. § 552a(e)(7). The FBI denied Bassiouni's request to amend records in his name, and Bassiouni appealed the decision with the United States Department of Justice; however, the US DOJ affirmed the decision, stating that the records were exempt from the Privacy Act of 1974 pursuant to 5 U.S.C. § 552a(j)(2). Bassiouni appealed the DOJ's decision but the Seventh Circuit Court of Appeals found in favor of the FBI.

=== Bassiouni Commission ===
Bassiouni was appointed head of the Bahrain Independent Commission of Inquiry (BICI), known locally as the Bassiouni Commission, at the time of its establishment, 29 June 2011, by the King of Bahrain. On 9 August 2011, Nabeel Rajab, head of the Bahrain Centre for Human Rights, criticized Bassiouni in an open letter for statements he (Bassiouni) made in an 8 August 2011 interview with Reuters. In the interview, Bassiouni praised the cooperation that the BICI has received from the Interior Ministry and states that there was never a policy of excessive use of force.

== Death ==
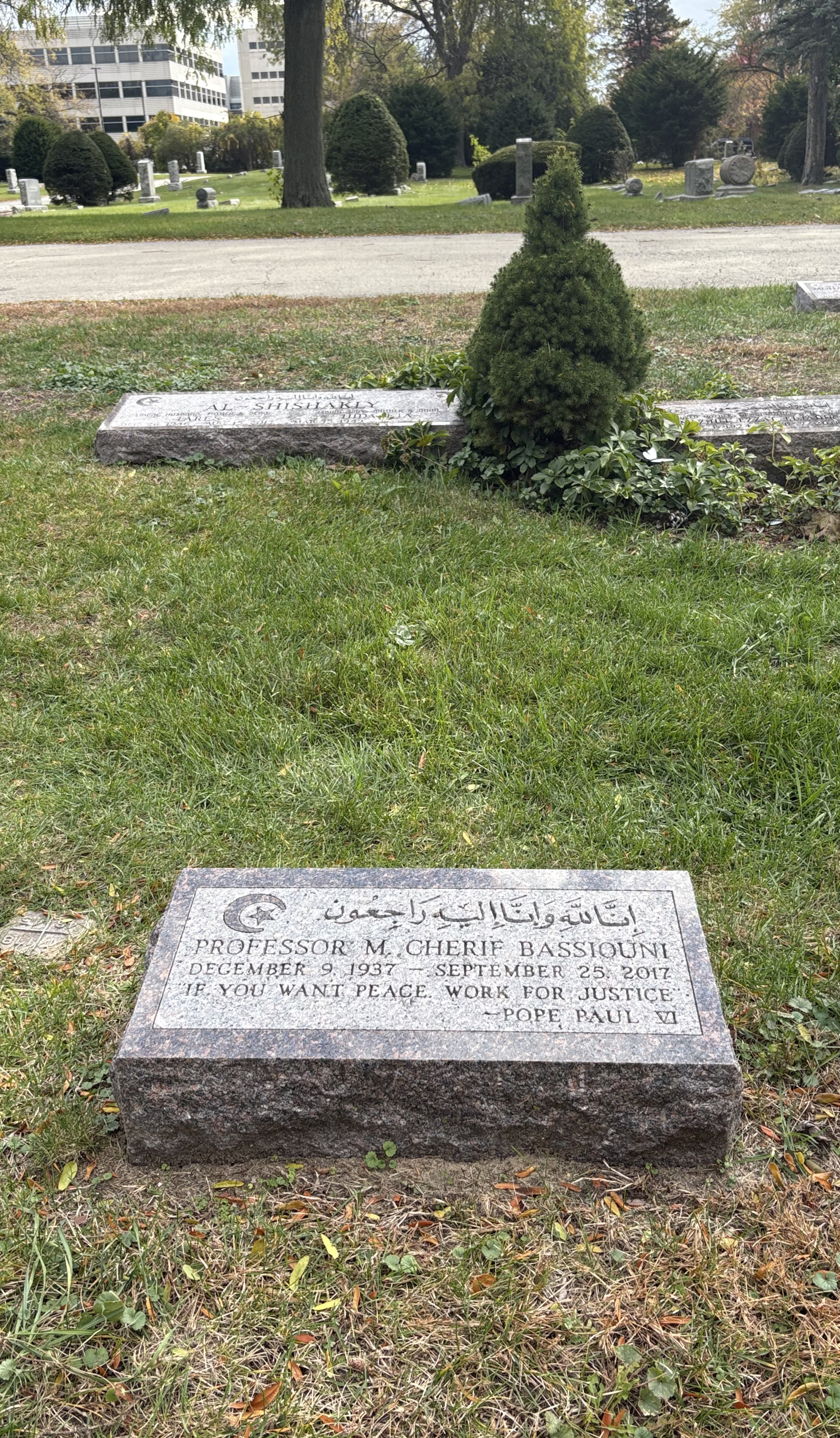
Bassiouni's grave at Memorial Park Cemetery

Bassiouni died from cancer at his home in Chicago on 25 September 2017. He was buried at Memorial Park Cemetery in Skokie, Illinois.

== See also ==
- ICTY
- International Criminal Court
- International criminal law
- War rape
