= Cyclops (toy company) =

Australian toy manufacturer

- Industry: Retail
- Founded: 1913
- Headquarters: Leichhardt, New South Wales, Australia
- Owner: Hunter Leisure Pty Ltd
- Website: www.cyclopsbikes.com.au

Cyclops is an Australian manufacturer of toys, primarily known for children's pedal cars.

== History ==
The business was founded by John Heine Sheet Metal at Leichhardt, New South Wales in 1913. The name Cyclops was registered in 1915 and the company continued to grow during the 1920s and the Great Depression. In 1946 the company name was officially changed to Cyclops Pty Ltd, but it was taken over by a British company after World War II.

In 1963 Cyclops Pty Ltd celebrated its 50th anniversary by winning the Australian Wheel toy of the year. It had previously won several Australian Toy of the Year and Wheel Toy of the Year awards.

In the 1970s that company was facing bankruptcy and was taken over by another British company. In the late 1980s the toys were being manufactured offshore, but it was returned to Australian ownership when purchased by Hunter Toyline Pty Ltd (Now Hunter Leisure Pty Ltd) in 1992.

== Enthusiasts ==
Cyclops Toys were a major part of Australian childhood. Although the original style of toy is no longer available their appeal has continued as they are viewed as Australian icons and for many bring back memories of childhood. Groups such as Pedalmania which began in Luddenham Sydney in 1997 collect information and photographs which bring happy memories of childhood in Australia.

== See also ==
- A.L. Lindsay & Company
- List of Australian bicycle brands and manufacturers
