= Barbarians (miniseries) =

2004 History Channel miniseries

- Country of origin: United States
- Original language: English

Original release
- Network: The History Channel
- Release: 2004 – 2007

Barbarians is a 2004 miniseries on The History Channel which tells the story of tribes from the Early Middle Ages and the Late Middle Ages. Two series have currently been produced, each consisting of four episodes – the first aired in 2004, and the second aired in 2007. The series tells about what the groups did, who they conquered, and how they fell. Clancy Brown narrated season 1 and Bob Boving narrated season 2. The 2004 miniseries was History Channel's highest-rated telecast of the year.

== Episodes ==
=== Season 1 (2004) ===
- The Goths
- The Vikings
- The Mongols
- The Huns

=== Season 2 (2007) ===
- The Vandals
- The Saxons
- The Franks
- The Lombards
