= Jonathan M. Bloom =

American scholar of Islamic art (born 1950)

- Born: Jonathan Max Bloom; April 7, 1950 (age 76); United States
- Occupations: Art historian Educator
- Spouse: Sheila Blair (m. 1980)
- Children: 2 (Felicity and Oliver)

Academic background
- Education: Harvard University; University of Michigan
- Thesis: Meaning in Early Fatimid Architecture: Islamic Art in North Africa and Egypt in the Fourth Century (1980)

Academic work
- Discipline: Art history
- Sub-discipline: Islamic art Asian art
- Institutions: Harvard University; Boston College; Virginia Commonwealth University

Jonathan Max Bloom (born April 7, 1950) is an American art historian and educator. Bloom has served as the dual Norma Jean Calderwood University Professor of Islamic and Asian Art at Boston College, along with his wife, Sheila Blair.

== Career ==
Bloom received his Bachelor of Arts in Art History from Harvard University in 1972. He then continued education and received a Master of Arts in Art History from the University of Michigan in 1975, where his thesis concerned Raqqa ware and was titled "Raqqa Ceramics of the Freer Gallery of Art." Then, Bloom received a Doctor of Philosophy in Art History from Harvard in 1980, graduating in the same exact program as his wife, Sheila Blair, whom he married in that year. His doctoral dissertation was on Fatimid architecture and was titled "Meaning in Early Fatimid Architecture: Islamic Art in North Africa and Egypt in the Fourth Century."

In the same year of receiving their doctorates, Bloom and Blair were named Aga Khan Lecturers on Islamic Art and Architecture at Harvard and at the Massachusetts Institute of Technology until 1981. Later that year, Bloom was hired as Assistant Professor of Art History at Harvard, a post which he held until 1987, followed by a year as a Research Associate.

In 2000, Bloom and Blair were named to the dual professorship of Norma Jean Calderwood University Professor of Islamic and Asian Art at Boston College. In that same year, Bloom served as the principal consultant, with Blair as artistic consultant, for the documentary titled Islam: Empire of Faith. In 2006, Bloom and Blair also began holding the joint post of Hamad bin Khalifa Endowed Chair of Islamic Art at Virginia Commonwealth University.

Bloom has held numerous visiting professorships, including at the: University of California, Los Angeles (1980), University of Geneva (1985), Yale University (1989), Trinity College (1995), University of Bamberg (1995-1996), Smith College (2000-2001), and University of Louisville (2005).

During the 2014-2015 academic year, Bloom and Blair held a research residency at the Shangri La Museum. The couple retired from teaching in 2018.

== See also ==
- List of Boston College people
- List of Harvard University people
- List of University of Michigan arts alumni
