= Michael Wolfe =

American poet and author

Michael Wolfe in 2007.

Michael B. Wolfe (born April 3, 1945) is an American poet, author, and the President and Co-Executive Producer of Unity Productions Foundation. A secular American born in Cincinnati, Ohio to a Christian mother and a Jewish father, Wolfe converted to Islam at 40 and has been a frequent lecturer on Islamic issues at universities across the United States including Harvard, Georgetown, Stanford, SUNY Buffalo, and Princeton. He holds a degree in Classics from Wesleyan University.

== Teaching career ==
Wolfe taught writing and English at Phillips Exeter and Phillips Andover academies, the California State Summer School for the Arts, and the University of California, Santa Cruz.

== Tombouctou Books ==
For fifteen years, Wolfe was sole publisher of Tombouctou Books, a small press enterprise located in Bolinas, California, that issued small editions of poetry and avant garde prose, including The Basketball Diaries by Jim Carroll, two books of fiction by the Moroccan storyteller Mohammed Mrabet; American fiction by Douglas Woolf, Dale Herd, Lucia Berlin, Bobbie Louise Hawkins, Steve Emerson, and Paul Bowles's final collection of short stories, Unwelcome Words: Seven Stories.; The Japan and India Journals by Joanne Kyger; and volumes of poetry by Tom Clark, Lewis MacAdams, Leslie Scalapino, and Duncan McNaughton.

== Writing career ==
Wolfe was a participant at Bread Loaf Writers Conference in 1960 as a 16-year-old. As an undergraduate at Wesleyan University, he studied poetry with Richard Wilbur, 1964–68, and was in a writing circle with Keith and Rosmarie Waldrop. He returned to Bread Loaf for a second summer in 1966. Wolfe was a MacDowell Colony resident in poetry in 1968. He received an Amy Lowell Traveling Poets Scholarship in 1970, which was renewed for two further years. During this time he traveled and wrote in North and West Africa. His first books of poetry How Love Gets Around and World Your Own, a book of fiction Invisible Weapons, and a travel journal In Morocco derive from this period. In the 1980s, he returned to North Africa several more times. As a Muslim he performed the pilgrimage to Mecca in 1990 and wrote extensively about it.

Wolfe's first works on Islam were a pair of books from Grove Press on the pilgrimage to Mecca: The Hadj (1993; 2015), a first-person travel account, and One Thousand Roads to Mecca (1997; updated & expanded, 2015), an anthology of 10 centuries of travelers writing about the Muslim pilgrimage to Mecca. Shortly after the September 11 attacks, he edited a collection of essays by American Muslims and others called Taking Back Islam: American Muslims Reclaim Their Faith. Taking Back Islam won the 2003 annual Wilbur Award for "Best Book of the year on a Religious Theme". In 2010, Wolfe was included in "The 500 Most Influential Muslims," (Third Edition).

In 2010, Blue Press Books published a chapbook of poems by Wolfe entitled Paradise: Reading Notes. In 2012, Blue Press published a second chapbook, entitled "Greek to Me." In 2014, Blue Press issued a third chapbook, "Tarantella." In 2014, he also assembled a fourth, longer volume of poetry, entitled Digging Up Russia: Selected Poems, 1968-2010. Between 2008 and 2012, Wolfe translated a collection of 127 epitaphs from the Greek Anthology, entitled Cut These Words into My Stone: Selected Ancient Greek Epitaphs. This collection with a set of brief contextualizing essays was published by Johns Hopkins University Press in 2013, with an Introduction by Professor Richard P. Martin, Chair of the Stanford University Classics Department. The book was well received in classical journals and among poets. It was short-listed for PEN's Best Book of Poetry in Translation.

In 2014 Wolfe completed a brief, first-person novel, entitled "The Motorbike," set in Cincinnati in 1958. In 2017, he began researching and writing a nonfiction book, "My Mother's People," about his colonial Yankee ancestry and modern American immigration.

For about four years, Wolfe wrote an occasional column for Beliefnet, a Web journal of the world's religions.

== Television and film ==
In April 1997, Wolfe hosted a televised account of the Hajj, broadcast from Mecca for Ted Koppel's Nightline on ABC. The program was nominated for Peabody, Emmy, George Polk, and National Press Club Awards. It won the annual Media Award from the Muslim Public Affairs Council. In February 2003, Wolfe worked with CNN International television news reporter Zain Verjee to produce a new half-hour documentary on the Hajj. Wolfe has been featured on hundreds of regional and national radio talk shows.

In 1999, Wolfe helped found an educational media foundation focused on promoting peace through the media, Unity Productions Foundation (UPF). In 2002, UPF produced its first full-length film, called Muhammad: Legacy of a Prophet, a two-hour television documentary on the life and times of the Islamic prophet, Muhammad. The film, which Wolfe co-created and co-produced, received a national broadcast on PBS and subsequent international broadcasts on National Geographic International. It was awarded a Cine Special Jury Award for Best Professional Documentary in its category of People and Places.

Wolfe co-produced two new films released in 2007. The first was entitled Cities of Light: The Rise and Fall of Islamic Spain. It was aired nationally on PBS on Aug. 22, 2007. Prince Among Slaves was also aired on PBS that year. It is the true story of an African prince enslaved in antebellum Mississippi struggling to regain his freedom.

UPF has since released six more contemporary documentaries. On a Wing and A Prayer (2008) and Talking through Walls (2009) both appeared on PBS. The third film, Allah Made Me Funny (2008), was released in theaters. In 2009, UPF's seventh film appeared on PBS. Based on a worldwide Gallup Poll of the Muslim world, it is called Inside Islam: What a Billion Muslims Really Think. Islamic Art: Mirror of the Invisible World, narrated by Susan Sarandon (2012) and Enemy of the Reich, narrated by Helen Mirren (2014), have followed. "The Sultan & the Saint," the story of St. Francis of Assisi and his journey to the Crusades, appeared on PBS at Christmastime, 2017. Narrated by Jeremy Irons, it was nominated for UPF's first Emmy Award. In 2018, the UPF Team began pre-production on its first animated feature film, "Lamya's Poem." All UPF films have websites and are additionally available through UPF's educational outreach project, called 20,000 Dialogues.

Wolfe continues to produce long and short-form documentaries for PBS and other broadcasters in the US and abroad with Unity Productions Foundation. His co-production partner on all these films is Alex Kronemer.

== Awards ==
Wolfe's awards include:

- Lifetime Achievement Award, Marquis "Who's Who," 2018
- PEN Best Book of Poetry in Translation, Nominee, Short Listed, 2014.
- Wilbur Award, Best Book of the Year on a Religious Theme, 2004.
- Lowell Thomas Award, "Best Cultural Tourism Article, 1998," Society of American Travel Writers, March 1999
- Marin County Arts Council Writers Award, 1990, 1983
- California State Arts Council Writers Award, 1985
- Amy Lowell Traveling Poets Scholarship, 1969, 1970, 1971
- Member, Phi Beta Kappa Society, Wesleyan University, 1968

== Published work ==
- How Love Gets Around, Soft Press, 1974
- World Your Own, Threshold Books, Putney, Vermont, 1976
- In Morocco, Sombre Reptiles, Berkeley, California 1980
- Invisible Weapons, Creative Arts Publishing, Berkeley, California 1985
- The Hadj: An American's Pilgrimage to Mecca, Atlantic Monthly Press, New York, 1993
- One Thousand Roads to Mecca: Ten Centuries of Travelers Writing about the Muslim Pilgrimage, Grove Press, New York, 1997
- Taking Back Islam: American Muslims Reclaim their Faith, Rodale Press, Pennsylvania, 2003
- Paradise: Reading Notes, Blue Press Books, 2010
- Greek to Me, Blue Press Books, 2012.
- Cut These Words into My Stone: Ancient Greek Epitaphs, Johns Hopkins University Press, 2013.
