= Ross Watson =

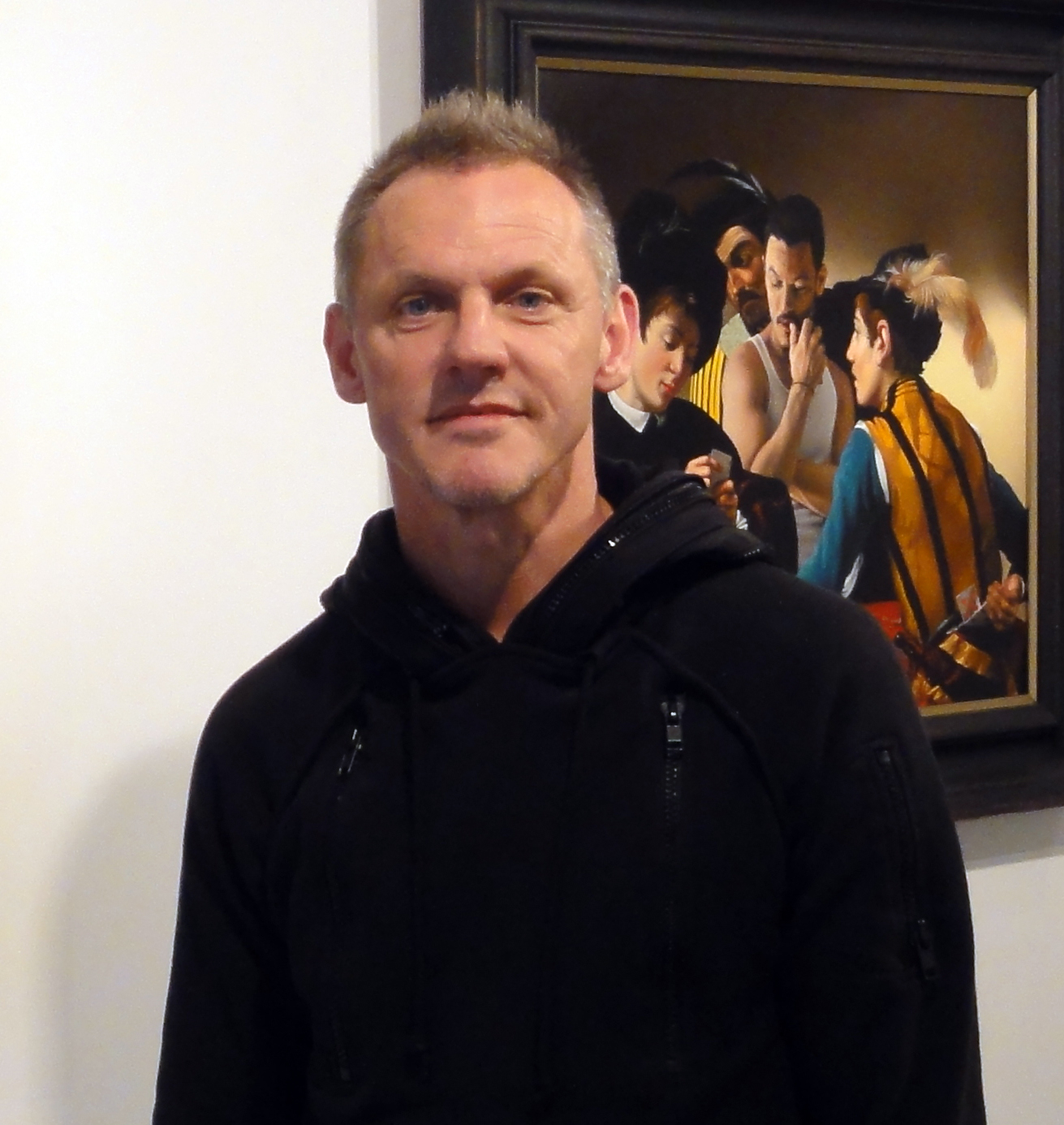
- Ross Watson with his artwork on tour in The Gallery in Redchurch Street, London.
- Born: Ross Watson; 1962 (age 63–64); Brisbane, Australia
- Known for: painting, photography
- Website: rosswatson.com

Ross Watson (born in 1962) is an Australian artist.

== Career ==
Watson has exhibited in many solo and group exhibitions since 1984, including important surveys of Australian and international contemporary art at the National Gallery of Australia, the National Gallery of Victoria, and in the Toronto and Melbourne International Art Fairs. He has been described as a "proud, gay man", and his sexuality has inspired several of his works.

His work includes portraits of Australian former rugby league footballer Ian Roberts, and Olympic Champion Matthew Mitcham.

Watson's art is included in the collections of the National Gallery of Australia, National Gallery of Victoria, National Portrait Gallery, and significant private collections including Sir Elton John, James J. O'Donnell, and James D. Wolfensohn. He also did free work in aid of the AIDS charity, the Terence Higgins Trust.

Untitled# Ross Watson, an internationally released book published by Bruno Gmünder Verlag in Germany, includes an interview with the artist by former High Court Justice, the Hon. Michael Kirby.

== Works published, shown, sold ==
=== Written ===
- Watson, Ross (2010). Untitled #. Bruno Gmuender Gmbh. ISBN 978-3867871495.
- Watson, Ross (2019). Untitled II. Ross Watson Gallery. ISBN 978-0646998985.

=== Notable Collections ===
- National Gallery of Australia, Canberra, Australia
- National Gallery of Victoria, Melbourne, Australia
- National Portrait Gallery, Canberra, Australia
- Sir Elton John Collection, United Kingdom
- James J. O'Donnell Collection, New York, USA
- Sir William Dobell Foundation, Sydney, Australia
- Charles Cholmondeley, London, United Kingdom
- Robert Woolley, Sotheby's New York, USA
- Allens Arthur Robinson, Sydney, Australia
- Citibank, Sydney, Australia
- The Von Engelhardt Collection, Geneva, Switzerland
- Sir James D. Wolfensohn, President, The World Bank 1995–2005, Washington DC, USA
- Abbott Tout Russell Kennedy, Sydney, Australia
- Pancontinental, Sydney, Australia
- Dave Clark Collection, London, United Kingdom
- Ian Roberts Collection, Sydney, Australia
- Grant Hackett, Gold Coast, Queensland, Australia
- Professor Andrew Kaye, Melbourne, Australia
- Russell Mulcahy, Sydney, Australia
- The Hon. Petro Georgiou M.P., Melbourne, Australia
- The K. Adams Collection, London, United Kingdom
- Dr Brett Archer Collection, Melbourne, Australia
- Timothy Chow Collection, New York, USA
- Evan Davis Collection, Melbourne, Australia
- Dr Simon Terry, Melbourne, Australia
- Haydon Elliot and Greg Moses Collection, Melbourne, Australia
- Dr Christopher Webber and Christopher Cossier, Sydney, Australia
- Michael Trovato Collection, Melbourne, Australia
- Sean Angles Collection, San Francisco, USA
- Professor Phillip Hamilton RFD, Melbourne, Australia
- Paul Zahra and Duncan Peerman, Sydney, Australia
- Jon Anderson and Lance Johnson, Palm Springs, USA
