= Arab and Jew: Wounded Spirits in a Promised Land =

1986 book by David K. Shipler

- First edition
- Author: David K. Shipler
- Genre: General Nonfiction
- Publisher: Times Books
- Publication date: 1986
- Publication place: United States
- ISBN: 978-0-14-010376-2

Arab and Jew: Wounded Spirits in a Promised Land, written by David K. Shipler and published by Times Books in 1986, won the 1987 Pulitzer Prize for General Nonfiction. It was adapted as a documentary for PBS in 1989 by Robert H. Gardner.
