= List of Australian bicycle brands and manufacturers =

This page lists notable Australian bicycle brands and manufacturing companies past and present. This article relates to pedal cycles, tricycles and power assisted cycles but does not include Motorcycles. For bicycle parts, see List of bicycle part manufacturing companies.

Many bicycle brands do not manufacture their own product, but rather import and re-brand bikes manufactured by others, sometimes designing the bike, specifying the equipment, and providing quality control. There are also brands that have, at different times, been manufacturers as well as re-branders: a company with manufacturing capability may market models made by other factories, while simultaneously manufacturing bicycles in-house.

Only brands or manufacturers that are notable as a bicycle brand should be included in this list. If no page exists for the company or brand, then the page to be linked to should be created first or a reference provided as to its notability or the entry will probably be removed.

== A ==
- Allegro Bikes
- Apollo Bicycles
- Azzurri Bikes

== B ==
- Bair Electric Bikes
- Bastion Cycles
- Baum Cycles

== C ==
- Cleverley Electric Bikes
- Chappelli Cycles
- Ciombola
- Colony BMX
- The Copier Company
- Curve Cycling
- Cyclops

== D ==
- Deubel Bicycles
- Devlin Custom Cycles

== F ==
- FiSHAW E-Bikes
- Forgotten Bike Co.
- Furnari

== G ==
- Gellie Custom Bikes

== H ==
- Healing Cycles
- Hosking Bikes
- HTech Bikes

== I ==
- i am free

== K ==
- Kids Bike Company
- Kumo Cycles

== L ==
- Llewellyn Custom Bicycles

== M ==
- Malvern Star
- Mambo
- Mooro Cycles

== N ==
- NIXEYCLES

== O ==
- Ordica Electric Bicycles

== P ==
- Papillionaire Bicycles
- Penny Farthing Bicycles
- Prova Cycles

== R ==
- Rainbow Cycles
- Reid Cycles
- Repco Sports

== S ==
- Sheppard Cycles
- Single Speed Cycles
- Solar Bike
- Speedwell bicycles

== T ==
- Tiller Rides
- Tribe Bikes

== U ==
- Unicycle.com Australia

== V ==
- Vamos Electric Bikes
- Velosmith
- Vivente
- Vuelo Velo Bicycles

== W ==
- Woods Bicycle Co.
- Wyld Bikes

== Z ==
- Zerode Bikes
- Zoomo

== See also ==
- List of bicycle brands and manufacturing companies
- Manufacturing in Australia
- List of Japanese bicycle brands and manufacturers
