= A.L. Lindsay & Company =

Australian toy manufacturer

- Headquarters: Leichhardt, New South Wales, Australia

A.L. Lindsay & Company, known as A.L. Lindsay & Co. was one of the longest operating toy manufacturing companies in New South Wales. Based in Leichhardt, the company was also known as Lindsay's Toy Factory. Lindsay's was the first Australian company to manufacture children's costumes under licence from Disney and Warner Brothers.

== Establishment ==
Albert Leslie Lindsay (1882–1957) established A.L. Lindsay & Co. in Leichhardt in the 1920s. The company originally manufactured shoe polish and after introducing aprons and feather-dusters a new line of native American "Indian" inspired head-dresses for children in the 1930s inspired Lindsay to specialise in children's costumes and toys, concentrating on 'wild west' outfits. The first factory was located at 90-94 Parramatta Road, Petersham.

== Children's toy manufacturing ==
Lindsay's specialised in fancy dress costumes for boys and girls based mainly on television characters. Lindsay's toy guns and cowboy and Indian outfits together with the Buffalo Bill brand ensured that the ‘wild west’ was part of Australian childhood. Costumes were also based on local television shows such as Skippy, Romper Room and Humphrey B. Bear.

== Development ==
Lindsay's was the first Australian firm to produce costumes under licence from Disney and Warner Brothers. The company opened an additional factory at 5 Foster Street, Leichhardt and in 1968 they moved out of the two factories and into the one establishment, a two-storey factory at 19-25 Beeson Street, Leichhardt.

In 1984, the company, by then trading as Lindsay's Toy Factory, Leichhardt, opened a museum of toys and books.

== See also ==
- Hilarie Lindsay
