= Sheila Blair =

American scholar of Islamic art

- Born: Sheila S. Blair; November 26, 1948 (age 77); Montreal, Quebec, Canada
- Occupations: Art historian Educator
- Spouse: Jonathan M. Bloom (m. 1980)
- Children: 2 (Felicity and Oliver)

Academic background
- Education: Tufts University; Harvard University
- Thesis: The Shrine Complex at Natanz, Iran (1980)

Academic work
- Discipline: Art history
- Sub-discipline: Islamic art Asian art
- Institutions: Boston College; Virginia Commonwealth University

Sheila S. Blair (born November 26, 1948) is a Canadian-born American art historian and educator. Blair has served as the dual Norma Jean Calderwood University Professor of Islamic and Asian Art at Boston College, along with her husband, Jonathan M. Bloom.

== Career ==
Blair received her Bachelor of Arts in Art History and Sociology from Tufts University in 1970. She then continued education by receiving a Doctor of Philosophy in Art History and Middle Eastern Studies from Harvard University in 1980, graduating in the same exact program as her husband, Jonathan M. Bloom, whom she married in that year. Blair's doctoral dissertation was titled "The Shrine Complex at Natanz, Iran."

Following graduation from Tufts, Blair took a one-year position as an instructor of sociology at Shiraz University. After receiving her doctoral degree, she and Bloom were named Aga Khan Lecturers on Islamic Art and Architecture at Harvard University and at the Massachusetts Institute of Technology until 1981. In the following year, Blair was a lecturer at the University of Pennsylvania.

In 2000, Blair and Bloom were named to the dual professorship of Norma Jean Calderwood University Professor of Islamic and Asian Art at Boston College. In that same year, she served as the artistic consultant, with Bloom as principal consultant, for the documentary titled Islam: Empire of Faith. In 2006, they also began holding the joint post of Hamad bin Khalifa Endowed Chair of Islamic Art at Virginia Commonwealth University.

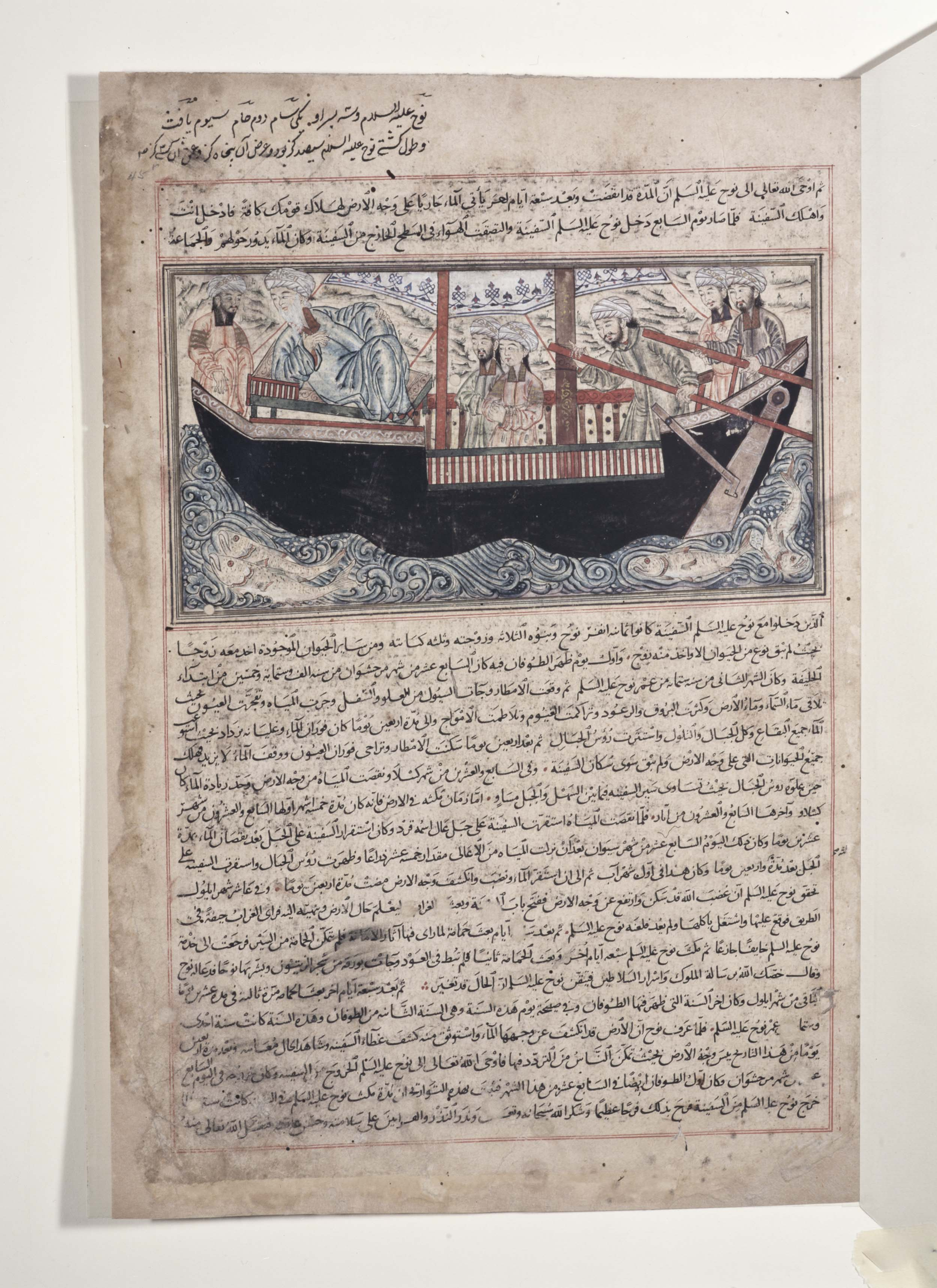
Rashid al-Din's Compendium of Chronicles, subject of a 1995 book by Blair

During the 2014-2015 academic year, Blair and Bloom held a research residency at the Shangri La Museum. The couple retired from teaching in 2018.

== Bibliography ==
Books authored

- The monumental inscriptions from early Islamic Iran and Transoxiana (1992) E.J. Brill OCLC 23017101
- (with Jonathan Bloom) The Art and Architecture of Islam, 1250–1800 (1994) Yale University Press OCLC 29598711
- A compendium of chronicles : Rashid al-Din's illustrated history of the world (1995) The Nour Foundation OCLC 34076057
- Islamic calligraphy (2006) Edinburgh University Press OCLC 56651142
- (with Linda Komaroff) Gifts of the Sultan : the arts of giving at the Islamic courts (2011) Yale University Press OCLC 670483596
- Text and image in medieval Persian art (2014) Edinburgh University Press OCLC 858824780

Books edited

- (with Jonathan Bloom and Sandra Williams) Iranian art from the Sasanians to the Islamic Republic : essays in honour of Linda Komaroff (2024) Edinburgh University Press OCLC 1420625028

Along with Jonathan Bloom, Blair was also the editor for the proceedings of the Biennial Hamad bin Khalifa Symposium on Islamic Art and Culture, published by Yale University Press:

- Rivers of paradise : water in Islamic art and culture (2009) OCLC 317471939
- And Diverse are Their Hues: Color in Islamic Art and Culture (2011) OCLC 1183903828
- God is beautiful and loves beauty : the object in Islamic art and culture (2013) OCLC 1019973633
- God is the light of the heavens and the earth : light in Islamic art and culture (2015) OCLC 909251637
- By the pen and what they write : writing in Islamic art and culture (2017) OCLC 971615736
- Islamic art : past, present, future (2019) OCLC 34076057

Books in honour of Blair

- Robert Hillenbrand (Editor) The making of Islamic art : studies in honour of Sheila Blair and Jonathan Bloom (2021) Edinburgh University Press OCLC 1086567745

== See also ==
- List of Boston College people
- List of Harvard University people
- List of people from Montreal
- List of Tufts University people
