= The Henry Lawson Festival =

Annual arts festival in New South Wales

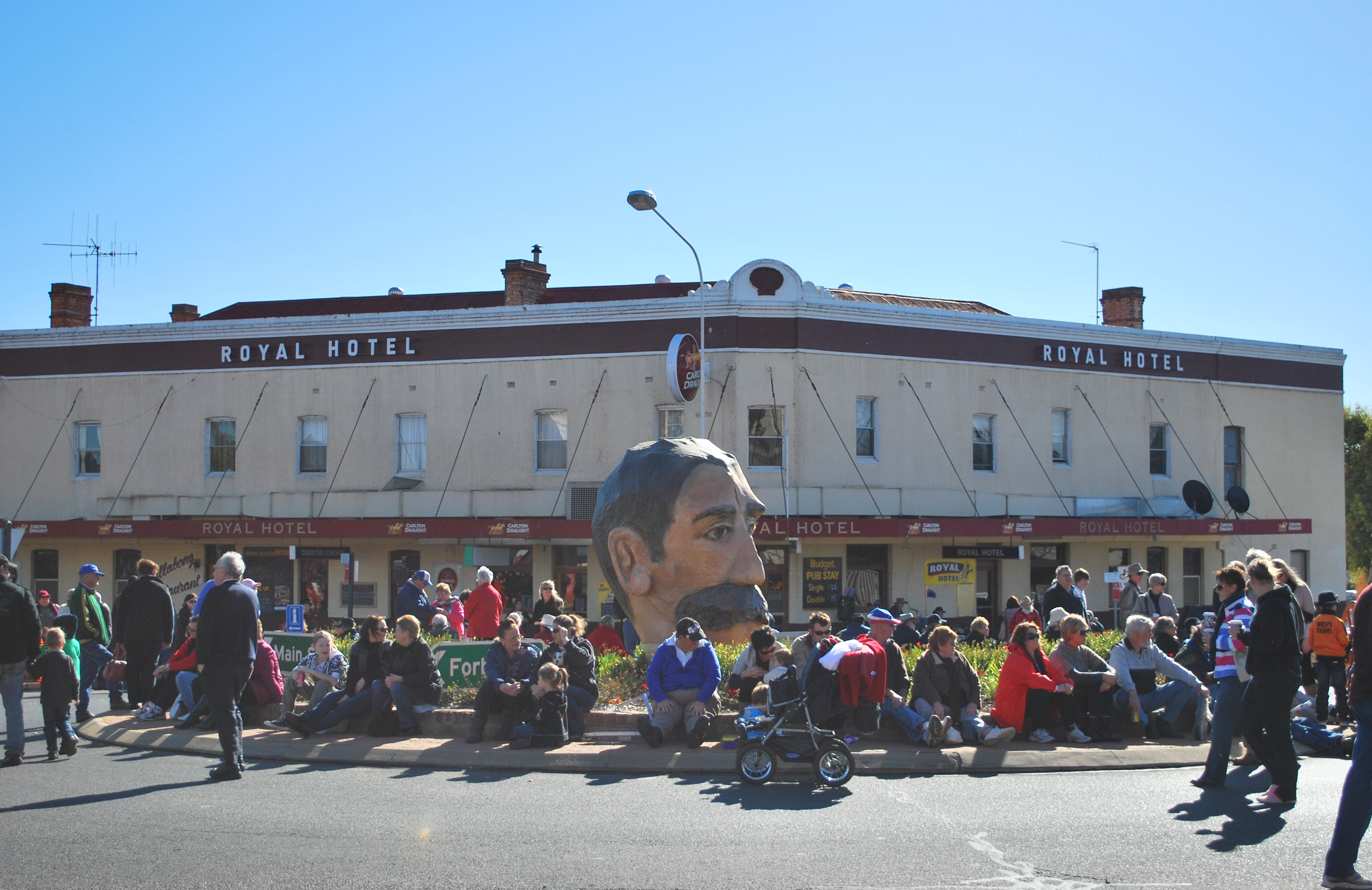
Henry Lawson bust at the 2011 Festival

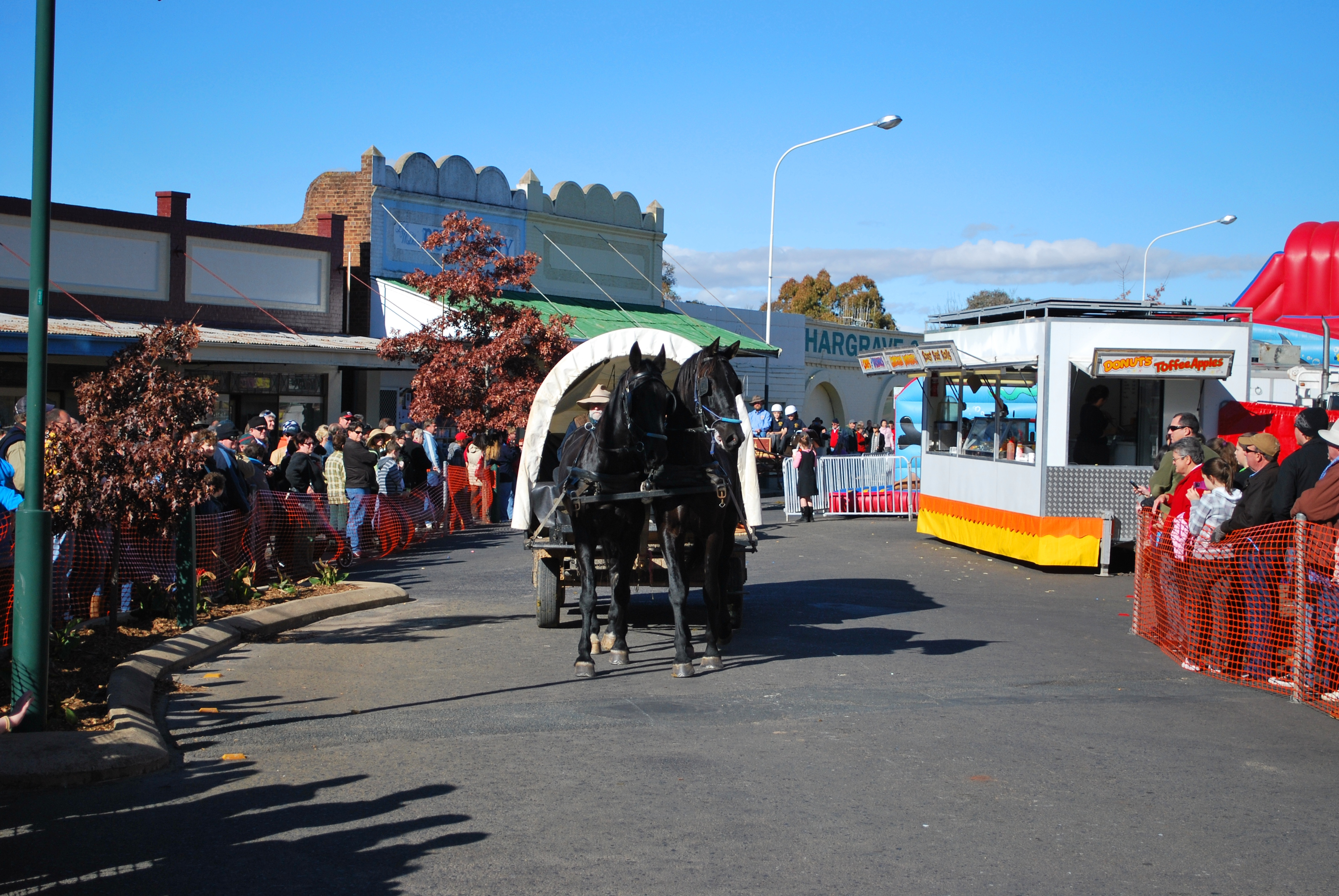
A covered wagon, part of the 2011 Festival parade

The Henry Lawson Festival is an arts festival held annually on the King's birthday weekend in Gulgong and Grenfell, New South Wales, Australia. Henry Lawson, one of Australia's best loved poets and writer of short stories, was born in Grenfell, and he lived in Gulgong for a time as a child. The Festival is one of the longest running arts events in NSW, celebrating its 60th year in 2017 as well as Henry Lawson's 150th birthday, June 17, 2017.

The Festival celebrates poetry, art, and Australian talent. The event includes exhibitions, school events, and plays, as well as a parade, street performers, and a car show. There are competitions in verse, short story, painting and photography. Iandra Castle also opens its doors to the public on the Sunday of the Festival.

Each year the festival hosts an official guest for the weekend. Past guests include Dick Smith, Alan Jones, Judy Nunn, Garry McDonald, Slim Dusty, Bill Peach and Bertha Jago (Henry Lawson's daughter).

Over the last few years the committee has also encouraged those with the name "Henry" (first, middle or last name) to meet at the Henry Lawson statue in Main Street for a group photo.

In 2021 the event was cancelled due to the COVID-19 pandemic in New South Wales.
