= List of Syrians =

This is a list of Syrian people. Entries on this list are demonstrably notable by having a linked current article or reliable sources as footnotes against the name to verify they are notable and identify themselves as Syrian, naturalized as Syrian, or were registered at birth as Syrian.

== Leaders and politicians ==
=== Ancient ===
- Elagabalus – Roman emperor
- Severus Alexander – Roman emperor, the son of Julia Mamaea
- Philip the Arab – Roman emperor
- Julia Domna – Roman empress and mother of Geta and Caracalla.
- Eutropia – Roman empress, mother of Emperor Maxentius and Empresses Fausta and Flavia, the grandmother of Emperors Constantine II, Constans and Constantius II, and the great-grandmother of Emperor Julian and Constantius Gallus.
- Leo III the Syrian – Byzantine emperor and the founder of the Syrian dynasty.
- Constantine V – Byzantine emperor, father of Leo IV the Khazar and grandfather of Constantine VI.
- Leo V the Armenian – Byzantine emperor of Armenian and Syrian origins.
- Cassiodorus – Roman statesman and renowned scholar.
- Avidius Cassius – Roman general and usurper.
- Leontius (usurper)
- Tiberius Claudius Pompeianus – council and military commander, second spouse of Lucilla, and father of Pompeianus.
- Peter Barsymes
- Marinus (praetorian prefect)
- Eutolmius Tatianus
- Florentius
- Mansur ibn Sarjun – Byzantine fiscal official
- Sarjun ibn Mansur – official in the Umayyad Caliphate
- Minervina – wife of Constantine the Great, mother of Crispus.
- Mamertina – concubine of Emperor Licinius and mother of Licinius II
- Sextus Varius Marcellus – was the spouse of Julia Soaemias, he was also praefectus of the military treasury and governor of Numedia.
- Firmus – Usurper during the reign of Aurelian

=== Modern and contemporary ===
- Shukri al-Quwatli (1891–1967) – former President
- Avraham Abaas – Israeli politician who served as a member of the Knesset
- Hashim al-Atassi – former President
- Ahmed al-Sharaa - political leader
- Nazim al-Kudsi – former President
- Rushdi al-Kikhya – statesman and political leader
- Fares al-Khoury – statesman and former prime minister
- Bashar al-Assad - former President
- Hafez al-Assad – former President
- Abdul Halim Khaddam – former President and former Vice President
- Subhi Barakat – former President
- Lu'ay al-Atassi – former President
- Nureddin al-Atassi – former President
- Haqqi al-Azm – former prime minister
- Khalid al-Azm – former prime minister
- Maarouf al-Dawalibi – former prime minister
- Sultan al-Atrash – General of the Great Syrian Revolution
- Yusuf al-Azmah – former Minister of Defense
- Victor Atiyeh – 32nd governor of Oregon
- Bashir Azmeh – former prime minister
- Rashad Barmada – former Minister of Defense
- Robert Cahaly – political consultant and founder of the Trafalgar Group
- Husni al-Za'im – former president
- Amin al-Hafiz – former president
- Mitch Daniels – 49th Governor of Indiana
- Khalil Eideh – Australian politician
- Yitzhak Galanti (1937–2012) – Israeli politician who served as a member of the Knesset
- Ibrahim Hananu – leader of the revolution (northern area) against French Mandate (1921–1929)
- Yisrael Hasson (born 1955) - Israeli politician and Deputy Director of Shin Bet
- Mikhail Ilyan – former Minister of Foreign Affairs
- Ahmed Kuftaro – former Grand Mufti of Syria, 1964–2004
- Stella Levy (1924–1999) – Israeli soldier and member of the Knesset
- Carlos Menem – former President of Argentina
- Muhammad Mustafa Mero – former prime minister
- Muhammad Naji al-Otari – prime minister
- Eliyahu Sasson (1902–1978) - Israeli member of the Knesset and minister
- Farouq al-Sharaa – diplomat, former foreign minister from 1984 to 2006, and vice-president since 2006
- Tareck El Aissami – Venezuelan Syrian politician serving as Minister of Industries and National Production since 14 June 2018
- Levon Ter-Petrosyan - first president of Armenia
- Menachem Yedid (1918–2013) - Israeli politician who served as a member of the Knesset
- Mahmoud Zuabi – former prime minister

== Scholars and scientists ==
- Abraham ben Mazhir (died c. 1160) – head of the remnant of the Palestinian Gaonate in Damascus in the first half of the 12th century

=== Modern and contemporary ===
- Martín Abadi – Argentine computer scientist; inventor of Baby Modula-3, and co-developer of Burrows–Abadi–Needham logic
- Hanna Abboud – author, critic, translator, and mythographer
- Huda Akil – Syrian-American neuroscientist; known for discovering the role of endorphins in the human brain
- Jorge Bucay – Argentine gestalt psychotherapist, psychodramatist, and writer
- Frank Harary – American mathematician, considered one of the fathers of modern graph theory
- Jerrier A. Haddad – American co-developer and designer of the IBM 701 series which was IBM’s first commercial scientific computer and its first mass-produced mainframe computer
- Shadia Habbal – Syrian-American astronomer and physicist; played a key role in establishing the NASA Parker Solar Probe
- Hunein Maassab – Syrian-American professor of epidemiology; known for developing the Live attenuated influenza vaccine
- Kefah Mokbel, FRCS – lead breast surgeon at the London Breast Institute of The Princess Grace Hospital; professor of Breast Cancer Surgery (The Brunel Institute of Cancer Genetics and Pharmacogenomics) Brunel University London
- Sol Picciotto (born 1942) – British academic, emeritus professor of law at Lancaster University
- Jorge Sahade – Argentine astronomer, first Latin American President of the International Astronomical Union
- Dennis W. Sciama – English physician, considered one of the fathers of modern cosmology
- Oussama Khatib – roboticist and professor of Computer Science at Stanford University; received the IEEE RAS for Distinguished Service Award (2013)
- Mario Hamuy – Chilean Professor of Astronomy at the University of Chile
- Dina Katabi – director of the Massachusetts Institute of Technology Wireless Center
- Rolando Chuaqui – Chilean mathematician, spearheaded the creation and expansion of mathematics departments across multiple Chilean universities
- Charles Issawi – economist and historian of the Middle East at Columbia University and Princeton University
- Raphael of Brooklyn – first Orthodox bishop to be consecrated in North America
- Malatius Jaghnoon – epigrapher and founder of the archaeological society in Homs
- Afif Bahnassi – art historian and curator
- Aref Dalila – economist, political activist and former political prisoner
- Fawwaz T. Ulaby – professor of electrical engineering and computer science at the University of Michigan; he designed the world's first radar to fly in space
- A. R. Frank Wazzan – Professor, and Dean Emeritus, of the UCLA Samueli School of Engineering, UCLA

== Writers, poets and authors ==
- Hanna Abboud – author, critic, translator, and mythographer
- Ziad Abdullah – novelist and screenwriter
- Mary Ajami
- Khairy Alzahaby – writer, novelist, scenarist, historian, thinker
- Nasib Arida
- Aziz Azmeh – author and philosopher
- Abdulkarim Baderkhan (born 1986) – poet, translator, critic
- Hanna Diyab
- Sadiq Jalal al-Azm – author, philosopher, sociologist and human rights advocate
- Ali Ahmad Said Esber – popularly known as Adonis, a Syrian poet, essayist and translator
- Morad Daoud – novelist, sculptor
- Abd al-Masih Haddad
- Qustaki al-Himsi
- Adib Ishaq
- Riad Ismat – writer, director
- Amal Kassir – American spoken word poet
- Khaled Khalifa – novelist
- Mohammed Maghout – poet and writer
- Francis Marrash
- Abu Khalil Qabbani – playwright, "father of Syrian theatre"
- Nizar Qabbani – poet
- Widad Sakakini (1913–1991) – writer and feminist
- Fathallah Saqqal – lawyer, writer, government minister
- Mona Simpson (born 1957) – Syrian American novelist and essayist
- Muhammad al-Tunji – linguist, and author; received Indian Prize from UNESCO in 1970
- Riad Sattouf – French cartoonist, comic artist, film director
- Amnon Shamosh (1929–2022) – Israeli author and poet
- Zakariyya Tamer – writer
- Dima Wannous – author and journalist
- Saadallah Wannous – playwright

== Businesspeople ==
- Steve Jobs – American co-founder of Apple and Pixar
- Joseph Safra – formerly the richest banker in the world
- Joseph Nakash – American billionaire businessman
- Ghassan Aboud – billionaire entrepreneur
- Shafiq Ades – businessman who was the wealthiest Jew in Iraq
- Mohed Altrad – French-Syrian billionaire
- Waleed Al Zoubi – billionaire founder of Tiger Group construction company
- Ayman Asfari – Syrian-British billionaire businessman; former CEO of Petrofac.
- Gilbert Bigio – Haiti's only billionaire and founder of GB Group
- Adnan Khashoggi - Saudi billionaire businessman and arms dealer; his mother, Samiha, was of Syrian origin
- Salha "Mama" Bobo (1907–2001) – Syrian-American businesswoman and philanthropist
- Joseph Cayre – American billionaire
- Michel Chalhoub – Syrian-French billionaire businessman; founder of the Chalhoub Group
- Fuad Char – Colombian businessman, retailer, and politician, his family owns as many as 91 businesses with assets worth $2 billion
- Dov Charney – Canadian entrepreneur and founder of American Apparel in addition to Los Angeles Apparel
- Stanley Chera – American billionaire real estate developer
- Simon Halabi – Syrian-born British former billionaire property developer
- Assad John Haloute – founder of Chefette, the largest fast food restaurant chain based in Barbados
- George Haswani – Syrian-Russian businessman who owns the HESCO natural gas production company
- Jack Hidary – American technologist
- Elie Horn (born 1944) – Brazilian billionaire and founder of Cyrela Brazil Realty, Brazil's largest homebuilder and real estate company by revenue and market value
- Reed Jobs – American venture capitalist
- Adnan Kivan – multi-millionaire and owner of Kyiv Post
- Marcus Lemonis — businessman and philanthropist; chairman and CEO of Camping World, and Good Sam Enterprises
- Ijad Madisch – German founder and CEO of ResearchGate
- Ronald Mourad – chairman of The Portland Trust and Bridges Ventures
- Jose Mugrabi – billionaire art dealer
- David Nahmad – billionaire and former art dealer
- Ezra Nahmad – billionaire art collector and dealer
- Mansour Ojjeh – billionaire entrepreneur, son of Akram Ojjeh
- Ghaith Pharaon – founder of Attock Group and Attock Cement
- Isaac Saba Raffoul – Mexican billionaire businessman
- Jaquesse Saadé – French billionaire of paternal Syrian ancestry; founder of CMA CGM, the world’s third largest container shipping company.
- Edmond Safra – billionaire banker
- Jacob Safra – banker and patriarch of the Safra family
- Moise Safra – billionaire banker
- Jeff Sutton – billionaire New York real estate developer and the founder of Wharton Properties
- Joseph Matalon – richest billionaire in Jamaica, his father came from Damascus.
- Ronaldo Mouchawar – entrepreneur, founder of Souq.com
- Fouad al-Zayat – billionaire businessman and gambler
- Moutaz Al-Khayyat – Syrian-Qatari billionaire businessman, co-founder of Power International Holding and Baladna, along with his brother Ramez Al-Khayyat
- Mazen Al-Tarazi – Syrian-Canadian businessman
- Talal Abu-Ghazaleh – founder of an eponymous organization, Talal is dubbed as the godfather of Arab accounting; his mother was from Damascus
- Ayah Bdeir – Canadian entrepreneur; founder of LittleBits
- Sadad Al Husseini – former Executive Vice President for Exploration and Producing at Saudi Aramco
- Omar Hamoui – founder of AdMob
- Wafic Said – Syrian-Saudi-Canadian billionaire businessman
- Joseph Sitt – American real estate investor, founder of Thor Equities
- Mustafa Suleyman – British CEO of Microsoft AI; co-founder of Deepmind and Inflection AI
- Roger Tamraz – billionaire banker and venture capitalist
- Sam Yagan – American Internet entrepreneur

== Actors/actresses ==
- Murray Abraham – American actor and winner of the Academy Award
- Ivonne Attas (born 1943) – Syrian-born Venezuelan telenovela soap opera actress and politician
- Yasser Azmeh – comedian and director
- Teri Hatcher – American actress and singer, she has Syrian ancestry from her mother's side.
- Wentworth Miller – American actor and screenwriter, he has Syrian ancestry from his mother's side.
- Abbas al-Noury – actor
- Samer al-Masry – actor
- Bassam Kousa – actor
- Mounir Fakhry Abdel Nour – actor
- Lilia al-Atrash – actress
- Marwan Farhat – actor
- Raghda Khateb – actress
- Ayman Al-Salek – actor
- Adel Abo Hassoon – actor
- Jumana Murad – actress
- Anjy Al-Yousif – actress
- Yahya Al-Kafri – actor
- Hisham Kafarneh – actor
- Elisa Sednaoui – actress, model, and entrepreneur
- Bouthayna Shaya – actress
- Vic Tayback – actor
- Muna Wassef – actress

== Archaeologists ==
- Khaled al-Asaad – former director of antiquities in Palmyra, brutally beheaded by Daesh
- Raoul Gregory Vitale – born in Latakia

== Architects ==
- Nazih Kawakibi – architect, professor of architecture, and historian of Damascus
- Khaled Malas – architect and art historian
- Moshe Safdie – designer of Marina Bay Sands and Jewel Changi Airport
- Apollodorus of Damascus – Roman architect, 2nd century

== Artists and designers ==
- Youssef Abdelke – artist
- Darin Ahmad – artist, poet, writer
- Manal Ajaj – fashion designer
- Odette Barsa – fashion designer
- Ali Farzat – cartoonist
- Jamal Joratil –painter
- Marwan Kassab-Bachi – painter
- Louay Kayali – cartoonist
- Fateh Moudarres – painter

== Athletes ==
- Kareem Al Allaf (born 1998) – American tennis player of Syrian descent who has played for Syria and the US
- Flamma – gladiator
- Kelly Slater – American professional surfer
- Jamal Murray – Canadian NBA basketball player
- Brandon Saad – American professional ice hockey player
- Joseph Atiyeh – wrestler and silver medalist at the 1984 Olympic Games
- Zid Abou Hamed – Australian-Syrian athlete
- Ahed Joughili – weightlifter
- Michael Madanly – basketball player
- Feras Saied – bodybuilder
- Yasser Seirawan – chess grandmaster and four-time US-champion
- Ghada Shouaa – heptathlete and gold medalist at the 1996 Olympic Games
- Sami Zayn – Canadian wrestler

=== Boxers ===
- Mustafa Hamsho – Boxer
- Manuel Charr - Boxer
- Naser Al Shami – Boxer
- Yaser Shigan – Boxer

=== Footballers ===
- Basel Abdoulfattakh, Russian
- Jehad Al Hussain
- Firas Al Khatib
- Mahmoud Al-Mawas
- Omar Al Somah
- Wael Ayan
- Imad Chhadeh, Swedish
- Ninos Gouriye, Dutch
- Aatef Jenyat
- Dani Kiki, Bulgarian
- Sanharib Malki
- Ilyas Merkes
- Louay Chanko
- George Mourad
- Christer Youssef, Swedish
- Abdul Fattah Al Agha
- Ibrahim Alma
- Zyad Chaabo
- Oliver Kass Kawo

== Criminals ==
- Monzer al-Kassar – international arms dealer

== Film directors ==
- Abdellatif Abdelhamid
- Moustapha Akkad, Syrian-American
- Omar Amiralay
- Talal Derki
- Mohammad Malas
- Ossama Mohammed
- Feras Fayyad

== Musicians ==
- Bob Marley – born to a family of Syrian Jewish origin
- Paula Abdul – singer, dancer, choreographer, actress, and television personality
- Asmahan – original name: Princess Amal Al Atrash, singer, sister of Farid Al Atrash
- Farid al-Atrash – composer, singer and oud player
- Fahd Ballan – traditional singer
- Kinan Azmeh – clarinetist
- Lena Chamamyan – singer
- Sabah Fakhri – traditional singer
- Fayrouz Al Halabiya (1895–1955) – singer
- Malek Jandali – composer and pianist
- Assala Nasri – singer, actress
- Rasha Risk – singer
- Nejmi Succari – violinist
- George Wassouf – singer, actor
- Bachar Zarkan – musician, singer, actor
- Mayada El Hennawy – singer
- XXXTentacion – rapper, singer, songwriter

== Former political prisoners and prisoners of conscience ==
- Ali al-Abdallah – writer and human rights activist
- Michel Kilo – writer, political prisoner
- Haytham Manna – writer, spent three decades as a human rights activist
- Haitham al-Maleh – human rights activist and former judge
- Riad al-Turk – prominent Syrian opposition leader, former political prisoner for about 20 years in Syria
- Omar Alshogre - human rights activist, survivor of Sednaya prison, and a Georgetown University student
- Mazen al-Hamada - human rights activist and oil and gas technician

== Miscellaneous ==
- Michel Aflaq – political theorist
- Vatche Arslanian – International Red Cross
- Tawfiq Bay – traveler, military leader, and politician
- Mazhir ben Abraham (died after 1191) – senior member of the remnant of the Palestinian Gaonate in Damascus, a cantor, and a liturgical poet
- Muzna Dureid – activist
- Aref Dalila – economist, Damascus Spring figure
- Hala Gorani – American reporter
- Sireen Hamsho – renewable energy specialist
- Abdul-Nabi Isstaif – critic, a scholar of comparative literature and Orientalism
- Ahmad Joudeh – ballet dancer
- Jack Marshall – poet and author
- Osama Al-Samman – civil society activist
- Sami Zayn – professional wrestler

== See also ==
- List of people by nationality
- List of Arab Americans
- List of Arab Canadians
- List of Syrian artists
