= Muhammad: The Last Prophet =

2002 American religious epic film

- Promotional film poster
- Directed by: Richard Rich
- Written by: Brian Nissen
- Produced by: Richard Rich; Terry L. Noss; Thomas J. Tobin; Mowafak El-Harthy
- Starring: Eli Allem; Nicholas Kadi
- Narrated by: Brian Nissen
- Edited by: Joe Campana
- Music by: William Kidd
- Production company: RichCrest Animation Studios
- Distributed by: Fine Media Group; Badr International
- Release date: 2002
- Running time: 95 minutes
- Countries: United States; Egypt; Lebanon
- Languages: English; Arabic; Turkish; Malay

Muhammad: The Last Prophet is a 2002 American animated religious epic film, produced by Badr International and directed by Richard Rich. The movie was released in limited cinemas in the United States and the United Kingdom. The film focuses on the early days of Islam and Muhammad.

In accordance with Islamic law and tradition, Muhammad and the first four caliphs (Abu Bakr, Umar, Uthman, and Ali) are not depicted in the film or any of its prequels. Scenes that include Muhammad are shown from his perspective, with his words paraphrased by the narrator. The film has been approved by the Council of Al-Azhar Al-Shareef (Islamic Research Academy in Egypt) and the Supreme Islamic Shiite Council of Lebanon.

All of the characters, such as the main character Malek and the rest of his family, are fictional.

The film has been dubbed into several languages including Arabic, French, Turkish and Malay. The dialogue of the Arabic version differs from the English version of the film, with the dialogue of the Arabic version being more consistent with and similar to traditional Islamic historical narratives.

== Plot ==
The film follows Muhammad's first years as a prophet starting with Islam's beginnings in Mecca in which the Muslims are persecuted, the exodus to Medina, and ending with the Muslims' triumphant return to Mecca. A number of crucial events, such as the Battle of Badr, the Battle of Uhud, the Battle of the Trench, and the Conquest of Mecca are depicted.

== Consultant ==
- Khaled Abou El Fadl
- Sheikh Ayman Jabalagi
- John Esposito

== Cast ==
List of cast members and characters of this film, as well as the prequels:

=== Fictional characters ===
- Brian Nissen as Malek (Arabic version: Bassam Kousa as old and Mansour Salti as young)
- Catherine Lavin as Arwa (Arabic version: Laura Abou Assaad)
- Tiffany Johnson as Siham (Arabic version: Bahla Hegazy)
- Mark Hunt as Jahm (Arabic version: Muhammad Mustafi)
- Catherine Lavin as Jalilah (Arabic version: Thara Debsi)
- Lauren Shaffel as Huda (Arabic version: Youmna Halabi)
- Anthony Micheal Jr. as Hadi (Arabic version: Muhammad Al-Arabi Tarqan)
- D. Hunter White as Amahl

=== Historical figures ===
- Jerome Dixon as Bilal (Arabic version: Hisham Kafarneh)
- Jacob Livingston as Ammar (Arabic version: Kamal Al-Bunni)
- Mark Hunt as Ja`far
- Spencer Beglarain as Bara'
- C.S. Berkley as Hamza (Arabic version: Muḥammad ʿĀrif As-Saʿīd)
- Anthony Mozdy as Salman
- C.S. Berkley as Yasir
- Eli Allem as Abu Talib (Old) (Arabic version Mohammed Yasin)
- James Simon as Abu Talib
- Anthony Dee as Abu Talib (Young)
- Leon Morenzie as Negus, King of Abyssinia
- David Francis as Abdul-Muttalib
- Jake Palmer as Abdullah
- Brian Micheal as Harith (Arabic version: Muhammad Hadaki)
- Nicholas Kadi as Abu Sufyan (Arabic version: Marwan Farhat)
- Richard Epcar as Abu Jahl (Arabic version: Mamoun Al Rifai)
- David Llewellyn as Abu Lahab (Arabic version: Zeyad Errafae'ie)
- Donal O' Sullivan as Umayyah (Arabic version: Muhammad Kharmasho)
- Bob Johnson as `Amr (Arabic version:Tayseer Idrees)
- Robert Cotterell as Khalid (Arabic version: Yahya Alkafri)
- Brian Nissen as Suhayl
- Donal O' Sullivan as Waraqah
- Lawrence Ross as Walid (Arabic version: Yusuf Al-Muqbil)
- Patrick Grayson as Abraham
- Mary-Louise Gemmill as Sumayyah (Arabic version: Amal Omran)
- Henrietta Carol as Hind
- Allison Yale as Nusaybah
- Kat Cressida as Asma'
- Lindy Allison as Fatimah
- Catherine Lavin as Aminah

=== Arabic version additional voices ===
- Anjy Al-Yousif
- Fadwa Souleimane
- Mofeed Abu Hamda

== Prequels ==
Three short prequels were released in 2012, all directed by Rich:

- Before the Light (relating to events in Arabia before the birth of Muhammad, with his grandfather, Abdul-Muttalib, as the main character) on 24 July 2012
- Salman the Persian (the story of Salman's quest for religious enlightenment) on 24 July 2012
- Great Women of Islam (pertaining to the roles of women in Arabia before and after the birth of Islam) on 24 July 2012

== Reception ==
On Metacritic, the film has a score of 47% based on reviews from 4 critics.

Dana Stevens of The New York Times gave it 3 out of 5 and wrote: "Faithful to Islamic law's prohibition against representing its title character, this movie gives a prophet's-eye-view on the story." Maitland McDonagh of TV Guide gave it 2 out of 5 and described it as: "firmly within the long tradition of bland, upbeat and earnest religious instructional films."

== See also ==
- List of Islamic films
- List of animated Islamic films
- List of films about Muhammad
