= Malatius Jaghnoon =

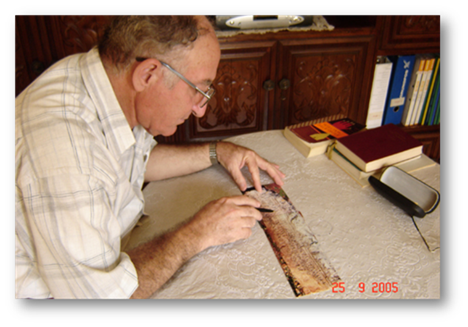
- Jaghnoon working on an inscription
- Born: Malatius Jibriel Jaghnoon; 1943 (age 82–83); Lattakia, Syria
- Education: University of Aleppo
- Occupations: Epigrapher, civil engineer
- Known for: Head of the archaeological society in Homs

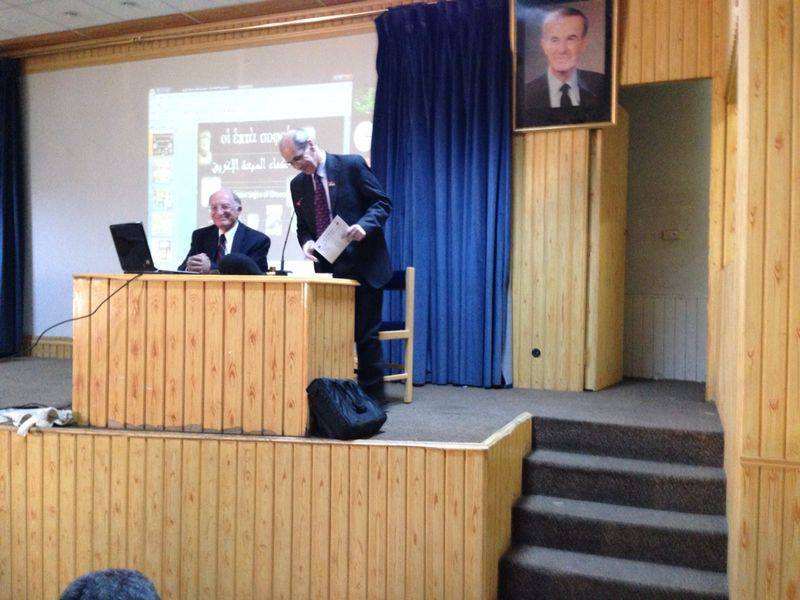
Jaghnoon giving a lecture titled "The Seven Sages (of Greece) or Seven Wise Men" in Homs 2015

Malatius Jibriel Jaghnoon, (Arabic: ملاتيوس جبرائيل جغنون, born in Lattakia 1943), is a Syrian engineer and epigrapher specialized in Aramaic and Greek inscriptions.

== Career ==
He was born in Syria to a Greek Orthodox family. He graduated as a civil engineer from the University of Aleppo in 1968. His interest in epigraphy led him to learn several ancient languages and he mastered Aramaic and Greek among others. Jaghnoon is also an expert in the Ancient South Arabian script. His epigraphical work inside Syria includes the deciphering of an inscription found on a Roman era sarcophagus from Homs, a number of Syriac and Greek inscriptions from an ancient church in Tal Eltiten, an inscription from Maarrat al-Nu'man and an inscription from the agora of Palmyra. He is a founding member of The Archaeological Society of Homs and was elected as head of the society in 2011.

== Selected publications ==
- Jaghnoon, Malatius (2019). "Greek Inscribed Mosaics From The Church Floor In ῾Uqerbat, Central Syria". Canadian Centre for Epigraphic Documents Journal. 1 (2). Canadian Centre for Epigraphic Documents, Department of Near and Middle Eastern Civilizations. University of Toronto.
- Jaghnoon, Malathios (2009). Al-Maqdissi, Michel (ed.). "Note à propos des symboles de la mosaïque de l'église de Taybet el- Imam". Studia Orontica (in Arabic). 6. Bulletin du Centre Syrien de la Recherches Archéologique, Vallé de Oronte, Palais Tabet. OCLC 717465740.
- Jaghnoon, Malathios (2009). Al-Maqdissi, Michel (ed.). "Note sur quatre sarcophages trouvés à Homs en 2006". Studia Orontica (in Arabic). 6. Bulletin du Centre Syrien de la Recherches Archéologique, Vallé de Oronte, Palais Tabet. OCLC 717465740.
- Jaghnoon, Malathios (2009). Al-Maqdissi, Michel (ed.). "Note sur les noms anciens de l'Oronte et leurs significations". Studia Orontica (in Arabic). 6. Bulletin du Centre Syrien de la Recherches Archéologique, Vallé de Oronte, Palais Tabet. OCLC 717465740.
- Jaghnoon, Malathios (2010). Al-Maqdissi, Michel (ed.). "Les inscriptions grecques conservées à Mishirfeh". Studia Orontica (in Arabic). 7–8. Bulletin du Centre Syrien de la Recherches Archéologique, Vallé de Oronte, Palais Tabet. OCLC 717465740.
- Jaghnoon, Malatius (2010). al-Qayyim, 'Ali (ed.). "الشام والشآم ودمشق وسورية: ما هي معانيها اللفظية (al-Sham and al-Sha'am and Damascus and Syria: What are its Pronunciational Meanings)" (PDF). Al-Maʻrifa (in Arabic). 559. Syrian Ministry of Culture. OCLC 727093734.
- Jaghnoon, Malatius (2010). "الحضور السرياني التاريخي في كنيسة الروم الأرثوذكس (The Historical Syriac Presence in the Greek Orthodox Church of Antioch)". The Patriarchal Journal (Syriac Orthodox Patriarchal Journal) (in Arabic). 48. Syriac Orthodox Patriarchate of Antioch and All the East. ISSN 2414-6986. OCLC 36883607.
