= Boutheina =

Boutheina (also spelled Bothayna or Buthaina; Arabic: بثينة) is an Arabic given name for females. The name means beautiful and tender. The name got its fame from the true love story of Jameel Buthaina and his Arabic poems detailing his love and her beauty.

People with the name include:

- Boutheina Jabnoun Marai, Tunisian journalist
- Bouthaina Shaaban, Syrian politician
- Bouthayna Shaya, Syrian actress and voice actress
- Buthaina Al-Yaqoubi, Omani athlete
