= Fatih Sultan Muhammad =

Fatih Sultan Mehmet (Original)
- Distributed by: ella
- Release date: 1983
- Running time: 113 minutes
- Country: Turkey
- Language: Turkish

Fatih Sultan Muhammad is a feature-length animated film about the Fall of Constantinople to Ottoman Sultan Muhammad II, narrated from the Ottoman perspective.

The original film was in Turkish – an English translation was produced by Astrolabe Pictures , a small firm based in Herndon, Virginia marketing films to American Muslims. This film talks about the struggles the Turkish people had faced in order to conquer Constantinople (Istanbul).

== See also ==
- List of Islamic films
- List of animated Islamic films
- The Boy and the King
- The Jar: A Tale From the East
