= List of Islam-related animated films =

This is a list of animated films, television serials and programmes related to Islamic civilisation, i.e. Islam, Islamic history and Islamic culture.

== Short films ==
- 1001 Inventions and the World of Ibn Al-Haytham (2015), on medieval Muslim scientist Ibn al-Haytham.
- Who Won? (2018), on boxer Muhammad Ali by Aisha Selime Coskun.

== Films ==
=== Religious ===
- The Boy and the King (Egypt, 1992) a retelling of the story of the People of the Ditch (described in Surah Al-Buruj and Prophetic traditions).
- Bilal: A New Breed of Hero (UAE, 2015) a retelling of the story of Bilal ibn Rabah, a companion of the Prophet and first Muezzin in Islam.

==== Badr International ====
- Muhammad: The Last Prophet (2002), the classic children's retelling of the life of the Last Prophet Muhammad.
- Before the Light (2012), relating to events in Arabia before the birth of Muhammad, with his grandfather, Abdul-Muttalib, as the main character.
- Great Women of Islam (2012), describing the roles of women in Arabia before and after the birth of Islam.
- Salman the Persian (2012), a retelling of the beloved story of Salman's quest for religious enlightenment.

=== Islamic history ===
- Fatih Sultan Muhammad (Turkey, 1983) on the Conquest of Constantinople by Ottoman Sultan Mehmet II.
- God's Faithful Servant: Barla (Turkey, 2011) on the life of Bediüzzaman Said Nursi.
- Princess of Rome (Iran, 2015) on the life of Nargis Khatoon, mother-to-be of Muhammad al-Mahdi, the 12th Shia Imam.

=== Islamic culture ===
- The Jar: A Tale From the East (Syria, 2001)
- The Breadwinner (2017)

== Television/Web Series ==
=== JCC & Cairo Cartoon ===
- Men Qasas Al Saleheen (English: from the tales of the Righteous), a series telling the stories of famous righteous people
- Olamaa Al Moslemin (English: Muslim Scientists), the biopic series of muslim scientists
- Men Qasas Et Tabiin (English: from the biography of the Successors), the series features the biography of multiple Tabiun

=== Cedars Art Production ===
- Women Stories from Qur'an
- Animal Stories from Holy Qur'an
- Human Stories from Qur'an
- Marvellous Stories from Qur'an
- Verses Stories from Qur'an

=== Cartoonile & One Way Production ===
- Imam Bukhari Series
- هذا هو الاسلام (English subtitles available): 30 short stories about Events that took place in different periods throughout history

=== ATA Animation Studios ===
- Habib Allah, a 3-season television series featuring the biography of Muhammad.
- Joseph Alsideeq, a series featuring his life story
- Kaleem Allah, a 3-season television series featuring the biography of Moses.
- Khalil Allah, a tv series featuring Ibrahim.
- Noah, a series featuring his life story.
- Solaiman Al Hakeem, a television series that revolves around the story of Solomon
- El Kahf, the series tells the stories in Surah Al-Kahf (Quran, chapter 18)

=== Muslim Kids TV ===
- Al Qasas, a retelling of the stories of the quran in a manner catered to children.
- Mama and Lulu, a television series following Lulu and her mother on a journey of learning and ethics.
- Lulu around the world, follows Lulu around the world as she shares interesting facts, history and Landmarks.

=== Hakma Muslim Kids Reader ===
- Abdullah, Abdullah did not like to listen to his mom, he just wanted to play video games all day. He became selfish. But, one day, he found out something shocking! He started to change himself.
- The Fortune Teller, a story about a mysterious lady - who claimed she had the superpower of telling the future! and about an intelligent girl Zara, who finally proved that the mysterious lady had no superpower!

=== Other Notables ===
- Adam's World, television series using Muppets to teach children good Islamic morals and values.
- One4Kids: Zaky & Friends
- Saladin: The Animated Series (Malaysia, 2009) on Saladin and the Crusades.
- Ibn Battuta: The Animated Series (Malaysia, 2010) on the travels of Ibn Battuta.
- Burka Avenger (Pakistan, 2013)
- Rijal Hawla ArRasul (men around the prophet, series by MBC 3 on Sahaba)

== See also ==
- List of Islamic films
- Muhammad in film
