= The Elephant King (2017 film) =

- Film poster
- Written by: Mohammad Bagher Mofidikia, Ali Ramezan, Hadi Mohammadian
- Produced by: Hamed Jafari
- Starring: Saeed Sheikhzade; Bahram Zand; Naser Tahmasb; Mirtaher Mazloomi; Shokat Hojjat; Zohre Shokoofande; Hamed Azizi; George Petrosi; Bahman Hashemi; Akbar Manafi; Shayan Shambiati
- Edited by: Hassan Ayoubi
- Music by: Sattar Oraki
- Production company: HonarPooya Group
- Distributed by: HonarPooya Group
- Release date: December 14, 2017
- Running time: 80 minutes
- Country: Iran
- Languages: Persian and English and Arabic
- Box office: US$2.51 million

The Elephant King (Persian: فیلشاه) is a 2017 Iranian animated feature film created by HonarPooya Animation Company. This is the second animated feature film of HonarPooya Animation Company after Princess of Rome. Hamed Jafari was the producer, Hadi Muhammadian was director, Mohammad Bagher Mofidikia, Ali Ramezan, Hadi Mohammadian were members of Writing Team and Sattar Oraki was Composer of the film.

== Story ==
The story revolves around the society of elephants in a jungle in Africa. Shadphil (the elephant king's son) is supposed to rule the society after his father.

== Production ==
A group of Iranian voice artists took part in this work. Bahram Zand, Naser Tahmasb, Mirtaher Mazloomi, Shokat Hojjat, Zohre Shokoofande, Hamed Azizi, George Petrosi, Bahman Hashemi, Akbar Manafi and Shayan Shambiati supervised by Saeed Sheikhzade dubbed this animation.

== Release ==
The Elephant King was the only animation participated in Fajr International Film Festival held in Tehran in February 2018.

== See also ==
- Smart Kid
- Princess of Rome
