= Ali Saad (actor) =

Lebanese actor and voice actor

- علي سعد
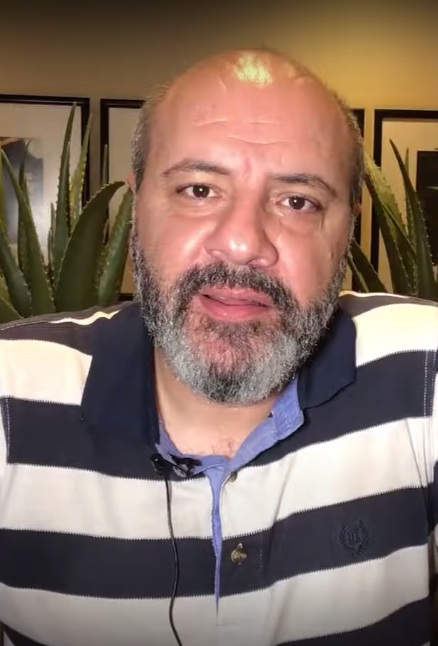
- Ali Saad, August 2019
- Occupations: Actor, voice actor

Ali Saad (Arabic: علي سعد) is a Lebanese actor and voice actor.

== Filmography ==
=== Film ===
- Princess of Rome - Voice only. 2015
- Magic Bottle - Voice only. 2016
- Karun Treasure - Voice only. 2016

=== Television ===
Year	Title	Role	Source
1977	Olya w Issam		
2011-2012	Al Ghaliboun		
2011	Cello		
2013	Qiyamat Al Banadiq	Abd al-Husayn Sharaf al-Din	
2014	Bab Almorad	Ali al-Ridha	
2015	Ain El Jawza	Ismail	
2015	Darb Al-Yasamin	Yasin	

=== Dubbing roles ===
- A Bug's Life - Hopper (Classical Arabic version)
- Atlantis: Milo's Return (Classical Arabic version)
- Atlantis: The Lost Empire - Commander Lyle Tiberius Rourke (Classical Arabic version)
- Dexter's Laboratory
- The Men of Angelos
- WALL-E - M-O and John (Classical Arabic version)
- Princess of Rome
- Prophet Joseph - Malik ibn Zaar
- Kick Buttowski: Suburban Daredevil - Harold Buttowski (Classical Arabic Version)
