= Mohammad Al Attar =

Syrian playwright (born 1980)

- محمد العطار
- Born: 1980 (age 45–46); Damascus, Syria
- Education: University of Damascus; Higher Institute for Dramatic Arts, Damascus; Goldsmiths, University of London
- Occupations: Playwright, dramaturg
- Known for: Syrian war literature, political theater
- Notable work: Withdrawal, Could You Please Look into the Camera, Iphigenia, The Trojan Women, Antigone of Shatila, Damascus 2045, A Chance Encounter

Mohammad Al Attar (Arabic: محمد العطار; born 1980 in Damascus, Syria) is a Syrian playwright and dramaturg who lives in Berlin. His plays have been performed in the original Arabic versions or in translation in several countries, including the Middle East, the US, United Kingdom, France and Germany. His plays are part of Syrian literature in the context of war and imprisonment.

== Life and career ==
Al Attar studied English literature at the University of Damascus and theater studies at the Higher Institute for Dramatic Arts in the Syrian capital. He then earned a master's degree in applied drama at Goldsmiths University, London.

His plays have been staged in translation at theaters in various countries, including the Avignon Festival and the Festival d'Automne in Paris, the Volksbühne Berlin, the Lincoln Center New York, the Royal Court Theatre in London, and the Kunsten Festival in Brussels, as well as at the Teatr Powszechny in Warsaw, the Onassis Stegi Cultural Center in Athens and the House of World Cultures in Berlin.

In addition to plays, Al Attar has also written articles for magazines, with a particular interest in the revolution in Syria since 2011. Because of his focus on the fate of refugees and the war in his country, he has been described as “an important chronicler of war-torn Syria.”

Al Attar has lived in Berlin since 2015 and also is a fellow at the Berlin Institute for Advanced Study. For several years, Al Attar has been working with the Syrian director Omar Abusaada. Her theater is characterized by both fictional and documentary elements.

Al Attar's earliest play, Withdrawal, was performed in a cramped apartment in his hometown; his second, Could You Please Look into the Camera, followed a massive wave of arrests in his country. This text consists of testimonies from prisoners who were tortured in military prisons.

Between 2013 and 2017, Al Attar and Abusaada performed a trilogy about the fates of refugee Syrian women, which is based on classical Greek tragedies. His adaptation of Iphigenia after Euripides was shown in 2017 at the Volksbühne in Berlin, preceded by The Trojan Women after Euripides in Jordan and Antigone of Shatila after Sophocles in Lebanon.

In the 2023/24 theatre season, the German premiere of Al Attar's work Damascus 2045 took place in the Theater Freiburg. The piece, set in a utopian future, addresses “the mechanisms of forgetting, the writing of war history and the narratives of the victors and the vanquished.” In March 2024, his play A Chance Encounter premiered in the same German theatre. In the plot, which is based on a real event, Anas, one of the main characters, meets the other protagonist, Walid Salem, by chance in Berlin. In the ensuing court case, both men try to remember their encounter ten years ago during an interrogation by the Syrian secret service. The piece thus addresses “the different meanings of justice and the stories of the past [...] that cannot be buried without facing them.”

== Works ==
- Withdrawal (2007)
- Samah (2008)
- Online (2011)
- Could You Please Look Into The Camera? (2011)
- A Chance Encounter (2012)
- Antigone Of Shatila (2014)
- While I Was Waiting (2016)
- Iphigenia (2017)
- Aleppo. A Portrait Of Absence (2017)
- The Factory (2019)
- Damascus 2045 (2019)
- Yesterday's Encounter (2024)

== Reception ==
The reviews of the production with Syrian amateur actresses of his play Iphigenia at the Volksbühne Berlin acknowledged the emotional impact as an act of "organized sympathy," but were largely negative about the production, criticising the references to the Greek original plays as “out of place.“

A more positive review of the production of A Chance Encounter highlighted how the author “continues to turn the screw of complexity, away from deadly struggles and towards the realities of life. In doing so, he gets really close to the audience, makes the distance to distant torture chambers disappear and anchors them as part of our history.“

A detailed description of Al Attar's theatre was published by the writer Caspar Shaller in Die Zeit in 2017. He pointed out that the text for Iphigenia had been written in collaboration with eleven Syrian women, "not only to merge their stories with Euripides' text, to give them a voice, but also to achieve a cathartic effect for the women themselves." In this context, Shaller also referred to the Theatre of the Oppressed as known by the Brazilian dramatist Augusto Boal, as a method setting people free.
