= William Kidd (composer) =

American musician, conductor, composer and orchestrator

- Occupations: Musician; conductor; composer; orchestrator
- Years active: 1990s–present

William "Bill" Kidd is an American musician, conductor, composer, and orchestrator. He has worked on many television shows and feature films, including Passenger 57 (1992), Return to Lonesome Dove (1993), Lois & Clark: The New Adventures of Superman (1993–97), Left Behind (2000), and Muhammad: The Last Prophet (2002).

Kidd's work is also featured on the official soundtrack album of the theme park Universal Islands of Adventure, in Orlando, Florida.
