= Liwaa Yazji =

Syrian filmmaker and playwright

- لواء يازجي
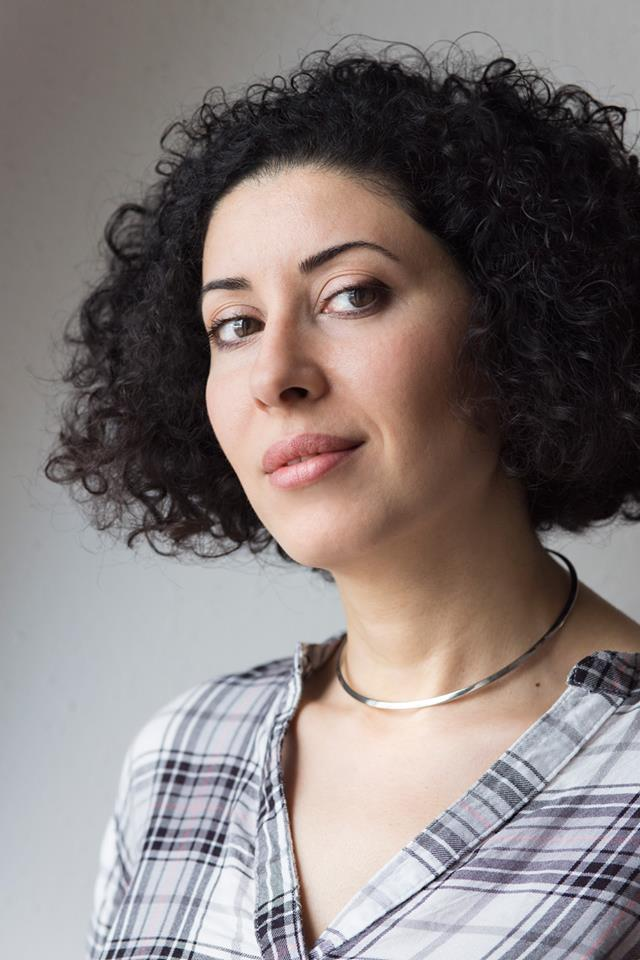
- Liwaa Yazji in 2016 by Florian Riemann
- Born: 1977 (age 48–49); Moscow, Soviet Union
- Occupations: filmmaker, playwright, poet
- Writing career
- Language: Arabic
- Notable works: Haunted, Goats

Liwaa Yazji, alternative spelling Liwaa Yazaji, (Arabic: لواء يازجي, born 1977 in Moscow, Soviet Union) is a Syrian filmmaker, playwright, TV screenwriter, dramaturge and poet. Her works, written in Arabic, have been translated into English and presented in the United Kingdom, the US and, in original Arabic versions, in Arab states.

== Early life and education ==
Yazji was born to Syrian parents Haidar Yazaji (1946–2014), an artist, and Salwa Abdullah, who is a gynecologist and served as Minister of Social Affairs and Labour in the Syrian government from 2020 to 2021. Liwaa Yazji spent her early childhood years in Moscow, where her parents were completing their academic studies. The family returned to Syria in the early 1980s and stayed in the city of Aleppo for some years, before they moved to Damascus, where she finished her elementary, preparatory and secondary schooling. She then studied English Literature at Damascus University (1995–1998), and did her postgraduate diploma in Literary Studies (1998–1999). From 1999 to 2003, she was enrolled in Theater Studies at the Higher Institute for Dramatic Arts in Damascus.

== Career ==
Starting in 2003, she worked as a dramaturge and assistant director in several theater projects in Damascus, and acting student supervisor dramaturge for their last year show up to 2006 . In 2007, she worked for the General Committee of the 2008 Arab Capital of Culture in Damascus, where she was in charge of programming Syrian theater and dance performances for the year's cultural program. After this, she was involved in creative writing projects for theater and TV, working as a scriptwriter for several pan-Arab production companies.

When the Syrian civil war broke out in 2011, she started to work on her first full-length documentary film Haunted, released in 2014. In 2016, she first moved to Beirut and then to Berlin. Since 2012, Yazji has also been a board member of the Syrian non-profit cultural organisation Ettijahat - Independent Culture.

Yazji's work is marked by her reflections about the cruelty of the war in Syria, her situation as a writer with family in Syria, who takes sides against this war, and by political and surrealist traditions of theater, such as that of Bertold Brecht and Edward Bond, whose play Saved she translated into Arabic in 2015.

If I decide to stop writing, then the enemy – or the dictatorship, shall we say – succeeds in making me shut up, whether I am inside or outside the country, [...] So it’s kind of dealing with your own censorship and fears.

— Liwaa Yazji,

== Works ==
Here in the Park

This was her first play, published in May 2012, although it was originally written between 2007 and 2009. It was published by Mamdouh Adwan Publishing House in Damascus.

In Peace, We Leave Home

A poetry collection published in 2014 in Beirut, Lebanon. The poems in this collection were written during a span of several years before being published. A translation of three poems from this collection was published in English by CEC ArtsLink and The Martin E. Segal Theater in New York in 2017 after the author had been artist-in-residence at the Poets House in New York.

The Brothers

A drama series of 100 episodes, written by Liwaa Yazji and Mohammad Abou Laban. Broadcast first in 2014 on Abu Dhabi TV channel and then distributed all over pan-Arab channels.

Haunted

A full-length documentary that Yazji wrote, produced and directed, released in 2014. It was supported by a fund from the Heinrich Boell Foundation. The film takes the viewer on a surreal journey through the lives of nine individuals who are either internally displaced in Syria or seeking refuge in Lebanon.

It won the Special Mention award at its premiere in the Marseille Festival of Documentary Film in 2014 and the Al Waha Bronze at the GIGAF festival in Tunisia 2016. The film also toured other international festivals and was released in selected cinemas.

Q & Q

A play on the debate of giving birth under conditions of violence, commissioned by the Royal Exchange Theatre in Manchester 2016. The play was first broadcast by BBC Radio and had a staged reading at the B!rth Festival in 2016. It was also part of the International Women Playwright Conference in Chile 2018, and the Edinburgh International Festival 2017, with staged readings in theaters, academies and health institutions.

Goats

A surrealist play about villagers receiving a goat from local mayor in compensation for their sons who died in the civil war. Translated into English in 2017 by Katharine Halls and after a first staged reading during the event "Told From the Inside" at the Royal Court Theatre, London, in 2016, it premiered in the same venue in December 2017. Goats was also part of PEN World Voices: International Play Festival 2018, New York, and a staged reading in Arabic was produced at the Khashabi Theatre in Haifa, in February 2019.

Waiting for the Guests

A short play first published in Index on Censorship magazine in 2018. It portrays a woman persecuted by the state because of her writings. Thus, she is left with the difficult choice to either be killed by soldiers or to kill herself and her family before the soldiers arrive.

Apples of my Grandmother

A monologue poem, a part of the Second-hand body, a project curated by the Dancing on the Edge Festival in Amsterdam 2019, where Yazji's poetic monologue " Apples of my grandmother" was first presented. The text then had a presentation in Maxim Gorki Theater in Berlin- in the PostHeimat Encounters #4.

Unknown Record

Qaid Majhol, in Arabic, a mini series of 8 episodes aired on OSN 2021 written by Liwaa Yazji and Mohammad Abou Laban. It is about Samir, a miserable man in every sense of the word, fights for the bite of his daily life, confronting his wife, daughter, co-workers, his manager and the entire community. His only friend, Yazan, is completely different from him: a young man who is elegant, cares about his appearance, brave to the point of insanity.

Songs for Days to Come

Musical and poetic project, co-written by Liwaa Yazji and Mohammad Abou Labn, featuring Syrian musicians Kinan Azmeh, Dima Orsho, and cellist Kinan Abou-Afach, as well as pianist Lenore Davis, and poets from Syria which Liwaa Yazji was one of them. Yazji's participation was called A Glimpse. The operatic play premiered in Morganland Festival 2022.

The Hero

A thirty Episodes TV series that was first broadcast 2025 on MBC Group- Shahid (streaming platform). Liwaa was the script Doctor and a co-writer for several episodes. It tackles the life of a Syrian village from 2016 until the fall of the regime in 2025.

== Collaborations ==
Windows of the soul - Story of Syria

A film directed by Allyth Hajjo and Ammar Alani. 2010/2011, Syria, with Yazji as assistant director.

September rain

A film directed by Syrian filmmaker Abdellatif Abdelhamid in 2009/2010. Yazji played the role of the beloved of one of the main protagonists in the film.

Kashash

Curated by Alma Salem in 2017, the Syrian Sixth Space curatorial platform gathered 22 Syrian cultural leaders, currently resident in 10 countries around the world: Canada, The United States of America, Germany, France, The U.K, Turkey, Lebanon, UAE, The Netherlands and Syria. These cultural leaders included artists, intellectuals, journalists, researchers, software technicians, and public speakers. Taking place in The Netherlands they publicly presented a multi-dimensional space inspired and informed by the Syrian Kashash (trans.: pigeon breeders) tradition. Yazji participated with a story titled "The birds of longing".

Reveal

An "active reality adventure", set in Kings's Lynn town, December 2018. Yazji participated with her lyrical poem Maya`s Story, set to music by British composer Sandy Nuttgens, with images by Joe Magee and performed by Becky Banatvala.

Kyklada Press

Liwaa Yazji has contributed to two publications in this series of publication. in Forced Movement book she wrote the entry titled In the Great Mara River, and in Urban Lament book she wrote the entry titled The Gate of tears.

== Winning Projects ==
Trash

This project received a Fellowship Grant for non-German-speaking authors in Berlin in 2018. The text is a literature piece intended later on to turn into a scenario of a feature film. It is about the relation between humans and their trash during war times.

Heim

Supported by the Doha Film Institute Grant for Series Development 2019 Yazji co-wrote the script of a TV series called Heim (German for home or shelter), which deals with the life of refugees in Tempelhof Heim in Berlin. The film was selected to be part of the Qumra Film Market in Doha 2020.

Hostage

A feature documentary in progress. Was part of Doc Station in Berlin International Film Festival 2021 Liwaa was the same year A Berlinale Talents as well. The film asks the question of why refugees dont go back!. The film was as well part of the Market at Doc Fest Munich 2021 and won the DAE membership award.
