= Boutheina Jabnoun Marai =

Tunisian journalist

- Citizenship: Tunisian
- Occupation(s): Journalist, magazine publisher, Writer
- Employer(s): editor-in-chief, Bouthaina magazine

Boutheina Jabnoun Marai (Tunisian Arabic: بثينة جبنون مرعي) is a Tunisian journalist and magazine publisher. She is the co-owner and the editor-in-chief of Bouthaina magazine. She currently resides in Abu Dhabi.
