= Trafalgar Group =

American opinion polling company

- Type: Private
- Industry: Opinion polling
- Founder: Robert Cahaly
- Headquarters: Atlanta, Georgia, US
- Area served: United States
- Website: thetrafalgargroup.org

The Trafalgar Group is an opinion polling and survey company founded by Robert Cahaly and based in Atlanta, Georgia. It first publicly released polls in 2016.

Notably, Trafalgar successfully predicted the result of the 2016 U.S. presidential election. Although they incorrectly predicted the result of the 2020 U.S. presidential election for Trump in several states, according to a FiveThirtyEight analysis, their state polling margins were some of the most accurate that cycle.

Trafalgar's polls for the 2022 midterms were inaccurate, predicting Republican wins or close races in multiple states where Republicans ended up losing by significant margins.

Trafalgar does not fully disclose its polling methodology, which has drawn criticism from conventional pollsters. FiveThirtyEight has found that Trafalgar typically overestimates Republican Party performance by two points.

== Methodology ==
Trafalgar Group conducts polls through six methods, including live calls, interactive voice response calls, texts, and online opt-in platforms, and two proprietary methods. It uses relatively short questionnaires of nine questions or less. Trafalgar usually utilizes a voter contact pool of about 75,000 potential respondents, and contacts individuals on the pool until they obtain a desired sample size. Trafalgar states that it researches its pool of voters to determine characteristics such as likelihood to vote. This differs from traditional polling methods, which typically do not have fixed contact pools. Trafalgar's sampling methods have resulted in consistent response rates of around 1.37-1.46% for recent Trafalgar Group polls. Trafalgar Group creates its samples intending to account for a "social desirability bias" effect, the hypothesized tendency of some voters to calibrate their responses to polls towards what they believe the survey taker would like to hear. The methods Trafalgar has used in its polling includes identifying low-engagement voters through data on lifestyle characteristics and asking respondents how they plan to vote, but also how they think their neighbors might vote.

Trafalgar says that it applies minimal weighting to its poll results. In presidential polling, Trafalgar Group only conducts state-level polls; according to Cahaly, "we don't do national polls, and that's for the same reason I don't keep up with hits in a baseball game: It's an irrelevant statistic".

According to The New York Times, there is almost no explanation of the Trafalgar Group's methodology: "the methods page on Trafalgar's website contains what reads like a vague advertisement of its services and explains that its polls actively confront social desirability bias, without giving specifics as to how." Responding to criticism of Trafalgar's polling methods and its lack of transparency about its methods, Cahaly said in November 2020, "I think we’ve developed something that’s very different from what other people do, and I really am not interested in telling people how we do it. Just judge us by whether we get it right."

== Performance and accuracy ==
Before the 2020 election, FiveThirtyEight gave Trafalgar a grade of C−.

Afterwards, until March 2023, FiveThirtyEight had Trafalgar at a grade of A−.

As of March 9, 2023, FiveThirtyEight has Trafalgar at a grade of B.

As of September 17, 2024, FiveThirtyEight has Trafalgar at a grade of 0.7/3.

Split Ticket does not include Trafalgar in its polling averages.

=== 2016 US presidential election ===
During the 2016 United States presidential election, Trafalgar Group was the only polling firm showing Donald Trump winning the state of Michigan, which he ultimately did, and – according to RealClearPolitics – "nearly the only" one correctly predicting Trump's win in Pennsylvania. According to the New York Times, Trafalgar correctly predicted the number of electoral votes each candidate would receive, but not which states would provide those votes.

=== 2018 US midterm elections ===
Trafalgar was an outlier in polling in the 2018 Georgia gubernatorial election, with its final poll showing Brian Kemp leading by 12 points, a race he ultimately won by less than two points; every other poll showed a one or two point difference in the race.

=== 2020 US presidential election ===
Before the 2020 United States presidential election, Trafalgar Group said that Trump would win the election, estimating that he would win Arizona, Florida, Georgia, Michigan, Nevada, North Carolina, and Pennsylvania. FiveThirtyEight ranked Trafalgar as the second-most accurate pollster of the 2020 election in terms of lowest error, with a statistical error of 2.6 points, in an election where pollsters generally had an average error of 6.3 points. It also noted that Trafalgar received less credit for its accurate polling due to missed "calls" of electoral winners in several close swing states.

=== 2021 Georgia Senate runoff elections ===
Leading up to the 2021 runoff elections Trafalgar Group showed both incumbents Kelly Loeffler and David Perdue initially ahead of Raphael Warnock and Jon Ossoff yet by December they were both trailing a few points behind. On January 5, 2021, the day before the 2 Georgia Senate runoff elections, Trafalgar predicted that Ossoff was leading by 0.9 points over Perdue and that incumbent Loeffler was leading 1.3 points over Raphael Warnock. Ossoff won by a margin of 1.2 and Loeffler lost by a margin of 2.1 percent.

=== 2021 gubernatorial elections ===
Aside from Fox News, Trafalgar had reported the most accurate poll in Virginia, predicting Glenn Youngkin would win by 2, which he did by 1.9.

In New Jersey, Trafalgar had Phil Murphy winning the election but gave him the smallest margin of the polls, with only 4%, while Murphy won by 2.8%

=== 2022 US midterm elections ===
Trafalgar's polling numbers were considerably off in the 2022 United States midterm elections. Trafalgar's polls incorrectly suggested that Republican candidates such as Mehmet Oz, Herschel Walker, Kari Lake, Tudor Dixon, Adam Laxalt, Blake Masters, Christine Drazan, and Tim Michels would all win. Their polls also suggested that Republican candidates such as Don Bolduc, Lee Zeldin, Mark Ronchetti, Doug Mastriano, Scott Jensen, Heidi Ganahl, Joe O'Dea, and Tiffany Smiley, were within striking distance, but some like Mastriano lost in landslides.

2026 US midterm elections

Trafalgar’s polling was highly inaccurate in the 2026 midterms. It failed to catch the so “Blue Wave” of Democratic wins coming and instead showed Republicans winning the Senate. Trafalgars final polls had Republicans winning the Senate races in South Carolina, Mississippi, Maine, Iowa, and Texas when all were won by the Democrats. Trafalgar also showed Michigan, Ohio, Minnesota, and Kansas were close races when some were outside the margin of error wins for the Democrats. Trafalgar had Republican Mike Collins within 8 points when the final result was Ossoff by almost 20 points in victory.

== See also ==
- Cahaly v. LaRosa
