= Princess of Rome =

2015 Iran, Lebanon film

- Promotional film poster for Princess of Rome
- Written by: Zahra Barti; Abbas Sharara; Hadi Mohammadian; Hamed Jafari
- Produced by: Hamed Jafari
- Edited by: Hassan Ayoubi
- Music by: Arya Aziminejad
- Production company: HonarPooya Group
- Distributed by: HonarPooya Group
- Release dates: February 1, 2015 (33rd Fajr International Film Festival); October 4, 2015 (Iran)
- Running time: 75 minutes
- Countries: Iran, Lebanon
- Languages: Persian and Arabic
- Budget: $600,000

Princess of Rome (Persian: شاهزاده روم) is an Iranian computer-animated movie produced by Hamed Jafari about the life of a Christian princess, Malika, mother-to-be of Muhammad al-Mahdi, the 12th Shia Imam and granddaughter of the Emperor of the Byzantine Empire, also known as the Eastern Roman Empire and historically referred to as Rome in Islamdom. The animation is 75 minutes in duration and narrates the story of Malika's journey to Samarra in Iraq to marry Hasan al-Askari, the 11th Shia Imam. She changes her name to Nargis Khatoon following the marriage.

The animation was screened in Iran at the 33rd Fajr International Film Festival for the first time. The animation was also dubbed in Arabic and released in Iraq, Kuwait, Lebanon and some other Middle Eastern countries. The animation was also released in France, Canada, Australia and others.

Princess of Rome features as many as 40 characters in the animation, and almost 100 specialists contributed to its production. Princess of Rome was created by HonarPooya Animation company.

Hamed Jafari was the producer and Hadi Muhammadian was director and Zahra Barti, Abbas Sharara, Hadi Mohammadian & Hamed Jafari were the member of Writing Team and Arya Aziminejad was Composer the movie. The film producer Jafari said that "students are the main target audience of the film". For this reason, religious and historical experts thought the animation to be displayed for children and teenagers. Jafari said "This film was produced with a budget of 600,000 dollars in 15 months, which is a record in the local animation industry." The quality of Roman Princess is far ahead of other animations in Iran and is comparable with foreign works.

== Cast ==
=== Persian language ===
- Nasser Tahmasb
- Manoochehr Valizade
- Hosein Erfani
- Maryam Shirazad
- Arshak GHakosian
- Javad Pezashkian
- Alireza Dibaj
- Maryam Radpor
- Mohamad Ali Dibaj
- Hossein Kamalabadi
- Nasim Rezakhani
- Maryam Banaiee
- Sharad Banki
- Alireza Ashkbos
- Mohamad Ali Janpanah

=== Arabic language ===
- Sohair Nasreddeen
- Ali Shokair
- Noureddeen Mirzadah
- Omar Mikati
- Ali Saad
- Bilal Bishtawi
- Saad Hamdan
- Rawda Kassem
- Sawssan Awwad
- Joumana Zonji
- Khaled El Sayed
- Omar Al-Shammaa
- Samir Kammoun
- Nisreen Masoud
- Rania Mroueh
- Hussni Badereddeen
- Asmahan Bitar
- Rana Al Rifai

== See also ==
- List of Islamic films
- List of animated Islamic films
- Muhammad al-Mahdi
- Muhammad: The Last Prophet
- Smart Kid
