= Bahman Hashemi =

Iranian film producer and actor (born 1962)

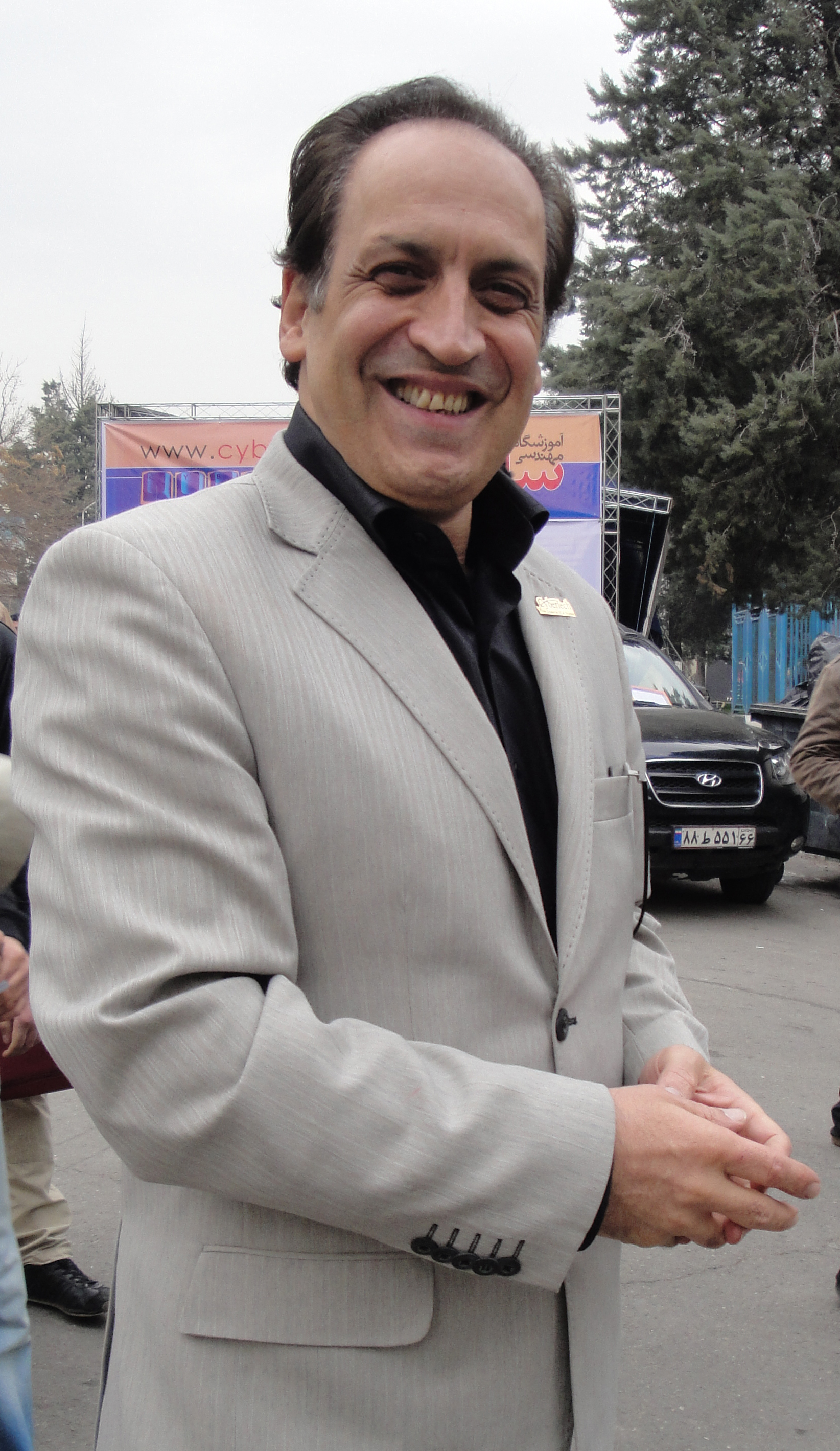
- Bahman Hashemi at Elcomp Exhibition 2011
- Born: July 24, 1962 (age 64); Tehran, Iran
- Occupations: Television presenter, actor
- Years active: 1992–present
- Children: Saba

Bahman Hashemi (Persian: بهمن هاشمی; Original Name: Akbar Mirzahashemi) is an Iranian TV presenter and actor born on July 24, 1962, in Tehran, Iran.

== Biography ==
Bahman Hashemi first started his career as a presenter on television in 1992. After that, he continued his work in the dubbing department of movies and radio. Due to his voice and expression in dubbing, he became one of those who used their voices and art of dubbing for most trailers of movies and series in Iran, such as the trailer of Alarm für Cobra 11 series. He is currently in charge of the Monday and Wednesday live show Get on the line of IRIB TV5. He has a daughter named Saba.

== Selected filmography ==
- 2003: Brighter than off (TV series)
- 2005: Tickle
- 2007: Zero Degree Turn (TV series)
- 2013: Capital (TV series)
- 2017: The Elephant King

=== TV performance ===
- Iranian Variety show
- Get on the line

=== Dubbing ===
- Road to Avonlea as Supporting and guest roles
- Taaqatwar as Anil Dhawan
- Serenity as Djimon Hounsou
