= Smart Kid =

- Written by: Ali Ramadan
- Produced by: Hamed Jafari
- Edited by: Hassan Ayoubi
- Music by: Amir Tavassoli
- Production company: HonarPooya Group
- Distributed by: HonarPooya Group
- Release date: 2023
- Running time: 83 minutes
- Country: Iran
- Language: Persian

Smart Kid (Persian: بچه زرنگ), produced by the Honar Pouya Group, is a 2023 Iranian animated adventure film produced in 2023, directed by Behnood Nekoei, Hadi Mohammadian, and Mohammad Javad Jannati, written by Ali Ramadan, and produced by Hamed Jafari. Hooman Haji Abdollahi, Javad Pezzeshkian, Hedayat Hashemi, and Mir-Taher Mazloomi, under the direction of Saeed Sheikhzadeh, form the voice cast of the film. Smart Kid narrates the adventures of a boy named Mohsen who wants to help others like superheroes, until the appearance of a tiger brings him closer to his lifelong dream of becoming a superhero. This is the third animated film by the Honar Pouya Group after Prince of Rome (2014) and The Elephant King (2017).

Smart Kid was a joint production of the Honar Pouya Group and Institute for the Intellectual Development of Children and Young Adults, and was made by the Honar Pouya Group with the participation of nearly 250 Iranian youth between 2018 and 2022. It was first shown on February 12, 2023, at the 41st Fajr International Film Festival, and Hamed Jafari received the Crystal Simorgh for Best Animated Film. Its public release began on October 25, 2024, and the film grossed 62.5 billion tomans in Iranian cinema theaters and nearly 7 billion tomans in cities without cinemas.

The film was the highest-grossing Iranian animated film of all time, and the third most-viewed film in the country in 2024.

The film is also known as Extinction and Talking Tiger.

== Cast ==
- Hooman Haji Abdollahi
- Javad Pezzeshkian
- Hedayat Hashemi
- Mir-Taher Mazloomi
- Georges Petrousi
- Mina Ghiyaspour
- Maryam Radpour
- Touraj Nasr
- Ardeshir Monazam
- Mahsa Erfani
- Ebrahim Shafiei
- Nazanin Yari
- Alireza Dibaj
- Metanat Esmaeili
- Poya Fahimi
