= Nanda Mohammad =

Syrian actress and playwright, born 1980

- Born: Damascus, Syria
- Occupation: Actress
- Years active: 2005 – present
- Known for: acting in Arab TV series
- Notable work: co-author of Hawa al-Hurriya (Whims of Freedom), (theatre production)
- Spouse: Mohamed Sami
- Awards: Knight of the French Order of Arts and Letters

Nanda Mohammad (Arabic: ناندا محمد) is a Syrian actress and playwright. She is known for her work in both theatre and television in Europe and in the Arab world.

== Life and career ==
Mohammad was born and grew up in Syria. In 2001, she graduated from the Higher Institute of Dramatic Arts in Damascus. She is married to the Egyptian violinist Mohamed Sami. Since 2012, she has often been working with Egyptian theatre director Ahmed al-Attar.

In Syria, she has continued her work in contemporary theatre, for example in productions with Naila al-Atrash and Omar Abou Saada, and has appeared on Syrian television. Since 2004, she has coached and trained other artists in voice and acting in the Middle East and in Europe.

Internationally and in the Arab world, Mohammad has worked with theatre directors such as Tim Supple (UK), Ariane Mnouchkine (France), Nullo Facchini (Denmark), Omar Abou Saada (Syria), Pascal Rambert (France), Khaled Al-Tarefi (Palestine), Catherine Schaub Abkarian (France), Laila Soliman (Egypt), Henri Jules Julien (France) and Daniel San Pedro (France), among others. She participated in productions presented at theatre festivals such as the Festival d'Avignon, the London International Festival of Theatre (LIFT), the World Theatre Festival in Shizuoka, Japan, the Zurich Theater Spektakel and the Theatre de Vidy in Switzerland, Kunstenfestivaldearts, Belgium, Hong Kong Arts Festival and the Singapore International Festival of Arts.

As playwright, she has co-authored the plays Hawa al-Hurriya (Whims of Freedom) and Gathering Memories with My Eyelashes, written during her residency at La Cité Internationale des Arts in Paris. In 2024, she was part of the jury for performance-related grants by the Arab Fund for Arts and Culture (AFAC), Beirut.

As Mohammad became known for her support of the Syrian revolution, she was banned in her home country after her last visit in 2012.

=== Selected performances ===
==== Theatre ====
- 2011 One Thousand and One Nights by Hanan al-Shaykh, Luminato Festival, Toronto, Canada.
- 2014, Hawa al-Hurriya, commissioned by the London International Festival of Theatre (LIFT), performances at Cairo, Berlin, Freiburg, Brussels
- 2019, Before the Revolution by Ahmed al-Attar, Edinburgh Festival.
- 2024, Every Brilliant Thing adapted by Ahmed al-Attar, based on the original play by Duncan Macmillan, Arts Center, Abu Dhabi

==== Television ====
- 2005, Holding Back Tears, Syrian TV series
- 2015, Dead Right, Egyptian TV series

== Awards ==
- Knight of the Order of Arts and Letters by the French Ministry of Culture, 2022
