= God's Faithful Servant: Barla =

2011 Turkish animation-biographical film

- Film poster
- Directed by: Esin Orhan
- Release date: 4 November 2011
- Country: Turkey
- Language: Turkish

God's Faithful Servant: Barla (Turkish: Allah'ın Sadık Kulu: Barla) is a 2011 Turkish animated biopic, directed by Esin Orhan. The film received a nationwide general release on November 4, 2011.

== Plot ==
The film is about the life of Muslim scholar Said Nursî (1870–1960). It is about Nursi's time in the village of Barla, Isparta Province in which he wrote part of the Risale-i Nur. His life is told through the perspective of a fictional boy named Mustafa. The time period is from 1927 to 1934. It shows what happened when Nursi decided to teach religion.

== Production ==
Motion capturing was used to animate the film. The actors' movements were digitized by having a device connected to the actors' bodies while moving. A group of people that was part of Samanyolu TV helped produce the film. It is Turkey's first animated film that is both a full-length feature and 3D animated with motion capture.

The director's intention was for the film to affect children. She believed that the story would be easier to portray through animation rather than through live action. It is Orhan's first film.

== Theatrical release ==
The film's musical score was composed by Cengiz Onural and Bora Ebeoğlu. The score that Onural and Ebeoğlu composed was played by the Budapest Symphony Orchestra. It took over 3 years to complete the production. The release was successful with it becoming the fourth highest-grossing film within Turkey for 2011. God's Faithful Servant: Barla was released on 303 theater screens within Turkey. Visitors to one of the showings included Turkish politicians, artists, and prior students of Nursi.

== See also ==
- List of Islamic films
- List of animated Islamic films
