= Saladin: The Animated Series =

- Saladin title poster
- Genre: History, Fiction, Drama, Adventure, Comedy
- Countries of origin: Malaysia; Qatar
- Original languages: Arabic; Malay; English
- No. of seasons: 2
- No. of episodes: 26

Production
- Executive producer: Mahmoud Orfali, Kamil Othman
- Running time: 26 minutes

Original release
- Network: Al Jazeera Children's Channel; Jeem TV

Related
- Saladin the Great (Salah Al-Din Yusuf Ibni Ayub)

Saladin (Arabic: صلاح الدين Ṣalāḥ ad-Dīn) is an animated project inspired by the life Salah Al-Din Yusuf Ibni Ayub, the Islamic hero who united Muslims in the holy war against the Crusaders in the 12th century. The series was co-produced by the Multimedia Development Corporation in Malaysia and the Al Jazeera Children's Channel in Qatar as a 26-part animated TV series. Production started in May 2004 and a six-minute trailer was previewed during the Multimedia Super Corridor’s 10th Anniversary celebration in April 2005. The first episode aired in late 2009.

== Characters ==
Main Characters

- Saladin (صلاح الدين) (voiced by Fadi Rifai): The main protagonist of the series whose goal is to protect Damascus from the Franks. He is very determined and selfless, he is also skilled with the sword.
- Tarik (طارق) (voiced by Wissam Sabbagh): He is Saladin's intellectual childhood friend. He uses the bow and arrow to help protect Damascus.
- Duncan (دانكن) (voiced by Bayan Abou Chacra): He is the tough, deserted Frank soldier who becomes a close friend to Saladin and Tarik. He uses the axe as his chosen weapon.
- Anisa (أنيسة) (voiced by Eman Bitar): She is a cunning thief who allies with Saladin many times. She is the love interest of Saladin. Her main weapon is a pair of daggers.

Antagonists

- Reginald (ريجنالد) (voiced by Ali Saad): He is the general that leads the Frank army. He is the main villain, as he is trying to take over Damascus.
- Behram (بهرام) (voiced by Khaled El Sayed): He is the leader of the Marauders, he is one of the many villains that Saladin and his friends fight against.

Supporting Characters

- Alexandra (أليكساندرا) (voiced by Suhair Naser Al Din): She is the noble and kind French princess. She is sometimes referred to as "Alex" by Duncan, who is her close friend and love interest.

== See also ==
- List of Islamic films
- List of animated Islamic films
