= Bachar Zarkan =

Syrian musician, singer, and actor

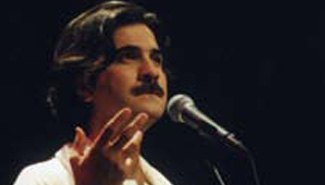
Bachar-zarkan.jpg

Bachar Zarkan (بشار زرقان: Arabic ) is a Syrian musician, singer, and actor known for his Sufi music.

== Early life ==
Zarkan spent much of his childhood in the quarter of Bab al-Salam in Damascus. When a teenager, he learned to play the ‘ud. His quest for creation enriched itself through his stay in France (1992-1997), his visits to several European countries and to the USA.

== Theatre ==
Zarkan's theatrical experience started, in 1986, in the parts he played as both an actor and a singer.

== Music for poetry ==
When he studied the Sound Theater at the Pygmalion Studio in France (1996), his aim was to deepen his understanding of the relationship between words, music, movement and rhythm. Now, he is interested in composing music for contemporary poetic texts that match the Sufi texts.

== Festival appearances ==
Bachar Zarkan participated in international and Arabic festivals:

- Festival The Spring of Culture, Bahrein, 2009
- Literature Festival of Berlin, September 2009

== Albums ==
- Tayer La Tatyr
- Haly Ant(Moi c'est Toi)
- AL-Jidarih
- Personne (la ahad )
