= Canadian Centre for Epigraphic Documents =

Canadian non-profit organization

The Canadian Centre for Epigraphic Documents (CCED) was a non-profit organization founded in order to archive, catalogue, and digitize epigraphic materials. The CCED was staffed by professionals and graduate student volunteers from the information field: librarians, archivists, and digital humanists.

Initially housed at the Department of Classics, University of Toronto Faculty of Arts and Science, the CCED worked with one of the largest collections of ancient Greek inscriptions in North America. These inscriptions were preserved in form of epigraphic squeezes and dated from the 7th century BC to the 4th century AD.

The CCED moved to at the Department of Near and Middle Eastern Civilizations, Faculty of Arts and Science. The CCED worked with the Harrak Collection of Iraqi Syriac and Garshuni inscriptions, the largest corpus of its type in the world. These inscriptions were preserved in analog and digital photograph format and date from the 7th to the 20th century AD.

The centre also worked with the St. Ephrem Ecumenical Research Institute (SEERI) Collection and the Association for the Preservation of the Saint Thomas Christian Heritage (APSTCH) Collection. These two collections, from Kerala, India, contain Syriac, Malayalam, Tamil and Pahlavi inscriptions dating from the 9th/10th century to the 20th century.

The centre issued a Call for Papers in the bid to establish a scholarly journal. The CCED Journal was set to be an open-access, peer-reviewed publication relating to epigraphic studies. Epigraphic studies was listed to include: historical or philological aspects of inscriptions; art historical aspects of inscriptions and their surrounding decorative motifs; digital humanities or information/library studies approaches relating to inscriptions; numismatics and sigillography.
