= Cahaly v. LaRosa =

Court case concerning robocalls in South Carolina

- No. 14-1651, 14-1680
- Court: United States Court of Appeals for the Fourth Circuit
- Full case name: Robert C. Cahaly, Plaintiff - Appellee, v. Paul C. LaRosa; Reginald I. Lloyd; South Carolina Law Enforcement Division, Defendants - Appellants.
- Decided: August 6, 2015
- Citations: Reed v. Town of Gilbert, 135 S. Ct. 2218 (2015)

Case history
- Prior actions: Judgment for plaintiff sub. nom. Cahaly v. LaRosa, 25 F. Supp. 3d 817, 827 (D.S.C. 2014)

Holding
- The law was found unconstitutional under the First Amendment, since robocalls with certain messages were singled out for prohibition while robocalls with other messages were allowed (e.g., genuine opinion surveys, calls with ideological, but not “political” messages, calls with religious messages, and so on). Judgment for the plaintiffs affirmed in part, vacated in part, and remanded with instructions 3–0, with Diaz, A. writing for the majority; Wynn, J.A. and Thacker, S. concurring.

Court membership
- Judges sitting: James A. Wynn, Jr., Albert Diaz, and Stephanie Thacker, U.S. Circuit Judges

Cahaly v. LaRosa is a lawsuit filed in federal court in 2013 that challenged South Carolina's law prohibiting most types of unsolicited consumer and political calls made by Automatic Dialing and Announcing Devices (ADAD), also known as "robocalls". The plaintiff won in U.S. district court in June 2014, and the Fourth Circuit Court of Appeals upheld that ruling in part, while vacating part in August 2015.

== Background ==
On November 3, 2010, campaign consultant Robert Cahaly was arrested by the State Law Enforcement Division (SLED), being charged for making illegal robocalls to six state house districts. The automated opinion polling system asked whether U.S. Speaker Nancy Pelosi should be invited to campaign with six Democratic candidates for the South Carolina Legislature. Cahaly was arrested despite having a written opinion from the state attorney general stating that he had acted within the law. The charges were subsequently dismissed in October 2012. After the charges were dropped, Cahaly filed a suit against state officials (including SLED Chief Reginald Lloyd), claiming his constitutional right to free speech had been violated. U.S. district court judge, Michelle Childs ruled that the anti-robocall statute was a content-based restriction on speech and therefore unconstitutional.

== Appeal ==
The South Carolina Law Enforcement Division filed an appeal with the Fourth Circuit Court of Appeals in response to the U.S. district court ruling. The case was argued on March 25, 2015, before Judges James A. Wynn, Jr., Albert Diaz, and Stephanie Thacker. Robert Cahaly was represented by Samuel Darryl Harms, III, and the South Carolina Law Enforcement Division was represented by Kenneth Paul Woodington. A decision was issued on August 6, 2015.

== Opinion of the court ==
Judge Albert Diaz wrote the opinion striking down South Carolina's robocall prohibitions, with unanimous concurrence.

As a content-based regulation of speech, the anti-robocall statute is subject to strict scrutiny. Under this standard, the government must prove that the restriction furthers a compelling interest and is narrowly tailored to achieve that interest. If a less restrictive alternative would serve the [g]overnment's purpose, the legislature must use that alternative. Moreover, the restriction cannot be overinclusive by unnecessarily circumscrib[ing] protected expression, or underinclusive by leav[ing] appreciable damage to [the government’s] interest unprohibited. (internal quotes and references omitted)

Acknowledgment was made by the court that restrictions on robocalls in Minnesota, § California, and federal law had been upheld by several other courts; notwithstanding, the statutes in those cases, as noted by the court, do not single out political or commercial robocalls, but prohibited all types of robocalls (with limited exceptions). The court also ruled that Cahaly lacked standing in order to challenge a provision of disclosure when making an automated call as compelled speech.

== Potential effects on future campaign activity ==
In reaction to the U.S. Court of Appeals ruling, several media outlets speculated that political campaigns, especially presidential, would lean much more heavily on the use of automated phone calls in order to reach voters and to push certain messages. This might include negative campaigning and so called "push" polls. A profound effect was expected and seen upon tactics used during South Carolina's "First in the South" primary in 2016 and in subsequent elections.
