= Elias Merkes =

Syrian footballer and coach (born 1987)

Ilyas Merkes
Personal information
- Date of birth: January 8, 1987 (age 39)
- Place of birth: Al-Hasakah, Syria
- Height: 1.83 m (6 ft 0 in)
- Position: Defender

Team information
- Current team: Assyriska FF (assistant)

Youth career
- Assyriska Föreningen

Senior career*
Years	Team	Apps	(Gls)
2004–2010	Assyriska Föreningen	51	(0)
2009	→ Enköpings SK (Loan)	21	(3)
2010	→ Assyriska BK (Loan)	8	(1)
2010–2011	Al-Jazeera Hasakah	9	(0)
2011–2012	Kaveh Tehran F.C.	26	(1)
2012	Syrianska IF Kerburan	8	(0)
2013	Betnahrin Suryoye IK	11	(0)
2014–2015	Södertälje FK	38	(0)
2016–2017	Arameiska-Syrianska IF	25	(0)
2017	Enskede IK	11	(0)

International career
2008–2010	Syria	4	(0)

Managerial career
- 2018–: Assyriska FF (assistant)
- * Club domestic league appearances and goals

Ilyas Merkes (born January 8, 1987, in Al-Hasakah) is a retired Syrian footballer and currently coach. He is currently the assistant manager of Assyriska FF.
