= Marwan Farhat =

Syrian television actor and voice actor

- مروان فرحات
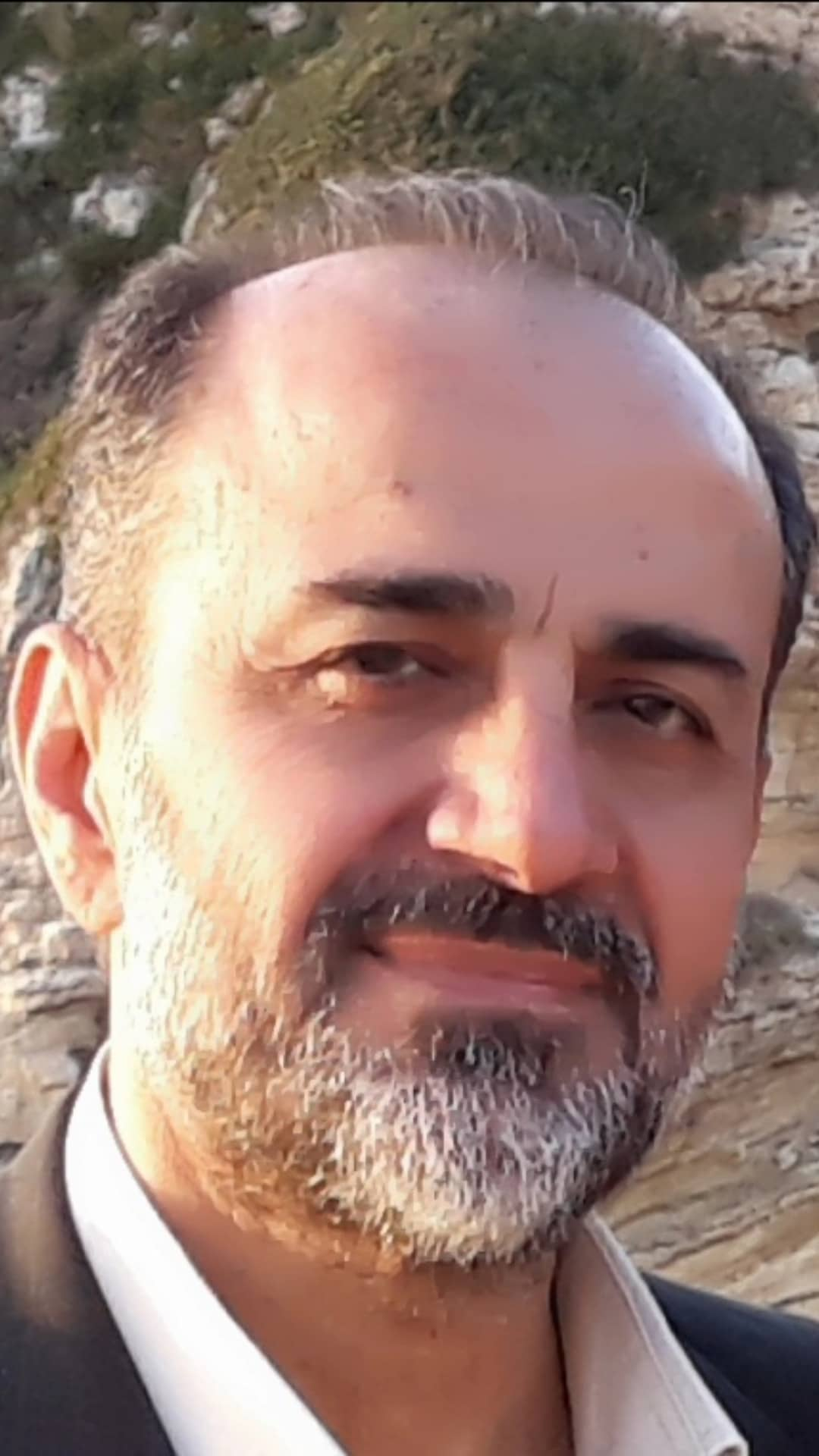
- Born: March 21, 1957 (age 69); Damascus, Syria
- Occupation: Actor
- Years active: 1981–present

Marwan Farhat (Arabic: مروان فرحات; born 21 March 1957) is a Syrian television actor and voice actor.

== Early life ==
Marwan Farhat was born in Damascus, Syria. After finishing secondary school, he attended the Higher Institute for Dramatic Arts in Damascus.

He began his acting career in 1981. He has worked as a voice actor and also as a film and television actor.

== Dubbing Roles ==
- Batman in Batman: The Animated Series
- Kogoro Mori and Dr. Agasa in Detective Conan
- Baron Alwyn in Robin Hood no Daibōken
- Tsubasa Oozora (adult) in Captain Tsubasa
