= Robert Cahaly =

21st-century American pollster and political consultant

- Born: Robert C. Cahaly; October 16, 1969 (age 56); Georgia, U.S.
- Education: University of South Carolina (BA)
- Occupations: Pollster; political consultant
- Organization: Trafalgar Group
- Known for: Weighting opinion polls to account for a purported "shyness" among Donald Trump supporters
- Political party: Republican

Robert C. Cahaly (born October 16, 1969) is an American pollster who founded of the Trafalgar Group. He was a political consultant for Republican Party candidates.

Cahaly founded Trafalgar Group in 2016. He drew attention in the aftermath of the election because Trafalgar had was one of a small number of polling firms to predict Donald Trump's victory over Hillary Clinton in the 2016 presidential election. Cahaly stated that Trafalgar's polling methodology was more accurate than other polls because it utilized methods to increase the weighting of "shy, pro-Trump" voters, which he argued were underrepresented in most polls. Cahaly does not disclose Trafalgar's group's methods of polling or its process for ascertaining the volume of shy Trump voters in the electorate.

Leading up to the 2020 presidential election, Cahaly garnered substantial media attention for his assertions that Trump would prevail over Joe Biden in the 2020 election, a claim that contradicted the polling consensus. Cahaly's prediction of a Trump victory proved to be wrong, with him (and Trafalgar) incorrectly predicting Trump victories in five battleground states won by Biden.

== Early life ==
Cahaly was born in Georgia and grew up in Pendleton, South Carolina, and received a Bachelor of Arts degree in political science from the University of South Carolina in 1995. Cahaly is of Syrian heritage and an Eastern Orthodox Christian. Starting as a child, he volunteered on various political campaigns, before eventually founding his own political consulting firm in 1997.

== Career ==
=== Political consultant ===
Cahaly has worked on campaigns for various Republicans, including governors Carroll Campbell, David Beasley, Mike Huckabee, Nikki Haley, Chris Christie, and Henry McMaster; US Senators Strom Thurmond, Bob Dole, Tim Scott, and Ben Sasse; and Presidents George H. W. Bush, George W. Bush, and Donald Trump.

On November 3, 2010, Cahaly was arrested by the State Law Enforcement Division (SLED) and charged with making illegal robocalls. Cahaly denied any wrongdoing, stating "It is sad and disappointing that in this charged election cycle full of last minute surprise attacks that Democrat Incumbents and power brokers are leveraging all of their influence to create a last minute salacious headline. We are apparently today's target." The charges were dismissed in October 2012. After the charges were dropped, Cahaly filed suit against SLED officials, claiming his constitutional right to free speech had been violated. The subsequent decision of Cahaly v. LaRosa found the anti-robocall statute was a content-based restriction on speech and therefore unconstitutional.

=== Pollster ===
Cahaly gained media attention in 2016 for being one of the few pollsters to accurately predict that Donald Trump would carry the states of Michigan and Pennsylvania in the 2016 United States presidential election. Cahaly attributed this partially on the "Shy Trump Voter Theory" that poll respondents are afraid to reveal that they are voting for Trump due to a "social desirability bias."

In November 2020, Cahaly appeared on Hannity on Fox News and predicted that Trump would win Pennsylvania, but possibly still lose the state through voter fraud: "He better win by 4 or 5% to make sure he gets victory there. That is the margin he needs to avoid what they will systematically do."

In September 2022, Cahaly, in an interview with Split Ticket, acknowledged methodological changes from his polling of the 2020 United States elections.

The Trafalgar Group's polling numbers were mostly inaccurate in the 2022 United States midterm elections. Trafalgar's polls incorrectly suggested that Republican candidates such as Kari Lake, Mehmet Oz, Tim Michels, and Herschel Walker, would all win.
