= Nejmi Succari =

Syrian violinist from Aleppo (born 1939)

Nejmi Succari (born 20 October 1939) is a Syrian violinist from Aleppo. He was a finalist in the 1967 Leventritt Competition. He studied with Russian violinist Mikhail Boricenco, a former student of Leopold Auer who had left Moscow for Syria in the 1920s.

== Early life ==
At age 12, in 1951, he came to Paris to study at the Conservatoire National de Musique, with Roland Charmy and Miguel Candela. In 1959, he enrolled in the class of Boris Bielynky at the Tchaikovsky Conservatory in Moscow.

== Career ==
Succari was a finalist in the 26th international Leventritt Competition of 1967, and was a winner in the Queen Elisabeth of Belgium Competition (1963) and the Jacques Thibaud Competition (Paris 1965). He made his first United States tours during the spring of 1973 and 1974.

He was distinguished in several concerts and recitals, in Baalbek festival (Lebanon) and Damascus 1967 accompanied by Leipzig symphonic orchestra where he performed Brahms' concerto for violin, Montreux festival 1967, France and Brazil. In 1971, in festival Lausanne he played Bach and Paganini for solo violin, and recorded for radio Geneve the Mendelsohn violin concerto with orchestra Suisse Romande directed by S. Bodbovy, and Bulgary. Gazette of Lausanne praised him:"Succari can rival the greatest violinists of today... He plays with superior temperament, a lively intelligence and a natural expression". British lady dedicated a Petrus Guarnierius violin which Joseph Szigeti had played upon before his retirement to him in appreciation of his talent in 1971 (Lausanne).

His appearances in the USA included three tours during 1973, and 1974, as a soloist in concerts and recitals. He was the guest for Bloomington Normal Symphony Orchestra, Oregon Symphony Orchestra, and Missoula Symphony Orchestra. Elsewhere he performed Paganini No1, Brahms, Mendelsohn, Beethoven and Tchaikovsky concertos for violin with the contribution of conductors Bernard Goodman, Eugene Andrie, George Barati, Laurence Smith and Edward C.Tritt. Albert Muller, a violin maker from California was pleased to give him a violin and a bow of his own handmade production.

He received the E.Ysaye medal for his performance in the memorial of the violinist and composer. With the contribution of Pasdeloup orchestra, conducted by Gerard Devos, he performed at the Champs Elisée theater Brahms violin concerto in 1978; Pierre Petit ranked him in a Le Figaro revue among the greatest virtuosos.
