= Bouthayna Shaya =

Syrian actress and voice actress

- بثينة شيا
- Born: Sweida, Syria
- Occupations: Actress, voice actress
- Years active: 1989–present

Bouthayna Shaya (Arabic: بثينة شيا) is a Syrian television actress and voice actress.

== Early life ==
She was born in Sweida area in Syria. She graduated from the Higher Institute of Dramatic Arts (Damascus) in 1989 and has a chorus Directed by theater.

== Filmography ==
=== Television ===
- Spider Web
- Justice Tower
- The mother

=== Radio ===
- Amazing phenomena
- The rule of justice
- Novelist figures
- The story in a representative

=== Plays ===
- Sunbath day
- Voices of the Depths
- Waiting for Godot

=== Dubbing roles ===
- Animaniacs - Slappy Squirrel
- The Looney Tunes Show - Patricia Bunny (Syrian dub)
- Spacetoon Interactive
- Pokemon (anime) - Ash Ketchum
- Romeo no Aoi Sora - Alfredo
- Bakuso Kyodai Let's & Go!! - Retsu
- Ginga Sengoku Gun'yūden Rai - Rogina
- Tico and Friends
