= Chefette =

Fast food chain in Barbados

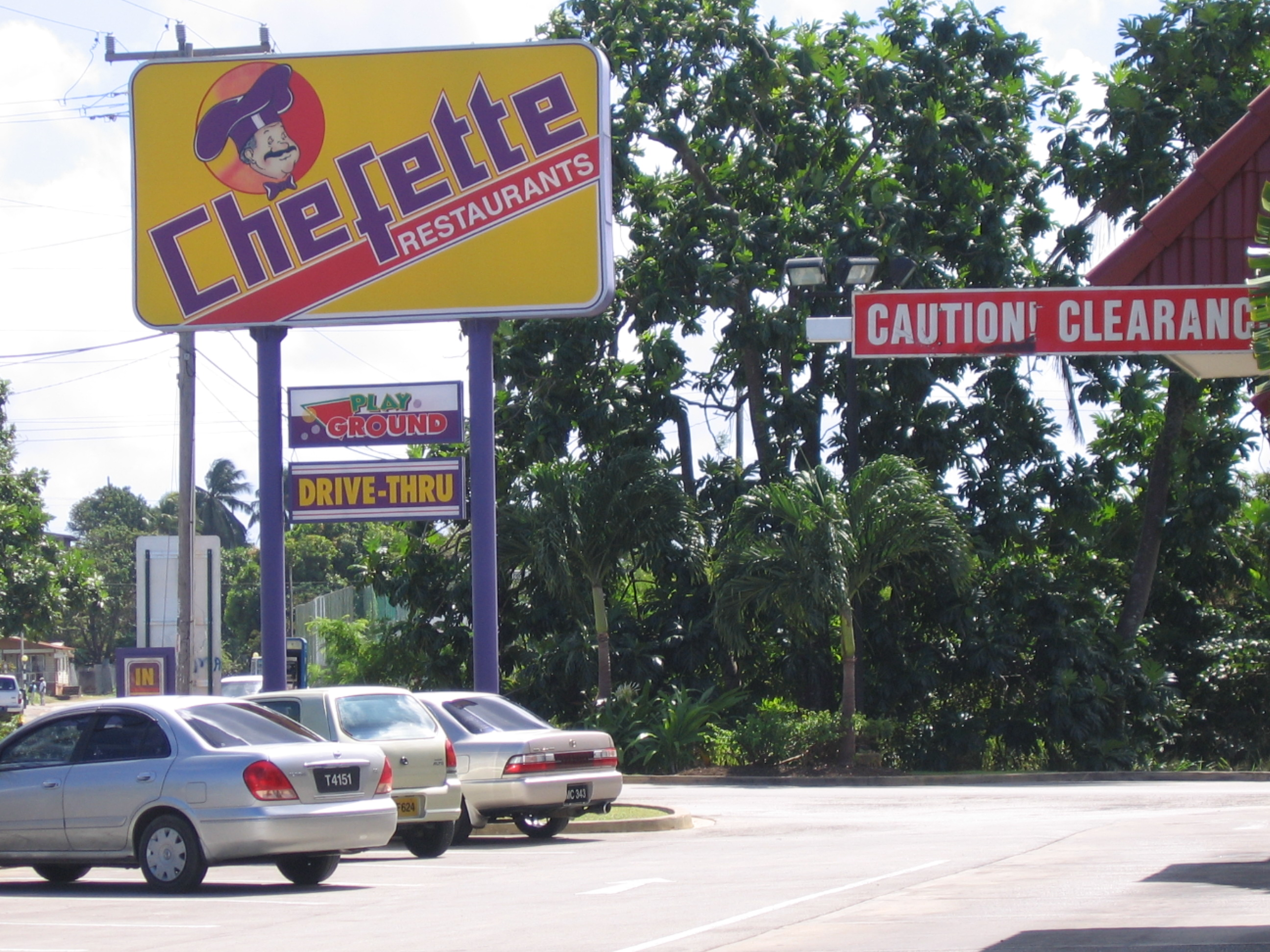
- Chefette drive-through in Speightstown, Barbados
- Industry: fast food restaurant
- Founded: 1972; 54 years ago
- Founder: Assad John Haloute

Chefette Restaurants is the largest fast food restaurant chain based in the Caribbean island nation of Barbados. Currently operating throughout the island in 15 locations, Chefette is known for its broasted chicken meals as well as a local curried-'meat + vegetable' (similar to the European gyro) roll-up or wrap, locally known as a roti. Chefette was founded by a Trinidadian businessman named Assad John Haloute, as well as members of the Naime and Nadur families who migrated to Barbados in the 1970s. In 1972 the trio opened the first Chefette Restaurant at Fontabelle, St. Michael. As the success of the chain grew over the next three decades, the restaurant chain continued its expansion. The company's trademark colours are yellow and purple.

Several of the outlets push the theme of being a "family restaurant" by constructing play areas for children similar to other major international chains such as McDonald's.

Though international restaurant chains (including McDonald's) generally lack an overall presence in Barbados, among Chefette's competitors is U.S.-based KFC. In 2010 Barbadian Senator Kerrie Symmonds lauded the Chefette establishment and urged other businesses in Barbados to emulate it when considering international expansion. Chefette's largest competitors are KFC, Burger King and Chicken Barn.

Although relatively unknown outside Barbados, the chain was recognised in May 2012 as one of the Top Fast Food chains by New York City-based Travel + Leisure magazine. They also were involved in a pop-up event in June 2023 in Manhattan, New York City, and Boston, Massachusetts, sharing some items on their menu with people living in the United States.

Chefette often collaborates with BBQ Barn, a more formal restaurant chain owned by Chefette.

Chefette sponsors the annual Chefette Fun Run in Barbados. Its proceeds go to homes for disabled children. Chefette also supports children who take the Common Entrance Exam.

== See also ==
- List of fast-food chicken restaurants
