= Osama Al-Samman =

Syrian civil society activist

- أسامة السمان
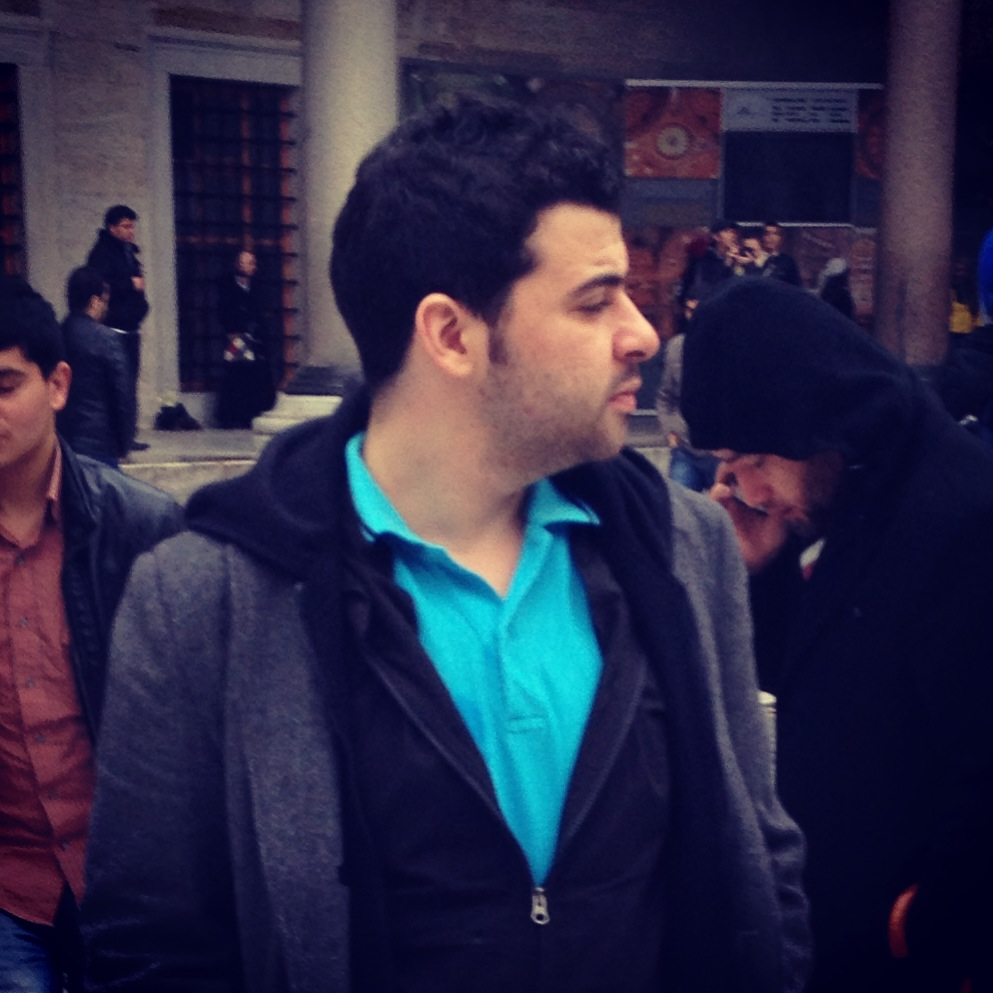
- Born: 26 March 1986; Damascus, Syria
- Occupations: Communication & Electrical Engineer, Internet activism
- Years active: 2008–2016

Osama Al-Samman (born 26 March 1986 in Syria) is a Syrian civil society activist. He moved to Egypt to pursue higher education, during which time the Tunisian revolution started.

The first role that he took on as a revolutionary was that of a media activist. Gradually, however, he transitioned to the political realm.

== Contributions to the Syrian uprising ==
Al-Samman’s revolutionary activities commenced after the Syrian Day of Rage, February 5, 2011, when he began producing protest videos. He also worked as a media spokesperson for the city of Al-Tall.

He was involved in various media campaigns that sought to shed light on the plight of Syrian prisoners of consciousness. The most prominent campaign he participated in was that for blogger RazanGhazzawi, which received the 2012 BOBs Award for the Best Social Activism Campaign.

When Suheir Attasi, a member of SRGU, was appointed to the Syrian National Coalition the Syrian National Coalition, SRGU subsequently appointed Al-Samman to manage her presidential office. He was among the eighteen individuals who represented the Syrian opposition at the 2013 Arab League summit.

== Conferences ==
- Antakya Conference " first Conference of the Syria revolution"
- Syrian National Salvation Conference
- 1st Cairo Conference
- 1st and 2nd Syrian Democratic Platform Conferences
- Syrian Writers Association
- 2nd and 3rd Friends of Syria Conferences
- Arab League Summit (where he acted as a representative of the Syrian opposition)
