= Tal Eltiten =

Tal Eltiten تل التتن
- Village
- Location in Syria
- Coordinates: 35.354432°N 36.347945°E
- Country: Syria
- Governorate: Hama
- District: Al-Suqaylabiyah District
- Subdistrict: Al-Suqaylabiyah Nahiyah

Population (2004)
  - Total: 435
- Time zone: UTC+3 (AST)
- City Qrya Pcode: C3119

Tal Eltiten (Arabic: تل التتن) is a Syrian village located in Al-Suqaylabiyah Nahiyah in Al-Suqaylabiyah District, Hama. According to the Syria Central Bureau of Statistics (CBS), Tal Eltiten had a population of 435 in the 2004 census.
