= Morad Daoud =

Syrian writer and sculptor (born 1960)

- مراد داؤد
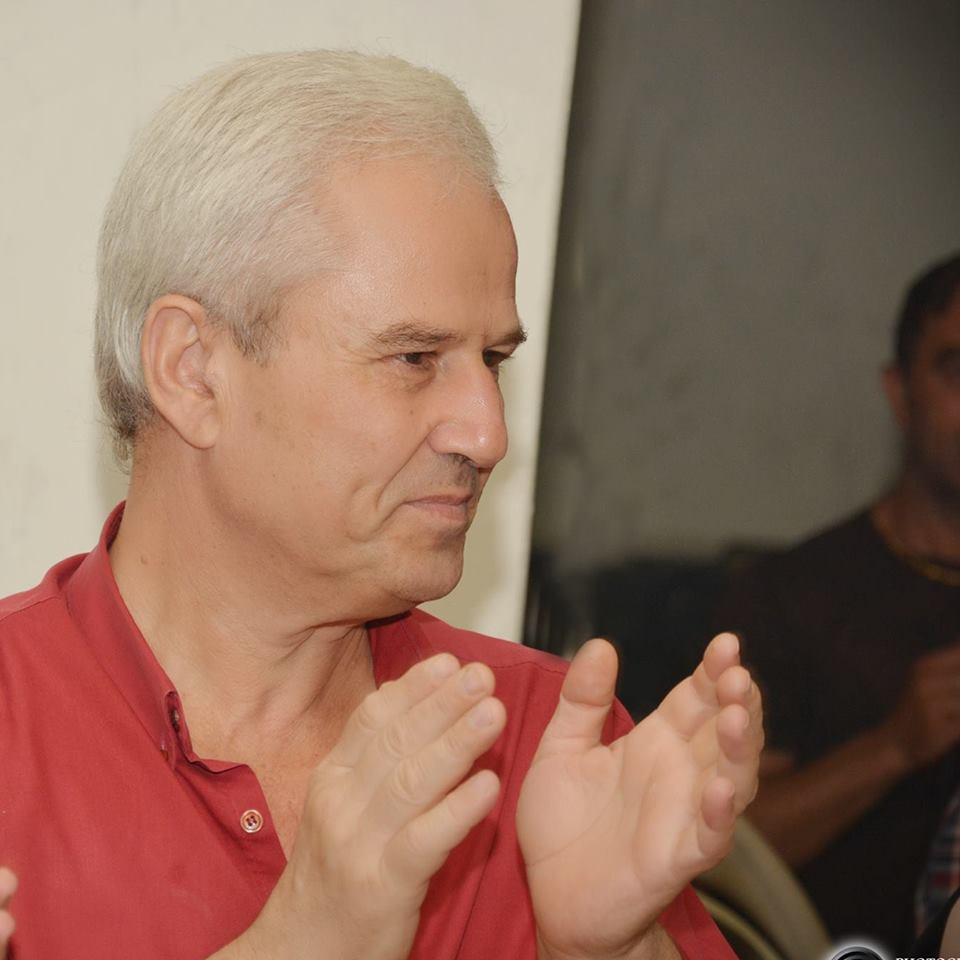
- Born: 2 August 1960 (age 66); Salamiyah,Syria
- Education: industrial electricity secondary school
- Partner: Halah Daoud
- Writing career
- Language: arabic
- Subject: novels
- Website: moraddaoud.site123.me

Morad Daoud (born 2 August 1960, Salamyieh) is a Syrian writer and sculptor.

== Early life ==
He obtained a vocational secondary certificate in industrial electricity. He worked as a staff member of the Defense Industries Corporation until his retirement in 2011, where he completed his literary work and sculpture. He is married and has three sons.

Artistic career

He finished his first novel (A Confession of an important man) in 2005, and published it in 2008. In 2010, he published two novels, The Hasty and The Dreams Continue.

In 2011 he published a police novel Folding claws. In 2014 he finished his story collection (al-Ghawader) and the novel Half-Night tales.

He said, [coming from history] to tell what happened through the notes of a louse which visited the heads of several of them and encountered in the trail, and was punctuated by some stories during a session of serenity with those we love late night "Half-Night tales". As well as those greetings to Aleppo steadfast with sculptures of life wood."

== Exhibitions ==
He participated in several art exhibitions showing his wood sculptures:

- Exhibition "Greetings to Munther Shehawi" held at the Friends of Salamyieh Society.
- "Toward Aleppo" exhibition, at the Cultural Center in Salmiya.
