= Hanna Abboud =

Syrian writer

Hanna Abboud (Arabic: حنا عبود) is an author, critic, translator, and mythographer, born in the village of Qalatiyya in the district of Tal Kalakh in the Homs governorate in 1937. He was educated in Homs, graduated from Damascus University with a BA in Arabic Language and Literature, and worked as a teacher, in addition to his work in editing the magazine "Foreign Literature" and "The Literary Attitude" magazine issued by the Arab Writers Union in Damascus. He is a member of the Literary Criticism Society of the Arab Writers Union. He is considered one of the critics of poetry in the second half of the twentieth century. He has authored numerous books on criticism of philosophical and political thought, literary economics, translation of criticism and literary theory.

In philosophical, social and political translations, he has published 16 books discussing fictional socialism, historical materialism and the struggle of ideas, including: A Brief History of Philosophy, the Holy Family and Social Sciences. He lectured and participated in many literary and intellectual seminars and conferences in Syria, Lebanon, Tunisia, Libya, Saudi Arabia, the Arab Emirates and Yugoslavia.

== His life ==
He spent his childhood in an Orthodox orphanage in Homs after the death of his parents when he was five years old. He spent eight years in the orphanage, which had a great impact on the formation of his literary personality, his learning of music and his deepening in reading and literature. He wrote the spinning poem while in middle school and he stayed for more than three years while writing poetry. He was the first to obtain a high school diploma in his modest village.

He received his studies in Homs and graduated from Damascus University with a BA in Arabic language and worked as a teacher until 1989. He considered it a patriotic duty. He has won several awards, including the Arab Writers Union Appreciation Award in literary criticism.

== Works ==
Among his most prominent books:

- The Realist School of Modern Arab Criticism – Study – Damascus 1978.
- The theater of closed circuits – study – Damascus 1978.
- The Great Displacement and its Impact on Arab Literature – Damascus 1979.
- Post-war Realism – Study – Damascus 1980.
- Adam's apple – a study in Lawrence literature – Beirut 1980.
- Wild bees and bitter honey – a study in contemporary Syrian poetry – Damascus 1982.
- Social Sciences – Translation – Damascus 1981.
- The Clash of Ideas in the Modern Era – translation – Damascus 1981.
- Brief History of Philosophy – translation – Beirut 1971.
- The Poem and the Body – Study – Damascus 1988.
- Modernity through history – a study – Damascus 1989.
- Chapters from Literary Economics – Study – Damascus 1997.

In addition to a large number of books that he translated on literary criticism, philosophy, history, and literature.

== Among his books also ==
| Book name | Book details |
|---|---|
| Encyclopedia of World Myths | In our Arab library there are encyclopedias on medicine, engineering, pharmacology ... etc., but there are no encyclopedias that include international myths, there are dictionaries of Babylonian, Phoenician or Egyptian myths, but according to our knowledge there is no encyclopedia that includes all the myths of the world, and I have avoided in this encyclopedia as much as possible, impartiality and objectivity. There are myths that were wronged for several reasons, such as the myths of Aconas and Arab myths, and the expansion of Greek and Roman myths due to the presence of references and sources in abundance, however we tried to present these myths in a brief presentation, selecting them from the manifestations that have become common in literature, especially in English poetry. On this occasion, I admit that the Encyclopedia (Bulfinch) was rich in linking myths with literature and primarily English poetry. As for eastern myths, they have few sources and references due to the wars between ancient empires, and Western scholars have not shown interest in myths as in literature. The orientalists talked about Arabic literature at length, but their talk about Arab myths was few, and in the encyclopedia issued by all the Syrian gods and myths there are such as (Haddad or Adad – Baal – Baal Shamim – Tamuz – Adonis – Astarte ... etc.). The book was printed and published by Dar Al-Hiwar for Publishing and Distribution 2018. |
| Global Mythology | This book tries to present most types of global mythology, and to clarify the links between them. Rather, it confirms that they are all based on one niche to know the psychological endowment of the phenomena of the universe and life. This book includes the myths of Africa, Asia, the Americas, Oceania, Europe, Greek, Egyptian and Phratian mythology, and India's mythology, and simplifies and analyzes information for the poet, writer, researcher and ordinary reader. The author describes the mythology of the Aztecs (a name given to the peoples of central Mexico and the Aztecs meaning white land) as the mythology of sacrifice and waiting or fatal mythology, This start out from their interest in the solar calendar, so that until the fifth sun period is complete, human sacrifices are necessary to maintain the cycle of rain, and they differ from others in the issue of sacrifice as it was a solution to the problem of nature that suffers from suffocation that only human blood can open. Publisher, Arab Writers Union, Damascus, 2009. |
| The Divine Comedy | Dante's primary poetic work, The Divine Comedy, continues to interrogate global poetic modernity and in various languages stimulate translation after another. Dante himself wrote that his work is open to multiple readings, literal, allegorical, poetic, theological and mythical (Allegory). However, reading poetry-philosophy is prevalent today. About this creative work and its author, the talk revolves around in this book, where the reader first finds a general and concise version in which he immediately stands on the basic elements that should be known about the work, its owner, and its place in the poetic creation, and in whom it lies. Then the reader will stop at a critical or scholastic entry in which the researcher relied on a number of the major readings placed in Dante and his "Divine Comedies" (Borges, Ricchet, Gerard, Jacotier, etc.). These readings carry greater depth and detail. The reader may read this entry before reading the translation of the three parts with its 100 chants, or return to reading it after diving into the poetic world of Dante. For: The Arab Foundation for Studies and Publishing (2002). |
