= Muhammad Al-Tunji =

Syrian linguist (1933–2021)

Muhammad Altunji
- Born: 1933; Aleppo, Syria
- Died: 4 August 2021 (aged 87–88)
- Occupations: Lexicographer, linguist

Muhammad Altunji (Arabic: محمد ألتونجي/Muḥammad Altūnjī; 1933 – 4 August 2021) was a Syrian linguist and author. He received his PhD in Persian language from University of Tehran in 1966 and received his bachelor's degree in Arabic literature from University of Damascus in 1955 also received high Honorary degree of PhD in Arabic literature from Saint Joseph University.

He received Indian Prize from UNESCO in 1970, a prize from the president of the University of Aleppo in 1986 and a prize from the president of the University of Benghazi in 1989.

Al-Tunji was a professor and assistant professor at universities like Damascus University (1966–1970), University of Benghazi (1971–1975), University of Aleppo (1975–1976). He was teaching Arabic language in the China for three months in 1979. He was visiting scholar in some universities like University of Budapest (1982), University of Exeter (1984).

Al-Tunji died on 4 August 2021.

== Bibliography ==
- Mu jam a lam matn al-hadith man warad dhikruhum fi Hadith
- Sha irat fi asr al-Nubuwwah
- Persian Arabic dictionary (1993) also transliterated "The Golden Dictionary" by Muhammad Al-Tunji
- Asma' al-Kutub
- Diwan al-Amir Abi Firas al-Himdani
- Al-Mujam al-Mufassal fi Tafsir Gharib
