= The Jar: A Tale From the East =

1999 Syrian Islamic animated film by Ammar Al Sharbaji

- Directed by: Ammar Al Sharbaji
- Written by: Ahmad Natouf
- Produced by: Tahsin Mzark
- Production company: Star Animation
- Distributed by: Fine Media Group
- Release date: 1999
- Running time: 63 minutes
- Country: Syria
- Language: Arabic

The Jar: A Tale From the East is a 1999 Syrian animated film directed by Ammar Al Sharbaji and written by Ahmad Natouf. Produced by Star Animation, it is considered Syria's first feature-length animated film. The film is based on a hadith (religious tradition) of the Islamic prophet Muhammad narrated over 1,400 years ago during the early Islamic civilisation, and explores themes of honesty, integrity, and the struggle between good and evil.

== Plot ==
Set in a Middle Eastern village, the story follows a poor but virtuous family who discovers a lost treasure buried in a jar beneath their new home. Committed to returning the jar to its rightful owner, the family faces opposition from a jealous and greedy neighbour who covets the treasure and repeatedly foils their attempts. An adventure unfolds as the townspeople try to solve the mystery of the jar's ownership. A comedic subplot features two mice who steal eggs from the family, only to be thwarted by the family's pet squirrel.

== Production ==
The film was produced by Star Animation, a Syrian animation studio founded on 6 July 1997 in Sahnaya, a suburb south of Damascus. The studio was licensed by the Syrian Chamber of Film and Television Industry and has produced both 2D and 3D animation for series, films, advertisements, and educational content. Director Ammar Al Sharbaji had previously worked on Iftah Ya Simsim, the Arabic-language version of Sesame Street.

== Release ==
The film was originally released in Arabic in 1999 and was subsequently dubbed into English, Spanish, and French for international distribution. North American distribution was handled by Fine Media Group, a company established in August 2000 with the mission of providing quality animated feature films and educational videos. The film was released on VHS and DVD, with the DVD version released in NTSC format in April 2005.

== Voice cast (English version) ==
- Tony Daniels
- Jeff Lumby
- John Stocker
- Barbara Radecki
- Julie Lemieux
- Chris Marren
- Carolyn Scott
- Oliver Dawson
- Ron Rubin
- François Klanfer

== Reception ==
The film received endorsements from several family media organisations. The Dove Foundation approved it for all ages, describing it as "a charming movie with lovable characters" that "highlights the ethics and virtues every family values". The Film Advisory Board, an organisation founded in 1975 to recognise quality family-oriented entertainment, gave the film its Award of Excellence. The Coalition for Quality Children's Media also endorsed the film, and it received a Finalist Award at the Santa Clarita International Film Festival.

Fine Media Group claimed that the film "received rave reviews" and was shown in children's hospitals across the United States through the Dove Movie Channel programme.

== Legacy ==
The Jar established Star Animation's reputation in the Syrian animation industry. The studio later produced other animated works, including short films such as Laila and the Wolf. Syria's second feature-length animated film, The Jasmine Birds directed by Sulafa Hijazi, was not released until 2009.

== See also ==
- List of Islamic films
- Cinema of Syria
- The Boy and the King
- Muhammad: The Last Prophet
