= Nazih Kawakibi =

Nazih Kawakibi (1 April 1946 – 7 March 2009) was a Syrian architect and a historian of architecture. Kawakibi was a professor at Damascus University, faculty of architecture. He taught a variety of subjects including; descriptive geometry, shadows in perspective, the history of early Christianity and Islamic architecture, lighting and acoustics.

== Positions and rules ==
He was a member of the friends of the old city of Damascus; a watchdog group on the conservation work in the old city. He was known to be an activist, whose love of his city guided his actions in communities and historic conservation in Damascus and in general.

He had collected a significant archive on the material culture of the old city of Damascus and other towns and cities in Syria.
