= Abdulkarim Baderkhan =

Syrian poet, translator and critic

Abdulkarim Baderkhan (Arabic: عبد الكريم بدرخان) (born 22 November 1986) is a Syrian poet, translator and critic. Starting his career in February 2006, he published three poetry collections, and translated seven books from English into Arabic. Also, he published articles, critical studies and translations in several Arabic newspapers and magazines.

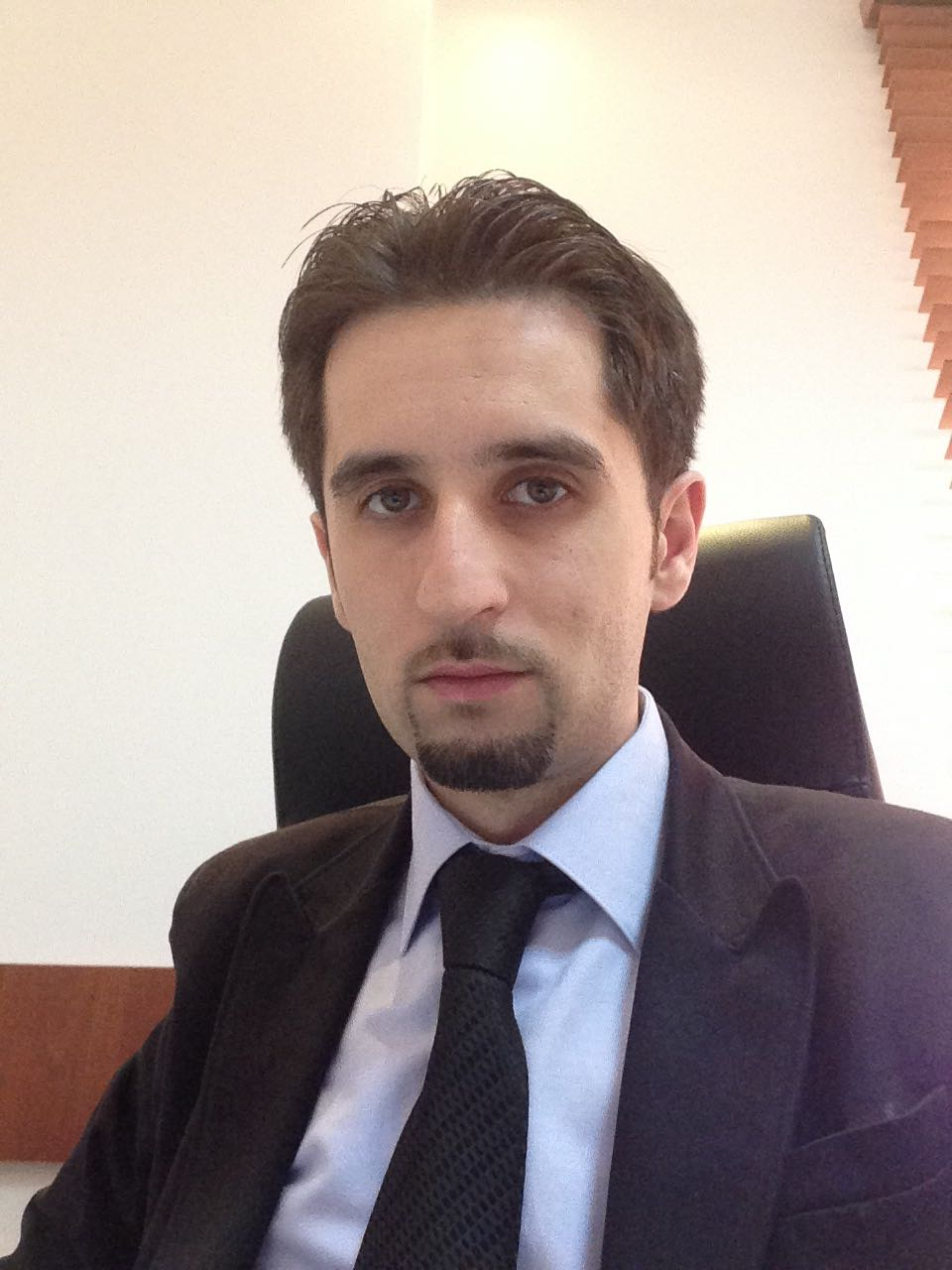
Abdulkarim Baderkhan. Gaziantep, Turkey. May 2015.

== Biography ==
=== Family and education ===
Baderkhan was born to a well-educated middle-class family in Homs, Syria in 1986. He became interested in a diverse collections of books, films, and music records and found himself surrounded by bold discussions about history, religion, literature and art. His father Adeeb Baderkhan (Arabic: أديب بدرخان) was a well-known educator in Homs, who published a novel in 2006 Memory of Migration (Arabic: ذاكرة الرحيل) in which he described his grandparents’ migration from north of Caucasus to the Middle East during the last quarter of the 19th century. His uncle Mohammad Baderkhan (Arabic: محمد بدرخان) is a film director, translator, and writer. He has directed films and television series in Syria, translated several literary works from Russian into Arabic, and published a novel “Sons of The Rain" (Arabic: أبناء المطر).

In October 2004, Baderkhan chose to enter Faculty of Law in Damascus University, but felt out of place, so he spent his university years reading Arabic literature at home by using his father's books. Then, he started reading English literature by borrowing his friends' academic books.

=== Revolution and exile ===
In 2011, he was a strong supporter of the Arab Spring, and wrote related poems during the first weeks, one of them is: "Dairies of The Syrian Wound" (Arabic: يوميات الجرح السوري). Then, he criticized the revolution harshly, when he saw the Islamic groups stepping to the front and taking the lead.

Baderkhan decided to leave Syria in 2013 due to security reasons. He lived in Egypt first, then moved to Turkey where he worked in the humanitarian field. He moved to Norway in November 2015, and he is still living there as a political refugee.

== Poetry ==
=== Beginning and awards ===
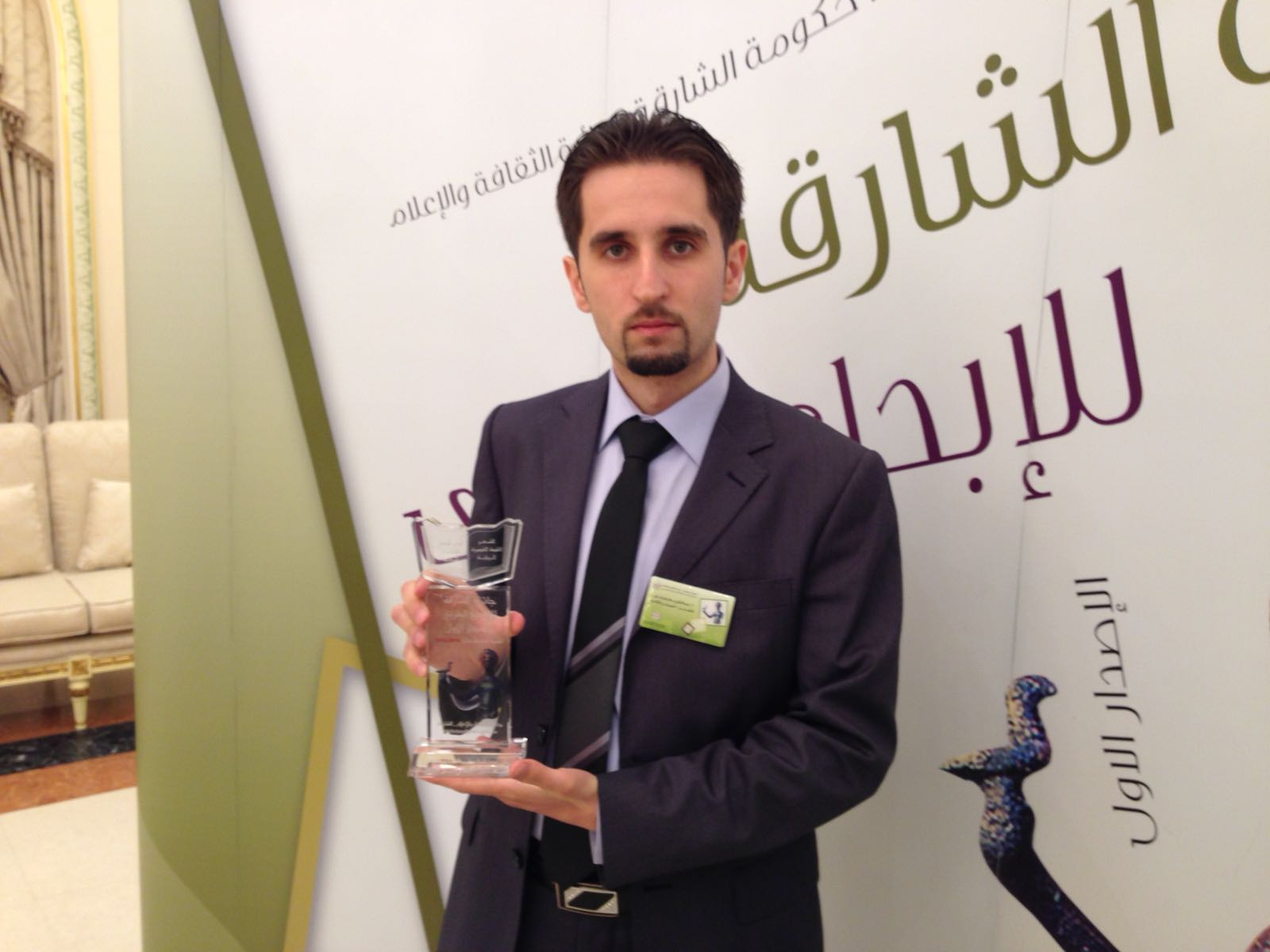
Syrian poet Abdulkrim Baderkhan celebrating his winning of "Sharja Award for Arab Creativeness" in Sharja, UAE - April 2014.

Baderkhan published a poem for the first time in “Al-Thawra” newspaper in February 2006. Then, his poems were welcomed by most editors and publishers in Syria.

In 2008, he participated in the “Festival of Young Poets” which was held in Homs and won the first place. Then, he won five poetry awards in 2009: “Arab Writers Union Award”, “National Union of Syrian Students Award”, “Spring of Literature Award”, “Golan Award” and “Okaz Award”. In 2014, he was awarded “Al-Sharja Award for Arab Creativeness” (Arabic: جائزة الشارقة للإبداع العربي) which is considered one of the most important literary awards in the Arab world, for his first poetry collection: “Funeral of The Bride” (Arabic: جنازة العروس).

=== Criticism and assessment ===
Atiya Massouh (Arabic: عطية مسوح) a Syrian critic and Marxist thinker, praised Baderkhan's poetry in his critical book: “Poetic Lighthouses” (Arabic: منارات شعرية), and wrote a chapter on the philosophy of sadness in his poetry. Another Syrian critic, Mohammad Taha Al-Othman (Arabic: محمد طه العثمان) wrote a chapter about Baderkhan's poetry in his critical book: “Eagerness of Text and Horizon of Image” (Arabic: توق النص وأفق الصورة).

Among writers who wrote about his poetry: Mazen Aktham Suleiman in his study: “Critical Approach to Syrian Poetry in The Time of Revolution and Ruin”, published in “An-Nahar” newspaper, Wajiha Abdulrahman and Mabrouka Ali in “Al-Arab” newspaper.

Some of Baderkhan's poems were translated into English, French and German.

== Translation ==
He started his translation career when he became interested in English romantic poetry of the 19th century. During 2009 and 2010 he translateda number of poems by Wordsworth, Byron, Shelley, Keats and others. In the following years he translated many poems, short stories, articles from English into Arabic.

His style in poetry translating was praised by many Arab translators and critics. He was the first to translate Maya Angelou, Sara Teasdale, Naomi Shihab Nye and Raymond Carver into Arabic. However, he is mostly known as Bukowski's translator in the Arab world.

In prose translation, Baderkhan was the first to translate César Aira into Arabic. His translation of Bukowski’s novel “Hollywood” was highly appreciated, and his introduction to Venus in Furs was the first Arabic study in Masochism and Sacher-Masoch literature.

== List of works ==
=== Poetry collections (Arabic) ===
- “Funeral of The Bride” (Arabic: جنازة العروس). Department of Culture in Sharjah. Sharjah, 2014.
- “As I desire You and More” (Arabic: كما أشتهيكِ وأكثرْ). Al-Adham Publishing House. Cairo, 2014.
- “The Color of Water” (Arabic: لون الماء). Fadaat Publishing House. Amman, 2017.

=== Poetry translations (English into Arabic) ===
- “Phenomenal Woman”. Maya Angelou. 1st version; Al-Adham Publishing House. Cairo, 2015. 2nd version; Raya Publishing House. Ramallah, 2017.
- “Love Songs”. Sara Teasdale. Al-Adham Publishing House. Cairo, 2015.
- “Alone with Everybody”. Charles Bukowski. Fadaat Publishing House. Amman, 2017.

=== Novel translations (English into Arabic) ===
- “The Literary Conference”. Cesar Aira. Masciliana Editions. Tunisia, 2016.
- “Hollywood”. Charles Bukowski. 1st version; Al-Kamel Publishing. Beirut, 2017. 2nd version; Masciliana Editions. Tunisia, 2017.
- “Burning Secret”. Stefan Zweig. Masciliana Editions. Tunisia, 2017.
- “Venus in Furs”. Leopold von Sacher-Masoch.
- “Women without Men”. Shahrnush Parsipur. Seven Page Publishing. 2019.

=== Notable essays and studies ===
- “On Syrian Poetry: Eros, Thanatos and Sexual Personae”. (Published on 15 February 2018).
- “On Syrian Poetry: Attitudes toward Time, Space and Love”. (Published on 24 February 2016).
- “Binaries and Trinities”. (Published on 20 May 2015).
- “Nietzsche and Nazism: An Illusionary Relation”. (Published on 4 December 2014).
- “Intellectual Conversions in The Syrian Revolution”. (Published on 11 November 2013).
