= Assad John Haloute =

Sir Assad John Haloute is a co-founder and executive director of the Chefette fast food chain in Barbados.

Haloute was born in San Fernando, Trinidad and is of Syrian origin. He migrated to Barbados in 1971. After migrating, he founded Chefette Restaurants one year later in 1972. The restaurant chain now boasts 15 outlets islandwide: 10 drive-thrus, 8 playgrounds, and 2 Barbecue Barns (fast casual dining).

== Honours ==
- 2019: Knight Bachelor for services to the hospitality industry.
