= Higher Institute of Dramatic Arts (Damascus) =

Art academy in Damascus, Syria

Coordinates: 33°30′44″N 36°16′44″E

The Higher Institute of Dramatic Arts (HIDA, Arabic: الْمَعْهَدُ الْعَالِي لِلْفُنُونِ الْمَسْرَحِيَّةِ, romanized: al-Maʿhad al-ʿĀlī li l-Funūn al-Masraḥīyah) was founded in Damascus, Syria, in 1977 by academics such as the playwright Saadallah Wannous, theatre critic Ghassan al-Maleh and professor of theatre at Damascus University, Hannan Kassab Hassan. The institute initiated a new phase in the development of theatre in Syria through the preparation of a new generation of playwrights, theatre directors and actors in aspects of modern dramatic arts on an academic basis, including the actor Fares Al-Helou and playwrights Liwaa Yazji and Mohammad Al Attar. The institute initially included five departments: Acting, Literary Criticism, Dramatic Arts, Scenography, and Theatre Techniques, with a department for Dance added later.

An artist of the younger generation is Noura Mourad, an expert in dance and movement in theatre, who became a teacher at the institute for modern dance and performance after her graduation. Mourad is also director of Leish Troupe, an ensemble for movement theatre that won the prize for best scenography in the Cairo International Festival of Experimental Theater in 2000. In her study titled "Syrian Radical Dabka", ethnomusicologist Shayna Silverstein described the changes in social interpretations and performances of the Middle-Eastern dabke folk dance as performed in Syria. Further, Silverstein reported about a contemporary dance show in 2009 by Mourad and her troupe, titled “Congratulations!”. Focusing on the performance of dance in Syrian weddings, this choreography included issues of gender and power in the institution of marriage and the general doublestandards facing women in Syrian society.

The institute has succeeded in making its mark on the theatre and dramatic arts scene of the Middle East, with performances in Kuwait, Egypt, Jordan, Lebanon, Germany and other countries. In his academic study on the social position of intellectuals and market forces, exemplified by commercial TV in Syria, Adwan Ziad, a former professor at the institute, "explores how the Higher Institute of Dramatic Arts in Damascus achieved an exceptional degree of prestige in Syrian cultural life. Although operating under a dictatorship in a conservative country, HIDA still enjoyed unusual margins of curricula autonomy and free expression in a country that repressed other cultural and educational sectors."

Beginning in late 2011, the Syrian arts community experienced a marked shift in location. For a number of younger alumni of the Higher Institute of Dramatic Arts, who had completed their studies in the early 2000s, Beirut emerged as the first major place of relocation. By 2013, the Lebanese capital had developed into an important hub for emerging Syrian artistic work. From 2014 onward, a further phase of displacement followed, with many artists moving on to countries in Western Europe and beyond; within this context, Berlin became a key place of settlement for parts of the Syrian theatre community.

In addition to founding members Saadallah Wannous, Ghassan al-Maleh and Hannan Kassab Hassan, playwright and later Minister of Culture Riad Ismat also taught at the institute. Further, Kassab Hassan published a trilingual dictionary (French-English-Arabic) for theatre studies and performing arts.

== Notable alumni ==
- Omar Abu Saada
- Giana Eid
- Sabah Jazairi
- Taim Hasan
- Dima Kandalaft
- Kosai Khauli
- Rouzaina Lazkani
- Samer al-Masry
- Sulafa Memar
- Rania Mleihi
- Nanda Mohammad
- Amal Omran
- Mey Seifan
- Fadi Skeiker
- Jamal Suliman
- Fares Yaghi
- Bassem Yakhour
- Helen Al-Janabi

== Location ==
The Higher Institute of Dramatic Arts is situated near Umayyad Square next to the Higher Institute of Music and the Damascus Opera House.

== Literature ==
- Dubois, Simon (2023). "Young Documentary Theatre on Syrian Stages: An Aesthetic of Circulation, Exile, and Engagement". In Larzillière, Pénélope (ed.). The Global Politics of Artistic Engagement. Beyond the Arab Uprisings. Brill. pp. 181–209. doi:10.1163/9789004518452_008. ISBN 978-90-04-51844-5.
