= Hisham Kafarneh =

Syrian television actor and voice actor (born 1959)

- هشام كفارنة
- Born: May 20, 1959 (age 67); Damascus Syria
- Occupation: Actor -
- Years active: 1982–present

Hisham Kafarneh (Arabic: هشام كفارنة; born 20 May 1959) is a Syrian television actor and voice actor.

== Early life ==
Hisham Kafarneh is a representative, author, and theater director. He attained a Bachelor of Arts from the Higher Institute of Dramatic Art in Damascus in 1982.

== Career ==
He works in many Series in Syria such as Acre Prison, The Last Man, The Curse of Clay, Last the Knights and others. He also works in Dubbing cartoon and anime such as Kaiketsu Zorro, Slam Dunk, Remi, Nobody's Girl, Dragon Quest: Dai no Daibōken and other.
