= Yahya Alkafri =

Syrian television actor and voice actor

- يحيى الكفري
- Born: Syria
- Occupation: Actor - Voice acting

Yahya Alkafri (Arabic: يحيى الكفري; born in Syria) is a Syrian television actor and voice actor.

== Early life ==
He graduated from the Higher Institute of Theatrical Arts in 1988, and before that, won the Engineering Diploma Decor Interior Department in 1983. He is a member of the National Theater in Syria. Among the highlights of his works (the civilization of the Arabs, punishment, relative calm) are mostly in TV, in the field of dubbing animation.

== Filmography ==
=== Television ===
- Arab civilization
- Punishment
- Relative calm
- Dubbing heartbeat Arabic
- Lawrence of Arabia
- Bramble
- The dust brothers
- Justice desert

=== Dubbing roles ===
- The Mask: Animated Series as Stanley Ipkiss/The Mask
- Detective Conan - Ninzaburo Shiratori
- Samurai 7 as Shimada Kambei
- Kamen Rider Ryuki
- Wolverine and the X-Men - Nightcrawler
- Batman: The Animated Series as The Joker (Venus dub)
- Honō no Dōkyūji: Dodge Danpei
- Hakugei: Legend of the Moby Dick
- Sangokushi
- Inuyasha as Myoga
- One Piece as Mr. 2
- The Flintstones as Barney Rubble (2nd voice)
- Beyblade as Michael Summers
- Magical Princess Minky Momo
- Grimm's Fairy Tale Classics
- Topo Gigio as Topo Gigio
- The Sword and the Chess of Death
- Iron Kid as Steeljaw Jack
- Hunter × Hunter as Franklin, Seaquant, Nostrade Butler, Chrollo Lucilfer (episodes 51–56), Bean
- Danball Senki as Junichirou Yamano, Yoshimitsu Kaidou, Masashi Hosoi
- Masha and the Bear
- Masha's Tales (uncredited)
- Beyblade: Metal Fusion as Ryuga
- Beyblade: Metal Masters as Ryuga
- Beyblade: Metal Fury as Ryuga
- Ben 10 - Dr. Animo, Stinkfly
- Opti-Morphs
- Super Wings - Big Wing (Venus Centre version)
- The Fairly OddParents as Sheldon Dinkleberg (Classical Arabic version) (uncredited)
- Sonic Boom (season 2) - Cubot (First Voice)
- Ranma ½
