= Amal Omran =

Syrian actress

- أمل عمران
- Born: June 3, 1968 (age 57)
- Occupation: Actress - Voice acting

Amal Omran (Arabic: أمل عمران, born June 3, 1968), Syrian actress and director of Syria play.

== Life and career ==
Amal Omran graduated from the Higher Institute of Theatrical Arts. She received a scholarship to study in the United States of America and later did a theatrical training course in Czechoslovakia. She also studied expressive dance in the United States.

Omran also held and led acting workshops for performers and helped establish the Teatro Institute for the Performing Arts, discovering and training young talents.

Omran is also a member of the Artists Union.

Omran's first stage experience was in the play, Rape.

== Works ==
=== Dubbing ===
- Bakusō Kyōdai Let's & Go!! – Ryo Takaba
- Cyborg Kuro-chan – Kuro (first voice)
- Detective Conan – Genta Kojima (first voice), Eri Kisaki (first voice)
- Digimon Adventure 02 – Ken Ichijouji
- Idol Densetsu Eriko – Yasuko Nakata
- Justice League – Hawkgirl
- Mobile Suit Gundam Wing – Relena Peacecraft/Darlian
- ¡Mucha Lucha! - The Flea (Venus Centre version)
- The Powerpuff Girls – Samara (Buttercup) (Venus Centre version)
- Shin Hakkenden – Rei Yozora
- Virtua Fighter – Sarah Bryant
- Xiaolin Showdown – Omi (season 1 only)
- What's New, Scooby-Doo? – Daphne Blake (Venus Centre version)
