= Anjy Al-Yousif =

Syrian actress

- أنجي اليوسف
- Born: Damascus, Syria
- Occupation: Actress - Voice acting
- Years active: 1981–present

Anjy Al-Yousif (Arabic: أنجي اليوسف) is a Syrian actress.

== Life and career ==
She was born in Damascus and got a degree in Performing Arts in 1981. She has participated since 1990 in voice acting, her several works being Captain Majid, Care Bears, Blue Blink in 1990, the role of the aunt of Cinderella, Hani in the Big Race, the role of the snake in the series Argai, and the role of the Amani in the series Slam Dunk.

== Works ==
=== Dubbing ===
- Digimon Adventure as Tai Kamiya, Kari Kamiya
- Nadia: The Secret of Blue Water as Jean
- Pretty Rhythm as Omi Harune
- Romeo's Blue Skies as Angelao
- Ranma ½
