= List of Islam-related films =

This is a list of films, television serials and programmes related to Islamic civilization, i.e. Islam, Islamic history and Islamic culture. For ease of classification this article defines the following terms as such:

- "Documentary" refers to educational films and series of an informative nature.
- "Film" refers to dramatic films following a narrative/story.
- "Television" refers to serials, programmes and dramas that consist of more than one episode.

== Short films ==
- 1001 Inventions and the Library of Secrets, featuring Ben Kingsley as Al-Jazari.

== Religion ==
=== General ===
Title	Year	Type	Country	Based On	Channel	Description
Khalid ibn Al Walid (TV Series)	1958	Film	Egypt	Early history	-	-
Yusuf ile Züleykha	1970	Film	Turkey-Iran	Joseph		Based on the Islamic account of Joseph
The Message	1976	Film	Libya	Life of Muhammad		A film on the life of Muhammad.
Shaheen	1980	TV Series	Pakistan	Early history	-	Based on the historical novel by Naseem Hijazi depicting the Muslims in Spain and the Fall of Granada
A Door to the Sky	1982	Film	Morocco	Sufism		About a woman who opens a Sufi shelter for women.
The Noon of the 10th Day	1988	Documentary	Iran	Early history	-	Shia Muslim practice of Mourning on the 10th of Muharram
The Sword of Tipu Sultan	1990	TV Series	India	Early history	DD National	Portrayal of Tipu Sultan, ruler of Mysore.
Ali (Tv Series)	1992	TV Series	Iran	Early history	-	Life of Ali from becoming the Caliph to his assassination.
Ayyub e Payambar	1993	Film	Iran	Job		Based on the Islamic account of Job
The Fateful Day	1994	Film	Iran	Early history	-	-
Loneliest Leader	1997	TV Series	Iran	Early history	-	Last part of Hasan ibn Ali's life
The Men of Angelos	1997	Television	Iran	People of Cave		Based on the Islamic tradition of the Sleepers in the Cave described in Surah Al-Kahf.
Islam: Empire of Faith	2000	Documentary	United States	Life of Muhammad	PBS	On the life of Muhammad, spread of Islam, and the rise and fall of Islamic civilizations.
Islam: Empire of Faith	2000	Documentary	United States	Early history	PBS	History of Islam narrated by Sir Ben Kingsley.
Velayate eshgh	2000	TV Series	Iran	Early history	-	Life of Ali al-Ridha, the 8th Imam of Twelver Shi'ism.
Inside Islam	2002	Documentary	United States	General	History Channel	Covers various aspects of Islam.
Muhammad: Legacy of a Prophet	2002	Documentary	United States	Life of Muhammad	PBS	A documentary on Muhammad as seen by Muslims.
Saint Mary	2002	Film	Iran	Mary		Based on the Islamic account of Mary, mother of Jesus.
Saqr Qoraish	2002	TV Series	-	Early history	-	Abd al-Rahman I and the founding of the Emirate of Cordoba
Al Hajjaj	2003	TV Series	-	Early history	-	Series on Al-Hajjaj ibn Yusuf.
Inside Mecca	2003	Documentary	United States	Hajj	National Geographic	On the Hajj.
Rabee' Qortoba	2003	TV Series	-	Early history	-	Muslims living in Cordoba in Al-Andalus
An Islamic History of Europe	2005	Documentary	UK	Early history	BBC	History of Islam in Europe, presented by Rageh Omaar
Mulouk Al-Tawa'ef	2005	TV Series	Syria	Early history	-	-
What the Ancients Did for Us	2005	Documentary	UK	Early history	BBC	Episode 1: The Islamic World.
When the Moors Ruled in Europe	2005	Documentary	UK	Early history	Channel 4	History of Islamic Spain.
Khalid ibn al-Walid(TV series)	2006	TV Series	-	Early history	-	Life of Khalid ibn Walid.
Cities of Light: The Rise and Fall of Islamic Spain	2007	Documentary	-	Early history	-	Civilization of Islamic Spain.
Ten Days	2007	Documentary	Pakistan	Ashura		An ethnomusicological film about the Ashura festival in Pakistan.
The Caravan of the Andalusian Manuscripts	2007	Documentary	Spain	Early history	-	Tracing scientific manuscripts in Andalusia.
The Messiah	2007	Film	Iran	Jesus		Based on the Islamic account of Jesus Christ
The Muslim Jesus	2007	Documentary	UK	Jesus	ITV	On the Islamic view of Jesus.
Abraham: The Friend of God	2008	Film	Iran	Abraham		Based on the Islamic account of Abraham.
Muhammad: The Final Legacy	2008	Television	Arab	Life of Muhammad		An Arab series also known as Qamar Bani Hashim.
Prophet Joseph	2008	Television	Iran	Joseph		Based on the Islamic account of Joseph
Science and Islam	2009	Documentary	UK	Early history	BBC	Science in the medieval Islamic world featuring Jim Al-Khalili
Bohlol Dana - A Sage of Baghdad	2010	Film	India	Early history	-	About Bahlool, a companion of Imam Musa al-Kadhim
Mokhtarnameh	2010	TV Series	Iran	Early history	-	Life of Mukhtar al-Thaqafi, the Battle of Karbala, and Hasan and Husayn.
The Kingdom of Solomon	2010	Film	Iran	Solomon		Based on the Islamic account of the Israelite prophet-king Solomon.
If he were among us	2011	Television	Unknown			Details not provided.
Koran by Heart	2011	Documentary	United States	Quran	HBO	On the annual children's Quran recitation contest held in Cairo.
Muawiya, Hassan and Hussein	2011	TV Series	-	Early history	-	Events during the lives of Hasan ibn Ali and Husayn ibn Ali.
Ramadan Roundup	2011	Television	Unknown			Details not provided.
The Life of Muhammad	2011	Documentary	UK	Life of Muhammad	BBC	A documentary on the life of Muhammad.
Understanding Islam	2011	Television	Unknown			Details not provided.
Omar	2012	TV Series	-	Early history	-	Life of the Second Rashidun Caliph, Umar ibn Khattab
Jodha Akbar	2013	TV Series	India	Early history	-	Mughal Emperor Jalaluddin Akbar and his wife Mariam-uz-Zamani.
Khaybar	2013	Television	Arab	Life of Muhammad		An Arab series on the events of the Battle of Khaybar..
Uwais Al Qarni	2013	Film	-	Early history	-	Tabi'i and Muslim saint Uwais Al-Qarni.
À la découverte de l'Aïd al-Adha	2014	Documentary	France	Eid al-Adha	Farid Dms Debah	French documentary on the Islamic festival of Eid al-Adha.
He Who Said No	2014	Film	Iran	Early history	-	Battle of Karbala and the martyrdom of Husayn ibn Ali
Muhammad: The Messenger of God	2015	Film	Iran	Life of Muhammad		Based on the early life of Muhammad. This film is controversial due to depiction of Islamic prophets amongst Muslims. See aniconism in Islam.
One Day in the Haram Arabic: يوم في الحرم (فيلم)	2017	Documentary	United States	Makkah	Arabia Pictures Al Reasah Haramin	On the Grand Mosque in the Holy Sanctuary at Makkah.
The Imam	2017	TV Series	-	Early history	-	Life of the founder of the Hanbali school of law, Imam Ahmad ibn Hanbal
You Will Die at Twenty	2019	Film	Sudan	Sufism		
The Empire (TV series)	2021	TV Series	India	Early history	Disney+ Hotstar	Zahiruddin Muhammad Babur the founder of Mughal Empire.
The Lady of Heaven	2021	Film	UK	Life of Muhammad		A film on the life of Muhammad and his daughter, Fatima.
Muawiya	2025	TV Series	Saudi Arabia	Early History	MBC	A series on the life of Muawiya ibn Abi Sufyan, the first Umayyad caliph and companion of Muhammad.
Moses the Kalimullah: At Dawn	2025	Film	Iran	Moses		

== History ==
=== Crusades and Mongol Invasions ===
==== Documentary ====
- The Sultan and the Saint (PBS, 2016) on the meeting of Egyptian Sultan Al-Kamil and St. Francis of Assisi
- The Crusades, An Arab Perspective (Al Jazeera, 2016) based on the book "The Crusades Through Arab Eyes" by Amin Maalouf

==== Film ====
- Saladin the Victorious (Egypt, 1963) on Saladin, drawing parallels between him and Gamal Abdel Nasser
- Melikşah (Turkey-Iran, 1969)
- Selahattin Eyyubi (Turkey-Iran, 1970)
- Kingdom of Heaven (2005), Western film on the Crusades, well-received in the Islamic World for its positive representation of Islam and Muslims
- Direniş Karatay (Turkey, 2018) depicting Celâleddin Karatay and Ahi Evren
- Malazgirt 1071 based on the Battle of Malazgirt

==== Television ====
- Aakhri Chataan (Urdu: The Last Rock) (Pakistan, 1985), a series based on the historical novel of the same name by Naseem Hijazi depicting the Mongol Invasion of the Khwarazm Sultanate and the subsequent Fall of Baghdad
- Salah Al-deen Al-Ayyobi (2001), an Arab series on Saladin and the Crusades
- Al-Zahir Baybars (2005), an Arab series on Mamluk Sultan Baibars
- Uyanış: Büyük Selçuklu (2020), a Turkish series on the life of Malik-Shah I and his son Ahmad Sanjar of the Seljuk Empire
- Mendirman Jaloliddin (Turkey, 2021), a series based on Jalal al-Din Mangburni and Mongol invasions
- Kudüs Fatihi Selahaddin Eyyubi (2023), a Pakistani-Turkish series on Saladin and the Crusades
- Muawiya (2025), a Saudi-Arabian series on Muawiya ibn Abi Sufyan, the first Umayyad caliph

=== Ottomans ===
==== Documentary ====
- The Ottomans: Europe's Muslim Emperors (BBC, 2013) on the Ottoman Empire
- Rise of Empires: Ottoman (Netflix, 2020)

==== Film ====
- Al Hilal (India, 1935) on the Byzantine–Ottoman Wars
- The Conquest of Constantinople (Turkey, 1951) on the Conquest of Constantinople
- Fetih 1453 (Turkey, 2012) on the Conquest of Constantinople by Sultan Mehmed II

==== Television ====
- Diriliş: Ertuğrul (Turkey, 2014) and its sequels, Kuruluş: Osman (Turkey, 2019) & Kuruluş: Orhan (Turkey, 2025) on Ertuğrul Gazi, Osman Gazi, & Orhan Gazi and the foundation of the Ottoman Empire
- Mehmed: Fetihler Sultanı (Turkey, 2024) on the reigns of Ottoman Sultan Fatih Sultan Mehmed Han II
- Fatih (Turkey, 2013) on the life of the 7th Ottoman Sultan, Mehmed II
- Mehmed: Bir Cihan Fatihi (Turkey, 2018) on Mehmed II and the Conquest of Constaniople.
- Muhteşem Yüzyıl (Turkey, 2011) on the life of the 10th Ottoman Sultan, Suleiman the Magnificent & spin-off Muhteşem Yüzyıl: Kösem (Turkey, 2015) on the life of Kösem Sultan.
- Barbaros: Sword of the Mediterranean (Turkey, 2021) on the life of Hayreddin Barbarossa, an Ottoman admiral of the 16th century
- The Last Emperor (Turkey, 2017) on the reign of the 34th Ottoman Sultan, Abdul Hamid II as viewed by emic Muslim sources
- Kingdoms of Fire (Arab, 2019) on the Ottoman Empire and the Mamluk Sultanate

=== Biopic ===
==== Documentary ====
- Al-Ghazali: The Alchemist of Happiness (2004), on the life of Islamic scholar Al-Ghazali
- Prince Among Slaves (PBS, 2006) on the life of an African Muslim enslaved in Mississippi, Abdul Rahman Ibrahima Sori
- A Road to Mecca - The Journey of Muhammad Asad (2008) on the life and conversion of Muhammad Asad
- Journey to Mecca (National Geographic, 2009) on the travels of Ibn Battuta
- The Man Who Walked Across the World (BBC Four), series of documentary travelogues following in the footsteps of 14th-century Moroccan scholar Ibn Battuta, who covered 75,000 miles, 40 countries and three continents in a 30-year odyssey

==== Film ====
- Lion of the Desert (Libya, 1981) on the life of Omar Mukhtar
- Malcolm X (1992), American film on the life, conversion and Hajj of Malcolm X
- Free Man (Turkey, 2011) on the life of Bediüzzaman Said Nursi
- Les Hommes libres (Free Men, 2011, France), on the life of Si Kaddour Benghabrit
- Buya Hamka (Indonesia, 2023), on the life of HAMKA (Haji Abdul Malik Karim Amrullah)

==== Television ====
- Al-Tabari (Egypt, 1987) on the life of Muslim historian and exegete, Ibn Jarir al-Tabari
- Roof of the World (Syria, 2007) on the journeys of medieval Arab traveller Ahmad ibn Fadlan
- The Ladder of the Sky (Iran, 2009) on Persian astronomer Jamshid Kashani

=== Sufism ===
- Yunus Emre: Aşkin Yolculuğu (Turkey, 2015) on Turkish Sufi poet Yunus Emre
- Mavera (Turkey, 2021) on the life of Turkish Sufi Ahmad Yasawi
- Haci Bayram Veli: Aşkin Yolculuğu (2022) a Turkish series on the life of Sufi Haji Bayram Veli

== Culture ==
=== General ===
==== Documentary ====
- Nations Cultures - Muslims (Iran, 1994) showcasing the life and cultures of Muslims in various countries
- On a Tightrope (2007), Uyghur documentary on the experience of Uyghur Muslims in China
- Veiled Ambition (2007)
- Seven Wonders of the Muslim World (PBS, 2008)
- Müezzin (2009), Turkish documentary about the annual Turkish competition for the best muezzin
- Islamic Art: Mirror of the Invisible World (PBS, 2012) on the development of Islamic art and architecture

==== Film ====
- Semum (Turkey, 2008), horror film dealing with subjects of devils and exorcism in Islam
- Munafik (2016) and Munafik 2 (2018), Malaysian horror films dealing with subjects of Jinn and exorcism in Islam

==== Television ====
- All-American Muslim (TLC, 2011)

=== Comedy ===
==== Documentary ====
- The Muslims Are Coming! (2013)

==== Film ====
- Looking for Comedy in the Muslim World (2005)
- Mecca I'm Coming (2019)

==== Television ====
- Little Mosque on the Prairie (CBC, 2007)
- Citizen Khan (BBC, 2012)

== See also ==
- Muhammad in film
- Maslaha
