= Omar (TV series) =

Televised early Islamic historical drama

- English title card
- Also known as: Farouk Omar; Omar Series
- Omar; عُمَرْ
- Genre: Biography; Drama; Religion; History; Serial
- Based on: Umar ibn al-Khattab
- Written by: Walid Saif
- Directed by: Hatem Ali; Chadi Abo
- Starring: Samer Ismail; Ghassan Massoud; Hassan Al-Jundi; Muna Wassef; Fethi Haddaoui; Jay Abdo; Suzan Najm Aldeen
- Voices of: Assad Khalifa (Omar)
- Composer: Fahir Atakoglu
- Country of origin: Arab World
- Original language: Arabic
- No. of seasons: 1
- No. of episodes: 31

Production
- Producers: MBC Group; Qatar TV
- Production locations: Saudi Arabia; Morocco; Qatar
- Editor: Raouf Zaza
- Running time: 44–47 minutes
- Budget: 200 million SAR

Original release
- Network: MBC1; Qatar TV; EPTV; Nessma TV; Atv; MNCTV; Nour TV; Medi1 TV
- Release: July 20 – August 18, 2012

Related
- Muhammad: The Final Legacy; Muawiya (TV series); Al-Qaqa Ibn Amr Al-Tamimi; Ahmad bin Hanbal

Omar (Arabic: عُمَرْ) or Omar Farouk (Arabic: عمر الفاروق) is a historical Arab television drama miniseries/serial produced and broadcast by MBC1, Hatem Ali serves as director, with Chadi Abo co-directing. Abo is best known for directing battle scenes and complicated visual effects projects. Co-produced by Qatar TV, the series is based on the life of Umar (c. 583–644), the second Rashidun caliph, and depicts his life from 18 years old until the moments of his death.

The series faced several high-profile controversies due to its depiction of Umar, Abu Bakr, Uthman and Ali, the four Rashidun Caliphs, along with other characters, who some Muslims believe should not be depicted, much like Muhammad. The series consists of 31 episodes and was originally aired in the month of Ramadan since July 20, 2012. Produced at a cost of 200 million Saudi riyals (est. USD53 million), filming took place in Morocco, primarily in the cities of Marrakesh, Tangier, El Jadida, Casablanca and Mohammedia.

Following initial broadcast, the series was dubbed into several languages for international broadcast, and subtitled in English on YouTube; it received great support from many different Sunni scholarly bodies and people watching it. The series was criticized by some Shia scholars and commentators for its portrayal of Ali and for what they regarded as historical inaccuracies and distortions.

== Synopsis ==
The series starts with one of the pilgrimage of caliph Omar where he delivers speeches to the pilgrims. The next scene comes with an exploration on Mecca of the caliph where he emotionally flashbacks to his own 18 year's life when he was a young boy working for his rude father Khattab ibn Nufayl. The flashback perspective of Omar shows all the past story of his life from when he was a wrestler, a businessman and above all one of the leaders of the Quraish, and then to his life after his conversion into Islam being one of the closest companions of Muhammad and an immensely devoted believer, a brave inspiration for all the contemporary Muslims and a bold warrior in all the contemporary Islamic battles. The story goes through the Meccan victory, Muhammad's death, Abu Bakr's legacy as caliph and his death, and finally Omar's legacy. From viewer's eye perspective, his legacy as caliph shows the biographical stories of improvements and complexities of his own caliphate till his assassination by Abu Lulu.

== Cast ==
=== The ten promised of paradise ===
- Samer Ismail as Umar ibn Al-Khattab (physical actor)
- Assad Khalifa as Umar ibn Al-Khattab (voice actor)
- Ghassan Massoud as Abu Bakr
- Ghanem Zrelli as Ali ibn Abi Talib
- Tamer Al-Arbeed as Uthman ibn Affan
- Ahmed Mansour as Abd al-Rahman ibn Awf
- Mahmoud Khalili as Abu Ubaidah ibn al-Jarrah
- Suhail Jbaei as Sa`d ibn Abi Waqqas
- Rami Khalaf as Saeed bin Zaid
- Nihad Sheikh Ibrahim as Talha ibn Ubayd Allah

=== Others ===
- Mehyar Khaddour as Khalid ibn al-Walid
- Faisal Al-Omairi as Bilal ibn Rabah
- Alaa' Rashidi as Ammar ibn Yasir
- Rafi Wahba as Jafar ibn Abi Talib
- Abdullah Sheikh Khamees as Yasir ibn Amer
- Baha' Tharwat as Abu Hudhayfa ibn 'Utba
- Abdel-Aziz Makhioun as Abu Talib
- Mohammad Miftah as Hamza ibn Abdul-Muttalib.
- Qasim Melho as Amr ibn al-'As
- Hisham Bahloul as Ikrimah ibn Abi Jahl
- Yazan Al-Sayed as Al-Qa'qa'a ibn Amr at-Tamimi
- Fethi Haddaoui as Abu Sufyan ibn Harb
- Jawad Al-Shakrji as Abu al-Hakam/Abu Jahl.
- Fayez Abu Dan as Abu Lahab
- Hassan Al-Jundi as Utbah ibn Rabi'ah
- Rafiq Al-Subaiei as Waraqah ibn Nawfal
- Ghazi Hussein as Umayyah ibn Khalaf
- Jalal Al-Taweel as Salman the Persian
- Ziad Twati as Wahshi ibn Harb
- Basem Dakak as Walid ibn Utbah
- May Skaf as Hind bint Utbah
- Bernadette Hudeib as Rayhana (fictional character)
- Fadi Sbeeh as Safwan ibn Umayya
- Mohammad Haddaqi as Umayr ibn Wahb
- Nadera Imran as Sajah bint Al-Harith
- Khaled Al-Qaish as Ayyash ibn Abi Rabiah
- Jaber Joukhdar as Abdullah ibn Masud
- Ghazwan Al-Safadi as Al-Walid ibn al-Walid
- Mahmoud Nasr as Zayd ibn al-Khattab
- Alfat Omar as Atiqa bint Zayd
- Siham Aseef as Layla bint al-Minhal
- Najah Safkouni as Suhayl ibn Amr
- Abdel-Karim Al-Qawasmi as Walid ibn al-Mughira
- Ghassan Azb as Huyayy ibn Akhtab
- Riyadh Wrdiyani as Salul
- Nasser Wrdiyani as Khattab ibn Nufayl
- Muna Wassef as Al-Shifa' bint Abdullah.
- Abdel-Hakim Quteifan as Malik ibn Nuwayrah
- Mohannad Quteish as Al-Muthanna ibn Haritha
- Faten Shahin as Umm Jamil bint Harb
- Andre Skaff as Suraqa bin Malik
- Fatimah Saad as Sumayyah bint Khayyat
- Qamar Murtadha as Salma Umm-ul-Khair
- Rakeen Saad as Asma bint Abu Bakr
- Nasr Shama as Uthman Abu Quhafa
- Murshad Dergham as Mughira ibn Shu'ba
- Randy Halabi as Yazid ibn Abi Sufyan
- Omar Azouzi as Al-'As ibn Wa'il
- Areej Khaddour as Fatimah bint al-Khattab
- Amn Al-Arned as Salim Mawla Abu Hudhayfa
- Yasser Abdel-Latif as Al-Najashi
- Amer Ali as Yazdegerd III
- Maram Ben Aziza as wife of Yazdegerd III (Maria)
- Jay Abdo as satrap
- Iyad Abu Al-Shamat as Hormuzan
- Jamal Abbasi as Musaylimah
- Mohammad Al Rashi as Abu Lu'lu'a Firuz
- Suzan Najm Aldeen as Borandukht
- Juliet Awad as Al-Khansa
- Mohammad Quri'ah as Heraclius
- Mustapha Tah-Tah as Mukhayriq
- Unknown Actor as Theodore Trithyrius
- Ahmad Harhash as Umar Bin Al Din

== List of episodes ==
No.	Title	Original release date
1	"Umar ibn al-Khattab's flashback to his childhood"	July 20, 2012
2	"Conveyance of Islam's last message starts"	July 21, 2012
3	"Muhammad's (SAW) message, Abu Lahab gets condemned in Surah Lahab"	July 22, 2012
4	"Family affairs, Abu Hudhayfa adopts his slave, The plan to torture and boycott Muslims."	July 23, 2012
5	"Persecution of Muslims by the Meccans"	July 24, 2012
6	"Bilal ibn Rabah gains freedom and embraces Islam."	July 25, 2012
7	"Migration to Abyssinia"	July 26, 2012
8	"Umar embraces Islam, Muhammad's (SAW) First Khutbah"	July 27, 2012
9	"Boycott against Muslims, Chaos in Masjid al-Haram"	July 28, 2012
10	"Hijrah to Yathrib, Medina, Building Al-Masjid an-Nabawi"	July 29, 2012
11	"Battle of Badr, death of Abu Jahl, Umayyah ibn Khalaf and Utbah ibn Rabi'ah"	July 30, 2012
12	"Prisoners of the Battle of Badr, The Sabbath, Quraish plan for the Second battle against Muslims"	July 31, 2012
13	"Battle of Uhud, death of Hamza ibn Abdul-Muttalib, Digging the Trench"	August 1, 2012
14	"Battle of Khandaq, death of Amr ibn Abd al-Wud, Invasion of Banu Qurayza, Treaty of Hudaibiyah"	August 2, 2012
15	"The struggle of Abu Baseer, The year of delegations, First Hajj"	August 3, 2012
16	"Khalid ibn al-Walid & 'Amr ibn al-'As embrace Islam, Death of Al-Walid ibn al-Walid, Conquest of Mecca"	August 4, 2012
17	"Abu Sufyan and some others embrace Islam, Death of the Messenger of God (SAW)"	August 5, 2012
18	"Abu Bakr becomes the first caliph, Battle against people not paying Zakat"	August 6, 2012
19	"Rise of Sajah, Ridda Wars"	August 7, 2012
20	"Battle of Yamama against Musaylimah, death of Abu Hudhayfa ibn 'Utbah, Abdullah ibn Suhayl, Zayd ibn al-Khattab and Salim Mawla ibn Abu Hudhayfa"	August 8, 2012
21	"Muslim conquest of Persia"	August 9, 2012
22	"Death of Abu Bakr, Umar becomes the second caliph, Battle of Yarmouk"	August 10, 2012
23	"Battle of Yarmouk against Theodore Trithyrius"	August 11, 2012
24	"Muslim conquest of the Levant"	August 12, 2012
25	"Umar and his subjects"	August 13, 2012
26	"Siege of Damascus"	August 14, 2012
27	"Battle of al-Qadisiyyah against Sassanids"	August 15, 2012
28	"Siege of Jerusalem"	August 16, 2012
29	"Famine Year"	August 17, 2012
30	"Plague, Death of Suhayl ibn Amr and Abu Ubayda ibn al-Jarrah, conquest of Egypt, Death of Khalid ibn al-Walid"	August 18, 2012
31	"Death of Umar ibn al-Khattab and Election of Uthman"	August 19, 2012

== Production ==
The project was started on 30 September 2010 through an agreement signed by Middle East Broadcasting Center and Qatar Media agency (Qatar TV) to make a drama series on the life of Caliph Omar, scheduled to be aired during the Ramadan of 2011. The chief of MBC group Waleed al Ibrahim stated that, the drama would not aim at profits:

The dramatic work is not regarded from the profit or loss perspectives.

— Waleed al Ibrahim, chief of MBC group

Saudi producers, the Middle East Broadcasting Center (MBC), said the series is the largest ever Arabic production, with 30,000 actors and a technical team from 10 countries who toiled 300 days to make the 31-part series. The director Ali said that building a replica of Mecca and the surrounding area was a challenge that faced him until he and the crew finally chose a location in Morocco. The series needed a huge crew amount to 500 actors, actresses, and extras in one single day. Ali also pointed out, several scenes in the series were difficult to shoot like which elephant treads on one of the actors.

The elephant was well-trained for the scene and we made the actor wear an iron shield just in case anything goes wrong.

— Hatem Ali, director

The horses used in the series were brought from Eastern Europe and were trained together with the elephants to make them adapt to each other. The series featured many battle scenes on a large scale. Ali said it took them a total of 54 days with a rate of 12 hours a day and with the participation of 500 extras that were trained on this type of scenes.

Two actors of this series, Hassan Al-Jundi and Muna Wassef, both acted (as Abu Jahl and Hind respectively) in the 1970s Arabic language film Al Risalah (الرسالة), the version of Moustapha Akkad's religious biopic The Message (a.k.a. Mohammad, Messenger of God) made for the Arab World. Hassan Al-Jundi also acted as Kisra in the English language film while his counterpart in Al Risalah played the character of Abu Jahl in the same film.

Hatem Ali commented that other filmmakers would follow in his footsteps with this taboo broken by him by portraying sensitive early Islamic personalities like Rashidun Caliphs, by pointing to Majid Majidi, who was then developing the feature film Muhammad: The Messenger of God about the Islamic prophet Muhammad's childhood.

=== Committee members for managing historical context ===
A board committee of scholars was created for maintaining the historicity of the script. The major members of the board were:

1. Yusuf al-Qaradawi
2. Akram Zia Omari
3. Salman al-Awda
4. Abdul Wahab Turairi
5. Ali al-Sallabi
6. Saad Al-Otaibi

=== Costume design ===
Azar Mohammadi designed the costumes for most of the episodes and led the full costume design process, including conducting historical research, selecting fabrics, and supervising production.

=== Visual effects ===
Most of the episodes of the series contained many expensive computer-generated imagery (CGI) effects which were supervised by Chadi abo and executed by French CGI production BUF in association with Hecat, as well as title and ending theme also. Moreover, the sets of ancient Mecca and Medina and other sites in Arabia and elsewhere in the post classical era were also produced by the Soora Studio, a Syrian set producer production, which previously made the sets of many other popular Arabic dramas.

=== Music ===
The original soundtrack was composed by Turkish musician Fahir Atakoglu. A nasheed or Arabic song praising Omar and describing a complete archive of the serial was featured after the scene of his assassination in the ending episode. The nasheed, entitled "Salamun Alayka Ya Omar Al Faarouq", was sung by the Kuwaiti Quran reciter Mishary Al-Afasy.

== Receptions from Islamic religious scholars ==
Saleh Al-Fawzan, Grand Mufti of Saudi Arabia (Abdul-Aziz ibn Abdullah Al Shaykh), Al-Azhar University, Abdul Azīz bin Fahd, Muhammad Al-Munajid, Abdullah bin Zayed Al Nahyan, Saleh al-Maghamsi and many other Islamic scholars viewed the series negatively.

The Grand Mufti of Saudi Arabia and the head of the Council of Senior Religious Scholars, Abdul-Aziz ibn Abdullah Al Shaykh, criminalized the dramatic action, saying that those behind "Umar Al Farooq" series have committed a "grave mistake and a crime" by spending their money on the production of such a TV series. He also said that he is against the idea of producing a series that "displays the biography of the rightly guided caliphs in a manner that is doomed to lead to offense and criticism." He added: "These films and series do not bring about or intend any good, and the producers, who claim intellectual enlightenment, might say, they are wrong in the path that they have taken, and they should know that what they offer is dangerous, wrong and a crime." Senior Saudi Salafi scholar Saleh Al-Fawzan also forbade watching the series, recalling "the consensus of scholars and the Muslim World League to prohibit the representation of the Companions, may God be pleased with them."

Salman al-Awda, Yūsuf al-Qaraḍawī, Yasir Qadhi, Alī al-Sallabī and Khaled al-Musleh viewed the series positively.

Indian Islamic preacher Zakir Naik gave a mixed review of the series. In a video on his official YouTube channel, he recommended Muslims not to watch any TV series or movies, but said that if they can't resist the habit completely, they should watch TV series like Omar and films like The Message. In reaction to Naik's view about the series, Saudi Salafi cleric Assim Al-Hakim said: "This is like saying masturbation is better than fornication! Or saying that drinking wine, gambling and other different sins are better than shirk or kufr! What kind of logic is this?".

== International broadcasting ==
The series later has been broadcast in the television channels of different countries such as Turkey, Indonesia, Kosovo, Iran, Tunisia, Egypt etc. either dubbed or with native subtitle.

Country	Network	Series premiere
Algeria	EPTV	July 20, 2012
Arab League	MBC1, Qatar TV	July 20, 2012
Indonesia	MNCTV	July 20, 2012
Kosovo	Klan Kosova, TV BESA	May, 2020
Tunisia	Nessma TV	July 20, 2012
Turkey	atv, Kanal 7	July 20, 2012; June 7, 2016
Lebanon	Future Television	September 23, 2013
Iran	Nour TV (UAE)	September, 2013
Morocco	Medi1TV	September, 2013
Uzbekistan	Milly TV	1 May 2018
United Kingdom	Islam Channel	24 June 2020
Maldives	Raajje TV	11 March 2021

== Traditional historicity and depictional issues ==
In the traditional Islamic accounts, there are two different stories found about the conversion of Umar, the story which has been depicted in the story, some scholars argue that the story is not authentic or reasonably weak according to reliable chain rather than declaring authenticity to the second story of conversion, where Omar became convinced to convert hearing the Quran recitation of Muhammad in prayer outside the Kaaba, then made himself hidden from the people for some days immediate after the conversion, and Al-As ibn Wa'il saved the converted Umar from the attack of enraged people. In the events of the Islamic prophet Muhammad's living era, Muhammad himself, his children and wives were not depicted but many direct actions of him have been shown redirected from any other sahaba near to him for the restrictions and limitations of Muhammad's visual depiction in the Islamic world. Although in a sequence before the death of Abu Bakr, there was a shadow depiction of Aisha shown silently conversing with her father. The dress code of male companions after conversion period was also controversial, mostly for wearing gowns below ankle, which was strongly prohibited by Muhammad, and tradition says that, all the companions always used to wear clothes over ankle. Besides, in the event of the battle of Yamama, the characters of the companions behind of Khalid bin Walid have been shown to give the slogan "ya Muhammada" (O, for Muhammad), which was a subject of controversy about historicity among some Salafi clerics. They argued that it could not be told by them because calling on any other except Allah is a form of polytheism (Shirk). Historical reference says that Umayyah ibn Khalaf was killed by a group of Muslims led by Bilal ibn Rabah, but in the series, Bilal ibn Rabah has been shown to kill Umayyah ibn Khalaf by himself. In a scene of Caliphate of Abu Baqr, the character of Abu Bakr is seen wearing a thawb spreading it's back on the ground which is haram in Islam.

As for the role of Omar is one of the first tools of the weakness of the work technically where the strange cold performance and the rigidity of features and divisions of his face, even with events that require a human interaction natural and unchanging.

The series also missed the historical role of the Arab tribes allied to Quraish in the invasion of one of them, including the Ahbish of Kenana, as well as the role of Arab tribes in the invasion of the trench and Taif so that the work was limited to the tribe of Quraish as well as the tribe of Ghutfan and absent from work tribes that had a presence in the historical biography of these conversations, such as the tribe of Selim and Kenana The Bani Asad tribe, the Hawazin tribe and other Arab tribes on which the Arab community of the Arabian Peninsula was built at that time.

According to the Sīrat, the Quraysh plan to assassinate the Prophet Muhammad before the Hijra, was delivered to the Qurayshi leaders by Iblis-Satan, in the guise of a man in a black robe. However, in the tenth episode Abu Jahal is seen delivering the plan. In all, content covering these topics may be seriously offensive to some Muslims.

== See also ==
- List of Islamic films
- Muhammad in film
- Muhammad: The Last Prophet
- The Message (1976 film)
- Muhammad: The Messenger of God
- Muhammad: The Final Legacy
- Salah Al-deen Al-Ayyobi
- Bab Al-Hara
- Bilal (film)
- Dirilis: Ertugrul
- Fetih 1453
- He Who Said No (film)
- Kuruluş: Osman
- Muhammad Al-Munajjid
- Mukhtarnameh
- Muhteşem Yüzyıl
- Prophet Joseph (TV series)
- Yunus Emre: Askin Yolculugu
- Muawiya (TV series)
- Muawiya, Hassan, and Hussein (TV series)
- Maslaha
- Bidah
- Jewel in the Palace
- Al-Jami al-Kamil
