= The Road to Mecca =

Road to Mecca may refer to:

- The Road to Mecca (book), a 1954 autobiography of Muslim scholar, intellectual, political theorist and diplomat Muhammad Asad
- The Road to Mecca (play), a 1984 play by South African author Athol Fugard
- The Road to Mecca (film), a 1991 film adaptation of Fugard’s play
- A Road to Mecca - The Journey of Muhammad Asad, a 2008 documentary on the life of Muhammad Asad, made by Austrian filmmaker Georg Misch

== See also ==
- One Thousand Roads to Mecca, a collection of travel journals edited by Michael Wolfe and published in 1999
