= Qamar Bani Hashim =

Qamar Bani Hashim may refer to:

- Abbas ibn Ali, also known as Qamar Bani Hashim, a son of Ali (the first Imam of Shia Islam)
- Muhammad: The Final Legacy, or Qamar Bani Hashim, a 2008 historical Arab drama series
