= The Imam (TV series) =

Arabic historical television series

- Promotional poster
- Also known as: The Imam Series
- الإمام
- Genre: Biography, drama, religion, history, serial
- Based on: Historical events on the life of Ahmad ibn Hanbal
- Written by: Mohammed Al - Yousari
- Directed by: Abdul Bari Abu al-Khair
- Starring: Mehyar Khaddour; Salloum Haddad
- Theme music composer: The Roussan weighs (the starting badge) Mohamed El-Hassian (end badge)
- Opening theme: From the poetry of Imam Shafei
- Ending theme: Abdulrahman Al Awadi
- Composers: Tariq al-Nasser, Dave Scott
- Country of origin: Arab World/Qatar
- Original language: Arabic
- No. of seasons: 1
- No. of episodes: 30

Production
- Executive producer: Qatar Media Foundation
- Producers: Al-Buraq Media Production Company, D&B Media
- Production locations: Lebanon, Turkey
- Running time: 50 minutes

Original release
- Network: Qatar TV
- Release: May 20 – June 25, 2017

Related
- Omar

The Imam series or Bin Hanbal series or Ahmed bin Hanbal series, is a historical television series produced by Qatar Media Foundation, which carried out the work in cooperation with Al-Buraq Qatari Media Production Company, For the Ramadan show (1438 AH / 2017 AD) with the participation of a large group of artists from seven Arab countries with more than 70 artists and representatives, and the implementation of the serial through documentation and dramatic treatment and film production and took the production of the series more than two years between 2015 and 2016, more than a full year.

The series tells the full biography of the four imams of the Muslims from the Sunnis and the community Ahmad ibn Hanbal and the events that took place from the beginning of his family and social life and even began his scientific life in the request of forensic science (isnad) from Muhammad and the Quran until his death, and also reviews the period of the rule of the Abbasid state, Islamic events and conquests, the emergence of the Mu'tazili and the emergence of the plight of the creation of the Quran, and Imam Ahmad bin Hanbal confronted them.

The series was executed and illustrated in Lebanon and Turkey and requires serial production to build complete decorations for the cities where the events of the series such as Makkah, Ammouriyah, Baghdad and battle sites fought by the Abbasid State. The producer launched an official website to introduce the series in four languages, including Arabic, English, In turn, the state-run Qatar Television broadcast it exclusively on its screen during Ramadan.

The series was scheduled to be ready for display during the month of Ramadan ( 1436 H / 2016 ), but the conditions of obtaining visas to Syrian representatives involved in the work prevented this, where the company intended to produce several countries for photography was the first Morocco and then Algeria, India, Uzbekistan and Spain, finally settling on Turkey and Lebanon, where the series was filmed between them after long periods of delay.

The series is directed by Abdel Bari Abul-Khair and composed by a group of Syrian and Arab actors, including the Syrian artist Mehyar Khaddour who embodied the figure of the Imam and the Syrian artist Salloum Haddad, The artist Jiana Eid, the body of the personality of the mother of Imam Ahmad, the artist Moon Khalaf, the artist Qassem Melho, the artist Muhannad Qutish, the artist Mohammed Khair Jarrah and the artist Marah Jabr, who embodied the role of the wife of Imam Ahmad, the artist Ruaa Yassin and other artists.

== Synopsis ==
Imam Ahmad ibn Hanbal (164-241 AH / 780-855 AD) was a jurist whose later students would codify the Hanbali school of Islamic jurisprudence. He was known for his strong knowledge and strong conservation, and was known for good morals such as patience, humility and tolerance. He was praised by many scholars, including Imam Shafi'i, and his book " Musnad " is one of the most famous and most modern books.

Ahmad ibn Hanbal was born in 164 AH in Baghdad and grew up orphan. Baghdad was the present day of the Islamic world, full of different types of knowledge and arts, and the family of Ahmad ibn Hanbal directed to seek knowledge, and in 179 AH began Ibn Hanbal heading to the Prophet's Hadith, He was asked in Baghdad at the time of his sheikh Hashim bin Bashir al-Wasiti until he died in 183 AH, he remained in Baghdad asking to talk until the year 186 AH, and then started his trips in the request to talk, and traveled to Iraq and Hijaz and Tihama and Yemen, and taken from many scientists and modernists, and when he reached forty years in the year 204 e sat down to update the advisory in Baghdad, the people were gathered on the studied erosion Numbering about five thousand.

Ibn Hanbal was known for his role in the dispute about Quranic createdness, that took place in the Abbasid era during the reign of the Caliph al-Ma'mun, and then al-Mu'tasim and al-Wathiq after him. The Caliphs believed that the Qur'an was an updated creature, Ibn Hanbal and other scholars disagreed, and Ibn Hanbal was tortured and tortured. Then he was taken out of prison and returned to modernity and teaching. When al-Mutawakkil took power, he ended the sedition completely. In the spring of the first year 241 AH, Ahmed bin Hanbal developed a disease and then died, and was seventy seven years old.

== Story and Events ==
The series revolves around a historical drama where the series discusses the biography of the life of Imam Ahmad bin Hanbal, the fourth of the four imams in the Sunnis and the group where the series reviews many of the events that took place in his life during the era of Abbasid state in the era of Caliph Harun al-Rashid The light on the city of Baghdad, the nature of social life and also monitor the poor class in which he lived Ahmed bin Hanbal, as well as the middle class, in addition to the focus on some of the Islamic conquests in the era of Harun al-Rashid and the emergence of Mu'tazila and the struggle of the Secretary and the safe to power, In the way of narration of events and facts, which highlights the first: the personal life of the Imam and the social environment in Baghdad and the second: the system of political governance that prevailed at that time and the third: some stories and novels and historical facts that were modern in the era of the Imam.

=== Personal and social aspect ===
The historical narrative of the series begins from the stage of Shababah and study and science and also evokes the environment in which Imam Ahmad lived in ( 179 AH ) in Baghdad, including severe suffering in the livelihood and living and poverty, which was, and also highlights his interest in literary poetry and seeking knowledge and strength in Arabic language and keenness On the acquisition of forensic science and his mother's interest in raising him and urged him to request the science of Hadith, and prevent him from work to devote to science, and then trips to seek knowledge to Kufa, Basra and Hijaz and meet with the elders of his time, also reviews the story of his emergence after the death of Imam Shafei.

The series includes dramatic details about his qualities, behavior, life, his marriage, the hardships he faced, the events he encountered, the people he influenced or were influenced by, his views, his knowledge and his companions, the story of his entering and leaving prison, his repeated intellectual conflicts and his discussions with the violators. And the series shows the imam's adherence to accuracy and follow -up and rejection of measurement only in necessity and avoid the opinion and had some justification, notably the control of the Mu'tazil and the multiplicity of difference and sedition pushed him to return to the origins of modernity and confirmation and the commitment of the approach of the Quran.

It also sheds light on Imam Ahmad's struggle with Al-Ma'mun and Al- Mu'tazalah in the matter of saying the creation of the Qur'an, which took place on Imam Ahmad, imprisonment and torture in the prisons of the Abbasid regime and subjecting him to house arrest and the anger of the sons of Abbas, Muhammad forbade the people from meeting with the people. Full, as well The series tells the journeys and travels carried out by the imam to Iraq and Hijaz and Tihama and Yemen, and took on many scientists and modernists science, also reviews the stage of reaching forty years in the year 204 AH where he sat for the speech and advisory opinion in Baghdad, and then continued to publish the flag until his death in the year 241 hijri.

=== The political side and the regime ===
The second part of the events of the series sheds light on the political aspect in the city of Baghdad during the reign of Harun al-Rashid and his conflict with the Barmakids and the position of the nation of the refusal of the Roman Emperor Nikephoros I to pay tribute and the message of Harun al-Rashid and also focus on some of the Islamic conquests in his time, the rise to power of al-Amin after the death of Harun al-Rashid and then the death of al-Ma'mun and the accession of al- Mu'tasim.

=== Dramatic aspect and historical facts ===
The third part is from some of the stories, novels and historical facts that were reintroduced in the era of Imam Ahmed, which were employed in the series drama, including, the story of the loss of the girls Fawz and Shahinaz for their father, the merchant who lost them in the markets of Baghdad and then reviewed the period of their marriage and meet each other, as well as the story of Faraj and his mother who They suffered from extreme poverty, and Faraj was a thief to earn a living, then he went on to work in the saddle industry and then his work with the Minister Harun al-Rashid al-Fadl ibn al-Rabee to convey the news of the city of Baghdad to the caliph was joined to the isolationist, and also reviews the story of Amer and his mother and his wife in the context of the troubled family and the differences between them.

== Production ==
Work began on the production of the series in effect from the beginning of the year 2015, according to the Qatar Foundation for Information, the series was designed for the Ramadan show 2016, but was postponed by a decision of Qatar TV, the official producer of the series, because the series and the team faced several difficulties and obstacles between the completion The series, which was scheduled to be filmed in seven different countries, and a huge production requires the construction of full decorations for the cities that took place the events of the series, such as Mecca and Amuriyah and Baghdad and sites of battles fought by the Abbasid state, and events and sites highlighted by the biography of Imam Ahmad bin Hanbal.

The series of Imam Muhammad al-Yousari, who rewrote the script and dialogue 4 times over the course of two full years before it began, over two years before it begins ، 3 Sharia sheikhs and specialists supervised the audit and review of historical events and facts, so that the narratives and events were correct. and supervised the audit and review of events and historical facts 3 wise and specialized sheikhs to be true novels and events, And was directed by the Syrian director Abdel Bari Abu al-Khair, and directed the battles Hossam Mohammed al-Hamad, and carried out the battles. The film was produced and funded by the Qatar Media Foundation, and the production of the company was made by Al-Buraq Productions and Media. It also carried out information services and photographic equipment for the Turkish company D & B MEDIA and the implementation of technical services for Al Maha for technical production, and supervised the production studios of the company (PRIME FOCUS WORLD) The series was officially launched on 27 May 2017 in Arabic. The series is scheduled to be dubbed in five languages, including Turkish and other languages. The series has been produced in three different countries, from Qatar, Kuwait and Syria.

=== Stoppage of work and difficulties ===
The Qatar Media Foundation announced on June 2, 2016, the suspension of filming the series temporarily and postponing it to the next Ramadan show ( 1438 H 2017 ) [55] in order to show the required level that was prepared for him. The executive director of Al-Buraq Mohammad Al-Enezi and producer of the work that the postponement Came from the management of Qatar TV because of the lack of equipment currently required to rise and start this great work and in order to the quality required for the series to show the level required to be planned, to be launched in Ramadan 2017.

It is worth mentioning that the series was subjected to a series of difficulties, the first of which some Syrian representatives apologized for participating in the series, including Qusay Khouli Ghassan Massoud and Rashid Assaf and Samer al-Masri was to lead the character of Harun al-Rashid but apologized for the role due to preoccupation with other works and also encountered difficulties in the places of photography and countries where the filming where the series was initially a large rejection of more than one country was The series is scheduled to be filmed in 7 different countries, but this was not possible for the team in most of the countries to be filmed, according to the site Haven that the production company had intended to portray the series in Morocco, but the team could not enter the city of Marrakesh, which led to the selection of Uzbekistan and Algeria as an alternative place and then Spain and India as a final destination. However, all these options did not succeed, The work is continuing to complete the filming in Turkey and Lebanon after long periods of postponement. The reason for the refusal of the countries to photograph them is due to the difficulty of obtaining visas for Syrian artists participating in the work, which led to a postponement of the show for one year. And finish it In 2017.

=== Photography ===
The producer chose to film the series in the Republic of Lebanon and the Republic of Turkey to launch the project of filming the series and the first choice was made on the two Turkish cities of Istanbul on the banks of the Bosphorus, which contains the historic palaces used in the battles carried out in the serial where there are two battles, the first between Harun al-Rashid and Najafur the first king of the Roman, And the second battle Ammor and the famous incident, which was the time after the cry of Muslim women and Mstasmh, which had appealed to the successor Mu'tasim Billah of the Roman and the second city Mardin, which sits on the foothills of southeastern Turkey, which has its ancient historical character, its two ancient houses and its paved roads in the Middle Ages. It is characterized by the existence of desert, sea, mountains and rivers, and is compatible with the nature of Baghdad where Imam Ahmad bin Hanbal lived in terms of its suburbs, plains, palms and architectural style, which is characterized by the nearby effects of construction Abbas and Umayyad in general.

== Actors and characters ==
- Mehyar Khaddour - Imam Ahmed Ibn Hanbal
- Salloum Haddad - Caliph Harun al-Rashid
- Kassem Melho - Ahmad ibn Abi Du'ad
- Akef Najm - Imam Al-Shafi‘i
- Najah Safkouni - Yahya ibn Khalid Al-Barmaki
- Gianna Eid - Umm Ahmed bin Hanbal
- Shadi Muqrasy -Badar Al-Kalai
- Mahmoud Khalili - Ahmad bin Nasir Al-Khuzaii
- Yousef Al-Maqbal - Thamamah bin Al-Ashras
- Hazem Zeidan - Suhaib
- Suhail Jabai - Yahya bin Muin
- Hamad Najm - Ishak bin Hanbal
- Tariq Abdo - Saleh bin Ahmad bin Hanbal
- Mohammed Mustafa - Ali bin Jaham Abu Al-Hasan
- Muhannad Qutaisy - Jafar Al-Barmaki
- Mostafa Saad El Din - Amr bin Amir
- Bassel Haidar - Ahmad bin Hani Al-Nishapuri
- Yazin Al-Said - Al-Wasiq Billah
- Malik Mohammed - Abu Bakar Al-Marwadhi
- Rana Gamool - Zumrudah
- Usamah Yousef
- Mirjana Maalouli - Shahinaz
- Robin Isa - Zubaidah binti Jafar
- Loris Kazaq - Salma
- Faten Shaheen - Abu Imam Al-Shafii
- Ahida Dib - Buthaina
- Amira Khattab - Ummu Khalid
- Kafah Al-Khus - Faraj
- Raja Yusuf - Umme Fara
- Hanan Al - Jabir
- Qamar Khalaf - Fawz
- Ghassan Azab - Masrur
- Adham Mursyad - Marwan
- Jamal Chousair - Fadli bin Sahl Al-Sarakhsi
- Mohammed Hamadah - Tharwan
- Ziad Touati - Mohammed bin Sarraj
- Ayham Majid Agha - Hanzalah
- Hamid Al-Dhab'an - Sufyan ibn ʽUyaynah
- Waseem Qazaq - Bahlul
- Fadi Al-Hamawi - Yahya bin Aktham
- Fahad Al-Sukkari
- Hamzah Abu Al-Khair
- Fadi Sabeeh - Abdullah Al-Mamun
- Khaled Al-Qish - Abu Abdullah Muhammad Al-Amin
- Ali Karim - Ibnu Mus'ab
- Jamal Al-Ali - Amir
- Fethi Haddaoui - Abu Abdullah Al-Armeni
- Nasser Wardani - Isa bin Jafar
- Muktasim Al-Nahar - Abu Fadli Jafar Al-Mutawakil
- Ahmed Mansour - Maruf Karkhi
- Tayseer Idris - Bishr Al-Marisi
- Mohamed Khair Al-Jarrah - Fadl bin Rabi'
- Pierre Dagher - Al-Muktasim Billah
- Marah Jabr - Abasa
- Ruaa Yassin - Hasan
- Nadirah Imran - Umme Amir
- Mazen Al-Jabbah

== List of official episodes ==
Episode number The main events of the episode Direct Source Original broadcast date The official view list is in chronological order

1. The imam looked for work and a tenant for his shop, and the loss of the two sisters from their father was a victory for Zumrudah " Episode 1 on Qatar TV " 27 May 2017
2. The father searched for the two lost girls, and the work of Amer the scaffold in the shop of Imam Ahmad " Episode 2 on Qatar TV " 28 May 2017
3. The adoption of the Caliph al-Rashid for science and scientists, and the determination of Imam Ahmed learning by Abu Yusuf " Episode 3 on Qatar TV " 29 May 2017
4. The death of Imam Malik and the grief of Imam Ahmad on him, Marwan asked to marry Shahinaz " Episode 4 on Qatar TV " 30 May 2017
5. The marriage of Shahinaz and the search for Hanzalah for the buyer to win, and the marriage of Amer, and the Imam's search for work " Episode 5 on Qatar TV " 31 May 2017
6. Shafi'i stood in front of the Caliph Harun al-Rashid in the matter of disagreement and out of the Caliph's order " Episode 6 on Qatar TV " 1 June 2017
7. Attempts of the enemies of the Imam to sell his shop, and the grief of the family of Imam Shafi'i on a bomb in Baghdad " Episode 7 on Qatar TV " 2 June 2017
8. Escalation of incitement to Baramka when Zubaydah wife of the Caliph, and the Caliph's tour to inspect the parish " Episode 8 on Qatar TV " 3 June 2017
9. The emergence of the Mu'tazila, the heresy and the emergence of the plight of the creation of the Qur'an and Imam Al-Shafei's response to it " Episode 9 on Qatar TV " 4 June 2017
10. The imam traveled to seek knowledge with Yazid ibn Harun, and Shahinaz continued to search for her sister's victory " Episode 10 on Qatar TV " 5 June 2017
11. Exit win from the house of Zmurda and sold to the Prince of the army and patron saint of service " Episode 11 on Qatar TV " 6 June 2017
12. Imam's journey to Hajj and seek knowledge in Mecca, and the message of Naqfour I to Harun al-Rashid " Episode 12 on Qatar TV " 7 June 2017
13. The continuation of Harun al-Rashid's war and the killing of Naqfur I and the victory of Muslims " Episode 13 on Qatar TV " 8 June 2017
14. The Secretary took power after the death of Harun al-Rashid " Episode 14 on Qatar TV " 9 June 2017
15. Ignite the spark of war between the Secretary and the safe and send armies to war and power struggle " Episode 15 on Qatar TV " 10 June 2017
16. To continue the war between the Secretary and the safe to power and kill the Secretary " Episode 16 on Qatar TV " 11 June 2017
17. The heresy and sedition and the arrogance of the Mu'tazili appeared in their religious beliefs in Baghdad " Episode 17 on Qatar TV " 12 June 2017
18. Mu'tazilah was killed by Usama al-Bakri Abu al-Abbas and the death of Imam al-Shafei " Episode 18 on Qatar TV " 13 June 2017
19. Questioning the caliph al - Ma'mun of Baghdad scientists from the Sunnis to say in the creation of the Koran " Episode 19 on Qatar TV " 14 June 2017
20. Calling Abu Musab to Baghdad scientists, including Imam Ahmad to say the creation of the Koran and the imprisonment of Imam Ahmad " Episode 20 on Qatar TV " 15 June 2017
21. The deportation of Imam Ahmad and with him the son of Noah to the prison of safe and on the road knows the news of the death of safe " Episode 21 on Qatar TV " 16 June 2017
22. Abu Abdul Rahman al-Marisi, the Imam of the Mu'tazilah, died " Episode 22 on Qatar TV " 17 June 2017
23. Imam Ahmad's argument and the Mu'tazidah in front of the Caliph Mu'tasim Bellah and the Imam's victory over them " Episode 23 on Qatar TV " 18 June 2017
24. The admiration of Mu'tasim al-Bilah is the steadfastness of the imam and his rejection of the sedition of the Mu'tazilah under the pretext and the imam's torture " Episode 24 on Qatar TV " 19 June 2017
25. The wife of the imam is sick with a severe disease and the grief of the imam and his son on it, and the commander killed your door Kharami " Episode 25 on Qatar TV " 20 June 2017
26. The development of events in Baghdad in the year 227 AH, and the death of Caliph Mu'tasim Billah and take over the trustworthy ruling " Episode 26 on Qatar TV " 21 June 2017
27. The meeting of Sunni scholars to put an end to the isolationist to stop heresies and misguidance, and to do good " Episode 27 on Qatar TV " 22 June 2017
28. Imam al - Khuzaie's debate and isolationism before the believer, and cut the head of Imam Khuzaie at the hands of the believer " Episode 28 on Qatar TV " 23 June 2017
29. A raid on the house of Imam Ahmad by order of Prince Abu Musab to search for the leader of the faithful " Episode 29 on Qatar TV " 24 June 2017
30. The expenditure of Imam Al-Attiyah, which was given to her by the poor and needy of the Ansar and immigrants " Episode 30 on Qatar TV " 25 June 2017
31. The illness of Imam Ahmad and his health is disrupted and then his death speaks the two testimonies " Episode 31 and Final on Qatar TV " 26 June 2017

== See also ==
- List of Islamic films
