= Beauty and the Dogs =

2017 film

- Film poster
- Directed by: Kaouther Ben Hania
- Written by: Kaouther Ben Hania
- Based on: Coupable d'avoir été violée by: Meriem Ben Mohamed; Ava Djamshidi
- Produced by: Mohamed Habib Attia; Nadim Cheikhrouha
- Cinematography: Johan Holmquist
- Edited by: Nadia Ben Rachid
- Music by: Amine Bouhafa
- Production companies: Cinétéléfilms; Tanit Films; Laika Film & Television; Film i Väst; Schortcut Films; Integral Film; Chimney
- Release dates: 19 May 2017 (Cannes); 18 October 2017 (France)
- Running time: 95 minutes
- Countries: Tunisia; France; Sweden; Lebanon; Norway
- Language: Arabic

Beauty and the Dogs (Arabic: على كف عفريت, romanized: ʿAlā kaff ʿifrīt, lit. 'In the Palm of a Devil') is a 2017 internationally co-produced drama film directed by Kaouther Ben Hania. It premiered in the Un Certain Regard section at the 2017 Cannes Film Festival. It was selected as the Tunisian entry for the Best Foreign Language Film at the 91st Academy Awards, but was not nominated.

== Plot ==
A young Tunisian woman is raped by police officers and seeks assistance in hospitals and police stations to register their crime while she is still under shock from the attack. She encounters indifference, hostility, bureaucratic impediments and some assistance from the various individuals that she interacts with. In the final scene, several police officers seek to intimidate the victim until one of the officers breaks from the group and encourages the victim to move ahead with her complaint. Based on a true story.

== Cast ==
- Mariam Al Ferjani as Mariam Chaouch
- Ghanem Zrelly as Youssef
- Noomen Hamda as Chedly
- Mohamed Akkari as Lamjed
- Chedly Arfaoui as Mounir
- Anissa Daoud as Faiza
- Mourad Gharsalli as Lassaad

== See also ==
- List of submissions to the 91st Academy Awards for Best Foreign Language Film
- List of Tunisian submissions for the Academy Award for Best Foreign Language Film
