= Karachi Kops =

British documentary TV show

- Genre: Documentary
- Directed by: Faris Kermani
- Country of origin: United Kingdom
- Original language: English
- No. of series: 1
- No. of episodes: 5

Production
- Running time: 30 minutes

Original release
- Network: Channel 4
- Release: 11 January – 8 February 1994

Karachi Kops was a British documentary series broadcast on Channel 4 from 11 January 1994 to 8 February 1994. The show focused on Pakistani police officers in Karachi.

The series aired on Link TV in the United States in 2002.
