= Mu'awiya, al-Hasan wa al-Husayn (TV series) =

Arab television series (2012)

- معاوية والحسن والحسين
- Genre: Biography, drama, religion, history, serial
- Based on: Mu'awiya ibn Abu Sufyan, Hasan ibn Ali and Husayn ibn Ali
- Written by: Muhammad al-Sayadi, Muhammad al-Hassayan
- Directed by: Abdul Bari Abu al-Khayr
- Starring: Rashid Assaf; Khaled al-Guwairy; Muhammad al-Majali; Fares al-Helou Hisham Henedi; Karim Mohsen
- Country of origin: Syria
- Original language: Arabic
- No. of seasons: 1
- No. of episodes: 30

Production
- Production locations: Saudi Arabia, Morocco
- Running time: 45 minutes
- Budget: 200 million SAR

Original release
- Network: Al-Hayat, Al-Tahrir, LBC, Rotana Egypt, Rotana Gulf, and Al-Nahar
- Release: July 20 – August 18, 2011

Related
- Ahmad bin Hanbal

Mu'awiya, al-Hasan wa al-Husayn (Arabic: معاوية والحسن والحسين, lit. 'Mu'awiya, Hasan and Husayn') is a 2011 Arab television drama series based on the lives of Hasan ibn Ali and Husayn Ibn Ali, the two grandsons of the Islamic prophet Muhammad, and their relationship with their companions and sedition that occurred between them and their companions after the killing of Uthman ibn Affan. It shows alleged Jewish conspiracies through the personality of Abdullah bin Saba, and his role in stirring sedition.

The series is a co-production among Qatari, Syrian, Kuwaiti, Moroccan and Jordanian elements. It deals with the epic strife that created a rift across the Islamic Ummah. The period extends from the beginning of the sedition, after the martyrdom of Caliph Uthman, through the assumption of Ali, the martyrdom of him and his son Hasan, and the concession of Hasan alongside the takeover by Muawiya. Husayn in Karbala deals with the serial events of the battle of the two sentences. The series caused a sensation when it objected to the issuance of many religious scholars and Shiites and was boycotted by the Iraqi government and banned from Iraqi channels.

== Cast ==
- Rashid Assaf: Muawiya bin Abi Sufyan.
- Khaled Al-Guwairy: Hassan ibn Ali.
- Mohammed al-Majali: Hussein ibn Ali.
- Fares Al-Helou: Abdullah ibn Saba.
- Taysir Idris: Malik al-Ashtar.
- Fathi al-Haddaoui: Hurqus ibn Zuhayr.
- Talhat Hamdi: Zubayr ibn al-Awwam.
- Zinati Holy: Adi bin Hatim.
- Riyad Wardiani: Talha bin Ubaidillah.
- Mohammed al-Qabbani: Amr ibn al-Aas.
- Jamil Brahman: Abdullah ibn Umar.
- Abdullah Bahman: Zaid bin Umar.
- Abdul Rahman Abu al-Qasim: Abu Hurayrah.
- Akif Najm: Ammar bin Yasir.
- Un-Known: Zainab bint Ali.
- Lina Hawarneh: Fatima bint Ali.
- Hisham Henedi: voice of Uthman ibn Affan.
- Karim Mohsen: voice of Ali ibn Abi Talib.
- Hicham Bahloul: Muslim ibn Aqil.
- Qasim Melho: Al-Hurr ibn Yazid al Tamimi.
- Yasser Abdul Latif: Najjashi.

== Islamic scholars' support ==
Al-Maha Company issued a fatwa concerning the permissibility of the depiction of the companions of the prophet Muhammad including Hassan and Hussain, signed by a group of scholars, including:

- Yusuf Al-Qaradawi
- Abdul Wahab bin Nasser Al-Turayri
- Khalid bin Abdullah Al-Musleh
- The Fatwa Sector, Ministry of Awqaf and Islamic Affairs - Kuwait

The Department of Ifta Ministry of Awqaf in the Syria officially approved the text of the series. The script was reviewed by scholars under the supervision of Sheikh Hassan Husseini. They include the following:

- Ali Al-Salabi.
- Mohammed Al-Barzanji.
- Mohammed Mahfil.
- Khalid Al-Ghaith.

== See also ==
- List of Islamic films
