= Mohamed Akkari =

Tunisian actor

- محمد العكاري
- Born: 1980; Tunis, Tunisia
- Died: April 28, 2017 (aged 36–37)
- Resting place: Mahdia Marine Cemetery
- Occupations: Actor, Radio personality

Mohamed Akkari (Arabic: محمد العكاري, born 1978 in Tunis - death April 28, 2017 in Mahdia) was a Tunisian actor and Radio personality. Mohamed Akkari died of a heart attack following surgery. He is buried in the Mahdia Marine Cemetery in the presence of a good number of actors and fans. Rabaa Essefi said that the last sequence of the Dawama soap opera filmed with Mohamed was carried out in Sfax a week before his death.

== Filmography ==
=== Films ===
- 2014 : Habass Kadheb (Liar Prison) de Nabil Barkati (short film)
- 2016 : Crash d'Alaaeddine et Bahaeddine Jlassi (short film)
- 2017 : Beauty and the Dogs by Kaouther Ben Hania

=== Television ===
- 2013 : Layem by Khaled Barsaoui : Karim
- 2014 : Naouret El Hawa (season 1) by Madih Belaïd : Fadhel
- 2014 : Maktoub (season 4) by Sami Fehri : Khaled
- 2015 : Plus belle la vie (season 11) by Didier Albert
- 2015 : Le Risque by Nasreddine Shili
- 2015 : Histoires tunisiennes by Nada Mezni Hafaiedh
- 2015-2016 : Nsibti Laaziza by Slaheddine Essid : Doctor Ahmed Ben Hassena
- 2017 : Dawama by Naim Ben Rhouma : Kamel Bahri
- 2017 : Awlad Moufida (season 3) by Sami Fehri

== Radio ==
- 2014 : Radio Réveil and Jawwek 9-12 in Radio IFM : Radio personality
- 2015 : Summertime in Radio Kelma : Radio personality
