= The Noon of the 10th Day =

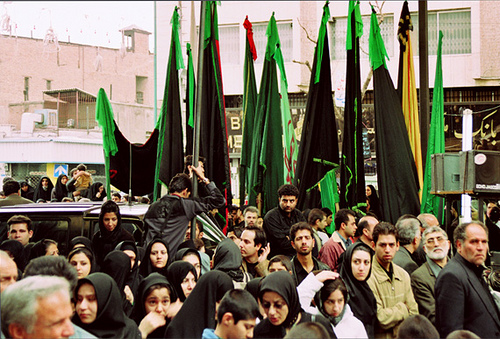
Ashoora is the day of traditional mourning for the death of the grandson of the Islamic prophet Muhammad at the Battle of Karbala on December 10, 680 AD

The Noon of the 10th Day is a 1988 documentary film by Mahmoud Shoolizadeh about people mourning in Ashoora in the city of Khansar in Isfahan province, Iran. In this ceremony, which takes place every year in the tenth day of Moharram by Shiite Muslims, the customs of the public mourning for the loss of their religious leader is shown. In this film, poetic and dramatic scenes from the Battle of Karbala is reconstructed.

This film participated in the Short Film Festival in Esfahan, Iran, in 1991.

== Technical specifications and film crew ==
- Betacam sp, 25 min. Documentary, Iran, 1988
- Script writer and Director: Mahmoud Shoolizadeh,
- Photographer: Mohammad Dodangeh
- Edit: Ali Tahvil Dari
- Producer: Javad Peyhani (I.R.I.B., Isfahan)

== See also ==
- List of Islamic films
