= Fahir Atakoğlu =

Turkish pianist and composer

Fahir Atakoglu
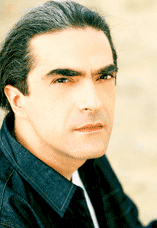
- Born: 28 January 1963 (age 63); Istanbul, Turkey
- Occupations: Composer, pianist
- Website: Official website

Fahir Atakoğlu (Turkish pronunciation: [faːˈhiɾ ˈatakoːɫu], born 28 January 1963) is a Turkish American pianist and composer who has worked with a wide range of artists across many genres of music, ranging in style from symphonic scoring to advertising jingles. He was born in Istanbul, Turkey.

== Early life ==
From the age of 7, Atakoğlu was interested in music and began playing piano and drums. Though his family intended for him to continue in the family business, his mother fostered his interest in music and through his music teacher Muzaffer Uz he was introduced to Cemal Reşit Rey, Turkey's famous composer, pianist, script writer, and conductor. Atakoğlu studied under Rey from 1977 to 1979. He attended the Istanbul State Conservatory from 1978 to 1980. In 1980 he moved to London and for five years studied at both the London School of Music and Croydon College. He earned a degree in marketing and advertising from Croydon College in 1983 and returned to Istanbul to work as a jingle composer in the advertising sector.

== Career ==
From 1987 to present, Atakoğlu has created music for commercials, news segments, and documentaries via advertising agencies including Lintas, McCann Erickson, CDP Europe, Young & Rubicam, Saatchi & Saatchi, and Ogilvy & Mather. Atakoğlu acknowledges that his training in ad jingles honed his skill as a composer to create immediate context within his music.

He has also composed music for Turkey's top bands and musicians, including Mazhar Fuat Özkan, Sezen Aksu, and Sertab Erener. He also composed music for Greek singer Notis Sfakianakis, whose CD-single "Telos Dihos Telos" - which included Atakoğlu's song of the same name- went 4× platinum with sales over 80,000 copies. Since 1994 Atakoğlu has recorded 10 albums which have sold over 2 million copies in 20 countries.

His 2005 album If is a collaboration featuring bass guitarist Anthony Jackson and percussionist Horacio "EI Negro" Hernandez.

In 2008, an album titled Istanbul in Blue was released in the United States. The album is a wide-ranging set that at first seems like jazz/rock fusion, but also includes the influences of Turkish music, some acoustic interludes, and sections that are completely unclassifiable. The album features Atakoğlu on keyboards, Anthony Jackson on bass, Horacio "El Negro" Hernandez on drums, Mike Stern and Wayne Krantz on guitars and Bob Franceschini on saxophone.

Atakoğlu's scoring includes the adaptation of Metin Kaçan's novel Ağır Roman (East Side Story) into a musical which was performed locally in Turkey as well as at Hollywood's Ford Amphitheater in August 2006 by the Istanbul State Opera and Ballet. He also composed the soundtracks of hit historical dramas such as Omar and Magnificent Century.

Atakoglu's 2020 album For Love is a collobration of different cultures and languages of 42 artists from 8 countries where lyrics are written for Atakoglu's compositions by international musicians. For Love secured seven first round ballots for 63rd Grammy Awards (2020) including Album Of The Year, Song Of The Year – “Por Amor ” feat. Buika, Best Jazz Instrumental Album.

== See also ==
- List of composers
- List of Turkey-related topics
