= Mahdia Marine Cemetery =

Cemetery in Tunisia

Mahdia Maritime Cemetery
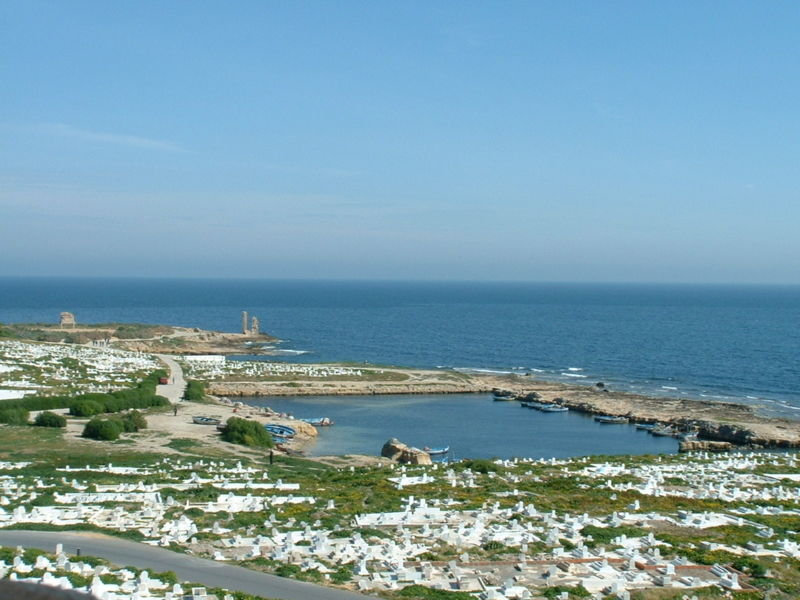
- View Mahdia Maritime Cemetery
- Interactive map of Mahdia Maritime Cemetery

Mahdia Maritime Cemetery in Tunisia is a burial site in the city of Mahdia where thousands of centuries-old tombs have been distributed without order. They are located between the Ottoman fortress of Bordj el Kebir and the old port of the city built by the Fatimids and supposedly used by the Phoenicians and Carthaginians on the rocks of Cape Africa, defended by a chain. In 1087 the Pisans and Genoese landed at this place.

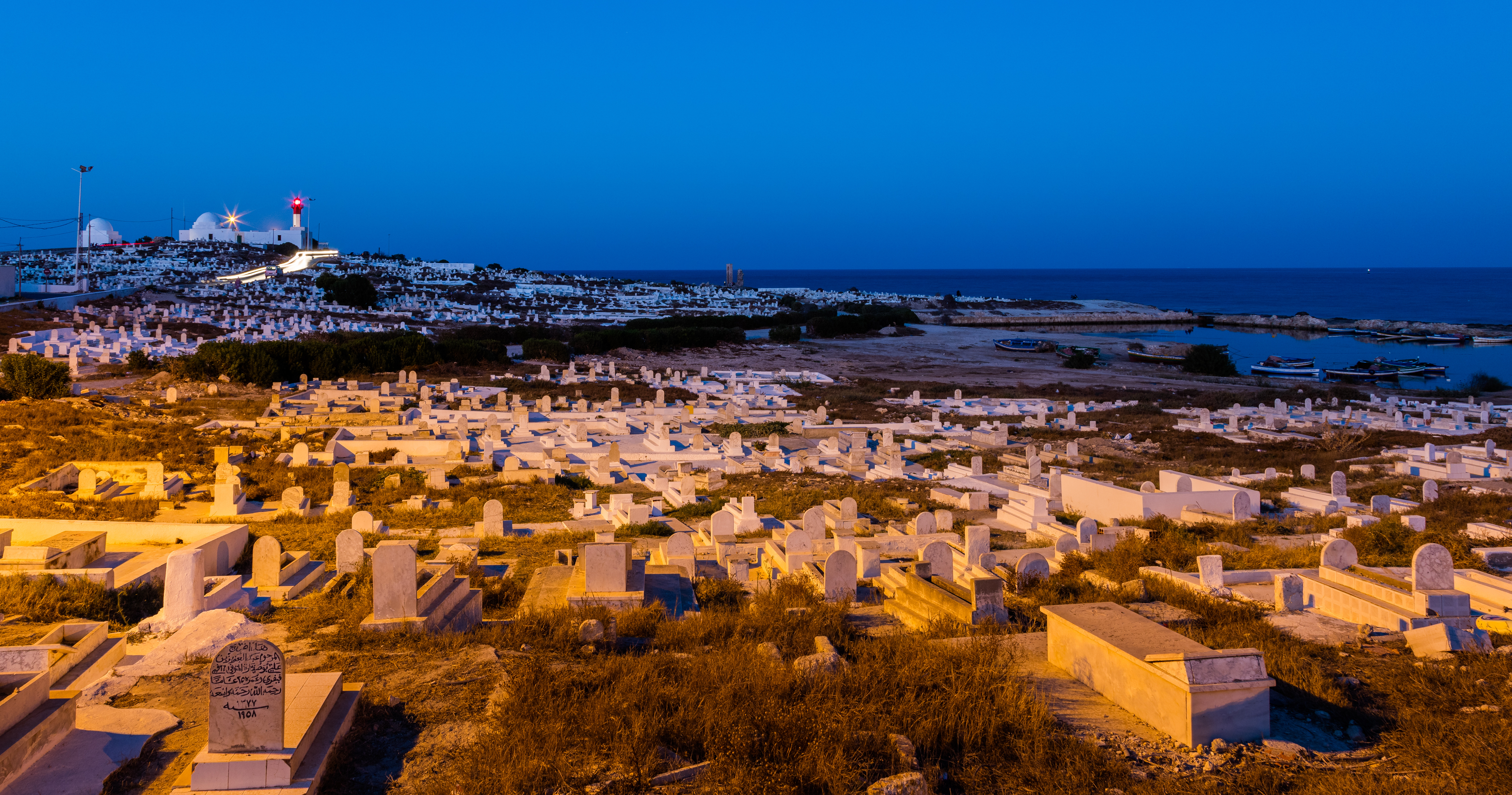
Mahdia Marine Cemetery night view

== Notable burials ==
- Mohamed Akkari, Tunisian actor
