= Nadia Ali (broadcaster) =

English television and radio presenter (born 1984)

- নাদিয়া আলী
- Born: 15 November 1984 (age 41); Ilford, London, England, UK
- Occupations: Television presenter, radio presenter, barrister
- Years active: 2005–present
- Organization: BBC Asian Network
- Spouse: Eazaz Ali

Nadia Ali (Bengali: নাদিয়া আলী; born 15 November 1984) is an English television and radio presenter of Bangladeshi descent. She is best known for presenting the Sunday evening show on BBC Asian Network.

== Background ==
Ali was born and brought up in Ilford in East London. She is of Bangladeshi descent and she comes from a Bengali Muslim family background.

== Career ==
In 2005, at the age of 20, Ali joined Channel S and worked there for six years on a children's live television programme. She has hosted award ceremonies and talent shows across the UK and Europe, including Channel S Awards 2011, British Bangladeshi Who's Who 2010 Awards, NTV Mega Concert and Yash Raj Films Aaja Nachle Competition. Ali has also worked for B4U, ATN Bangla and NTV.

In 2011, she co-hosted the first international reality television show in Bangladesh called Forgotten Roots, following the journey of 10 young adults from across the world in the search for their Forgotten roots, which was broadcast on the country's main television channel. In May 2012, Ali co-hosted Boishakhi Mela in Victoria Park, London. Since December 2012, she has presented the live Bengali music, entertainment and news show on Sunday evenings for BBC Asian Network. In 2013, the show won an award at the BBC Radio and Music Awards.

In July 2014, Ali featured in the fourth episode of short film series Ramadan Roundup, which was nominated for a national award at the Limelight Film Awards 2015.

In March–May 2015, Ali featured in two episode of comedy web series Corner Shop Show as Islah Abdur-Rahman's character's mother. In June 2015, she hosted the International Indian Film Academy Awards red carpet in Malaysia.

Ali also writes articles for an international magazine. She also works as a motivational speaker at local colleges and events. Alongside her media career, Ali was employed as a bank manager in 2008. Since then she graduated with in law and qualified as a barrister in 2012 and is currently a member of Lincoln's Inn. She is also a Director for the British Bangladesh Chamber of Women Entrepreneurs.

== Personal life ==
Nadia got married in 2017 to Eazaz Ali. She visits Bangladesh every year with her family.

== See also ==
- British Bangladeshi
- List of British Bangladeshis
