= Nour TV =

Persian language Sunni Islamic television channel

- Country: United Arab Emirates
- Headquarters: Dubai Media City

Programming
- Language: Persian

History
- Launched: 2010

Links
- Website: nourtv.net

Nour TV (Persian: شبكه جهانى نور) is a Persian language religious television channel. Operated from Dubai Media City in the United Arab Emirates, it offers mainly Sunni Islamic religious programs and documentaries, in contrast to the Shia Islam practised by the state of Iran. It also telecasts Persian dubbed Sunni religious dramas such as Omar and Salah Al-Din.
