= Ramadan Roundup =

- Genre: Religion/Comedy
- Created by: Ibrahim Rahman
- Written by: Ibrahim Rahman
- Directed by: Ibrahim Rahman
- Presented by: Ibrahim Rahman
- Starring: Ibrahim Rahman; Nadia Ali
- Voices of: Uzma Chaudhry
- Country of origin: United Kingdom
- No. of episodes: 4

Production
- Producer: Ibrahim Rahman
- Production locations: Cambridge/London, United Kingdom
- Editor: Ibrahim Rahman
- Running time: 5–15 minutes

Original release
- Network: YouTube
- Release: 2020 – 2020

Ramadan Roundup is a British web series by Ibrahim Rahman.

== Premise ==
The series shows Rahman sharing his own experiences of Ramadan, the ninth month of the Islamic calendar. He explores the concept of fasting and discusses various topics including family, education, charity and food. Rahman also raises awareness of the Cambridge Mosque Project, an ongoing initiative to build the city's first purpose-built mosque and Europe's first eco-mosque. The series has been uploaded on Rahman's YouTube channel.

== Reception ==
In May 2015, Ramadan Roundup 4 was nominated for the Limelight Film Awards – the largest set of independent awards for short film in the industry. It was shortlisted alongside three other entries under the Freefall category. Rahman was at Cambridge 105 for a live radio interview with Julian Clover on 105 Drive to talk about Ramadan Roundup 4‘s award nomination. In June 2015, Rahman was at Islam Channel to make a live TV guest appearance on Living the Life, a contemporary lifestyle magazine talk show. He talked about the series and was joined by fellow cast member Raza Amode. The day before the Limelight Film Awards 2015 took place, Rahman was at Cambridge 105 for a live radio interview with Phil Rowe on the Sunday Breakfast show, where they talked about the series and Ramadan Roundup 4′s award nomination.

== Awards and nominations ==
Year	Award	Category	Result
2015	Limelight Film Awards	Freefall Award	Nominated

== See also ==
- List of Islamic films
- Islamic humour
