= Muhammad: The Final Legacy =

Arab TV series

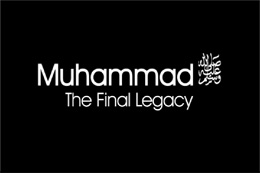
- Also known as: Qamar Bani Hashim (قمر بني هاشم)
- Genre: History, biography, drama, religious
- Developed by: Dr. Mahmoud Abd-al Karim
- Directed by: Mohammad Sheikh Najib
- Creative director: Najdat Anzour
- Starring: Rashid Assaf, Bassem Yakhour, Asaad Fedda, Najah Safkouney, Taisir Idris, Zuheir Ramadan
- Country of origin: Lebanon
- Original language: Arabic
- No. of episodes: 30

Production
- Producer: Media Link International
- Production locations: Lebanon, Syria, Jordan
- Running time: 43 minutes per episode

Original release
- Network: Lebanese Broadcasting Corporation
- Release: 1 September 2008

Muhammad: The Final Legacy or Qamar Bani Hashim is a 2008 historical Arab drama series directed by Mohammad Sheikh Najib, which aired on the Islam Channel. It is the first drama series which has depicted the life of Muhammad mostly maintaining the Islamic traditions and depictional restrictions. It was aired on the month of Ramadan in 2008 on the LBC network. The series portrays the full life of Muhammad (c. 570-632) without depicting him and his caliphs, wives and children according to Islamic tradition.

In 2010, it was aired in Kanal 7 of Turkey titling Hz. Muhammed'in Hayatı dubbed in Turkish and in Ramadan 2011, it was aired in Geo tv of Pakistan titled Muhammad (S.A.W.) Sayyed-e-Qaunain with Urdu dubbing. It was also released in Malaysia, as DVD with Malay subtitle.

== Cast ==
- Rashid Assaf as Hamza ibn Abdul-Muttalib
- Bassem Yakhour as Abdul-Muttalib
- Asaad Fedda as Umayyah ibn Khalaf
- Najah Safkouney as Abu Sufyan ibn Harb
- Taisir Idris as Abu Jahl ibn Hisham
- Zoheir Ramadan as Abu Lahab ibn Abdul-Muttalib
- Mahmoud Nasr as Zayd ibn Harithah
- Ali Karim as Utbah ibn Rabi'ah
- Yasir Abdullatif as Bilal ibn Rabah

== See also ==
- List of Islamic films
- Muhammad in film
- The Life of Muhammad
