= Saqf al-Alam =

Saqf al-Alam (Arabic: سقف العالم, lit. 'Roof of The World') was a Syrian television series that aired during the Ramadan season of 2007. The series tells the story of the Arab traveler Ahmad ibn Fadlan played by Qais al-Sheikh Najib, with reflections and references to modern issues arising between the west and the east, mainly terrorism and the clash of civilizations. The motivation for the series was the 2005 Jyllands-Posten Muhammad cartoons controversy in Denmark. It was directed by Najdat Anzour. The Syrian actress Dima Kandalaft took part in this series.

== See also ==
- List of Islamic films
