= Muawiya (TV series) =

- Genre: Historical, Biography
- Screenplay by: Muhammad Al-Yasari, Khaled Salah, Bashar Abbas
- Directed by: Ahmed Medhat
- Starring: Lojain Ismail; Wael Sharaf; Eyad Nassar; Ayman Zeidan; Samer Al-Masri; Souhir Ben Amara; Aïcha Ben Ahmed
- Country of origin: Saudi Arabia
- Original language: Arabic
- No. of seasons: 1
- No. of episodes: 30

Production
- Production location: Tunisia
- Running time: 45 Minutes
- Production company: Middle East Broadcasting Center
- Budget: $100 million

Original release
- Network: MBC TV
- Release: March 1, 2025

Related
- Omar (TV series)

Moawiya is a Saudi historical television series that began airing during the month of Ramadan in 2025. The series explores the life of Muawiya ibn Abi Sufyan, the founder of the Umayyad Caliphate in Damascus. It follows his journey from birth, through his rule in Damascus, until his death. The series also covers the caliphates of Abu Bakr, Umar, Uthman, Ali, and his son Hassan, all within the context of what is known in Islamic history as the "Great Fitna," the first civil war in Islamic history. In that context, The series examines the period following the assassination of Uthman, the third Rashidun Caliph, and the subsequent assumption of the caliphate by Ali. The narrative continues with the claim to the caliphate by Hassan, son of Ali, his relinquishment of power to Muawiya, and subsequent events, including the rise of Yazid ibn Muawiya, the second Umayyad Caliph.

Filming for the series began in July 2022, with a substantial budget of approximately $100 million, making it the largest production in the history of Arab television drama. The series was written by Muhammad Al-Yasari, Khaled Salah, and Bashar Abbas, the artistic direction by Ahmed Medhat, and produced by the MBC Studios in Saudi Arabia.

== Plot ==
Prophet Muhammad and his followers have started preaching in Mecca. Abu Sufyan ibn Harb, Amr ibn Hisham and Walid ibn Mughira try desperately to stop them, but fail to do so. Their opposition to Islam is further intensified when Abu Sufyan's own daughter, named Umm Habiba converts to Islam and flees to Abyssinia along with a small band of persecuted Muslims. The incident traumatises a young Muawiya. Prophet Muhammad and his followers migrate to Medina, where Umm Habiba joins them.

Years pass, and Muawiya is now a young adult. For the first time ever, he and his older brother Yazid ibn Abi Sufyan embark on a journey to the Levant with their father Abu Sufyan. There, the Byzantine Emperor Heraclius summons Abu Sufyan to his palace, to question him about Muhammad (S). Abu Sufyan narrates the Prophet's virtues, while Muawiya and Yazid listen. Muawiya's mind is bursting with confusion and when they leave the palace, he angrily questions his brother, saying that if Muhammad (S) was truly as virtuous as described Abi Sufyan, why did the latter object to the marriage of Muhammad and Umm Habiba?

While returning to Mecca, their caravan is halted by a scout, who tells them that the Prophet and his Companions are coming to loot their caravan. Abu Sufyan sends a messenger to Mecca, where Amr ibn Hisham (commonly known as Abu Jahl (lit. father of ignorance) due to his vicious opposition to the Prophet) gathers an army of one thousand to help the former. Abu Sufyan and his caravan escape by way of sea and arrive safely at Mecca, where they send yet another messenger to Abu Jahl, informing him of their escape and telling him to return. Abu Jahl, who is the most vicious of Muhammad (S)'s enemies, wants to kill the latter and end this threat once and for all, declines. After a bloody battle at Badr, Abu Jahl and seventy men are killed, among them Muawiya's brother Hanzala, maternal grandfather Utba ibn Rabi'a and uncle Walid. This is another trauma for Muawiya.

More years fly by, and by this time an adult Muawiya is convinced that Muhammad (S) is a true prophet. He secretly converts to Islam. As he prays, in the distance Muhammad and his army are seen approaching. Mecca is conquered by Muslims, and Abu Sufyan and Yazid also convert to Islam. Muawiya is appointed scribe of revelation by Muhammad (S). He marries in Medina, and has a daughter, Ramla and son, Abdurrahman. Some time later Muhammad (S) falls ill. He passes away after a short time. He is succeeded by Abu Bakr, who sends Muawiya and Yazid to Syria to fight the Romans. There, Muawiya participates in the battles of Yarmuk and Ajnadayn. Then the Muslims conquer Damascus, and after that Jerusalem. Muawiya is one of four witnesses of the treaty of Jerusalem, others being Yazid, Khalid ibn Walid and Abu Ubayda ibn al-Jarrah.

He is then tasked by Umar ibn Al-Khattab, the new Caliph, to take the city of Caesarea Maritima. During the siege of Caesarea, his son Abdurrahman dies from a head injury in Damascus, which he gets while playing with a dangerous horse. After staying for just one day in Damascus, Muawiya returns to Caesarea and by the use of catapults, he conquers it. After conquering Caesarea, he returns to Damascus. After some time, bubonic plague strikes the Levant, and Abu Ubayda, the Muslim First-in-Command in Syria, dies from it. Yazid is appointed Governor of the Levant, but some time later he also dies.

Muawiya is appointed Governor of the Levant. He presents the use of a Muslim Navy to Umar, asking for permission to build it, but Umar declines, fearing for Muslim deaths in the sea. Muawiya starts raiding Anatolia, the stronghold of the Byzantine Empire. After a few years, Umar is killed by a savage Persian slave, and Uthman ibn Affan, Muawiya's relative, is caliph. He grants Muawiya permission to build the Muslim Navy. Using it, Muawiya conquers Cyprus and Rhodes.

Rebellion is slowly rising against Uthman, and some time later rebels attack Uthman's house in Medina and murder Uthman. They then force Ali ibn Abi Talib to accept the caliphate, and Ali asks Muawiya to pledge allegiance to him. Muawiya declines, saying that first Ali should hand over the murderers of Uthman, then Muawiya would pledge allegiance. They fight at the Battle of Siffin, which ends in ceasefire. They agree that Muawiya will rule the Levant and Egypt, while Ali would rule the rest of the Rashidun Caliphate. Ali is murdered by a murderer of Uthman, and Ali's son Hasan makes Muawiya caliph, therefore marking the beginning of the Umayyad Caliphate.

== Episodes ==
No.	Title	Original release date
1	"The Family of Abu Sufyan and the Unrest in Mecca"	March 1, 2025
2	"The Early Days of Prophethood and Family Conflicts"	March 2, 2025
3	"The Hijra and the Rise of Islam's Strength"	March 3, 2025
4	"Conquest of Mecca and Mu'awiya's Conversion"	March 4, 2025
5	"The Martyrdom of Caliph Umar and Succession"	March 5, 2025
6	"Caliph Uthman's Inauguration and Damascus Governorship"	March 6, 2025
7	"The Muslim Navy and the Conquest of Cyprus"	March 7, 2025
8	"Expansion and Appointment of Relatives"	March 8, 2025
9	"Beginnings of Discontent and the Seeds of Strife"	March 9, 2025
10	"The Growing Rebellion and the Complaints Against Uthman"	March 10, 2025
11	"The Siege of the Caliph's House in Medina"	March 11, 2025
12	"The Martyrdom of Uthman and Mu'awiya's Vow of Revenge"	March 12, 2025
13	"Caliph Ali's Accession and the Demand for Retribution"	March 13, 2025
14	"Mu'awiya's Refusal to Pledge Allegiance (Bay'ah)"	March 14, 2025
15	"The Movement of Talha and Zubayr"	March 15, 2025
16	"Mobilization for the Battle of the Camel"	March 16, 2025
17	"The Battle of the Camel and Ali's Victory"	March 17, 2025
18	"Consolidating Ali's Rule in Kufa"	March 18, 2025
19	"The Journey to Siffin and Negotiation Attempts"	March 19, 2025
20	"The Battle of Siffin Begins (The Major Confrontation)"	March 20, 2025
21	"The Truce and the Raising of the Qur'an"	March 21, 2025
22	"The Arbitration Agreement (Tahkeem)"	March 22, 2025
23	"The Emergence and Rebellion of the Khawarij"	March 23, 2025
24	"Conflict with the Khawarij at Nahrawan"	March 24, 2025
25	"The Aftermath of Arbitration and Political Split"	March 25, 2025
26	"The Assassination and Martyrdom of Caliph Ali"	March 26, 2025
27	"Al-Hasan ibn Ali Takes the Caliphate"	March 27, 2025
28	"The Standoff Between Al-Hasan and Mu'awiya"	March 28, 2025
29	"Al-Hasan's Abdication and the Year of Unity ('Aam al-Jamā'ah)"	March 29, 2025
30	"Mu'awiya Establishes the Umaiyya Caliphate"	March 30, 2025

== Filming and cast ==
Filming took place in Tunisia, with many scenes shot in the studios of Hammamet (Cartago Film Studios), as well as other locations such as Kairouan (Great Mosque of Kairouan), Mahdia, Monastir, and Nabeul.

The series features a diverse cast of actors from Saudi Arabia, Syria, Tunisia, Egypt, and Jordan. Initially, Palestinian actor Ali Suliman was chosen to play Muawiya but was later replaced by Syrian actor Lojain Ismail. Reports suggest Suliman was dismissed due to his imperfect command of Arabic, which caused difficulties during the early stages of filming. Other notable cast members include:

- Jordanian actor Eyad Nassar as Ali
- Syrian actor Wael Sharaf as Amr ibn al-As
- Tunisian actress Souhir Ben Amara as Hind bint Utba, Muawiya's mother
- Tunisian actor Ghanem Zrelly as Yazid ibn Abi Sufyan, Muawiya's brother
- Tunisian actor Fadi Sabih as Abu Sufyan ibn Harb, Muawiya's father

Egyptian actors in the series are Asmaa Galal, Sawsan Badr, and Ahmed Bedeir, included in the cast.

Other Jordanian actors include Saba Mubarak and Eyad Nassar, both part of the series' ensemble.

In addition to Lojain Ismail and Wael Sharaf, The Syrian contingent comprises Ayman Zeidan, Samer Al-Masri, Yazan Khalil and Maysoun Abu Asaad.

From Saudi Arabia, the series features Rashid Al-Shamrani, Mohammed Bakhsh, Nizar Al-Sulaimani, and Abdulaziz Al-Sukairin, who are among the performers portraying this historical narrative.

Other than Souhir Ben Amara, The Tunisian actors were numerous, including Aisha Ben Ahmed, Jamila Chihi, Khaled Houissa, Mohammed Grayaa, Mourad Gharssali, Amir Dridi, Amira Darwish, Tarek Mannai, Khaled Hammam, Hakim Belkahla, Mohammed Mourad, Moncef Ajengui, Hadi Majri, Yassin Ben Gamra, and Abdelkader Ben Said.

== Reception ==
The series sparked widespread reaction in Arab circles even before its release, as it tackled an amazing historical topic expected to stir sectarian tensions. The Iraqi Media and Communications Commission prevented the series from being broadcast in Iraq, describing it as a controversial subject that could lead to "sectarian debates" among Iraqi Sunnis and Shiites during Ramadan. The commission requested that MBC Iraq, part of the Saudi MBC Group, refrain from airing the series, stating that it "contains material that offends the sentiments of the components of Iraqi society, including its religious and national groups." MBC Iraq complied, announcing that the series would not be part of its Ramadan lineup, while the MBC Group confirmed it would still air on other channels and the Shahid platform. This led to some confusion, with MBC issuing a statement denying that MBC Iraq had stopped to air the series.

Originally scheduled to air during the 2023 Ramadan season from 1 to 21 episodes.

The SATRA Monitoring and Supervision Deputy in Iran also prohibited the broadcast of "Muawiya" within the country.

== See also ==
- Mu'awiya, al-Hasan wa al-Husayn (TV series)
- Omar (TV series)
