= The Ottomans: Europe's Muslim Emperors =

2013 BBC documentary presented by Rageh Omaar

- Genre: Factual
- Directed by: Gillian Bancroft
- Presented by: Rageh Omaar
- Country of origin: United Kingdom
- Original language: English
- No. of series: 1
- No. of episodes: 3

Production
- Executive producer: Mile Smith
- Producer: Gillian Bancroft
- Running time: 59–60 mins

Original release
- Network: BBC Two
- Release: 6 October – 20 October 2013

The Ottomans: Europe's Muslim Emperors is a 2013 BBC Two documentary in three parts presented by Rageh Omaar. The series covers the origins of the Ottoman Empire; contrasts the empire under Suleiman the Magnificent with that of Abdul-Hamid II; and covers the demise of the Empire after the First World War.

== Episodes ==
No.	Title	Original release date	Viewers
1	"Episode 1"	6 October 2013	1,300,000
2	"Episode 2"	13 October 2013	1,000,000
3	"Episode 3"	20 October 2013	1,000,000

== See also ==
- List of Islamic films
