= À la découverte de l'Aïd al-Adha =

- Film poster
- Directed by: Farid Dms Debah
- Written by: Farid Dms Debah; Jonathan Aomar; Tarek Bara
- Produced by: Jonathan Aomar; Tarek Bara; Farid Dms Debah
- Starring: Farid Dms Debah; Tariq Ramadan; Nadia Yassine; Joe Regenstein
- Cinematography: Farid Dms Debah; Christophe Hourquet; Julien Pariente; Richard Sambron
- Music by: Pascal Cardeilhac
- Production company: TNJ
- Release date: September 2014 (France)
- Running time: 52 minutes
- Country: France
- Language: French

À la découverte de l'Aïd al-Adha (lit. "Let's discover Eid al-Adha") is a 2014 French documentary film directed by Farid Dms Debah.

== Cast ==
- Farid Dms Debah as host
- Tariq Ramadan as contributor
- Nadia Yassine as contributor
- Joe Regenstein as contributor
- Hany Mansour Al Mazeedi as contributor
- Florence Bergeaud-Blackler as contributor
- Mohamed Bouberka as contributor
- Chakil Omarjee as contributor
- Fethallah Otmani as contributor

== See also ==
- List of Islamic films
