= Ghanem Zrelly =

Tunisian actor

Ghanem Zrelli غانم الزرلي
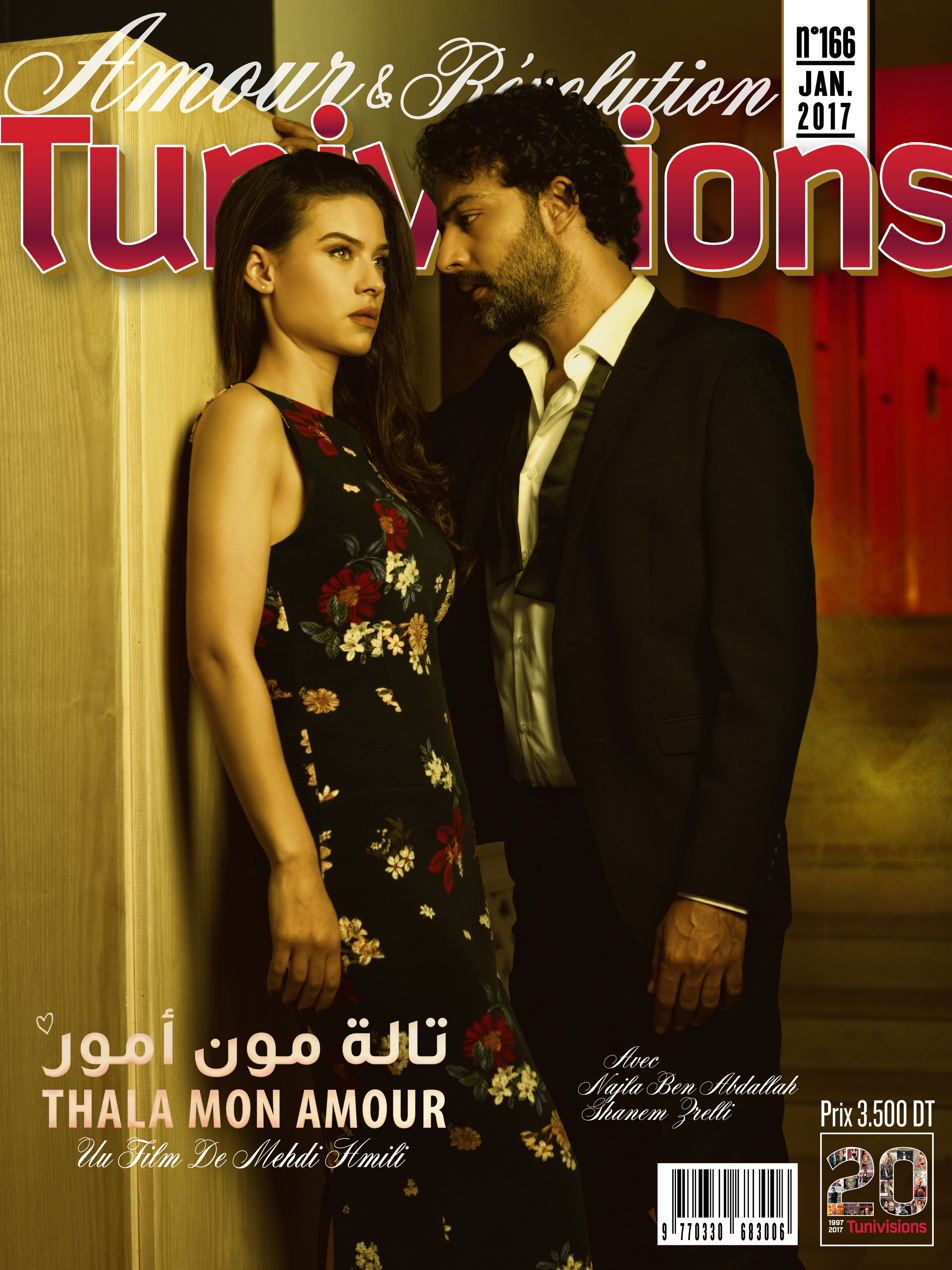
- Born: Mohammed Ghanem Zrelli; December 6, 1984 (age 41); Korba, Tunisia
- Occupation: Actor
- Years active: 2007–present
- Spouse: Alyssa Arabi
- Children: 1

Ghanem Zrelli (born 6 December 1984), is a Tunisian actor. He is best known for playing Muhammad in Thala My Love, Zamiri Gunman in Day of the Falcon, Ali ibn Abi Talib in Omar, Youssef in Beauty and the Dogs and Yousef in In Paradox.

== Career ==
In 2007, he made his film debut with the film Thirty. He played the supportive role of 'Habib Bourguiba'. In the next year, he made his television debut with the serial Njoum Ellil and played the role 'Qais'. In 2009, he graduated from the Institut Superieur d' Art Dramatique in Tunisia. In 2012, he played the role of Ali ibn Abi Talib in the controversial series Omar.

In 2016, he won the award for the Best Male Role for his role 'Mehdi' in the film Narcisse directed by Sonia Chamkhi during the fifth edition of the Maghrebian Film Festival organized in Oujda, Morocco.

In 2017, he starred in the critically acclaimed film Beauty and the Dogs where he played the lead role 'Youssef'. The film premieres in Cannes Film Festival in the 'Un Certain Regard' section.

In 2025, he played Yazid ibn Abi Sufyan in the 2025 MBC series, Muawiya (TV series). Zrelli was much acclaimed by the series's fans, who loved his portrayal. Though some wished he would play the role of Ali ibn Abi Talib in Muawiya series too, overall he was praised due to his great acting.

== Personal life ==
Zrelli is married to Alyssa Arabi, a Tunisian singer who participated in the Tunisian reality television music competition Tariq El Noujoum (برنامج طريق النجوم), hosted by Raouf Kouka, and later appeared on The X Factor. The couple are based in Abu Dhabi, United Arab Emirates, and they have one child.

== Filmography ==
Year	Film	Role	Genre	Ref.
2007	Thirty	Habib Bourguiba	Film	
2009	Njoum Ellil	Qais	TV series	
2011	Day of the Falcon	Zamiri Gunman	Film	
2012	Omar	Ali ibn Abi Talib	TV series	
2015	Narcissus	Mehdi	Film	
2016	Bolice	Stevie	TV series	
2016	Flashback	Slouma	TV series	
2016	Thala My Love	Mohamed	Film	
2017	Beauty and the Dogs	Youssef	Film	
2017	Aya	Aya's Father	Short film	
2019	El Maestro	Youness / Juvenile Officer	TV series	
2019	In Paradox	Yousef	Film	
2026	El Khottifa (The Swallow Bird, Arabic: الخطّيفة)	Khaled / Claude	TV serie	

== See also ==
- Tunivisions
