= Faris Kermani =

English film director

- Born: July 1963 (age 62); Harlow, Essex, England
- Occupation: Film director

Faris Kermani is an English film director of Pakistani descent. A graduate from the London Film School, his work consists primarily of documentaries but also includes drama series, and fiction films. Many of his programmes focus on South Asian politics and the Muslim world.

He has produced programmes for the BBC and Channel 4 as well as Pakistani channels. Releases include: The Life of Muhammad (BBC), Seven Wonders of the Muslim World, Karbala: City of Martyrs and Karachi Kops (all for Channel 4).

He now heads his own production company based in London, Crescent Films.

== Selected filmography ==
- Faiz: Poet in Troubled Times (1987, Channel 4)
- Baluchistan: The Gathering Storm (1987, Channel 4)
- Qawwali: The Sabri Brothers (1990, Channel 4)
- Northern Crescent (1991, Channel 4)
- The Dynasty (1996, BBC2)
- Karachi Kops (1994, Channel 4)
- Karbala: City of Martyrs (2004, Channel 4)
- Dispatches: Women Only Jihad (2006, Channel 4)
- Dispatches: Between the Mullahs and the Military (2007, Channel 4)
- The Seven Wonders of the Muslim World (2008, Channel 4)
- Revelations: Muslim and Looking for Love (2009, Channel 4)
- The Life of Muhammad (2011, BBC)
