= Race: Science's Last Taboo =

British television series

Race: Science's Last Taboo is a season of five British television programmes about race, broadcast on Channel 4 in 2009. In promotion of the series, Channel 4 doctored images of famous individuals, such as Margaret Thatcher, The Beatles, Usain Bolt and Barack Obama, to change their racial appearances.

== Programmes ==
Race and Intelligence: Science's Last Taboo
Journalist Rageh Omaar speaks with various scientists to discuss whether race and intelligence are linked.

Bleach, Nip, Tuck: The White Beauty Myth
A two-part episode that looks at the increasing trend for people to "de-racialise" their body through cosmetic surgery.

The Event: How Racist Are You?
A grade-school exercise called "Blue eyes/Brown eyes", devised by Jane Elliott in the 1960s, is recreated using members of the British public to draw attention to racism.

The Human Zoo: Science's Dirty Secret
A history of the human zoo, which were popular in the late 19th-early 20th centuries.

Is It Better to Be Mixed Race?
Aarathi Prasad looks at whether this is a genetic advantage to being mixed race.

== Controversy ==
"Race and Intelligence: Science's Last Taboo", the first episode of the series, caused controversy when scientists such as Richard Lynn and J. Philippe Rushton claimed in interview that Africans were less intelligent than white people and East-Asians a little more, with a mean I.Q above the white mean. The production of the programme had been inspired by similar comments made by the Nobel prize James Watson, who was advised not to participate.
