= Khorfakkan (2020 film) =

- Directed by: Ben Mole Maurice Sweeney
- Written by: Sultan bin Muhammad Al-Qasimi
- Starring: Rashid Assaf; Qays Sheikh Najib; Ahmed Al Jasmi; Khalifa Albahri
- Release date: 2020
- Country: United Arab Emirates

Khorfakkan is a 2020 historical film directed by Ben Mole and Maurice Sweeney that depicts the resistance of Khorfakkan against Portuguese invasion in the 16th century. The film is an adaptation of a book written by Sultan bin Muhammad Al-Qasimi, a member of the United Arab Emirates Federal Supreme Council and ruler of the Emirate of Sharjah.

== Plot ==
The movie portrays the events that took place during the Portuguese invasion of Khorfakkan in the early 1500s. It shows how the tribes of Khorfakkan city fought against Portuguese rule and their pursuit of freedom.

== Cast ==
- Rashid Assaf as Afonso de Albuquerque
- Qays Sheikh Najib
- Ahmed Al Jasmi
- Khalifa Albahri as Saeed
- Abdullah Almaqbali as Nasser
- Abdullah Bin Haider as Mohammed
- Abdulla Masoud as Commander 'Omar’
- Omar Almulla
- Dan Towse as Portuguese Arsonist
- Hassan Yousuf (actor) as Ahmed

== Production ==
The production of the movie began after the completion of a book about the resistance of Khorfakkan against the Portuguese invasion. Several historical elements were recreated for the movie, including Portuguese ships and buildings similar to those found in historic Khorfakkan.

== Reception ==
The movie has been well-received and is considered a milestone for the Emirati entertainment industry. It has been praised for shedding light on an important chapter in UAE’s history.

== Awards ==
Khorfakkan has won several awards from several Arab and international festivals, the most notable of which are:

- The Golden Award for Best Drama Feature Film from the Best Istanbul Film Festival in July 2022.
- The Best Historical Film Award from the Brussels Film Festival in July 2022.
- The Best Asian Film Award from the Athvikvaruni International Film Festival in India in June 2022.
- The Best Director Award for an Asian Film from the Athvikvaruni International Film Festival in India in June 2022.
- The Best Cinematography Award from the Athvikvaruni International Film Festival in India in June 2022.
