= Inside Islam =

- DVD cover
- Directed by: Mark Hufnail

Original release
- Release: September 4, 2002

Inside Islam is a History Channel documentary on the history of Islam and its modern day challenges including a crisis of authority and significant divisions among many of its sects. It depicts Islam as a peaceful religion, with several similarities to Judaism and Christianity, and argues that the primary reason that people fear Islam is due to fundamentalists. It also discusses Muhammad and his disagreements with his tribe who disapproved of his monotheistic religion, the Nation of Islam and the Arab–Israeli conflict. It first aired on 4 September 2002.

It is also played on Wealth TV.

== See also ==
- List of Islamic films
