= Rageh Omaar =

Somali-born journalist and writer

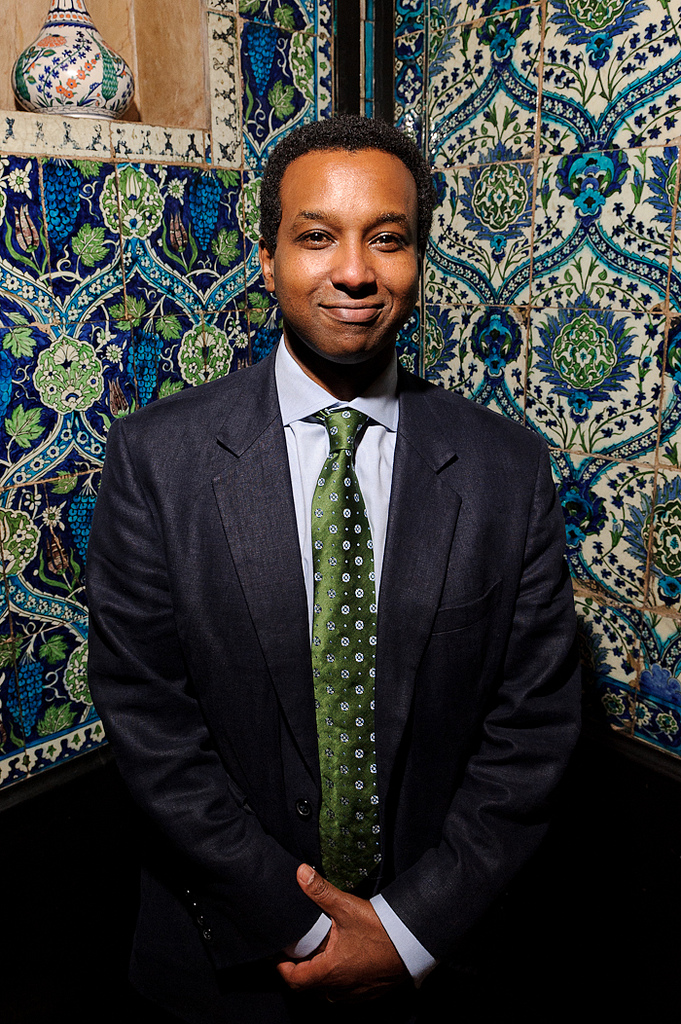
- Born: 19 July 1967 (age 59); Mogadishu, Somali Republic
- Education: New College, Oxford
- Occupations: Journalist, author
- Spouse: Georgiana Montgomery-Cuninghame (m. 2000)
- Children: 3
- Relatives: Mohamed Abdullahi Omaar (brother); Sir John Montgomery-Cuninghame, 12th Baronet (father-in-law)

Rageh Omaar (/ˈræɡi ˈoʊmɑːr/; Somali: Raage Oomaar; born 19 July 1967) is a Somali-born British journalist and writer. He was a BBC world affairs correspondent, where he made his name reporting from Iraq. In September 2006, he moved to a new post at Al Jazeera English, where he presented the nightly weekday documentary series Witness until January 2010. The Rageh Omaar Report, first aired in February 2010, is a one-hour, monthly investigative documentary in which he reports on international current affairs stories. From January 2013, he became a special correspondent and presenter for ITV News, reporting on a broad range of news stories, as well as producing special in-depth reports from around the UK and further afield. A year after his appointment, Omaar was promoted to international affairs editor for ITV News. Since October 2015, alongside his duties as international affairs editor, he has been a deputy newscaster of ITV News at Ten. Since September 2017, Omaar has occasionally presented the ITV Lunchtime News including the ITV News London Lunchtime Bulletin and the ITV Evening News.

== Early life ==
Omaar was born in 1967 in Mogadishu, Somali Republic, to Abdullahi and Sahra Omaar. His father was an accountant who became a businessman, a representative of Massey Ferguson tractors, and the founder of the country's first independent newspaper. He was also responsible for introducing Coca-Cola to Somalia. Omaar is a Muslim.

Omaar moved to the United Kingdom at the age of two. He has several siblings: his elder brother, Mohamed Abdullahi Omaar, was a former Foreign Minister of Somalia.

== Education ==
Omaar was educated at the Dragon School, Oxford, and Cheltenham College in Gloucestershire. He then studied Modern History at New College, Oxford.

== Journalism ==
=== General ===
Omaar began his journalistic career as a trainee for The Voice newspaper. In 1991, he moved to Yemen where he freelanced as a foreign correspondent, working mainly for the BBC World Service. A year later, Omaar returned to London to work as a producer and broadcast journalist for the British Broadcasting Corporation (BBC). He moved to UAE after having been appointed the BBC's Somaliland correspondent. Omaar's wife and children were based there through 2004, and his regular commuting made domestic life a challenge.

His career highlights include reporting live on the conflicts in Iraq.

=== BBC ===
Omaar covered the Iraq invasion for the weekday BBC News bulletins and the international BBC News channel. Many of his broadcasts were syndicated across the United States, where he became known as the "Scud Stud".

Omaar has written a book about his time as the BBC's Iraq correspondent called Revolution Day. The book deals with the effects of the Saddam Hussein regime, UN sanctions, and of the war on Iraqi civilians.

Explaining why he eventually left the BBC, Omaar suggested that he wanted to operate independently and to take on assignments for people he wished to collaborate with. He also suggested that the BBC working environment was somewhat exclusivist on a class basis, and that he was guilty of this as well to some degree as a consequence of his public school upbringing.

Additionally, Omaar has expressed regret about the way in which he covered the invasion of Iraq during his time as a BBC correspondent. He suggested that he and his colleagues did pieces on Saddam Hussein, his regime and weapons inspectors, giving little coverage to the Iraqi people. Interviewed in John Pilger's documentary The War You Don't See (2010), Omaar also lamented that "one didn't press the most uncomfortable buttons hard enough" and called the coverage "a giant echo chamber".

=== Al Jazeera ===
In September 2006, Omaar joined Al Jazeera English. He served as a Middle Eastern correspondent for its London division.

During his time with the news organisation, Omaar presented the nightly weekday documentary series Witness. He also hosted the monthly The Rageh Omaar Report, his own investigative documentaries.

=== ITV News ===
In January 2013, it was announced that Omaar would be joining ITV News as a special correspondent. He was promoted the following year to ITV News' International Affairs Editor.

Since October 2015, alongside his duties as international affairs editor, Omaar has been a deputy newscaster of ITV News at Ten.

Since September 2017, Omaar has occasionally presented the ITV Lunchtime News, including the ITV News London Lunchtime Bulletin, and the ITV Evening News.

== Awards and nominations ==
In 2003, Omaar was the recipient of an Ethnic Multicultural Media Academy award for the best TV journalist.

In 2008, he was also presented the Arab Media Watch Award for excellence in journalism.

In January 2014 and 2015, Omaar was nominated for the Services to Media award at the British Muslim Awards.

== Personal life ==
In 2000, Omaar married Alexander technique instructor Georgiana Rose "Nina" Montgomery-Cuninghame, the daughter of Sir John Montgomery-Cuninghame of Corsehill. The couple live in Chiswick, West London, and have two sons and a daughter.

Omaar maintains close contact with his family in Somalia, is an activist for the Somali community, and regularly attends its lectures and events.

Omaar became noticeably unwell during a live broadcast of the ITV News at Ten on 26 April 2024. ITV subsequently confirmed that he was 'receiving medical care'. Following the incident, Omaar's public career was paused. He returned to News at Ten, in a reporting capacity, on Monday 27 January 2025.

== Other works ==
=== Television ===
- An Islamic History of Europe, TV documentary for BBC Four : August 2005
- The Miracles of Jesus, TV documentary for BBC One : beginning on 6 August 2006
- The Dead Sea Scrolls. TV documentary BBC Four (February 2007)
- Rageh Inside Iran, TV documentary for BBC Four (Feb 2007)
- Islam in America, TV documentary for Al Jazeera English : October 2008
- Immigration: The Inconvenient Truth, a three part Channel 4 Dispatches documentary, on how immigration has affected Britain, using Enoch Powell's 1968 Rivers of Blood speech as a starting point (7 to 21 April 2008)
- The Vicar of Baghdad, TV documentary for ITV1 (2008)
- Pakistan's War. TV documentary for Al Jazeera English (Mid-Winter Production 2008/09)
- Iran Season, TV documentary for Al Jazeera English: January 2009
- Race and Intelligence: Science's last taboo. TV documentary for Channel 4 : October 2009.
- The Life of Muhammad. TV documentary for BBC 2. This is a three-part series, which had its first showing on 11 July 2011 on BBC Two from 9 p.m. to 10 p.m. The final edition of the series was on 25 July, on BBC 2 9 -10 pm. People on the programme included Karen Armstrong.
- Panorama - Ivory Wars: Out of Africa, TV current affairs documentary BBC1 : 12 April 2012
- The Ottomans: Europe's Muslim Emperors, BBC2, September 2013

=== Books ===
- Revolution Day: The Real Story of the Battle for Iraq, Penguin Books (2005), ISBN 0-14-101716-3
- Only Half of Me: Being a Muslim in Britain, Viking (2006), ISBN 0-670-91509-2

=== DVD ===
- The Ottomans: Europe's Muslim Emperors (region 2)

Media offices
Preceded by Nick Robinson	International Affairs Editor, ITV News; 2014–present	Succeeded by Incumbent
Preceded by Alastair Stewart	Deputy Newscaster, ITV News at Ten; 2015–present	Succeeded by Incumbent
