= The Life of Muhammad =

2011 British documentary miniseries

- Title card
- Genre: Documentary
- Written by: Ziauddin Sardar
- Directed by: Faris Kermani
- Presented by: Rageh Omaar
- Narrated by: Rageh Omaar
- Composer: Jez Spencer
- Country of origin: United Kingdom
- Original language: English
- No. of series: 1
- No. of episodes: 3 (list of episodes)

Production
- Executive producers: David Batty; Aaqil Ahmed
- Producer: Faris Kermani
- Production locations: Saudi Arabia; Syria; Turkey; Palestine; United States; United Kingdom; Jordan
- Cinematography: Philip Chavannes; Nasir Khan; Yousef Ibrahim; Andrew Psarianos
- Editor: Tim Arrowsmith
- Running time: 60 minutes
- Production company: Crescent Films

Original release
- Network: BBC Two
- Release: 11 July – 25 July 2011

The Life of Muhammad is a 2011 British three-part documentary miniseries examining the life of the Islamic prophet Muhammad and the origins of Islam. The documentary was directed by Faris Kermani, written by Ziauddin Sardar, and presented by Rageh Omaar. It was broadcast by BBC Two over three consecutive weeks from 11 July 2011 to 25 July 2011.

== Awards and nominations ==
Year	Award	Category	Recipient(s)	Result
2012	Sandford St. Martin Trust Awards	Television Premier Award	Crescent Films	Won
2012	Royal Television Society	Programme Awards	Crescent Films	Nominated

== See also ==
- List of Islamic films
- Muhammad in film
