= Bahlool =

Abbasid judge and scholar

Bahlool Dana
- بهلول
- Born: Abu Wahb Bahlool ibn Amr al-Sayrafi al-Kufi; 8th Century; Kufa, Abbasid Caliphate (present day Iraq)
- Died: 197 AH (812/813 AD); Baghdad, Abbasid Caliphate (present day Iraq)
- Burial place: Al-Shuniziyya Cemetery, Baghdad
- Occupations: Judge, Majzoob Saint
- Era: Islamic golden age
- Relatives: Harun al-Rashid.
- Family: List: Banu Hashim Branche:Abbasid Dynasty

Bahlūl (Arabic: بهلول) was the common name of Wāhab ibn Amr (Arabic: واهب ابن عمرو), a companion of Musa al-Kadhim. He lived in the time of the Caliph Hārūn al-Rashīd. Bahlūl was a well known judge and scholar who came from a wealthy background.

There are crazy but wise characters named Bahlul in Kurdish and Afghan cultures as well. Some Kurdish poetry has been attributed to the Kurdish Balül, known as Mahi Balül, and he is believed to be one of the Yarsanism sages. The Balul in the Afghan culture is believed to be contemporary to Mahmud of Ghazni.

The Name 'Bahlul' literally means a laughing man. Mehtar Nikoroi and the leader of the people and the collector of all charities, and in non-Arab cultural areas such as Tajik, it means a fool and a fool, and in North Africa it means a simple-minded person, and maybe it is the same with the word Hubali/Bohali. The meaning is confused. Ibn Arabi, by mentioning its plural form (Bahalil), considered the historical Bahlool as an example of a type of madmen who lose their "reasons" due to "ward" and fall into the category of divine admirers. Majlesi also used it as an adjective in the meaning of clever and brave.

== Becoming Bahlūl ==
There are interesting and humorous stories about him that depict a wise but crazy personality and indicate his qualities such as contentment, disregard for power, anti-tyranny, gentleness of soul, presence of mind and attention to detail. There are different sayings about his obvious characteristic, that is, his madness and his motivation; The most famous speech is Imam Musa Kazim's advice to him to declare insanity to save himself and escape from the harassment of the Abbasid caliph and to create an escape route so that he would not be in a position where he would have to approve the fatwa of killing the Imam or judgment in general. In this way, Bahloul's insanity was a form of taqiyyah with political motives. But in mystical texts, the insanity of Bahloul and others like him is due to the overwhelming intoxication of divine love and an involuntary thing that makes their communication with other people difficult and sometimes impossible, and their words It looks crazy The Caliph Hārūn al-Rashīd had begun a crackdown against the followers of the imprisoned Imam Musa al-Kadhim (as). Wāhab and a few others met the Imam (as) and sought advice. Mūsá replied with the Arabic letter ﺝ (jīm). Each of these companions took their own interpretation of the letter: jala'u l-waṭan "exile", jabl "refuge in the mountains" and for Wāhab, junūn "madness, possession by the jinn". The next day, Wāhab left his wealthy life, wearing rags and came into the streets. Baghdadis soon dubbed him Bahlūl.

Bahlool was born in Kufa and his real name is Wahab bin Amr. Hārūn al-Rashīd feared for the safety of his Khalifate and Empire from the 7th Imam Musa Al-Kadhim (as); therefore, he tried to destroy the Imam (as). Harun thought of a trick by which he could kill the Imam. He put the blame of rebellion upon the Imam (as) and demanded a judicial decree from the pious people of his time—which included Bahlool. Everyone gave the decree except Bahlool, who opposed the decision. He immediately went to the Imam (as) and informed him of the circumstances, and asked for advice and guidance. Then and there the Imam told him to act insanely.

Bahlool is traditionally believed to have acted eccentrically as per the Imam's order. According to tradition, this allowed him to avoid punishment from Hārūn al-Rashīd. In these accounts, Bahlool criticised the Khalifa and his courtiers without repercussions. Many of his stories still appear in oral and literary traditions today.

According to a more popular tradition, some of the Imam's companions and special friends came to him because the Khalifa was angry with them, and asked him for advice. The Imam answered with the sole letter (jim); all of them understood that that was it and asked no further questions.

Each person understood the Holy Imam's advice in his own different way. One person took (jim) to mean (jala'u l-waṭan) --exile. Another thought of (jabal) -- mountain. Bahlool took it to mean (junoon) -- insanity. This is how all of the Imam's companions were saved from calamity.

Before becoming insane, Bahlool lived a life of influence and power, but after obeying the Imam's order, he turned away from the majesty and splendor of the world. In reality, he became crazy. He dressed in rags, preferred desolate places over Haroun's palaces, and lived on a bite of stale bread. He did not accept favors from or depend on Haroun or those like him. Bahlool considered himself better than the Khalifa and his courtiers because of his way of life. Most of Bahloul's advice is about the last day: think about your end, that the world is transitory; however, the other world is hardly beautiful. This idea has led to the creation of a beautiful and mystical piece describing the world of the hereafter. A debate about forgiveness has the smell of Sufism. Some stories show his cleverness in world affairs.

Those with kingly temperaments deserve respect from
the chiefs of the kingdom.
This is a ragged king whose slaves are great and powerful
kings like Jamsheed and Khaqan.
Today he overlooked the goodness of this world, tomorrow
he will not even give importance to Paradise.
Don't look scornfully at these beggars with no shoes on their feet!
They are dearer to wisdom than eyes which shed tears from
fear of Allah.
If Adam sold Paradise for two grains of wheat, then truly know
that these people will not buy it for even one grain.

Bahlool was devoted to Allah; he was an intelligent and virtuous scholar. He was known for his sharp wit and courteous manner, and he often gave quick, thoughtful replies.; he protected his faith and the Shariah. Bahlool became insane at the Imam's command for the love of Ahl al-Bayt, and so he could enforce the rights of which they had been wronged.

There was no other way for Bahlool to protect his life. For example, Harun told his vizier, Yahya bin Khalid Barmaki, that listening to the words of Imam Jafar al-Sadiq (as)'s student Hisham bin Hakam—who proved Musa al-Kadhim (as)'s Imamate—was more dangerous to him than 100,000 swords. Harun said, "Even then it amazes me that Hisham is alive and I am in power."

Harun planned to kill Hisham. Hisham learned of this and fled from Kufa, and hid in a friend's house, but after a short while he died.

== Lineage ==
His full lineage is: Aba Wahb Bahlool ibn Amr ibn al-Mughira ibn al-Abbas ibn Muhammad ibn Ali ibn Abdallah ibn al-Abbas ibn Abd al-Muttalib ibn Hashim.

== Encounter with Harun al-Rashid ==
Al-Nishapuri, in his book Uqala' al-Majanin (The Wise Fools), recounts a famous encounter:

Harun al-Rashid was travelling for the Hajj pilgrimage when he passed the outskirts of Kufa. He saw Bahlool running, with a group of children chasing him. The Caliph said, "Who is this?" They replied, "Bahlool the Madman." Harun said, "I have always wished to see him. Summon him, but do not frighten him."

They called out to Bahlool, "The Commander of the Faithful summons you!" but he paid them no mind.

Harun al-Rashid himself then called out, "Peace be upon you, O Bahlool."

Bahlool replied, "And upon you be peace, O Commander of the Faithful."

Harun said, "I have longed to see you."

Bahlool retorted, "But I have never longed to see you!"

Harun said, "Advise me, Bahlool."

Bahlool replied, "With what shall I advise you? Look at their palaces... and look at their graves!"

Harun, impressed, said, "Advise me further, for you have spoken well."

Bahlool said, "O Commander of the Faithful, whoever is granted wealth and beauty by God, yet remains chaste in his beauty and generous with his wealth, will be written in the register of the righteous."

Harun, thinking Bahlool desired money, said, "We have ordered your debts to be paid."

Bahlool replied, "No, O Commander of the Faithful! A debt cannot be paid by incurring another debt. You must return what is rightfully owed to the people, and pay the debt of your own soul!"

Harun then said, "We have ordered that a stipend be issued to you."

Bahlool retorted, "O Commander of the Faithful, do you truly believe that God provides for you, but forgets me?"

He then turned and ran away.

== Poetry ==
Some of his attributed verses include:

O you who enjoys the world and its adornments, Whose eyes never sleep from its pleasures. You have busied yourself with what you cannot attain, What will you say to God when you meet Him?

He once said to Harun al-Rashid:

Suppose you have ruled the earth one day, And all people submitted to you, what of it? Will you not end up in a grave, while this one and that one Heap dust upon you?

=== On the Ahl al-Bayt ===
His poetry often reflected his deep devotion to the Ahl al-Bayt (the family of the Prophet Muhammad), which was the source of his political persecution.

If you truly love them, without falsehood, Then cling to your madness, in earnest and in jest. Beware lest they say you are rational and clever, For then you will be afflicted with long toil and hardship.

He also said:

I declare my innocence before God from any oppressor Of the grandson of the Prophet, Abu al-Qasim. I worship God through love for the Successor (Ali) And love for the Prophet, the father of Fatima. This is my protection from calamities And from every treacherous accuser. Through them, I hope for victory on the Day of Reckoning, And to be saved tomorrow from the blazing fire.

On the transient nature of the world:

O you who proposes to the world for yourself, Turn away from this proposal, and you will be safe. For the one you propose to is a deceiver, Whose wedding feast is very close to the funeral.

And on faith:

I have placed my trust in God, And I hope for nothing but God. Provision does not come from people; Rather, provision is from God.

== His Teachers ==
Bahlool was a transmitter of knowledge who narrated from scholars such as:

- Ja'far al-Sadiq
- Musa al-Kadhim
- Amr ibn Dinar
- Asim ibn Abi al-Najud
- Ayman ibn Na'il

== Death and Shrine ==
Bahlool died in Baghdad and was buried in the Al-Shuniziyya Cemetery, which is known today as the old Karkh cemetery. His shrine is a known historical site, located behind the shrine of Maruf al-Karkhi.

While some sources state his death was in 190 AH (805 AD), the historian Muhammad ibn Ishaq al-Nahwi al-Washsha, in his book Al-Fadil fi Sifat al-Adab al-Kamil (The Virtuous in the Craft of Perfect Literature), records the correct date as 197 AH (812/813 AD).

His shrine was restored and a dome was built over it by Kadhim Pasha in 1893 AD.

== In popular culture ==
- Bohlol Dana - A Sage of Baghdad is a 2010 Indian Hindi-language historical film about Bahlool directed by Abdul Qayyoom Khan.
- In 2017, Bahlul is played by Waseem Qazaq in The Imam.

== Sources ==
- Baghdad: Some of the Curious and Witty from its Witty Past - Ahmad al-Jazrawi - Baghdad - 2005 - Part IV / The Madmen of Baghdad - p. 126.
- A'yan al-Shia - Al-Amin: Vol. 3, pp. 617–623
- A'yan al-Shia - Al-Amin: Vol. 3, p. 618, citing Majalis al-Mu'minin.
- Fawat al-Wafayat - Al-Kutubi: Vol. 1, p. 228, Biography No. 84
- Al-Mustafad min Dhayl Tarikh Baghdad: Vol. 19, p. 91, Biography No. 60
- Al-Tabaqat al-Kubra - Al-Sha'rani: Vol. 1, p. 68, No. 138
- Al-Bidaya wa al-Nihaya: Vol. 10, p. 200
- Uqala' al-Majanin - Al-Nishapuri: p. 100.(2)
- Shajarat Tuba - Al-Ha'iri: Vol. 1, pp. 48–49 (Majlis 20)
