= A Road to Mecca - The Journey of Muhammad Asad =

A Road to Mecca – The Journey of Muhammad Asad
- Directed by: Georg Misch
- Screenplay by: Georg Misch, Miriam Ali de Unzaga
- Based on: The Road to Mecca
- Produced by: Ralph Wieser, Georg Misch
- Edited by: Marek Kralovsky
- Music by: Jim Howard
- Production company: Mischief Films
- Release date: 2008
- Running time: 92 minutes
- Country: Austria
- Language: English

A Road to Mecca – The Journey of Muhammad Asad, also known as A Road to Mecca, is a 2008 documentary by Austrian filmmaker Georg Misch. The documentary traces the path of Muslim scholar and political theorist Muhammad Asad, which led to his conversion to Islam.

== Synopsis ==
In the early 1920s Leopold Weiss, a Jew born in Lemberg, traveled to the Middle East. The desert fascinated him, and Islam became his new spiritual home. He left his Jewish roots behind, converted to Islam and changed his name to Muhammad Asad. He became one of the most important Muslims of the 20th century, first as an adviser at the royal court of Saudi Arabia, and later translating the Quran into English. Asad also played an important role in the creation of Pakistan and served as its envoy to the United Nations. The director follows his fading footsteps, leading from the Arabian desert to Ground Zero. He finds a man who was not looking for adventures but rather wanted to act as a mediator between East and West. “A Road To Mecca” takes this opportunity to deal with a heated debate which is currently becoming more and more important.

== Reception ==
The documentary received positive reviews from many magazines and newspapers e.g. Dox Magazine, Kleine Zeitung and Der Standard. Alissa Simon of Variety wrote:

"Informative... a well-judged combo of travelogue and biopic... a fine piece of anthropology, worthy of the dedication it copies from Asad's translation of the Koran: 'For people who think.'"

== Awards ==
The documentary was selected by the following film festivals, picking up a few awards:

- 2009 – Jerusalem Film Festival
- 2009 – Dubai Film Festival
- 2008 – FIDADOC Film Festival, Morocco (Jury Award)
- 2008 – Diagonale Festival of Austrian Films (Best Cinematography Award)
- 2008 – Hot Docs Canadian International Documentary Festival
- 2008 – Vancouver International Film Festival

== See also ==
- List of Islamic films
