= The Crusades, An Arab Perspective =

Documentary TV series

- Genre: Documentary
- Created by: Al Jazeera
- Original language: English
- No. of seasons: 1
- No. of episodes: 4

The Crusades: An Arab Perspective is a four-part series produced by Al Jazeera English, which first aired in December 2016. It presents the dramatic story of the medieval religious war through an Arab point of view. The series provides a new perspective on the history of the Crusades for a global, English-speaking audience, that has largely read about or studied the famous struggle from a primarily Christian and Western point of view. The series is heavily influenced by the 1984 book The Crusades Through Arab Eyes, by Amin Maalouf.

The series starts with the Catholic Church council in Clermont in France in 1095, under Pope Urban II, and continues to the fall of Acre, the last Crusader foothold in the east, in 1291, covering two centuries of bloody battles, massacres, and conquering and reconquering of territories, including Jerusalem. The story also involves many famous names – Saladin, Richard I of England, Frederick II and Louis IX.

== Episodes ==
Following is the complete list of episodes:

Episode	Title	Episode Description	First Aired
1	Shock	the first episode, explores the reasons behind the start of the Crusades, centered on Jerusalem, the holy city for Christians, Jews and Muslims. The Islamic empire of the last is largely divided into the Sunni Abbasid Caliphate on the east and the Shiite Fatimid Caliphate in the west. When the Fatimids try to stage a coup in Baghdad, the Seljuk Turks come to the rescue of the Abbasid Caliphate. Tughril Bey becomes the first ethnic Turk to take effective control of the Abbasid Caliphate. At the Battle of Manzikert (1071), Romanos IV Diogenes is taken prisoner. An Arab-speaking interviewee calls Pope Gregory VII the "Holy Satan" for his design to take over the Church of the Holy Sepulchre in Jerusalem. The figure of "Nairouz" (Firouz) is blamed for having betrayed the Muslims during the Siege of Antioch.	7 Dec 2016
2	Revival	the second episode, tells the story of the early Muslim resistance to the Crusades, led by the Zengids, a Turkic dynasty ruling the northern Levant. Al-Harawy meets with Caliph Al-Mustazhir to highlight the Caliph's inaction since the Levant has been taken over by the Crusaders. To his disappointment, the Caliph can't do anything because real power is in the hands of the Seljuk commanders. Around 1100, Radwan was the Seljuk ruler of Aleppo. al-Khashshab preached jihad against the Crusaders near Aleppo. Mawdud and Toghtekin join forces at the Battle of al-Sannabra (1113). In 1144, Imad al-Din Zengi undertakes the Siege of Edessa.	14 Dec 2016
3	Unification	the third episode, looks at how the famous sultan, Saladin, united Muslims across Egypt. In 1164, Nur al-Din Zengi, the Muslim leader of Aleppo and Damascus, and Amalric, King of Jerusalem both set their sights on Egypt. Saladin takes over for the 20-year-old Caliph al-Adid in Egypt. Instead of declaring himself a Caliph in the west after dismantling the Fatimid Caliphate, Saladin pledges fealty to the Arab caliph Al-Mustadi of Abbasid Caliphate in the east in Baghdad. When Nur al-Din dies in the Levant, his teenage son As-Salih Ismail becomes the ruling prince of Damascus, Aleppo, and Mosul. The year 1174 was critical because the Kingdom of Jerusalem was ruled by the 13-year-old boy-king Baldwin IV of Jerusalem and the Levant was in the hands of the 17-year-old boy-king As-Salih Ismail. With regards to the Kingdom of Jerusalem, Saladin signed a 10-year truce with Raymond III, the regent of Baldwin IV. Raynald set out to take over Mecca and exhume Muhammad's body in the Hijaz; eventually, he was captured and killed years later at the Battle of Hattin (1187). According to varying legends, the bad news of the fall of Jerusalem may have killed either Pope Urban III or Pope Gregory VIII. In response, the three great kings of Europe, King Philip II of France, King Richard I of England and Emperor Frederick Barbarossa led the Third Crusade (1189–1192). The Crusaders prevailed in the Siege of Acre (1189–1191).	21 Dec 2016
4	Liberation	the fourth episode, examines how the Mamluk Sultans of Egypt brought about the eventual destruction of the remaining Crusader states in the east. After Saladin's death in 1193, the Crusaders realize that the base of operations of their nemesis is Egypt; therefore, they attack the Nile Delta. When Pope Innocent III organized the Fourth Crusade, the Crusaders head to Constantinople because the Doge of Venice charged them less to take them to Constantinople by sea. In June 1218, the Fifth Crusade brings the Crusaders to Damietta. Frederick II, Holy Roman Emperor didn't want to listen to the Pope's plea to go on a Crusade in Egypt and re-take Jerusalem. The nephew of Saladin Al-Kamil signed a peace treaty with Frederick II. Eventually, the Pope declared a Crusade against the Hohenstaufen. Al-Kamil and Frederick II achieve peace In August 1248, Louis IX of France resolves to go on the Seventh Crusade in Egypt; in 1249, he's leading the Siege of Damietta (1249). His rationale was that Jerusalem was under the control of the Ayyubids in Egypt. The Mamaleks were Turkish slaves from Central Asia who had overthrown the Ayyubids. In 1258, Hulagu overthrew the Abbasid Caliphate and sacked its capital Baghdad. In September 1260, Qutuz is the only Muslim leader waving the banner of Islam in the absence of a caliph. Qutuz defeated the advancing Mongols at the Battle of Ain Jalut. Baibars was fully dedicated to jihad which gained him respect and legitimacy. However, like Saladin, Baybars wasn't Arab. Saladin was a Kurd and Baybars was a Turk (Mamluk). In April 1289, Qalawun, the new Muslim Turish Sultan based in Egypt, set out to conquer the County of Tripoli from the Crusaders. The son of Qalawun, Khalil, swore to his father that he would defeat the Crusaders in Acre which he carried out at the Siege of Acre (1291). In December 1917, Edmund Alleby takes control of Jerusalem.	28 Dec 2016
