= Rashid Assaf =

Syrian actor (born 1958)

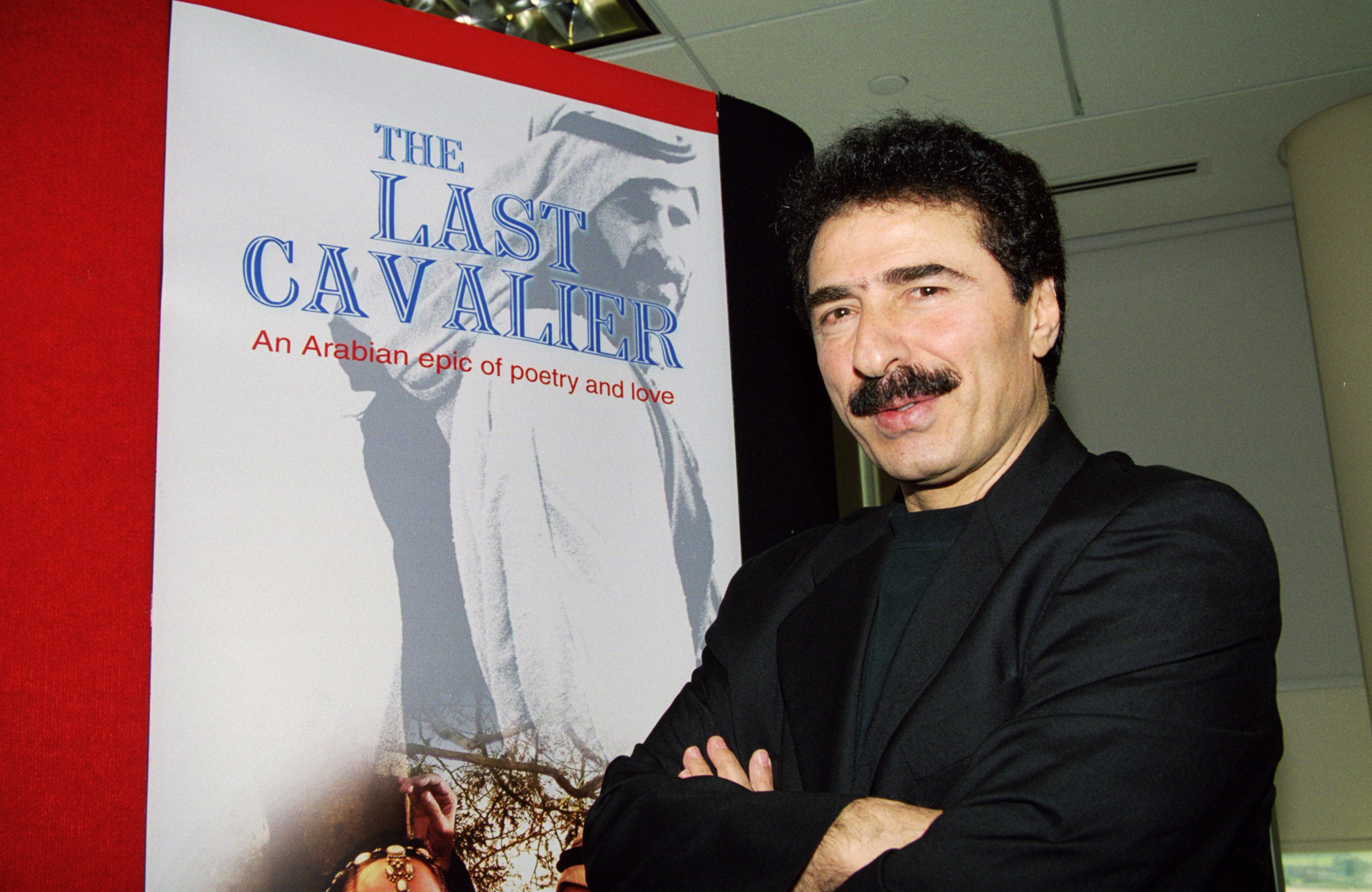
Rashid Assaf

Rashid Assaf (born August 13, 1958) is a Syrian actor with many cinematic, theatrical and television works.

== Career ==
His true breakthrough came in the early 1980s when director Salim Sabry cast him in the lead role in the series Al-Basta' (The Simple) written by Khairy Alzahaby. Since then, he has appeared in a number of popular series, including "Da'irat Al-Nar" (The Circle of Fire), "Al-Burkan" (The Volcano), and "Al-Ababeed." He also excelled in historical fantasy works such as "Al-Fawaris" (The Knights), "Al-Kawaser" (The Predators), "Sira' Al-Ashaws" (The Conflict of the Brave), and "Al-Masloub" (The Robbers), in addition to his prominent roles in historical series such as "Al-Bahth 'an Saladin" (The Search for Saladin), "Abna' Al-Rashid" (The Sons of Al-Rashid), and "Mamalik Al-Nar" (Kingdoms of Fire). In Bedouin drama, his name is associated with the role of "Ghalis" in the two-part series "Ra's Ghalis" (The Heads), which achieved widespread acclaim.

On the cinematic front, he has had distinguished appearances, including his participation in the film "Al-Hudood" (The Borders) (1984) alongside Duraid Lahham, and the film "Amatar Sayfiya" (Summer Rains) in the same year. He also played a prominent role in the film "Khorfakkan" (2020), portraying General Alfonso.
