= My.Kali =

Pan-Arab LGBT magazine published in English and Arabic

- My Kali September–October 2017 relaunch issue, following a year of being censored.
- Editor: Khalid Abdel-Hadi
- Categories: Conceptual visuals, social, LGBT+, gender, music, arts
- Frequency: Bi-monthly
- Founded: 29 September 2007; 18 years ago
- Country: Middle East & North Africa
- Based in: Amman, Jordan
- Language: English, Arabic
- Website: https://wp.mykalimag.com

My Kali (Arabic: ماي كالي) is an online pan-Arab LGBT magazine, published in Amman, Jordan in English since 2007 and in Arabic since 2016. It is named after its publisher, openly gay Jordanian model and activist Khalid "Kali" Abdel-Hadi.

== History ==
My Kali was the first LGBTQIA-inclusive online publication in Middle East. The magazine was established in late 2007 by a group of students, including Khalid Abdel-Hadi, who was 17 at the time, with various interests ranging from design and arts to politics. The online magazine sought to address homophobia and transphobia and to empower Arab youth to defy gender-binary institutions and traditions.

The first edition contained twelve articles, written by four of Abdel-Hadi's friends. Abdel-Hadi was photographed shirtless for the first issue's cover image, and was subsequently outed after local media reported on the magazine's release. However, the negative attention for the press also increased readership to 4,000 readers a day; some of the most popular articles would reach 50,000 readers.

My Kali was noted for its role in the 2011 controversy surrounding Khalaf Yousef, a Muslim cleric in Jordan who publicly came out as gay on his YouTube channel. After coming out, Yousef was fired, disowned by his family, and began receiving death threats. This caused him to flee to Lebanon and then to Canada, where he received asylum. Yousef explained later that he was inspired to come out after seeing a copy of My Kali.

In May 2016, My Kali began publishing an Arabic edition. Abdel-Hadi explained, "I want the publication to be reached by all, and not feel like it's excluding anyone". The publication of the Arabic edition increased interest in the magazine, which in turn led to the Jordanian government blocking access to the website following a complaint by parliamentarian Dima Tahboub. My Kali resumed publication in September 2017. By 2018, the magazine had more than 100,000 monthly readers.

As of 2019, the magazine's team numbered around 30 people located around the world, who communicated over Skype.

== Content ==
My Kali covers a variety of content, including interviews with gay and lesbian individuals and those seeking gender affirming surgeries, and photoshoots with gender non-conforming individuals. The magazine has also spoken with feminists, artists, designers, and musicians.

The magazine regularly features non-LGBT artists on its covers to promote acceptance among other communities and was the first publication to give many underground and regional artists—including Yasmine Hamdan, Haig Papazian and Hamed Sinno of Mashrou' Leila, Alaa Wardi, Zahed Sultan—their first cover stories. In addition to artists such as Jwan Yosef, Mykki Blanco, Habibitch and many more. The magazine has also dedicated a digital painting/cover of deceased activist Sarah Hegazi.

== See also ==
- LGBT rights in Jordan
