= Alireza Shojaian =

Iranian painter (born 1988)

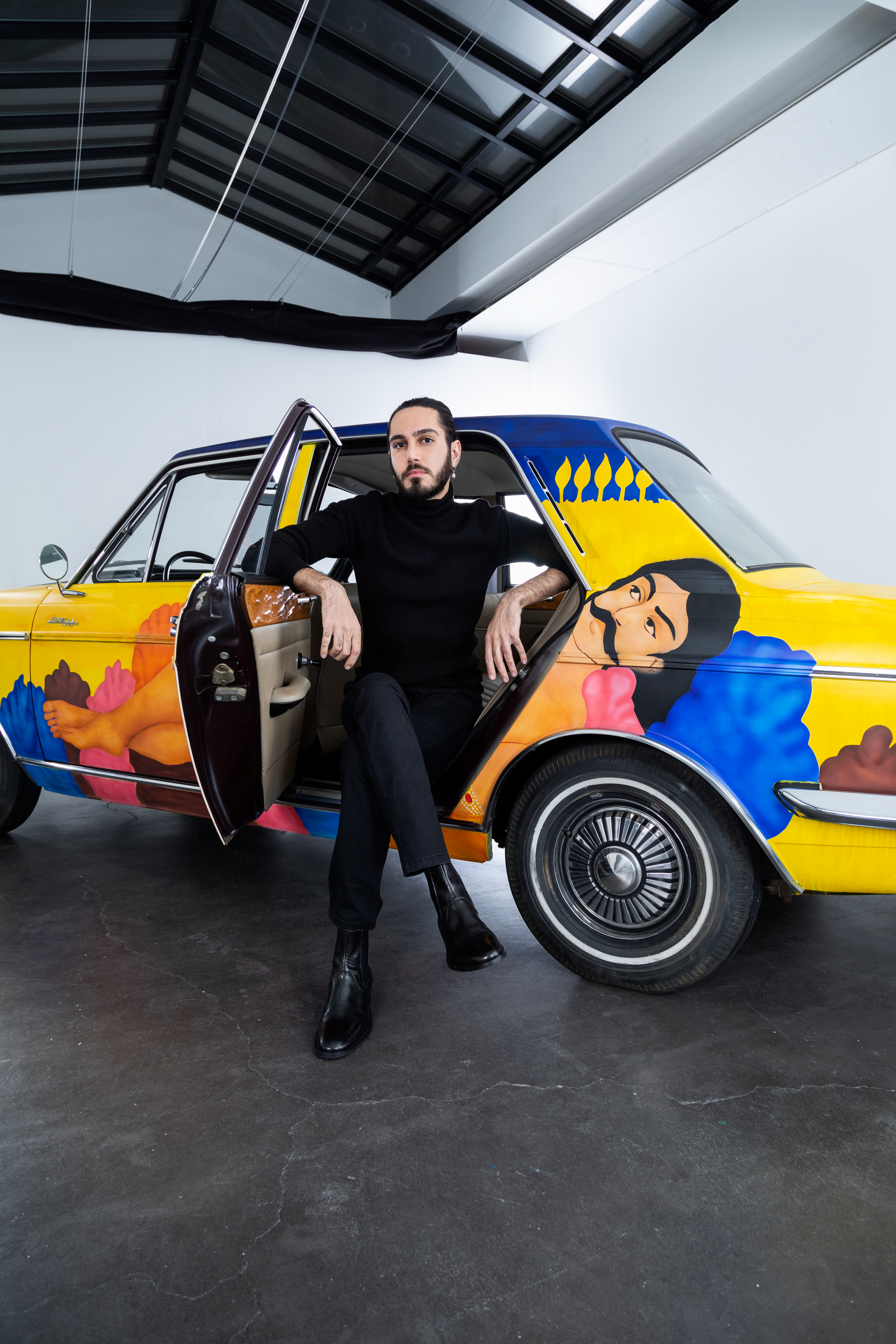
- Shojaian's PaykanArtCar
- Born: 1988 (age 37–38); Tehran, Iran
- Other name: Ali Reza Shojaian
- Education: Islamic Azad University
- Known for: Painting
- Works: Hamed Sinno et un de ses fréres, Sweet blasphemy series
- Movement: Queer art
- Website: www.alirezashojaian.com

Alireza Shojaian (Persian: علیرضا شجاعيان; born 1988) is an Iranian-born painter, visual artist and LGBTQ activist, based in France.

== Early life and education ==
Shojaian was born in Tehran to a Muslim family; he began to draw at an early age. At the age of 16 he was exposed to nude art for the first time when he saw Velasquez' Venus at her Mirror in an art magazine that was obtained in the Iranian black market. Unlike all other bareskinned images and paintings in magazines circulating in Iran, the nude body of Venus was not covered over by censoring black ink. Shojaian's reproduction of Velasquez' work was his first canvas painting. At the age of 23, Shojaian came out as gay to his university professor, who was sympathetic and encouraged him not to censor himself; her intervention enabled Shojaian to explore his sexual identity through his work and to document LGBT persons' experience in Iran.

Shojaian obtained his bachelor's degree in fine arts and painting from the Islamic Azad University in 2014. He was not allowed to complete his master's degree on account of his having chosen Queer Art as the subject of his thesis and final project. Shojaian kept his work hidden throughout his university years and did not exhibit in Iran.

== Exile and Paris ==
The sanctions against Iran prevented Shojaian from moving to the United States and Europe; he met a Lebanese patron in Iran who encouraged him to move to Beirut. Shojaian settled in the more liberal Beirut in February 2017, whereupon he was able to develop his work and held two solo exhibitions in 2017 and 2018. Shojaian was invited by the French embassy in Lebanon to participate in a project for the Académie des beaux-arts, following which he moved to Paris.

In 2019, after three years in exile living in Beirut, he was granted asylum in France.

== Sociopolitical activism ==
Shojaian depicts his subjects nude or semi-nude in intimate and vulnerable positions. He states that his work aims to fight societal prejudice against LGBT people while making space for non-heteronormative masculine identities. Shojaian has stated that sexual identity is politicized in a number of countries, including Iran, where human bodies are censored and controlled, and sexual identity is scrutinized and politicized. Shojaian did not feel safe in Iran, where un-closeted gay persons suffer from state-sponsored oppression and face execution.

== Work ==
=== Salad season series ===
While still in the university, Shojaian painted two nude works titled Salad season 1 and 2, where he alludes to self-inflicted genital mutilation as a symbol of not accepting his sexual identity under the oppressive Iranian regime. The paintings were not allowed in public, and were veiled for the private viewing of his university professor.

=== Hexagon Series ===
The Hexagon Series explores the final moments of one of Shojaian's friends who was murdered by a Jihadi stranger, posing as a sex date.

=== Sweet Blasphemy ===
In 2017, after traveling to Lebanon, Shojaian collaborated with Lebanese queer bellydancer and artist Khansa in a series of sensual and controversial nude portraits exhibited in Beirut under the title of Sweet Blasphemy.

=== Hamed Sinno et un de ses fréres (2018) ===
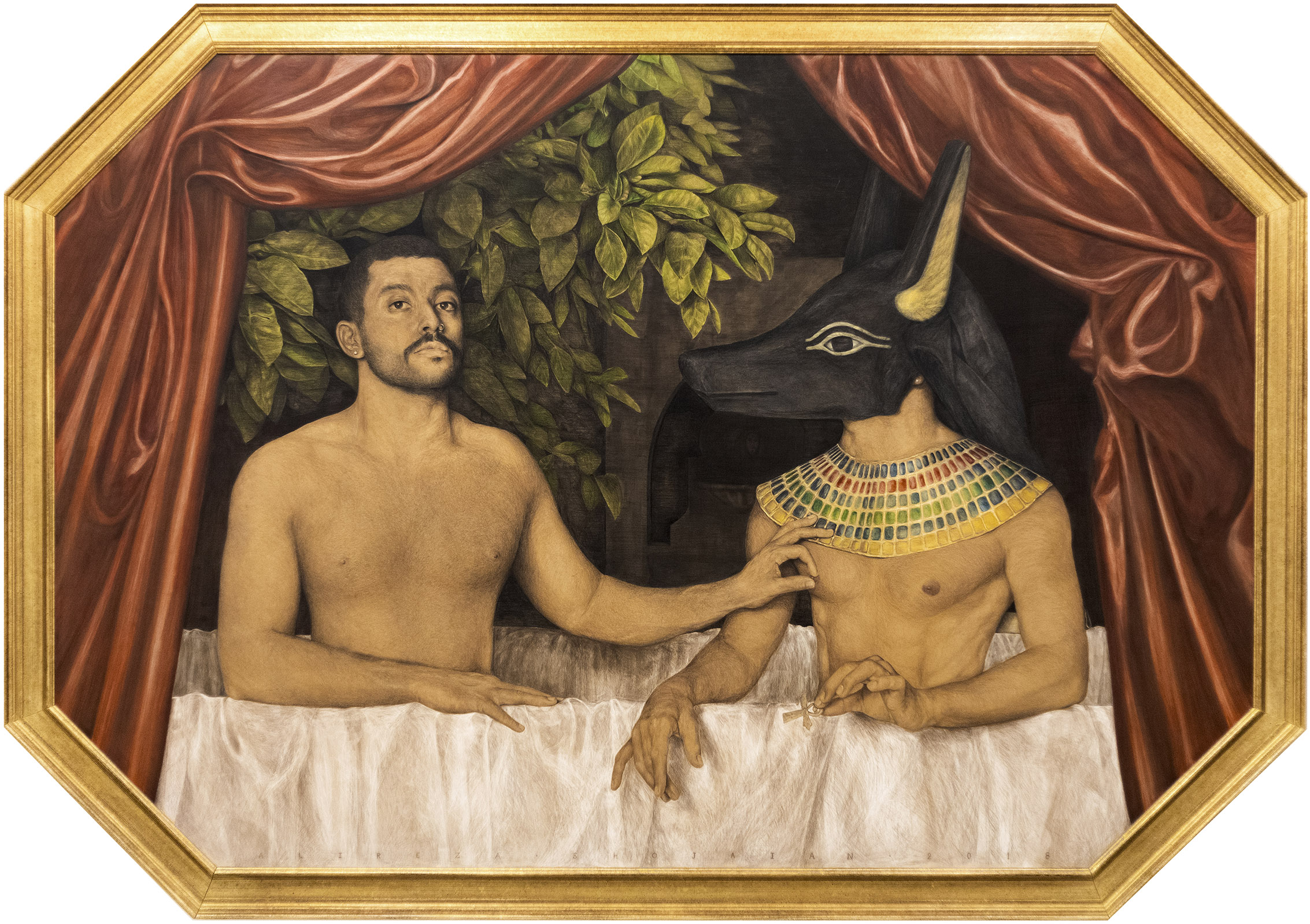
Hamed Sinno et un de ses fréres, 2018.

One of Shojaian's better known pieces depicts the band Mashrou' Leila's frontman Hamed Sinno pinching the nipple of Anubis, the ancient Egyptian god of funerary rites. In the painting, Anubis wears a rainbow colored Usekh collar, its design alluding to the pride flag.

This work references and draws inspiration from a work by an unknown painter, titled Gabrielle d'Estrées et une de ses sœurs, that depicts the mistress of Henry IV of France. The collaboration with Sinno was a statement against systematic state-led persecution of LGBT minorities in Egypt. Shojaian painted the piece after the September 22, 2017 Mashrou' Leila concert in Cairo, during which the pride flag was flown. The incident resulted in the arrest of a number of concert-goers. In a 2020 interview, Shojaian paid tribute to Sarah Hegazi, an LGBT activist and one of the concert attendees who raised the pride flag. Hegazi had committed suicide after having experienced traumatic incarceration and mistreatment in Egypt.

=== PaykanArtCar (2021) ===
A 1974 Paykan car once owned by politician Nicolae Ceaușescu, was acquired by the organization PaykanArtCar LLC; which in 2021 was painted and features a sound installation by Shojaian. The car paintings include imagery from Shahnameh, a tenth century Persian epic poem; Navid Afkari, an Iranian wrestler who was executed by the state; and imagery inspired by Ali Fazeli Monfared, a young gay man who was beheaded by his family members when his family discovered his sexuality. The sound art installation includes a track from Monfared reading a note to his boyfriend, who had fled to Turkey days prior to his murder.

This work was shown for the first time in October 2021 at the Human Rights Foundation's Oslo Freedom Forum in Miami, Florida. This work was to be shown at the Asia Now art fair in Paris in late October 2021. The invitation to show the work was retracted, with a statement by the founder Alexandra Fain for fear of endangering the safety of the people working with Asia Now by showing this work.

== See also ==
- List of Iranian artists
