= Sarde After Dinner =

Lebanese podcast

Sarde After Dinner (سردة)

Presentation
- Hosted by: Médéa Azouri, Mouin Jaber
- Genre: Social commentary
- Language: Lebanese Arabic (some English, French)
- Updates: Weekly
- Length: Approx. 90–160 minutes

Publication
- Original release: October 2020

Related
- Website: sardeafterdinner.com

Sarde After Dinner (Arabic: سردة or سردة بعد العشاء) was a Lebanese podcast hosted by Médéa Azouri and Mouin Jaber.

== History ==
Sarde, as the show is also known, was started in the aftermath of the 17 October Revolution as a way to discuss the issues plaguing Lebanon and the country's failing government. In January 2025, Azouri announced in an interview that Sarde had ceased, with each host "going their own way."

=== Hosts ===
Azouri is French-Lebanese journalist who has written for L’Orient-Le Jour and Noun Magazine. In addition to co-hosting Sarde, Jaber also worked as digital producer for MBC Podcasts. He is the son of well known Lebanese journalist and media consultant Ali Jaber.

== Format ==
The show typically features Médéa and Mouin interviewing prominent cultural, social, and political figures primarily from Lebanon, but also the wider Arab world.

== Production ==
Episodes were primarily recorded in Azouri's Beirut apartment. They were also filmed and posted on YouTube.

== Notable episodes ==
In a September 2022 episode, Hamed Sinno, the lead singer of Mashrou' Leila, broke the news that the group had disbanded.

== Notable guests ==
- Mia Khalifa
- Hamed Sinno
- Bassem Youssef
- Nadine Labaki
- Bassel Khaiat
- Georges Khabbaz
