= Gerges =

Gerges is a surname. Notable people with the surname include:

- Carl Gerges (born 1987), Lebanese musician and architect
- Hesdy Gerges (born 1984), Dutch kickboxer
- Fawaz Gerges (born 1958), Lebanese-American academic and author
- Patrice Gerges (born 1966), French paralympic athlete
