= Raed El Khazen =

Lebanese musician (born 1972)

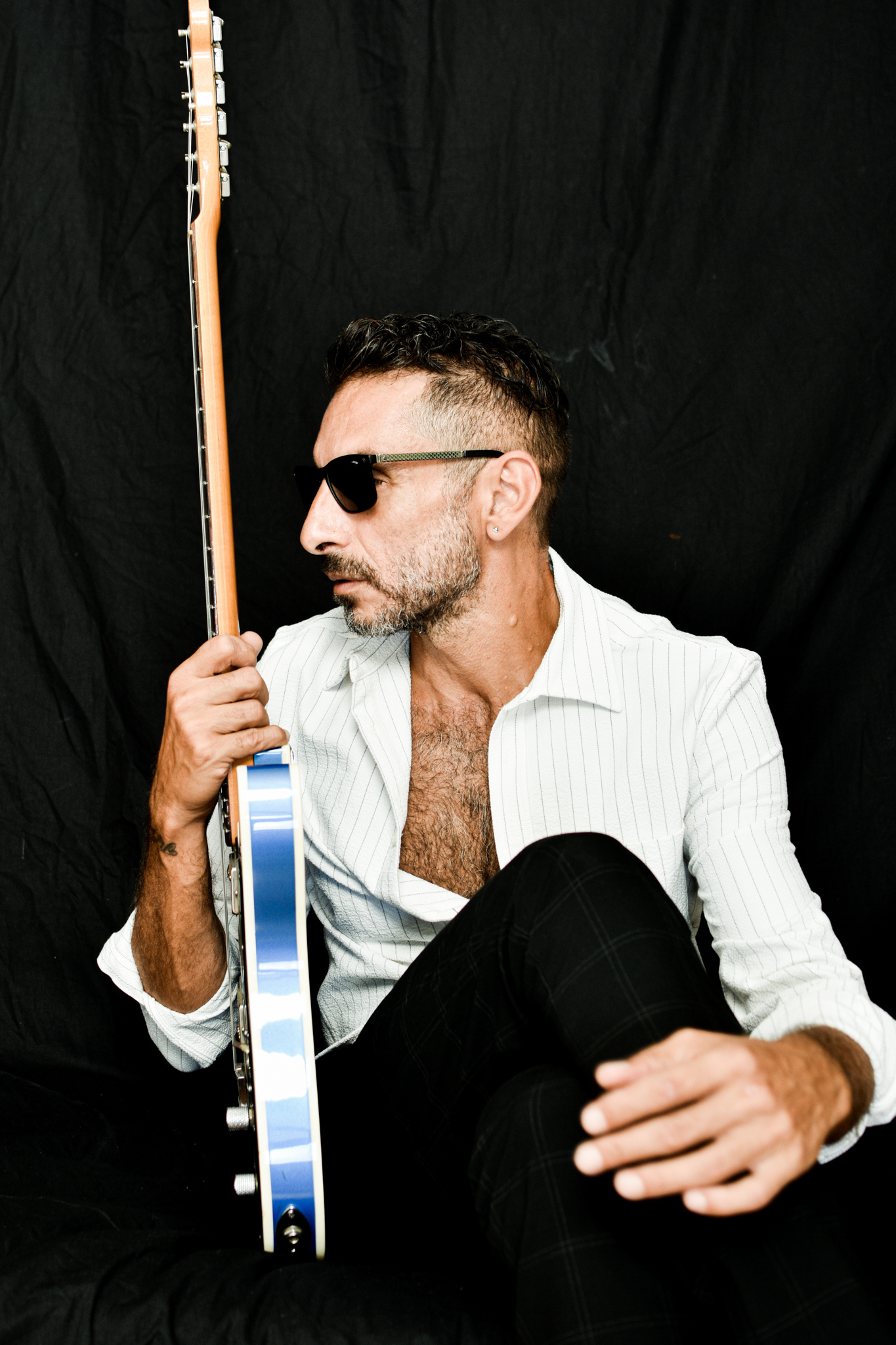

Background information
- Also known as: REK
- Born: October 27, 1972 (age 53); Beirut, Lebanon
- Genres: Jazz, world, blues-rock, blues-pop, rock, funk
- Occupations: Singer, guitarist, songwriter, record producer, film score composer
- Instruments: Vocals, guitar
- Years active: 2000–present
- Labels: East West Records, Atlantic Records, Verve Records, Bad Boy Records
- Website: raedelkhazen.art

Raed El Khazen is a Lebanese guitarist, singer, songwriter, record producer and film score composer. He is primarily known for his fusion of blues, funk and rock, as well as his versatile jazz guitar playing with a distinctive sound influenced by oriental and other world music – best represented on his album Ghosts and Shadows, released in 2016.

His tour history includes performing in his native Lebanon as well as United States, Brazil, Jordan, United Arab Emirates, Morocco, Tunisia, Algeria, Egypt, Kuwait, Syria and Guinea Equatorial.

== Musical career ==
Born in Lebanon and raised during the 15-year Lebanese Civil War, Raed El Khazen began playing guitar at the age of nineteen. While studying civil engineering in Beirut, he performed at small gigs but ultimately dropped out in 1992 to pursue a career in music. He was initially drawn to blues guitarists such as Jimi Hendrix, Albert King, Albert Collins, Stevie Ray Vaughan, and David Gilmour, focusing primarily on blues-driven music.

In 1996, El Khazen received a scholarship to attend Berklee College of Music in Boston, Massachusetts. There, he was introduced to the music of Thelonious Monk, Miles Davis, Charlie Parker, Sonny Rollins, Wes Montgomery, and Grant Green. Immersing himself in jazz and improvised music, he spent the next decade studying various eras of jazz and African-American music. During this time, he studied privately with John Abercrombie and attended master classes and clinics with Pat Metheny, John Scofield, Pat Martino, Wayne Krantz, and others.

After graduating, he moved to New York City, where he lived and worked from 2000 to 2010. In New York, he collaborated with both emerging and established artists, including Avishai Cohen, Jojo Meyer, Kermit Driscoll, Derek Neirvelgelt, Manu Koch, Stephane Mercier, Ben Zwerin, Juancho Herrera, Chris Cheek, Zach Jones, Gavin DeGraw, John Hicks, René McLean, Aaron Johnston, Didi Gutman, and Jesse Murphy, among others.

As the leader of the New Light Quartet, he worked alongside Avishai Cohen (trumpet), Daniele Camarda (bass guitar), and Marko Djordjevic (drums). The group recorded an album titled Shadow Hunting, though it remains officially unreleased.

In 2008, he recorded the album Losing My Reality with the New York rock band Running Still for East West Records, a label of Warner Music Group. The album was later released under the title Running Still by lead singer Asi Meskin in 2025.

In 2010, Raed El Khazen returned to Beirut, where he spent the next six years primarily producing emerging Arab artists, including Mashrou' Leila, Tanjaret Daghet, and Hello Psychaleppo. During this period, he also composed music for film and television, contributing to The Mountain (2010) by Ghassan Salhab, Blind Intersections (2012) by Lara Saba, and Yalla Aa'belkon (2015) by Elie Khalife. El Khazen independently recorded his album Ghosts and Shadows, collaborating with musicians Walid Sadek (trumpet), Tarek Khuluki (synths, Tanjaret Daghet), Dani Shukri (drums, Tanjaret Daghet), and Derek Nievergelt (bass, production). The album is best described as a sonic exploration blending Arab cultural influences with Western instrumentation.

== Song Releases ==
Year	Title	Album
2016	"Gypsy Travels"	Ghosts And Shadows
2016	"The Good People"	Ghosts And Shadows
2016	"Whale Song"	Ghosts And Shadows
2016	"Mr. Brown"	Ghosts And Shadows
2016	"Circles"	Ghosts And Shadows
2016	"The Twins"	Ghosts And Shadows
2016	"Mawal"	Ghosts And Shadows
