= Carl Gerges =

Lebanese musician and architect (born 1987)

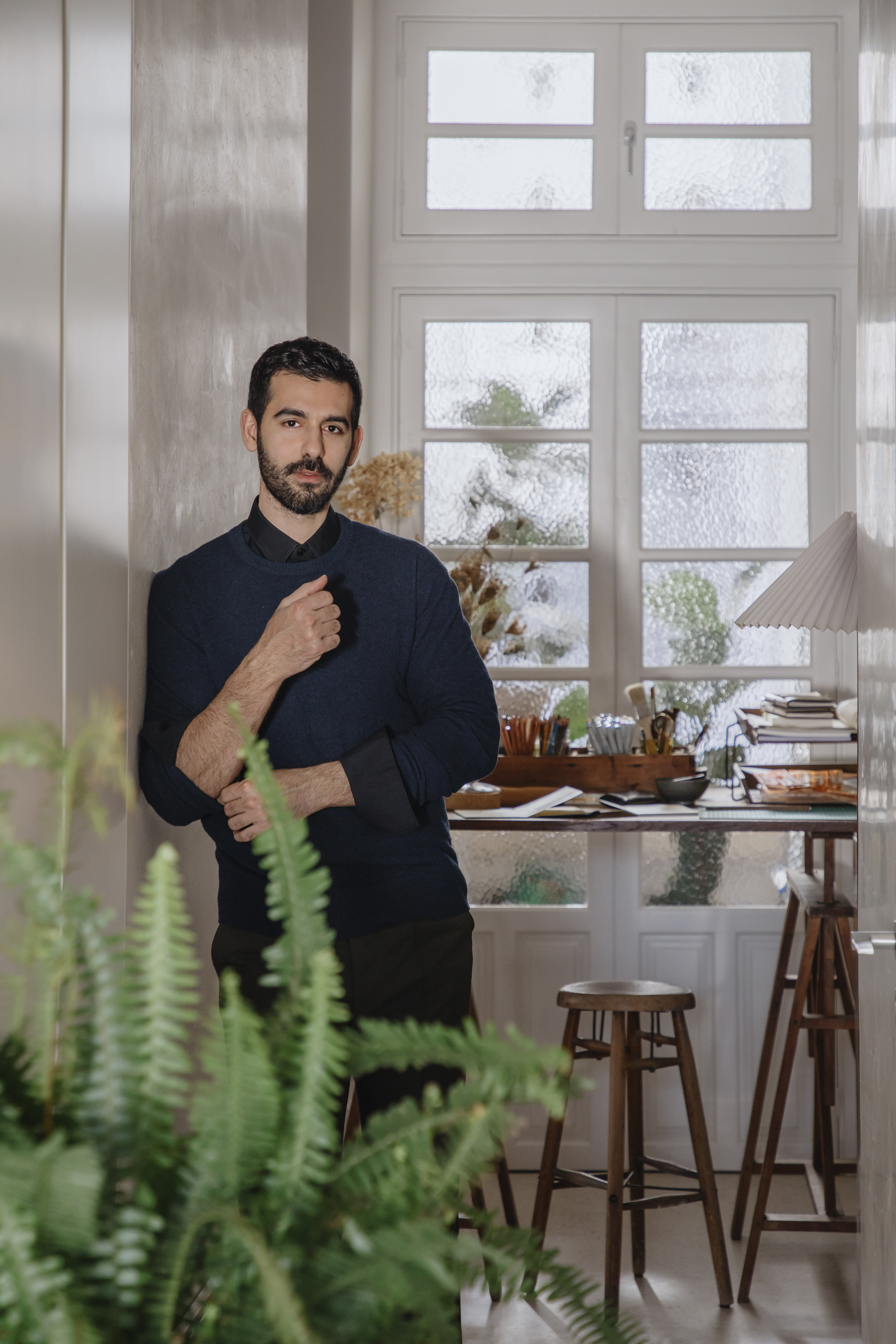
- Carl Gerges in his studio, Beirut, 2019

Background information
- Born: December 5, 1987 (age 38); Beirut, Lebanon
- Occupations: Architect; Composer; Drummer

Carl Gerges is a Lebanese musician and architect. Gerges has been featured on the cover of L'officiel Levant and on the cover of Architectural Digest Middle East as an architect; and on the Middle East edition of Rolling Stone magazine and GQ Middle East as a musician.

== Biography ==
Carl Gerges was born on December 5, 1987, in Beirut. He started playing the drums and the piano at an early age. Gerges co-founded Mashrou' Leila in 2008 while studying architecture at the American University of Beirut. He officially launched his architecture studio Carl Gerges Architects in March 2020.

== Music career ==
Gerges is one of the founding members of Mashrou' Leila along with Hamed Sinno, Haig Papazian and Firas Abou Fakher. He started playing the drums, synths and electronics, and composing songs with the band in 2008. He's also heavily involved in the artistic direction of the band's music videos, visuals, and stage design.

In 2017 Gerges taught a graduate workshop at the Hagop Kevorkian Institute for Near Eastern Studies at NYU as part of Mashrou' Leila. He also collaborated with notable artists like Roisin Murphy, Joe Goddard, Brian Eno, and Yo Yo Ma.

In 2019 Gerges performed at the Metropolitan Museum of Art as part of British artist Oliver Beer's Vessel Orchestra Exhibition alongside several notable artists including John Zorn, Nico Muhly and several others.

== Architecture career ==
After pursuing a decade of architectural ventures, Gerges launched his studio, Carl Gerges Architects. His home, which he designed, got a cover story in Architectural Digest Middle East.
