= Zahed Sultan =

Multimedia artist, culture producer and social entrepreneur

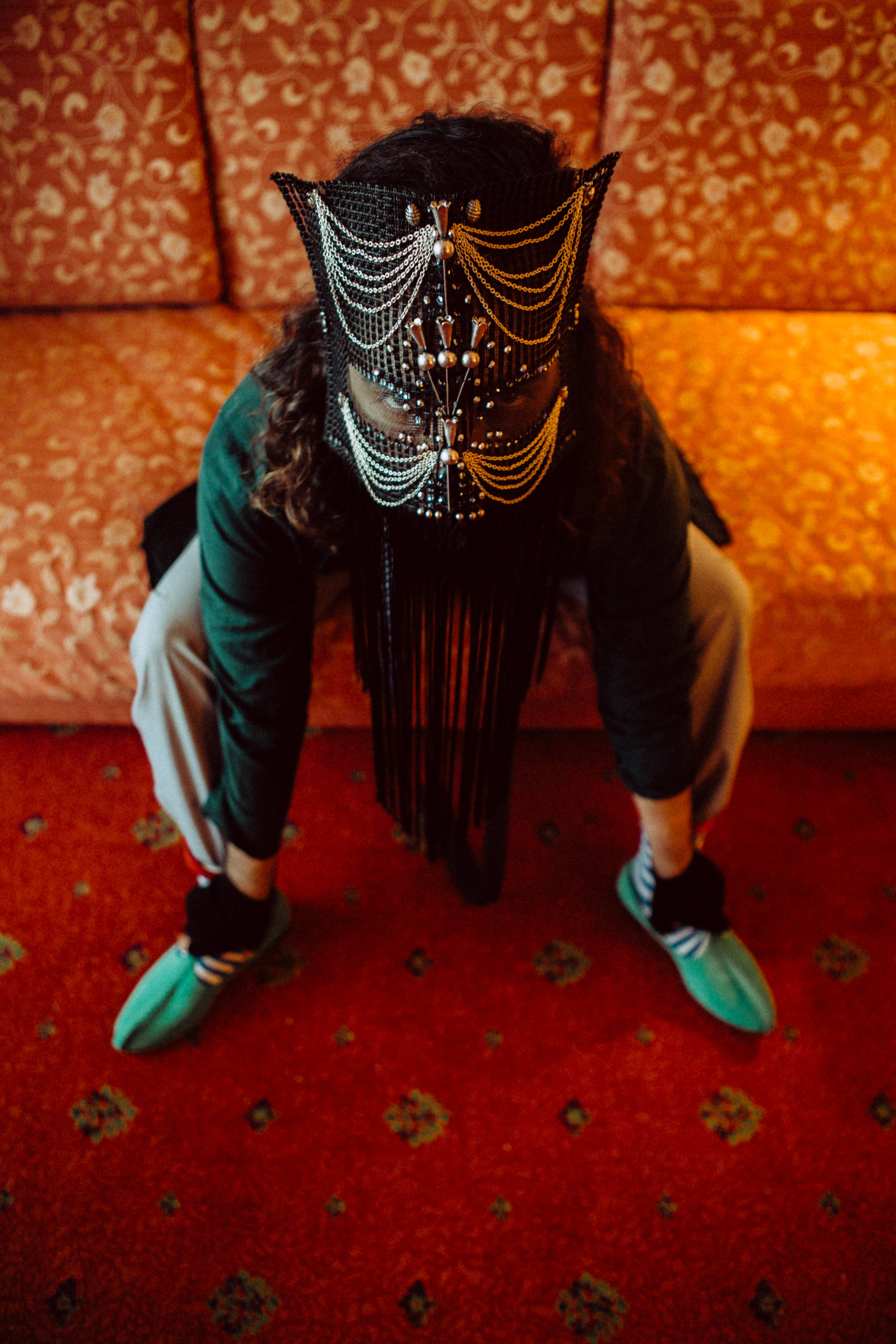
- Sultan photographed in Tunis, 2019

Background information
- Origin: Kuwait, India
- Genre: Various
- Occupations: Multimedia artist; culture producer; social entrepreneur
- Instruments: Vocals; keyboards; software
- Years active: 2011–present
- Website: zahedsultan.com

Zahed Sultan is a multimedia artist, culture producer, filmmaker, and social entrepreneur of Kuwaiti-Indian heritage based in London, England. He has performed and presented his work internationally. Sultan is particularly known for his live audio-visual-dance performances.

== Music ==
=== Career beginnings ===
Sultan began his career as a teenager, DJing for both mixed and segregated parties in Kuwait. During his time in college, he worked as a promoter for nightclubs around Boston, Massachusetts, in the United States. Sultan wrote his first track using a PC and an analog Roland sampler to program and sequence the song. Several years later, he created a small body of work entitled illusive for a local exhibition in Kuwait and won third place in DJ Sasha's Involver remix competition with Global Underground and Ableton. Sultan's remix was later signed by Sasha's label Xpander to the TV series Crime Scene Investigation (CSI).

=== Releases ===
Sultan released his debut album Hi Fear, Lo Love in 2011, and the music reflected his own cultural background. Its first single, "I Saw Her, I Fell For Her", was licensed to the movie 11.6, directed by Philippe Godeau. Its second single, "I Want Her But I Don't Want Her", was featured on Stephane Pompougnac's internationally acclaimed Hôtel Costes, Vol. 15 compilation, becoming the first modern track from the Persian Gulf area to be featured on a global music compilation. MTV Iggy featured Sultan's third single, "Walkin Away", and highlighted Sultan as an emerging artist from the Middle East. The album was followed up with a string of remixes by emerging artists.

In 2012, Sultan released an EP titled Reuse Me for an eco-friendly exhibition he organizes in Kuwait called REUSE. The song "Like This" from the EP won favourable reviews by a number of online magazines and blogs, such as The East / West Sound. In 2013, Sultan was also featured on O2 Academy TV in London, UK.

In 2014, Sultan released "Ghazi", the first single from his second album eyeamsound, which provided a glimpse into the alternative electronic sound of the record. A second single, "Democrazy", followed in 2015, and the album was released worldwide that summer. Musically, Sultan describes the songs on the album as having "a lot of texture and body to them". On the album, he mostly sings in Arabic and English. With titles such as "Bedoon", the third single inspired by the life of stateless people in Kuwait, Sultan took a distinctively more socio-political route. Music from the album was featured on Hype Machine and a short film released by Red Bull highlighted his sound and live performance format. "Strengthening Sultan's rapidly increasing discography", in 2016 he released the single "Cake & Butter". "Venturing into the alt-rock genre in his own unique way," Sultan's vocals on the song "bear some resemblance to the Lizard King himself, The Doors' Jim Morrison."

In 2017, Sultan released the Hiwar Sessions EP, which featured dub and experimental remixes of heritage pearl-diving songs by emerging producers from Kingston, Ramallah, Beirut, and Bombay. In 2018, he released another EP to support his first music documentary film, Vibrations. He recorded the EP at Bob Marley's Tuff Gong Studios in Kingston, Jamaica, with young musicians from the reggae and dancehall scenes. The EP featured two single releases, "Mama Bamba" (2017) and "Monkey Riddim" (2018).

In 2020, Sultan released "Layl", a cinematic "homage to the '70s disco song "Do You Love Me" by Lebanese group The Bendaly Family, [...] and by taking a darker and more sombre path, the song took on a deeper meaning of love and loss». Soon after, Sultan released "Ana", a folk-pop song that reimagines the legendary singer and late poet from the Western Sahara, Mariem Hassan's song "Arrabi al Arabe". Sultan adds beats, percussions, and synths, and sings with Mariem in Arabic to build on calls of freedom and unity. In a follow-up to "Ana", Sultan released "Hindi Majnoon" in 2021, a pop-nostalgia song and music video about being bullied for being half-Indian while growing up in Kuwait. In 2022, he released "Dalal" and "Dalal – Instrumental", a reimagined version of "Asho", an iconic '90s party song from Kuwait by Miami Band. In the song, Sultan "reframes the lyrics and melody into an intimate piano/orchestral ballad that explores themes of loss and separation from loved ones".

In 2023, Sultan released the El Remixes EP, a collection of three songs "Layl", "Hindi Majnoon", and "Dalal" which he reimagined into dance / club tracks that take listeners on a journey through the artist's Pop Nostalgia sound. In 2025, Sultan released "INTI", a crossover song that brings together contemporary Afrobeats and Dancehall fused with traditional Arabian Gulf percussions, nostalgic 80s synths and playful Arabic rhythmic vocals.

In an interview with London Live, Sultan described his music as "alternative electronic", using live instrumentation as well as electronic music to "fuse those worlds in a live scenario [and blur] the lines between analog and digital". Sultan's music and performance style continues to evolve using a cross-disciplinary approach. "His creativity manifests in a seemingly endless repertoire of cool masks, each one an art in its own right."

=== Live performance ===
Sultan puts a great focus on collaboration, in the studio and when performing live. He has worked with emerging and established artists from around the world, including Europe, Asia and North America on various multimedia projects.

In 2015, Sultan was part of Doug Aitken's Station to Station: A 30 Day Happening at the Barbican Centre in London, UK, for the Shubbak Festival. During a short on-site residency at the Gallery, Sultan created an "immersive experience", drawing from past live performances and music supported by artists from different disciplines. That same year, The Vinyl Factory released a short film of the project.

Another project that highlights Sultan's live performance style is his project Hiwar which reimagines traditional pearl-diving music from the Persian Gulf region. Hiwar was developed in Sharjah in 2016 and then reproduced in Dubai in 2017, to kick off the inaugural RBMA Weekender in the Arab region. Sultan also premiered a short film related to the project, alongside an in-depth interview with RBMA discussing "the utilitarian purpose of pearl-diving music, the evolution of related forms in the Persian Gulf and how to celebrate cultural diversity without being a purist. That same year, Zahed was commissioned to re-imagine and perform land, mountain and sea music from Oman supported by local and international artists. Boiler Room 4:3 released a short film about the project in 2018. The film was also included in The Place I Call Home exhibition, which toured cities in the UK and Persian Gulf from 2019 to 2020. Sultan continues to develop and perform Hiwar in various audio, visual and dance formats in the Middle East, North Africa, the UK and Europe.

In 2019, Sultan performed a Soundbath project in London to "explore the potentiality for electronic music to be a source of healing".

=== Music production ===
In addition to his own projects, Sultan has worked as a music producer for Saudi Arabian singer / songwriter tamtam, on her debut single / remixes EP Little Girl in 2012 and her Games EP in 2014.

In 2017, Sultan contributed to composer and conceptual-artist Fatima Al Qadiri's EP Shaneera as the vocals tracking engineer for the album at his recording studio in Kuwait, contributing to ″a safe space where they could be at ease″.

In 2020, Sultan produced two songs "CONTROL" and "WAYWTD" for Yemeni/British artist intibint's debut EP What Are You Willing To Do.

== Film ==
Having released music videos and short films between 2011 and 2017, Sultan completed his first documentary film, Vibrations, in 2018, which he co-directed and executive produced. The film follows Sultan's journey as he re-imagines heritage music from Kuwait in the form of a cultural exchange with young musicians in Kingston, Jamaica, while emphasizing the role social and political challenges played in forming a vibrant, creative community in the country today. Vibrations received special screenings in London and Kuwait in 2018, each included a short performance and q&a with the audience. Vibrations was also screened in film festivals and independent cinemas from 2018 to 2019 and received awards at the Scandinavian International Film Festival and Houston International Film and Video Festival and official selections by the Brighton Rocks Film Festival and Amsterdam International Filmmaker Festival.

Sultan continues to release short films through his work in live performance and culture.

== Culture ==
While developing his music career, Sultan has put an emphasis on environmental awareness. This can be traced back to an exhibition he created in 2007 called REUSE, which promoted eco-friendly living through art. Various editions of the exhibition featured up-and-coming talents from Kuwait through to renowned international artists such as Hassan Hajjaj and Jose Gonzalez. In 2016, Sultan redirected the exhibition's focus "to create a space for artists and audiences to interact using digital media, with an emphasis on light, sound and physical performance." REUSE was presented in Dubai in 2017 and most recently at The Scientific Center in Kuwait in 2019 to "offer people the opportunity to investigate and make their own decisions about complex environmental issues."

In 2019, Sultan was honoured with the HSSE Award by Kuwait Integrated Petroleum Industries Company (KIPIC) for his work in striving to raise eco-awareness in the region. "It's about [nurturing] a kind of citizen who is aware of their imprint on the system," says Sultan.

Sultan has also been referred to as "Kuwait's one-man music industry" and "the man single-handedly pushing it forward". In 2014, he compiled a soundscape for the travelling design exhibition titled Islamopolitan that featured contemporary music from the Middle East, which showed in Sharjah, Istanbul, Milan and Kuwait. In 2015, Sultan created the Kuwait Rising music festival with Red Bull to feature emerging music from the Arab world and beyond. Over the years, the festival has hosted artists from South Asia, MENA, Europe, UK and US such as Joss Stone and HVOB. The festival faced public backlash in 2019 when Lebanese band Mashrou' Leila was invited to perform "on the basis that they 'promote homosexuality' which is strongly condemned." In 2017, Sultan was invited by UK music blog Stamp The Wax to create a City Guide to his favourite places in Kuwait, along with a music mix of emerging talent from the country. "Zahed is helping grow Kuwait's unique underground music scene and put the Arab city on the international alternative music scene's map." In 2020, he introduced a new rhythm and poetry series called G.O.A.T to highlight artists shaping culture and society.

Sultan is "not afraid to express himself through drastically different means and mediums". In London, he has taken an interest "in creating a space for people who come from communities with marginalized voices to come together". He developed a residency program and multi-arts festival in 2019 called Haramacy to amplify Middle Eastern and South Asian voices in the city. Acting as a catalyst for cross-cultural engagement, Haramacy creates a safe space for artists to explore intersectional social systems (race, gender, class and ethnicity) that exist within their communities. Adding to its activities in 2020, Haramacy "is also organizing talks and a publication that dive deeper into the subjects tackled by the [residency] program and festival". On completion of the "bold collection of necessary stories ranging from LGBTQ+ topics to race, culture, and faith", Sultan signed the book to an international crowdfunded publishing company in the UK, Unbound. In 2022, the Haramacy book was released across the UK in physical bookstores and online as "a discourse highlighting the many internal faultlines, conflicts and contradictions of identity and community". In the same year Sultan created the publication, he founded COMMUN to bring his culture projects together under one umbrella "with an overarching theme of community-building, touching upon more than one sense at a time." In 2021, COMMUN introduced an affordable subscription service via their website; offering grants, courses, videos, and more to share their learnings and bring people closer to the personal stories and practices of BIPOC voices.

Sultan also takes part in conferences to share his work and experiences with a wider audience. In 2016 Sultan was a panelist at the C/O Pop Festival in Cologne, Germany, discussing Cultural Entrepreneurship and how to learn from the creative music industry. In the same year, Sultan presented a performance talk at the Nuqat conference in Kuwait entitled The Institute of the Future. In 2017, Sultan presented a talk at the STEP Music Conference in Dubai on the inspiration behind his traditional pearl-diving music project, Hiwar. In 2019, Sultan travelled to Sydney, to participate on two panels at EMC, Middle East and North Africa's Electronic Revolution and Systemic Shift: Taking Sustainability from Buzz Word to Reality. In 2021, Sultan participated as a board member for the inaugural MDLBEAST XP music conference in Riyadh, Saudi Arabia and as a panelist on Music and Film: Exploring Beyond the Red Sea. In 2023, Sultan was a panelist at the English PEN Literary Salon at The London Book Fair's panel Creating a Writing Community in 2023 and discussed "some of the barriers and challenges writers face today, and how can they use their voices, experience and platforms to support others in their profession".

In 2025, Sultan launched a website and Instagram account to exhibit the visual and professional archive of his late father, Ghazi Sultan (1941-2007), a Kuwaiti architect and urban planner who is regarded as one of the key figures in the modernization of the State of Kuwait.

== Social Impact ==
In 2008, Sultan co-founded en.v, an organization that mobilizes and connects change-makers to effectively and collaboratively address community challenges, with the long-term goal of fostering a more compassionate, innovative and sustainable society. As part of its mission to enhance the impact of the civic sector in Kuwait, en.v creates inclusive spaces for members of the community to come together, share knowledge, increase coordination and spark collaborations, "to make citizens aware of their mark on society." "en.v has a number of programs that aim to influence Kuwaiti society for the better," through ongoing data collection and analysis, the organization responds to the needs and aspirations of local change-makers and "offers a forum for ideas and opinions, bravely touching upon issues considered taboo or rarely mentioned in Middle Eastern countries".

One such example is a program called AWAKEN which brings people together from different backgrounds to think creatively about social issues in Kuwait. Through activities such as a community building festival and participatory discussions, AWAKEN's goal is "to create an inclusive space for people from diverse sections of society where they can have their voices heard". In an effort to bring out stories hidden in the shadows, in 2020, en.v launched Neighbourhood Tales: Kuwait Under Lockdown to document the experiences of people living in Kuwait during the COVID-19 pandemic, focusing on "the communities that were being affected the most" with a "dignified collection of first-hand stories from people across different neighbourhoods, socioeconomic groups and cultures".

== Personal life ==
Sultan's father, Ghazi Sultan, is from Kuwait and studied at Harvard University under Bauhaus founder Walter Gropius and went on to co-found one of the largest architectural firms in the Middle East, KEO International Architects. He also co-founded a leading gallery for modern Arab art, Sultan Gallery. His mother, Aruna Sultan, is from India and is a landscape designer, "who championed the right of women to work onboard Air India at a time when the profession was considered disreputable". Sultan has two brothers, Nader Sultan and Tahir Sultan.

In 2025,

== Discography ==
Title	Year	Type
Hi Fear, Lo Love	2011	Studio album
eyeamsound	2015	Studio album
Hi Fear, Lo Love Remix EP	2011	EP
Reuse Me	2012	EP
Hiwar Sessions	2017	EP
Vibrations	2018	EP
"Cake & Butter"	2016	Single
"Layl"	2020	Single
"Ana" (ft. Mariem Hassan)	2020	Single
"Hindi Majnoon"	2021	Single
"Dalal"	2022	Single
El Remixes	2023	EP
INTI	2025	Single
"Little Girl" by tamtam	2012	As a producer
"Games" by tamtam	2014	As a producer
"Shaneera" by Fatima Al Qadiri	2017	As an engineer
"CONTROL" by intibint	2020	As a producer
"WAYWTD" by intibint	2020	As a producer

== Filmography ==
Title	Year	Role	Genre
I Want Her But I Don't Want Her	2011	Producer, director	Music Video
Like This (ha-ka-tha)	2012	Producer, director	Music Video
eyeamsound	2014	Producer, co-editor	Short Film
Resonance	2015	Producer	Short Film
Borders	Unreleased	Producer	Short Film
Cake & Butter	2017	co-editor	Music Video
Hiwar	2017	Producer, co-director	Short Film
Vibrations	2018	Executive producer, co-director	Documentary
Hiwar; Re-Imagining the Music of Oman	2018	Director	Short Film
Tension	2019	Director	Short Film
Haramacy	2020	Director, editor	Short Film
Layl	2020	Producer, director	Music Video
Hindi Majnoon	2021	Producer, director, editor	Music Video
Behind The Music	2023	Producer, co-editor	Short Film
INTI	2025	Producer, co-director, editor	Music Video
