= Ibrahim Badr =

Ibrahim Badr ابراهيم بدر
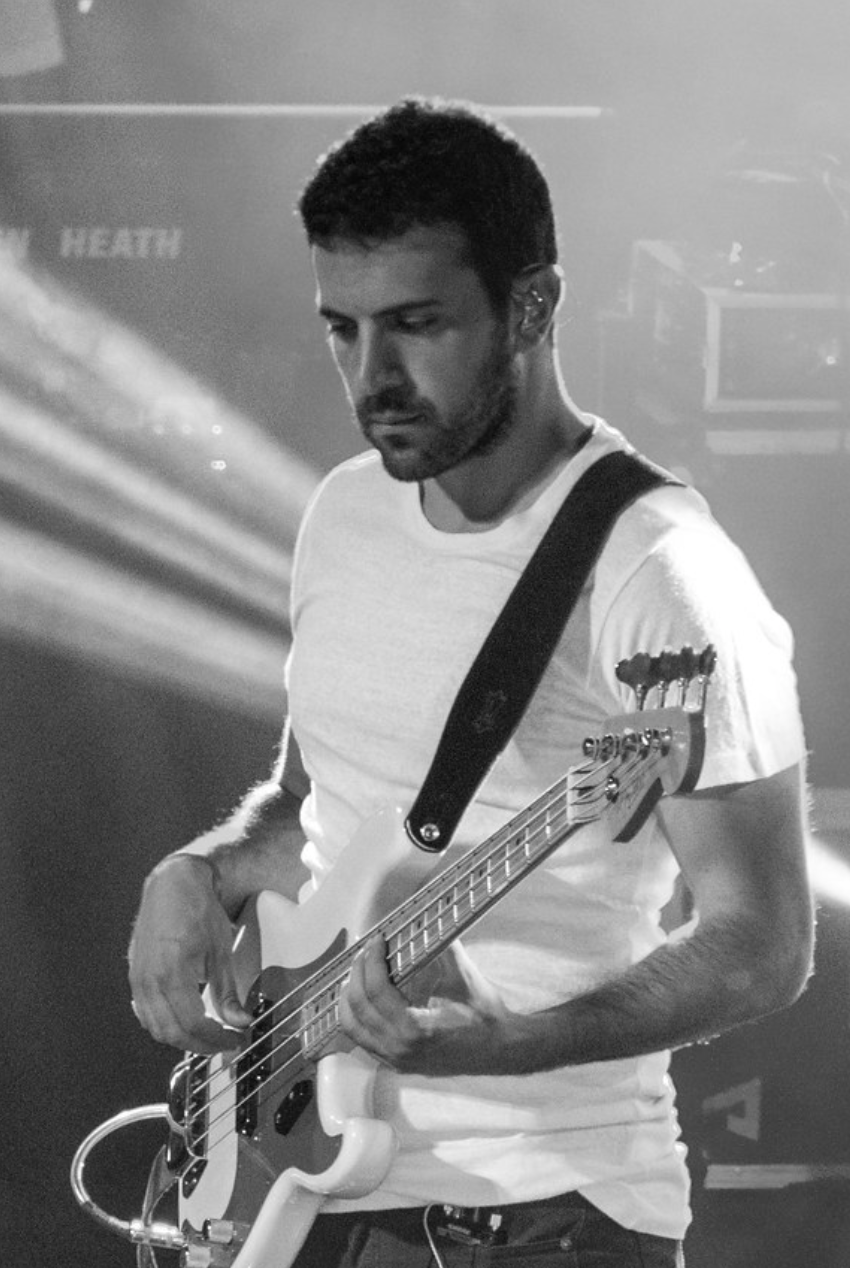
- Badr Live in Tunis

Background information
- Born: Lebanon
- Genres: Alternative rock, indie
- Occupations: Bass player; Product Manager; Engineer
- Formerly of: Mashrou' Leila

Ibrahim Badr (Arabic: ابراهيم بدر) is a Lebanese musician who was the bass player of alternative rock band Mashrou' Leila He is also a Product Manager at Google and has worked on Google Calendar, Google Assistant, and Google Lens.
