= Haig Papazian =

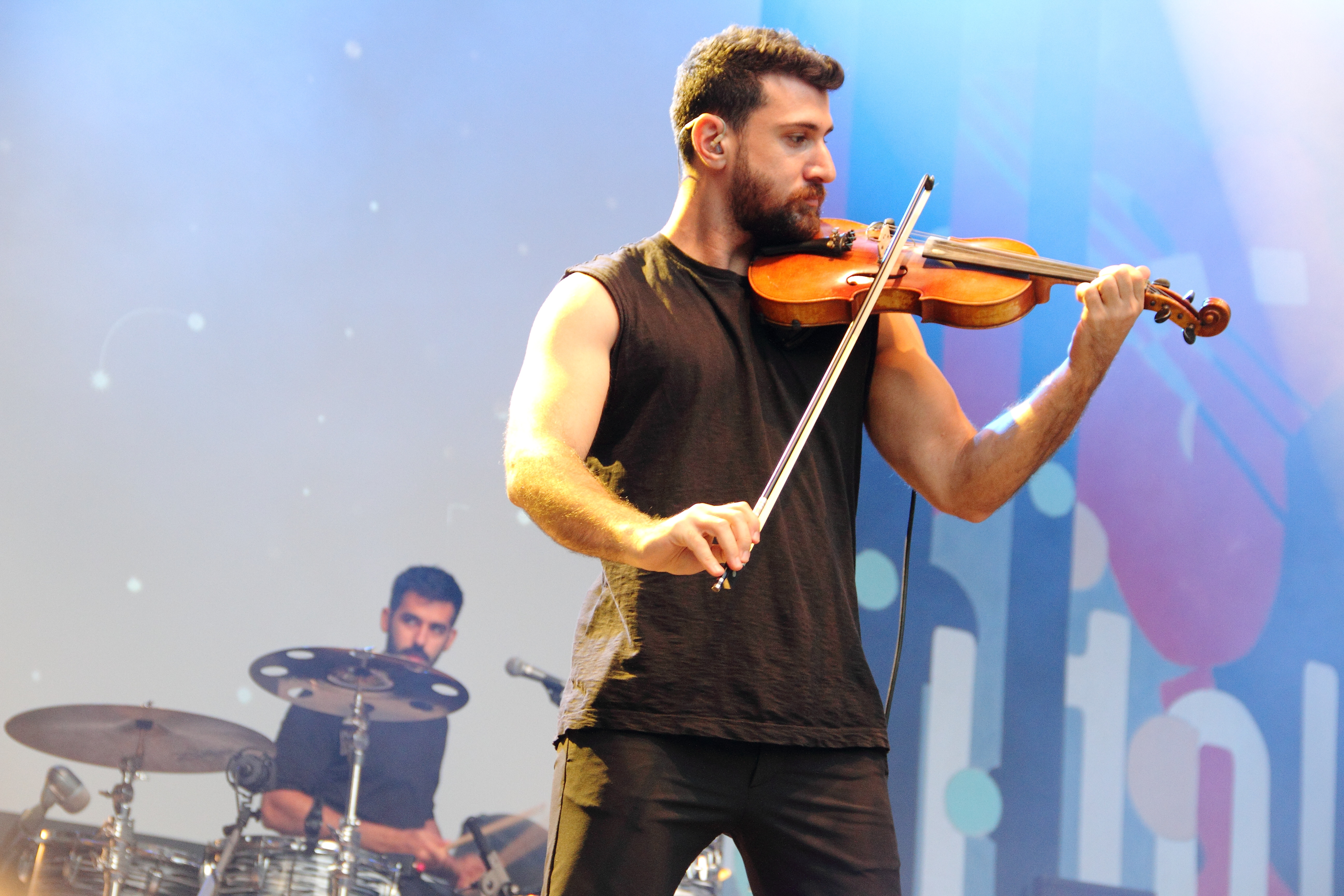
- Papazian at the Rudolstadt-Festival 2018

Background information
- Born: 8 December 1986 (age 39); Beirut, Lebanon
- Genres: Indie
- Occupations: Violinist; Multidisciplinary Artist; Architect
- Formerly of: Mashrou' Leila

Haig Papazian (Armenian: Հայկ Փափազեան, Arabic: هايغ بابازيان) is a Lebanese-Armenian multidisciplinary artist, composer, and architect born in Beirut and currently based out of New York. He is a founding member and violinist of Lebanese pop band Mashrou' Leila.

Papazian has been featured on the cover of the Middle East edition of Rolling Stone magazine as part of Mashrou' Leila., as well as GQ Middle East, Jdeed Magazine, CitizenK Arabia, and My.Kali the first Jordanian LGBTQ magazine.

== Early life and education ==
Papazian was born in Bourj Hammoud in 1986 in the Armenian neighbourhood east of Beirut, Lebanon. Growing up in the Armenian diasporic community in Lebanon, Papazian was drawn to art and music at a very early age. He joined Hamazkayin Armenian Cultural center and Music School where he first started to play the violin. Years later, while studying architecture at the American University of Beirut Papazian founded the band Mashrou' Leila.

== Career ==
=== Architecture ===
Papazian holds a Bachelor of Architecture from the American University of Beirut (2009) and a Masters in Architectural History from The Bartlett school of Architecture at UCL. He has received several academic awards including the Fawzi Azar Architecture prize in 2008 after winning an academic architectural competition designing a museum in Beirut. He is also the recipient of The Penrose Award for scholarship and leadership, and the Distinguished Graduate Award for outstanding academic achievement, character, as well as contribution to the department and to university life (2009) and the Said Foundation and British Lebanese Association scholarship to study in the UK. Papazian interned at Atelier Jean Nouvel in 2008 working on the Louvre Abou Dhabi Museum, and after graduating from AUB, he worked as a junior architect at Bernard Khoury DW5 Architecture in Beirut (2009-2012).

=== Mashrou' Leila ===
Papazian founded Mashrou' Leila, a Lebanese band whose electro-pop anthems about political freedom, race, gender and modern Arabic identity have challenged the status quo of the Middle-Eastern music industry.

Papazian, Hamed Sinno, Carl Gerges and Firas Abou Fakher form the current lineup of the band. Mashrou Leila was formed in 2008 at the American University of Beirut, when Papazian, the violinist, posted with guitarist Andre Chedid, and pianist Omaya Malaeb a music workshop invite for students at the department of architecture and Design looking to jam and write original music in Arabic. aside from writing, composing and playing the violin on stage with the band, Papazian was managing the online social media presence of the band, and was involved in the artistic direction of the band's image, communication, and visuals.

Alongside Mashrou Leila, Papazian taught a graduate workshop at the Hagop Kevorkian Institute for Near Eastern Studies at NYU as part of Mashrou' Leila. and also collaborated with notable artists like Roisin Murphy, Joe Goddard, Brian Eno, and Yo Yo Ma.

In 2019, prior to the pandemic, Papazian performed at the Metropolitan Museum of Art as part of British artist Oliver Beer's Vessel Orchestra Exhibition alongside several notable artists including, Nico Muhly.

=== Visual arts ===
Papazian has participated in Home Workspace program 2011-2012, the inaugural edition of the independent art study program by Ashkal Alwan, led by resident professor Emily Jacir, and guest artist lecturers including Alfredo jar, Franco (bifo) Berardi, hito steyerl, Hassan khan, among others. His visual work explores narratives of undocumented histories and reclaimed futures. Papazian’s installation of videos and drawings, Heroes of a Transitional Time, departs from historical depictions of the archetypal male, hero and martyr within Lebanon’s Armenian community, identifying ruptures through which to understand the flawed logic of hero-making. These flaws are embodied by the outdated, aestheticized and Sisyphean qualities of the renditions of heroism performed by Papazian’s actors. Papazian’s art has been presented in Beirut, Bonn, London, Trondheim and New York.

=== Other notable works ===
In 2020, Papazian was selected as SHIM:NYC 2021 resident - a program created by Artistic Freedom Initiative, Tamizdat, and Westbeth Artist Housing in NYC in partnership with New York Voices Commission from Joe’s Pub at the public theatre. Papazian is working on a new solo project, Space Time Tuning Machine. The first phase will premiere in May 2021 with a performance at Greenwich House Music School’s Uncharted music series, presented in conjunction with Joe’s Pub.
