= Sarah Hegazi =

Egyptian LGBT activist (1989-2020)

- سارة حجازي
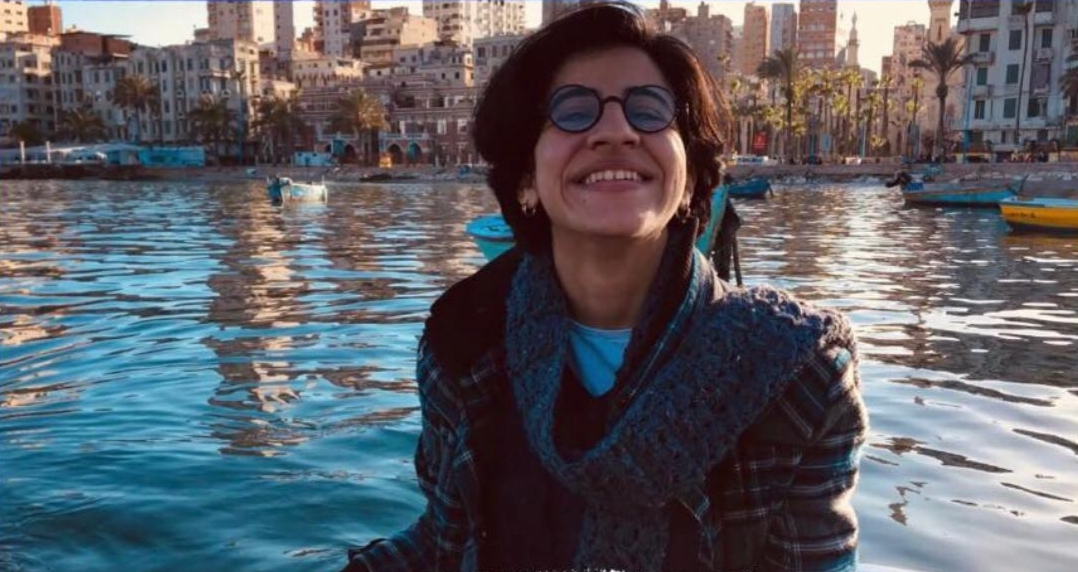
- Sarah Hegazi
- Born: 1 October 1989; Egypt
- Died: 14 June 2020 (aged 30); Toronto, Ontario, Canada
- Cause of death: Suicide
- Occupation: IT specialist
- Years active: 2016–2020
- Known for: LGBT, socialist and human rights activism

Sarah Hegazi (Arabic: سارة حجازي; 1 October 1989 – 14 June 2020; also rendered Hegazy or Higazy) was an Egyptian writer, LGBTQ activist, and socialist. She was arrested and imprisoned in Egypt for three months after waving a rainbow flag at a Mashrou' Leila concert in 2017 in Cairo. Hegazi subsequently suffered from post-traumatic stress disorder (PTSD) as a result of the torture she endured in prison. She died by suicide in June 2020.

== Early life and education ==
Hegazi was born on 1 October 1989 to an Egyptian conservative middle-class family; she was the eldest of four siblings. She helped her mother take care of her siblings after her father, a high school science teacher, died. Pictures of a young Hegazi in conservative Islamic garb, including a hijab, surfaced after her death. Hegazi wore the hijab until she came out as a lesbian in 2016.

In 2010, Hegazi graduated from Thebas Academy with a bachelor's degree in information systems and the American University in Cairo Continuing Education Center in 2016. Through distance learning, Hegazi completed certificates in "Fighting for Equality: 1950–2018", "Feminism and Social Justice", "Research Methods", "Diversity and Inclusion in the Workplace", and "Understanding Violence" at Columbia University, University of California Santa Cruz, SOAS University of London, the University of Pittsburgh, and Emory University.

== Political views ==
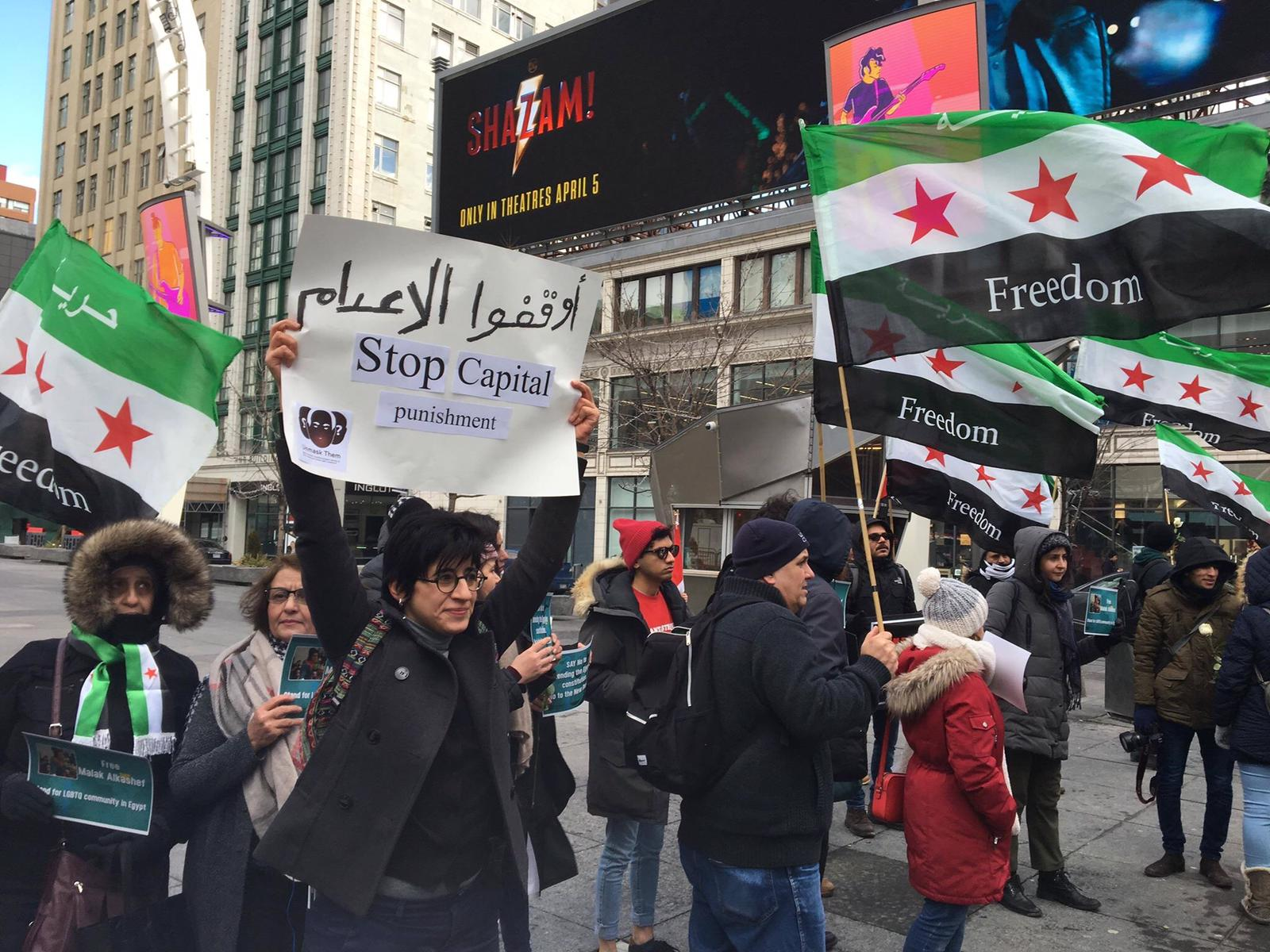
Hegazi during protests in Canada

Hegazi identified as a communist and supported the Bread and Freedom Party while living in Egypt, and became involved with the Spring Socialist Network once in Canada. Hegazi reported being fired from her job for opposing the Sisi regime in Egypt. Nine years after the Egyptian revolution of 2011, Hegazi wrote that "the old regime will try anything, even sacrificing important icons of their regime, in order to stay in power or regain power", describing President el-Sisi as "the most oppressive and violent dictator in our modern history" and writing that "revolutionaries believe the battle is one of class". Hegazi wrote that in consequence of the revolution being left incomplete, "most of us are now in the grave, in prison or exile."

== Persecution in Egypt ==
=== Arrest and asylum ===
On September 22, 2017, Sarah Hegazi attended a concert in Cairo for the Lebanese band Mashrou' Leila whose lead singer, Hamed Sinno, is openly gay. Hegazi was among a group of others arrested for waving a rainbow flag in support of LGBT rights. She was charged with joining an organization whose intent was to contravene the law by inciting acts of immorality or debauchery. Her arrest coincided with Egypt's zero-tolerance crackdown response to end public support for LGBT rights in the country. She was jailed for three months at Sayeda Zeinab police station where male agents incited inmates to beat her, and verbally and sexually assault her. In an article published by Mada Masr on September 24, 2018, Hegazi recounted her arrest. She wrote that she was arrested at home in front of her family, and that, during the process, the officer questioned her about her religion, why she removed her hijab, and whether she was a virgin or not. According to her account, the officer blindfolded her and took her by car to a location she did not know. She sat in a chair gagged with a cloth with her hands cuffed. She was subject to electric shock and she lost consciousness. She was also threatened that her mother would be harmed if she told anyone. Hegazi was released on 2 January 2018 and was fined £E1,000 (US$56); after her release, she struggled with depression, panic attacks and post-traumatic stress disorder. The media compared the arrest of Hegazi with the arrest of the Cairo 52. Fearing further prosecution, Hegazi sought asylum in Canada in 2018. Hegazi lost her mother to cancer one month after leaving Egypt.

=== Legal and political context ===
In Egypt, where homosexuality is not outlawed explicitly in jurisprudence, detention and charges are made on the basis of the 1961 "Law on Combating Prostitution" that sanctions debauchery and sex work. In October 2017, in the aftermath of the Mashrou' Leila's 2017 Cairo concert, a number of Egyptian members of the parliament submitted a law that sanctions homosexual acts with up to three years of prison. If convicted again, the convicts would face the possibility of being sentenced to imprisonment for five years. The law update was used to crack down on Egyptian LGBT individuals even though the updated law made no allusion to homosexuality. The update authorized the police to infiltrate chat rooms and dating apps, to pretend to be gay men and women and ensnare members of the LGBT community. According to the Egyptian government, the law was updated to address modern developments and to stop the internet and social media users from encouraging vice and the practice of prostitution. The LGBTQ+ community is posited as a national security threat by the Egyptian government, religious authorities, and political parties; this view is promoted by state-controlled media outlets.

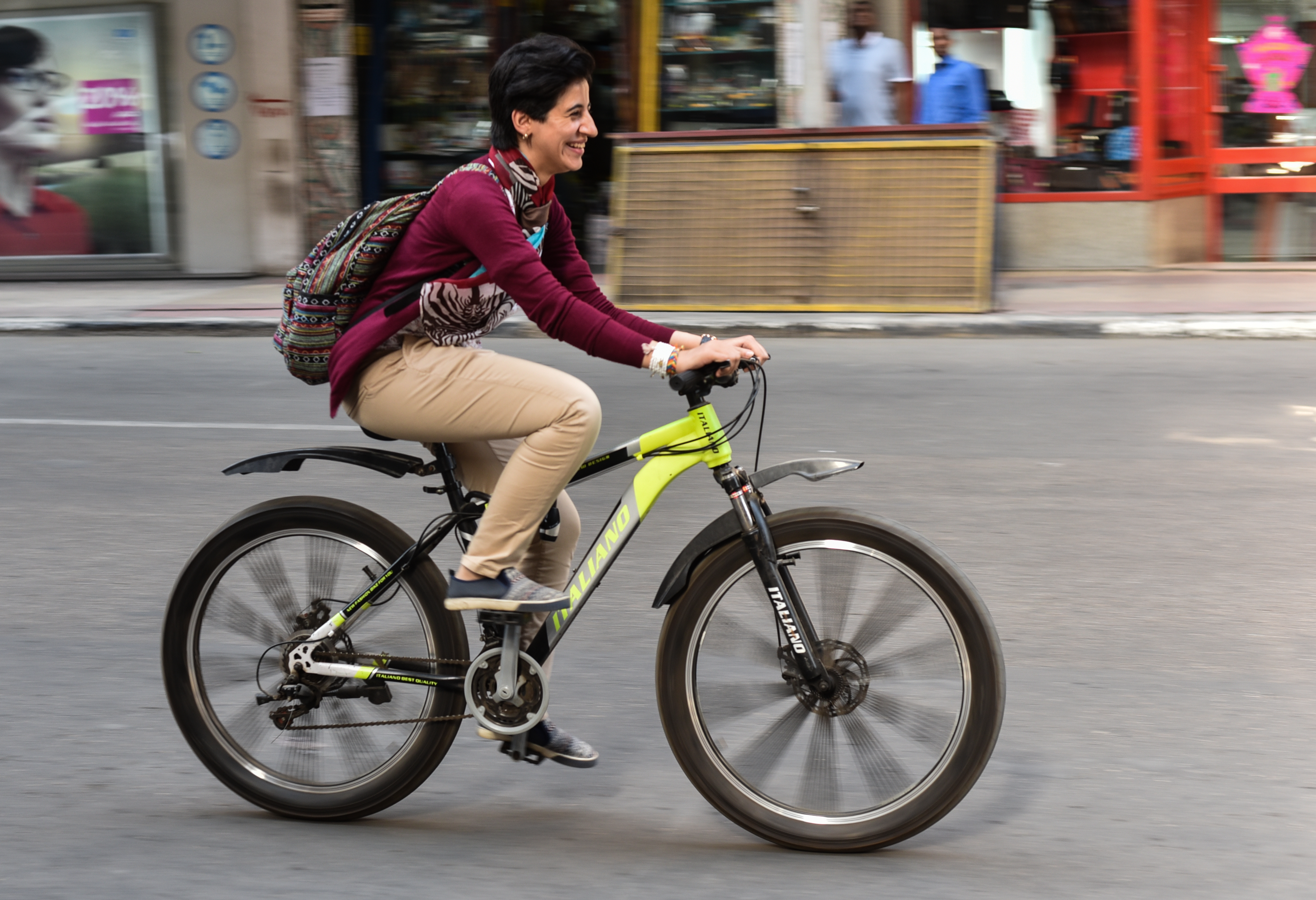
Sarah Hegazi on her bicycle in downtown Cairo

== Death and legacy ==
Hegazi died on 14 June 2020 in Toronto, Canada. On 15 June 2020, Hegazi's lawyer Khaled Al-Masry confirmed her death as suicide. A short letter written by Hegazi, in Arabic, circulated on social media following her death. The letter read: "To my siblings – I tried to survive and I failed, forgive me. To my friends – the experience was harsh and I am too weak to resist it, forgive me. To the world – you were cruel to a great extent, but I forgive." Her death was reported across a range of international news outlets, with tributes to her activism a recurring theme. Hamed Sinno, the frontman of the Lebanese band Mashrou' Leila shared a tribute on their Facebook profile to Hegazi which read "الحرية لروحك", or "Freedom for your soul". Sinno later composed and performed a song based on the words written by Hegazi shortly before her death. Visual art memorializing Hegazi has circulated widely since her death. Other Arab and Middle Eastern artists and public figures shared messages of sympathy and solidarity with Hegazi and the LGBT community among which Egyptian actor Amr Waked, Lebanese singer and stage actress Carole Samaha, Iranian painter and LGBT activist Alireza Shojaian, and Jordanian lawyer and journalist Ola Al-Fares.

The Canadian socialist magazine Spring published an obituary to Hegazi with Valerie Lannon writing: "I remember her saying 'I never felt so alive as during the revolution.' In her honour, and to fulfil our own sense of life, it is our duty to continue fighting for the revolution here, Egypt and around the world." During the 2020 Pride Month, the Arab LGBT community held vigils in the United States, Canada, London, Amsterdam, Berlin, Budapest and Beirut to commemorate Hegazi's life and struggle against homophobia; these came together with memorial vigils and events across the world. In Malta, the Allied Rainbow Communities and Moviment Graffitti commemorated Hegazi's death through a demonstration at the Egyptian Embassy and criticized the Maltese Government's designation of Egypt as a safe country to which refugees could be returned.

Hegazi was laid to rest in a rainbow coloured casket following a public funeral at St. John's Dixie Cemetery on 22 June 2020.

Commemorative events continued after Hegazi's funeral. The organizers of Global Pride, an online LGBT Pride event scheduled to take place on 27 June 2020, announced that fellow Egyptian militant Ahmed Alaa will pay tribute to Hegazi. Like Hegazi, Alaa was jailed after Mashrou' Leila's concert in 2017 for raising the gay pride flag. The 2020 version of the Napoli Pride event was dedicated to the memory of Sarah Hegazi; the organizers announced that they intended the event to be a warning against compulsion, violence and closed-mindedness. The Arab Network for Knowledge about Human Rights released a statement on behalf of 42 regional and international queer rights organizations commemorating Sarah Hegazi by announcing a Pride Day for Lesbian and Queer Women from the Middle East and North Africa. Pride Istanbul convened a panel commemorating the first anniversary after Hegazi's death. Activists in Toronto commemorated her by painting a mural of her in the gay village in Barbara Hall Park. Another commemorative mural was erected in Brighton, UK. A commemorative event by the Columbia Global Centers in Amman was cancelled due to government pressure.

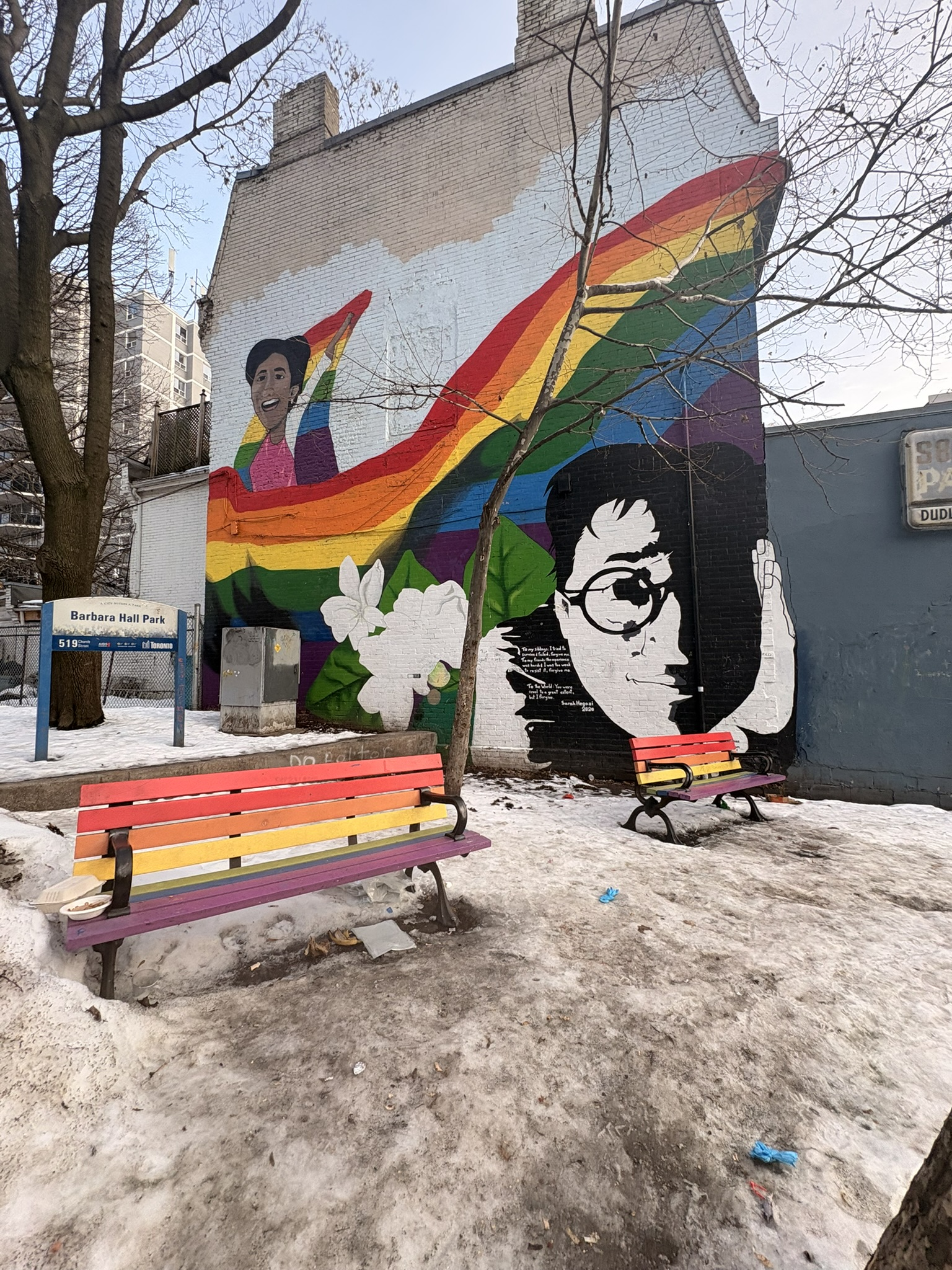
Sarah Hegazi Mural in Toronto 2026, by Keitha Keeshig-Tobias

The Association for Women's Rights in Development (AWID) named Sarah Hegazi in their tribute to "450 feminist activists who have changed our world".

John Greyson's 2021 experimental short documentary film International Dawn Chorus Day was created as a tribute to Hegazi and Shady Habash. A short documentary titled "The Sarah Hegazi Documentary" by director Nicole Teeny was a finalist of the 2022 Breaking Through the Lens jury.

In February 2023, the Tahrir Institute for Middle East Policy announced a fellowship commemorating Hegazi.

=== Reactions ===
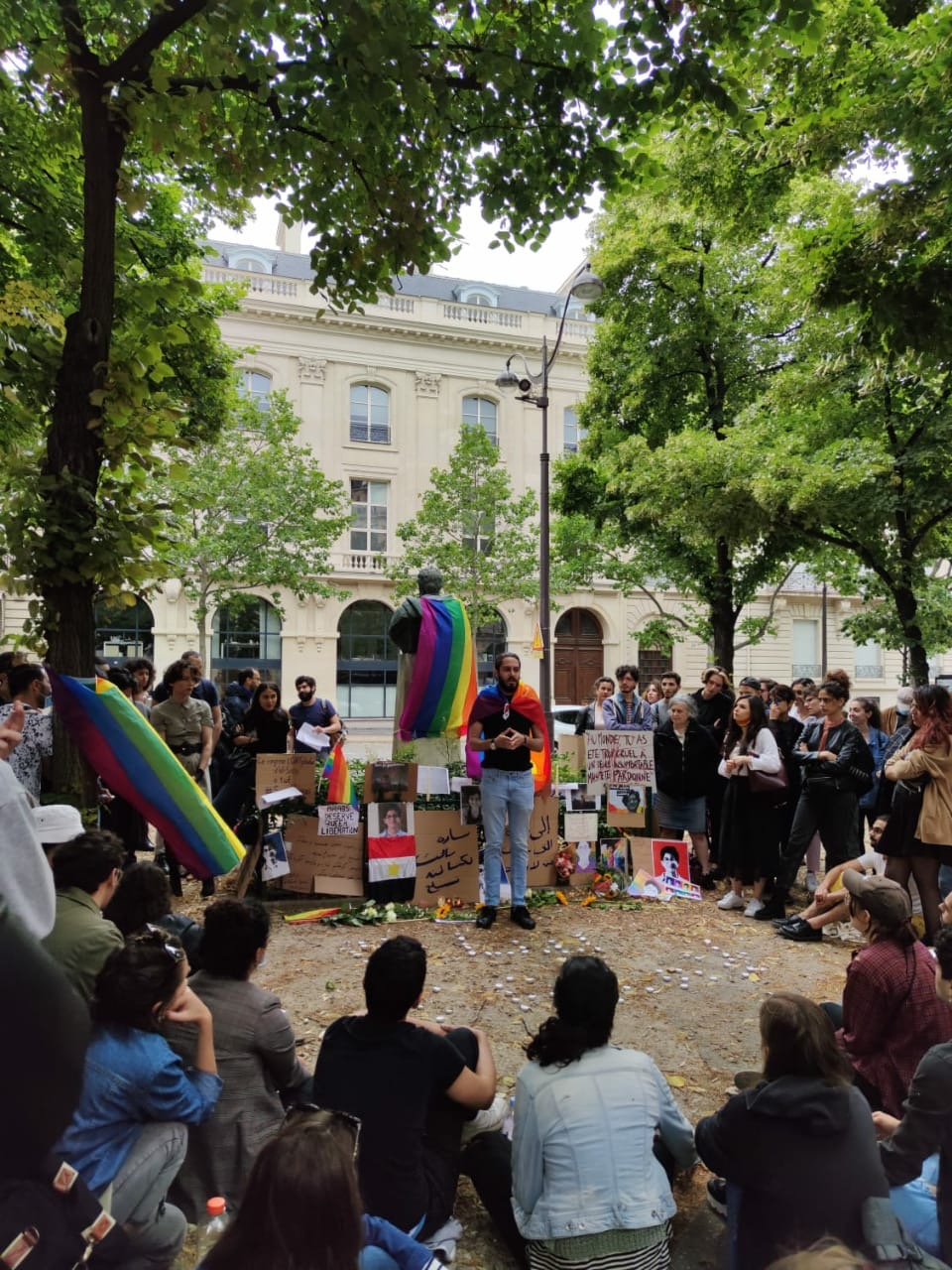
Paris vigil in memory of Hegazi, 20 June 2020

There is a long history of LGBT people being erased and oppressed both specifically in Egypt and in the broader context of the Middle East and North Africa (MENA) region. This occurs through censorship, hate-speech, and government coordinated persecution. Sarah Hegazi's death has been met with homophobic responses in the MENA region whether through government actions, media coverage, or public discourse, An article on Raseef22 which discussed the LGBT+ community in Jordan and the Sarah Hegazi mural in Amman was quickly deleted after the Jordanian journalist received a flood of threats online.

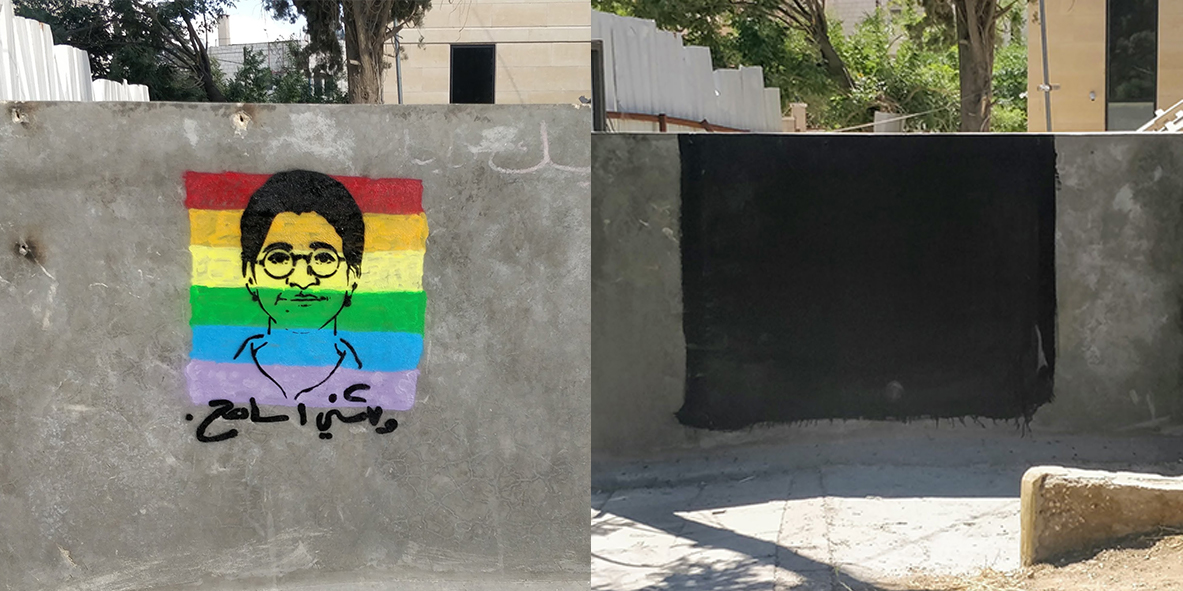
Sarah Hegazi mural in the Jordanian capital Amman, before and after blackout paint

Street murals and graffiti art commemorating Hegazi in the Jordanian capital Amman were speedily painted over after a social media uproar. A journalist decried the act in a tweet saying: "...the Amman Municipality worked until the late night hours on obliterating drawings by some aberrants [شواذ, an Arabic pejorative for homosexuals] in some areas of Amman. I am surprised that this category [homosexuals] exists even though it is foreign to our customs and traditions..." A spokesperson for the Greater Amman Municipality said: "Amman Mayor Yusef Al-Shawarbeh issued an order to all district managers to remove the murals."

Egypt's Bedayaa LGBT Organisation reported that the death of Hegazi and the ensuing media attention prompted an online homophobic and transphobic smear campaign against her and the LGBT community. Noor Selim, a transgender Egyptian man and the son of renowned actor Hesham Selim, blasted what he called societal hypocrisy and defended Hegazi's memory. On 23 June 2020, two Egyptian lawyers filed a lawsuit against Selim for defending Hegazi, and accused him of trying to "spread homosexuality" in Egypt.

Cheikh Rafiki, a Moroccan Muslim cleric, received death threats when he defended the memory of Hegazi from an online ISIL-related individual. A mural of her face and some of her last words are painted in Brighton, United Kingdom. On Arabic Wikipedia Hegazi's Wikipedia page was deleted, even though it existed in eight languages on Wikipedia at the time, and instead it was merged as one of the sections in the "Homosexuality" page. An Arabic Wikipedia community member explained their decision by claiming the "lack of sufficient notability of Hegazi". Their decision angered activists, who accused the website of "bias", and it opened the door for discussions about the editing standards on Arabic Wikipedia and about the freedom of expression on the platform which is "open to everyone". The band Mashrou' Leila, whose concert Hegazi attended, declared that it was disbanding in September 2022. The lead singer, Hamed Sinno, cited the death of Sarah Hegazy as a contributing factor to the decision to disband.

Italian photographer Umberto Nicoletti published a book titled "Asylum", in collaboration with the 519 Church Street, CIG Arcigay, and other LGBT organizations that offer refugees support programs. The book recounts the stories of LGBT asylum seekers, and opens with Hegazi's story.
