= Hamed Sinno =

Lebanese-American singer

Hamed Sinno حامد سنّو
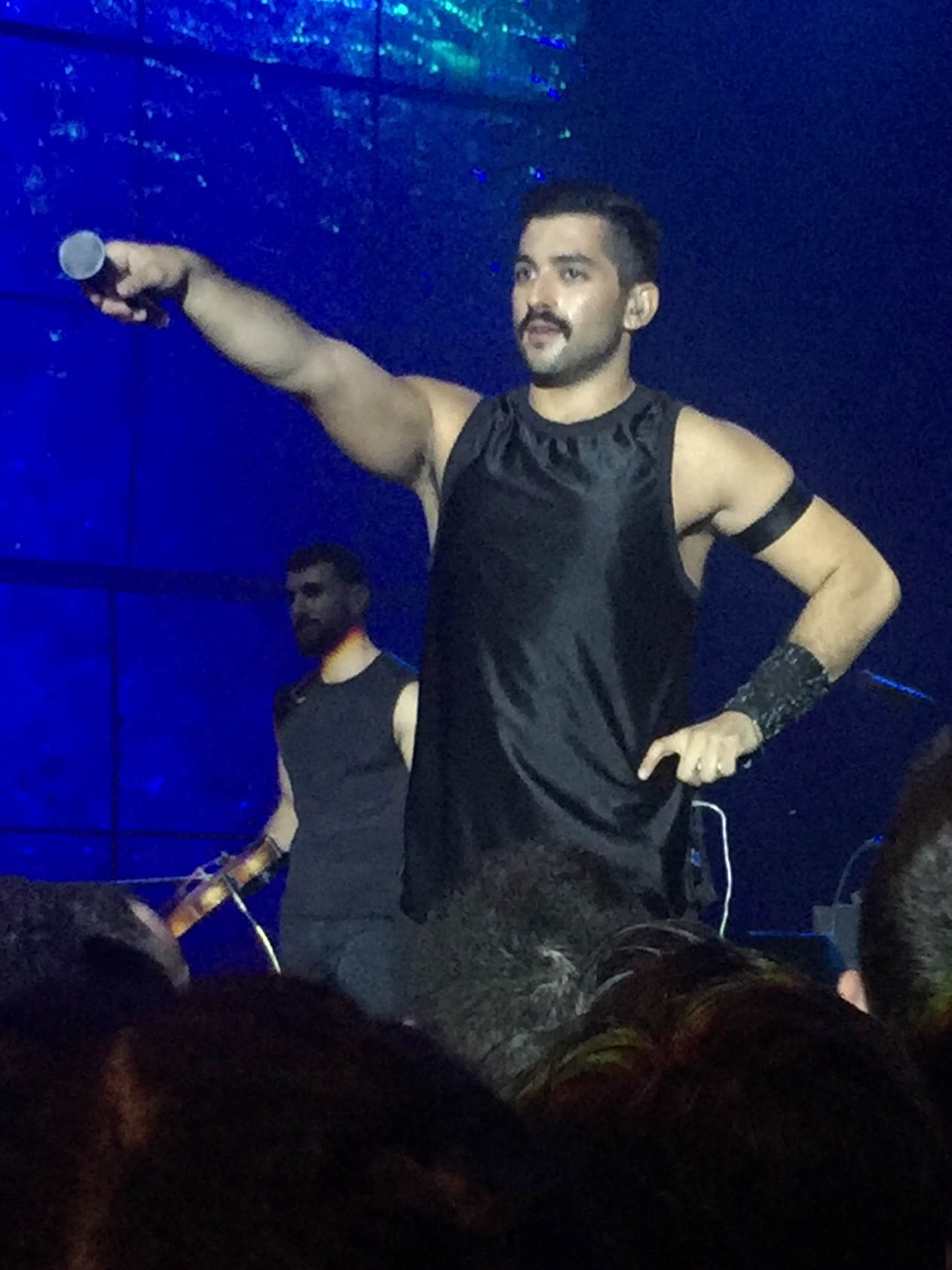
- Sinno in Ehden, Lebanon, 2017

Background information
- Born: April 25, 1988 (age 38); Beirut, Lebanon
- Occupations: Singer; songwriter
- Formerly of: Mashrou' Leila

Hamed Sinno (Arabic: حامد سنّو; born April 25, 1988) is a Lebanese-American musician and writer. They were the lead singer of the alternative rock band Mashrou' Leila until the group disbanded in 2022.

== Early life and education ==
Sinno was born to a Lebanese father who had lived in the United States and a Jordanian mother who had lived between Morocco and Rome. They have American citizenship.

Sinno grew up in an Anglophone household. They attended the American Community School of Beirut (ACS) and graduated "not knowing how to properly speak Arabic", mostly learning Arabic as they wrote songs. Sinno did not learn to read music nor did they have formal musical training. However, they sang in the school choir.

While studying at the American University of Beirut, Sinno came out. There Sinno also began to experiment with subversive graffiti as a form of self-expression before getting involved with Mashrou' Leila.

== Career ==
Sinno co-founded Mashrou' Leila in 2008 while studying graphic design at the American University of Beirut, when responding to an open jam session call put out by Andre Chedid, Omaya Malaeb, and Haig Papazian.

According to Sinno, their parents initially disapproved of their career in music, fearing for their financial prospects and physical safety due to the band's controversial reputation.

After Mashrou' Leila disbanded, Sinno earned an MA in Digital musics from Dartmouth College.

Today, Sinno performs under both their full name "Hamed Sinno" and "H.Sinno".

== In the media ==
Sinno has been featured on the cover of several magazines, including France's Têtu, Jordan's My.Kali, and UK-based Attitude. They also appeared on the cover of the Middle East edition of Rolling Stone magazine as part of Mashrou' Leila.

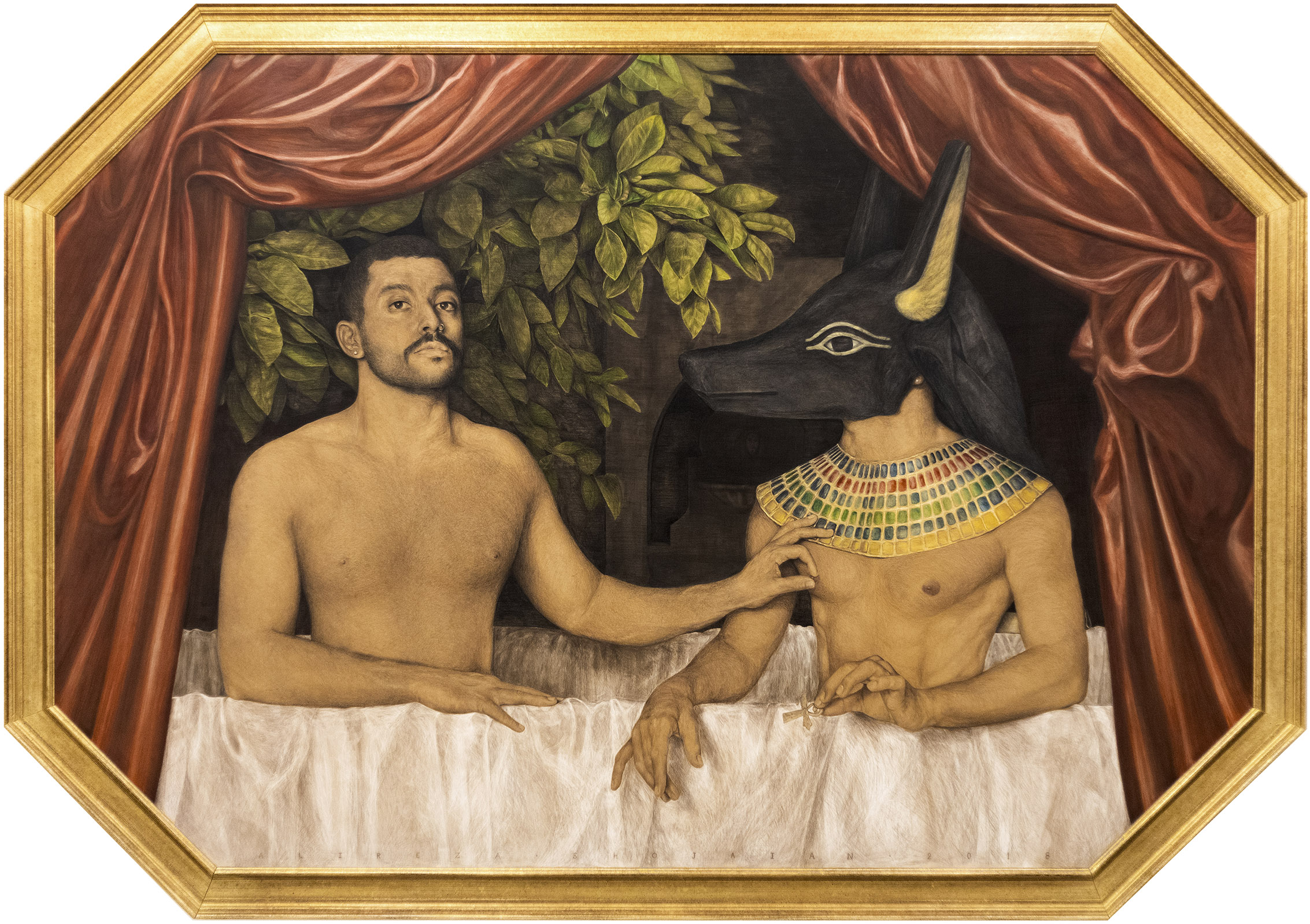
Hamed Sinno et un de ses fréres, a 2017 painting by Iranian artist and visual activist Alireza Shojaian.

Sinno figured in a painting by the Iranian artist Alireza Shojaian dubbed Hamed Sinno et un de ses fréres. In the painting Sinno is depicted pinching the nipple of Anubis, the ancient Egyptian god of funerary rites. Anubis sports a rainbow colored Usekh collar alluding to the pride flag. The work references and draws inspiration from a painting by an unknown painter, titled Gabrielle d'Estrées et une de ses sœurs, that depicts the mistress of Henry IV of France. The collaboration with Sinno was a statement against systematic state-led persecution of LGBT minorities in Egypt. Shojaian painted the piece after the September 22, 2017, Mashrou' Leila concert in Cairo, during which the pride flag was flown. The Cairo pride flag incident resulted in the arrest of a number of concert-goers, including Sarah Hegazi, who died by suicide while self-exiled in Canada after having experienced traumatic incarceration and mistreatment in Egypt. Shojaian paid tribute to Hegazi in a 2020 interview.

They were arrested in 2024 for throwing artificial blood during a Pride Demonstration in New York with activists from Queers for Palestine.

== Works ==
=== With Mashrou' Leila ===
- Mashrou' Leila (2009)
- El Hal Romancy (2011)
- Raasük (2013)
- Ibn El Leil (2015)
- The Beirut School (2019)

=== Solo music ===
- Poems of Consumption (2023), "a song cycle built on poetry published in Amazon customer reviews" which debuted at the Barbican Theater in London in July 2023
- Westerly Breath (2024), a full-length opera developed at The Industry Los Angeles which debuted at the Met Museum in New York City in January 2024

=== Writing ===
Essays by Sinno have appeared in the following books:

- This Arab Is Queer (2022), edited by Elias Jahshan
- The Queer Arab Glossary (2024), edited by Marwan Kaabour

== Personal life ==
Sinno is gay and non-binary, and advocates for LGBT rights in the Middle East and around the world. They lectured at and graduated from Dartmouth College in New Hampshire. Sinno uses they/them, she/her, and he/him pronouns.

According to a September 2024 Instagram story, Sinno has ADHD.
