= Mashrou' Leila =

Lebanese indie rock and alternative rock band

Mashrou' Leila مشروع ليلى
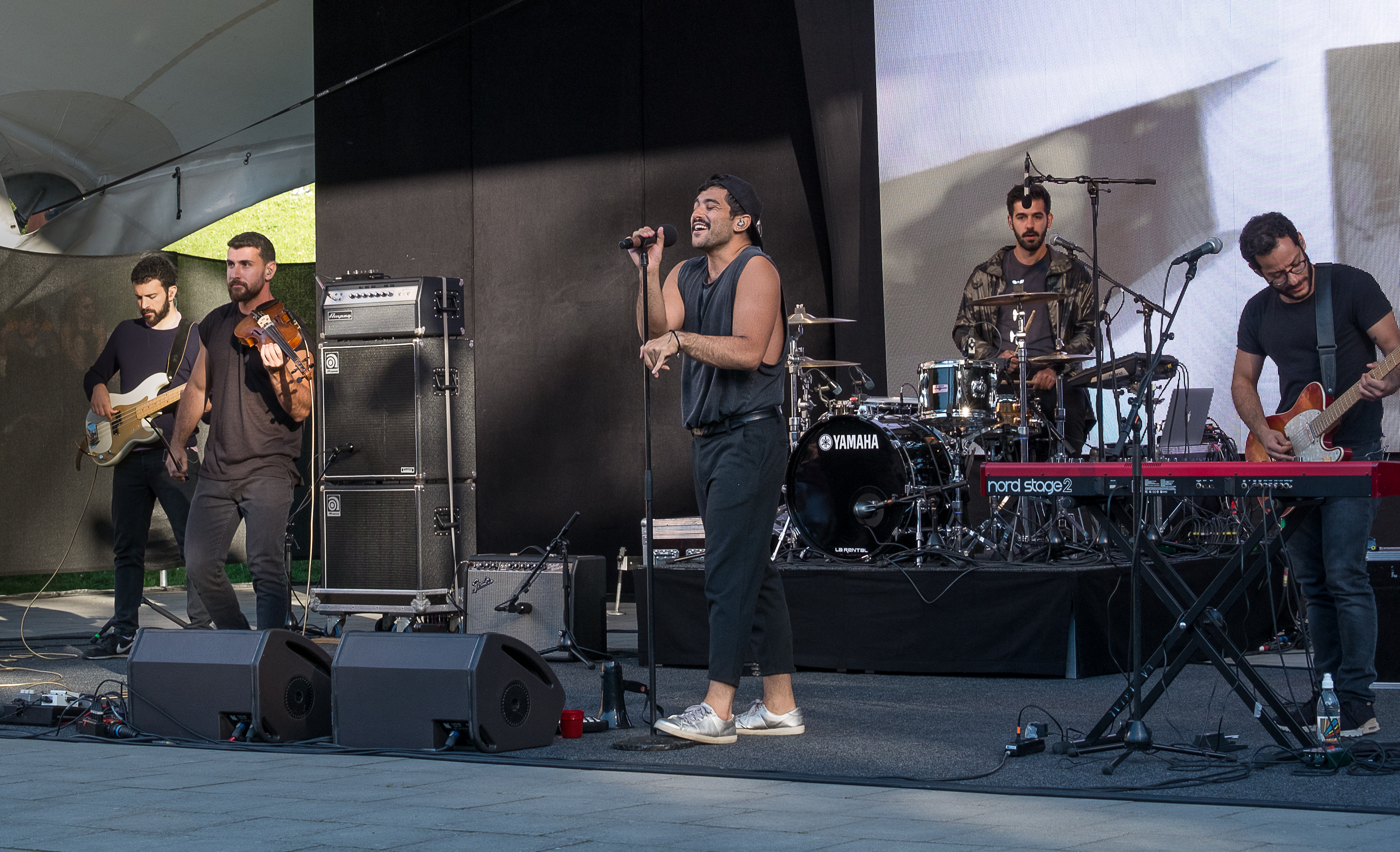
- Mashrou' Leila at a concert in Pildammsparken, Malmö, July 2017.

Background information
- Origin: Beirut, Lebanon
- Genre: Indie rock
- Years active: 2008–2022
- Past members: Hamed Sinno; Haig Papazian; Carl Gerges; Firas Abou Fakher; Andre Chedid; Omaya Malaeb; Ibrahim Badr

Mashrou' Leila (Arabic: مشروع ليلى, romanized: Mashrūʿ Laylā, Lebanese Arabic pronunciation: [maʃˈruːʕ ˈlajla]), sometimes transliterated in Arabizi as Mashrou3 Leila or translated as "project of one night", was a four-member indie rock band from Beirut, Lebanon. It was formed in 2008 as a music workshop at the American University of Beirut, and released four studio albums: Mashrou' Leila (2009), Raasük (2013), Ibn El Leil (2015) and The Beirut School (2019), as well as an EP, El Hal Romancy (2011). The band attracted controversy due to their satirical lyrics and themes. The band disbanded in 2022, due to harassment and hate campaigns.

== History ==
=== Formation and name ===
The band was formed in February 2008 at the American University of Beirut, when violinist Haig Papazian, guitarist Andre Chedid, and pianist Omaya Malaeb posted an open invitation to musicians looking to jam to vent the stress caused by college and the unstable political situation. Out of the dozen of people who answered the call, seven would remain to form Mashrou' Leila. Band members were encouraged by friends to perform in front of a live crowd; they put on a show as the opening act for a concert on the AUB campus. During the event, Mashrou' Leila proved to be the only band that composed and performed their original compositions. The band continued to play small venues and gain ground on the underground music circuit until they emerged onto the indie music scene during the Lebanese 2008 Fête de la Musique event (the yearly Music festival held by the Beirut municipality) sparking controversy for their unabashed and critical lyrics on Lebanese society, failed love, sexuality, and politics.

Mashrou' Leila's members enjoy the wordplay and ambiguity surrounding their band's name. In English, the name can be interpreted as either "One Night Project" or "Leila's Project", Leila (written as ليلى) being a very common given name in Lebanon and (written as ليلة) the Arabic word for 'night'. When asked during an early interview about the origin of the name Mashrou' Leila, band members teasingly retorted that the band is a project started to collect money for a girl they knew called Leila. According to the band's official Facebook page, however, Mashrou' Leila means "An Overnight Project", named for the nocturnal nature of the project characterized by all-night jam sessions.

=== Mashrou' Leila ===
In 2009, Mashrou’ Leila participated at Radio Liban's Modern Music Contest held at Basement (club) winning both the jury and popular awards in part due to their breakthrough single "Raksit Leila" (Leila's Dance). The first prize was a record deal. Mashrou' Leila's self-titled debut album produced by B-root Productions (established by Raed El Khazen and Jana Saleh) was released in December 2009 at a steel factory in Bourj Hammoud (a suburb of Beirut) where an unprecedented number of attendees crowded the factory yard. The gig turned out to be Beirut's biggest non-mainstream event in recent years and has been a big hit among indie and rock fans in Lebanon. The album cemented a reputation for the band that no topic is off limits with songs including "Shim El Yasmine" (شم الياسمين) about homosexual lovers, "Fasateen" about sectarian and religious differences that prevent young lovers from being together as well as "Ubwa" about Lebanon's political instability and the influence of religion in all facets of society. Shortly after the release of their first album, the band burst into the spotlight of the Lebanese music mainstream when they were announced to be headlining the Byblos International Festival on July 9, 2010. The concert was one of the most anticipated events of the summer and was attended by scores of fans as well as the Lebanese prime minister Saad Hariri.

=== El Hal Romancy ===
In 2011, Mashrou' Leila released the El Hal Romancy EP, a recording the band describes as "tackling lyrically more intimate, personal, and theatrical subject matter that is less about the city and its politics proper, and more about the social residue of the city. This is a collection of songs that happen in a weathered bedroom with ruffled bed sheets, stained carpeting, and a book shelf of references, while a string section plays on a rusty vinyl player to a couple of young lovers trying to survive the city". One week before the release concert in Beirut Hippodrome, Mashrou' Leila announced that the album was available for free download on the band's website.

In 2012, the band headlined Baalbeck International Festival. The concert was filmed and released as a live concert.

=== Raasuk ===
Mashrou' Leila's anticipated 3rd release Raasuk (shown on artwork as رقّصوك) was recorded at Hotel2Tango in Montreal, Quebec, Canada. It was described as "an arresting, heady mixture of retro-Beirut music – the signature sound being Haig Papazian's razor-sharp violin". The album was released in August 2013. The video of the lead single "Lil Watan" (للوطن, 'for the nation') was awarded the gold prize at the Dubai Lynx 2015 festival. To promote the album, the band managed to crowd fund over $60,000; an unprecedented feat for a Middle East art project. On April 6, Mashrou' Leila became the first Middle Eastern artist to be featured on the cover of Rolling Stone magazine.

On November 25, 2013, Mashrou' Leila played the Red Bull Soundclash with Who Killed Bruce Lee in the Forum de Beyrouth. During a show at The Middle East club in Boston, Sinno introduced "Abdo" off the Raasuk release by explaining that, "This one is about something typical in Beirut which is people selling stuff on trolleys in the street. It’s about a flower salesman called Abdo."

=== Ibn El Leil ===
The first hint of new material arrived when the band started a campaign asking the members of their social media pages to submit lyrics and video ideas to be incorporated in the band's upcoming single. "3 Minutes" (3 دقائق) was released on March 17, 2015.

Contrary to their common method of writing and producing songs, the band decided not to test their new material in live concerts, opting instead for secrecy and mystery about their fourth album. The band recorded the 13 tracks in studio La Frette in France over the summer with French-Lebanese producer Samy Osta, and worked on orchestral and brass arrangements with the Macedonian Radio Orchestra in F.A.M.E's Studios in Macedonia. The band has said that this album is their most pop album to date, and deals with topics that range from the euphoric to the destructive and depressive, all taking place in the politically, socially, and sexually charged spaces of Beirut's night.

The band experimented with drum machines, loops, samples, and several synthesizers in a new method of composition, trying to accommodate for the departure of keyboard player Omaya Malaeb. "Maghawir" (مغاوير) narrates a possible version of a club shooting in Beirut, drawing on references to real Lebanese case histories from two different shootings that took place within the same week, both of which resulted in the deaths of extremely young victims, each of whom was out celebrating their birthday." During a show in Boston, the band explained that the song "Tayf (Ghost)" (طيف) is about a shuttered gay club, and "Bint Elkhandaq" (بنت الخندق) tells the story of a friend who learned, "as hard as it is to be a woman in Beirut, it’s just as hard to be brown in the West."

The album is heavily loaded with allusions and references, both to contemporary figures of pop, and to mythological figures of gods and demons.

On November 28, the band released Ibn El Leil (ابن الليل, 'son of the night') at the Barbican in London with live broadcasting on MTV Lebanon available to the entire world to positive reviews. "In the seven years since Mashrou’ Leila formed at the American University of Beirut, the quintet – whose name, in fact, means 'overnight project' – have won comparisons to everyone from Arctic Monkeys and Radiohead to Roxy Music and Wild Beasts."

On December 1, Ibn El Leil debuted at the number one spot on local iTunes channels, and charted as number 11 on the international world Billboard charts. "It’s such an impressive performance that stadiums seem not only possible but imminent."

The band released a music video for their single "Roman" on July 19, 2017. The single was included on the deluxe version of Ibn El Leil released July 21, 2017.

=== The Beirut School ===
On February 8, 2019, Mashrou' Leila released a new single, "Cavalry", the first from their upcoming album The Beirut School. The Beirut School was released on March 1, 2019. The album includes some songs from the group's previous album. The group toured North America in 2019 in support of the album.

=== Disbanding ===
In September 2022, Sinno announced on an episode of Sarde After Dinner that the band would be disbanding. Sinno cited harassment and hate campaigns as a reason for the band breaking up. They also cited the tragic death of Sarah Hegazi, who was arrested and tortured in Egypt after flying a rainbow flag at a 2017 concert, as a contributing factor to the decision.

== Members ==
- Hamed Sinno as the lead vocalist.
- Haig Papazian on the violin
- Carl Gerges on drums
- Firas Abou Fakher on guitar and keyboards
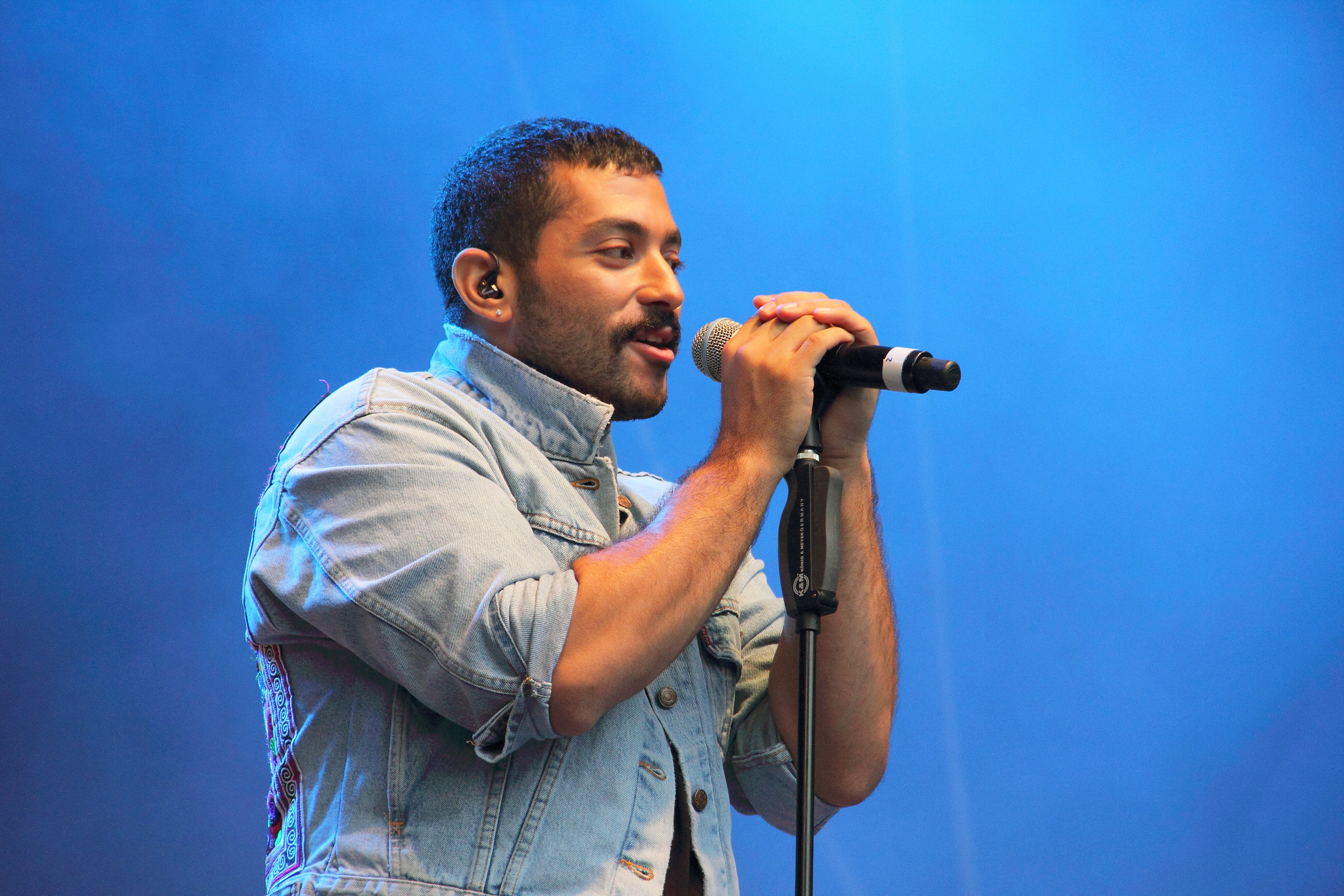
Hamed Sinno

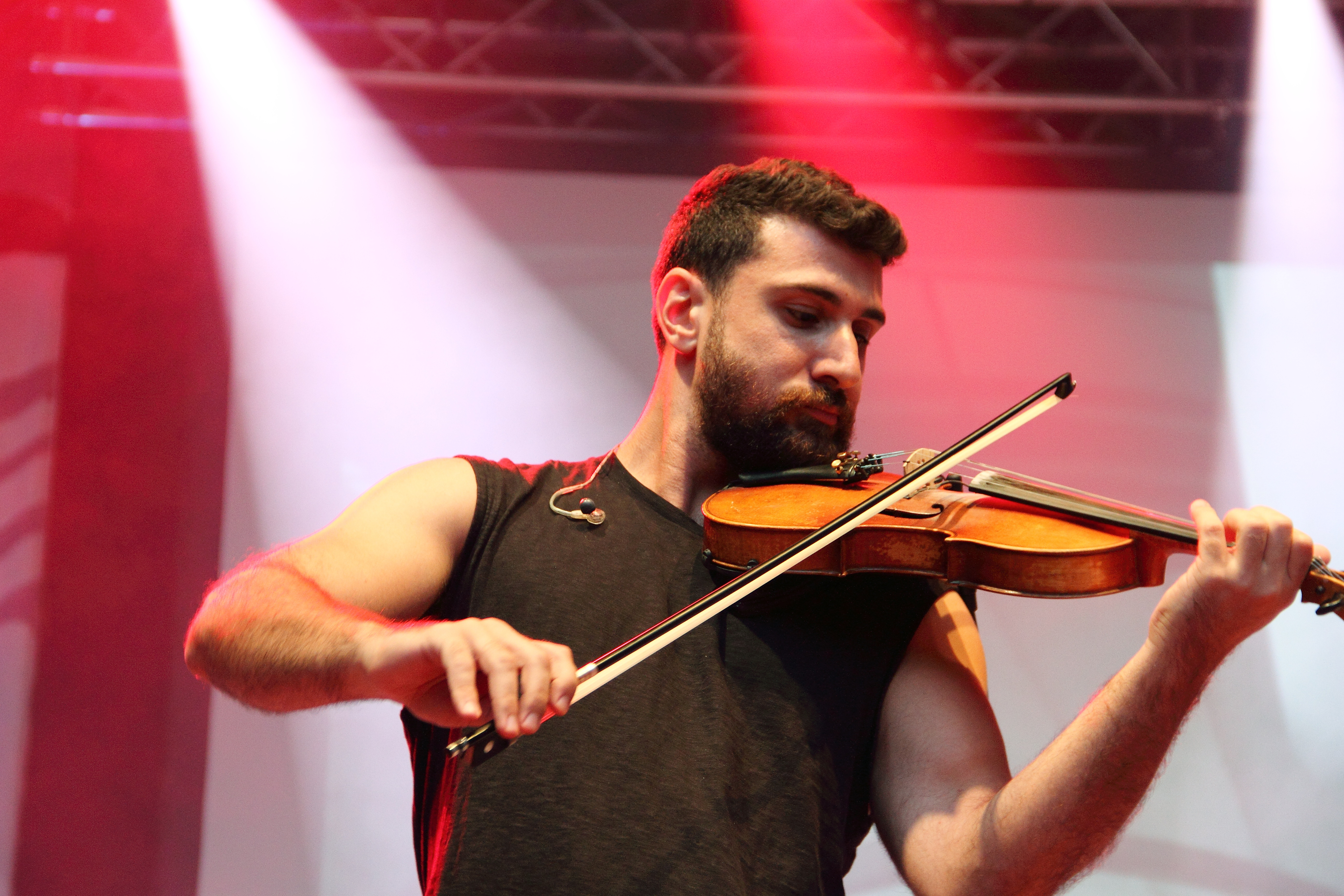
Haig Papazian

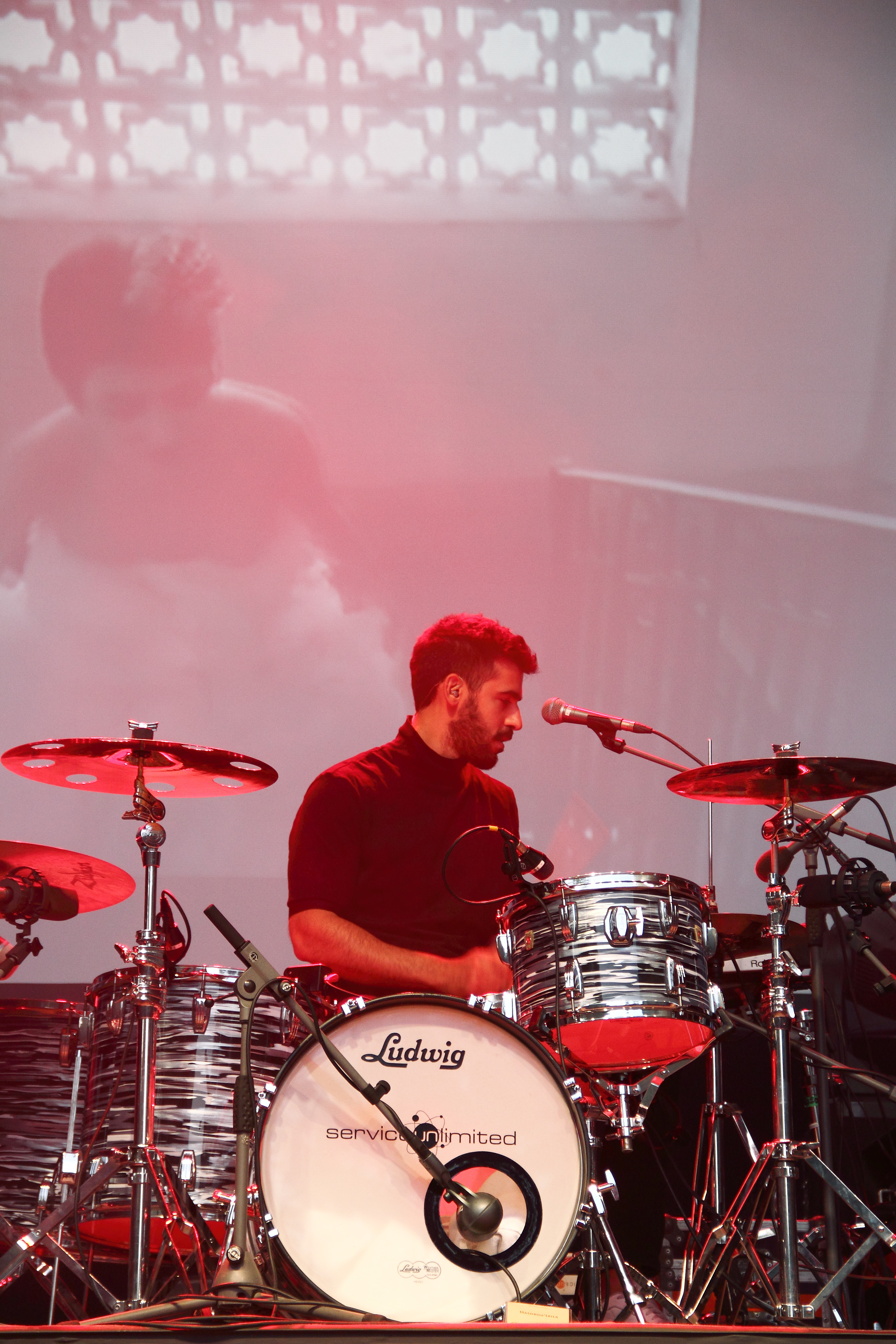
Carl Gerges

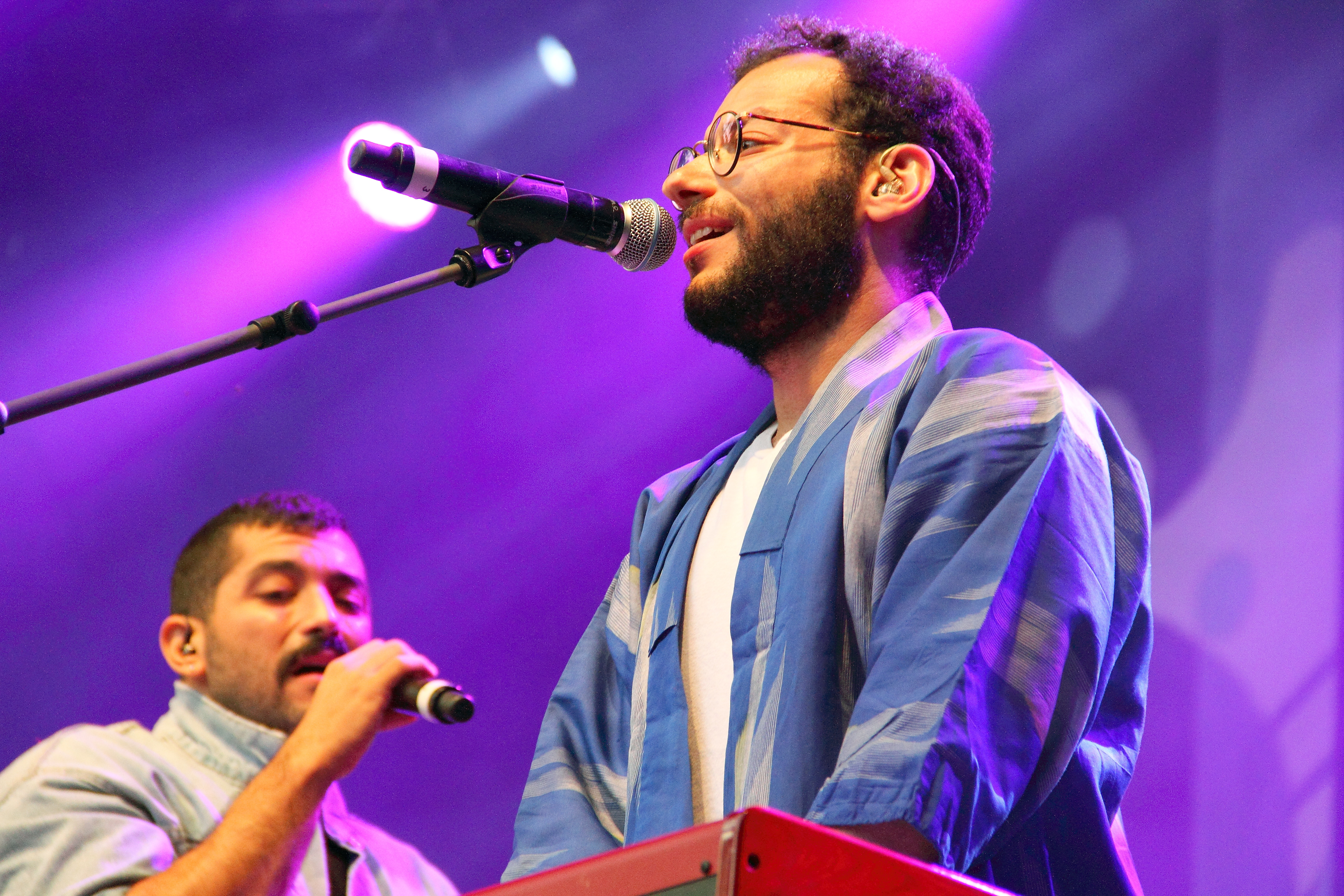
Firas Abou Fakher

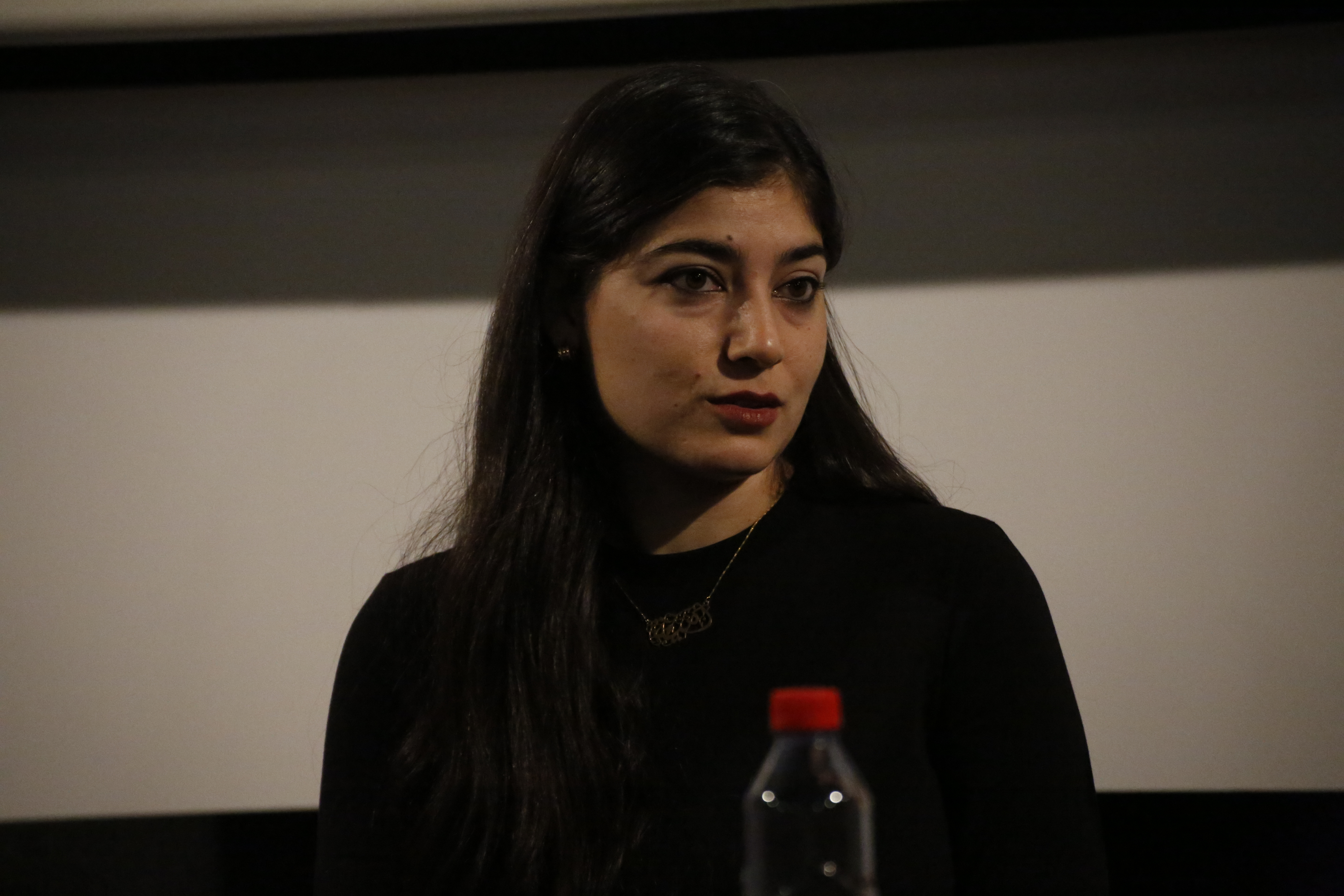
Omaya Malaeb

=== Former members ===
- Ibrahim Badr on bass guitar
- Omaya Malaeb on keyboards
- Andre Chedid on guitars

== Musical style and themes ==
Mashrou’ Leila's themes and satirical Lebanese lyrics reflect the many faces and flaws of Lebanese society which are not addressed by mainstream Arabic music. The band is critical of the problems associated with life in Beirut and they are known for their liberal use of swear-words in some of their songs. Their debut album's nine songs discuss subject matters such as lost love, war, politics, security and political assassination, materialism, immigration and homosexuality. "Latlit" one of the Mashrou' Leila album tracks is a caricature of the Lebanese society overridden by gossip. "Shim el Yasmine" (literally Smell the Jasmine), a song reminiscent of Jay Brannan's "Housewife", was described as an ode to tolerance for same-sex love where a young man wants to introduce his bride to his parents but the bride turns out to be a groom. "Fasateen" (literally meaning "dresses") is a ballad that discusses the issue of interfaith or inter-religious marriage, a growing phenomenon in Lebanon. The song's music video shows the band members deconstructing nuptial symbols and defying the pressure of romantic relationships. Some of the distinctive features of the band's music is the prominence of the violin in passages redolent of Armenian folk music and the use of a megaphone in some songs to alter lead vocalist Hamed Sinno's voice. They continued tackling social issues in their later albums, with their fourth album featuring songs such as "Kalam", which addressed issues of gender identity, while "Bint Elkhandaq" addressed misogyny in the Middle East as well as Islamophobia in the West.

== Media image ==
Hamed Sinno got their first solo magazine theater cover in 2012 when he fronted the December issue of the first LGBTQI magazine in the MENA region, My.Kali. Hamed was also featured on the cover of October 2013 issue of French gay magazine Têtu. The interview in this issue was titled "On peut poursuivre son rêve après son coming out", literally 'You can pursue your dream after coming out'. Papazian fronted the December 2013 My.Kali issue. Carl Gerges landed his first solo cover on the November issue of L'Officiel Hommes-Levant, 2013.

=== Controversy ===
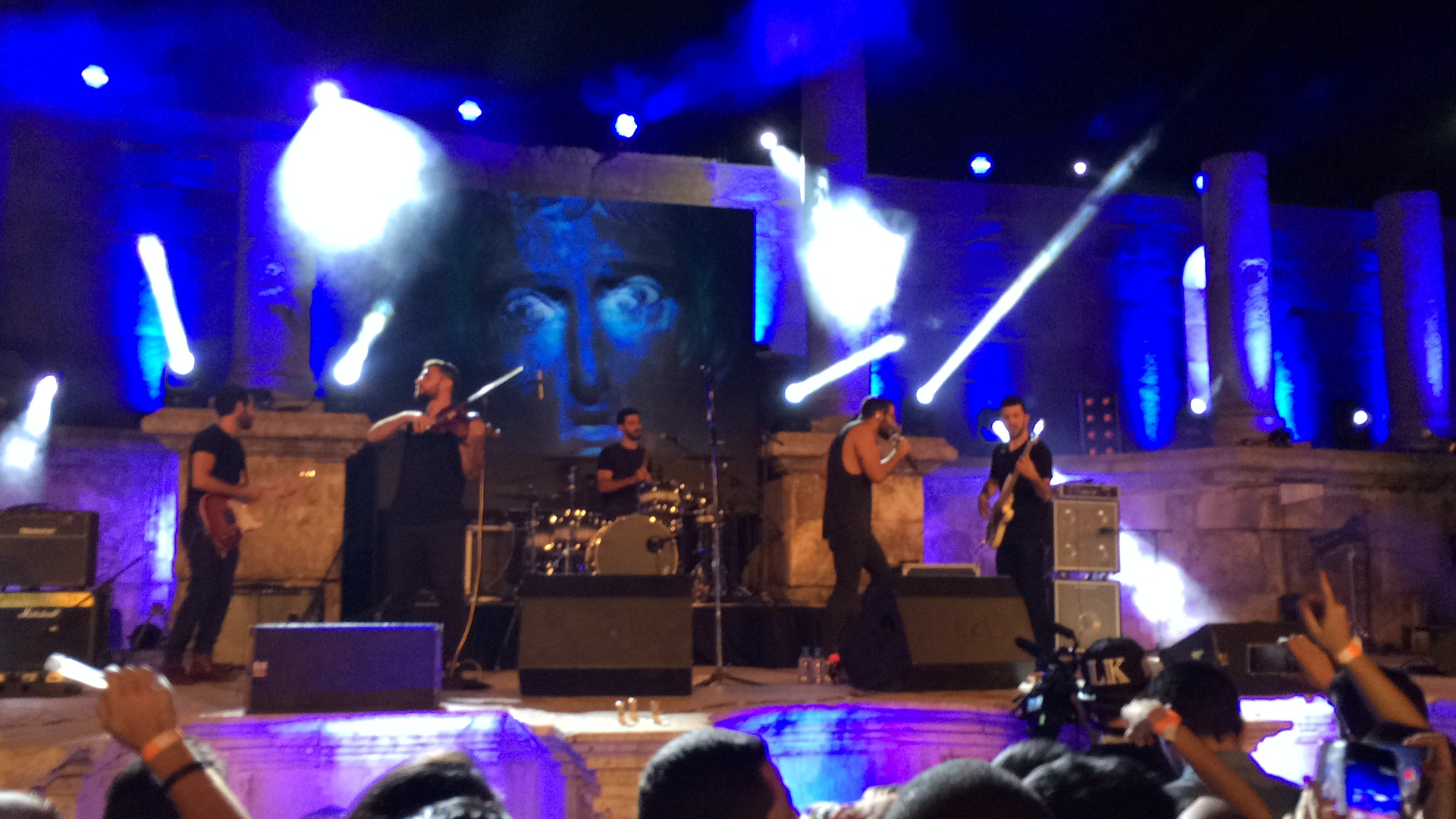
Mashrou' Leila at the Roman theater in Amman, Jordan August 2015

In August 2010, during a concert at the Byblos Festival, the band's lead Hamed Sinno unfurled a rainbow flag that was handed to him by a member of the audience. This was the first public display of a gay pride flag by an artist in Lebanon. During that same festival appearance, the band performed songs denouncing police brutality and corrupt politicians while then prime minister Saad el-Din Hariri was in attendance.

Mashrou' Leila's satirical lyrics and themes regarding politics, religion, sexuality and homosexuality led to an unofficial ban on performing in Jordan on April 26, 2016. The band announced on its Facebook page that their planned concert was denied approval by the Amman Governorate. The ban was reverted by the relevant authorities two days later. On June 13, 2016, the band again posted a message on their official Facebook page that claimed their upcoming concert in Amman had been cancelled by the Jordanian Ministry of the Interior: "The inconsistency of the Jordanian authorities in this respect (inviting us, then banning, then cancelling the ban, then inviting us again, then banning us again - all within the course of 14 months - has culminated in a clear message, that the Jordanian authorities do not intend to separate Jordan from the fanatical conservatism that has contributed in making the region increasingly toxic over the last decade."

In September 2017, while the band was playing in Egypt, members of their audience were arrested for unfurling rainbow flags in support of LGBT rights. In total seven concert attendees were arrested, including Sarah Hegazi; one of the arrested men was sentenced to six years in jail for 'practicing debauchery' on his way home from the concert.

=== Byblos Festival concert cancellation ===
The band was set to play at the Byblos Festival on August 9, 2019; a few weeks before the concert, local church officials called for the show to be cancelled amidst an online homophobic campaign by right wing Christian activists who claimed that the band songs are blasphemous and promote homosexuality. Two song in particular, "Djin" and "Idols", were cited as violating Christian sensitivities. During a 2016 NPR Tiny Desk Concert, the band lead singer Hamed Sinno explained the "Djin" lyrics as drawing from scholar Joseph Campbell's comparative mythology and religion works. The song references parallels in Christian and Greek Dionysian mythology but the crux of the songs is about "getting [...] messed up at a bar".

On July 17, 2019, protesters against the gig began to circulate conspiracy theories claiming the band is a "Masonic-Zionist" project to morally corrupt Lebanon, citing the band's support of gay and transgender rights. Right wing social media activists circulated an image shared by the band's lead singer on their personal Facebook account in 2015 depicting a Byzantine icon of the Virgin Mary with the singer Madonna's head in place of Mary's. They accused the band of devil worship and rallied priests and politicians in their bid to stop the concert. Some campaigners, including Free Patriotic Movement official Naji Hayek, called on their followers to forcibly stop the band's appearance if Lebanese authorities didn't cancel the show. Sinno posted a reply denouncing the mounting sectarian and fundamentalist rhetoric and explained that the Madonna image is a cover of a Facebook article discussing pop art they shared and deleted in 2015; they added that they neither drew the image nor wrote its caption.

Senior clergyman and head of the Catholic Media Center Abdo Abou Kasm said that the church was prepared to take legal action against the band and that he contacted members of parliament and other Christian officials, and informed them that this concert poses a "danger to [our] community," adding "We won’t let this go through." On July 22 the Maronite Catholic Eparchy of Byblos issued its first call to cancel the concert. Members of the band and prospective festival audience members received a flurry of threats of violence and death on social media.

In an attempt to defuse the situation, a Byblos Festival spokesperson claimed that a compromise was reached and that the concert would be held if the band members held a press conference to apologize to those who might have been offended and pulled the two offending songs from the festival set.

Lawyer Christiane Nakhoul filed a lawsuit on behalf of a right-wing activist against Mashrou' Leila for "insulting sanctities and religions and stirring sectarian sentiments." On July 24, 2019, Mount Lebanon Prosecutor Ghada Aoun ordered the release of the band members after their interrogation by the State Security agency dismissing charges of blasphemy and inciting sectarian strife offenses. The prosecutor added that those members who were outside Lebanon (Sinno) can return because there was no memo against them. Lebanese singer Marcel Khalife who was himself the target of a libel campaign earlier voiced his support and called his followers to rally behind the band.

On July 29, 2019, the Maronite Catholic Eparchy of Byblos shared on its Facebook page a statement by the Episcopal Commission for Social Communication claiming that two of the band members had acknowledged, during a meeting with church officials, that some of the band's songs violated religious values. The statement added that the band members who were questioned agreed to remove content that was deemed disrespectful to religious sensitivities and to issue an apology. On that same day, supporters of the band rallied in downtown Beirut, despite attempts by Christian clergymen and right-wing groups to stop the concert.

On July 30, 2019, the Byblos Festival organizers caved in to pressure from online groups, church officials and politicians and announced the cancellation of the show to prevent civil unrest and bloodshed.

On July 31, 2019, following the concert cancellation, Mashrou' Leila shared a statement on its social media accounts condemning the campaign, saying that the songs at the center of the controversy were subjected to "misinterpretation and twisting of lyrics". The band added: "We have been tried on the streets, judged and convicted by anyone wishing. This is a departure from the logic of the state, one that strikes at the core of our sense of our safety and ability to be artistic and creative." Social activist Khaled Merheb filed a lawsuit against members of the right wing campaign group who threatened the band and attendees with the use of weapons, beatings and killing. On August 1, 2019, the Byblos Festival filed another lawsuit against individuals involved in threatening the band and the public with violence.

In the aftermath of the concert cancellation, a number of human rights organizations voiced concern. Lama Fakih, the Middle East director at Human Rights Watch said: “The cancellation of Mashrou’ Leila's concert reflects the government's increased reliance on over-broad and abusive laws to stifle and censor activists, journalists, and artists.” Amnesty International denounced the church position and hate speech against vulnerable populations: “It is unconscionable that there continue to be such calls emanating from institutions that are meant to serve as role models to their constituencies, and can and should be upholding the right to freedom of expression and protection of vulnerable groups, instead of enabling hate speech, including homophobia".

On August 4, 2019, Dutch metal band Within Temptation who was set to perform at Byblos on August 7 pulled out of the festival in solidarity with Mashrou Leila and "in support of tolerance, freedom of speech and expression". The cancellation of the Mashrou Leila concert triggered protests and a solidarity campaign on social media. Supporters described the cancellation as a shameful and dangerous precedent. On the date of the concert, independent activists gathered to put on a show in solidarity with the band and against censorship under the banner “The Sound of Music Is Louder.” The event gathered dozens of sympathetic musicians, bands and comedians at 'The Palace' venue in Beirut's Hamra district. Over a thousand people attended the show while hundreds waited in droves at the venue's entrance in waiting. At 9pm, pubs and restaurants across the city played Mashrou' Leila songs in solidarity with the band. On August 24, 2019, cellist Yo-Yo Ma played Tayf at the end of his Byblos festival concert as a tribute to the band.

=== Northwestern University in Qatar Cancelation ===
Mashrou’ Leila were invited for a discussion session titled, “Language and the Rhythm of the Street” at The Media Majlis in Northwestern University in Qatar. The event was reported to be sold-out, before hashtag #نرفض_محاضرة_مشروع_ليلى (we refuse Mashrou' Leila's discussion) being circulated on Twitter. Shortly after the hashtag, Northwestern University and the band decided to cancel the event for safety concerns.

The university's student publication, The Daily Q, reported that the session would be relocated to NU's home campus in Evanston, Illinois. The article mentions that “the provost’s office in Evanston, the band and NU-Q both felt that because of security and safety reasons concerning the band, the change was appropriate."

A spokesperson from Qatar Foundation, told Reuters that “we also place the very highest value on academic freedom… in the context of Qatari laws as well as the country’s cultural and social customs. This particular event was canceled due to the fact that it patently did not correlate with this context.” This led to people questioning if the cancelation was a mutual decision or if it was pressurized from the Qatar Foundation, as the relocation of the event to the United States has never taken place.

== Discography ==
=== Studio albums ===
All tracks are written by Mashrou' Leila.

Mashrou' Leila (2009)
| No. | Title | Length |
|---|---|---|
| 1. | "Fasateen" | 3:03 |
| 2. | "Obwa" | 3:30 |
| 3. | "Min el Taboor" | 3:28 |
| 4. | "'Al Hajiz" | 3:32 |
| 5. | "Shim el Yasmine" | 5:10 |
| 6. | "Im-Bim-Billilah" | 2:32 |
| 7. | "Latlit" | 3:06 |
| 8. | "Khaleeha Zikra" | 4:18 |
| 9. | "Raksit Leila" | 8:43 |
| Total length: | | 38:09 |

El Hal Romancy (2011)
| No. | Title | Length |
|---|---|---|
| 1. | "El Moukadima" | 2:03 |
| 2. | "Habibi" | 3:43 |
| 3. | "Inni Mnih" | 3:23 |
| 4. | "Imm El Jacket" | 3:00 |
| 5. | "Wajih" | 3:30 |
| 6. | "El Hal Romancy" | 3:45 |
| Total length: | | 19:33 |

Raasük (2013)
| No. | Title | Length |
|---|---|---|
| 1. | "Prologue" | 1:20 |
| 2. | "Abdo" | 3:17 |
| 3. | "Ala Babu" | 4:36 |
| 4. | "Taxi" | 2:44 |
| 5. | "Skandar Maalouf" | 4:01 |
| 6. | "Lil Watan" | 3:36 |
| 7. | "Bishuf" | 4:33 |
| 8. | "Ma Tetrikini Heik" | 2:26 |
| 9. | "Raasük" | 4:02 |
| 10. | "Wa Nueid" | 5:05 |
| 11. | "Bahr" | 3:27 |
| Total length: | | 39:12 |

Ibn El Leil (2015)
| No. | Title | Length |
|---|---|---|
| 1. | "Aoede" | 4:37 |
| 2. | "3 Minutes" | 4:20 |
| 3. | "Djin" | 3:17 |
| 4. | "Icarus" | 4:38 |
| 5. | "Maghawir" | 5:31 |
| 6. | "Kalam (S/He)" | 4:06 |
| 7. | "Tayf (Ghost)" | 4:28 |
| 8. | "Falyakon" | 4:43 |
| 9. | "Bint Elkhandaq" | 3:27 |
| 10. | "Asnam (Idols)" | 3:09 |
| 11. | "Sadalsuud" | 1:55 |
| 12. | "Ashabi" | 5:10 |
| 13. | "Marrikh" | 4:25 |
| Total length: | | 53:46 |

The Beirut School (2019)
| No. | Title | Length |
|---|---|---|
| 1. | "Ashabi" | 5:11 |
| 2. | "Cavalry" | 3:12 |
| 3. | "Lil Watan" | 3:38 |
| 4. | "Radio Romance" | 4:04 |
| 5. | "Aoede" | 4:37 |
| 6. | "Taxi" | 2:45 |
| 7. | "El Mouqadima" | 2:16 |
| 8. | "Fasateen" | 3:03 |
| 9. | "Raksit Leila" | 1:55 |
| 10. | "Shim El Yasmine" | 5:15 |
| 11. | "Inni Mneeh" | 3:04 |
| 12. | "Salam - Paris Version" (Vocals by Róisín Murphy) | 4:04 |
| 13. | "3 Minutes" | 4:18 |
| 14. | "Roman" | 3:42 |
| Total length: | | 43:04 |

=== Live albums ===
| Title | Album details | |
| Title | Album details | Peak chart positions |
|---|---|---|
| Live in Baalbeck | Released: May 7, 2013; Label: Abbout Productions; Format: DVD | |

== Awards and nominations ==
| Year | Award | Nomination | Work | Result | Ref. |
|---|---|---|---|---|---|
| 2013 | Social Media Awards Beirut | Best Band on Social Media | Mashrou' Leila | Won | |
| 2014 | World Music Awards | World's Best Live Act | Mashrou' Leila | Nominated | |
| 2014 | World Music Awards | World's Best Group | Mashrou' Leila | Nominated | |
| 2014 | World Music Awards | World's Best Album | Raasük | Nominated | |
| 2017 | UK Music Video Awards | Best Alternative Video - International | Roman | Nominated | |
| 2018 | Young Director Awards | Changing The World Frame by Frame | Roman | Won | |
| 2019 | The Lynx Awards | Glass: The Award for Change | An Ode To Arab Feminism | Shortlisted | |
| 2020 | Berlin Commercial Awards | Craft: Casting | Cavalry | Won | |
| 2020 | Berlin Commercial Awards | Best Music Video | Cavalry | Nominated | |
| 2020 | Berlin Commercial Awards | Craft: Direction | Cavalry | Nominated | |
| 2020 | Berlin Commercial Awards | Cultural Impact | Cavalry | Shortlisted | |
| 2020 | Prix Club des Directeurs Artistique (Rouge Prix) | New Talent | Radio Romance | Won | |
| 2020 | Prix Club des Directeurs Artistique | Realization Animation | Radio Romance | Shortlisted | |
| 2020 | Prix Club des Directeurs Artistique | Animation 2D | Radio Romance | Nominated | |
| 2020 | Prix Club des Directeurs Artistique | Mounting | Cavalry | Shortlisted | |
| 2020 | Prix Club des Directeurs Artistique | Design & Realization | Cavalry | Nominated | |
