= Ahmed Amin =

Egyptian comedian, actor, and writer

- أحمد أمين
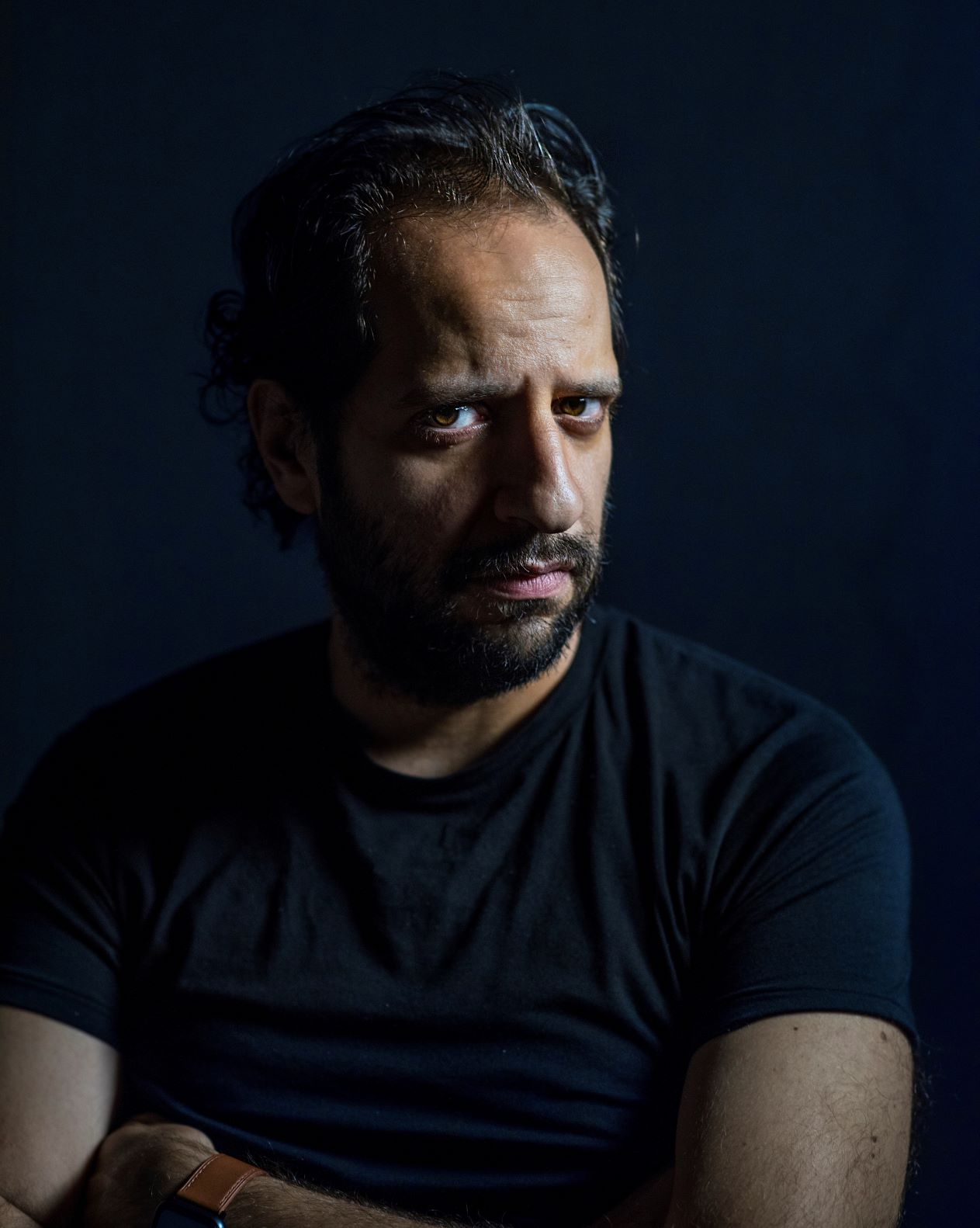
- Born: Ahmed Sayed Amin; 1980 (age 45–46)
- Known for: Acting; Comedy; Improv

Ahmed Sayed Amin (Arabic: أحمد سيد أمين; born in 1980) is an Egyptian actor and comedian. He graduated from the Faculty of Fine Arts, Helwan University in 2002. Amin came to prominence from his online video "30 Sanya" (30 seconds) that went viral among Egyptians on Facebook. His second, and more important step, was the Al Plateau TV show. 2019, came up with his successful TV show Amin and partners. Amin started in Netflix's first-ever Egyptian original Paranormal (2020), in the role of Refaat Ismael.

== Early life ==
Born in Kuwait to an Egyptian middle-class working family and raised in Cairo, Amin practiced acting as an amateur from an early age.

== Career ==
Amin began his office career in the field of children literature. He was an editor-in-chief for Bassem, a Saudi kids' magazine, and later, he wrote cartoons, such as Bassant wa Diasty, Qubtan Azzouz, and more, for major Egyptian media-channels. However, after ten years of office work, he decided that he wanted to be an actor.

Amin's first acting project was "30 Sanya," which he filmed himself inside his home and posted to his Facebook and YouTube accounts. This became very popular, and kick-started his second role, hosting the popular local comedy TV show Al Plateau. During Ramadan 2017, Amin made his first appearance as an actor as Semsem in "Al Wassiya". The character had such a good impact that a crowd-sourced gallery was arranged around Semsem's style and props. In 2019, Amin's digital show "Al Familia" was released, which discussed family issues like technology effect on family bonds.

2019 also witnessed the launching of his TV show "Amin and Partners," a sketch-based TV show whose first season consisted of 14 theatrical live shows. Season 2 followed in 2020.

Amin played the lead role of Netflix’s first-ever Egyptian original series, Paranormal, an adaptation of Ahmed Khaled Tawfiq’s popular horror/thriller book series Ma Waraa Al Tabiaa, directed by Amr Salama.

== Social responsibility ==
Amin made several appearances in campaigns that support charity organizations, including Baheya Foundation for Early Detection and Treatment of Breast Cancer.

He was the face of campaigns by the Egyptian Ministry of Health in cooperation with the World Health Organization and UNICEF as part of the "100 Million Healthy Lives" initiative.

Amin also organized a tour through different universities to talk with new generations.

== Works and awards ==
Category	Role	Name	Year
Cartoon series	Writer	Bassant Wa Diasty	2008 - 2011
Cartoon series	Writer	Qubtan Azzouz	2009 - 2011
TV show	Writer	Ruhama'a Bainahum	2011
Short movie	Actor	Hadir Ma'a Al Muttaham	2013
TV show	Host	Al Plateau	2016
Radio series	Voice actor	Papi Sitter	2017
TV series	Guest star	Khalsana Be Sheyaka	2017
Film	Guest star	Al Kenz	2017
TV series	Actor	Al Wassiya	2018
TV show	Actor	Amin & partners	2019
Film	Guest star	The Secret Men's Club	2019
TV series	Guest star	Badal El hadouta 3	2019
Digital show	Host	Al familia	2019
TV show	Actor	Amin & partners	2020
Netflix TV series	Actor	Paranormal	2020
Radio series	Voice actor	Gamal Kazouza	2021
Film	Guest star	Bara El Manhag	2022
TV show	Actor	Jazeret Ghamam	2022

=== Awards ===
- ArabSat Festival Award for Best Comedy Show (2016)
- Arab Producers Union Award for Best Comedy Show (2017)
- Cairo Artwork and Media Mondial For Best Comedy Show (2017)
- Dear Guest 15 th for Best Actor second role award (2018)
- International Hamsa Festival Of Literature And The Arts for best actor on his role in “Jazeret Ghamam” series (2022)
- ADCA Arab Dramas Critics Awards for Best Actor Award for a Second Role (2022)
- NRJ Radio for best actor public vote award (2022)
