= Al Maktab Raqam 19 =

- Author: Sherif Shawki
- Country: Egypt
- Language: Arabic
- Discipline: action series - Police
- Publisher: Modern Arab Association
- Published: 1984-2001
- No. of books: 83

Al Maktab Raqam 19 (Arabic: المكتب رقم 19) (Office Number 19) is a series of novels by Sherif Shawki. It tells the story of a fictional department, called the "Special Operations Department," or "Al Maktab Raqam 19," meaning "Office Number 19." The author writes that the members of this office have obtained the highest level of training that any officer of the police, army, or intelligence anywhere in the world can receive. Among these is the narrator and hero of the series, Mamdouh 'abd al-Wahab. The head of the department is Major General Marad Hamdi, a man well-known for his firmness and determination.

The first stories in the series were published in 1984 along with two other series, Ragol Al Mostaheel “The Man of the Impossible” and Malaf Al Mostakbal “The File of the Future”. Shawki wrote the first story under the title, "Al Infigar Al Maghool," or, "The Unknown Explosion," the plot of which focuses on the aftermath of mysterious explosions.

The series is considered by some to be somewhat childish when compared with others written in a similarly simple style. However, Al Maktab Raqam 19 has enjoyed decent popularity and sales.

== Titles arranged by serial number ==
1. Unknown Explosion

2. Devil's Island

3. Monsters Severed

4. The Curse of the Small King

5. Terrible Earthquake

6. Invaders City

7. Traders Toxins

8. Horror Rocket

9. Hidden Killer

10. Hostage

11. Bloody Revenge

12. Missing Plane

13. Gang Counterfeiters

14. Sniper Hunt

15. Terrible Job

16. Attack Mercenaries

17. Secret Documents

18. Prime Dead

19. Crime Festival

20. Gas Killer

21. Major Operation

22. Jewels Maharaja

23. Killers Club

24. Bat Blue

25. Scorpion's Head

26. Farm Death

27. Duplicity

28. The Island of Horrors

29. Kidnapping Gen.

30. Horror Triangle

31. Diamonds Devil

32. Evil Plant

33. Game of Terrorism

34. Lost Treasure

35. The Black Curse

36. Customer Fugitive

37. Octopus Arm

38. Theft of Invention

39. Challenge the Mafia

40. Devil's Cave

41. Village of Horror

42. Victims of the Devil

43. Smoke Mass

44. The Blue Bag

45. Secret Factory

46. The Fox and the Snake

47. City Baddies

48. A Mysterious Enemy

49. Conflict Spies

50. Sky Danger

51. Golden Crown

52. Client Professional

53. Devil's Palace

54. Aim Invisibility

55. Challenge the Devil

56. Yellow Icon

57. Secret File

58. The Zero Hour

59. Map of Death

60. Secret Organization

61. Ghost Walker

62. Stun Death

63. Fire Ball

64. The Mystery of the Sphinx

65. Dark Rays

66. Conflict in the Bush

67. A Plot of Satan

68. Bulwark

69. Ghost of Revenge

70. Bloody Chase

71. Cursed Earth

72. Devastating Weapon

73. Horror Hospital

74. A Treasure of the Pharaohs

75. Bird Death

76. The Armed Robbery

77. Secret Mission

78. Hackers Nile

79. Invisible Man

80. Devastating Automated

81. Golden Statue

82. Flower Devil

83. Bodyguard
