= List of titles of Ma Waraa Al Tabiaa series =

This is a list of titles of Ma Waraa Al Tabiaa series by Ahmed Khaled Tawfik. As of February 2014, 81 titles were published. Additionally, 7 special issues have been published under the series.

1. Massas Al Demaa Wa Ostorat Al Ragol Al Zeab (Arabic: مصاص الدماء و أسطورة الرجل الذثب) (The Vampire and the Legend of the Werewolf).
2. Ostorat Al Naddaha (أسطورة النداهة) (The Legend of Al Naddaha)
3. Ostorat Wahsh Al Boheera (أسطورة وحش البحيرة) (The Legend of the Loch Ness monster).
4. Ostorat Aakel Al Bashar (أسطورة آكل البشر) (The Legend of the Cannibal).
5. Ostorat Al Mouta Al Ahyaa (أسطورة الموتى الأحياء) (The Legend of the Living Dead).
6. Ostorat Raas Medossa (أسطورة رأس ميدوسا) (The Legend of the Head of Gorgon Medusa).
7. Ostorat Hares Al Kahf (أسطورة حارس الكهف) (The Legend of the Guardian of the Cave).
8. Ostorat Ard Okhra (أسطورة أرض أخرى) (The Legend of Another Earth).
9. Ostorat Lanet Al Feroon (أسطورة لعنة الفرعون) (The Legend of the Curse of the Pharaoh).
10. Halqat Al Roeb (حلقة الرعب) (The Circle of Terror).
11. Ostorat Al Kahen Al Akheer (أسطورة الكاهن الأخير) (The Legend of the Last Monk ).
12. Ostorat Al Bayt (أسطورة البيت) (The Legend of the House).
13. Ostorat Al Lahab Al Azraq (أسطورة اللهب الأزرق) (The Legend of the Blue Flame).
14. Ostorat Ragol Al Tholog (أسطورة رجل الثلوج) (The Legend of the ice monster (Big Foot)).
15. Ostorat Al Nabat (أسطورة النبات) (The Legend of the Plant).
16. Ostorat Al Nafari (أسطورة النافارى) (The Legend of the Navarai).
17. Ostorat Hassna Al Maqbara (أسطورة حسناء المقبرة) (The Legend of the cemetery beauty).
18. Ostorat Al Ghoraba (أسطورة الغرباء) (The Legend of the strangers).
19. Ostorat Boo (أسطورة بو) (The Legend of Poe).
20. Hekayat Al Taroot (حكايات التاروت) (Tales of the Tarot).
21. Ostorat Addew Al Shams (أسطورة عدو الشمس) (The Legend of the sun's enemy (Albino)).
22. Ostorat Al Menotor (أسطورة المينوتور) (The Legend of the Minotaur).
23. Ostorat Roeb Al Mostanqaat (أسطورة رعب المستنقعات) (The Legend of the swamp horror).
24. Ostorat Igor (أسطورة إيجور) (The Legend of Igor).
25. Ostorat Al General Al Aaed (أسطورة الجنرال العائد) (The Legend of the Returning General).
26. Ostorat Al Mowagaha (أسطورة المواجهة) (The Legend of the confrontation).
27. Ostoratona (أسطورتنا) (Our Legend).
28. Ostorat Akher Al Layl (أسطورة آخر الليل) (The Legend of the End of the Night).
29. Ostorat Al Gassom (أسطورة الجاثوم) (The Legend of Incubus).
30. Ostorat Baed Montassaf Al Layl (أسطورة بعد منتصف اليل) (The Legend of After Midnight).
31. Ostoratha (أسطورتها) (Her Legend).
32. Ostorat Rifaat (أسطورة رفعت) (The Legend of Refaat).
33. Ostorat Ard Al Maghool (أسطورة أرض المغول) (The Legend of the Land of Mongols).
34. Ostorat Al Shahibeen (أسطورة الشاحبين) (The Legend of the Pales).
35. Ostorat Demaa Dracula (أسطورة دماء دراكيولا) (The Legend of Dracula's Blood).
36. Ostorat Al Fassela Al Sadessa (أسطورة الفصيلة السادسة) (The Legend of the Sixth Platoon).
37. Ostorat Al Domia (أسطورة الدمية) (The Legend of the voodoo Doll).
38. Ostorat Al Nesf Al Akhar (أسطورة النصف الآخر) (The Legend of the Other Half).
39. Ostorat Al Tawamyn (أسطورة التوءمين) (The Legend of the Twins).
40. Waraa Al Bab Al Moghlak (وراء الباب المغلق) (Behind the Closed Door).
41. Ostorat Frankeshtine (أسطورة فرانكشتاين) (The Legend of Frankenstein).
42. Ostorat Al Kalimat Al Saba (أسطورة الكلمات السبع) (The Legend of the Seven Words).
43. Ostoraton Takhtalef (أسطورة تختلف) (A Legend that Differs).
44. Ostorat Ragol Bekeen (أسطورة رجل بكين) (The Legend of the Beijing man).
45. Ostorat Bayt Al Afaee (أسطورة بيت الأفاعي) (The Legend of the House of the Reptiles).
46. Ostorat Teflen Aakhr (أسطورة طفل آخر) (The Legend of Another Child).
47. Ostorat Al Manzel Raqam (5) ((أسطورة المنزل رقم (5) (The Legend of House Number (5)).
48. Ostorat Al Momyaa (أسطورة المومياء) (The Legend of the Mummy).
49. Ostorat Al Asheera (أسطورة العشيرة) (The Legend of the Tribe).
50. Fe Ganeb Al Nogoom (فى جانب النجوم) (At the Side of the Stars).
51. Ostorat Al Raqam Al Mashnoom (أسطورة الرقم المشئوم) (The Legend of the Cursed Number).
52. Ostora Momella (أسطورة مملة) (A Boring legend).
53. Ostorat Al Noboaa (أسطورة النبوءة) (The Legend of the Prophecy).
54. Ostorat Al Arraf (أسطورة العراف) (The legend of the fortuneteller).
55. Ostorat (099###) ((أسطورة (###099) (The Legend of (099###)).
56. Ostorat Malek Al Zobab (أسطورة ملك الذباب) (The Legend of the King of Flies).
57. Ostorat Al Makbara (أسطورة المقبرة) (The Legend of the cemetery).
58. Ostorat Ard Al Azaya (أسطورة أرض العظايا) (The Legend of the Land of Lizards).
59. Ostorat Roneal Al Sowdaa (أسطورة رونيل السوداء) (The Legend of Black Ronealle).
60. Al Mathaf Al Asswad (المتحف الأسود) (The Black Museum).
61. Ostorat Al Sheea (أسطورة الشىء) (The Legend of the Thing).
62. Ostorat Sondoq Bandora (أسطورة صندوق بندورا) (The Legend of Pandora's box).
63. Ostorat Al Moharrekeen (أسطورة المحركين) (The Legend of the psycho-kinetics).
64. Ostorathom (أسطورتهم) (Their Legend).
65. Ostorat Al Alamaat Al Dameya (أسطورة العلامات الدامية) (The Legend of the Bloody Marks).
66. Ostorat Al Regal Allazeen Lam Yaoodo Kazalk (أسطورة الرجال الذين لم يعودوا كذلك) (The Legend of the Men Who are No Longer So).
67. Ostorat Bayt Al Ashbah (أسطورة بيت الأشباح) (The Legend of the House of the Ghosts).
68. Ostorat Ard Al Zalam (أسطورة أرض الظلام) (The Legend of the Land of Darkness).
69. Ostorat Nady Al Gelaan (أسطورة نادي الغيلان) (The Legend of the Ghoul club).
70. Al Halakaat Al Manseyya (الحلقات المنسية) (The Forgotten Episodes).
71. Ostorat Al Zelal (أسطورة الظلال) (The Legend of the Shadows).
72. Ostorat Al Taotam (أسطورة الطوطم) (The Legend of the Totem).
73. Ostorat Shebh Mokhefa (أسطورة شبه مخيفة) (A Somewhat Scary Legend).
74. Ostorat Oghniat Al Mawot (أسطورة أغنية الموت) (The Legend of the Death Song).
75. Ostorat Al Tofayel (أسطورة الطفيل) (The Legend of the Parasite).
76. Ostorat Ma'rad Al Ro'ob (أسطورة معرض الرعب) (The Legend of Horror Fair).
77. Ostorat Alfata Al Zarqaa (أسطورة الفتاة الزرقاء) (The Legend of the Blue Girl).
78. Ostorat Hamel Al Diaa Geem 1 (أسطورة حامل الضياء ج1) (The Legend of the Light-bringer part 1).
79. Ostorat Hamel Al Diaa Geem 2 (أسطورة حامل الضياء ج2) (The Legend of the Light-bringer part 2).
80. Ostorat Al Asateer 1 (1أسطورة الأساطيرج) (The Legend of Legends part 1).
81. Ostorat Al Asateer 2 (2أسطورة الأساطيرج) (The Legend of Legends part 2).

Special issues:

1. Fee Koohhoof Dragosan (فى كهوف دراجوسلان) (In Dragosan's Caves).
2. 36.
3. Al Abjadiyah (الأبجدية) (The Alphabet).
4. Qissattan (قصتان) (Two Stories).
5. Ostorat Messia (اسطورة ميسيا) (The Legend of Messia).
6. Ostorat Al Mar'ah Al Af-a (أسطورة المرأة الأفعى) (The Legend of the Snake Woman).
7. Aghani Al Mahd (أغانى المهد) (Cradle Songs).
