= List of titles of Malaf Al Mostakbal series =

This is a list of titles of Malaf Al Mostakbal, an Egyptian science fiction series of novels by Nabil Farouk. 160 titles were published from 1984 to 2009.

1. Ashaet Al Mout (Arabic: أشعة الموت) (The Death Rays).
2. Ekhtfa Sarokh (اختفاء صاروخ) (Disappearance of a Rocket).
3. Madinat Al Amaq (مدينة الأعماق) (The City of the Depths).
4. Ghosat Al Fadaa (غزاة الفضاء) (The Aliens).
5. Al Qonbola Al Ghameda (القنبلة الغامضة) (The Mysterious Bomb).
6. Zaer Men Al Mostakbal (زائر من المستقبل) (A Visitor from the Future).
7. Gonoon Taera (جنون طائرة) (A Plane's Madness).
8. Al Ertgag Al Qatel (الارتجاج القاتل) (The Deadly Shaking).
9. Seraa Al Hawas (صراع الحواس) (Fight of the Senses).
10. Al Fares Al Maghool (الفارس المجهول) (The Mysterious Knight).
11. Mentaka Al Roeb (منطقة الرعب) (Zone of Horror).
12. Tareq Al Ashbah (طريق الأشباح) (Road of the Ghosts).
13. Al Zamzn Al Mafqood (الزمن المفقود) (The Lost Time).
14. Nedaa Al Nogoom (نداء النجوم) (Call of the Stars).
15. Mothallas Al Ghomood (مثلث الغموض) (Triangle of Mystery).
16. Al Wabaa Al Ghamed (الوباء الغامض) (The Mysterious Disease).
17. Nabd Al Kholood (نبض الخلود) (Pulse of Immortality).
18. Zlal Al Phazaa (ظلال الفزع) (Shadows of Terror).
19. Oyoon Al Halak (عيون الهلاك) (Eyes of Death).
20. Al Okool Al Maadanyya (العقول المعدنية) (The Metallic Minds).
21. Atyaf Al Mady (أطياف الماضى) (Ghosts of the Past).
22. Laylat Al Roeb (ليلة الرعب) (Night of Horror).
23. Bassamat Al Sahara (بصمات السحرة) (The Finger Prints of Wizards).
24. Al Doua Al Aswad (الضوء الأسود) (The Black Light).
25. Sahwet Al Sharr (صحوة الشر) (Rise of Evil).
26. Laanet Al Fadaa (لعنة الفضاء) (The Curse of Space).
27. Al Fakh Al Zogagy (الفخ الزجاجى) (The Glass Trap).
28. Al Nahr Al Mokaddas (النهر المقدس) (The Sacred River).
29. Al Eeqaa Al Moftares (الإيقاع المفترس) (The Predatory Rhythm).
30. Al Nar Al Bareda (النار الباردة) (The Cold Fire).
31. Raneen Al Samt (رنين الصمت) (Echo of Silence).
32. AL Ofq Al Akhdar (الأفق الأخضر) (The Green Horizon).
33. Hares Al Arwah (حارس الأرواح) (Guard of the Souls).
34. Wahsh Al Moheet (وحش المحيط) (The Ocean Monster).
35. Meraat Al Ghad (مرآة الغد) (Mirror of Tomorrow).
36. Al Mout Al Azraq (الموت الأزرق) (The Blue Death).
37. Al Samaa Al Mozlemah (السماء المظلمة) (The Dark Sky).
38. Men Waraa Al Nogoom (من وراء النجوم) (From Beyond the Stars).
39. Al Tholog Al Sakhena (الثلوج الساخنة) (The Hot Snow).
40. Alamat Al Khawf (علامات الخوف) (Signs of Fear).
41. Mamlakt Al Nar (مملكة النار) (Kingdom of Fire).
42. Al Ard Al Thania (الأرض الثانية) (The Second Earth).
43. Thokb Fe El Tarekh (ثقب فى التاريخ) (A Hole in History).
44. Al Khareqoon (الخارقون) (The Superhumans).
45. Al Sahab Al Ahmar (السحاب الأحمر) (The Red Clouds).
46. Al Kawkab Al Maloon (الكوكب الملعون) (The Cursed Planet).
47. Al Mokatel Al Akheer (المقاتل الأخير) (The Last Fighter).
48. Segn Al Qamqr (سجن القمر) (Prison of the Moon).
49. Ghazw Al Ard (غزو الأرض) (Invasion of Earth).
50. Al Ostorah (الأسطورة) (The Legend).
51. Al Khaleyya Al Qatela (الخلية القاتلة) (The Deadly Cell).
52. Al Adeww Al Khaphy (العدو الخفى) (The Invisible Enemy).
53. Amtar Al Mout (أمطار الموت) (Rains of Death).
54. Abr Al Ossoor (عبر العصور) (Through the Ages).
55. Asra Al Zaman (أسرى الزمن) (Prisoners of Time).
56. Shaytan Al Agyal (شيطان الأجيال) (The Devil of Generations).
57. Mentaka Al Dyaa (منطقة الضياع) (The Area of Loss).
58. Maaraket Al Kwakeb (معركة الكواكب) (Battle of the Planets).
59. Gaheem Arghoran (جحيم أرغوران) (Arghoran's Hell).
60. Ard Al Amaleqa (أرض العمالقة) (Land of the Giants).
61. Al Kabos (الكابوس) (The Nightmare).
62. Sadet Al Amaaq (سادة الأعماق) (Masters of the Depths).
63. Al Moheet Al Moltaheb (المحيط الملتهب) (The Boiling Ocean).
64. Al Sayf Al Bellory (السيف البللورى) (The Crystal Sword).
65. Abwab Al Mawt (أبواب الموت) (Doors of Death).
66. Al Shams Al Zarqaa (الشمس الزرقاء) (The Blue Sun).
67. Shaytan Al Fadaa (شيطان الفضاء) (The Space Devil).
68. Oqool Al Sharr (عقول الشر) (Minds of Evil).
69. Al Alam Al Akhar (العالم الآخر) (The Other World).
70. Al Star Al Aswad (الستار الأسود). (The Black Curtain)
71. Amir Al Zalam (أمير الظلام) (The Prince of Darkness).
72. Ibn Al Shaytan (ابن الشيطان) (Son of the Devil).
73. Mabooth Al Gaheem (مبعوث الجحيم) (Hell's Messenger).
74. Al Seraa Al Gohannami (الصراع الجهنمى) (The Infernal Struggle).
75. Al Gawla Al Akhera (الجولة الأخيرة) (The Last Round).
76. Al Ehtlal (الاحتلال) (The Occupation).
77. Al Moqawma (المقاومة) (The Resistance).
78. Al Seraa (الصراع) (The Struggle).
79. Al Tahaddy (التحدى) (The Challenge).
80. Al Nasr (النصر) (The Victory).
81. Ramz Al Qowwah (رمز القوة) (Sign of Power).
82. Hessn Al Ashrar (حصن الأشرار) (Fortress of the Evil Men).
83. Ard Al Adam (أرض العدم) (Land of Nothingness).
84. Kanz Al Fadaa (كنز الفضاء) (The Treasure of Space).
85. Al Aml Al Fayroozi (الأمل الفيروزى) (The Turquoise Hope).
86. Al Emprator (الإمبراطور) (The Emperor).
87. Nesf Aly (نصف آلى) (Half-Machine).
88. Al Enfgar Al Hayy (الانفجار الحى) (The Living Explosion).
89. Al Borkan (البركان) (The Volcano).
90. Roeb Fel Aamaq (رعب فى الأعماق) (Horror in the Depths).
91. Ded Al Zaman (ضد الزمن) (Against Time).
92. Al Rehla Al Raheeba (الرحلة الرهيبة) (The Horrible Journey).
93. Noqdet Al Sefr (نقطة الصفر) (The Zero Point).
94. Al Saher (الساحر) (The Magician).
95. Al Qowwa Al Sawdaa (القوة السوداء) (The Black Force).
96. Bozoor Al sharr (بذور الشر) (Seeds of Evil).
97. Laheeb al Kawakeb (لهيب الكواكب) (Flame of the Planets).
98. Neran Al Koon (نيران الكون) (Fires of the Universe).
99. Al Enfgar (الانفجار) (The Explosion).
100. Al Zaman = Sefr (الزمن = صفر) (Time = Zero).
101. Al Herbaa (الحرباء) (The Chameleon).
102. Al Tawaam Al Raheeb (التوءم الرهيب) (The Horrible Twin).
103. Al Ard Al Mafqooda (الأرض المفقودة) (The Lost Land).
104. Anyab W Makhaleb (أنياب و مخالب) (Fangs and Claws).
105. Wogooh Men Thalg (وجوه من ثلج) (Faces From Ice).
106. Bela Athar (بلا أثر) (Without a Trace).
107. Lanet Al Damm (لعنة الدم) (The Curse of Blood).
108. Masydet Al Fadaa (مصيدة الفضاء) (The Space Trap).
109. Al Dawwama (الدوامة) (The Vortex).
110. Al Fagwa Al Sawdaa (الفجوة السوداء) (The Black Hole).
111. Kawkab Al Toghah (كوكب الطغاة) (Planet of the Tyrants).
112. Basmet Al Moot (بصمة الموت) (The Finger Print of Death).
113. Harb Al Vayrossat (حرب الفيروسات) (War of the Viruses).
114. Al Roaeb (الرعب) (The Horror).
115. Al Adeww Al Khareq (العدو الخارق) (The Superhuman Enemy).
116. Al Assefah Al Nawaweyya (العاصفة النووية) (The Nuclear Storm).
117. Fares Al Zaman (فارس الزمن) (The Time Knight).
118. Alf Asr (ألف عصر) (A Thousand Ages).
119. Zaman Al Damm (زمن الدم) (The Period of Blood).
120. Al Fares Al Thani (الفارس الثانى) (The Second Knight).
121. Al Maghool (المجهول) (The Unknown).
122. Al Zelaal al Raheeba (الظلال الرهيبة) (The Horrible Shadows).
123. Daerat Al Zel (دائرة الظل) (The Circle of Shadow).
124. Al Ghozah (الغزاة) (The Invaders).
125. Korat Al Nar (كرة النار) (The Fireball).
126. Laheeb Al Roeb (لهيب الرعب) (The Flames of Horror).
127. Tareq Al Nogoom (طريق النجوم) (Road of the Stars).
128. Al Zaman Al Akhar (الزمن الآخر) (The Other Period).
129. Waraa Al Aakl (وراء العقل) (Beyond the Mind).
130. Al Kowwa (القوة) (The Power).
131. Al Assefah (العاصفة) (The Storm).
132. Al Remal Al Hayya (الرمال الحية) (The Living Sand).
133. Noqdet Al Tamas (نقطة التماس) (The Point of Contact).
134. Sadet Al Kawn (سادة الكون) (Masters of the Universe).
135. Voodoo (فودو) (Voodoo).
136. Al Ahrash Al Phosphoriia (الأحراش الفسفورية) (The Phosphoric Forests).
137. Al Sharr (الشر) (The Evil).
138. Al Aamaq (الأعماق) (The Depths).
139. Harb Al Ashbah (حرب الأشباح) (The War of Ghosts).
140. Krasenat Al Zaman (قراصنة الزمن) (The Time Pirates).
141. Al Thaabeen (الثعابين) (The Snakes).
142. Anyaab (أنياب) (Fangs).
143. Bela Gassad (بلا جسد) (Without a Body).
144. Al Aaql (العقل) (The Mind).
145. Al Khasm Al Raheeb (الخصم الرهيب) (The Horrible Opponent).
146. Al Boqaa Al Mozlemah (البقعة المظلمة) (The Dark Spot).
147. Al Sahwa Al Kobra (الصحوة الكبرى) (The Great Awakening).
148. Awdet Al Sharr (عودة الشر) (Return of Evil).
149. Al Mokhkh (المخ) (The Brain).
150. Akher Al Amaleqa (آخر العمالقة) (The Last of the Giants).
151. Bela Waey (بلا وعى) (Unconscious).
152. Al Vairoos (الفيروس) (The Virus).
153. Al Mafkodoon (المفقودون) (The Lost Ones).
154. Al Zeabaq Al Gaf (الزئبق الجاف) (The Dry Mercury).
155. Al Kahf (الكهف) (The Cave).
156. Aalam Gadeed (عالم جديد) (A New World).
157. Atlal Al Mady (أطلال الماضى) (The Ruins of the Past).
158. Harb El Ghad (حرب الغد) (The War of Tomorrow).
159. Neraan Al Mostaqbal (نيران المستقبل) (Fire of the Future).
160. Nehayaet Al Aalam (نهاية العالم) (End of the World).
