= Fatima Al-Banawi =

Saudi filmmaker and actress

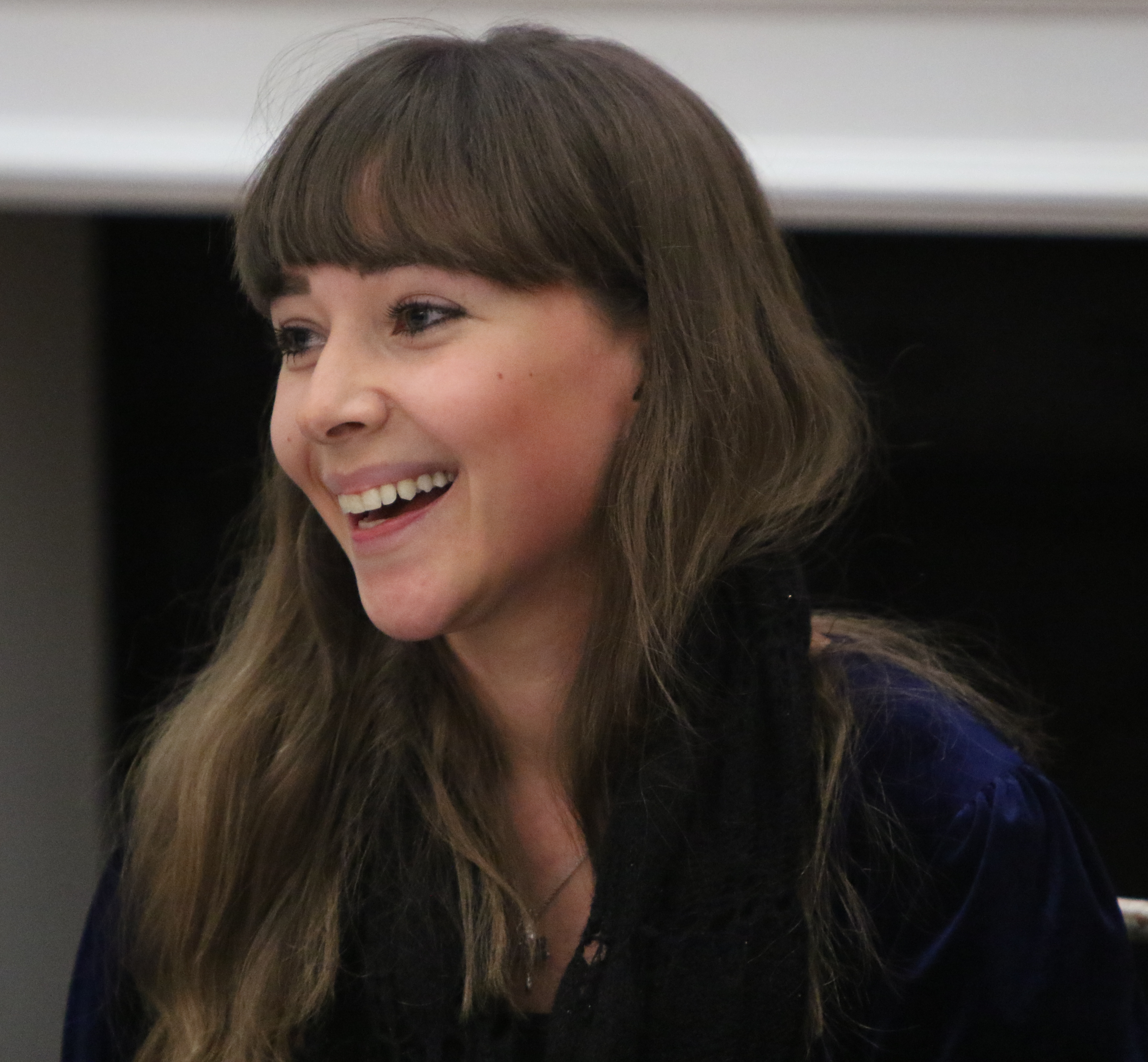
- Born: Fatima Al-Banawi; Jeddah, Saudi Arabia
- Education: Effat University; Harvard University
- Occupations: Director, producer, screenwriter, social activist, actress
- Years active: 2015–present
- Website: www.fatimaalbanawi.com

Fatima Al-Banawi (Arabic: فاطمة البنوي, Hejazi Arabic pronunciation: [ˈfaːtˤma alˈbanawi]) is a Saudi Arabian filmmaker and actress. She is best known as the director and actress of popular television serials and films Barakah Meets Barakah, A Blink of an Eye and Paranormal. She is also a renowned storyteller in Saudi Arabia.

== Personal life ==
Al-Banawi was born in Jeddah, Saudi Arabian actress . She graduated with a degree in counseling psychology from Effat University in Jeddah. She then started to work against violence at the Family Protection Society in Jeddah. In the meantime, she completed her master's degree in theological studies from Harvard University specializing in women, gender, and Islamic studies.

During her undergraduate period, she attended an advanced oil painting course at the School of the Museum of Fine Arts in Boston, Massachusetts. She worked as a social development and women's empowerment consultant at the Islamic Development Bank (IDB) for few months before entering the performing arts.

== Career ==
She founded the story telling project called the Other Story Project in 2015. Through the project, she has collected almost 5000 real-life stories from strangers. By using these lives, Al-Banawi later directed the short film A Blink of an Eye. Meanwhile, she has traveled locally and internationally to perform human stories. Later in 2018 the Ministry of Foreign Affairs in Paris call her the "Sophie Calle of Saudi Arabia" upon the warm reception of her performance "Amours Saoudiennes". In the same year, she was selected as a Next Generation Leader by Time magazine.

Using her own experiences, along with stories gathered from strangers in her hometown of Jeddah between 2015 and 2018, she wrote her first book, The Other Story. In 2010, she co-founded the Theatre of the Oppressed chapter located in Jeddah. Then she started to perform many stage plays at the theater. Later some of its plays were performed at Harvard.

In 2016, she made her film debut in the award-winning Saudi feature film, Barakah Meets Barakah. She was internationally recognized with the role and made the way for Saudi Arabian cinema. The film was selected as the Saudi Arabian entry for the Best Foreign Language Film at the 89th Academy Awards (the second time the country made a submission for the Oscars). The film premiered at the Forum section of the 66th Berlin International Film Festival making it the first Saudi feature film to premiere at the festival.

Then she appeared in the television serial Bashar and the short Going South. The latter was represented at the Clermont-Ferrand International Short Film Festival. In 2019, she made a special appearance in the feature film Roll'em and television serial Om AlQalayed. In 2019, she directed the stage play The Straight Circle Play in which she also played the lead role.

In 2020, Al-Banawi appeared in the Egyptian web series Paranormal which was based on the supernatural book series Ma Waraa Al Tabiaa written by Ahmed Khaled Tawfik. In the series, she played a supportive role of Nargis. The series was released on 5 November 2020 on Netflix, becoming Netflix's first Egyptian original.

In 2020, she wrote and directed her first short film Until We See Light. Then during the global COVID-19 pandemic, she co-wrote, co-directed and starred in television serial Al-Shak Series, which she shot fully from home during the lockdown. He latest feature films as an actress include Route 10, directed by Omar Naim; and Champions, an adaptation of a Spanish film about a soccer team with special needs members, both films were produced by MBC Group and Image Nation. In 2023, Al-Banawi appeared for the first time of her career in the Egyptian cinema, in the comedy film El Ameel Sefr directed by Karim El-Adl and starring Akram Hosny. The film was produced by Oscar for Distribution and Theaters. In 2024, she directed her feature film Basma, after winning a fund from the Red Sea International Film Festival.

== Filmography ==
Year	Film	Role	Genre	Ref.
2016	Barakah Meets Barakah	Actress: Barakah / Bibi	Film	
2018	A Blink of an Eye	Director, writer, actress: Narrator	Film	
2019	Roll'em	Script supervisor, Actress: Sophie	Film	
2019	Goin South	Actress: Aya	Short film	
2020	Doubt	Director, writer, actress: Samar	TV series short	
2020	Paranormal	Actress: Nargis	TV series	
2021	Champions	Actress: Nada	Film	
2022	Route 10	Actress	Film	
2023	Alhamour	Actress	Film	
2023	El Ameel Sefr	Actress	Film	
2024	Basma	Director, actress: Basma	Film	
