= Rewayat =

Egyptian fiction novels

Rewayāt Masreyya Lel Gēb (Egyptian Pocket Novels) (روايات مصرية للجيب), aka Rewayat is an Arabic series of stories and books published in Egypt by the Modern Arab Association and distributed worldwide by the same publishing house.

== Authors ==
- Ahmed Khaled Tawfik: Ma Waraa Al Tabiaa, Safari and Fantasia.
- Nabil Farouk: Ragol Al Mostaheel, Malaf Al Mostakbal, Cocktail 2000 and others.
- Khaled Al Safti: Flash, Smash and others.
- Mohamed Sulaiman Abdul-Malek: Mogamraat 'Seen', Lotus, Maktab 17.
- Tamir Ibrahim: Awraak Maghool, Aalam Ahkar.
