= Utopia (Tawfik novel) =

2008 book by Ahmed Khaled Tawfik

- Author: Ahmed Khaled Tawfik
- Translator: Bloomsbury Publishing
- Language: Arabic; English
- Publication date: 2008
- Publication place: Egypt
- Pages: 192
- ISBN: 978 9 9921 9430 0 Translated

Utopia is a social novel by Egyptian author Ahmed Khaled Tawfik, published in 2008. It is his first novel released outside the Modern Arab Association, and it ranked second on the best-selling books list at Merit Publishing.

The novel was serialized in six parts in the Egyptian newspaper Al-Dustour in 2006, but additional events were included in the book. It was published by Merit Publishing in 2008, and an English translation was released by Bloomsbury Publishing.

== Synopsis ==
The novel is set in the year 2023, where Egypt is divided into two classes. The first is extremely wealthy and lives in luxury in Utopia, a city surrounded by walls and guarded by Marines, located on the North Coast. The second class lives in abject poverty, residing in slums and fighting for food. The story follows a wealthy young man from Utopia who seeks adventure to break the monotony and boredom of life by hunting a poor human from the Shubra area. He plans to toy with him alongside his friends for enjoyment before killing him and keeping a part of his body as a trophy, which is a new hobby among the rich living in Utopia, representing the world of the affluent.

Ahmed Khaled Tawfik explicitly relies on scientific statistics and reports in certain parts, such as a report by Dr. Ahmed Okasha on addiction in Egypt and a journalistic report from the Forum for Development and Human Rights Dialogue on violence against women. He also references the website Masrawy as one of the online sources.

The poet Abdel Rahman el-Abnudi appears with his political and national poems on the pages of the novel.

== Main characters ==
- Utopian young man: He introduced himself as Alaa, the son of (Murad Pasha), a wealthy young man living in Utopia who has grown tired of his affluent life.
- Germinal: Alaa's friend who leaves Utopia with him.
- Jaber: The poor, educated young man who shelters Alaa and Germinal in his home.
- Safiya: Jaber's sister.

== Reception ==
The English translation has been reviewed in several journals and books.

In 2015, it was announced that Utopia was going to be adapted into a movie.
