= Samaha =

Samaha is an Arabic origin surname. Notable people with the surname include:

- Aya Samaha (born 1992), Egyptian actress
- Carole Samaha (born 1972), Lebanese singer and actress
- Elie Samaha, Lebanese American film producer
- Giovani Samaha (born 1994), Lebanese tennis player
- Joseph Samaha (1949–2007), Lebanese journalist
- Joumana Samaha, birth name of Joumana Kidd, American journalist
- Lucien Samaha (born 1958), Lebanese American photographer
- Michel Samaha (born 1948), Lebanese politician
- Roy Samaha (born 1984), Lebanese basketball player
