= Razane Jammal =

British-Lebanese actress (born 1987)

- رزان جمال
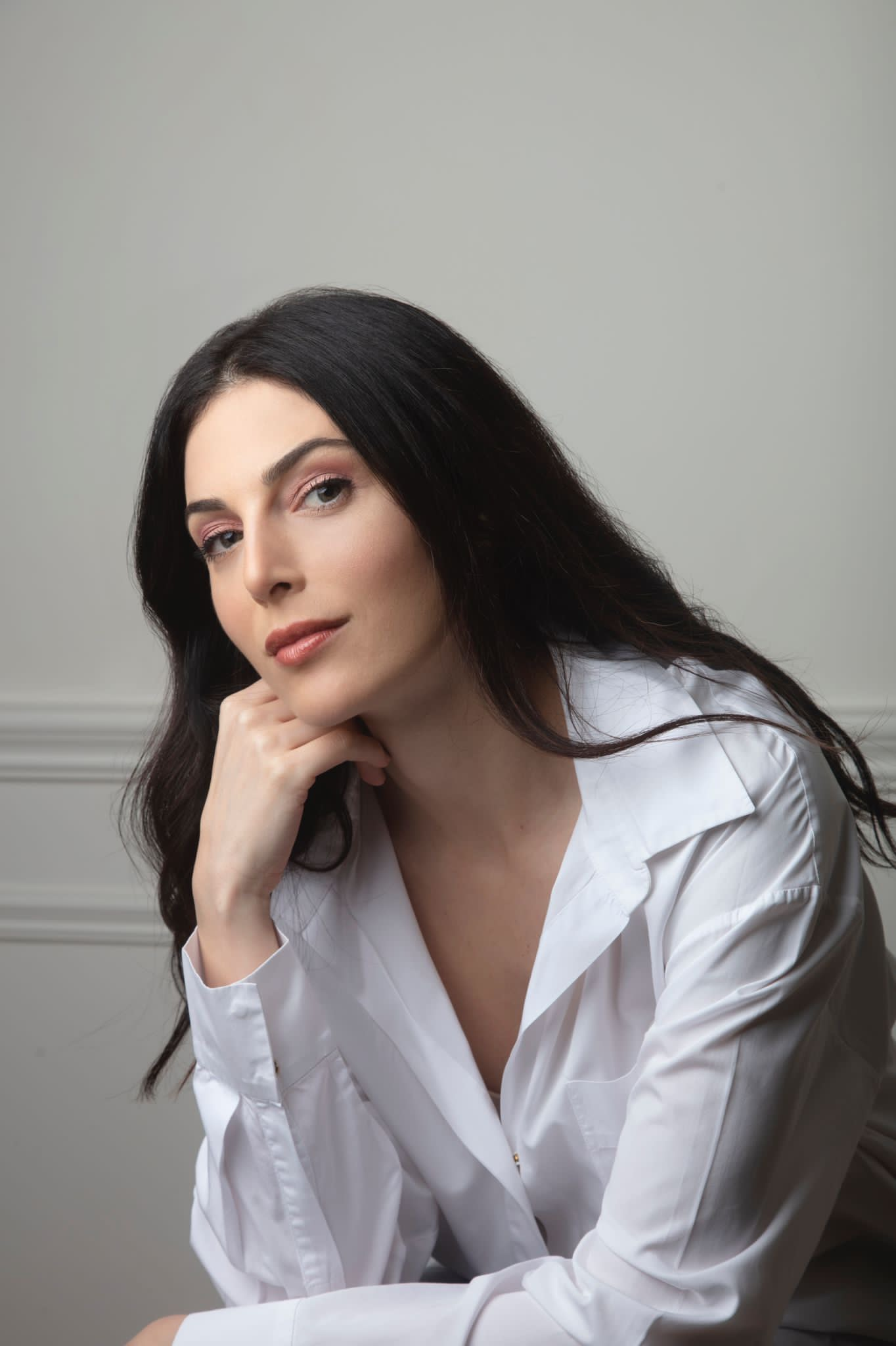
- Razane Jammal in 2022
- Born: 7 August 1987 (age 38); Beirut, Lebanon
- Occupation: Actress
- Years active: 2010–present
- Website: www.razanejammal.com

Razane Jammal (Arabic: رزان جمّال; born 7 August 1987) is a Lebanese-British actress and author. She is best known for her roles in the Arabic series ''Al Thaman'', Netflix Original series Paranormal, and the historical film ''Kira & El Gin'', and her work in films by Kanye West, Robert Guédiguian, Marwan Hamed and Olivier Assayas. She plays Lyta Hall in the 2022 Netflix adaptation of Neil Gaiman's The Sandman. In 2025, she made her literary debut with the children's book ''Lulu and Blu''.

== Biography ==
=== Early life ===
Razane Jammal was born and raised in Beirut, Lebanon. She started acting in television commercials at age 15, taking part in regional campaigns in the Middle East. At age 18 she moved to London where she studied business at King's College, and was eventually cast in her first film role in 2009 in Carlos by Olivier Assayas.

=== Career ===
Her breakout role was in 2010's Carlos. In 2012, she was also part of the cast for Kanye West's debut short film screened at the Cannes Film Festival, Cruel Summer. In 2014 she starred with Liam Neeson in A Walk Among the Tombstones (2014). In 2015, she starred in Robert Guédiguian's Don't Tell Me The Boy Was Mad, which premiered at the 2015 Cannes Film Festival. She played the role of Maggie in the Netflix Original series Paranormal, based on the books by Ahmed Khaled Tawfik. The series is directed by Amr Salama and Majid Al Ansari.

In May 2021, it was announced that Jammal had joined the cast of The Sandman for Netflix, based on Neil Gaiman's DC Comics graphic novel. In 2022, Jammal appeared in the Egyptian historical film Kira & El Gin, directed by Marwan Hamed. In 2023, she starred in the Arabic drama series Al Thaman (The Price), gaining wide popularity across the Middle East. In 2024, she appeared in the MBC drama series Al Qadar.

== Writing ==
In 2025, Jammal made her debut as a children's book author with Lulu and Blu: The Tale of a Vegetarian Lioness, a Friendly Fish and Their Most Unusual Friendship, illustrated by Sasha Haddad and published by Turning Point. The story follows a vegetarian lioness and a friendly fish who form an unlikely friendship.

== Filmography ==
Television and film roles
Year	Title	Role	Notes
2010	Carlos	Lana Jarrar	Miniseries
2012	Cruel Summer	Queen	Short film; directed by Kanye West
2012	Flying Blind	Dima	Film
2013	Djinn	Salama	Film
2014	Embratoriyet Meen	Karla	Main role
2014	A Walk Among The Tombstones	Carrie Kristo	Film
2015	Saraya Abdeen	Ujeni	Recurring role, 5 episodes
2015	Don't Tell Me the Boy Was Mad	Anahit	Film
2016	Berlin Station	Aalia Bidwee	Episodes: "Lights Don't Run on Loyalty", "Proof of Life"
2017	Bad Buzz	Salayadinya	Film
2020	Paranormal	Maggie	Main role
2020	Doubt	Iman	Main role
2022	Kira & El Gin	Emily	Main role
2022	The Sandman	Lyta Hall	Recurring role
2023	Al Thaman	Sarah	Main role
2023	Taghyeer Gaw	Gisele	
2024	Al Qadar	Nour	Main role
