= El Naddaha =

Female spirit in Egyptian legend

En-Naddāha
Creature information
- Grouping: Water spirit
- Folklore: Legend

Origin
- Country: Egypt
- Region: Rural Egypt

En-Naddāha (Egyptian Arabic: النداهة "the caller") is an Egyptian legend of a naiad-like female spirit who calls men to the Nile, leading to their death or disappearance. It is especially well known in the rural and agriculture-based areas of Egypt along the Nile and the Nile's water canals.

== History ==
The exact origin of this legend is unknown. The story was more popular during the 20th century when Egypt was less urban than it is now, and people would spend more time close to the Nile and the Nile's water canals. Children would play by its shores after school, and young men would chat there at night. The myth has become less popular in urban areas at present, though it is still familiar to the youth, and well known in rural Egypt.

== Description ==
En-Naddaha takes the form of stunningly beautiful woman who appears, as if by chance, to men walking by the Nile or the Nile's water canals at night. The men are usually a pair. The creature calls one by his first name, rendering him speechless, hypnotized, and obedient to her voice which he blindly follows, while the other man is unaffected, and attempts to pull the other back. The creature calls in a soft, sleepy, hypnotizing voice until the second unaffected man succeeds at last in reviving the called man from his trance. The two run away as fast as they can, hearing her voice still echoing as they run.

Usually the men do not get close enough to the Nile to get a glimpse of what the creature looks like before they run away. In rare instances, they get a glimpse of her. She is described as being a very beautiful young woman; tall, slender, with long flowing hair down her back. She stands steadily very near to the bank of the river, her hands placed at her sides, and wearing a loose, long semi-transparent dress. In many instances she is described as having a semi-transparent body. Her voice is calm and soft, yet loud.

In rural Egypt, where the legend is prominent, the creature may call for men in their homes by the shores of the Nile and the Nile's water canals, who then eagerly attempt to leave home for her. In other tales, the affected man will not immediately try to follow, but he will enter a state of disturbed distraction for a few nights before at last departing late at night. People in rural Egypt believe that a man who is called for by En-Naddaha is doomed, curing him is often impossible. Not a single instance has been recorded where a man is seen devoured by her. But many old local citizens believe she consumes or pulls her victims into the Nile and drowns them.

The Egyptian writer Ahmed Khaled Tawfik, in his The Legend of Al Naddaha, says that a man who prevents the called man from reaching the creature by any means would be the next to be called.

== In media ==
El Nadaha shows up in many Egyptian horror tv series and movies most notably in the Netflix series Paranormal , the El Kabeer Awy series subverts that trope as it portrays the Nadaha in a comedic setting in one of its episodes .

== See also ==
- Siren (mythology)
- La Llorona
