= Annals of Pediatric Surgery =

- Discipline: Pediatrics, surgery
- Language: English
- Edited by: Essam A. Elhalaby

Publication details
- History: 2005–present
- Publisher: Lippincott Williams & Wilkins
- Frequency: Quarterly

Standard abbreviations
- ISO 4: Ann. Pediatr. Surg.

Indexing
- ISSN: 1687-4137 (print); 2090-5394 (web)
- OCLC no.: 768170524

Links
- Journal homepage; Online access; Online archive

The Annals of Pediatric Surgery is a quarterly peer-reviewed medical journal covering research on pediatric surgery. It was established in October 2005 and is the official journal of the Egyptian Pediatric Surgical Association. The editor-in-chief is Essam A. Elhalaby Tanta University).

== Abstracting and indexing ==
The journal is abstracted and indexed in Scopus.
