= Fantazia (novel series) =

Book collection by Ahmed Khaled Tawfik

- Author: Ahmed Khaled Tawfik
- Country: Egypt
- Language: Arabic
- Publisher: Modern Arab Association
- No. of books: 64

Fantazia (Arabic: فانتازيا) is a virtual world novel series by Egyptian author Ahmed Khaled Tawfik. Its main character is Abeer Abdel Rahman, an antihero who can, with the help of a device invented by her husband, go through many fictional and historical adventures.

== Bibliography ==
1. Kessah La Tantahy (Arabic: قصة لا تنتهى) (Neverending Story).
2. Hekayat Men Wallachia (حكايات من والاشيا) (Stories from Wallachia).
3. Sefr..Sefr..Sabaa (صفر..صفر..سبعة) (Zero..Zero..Seven).
4. Embratoreyyet Al Nogoom (إمبراطورية النجوم) (Empire of the Stars).
5. Zat Marrah Fel Gharb (ذات مرة في الغرب) (Once upon a Time in the West).
6. Khoyool Wa Remah (خيول و رماح) (Horses and Spears).
7. Alaab Eghreqeyya (ألعاب إغريقية) (Greek Games).
8. Mamlaket Al Mowtah (مملكة الموتى) (Kingdom of The Dead).
9. Al Khannaqon (الخناقون) (The Stranglers).
10. Al Esm Shekspeer (الاسم شكسبير) (The Name's Shakespeare).
11. Nedaa Al Adghal (نداء الأدغال) (Jungle's Call).
12. Bayn Aalamayn (بين عالمين) (Between Two Worlds).
13. Ragol Men Krybton (رجل من كريبتون) (A Man From Krypton).
14. Men Baad Superman (من بعد سوبرمان) (After Superman).
15. Eadam Fel Borg (إعدام فى البرج) (Execution in the Tower).
16. Shabah Wa Shaytan (شبح و شيطان) (A Ghost and a Devil).
17. Ektolo Battoot (اقتلوا بطوط) (Kill Donald Duck).
18. Tom Wa Man Maah (توم و من معه) (Tom and His Fellows).
19. Khamsah Menhom (خمسة منهم) (A Five of them).
20. Man Faalaha (من فعلها؟) (Who Did it?).
21. La Tadkholo Sherwood (لا تدخلوا شيروود) (Don't Enter Sherwood).
22. Kalet Al Saffaheen (قلعة السفاحين) (The Castle of Assassins).
23. Ard..Qamar..Ard (أرض..قمر..أرض) (Earth..Moon..Earth).
24. Falyadkhol Al Tenneen (فليدخل التنين) (Let The Dragon In)
25. Men Aagl Torwadah (من أجل طروادة) (For Troy)
26. Aawdet Al Mohareb (عودة المحارب) (The Return of the Warrior)
27. Aakher Ayyam Al Rayekh (آخر أيام الرايخ) (Last Days of the Reich)
28. 1919
29. Al Wetwat (الوطواط) (The Bat).
30. Abqary (عبقرى) (Genius).
31. Esmoho Adham (اسمه أدهم) (His name is Adham).
32. Fe Mamlaket Al Akhawayn (فى مملكة الأخوين) (In the Kingdom of the Two Brothers)
33. Ayam Maa Hanibal (أيام مع هانيبال) (Days with Hannibal)
34. Aard La Tastatee Rafdoh (عرض لا تستطيع رفضه) (An Offer You Can't Refuse).
35. Ma Amam Al Tabiaa (ما أمام الطبيعة) (What's Sub-Natural).
36. Hob Fe Aghostos (حب فى أغسطس) (Love in August)
37. Falasefah Fe Hessaee (فلاسفة فى حسائى) (Philosophers in My Soup)
38. Aynan (عينان) (Two Eyes)
39. Sadeki Gilgamesh (صديقى جلجاميش) (My friend, Gilgamesh)
40. Archive Al Ghad (أرشيف الغد) (Tomorrow's Archive)
41. Alaab Faresyya (ألعاب فارسية) (Persian Games).
42. Al Malal Beayneh (الملل بعينه) (Boredom Itself)
43. Ostorat Nahr (أسطورة نهر) (Legend of a River)
44. Shaye Men Hatta (شىء من حتى) (Some of "Hatta")
45. Che (تشى) (Che "as in Che Guevara").
46. Al Halem Al Akheer (الحالم الأخير) (The Last Dreamer)
47. Al Saher W Ana (الساحر و أنا) (The Magician and Me)
48. Al Loghz (اللغز) (The Puzzle).
49. Youm Gharak Al Ostool (يوم غرق الأسطول) (The Day The Fleet Sunk).
50. Hya wl Ana (هى و الأنا) (She and Ego).
51. Falnonkiz Al Dotshy (فلننقذ الدوتشي) (Let's Save the Dotshy).
52. B 4 M (ب 4 م).
53. Bahharan (بحاران) (Two Sailors).
54. Abqari Aakhar (عبقري آخر) (Another Genius).
55. Al Sayyadon (الصيادون) (The Hunters).
56. Layal Arabiyya (ليال عربية) (Arabian Nights).
57. Kesset Kol Laila (قصة كل ليلة) (The Story of Every Night).
58. Al Batal Zo Al Alf Wagh (البطل ذو الألف وجه) (The Hero with a Thousand Faces).
59. Fy gaheem alalaab (فى جحيم الالعاب) (In the Hell of Games).
60. wahdy maa Lovecraft (وحدى مع لافكرافت) (Alone with Lovecraft)
61. mn catal alembratoor (من قتل الامبراطور) (Who Killed the Emperor)
62. ahlam (احلام) (dreams)
63. waad jonathan (وعد جوناثان) (Jonathan's Promise)
64. Kon-Tiki (كونتيكي) (Kon-Tiki)

== See also ==
- Ahmed Khaled Tawfik
- Ma Wara' al-Tabi'a
