= Last Floor Productions =

London media production company

- Industry: Film production Television production
- Founded: 2019
- Headquarters: London, England
- Key people: Nasri Atallah; Firas Abou Fakher; Daniel Habib
- Website: Official Website

Last Floor Productions is an independent film and television production company, headquartered in London. Last Floor Productions is specialized in the creation of projects that have an Arab focus. The company was founded by Nasri Atallah, Firas Abou Fakher and Daniel Habib in 2019.

== Company ==
Last Floor Productions was co-founded by screenwriter Daniel Habib, musician Firas Abou Fakher and writer Nasri Atallah.

The company's first project, Doubt (Al Shak) was created, commissioned, produced and released in a six-week period at the peak of the COVID-19 pandemic of 2020. Doubt was commissioned by MBC Group's Shahid streaming platform as a Shahid Original. The 10-part series was created, written and produced by Nasri Atallah, Firas Abou Fakher and Daniel Charbel Habib and co-directed by Mark Eid and Fatima Al-Banawi. It was shot remotely between Jeddah, Beirut, London and Abu Dhabi.

Last Floor's second collaboration with MBC Group's Shahid came later in 2020 in the form of action comedy Fixer, an 8-episode series about a celebrity fixer in the Arab world. The show was created by Firas Abou Fakher and Daniel Charbel Habib, and stars Badih Abou Chakra, Diamand Bou Abboud and Wissam Saliba were in the main roles. It was shot at a location in Lebanon.

In 2020, Last Floor Productions also created a series of six films for Apple featuring six Indian musicians, including AR Rahman, Divine, Raja Kumari, Aditi Ramesh, Prateek Kuhad and Lisa Mishra. In 2021, the company created the exhibition film accompanying the Jameel Prize at the Victoria & Albert Museum in London, profiling artists and designers inspired by Islamic tradition in London, New York, Lahore, Riyadh, Beirut, Kolkata & Dubai.

== Filmography ==
=== Television ===
Year	Series	Creator(s)	Co-productions	Network
2020	Doubt (Al Shak)	Firas Abou Fakher, Nasri Atallah, Daniel Habib	co-production with NBCUniversal Formats; Based on the Unfriended and Unfriended: Dark Web by Universal Pictures	MBC4 and Shahid VIP
2020	Fixer	Firas Abou Fakher, Daniel Habib		MBC4 and Shahid VIP

=== Commercials ===
Year	Title	Subject	Notes
2020	"Illuminating Creativity Series: India"	Apple	
2021	"Jameel Prize 6: Poetry to Politics"	Victoria and Albert Museum	
