= Aya Samaha =

Egyptian actress

Aya Samaha آية سماحة
- Born: Aya Samaha; 31 March 1992 (age 34); Cairo, Egypt
- Occupations: Director, producer, screenwriter
- Years active: 2016–present
- Spouse: Ibrahim Ramadan (m. 2020)

Aya Samaha (Arabic: آية سماحة; born 31 March 1992) is an Egyptian actress. She is best known for the roles in the Egyptian web series Paranormal, Grand Hotel and film Hepta: The Last Lecture.

== Personal life ==
She is married to film producer Ibrahim Ramadan in 2020.

== Career ==
In 2016, she started acting with the film Hepta: The Last Lecture directed by Hadi El Bagoury. She played a minor role as the 'Girl Speaking At The Lecture'. However, she then received a role in the Egyptian mystery drama serial Grand Hotel in 2016, where she features in all 30 episodes.

In 2020, she starred in the Egyptian web series Paranormal which was based on the supernatural book series Ma Waraa Al Tabiaa written by Ahmed Khaled Tawfik. In the series, she played a supportive role of 'Huwaida Abdel Moniem'. The series was released on 5 November 2020 on Netflix, becoming Netflix's first Egyptian Original.

== Filmography ==
Year	Film	Role	Genre	Ref.
2016	Hepta: The Last Lecture	Girl Speaking At The Lecture	Film	
2016	Grand Hotel	Duha	TV series	
2020	Paranormal	Huwaida Abdel Moniem	TV series	
