= El Sayed El Quseir =

Egyptian banker and politician

El Sayed El Quseir is an Egyptian banker and current minister of Agriculture and Land Reclamation. He previous served as the head of Industrial Development and Workers Bank of Egypt and president of the Development and Agricultural Credit Bank until his appointment as minister of Agriculture and Land Reclamation on 13 August 2022.

== Education and career ==
Quseir received a bachelor's degree in commerce from Tanta University in 1978 and a Diploma in Banking in 1985. Later he studied for another diploma at the Institute of Banking Studies of the Central Bank of Egypt. He worked as a lecturer at the Federation of Arab Banks, and the Arab Academy for Banking and Financial Sciences. He joined the National Bank of Egypt in 1980 and rose through the ranks in banking sector to executive positions. In 2011, he became the head of the Industrial Development and Workers Bank of Egypt and was appointed president of the Development and Agricultural Credit Bank in April 2016. He served in this position until 13 August 2022 when he was appointed minister of Agriculture and Land Reclamation.
