= Doubt (2020 TV series) =

2020 British-Lebanese television series

- Genre: Psychological Thriller
- Created by: Firas Abou Fakher; Daniel Habib; Nasri Atallah
- Based on: Unfriended by Universal Pictures
- Written by: Firas Abou Fakher; Daniel Habib; Nasri Atallah; Fatima Al-Banawi; Camille Cabbabe; Nelson Greaves; Stephen Susco
- Directed by: Mark Eid; Fatima Al-Banawi
- Starring: Fatima Al-Banawi; Kosai Khauli; Razane Jammal; Nadia Malaika; Baraa Alem
- Theme music composer: Firas Abou Fakher
- Countries of origin: United Kingdom, Lebanon, Saudi Arabia, United Arab Emirates
- Original languages: Arabic, English
- No. of series: 1
- No. of episodes: 10

Production
- Executive producers: Firas Abou Fakher; Daniel Habib; Nasri Atallah
- Production locations: Jeddah, Saudi Arabia; Beirut, Lebanon; London, United Kingdom
- Camera setup: Single-camera
- Running time: 10-12 minutes
- Production companies: Last Floor Productions, NBCUniversal Formats

Original release
- Network: Shahid, MBC Group, MBC4
- Release: 13 June 2020

Doubt (Original Arabic title الشك) is a British-Lebanese-Saudi psychological thriller television series created by Nasri Atallah, Firas Abou Fakher and Daniel Habib as a Shahid Original for MBC Group. It is based on the film of Unfriended and its Unfriended: Dark Web written by Nelson Greaves and Stephen Susco. It premiered on June 13, 2020.

The 10-episode series was conceived, produced and released within a two-month period at the during the first coronavirus lockdown, and relied heavily on remote filming techniques.

== Premise ==
Samar is isolated in her family's old house during lockdown. Mistakenly, she logs into the wrong video chat and witnesses a murder. The mysterious killer turns her life into a living hell, forcing her to fight for her life and face the demons of her past.

== Cast ==
- Fatima Al-Banawi as Samar
- Kosai Khauli as Malek, Samar's ex-husband
- Baraa Alem as Houssam, Samar's co-worker
- Razane Jammal as Iman, the therapist
- Nadia Malaika as Dima, Samar's sister

== Production ==
Doubt was commissioned from Last Floor Productions a Shahid Original for MBC Group’s Shahid streaming platform, the largest in the Middle East. Filming took place between Beirut, Jeddah and London. Due to it being conceived and shot at the peak of the first coronavirus lockdown, teams working remotely over video conference and many actors filming themselves with improvised set-ups in their own homes.

== Release date ==
Doubt was released on 13 June 2020 on Shahid.
