= Champions (2021 film) =

- Theatrical release poster
- Directed by: Manuel Calvo
- Written by: Manuel Calvo
- Produced by: Andrés Vicente Gómez; Marco Gómez; Stuart Sutherland
- Starring: Yassir Al Saggaf; Fatima Al Banawi
- Cinematography: Josep M. Civit
- Edited by: Pablo Blanco
- Music by: Amer Tashkandi
- Production companies: Al Maha Al Arabi; Al Maha Films; Arabian Horses; Creative Media Solutions
- Distributed by: Universal Pictures
- Release dates: December 10, 2021 (RSFF); March 10, 2022 (Saudi Arabia)
- Running time: 93 minutes
- Countries: Saudi Arabia; Spain
- Language: Arabic

Champions (Arabic: أبطال) is a 2021 Saudi Arabian-Spanish sports comedy film written and directed by Manuel Calvo. It is an Arabic-language remake of the 2018 Spanish film of the same name. Starring Yassir Al Saggaf and Fatima Al Banawi.

== Synopsis ==
After losing a match, Khaled is summoned to a disciplinary court. The sentence comes down and Khaled is forced into unexpected community service: banished from his prestigious job, he must now train a team of amateur players with disabilities. He despises this task, but it later opens his eyes to these players who are often discriminated against because of their disability.

== Cast ==
- Yassir Al Saggaf as Khaled
- Fatima Al-Banawi as Nada
- Khalid Alharbi as Nasser
- Walid Baeshin as The father
- Maya Bakhsh
- Khairia Nazmi

== Production ==
Principal photography started at the end of February 2020 in Jeddah, Saudi Arabia with plans to shoot for 7 weeks there and then in Dubai, but could not finish filming due to the COVID-19 pandemic. The last scenes had to be filmed a year later, at the expense of the lifting of restrictions in the country.

== Release ==
It had its world premiere on December 10, 2021, at the Red Sea International Film Festival. It was released commercially on March 10, 2022, in Saudi Arabian theaters.
