= Firas Abou Fakher =

Lebanese composer and musician

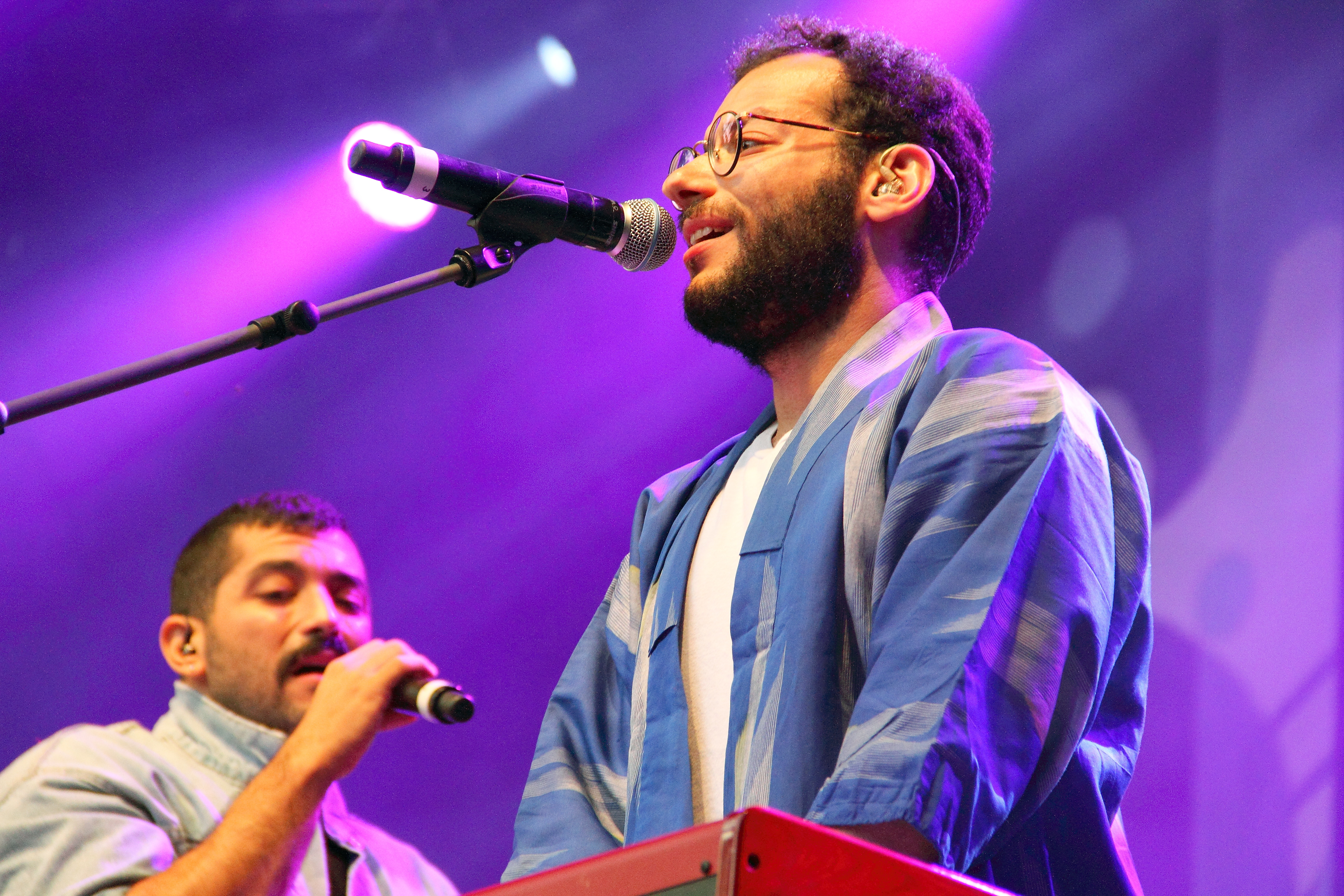
- Rudolstadt-Festival 2018

Background information
- Born: Lebanon
- Genres: Alternative rock, Indie
- Occupations: Composer; Multi-instrumentalist; Producer
- Member of: Mashrou' Leila

Firas Abou Fakher (Arabic: فراس أبو فخر) is a Lebanese BAFTA-winning composer, musician, producer and writer. He is best known as a composer, guitarist, and keyboardist with indie rock band Mashrou' Leila and the co-founder of Last Floor Productions.

== Biography ==
Firas Abou Fakher was born on 26 April 1988, in Beirut to Lebanese Venezuelan parents. His interest in music started at an early age and he taught himself to play guitar at the age of 13. While studying architecture at the American University of Beirut, Abou Fakher co-founded Mashrou' Leila as a reaction to the lack of quality Arabic Music. He started learning the piano at age 20. Abou Fakher is a multi-instrumentalist and currently plays guitar, keyboards, bass, and percussion.

During his architecture education, Abou Fakher received the Areen Projects Award for Excellence in Architecture and the Omrania CSBE award.

== Career ==
=== Mashrou' Leila ===
Abou Fakher is one of the founding members of Mashrou' Leila along with Hamed Sinno, Haig Papazian and Carl Gerges. He started playing guitar and composing songs with the band in 2008 and eventually started playing keyboard and bass after the departure of former members Omaya Malaeb and Ibrahim Badr.

In 2017 Abou Fakher taught a graduate workshop at the Hagop Kevorkian Institute for Near Eastern Studies at NYU as part of Mashrou' Leila.

In 2019 Abou Fakher performed with Mashrou' Leila at the Metropolitan Museum of Art as part of British artist Oliver Beer's Vessel Orchestra Exhibition alongside several notable artists including John Zorn, Nico Muhly and several others.

Abou Fakher has been featured on the cover of the Middle East editions of Rolling Stone and GQ Middle East as part of Mashrou' Leila.

=== Last Floor Productions ===
In late 2019, he co-founded Last Floor Productions with two longtime friends, writer and Lebanese Academy of Fine Arts screenwriting professor Daniel Habib and writer Nasri Atallah. Last Floor Productions is focused on the creation of genre film & television, centered on telling stories about Arabs around the world. The company's first production, Al Shak (Doubt), was written, shot and released entirely during the early phase of the coronavirus lockdown of 2020. It was produced as a Shahid Original for the leading streaming service launched by MBC Group. Last Floor Productions second series, Fixer, was released later the same year. Both series were co-created, co-executive produced and scored by Abou Fakher.

=== Independent work ===
Firas Abou Fakher has given talks and lectures as a composer and designer at ING Creatives.

He has scored several films, 'Kaleidoscope" by Lebanese director Dania Bdeir in 2014 which received numerous awards and most recently 'LOVE' by Lebanese Director Henri Bassil which won the 'Best Narrative Short Film' Award at the Moscow Short Film Festival in 2019.

Abou Fakher composed the music and sound design for the VR experience AVRA, an installation experimenting with sensory virtual reality.

In 2024, he won a BAFTA for his work as a composer on the BBC Two documentary The Shamima Begum Story.
