= Nour Hage =

Lebanese fashion designer (born 1988)

- Born: 20 June 1988 (age 37); Beirut, Lebanon
- Education: Parsons School of Design
- Label: Nour Hage
- Spouse: Nasri Atallah (m. 2015)
- Awards: Boghossian Foundation Prize

Nour Hage (born 20 June 1988) is a British-Lebanese fashion designer, textile artist and digital artist.

== Early life ==
Hage grew up between Beirut and Saudi Arabia, and moved to Paris aged 18 to study fashion design at Parsons School of Design (since renamed Paris College of Art), where she graduated in 2010. She has been based in London since 2016.

== Career ==
After graduating from Parsons, Hage went on to work for Paris-based Croatian-German designer Damir Doma. Working with him and seeing the success he managed at a young age pushed her to start her own brand.

=== Nour Hage ===
Since launching her eponymous brand in 2013, she initially focussed on womenswear, pivoting to menswear after a move to London in 2016.

In the early part of her career, Hage often stated that her style is heavily influenced by the Japanese wabi-sabi aesthetic & philosophy, the belief that things shouldn't be perfect, which can be seen in the asymmetry of her designs, and the materials and textiles she uses. She has been noted for her artisanal approach and the craftsmanship of her pieces.

In recent years, her focus has turned to research-based design focused on finding stories in Arab and Middle Eastern heritage and culture, with her designs being described as "reinventing Arab menswear". Her design practice focuses on contemporary reimagining of traditional Arab menswear, including abayas, traditional shirts and thawbs.

In 2014, Hage was featured as one of the ten up-and-coming designers in Lebanon during the Newcomer's Exhibit at Beirut Design Week. In May 2015, Hage was listed amongst the 5 Lebanese designers reshaping the Beirut fashion scene by CNN, who noted that "Hage's designs diverge from the pretty, polished effect that many Lebanese women prefer."

She has frequently collaborated with leading Arab and South Asian artists, especially musicians, dressing them for performances. Her work has been worn by actor Riz Ahmed, and Mashrou' Leila, amongst others.

=== Textile Art ===
In 2019, Hage took her first leap into textile art with a group show at Dr. Johnson's House with a piece entitled 'Sultana Isabel', commissioned by the House and the Arab British Center. Her piece, an Elizabethan ruff died with indigo and turmeric, was a response to Samuel Johnson's play 'Irene' and a reevaluation of historic ties between England at the Arab and Islamic worlds.

In 2020, she took part in the Haramacy residency at The Albany in London.

A fellowship at the V&A Museum was announced in early 2020, where she will be exploring the museum's collection of textiles from the Middle East. The date of the fellowships is to be confirmed.

Her digital work ties into the rest of her practice, by being tied to research into Middle Eastern art, culture and identities as well as incorporating digitized textiles.

=== Other work ===
She also teaches a knitting course at The Creative Space, a free education space in Beirut launched by fellow Parsons graduate Sarah Hermez.

== Awards ==
=== Design awards ===
In November 2014, Hage was awarded the Boghossian Foundation Prize which includes a monetary grant and a residency at the foundation's headquarters at the Villa Empain in Brussels. The jury unanimously selected Hage because “she works [her] fabric with much precision and preciosity.”

== Personal life ==
Hage is married to British-Lebanese writer and producer Nasri Atallah.
