= Improv =

Improv may refer to:

- Improvisation, an act of spontaneous invention
  - Improvisational theatre, usually improvisational comedy
  - Musical improvisation, improvisation of music
- The Improv, a chain of U.S. comedy clubs
- The Improv (TV series), a comedy TV show in Bangalore
- Lotus Improv, a spreadsheet program

== See also ==
- Improvisations (disambiguation)
