= Fixer (TV series) =

2020 British-Lebanese television series

- Genre: Action Comedy
- Created by: Firas Abou Fakher; Daniel Habib
- Written by: Firas Abou Fakher; Daniel Habib
- Directed by: Mark Eid; Zahi Farah
- Starring: Badih Abou Chakra; Diamand Bou Abboud; Wissam Saliba; Sara Abi Kanaan; Zeina Makki; Maritta Hallani
- Theme music composer: Firas Abou Fakher
- Countries of origin: United Kingdom, Lebanon, United Arab Emirates
- Original languages: Arabic, English
- No. of series: 1
- No. of episodes: 8

Production
- Executive producers: Firas Abou Fakher; Daniel Habib; Nasri Atallah
- Production locations: Beirut, Lebanon; London, United Kingdom
- Camera setup: Single-camera
- Running time: 16-18 minutes
- Production company: Last Floor Productions

Original release
- Network: Shahid, MBC Group, MBC4
- Release: 8 December 2020

Fixer (Alternative Arabic title فكسر) is a British-Lebanese action comedy television series created by Firas Abou Fakher and Daniel Habib as a Shahid Original for MBC Group. It premiered on 8 December 2020.

== Premise ==
Tony Tabet is a celebrity fixer living in Beirut. Whenever an Arab celebrity has a problem, he's the solution. Now he wants out to reconnect with his son and leave the business behind. He's got one month left on the job, but doubts he can ever really leave.

== Cast ==
- Badih Abou Chakra as Tony Tabet
- Diamand Bou Abboud as Sarah
- Wissam Saliba as Mike
- Sara Abi Kanaan as Maya
- Maritta Hallani as herself

== Production ==
Fixer was commissioned from Last Floor Productions a Shahid Original for MBC Group’s Shahid streaming platform, the largest in the Middle East. Filming took place in Beirut. It is the second Shahid Original created by Last Floor Productions.

== Release date ==
Fixer was released on 8 December 2020 on Shahid.
