= Samir Atallah =

Lebanese journalist

Samir Atallah (Arabic: سمير عطاالله) (born 24 June 1941) is a Lebanese journalist, author and political analyst.

== Life ==
Samir Atallah was born near Jezzine, Lebanon in a small village called Bteddine El Loqch. Atallah is married to May Francis, from a Southern town called (Mieh ou Mieh) near Saida and has two children, Nasri and Maria. He resides in Beirut. His son Nasri Atallah is also a writer, and works in the digital media field.

== Journalism and literary career ==
Atallah writes a daily column in the Arab newspaper Asharq Al-Awsat and a weekly editorial in the Lebanese daily An-Nahar. He is a regular guest on Lebanese and Arab television and radio stations as a political and social commentator. Atallah has written his daily column in Asharq Al-Awsat since 1987 and has been with An Nahar in various roles intermittently since the late 1950s. He has been the paper's correspondent in various European capitals as well as correspondent to the United Nations.

Atallah was also managing editor of Al-Anba in Kuwait, editor-in-chief of Al-Sayad in London and Al Osbo' il Arabi in Beirut.

He is the author of a number of novels, historical books and travelogues. In a career spanning five decades, he has met and interviewed many leading figures in the contemporary world from Margaret Thatcher and Jacques Chirac to Indira Gandhi and Queen Elizabeth II.

== Decorations and awards ==
Atallah was awarded the Order of Merit (Lebanon) medal by President Michel Suleiman in June 2013 for his contribution to Lebanese journalism and literature.

In 2008, he was awarded the Newspaper Column Award by Sheikh Mohammed bin Rashid Al Maktoum during a ceremony at the Arab Media Forum in Dubai.

== Published works ==
- The Village Years (in English)
- Traveler Without A Port (Moussafir Bila Mina' - Published in London)
- The Pistachio Salesman (Ba'ee al Fustok - Published in Beirut)
- Journeys in the Lands of Others (Masafat fi Awtan al Akhareen - Published by Dar An Nahar, Beirut)
- On People and Cities (Nass wa Moudoun - Published by Dar Al Hani)
- The Ink Caravan (Qafilat al Hibr - Published by Saqi Books, London)
- The Generals of the Levant (Generalat al Sharq - Published by Saqi Books, London)
- Sinbad's Diary (Awraq al Sindibad - Published by Dar Al Hadr)
- Youmna (Published by Dar An Nahar)
