= Nasri Atallah =

British-Lebanese writer (born 1982)

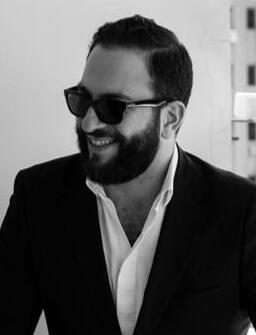
- Atallah in 2013
- Born: 12 November 1982 (age 43); London, England
- Education: American University of Beirut (BA); School of Oriental and African Studies (MSc)
- Occupations: Writer, producer
- Notable work: Our Man in Beirut; Doubt; Fixer
- Title: Editor-in-Chief, Esquire Middle East
- Spouse: Nour Hage (m. 2015)
- Website: nasriatallah.com

Nasri Atallah (Arabic: نصري عطالله; [ˈnɑsˤriː ʕɑtˤɑɫˈɫɑːh]; born 12 November 1982) is a British-Lebanese writer and film/television producer. He is the editor-in-chief of Esquire Middle East, Esquire Saudi and Esquire Qatar. He is the Head of Content at SRMG and a co-founder of Last Floor Productions.

== Biography ==
Nasri Atallah was born and raised in London. He attended Lycée Français Charles de Gaulle. His father, Samir Atallah is a Lebanese journalist and author.

In 1997, Atallah moved to Beirut where he completed his secondary education and attended the American University of Beirut, studying politics. Atallah later earned a Master’s degree in International Politics from the School of Oriental and African Studies (SOAS), University of London. His master's thesis focused on the deterritorialization of identity through transnational media.

== Career ==
Atallah’s early career included work at the United Nations Development Programme. He then worked in energy research and wealth management. In 2009 he shifted into roles in advertising, content creation, and production.

Working at J. Walter Thompson as a copywriter, Atallah opened a blog titled "Our Man in Beirut", which resulted in a publishing deal with Turning Point Books, with a print version released in December 2011.

Between 2011 to 2017, Atallah was head of media at a creative agency focused on cultural production in the Middle East, including music, publishing, and film.

== Last Floor Productions ==
In late 2019, he co-founded Last Floor Productions with Firas Abou Fakher, a band member and composer from Mashrou' Leila, and Daniel Habib, a writer and screenwriting professor at the Lebanese Academy of Fine Arts. Last Floor Productions creates films and television programmes focused on stories about Arabs worldwide. The company's first production, the 10-episode psychological thriller Doubt, was written, shot, and released entirely during the early phase of the coronavirus lockdown in 2020. It was produced as a Shahid Original for the streaming service launched by MBC Group. Later in 2020, Last Floor Productions released a second TV series for Shahid, an 8-episode action comedy titled Fixer. The company has also created short documentaries for Apple and the Victoria & Albert Museum.

== Other work ==
In August 2022, Atallah was appointed Editor-in-Chief of Esquire Middle East by ITP Media Group.

== Filmography ==
Year	Title	Director	Writer	Producer
2015	RKOD	No	No	Executive
2020	Aziza	No	Yes	Yes
2020	Doubt	No	Yes	Executive
2020	Fixer	No	No	Executive
2020	Apple: Illuminating Creativity Series	No	Yes	Executive
2021	V&A: Jameel Prize 6 – From Poetry to Politics	No	Yes	Executive
2022	It Gets Darker	No	No	Executive
2025	The Long Away Game	No	No	Executive
2025	Swim Sistas	No	No	Executive

== Books ==
- A Lost Summer: Postcards From Lebanon (Contributor) (Saqi Books, 2008) ISBN 978-0863566868
- Our Man in Beirut (Turning Point Books, 2011) ISBN 978-9953021102
- Share This Book (Contributor) (SHARE Foundation, 2013)
- Beyrouth, Chroniques et détours by Mashallah News and AMI Collective (Foreword) (Tamyras Éditions, 2014) ISBN 9782360860517
- Haramacy: A collection of essays prescribed by voices from the Middle East, South Asia and the diaspora (Contributor) (Unbound Books, 2022) ISBN 978-1800181328

== Personal life ==
Atallah is married to the Lebanese fashion designer, Nour Hage. They have been together since 2013.
