= Improvisations (disambiguation) =

Improvisations are activities, of making and creating, in the moment and in response to the stimulus of one's immediate environment.

Improvisations may also refer to:

- Improvisations (Charles Hayward and Thurston Moore album), 2017
- Improvisations (Ran Blake & Jaki Byard album), 1981
- Improvisations (Ravi Shankar album), 1962
- Improvisations (Roscoe Mitchell album), 2013
- Improvisations (Stéphane Grappelli album), 1956
