= Paranormal (TV series) =

Egyptian television series

- ما وراء الطبيعة
- Genre: Supernatural; Drama; Horror; Thriller
- Based on: Ma Wara' al-Tabi'a by Ahmed Khaled Tawfik
- Written by: Ahmed Khaled Tawfik
- Directed by: Amr Salama; Majid Al Ansari
- Starring: Ahmed Amin; Reem Abd El Kader; Samma Ibrahim; Razane Jammal; Aya Samaha
- Composer: Khaled Al Kammar
- Country of origin: Egypt
- Original language: Arabic
- No. of seasons: 1
- No. of episodes: 6

Production
- Executive producers: Mohamed Hefzy; Amr Salama
- Producers: Netflix; Walid Al-Sabbagh
- Cinematography: Ahmed Bashary
- Editors: Ahmed Hafez; Ahmed Yousry
- Running time: 46–55 minutes
- Production company: Filmclinic

Original release
- Network: Netflix
- Release: 5 November 2020

Paranormal (Arabic: ما وراء الطبيعة) is an Egyptian supernatural-horror drama television series based on Ahmed Khaled Tawfik's best-selling supernatural book series Ma Waraa Al Tabiaa. The series first premiered on Netflix on November 5, 2020. Paranormal is Netflix's first original Egyptian Arabic-language series and the third Middle Eastern Netflix original series, following Jinn.

Directed by Amr Salama and Majid Al Ansari, late author Ahmed Khaled Tawfik's book series comes to life in this adaptation, starring Ahmed Amin, Reem Abd El Kader, Samma Ibrahim, Razane Jammal, and Aya Samaha. The show received high viewership in the first days of its release, as it quickly made its way up the ranks to become the number one most watched show in the "Top Ten in Egypt Today" list. Paranormal is still ranked number one in Egypt and was ranked amongst the top ten most watched shows in several countries around the world. The series became the first Egyptian program to reach Netflix's Worldwide Top 10 charts, peaking at #7 (though it lasted on the top 10 for only 8 days).

== Synopsis ==
Refaat Ismail is a skeptical Egyptian hematologist at the university of Cairo. He has a dark sense of humor and considers himself unlucky. In the late 1960s, he meets Maggie, a friend from his youth while he was studying in Scotland. Dr. Refaat encounters a series of supernatural events as he attempts to unravel the mysteries behind each unique and unusual case in a world full of mysterious events that he himself experiences, or ones that are narrated to him. As a counter to his scientific work, Refaat faces local mythology, global folk tales, and his own health issues. Dr. Refaat grows to question his strong scientific convictions after these paranormal experiences, and he and Maggie attempt to save their loved ones.

The first season consists of six standalone episodes, each about a famous urban legend mentioned in the Ma Wara' al-Tabi'a novel series. All are interconnected through a recurring element, the Khadrawy House. While investigating these mysteries, Refaat coins eponymous laws based on Murphy's law to at first deny the paranormal, then to understand it.

== Cast and characters ==
- Ahmed Amin as Refaat Ismail, a cynical Egyptian hematologist and professor residing in Cairo. He narrates his experiences with paranormal events that he refuses to believe. Skinny, bald and suffers various health issues.
- Reem Abd El Kader as Shiraz Elkhadrawy, the girl Refaat loved during his childhood, only to discover that she was a ghost. She stalks his old friends and their families to lead him to what she wants.
- Samma Ibrahim as Raeefa Ismail, Refaat's older sister and Talaat's wife.
- Razane Jammal as Maggie Mckillop, Refaat's university colleague from Scotland, whom he happens to still have feelings for. She comes back to Egypt for a visit.
- Aya Samaha as Huwaida Abdel Moniem, Refaat's fiancée. Refaat is at first too timid to break up with her but does so after saving her from a mummy's curse.
- Rushdi Al Shami as Reda Ismail, Refaat's older brother.
- Batea Khalil as Talaat, Raeefa's husband.
- Abdelsamee Abdallah as Kamal
- Adam Wahdan as Taha
- Fatima AlBanawi as Nargis
- Heba El Dessouky as Tayseer, Samah, the Naiad

== Development ==
News of Paranormal first came to light in the summer of 2020. The Paranormal series is the best-selling series of fictional books in the Arab world, with more than 15 million copies sold by the author Ahmed Khaled Tawfik. Paranormal is Netflix's first foray into Egyptian drama. Being brought to life and produced by both Mohamed Hefzy and Amr Salama.

"Staying true to the books, Paranormal, filmed in Egypt will see an all-Egyptian crew, that will reflects Netflix's commitment to creating authentic Egyptian content for global audiences to enjoy. The series will also bring to life the supernatural, using powerful post production and visual effects (VFX) techniques to complement cast performances." - Amr Salama, producer and director.

Egyptian actor and writer Ahmed Amin plays the lead role of Refaat Ismail.

"Put simply, Dr. Refaat Ismail is an anti-hero. An ordinary and frail man, he resonated with readers because he was unlike the usual trope of a hero in Arabic literature. “He doesn’t have any typical hero characteristics,” explains Amin. "He has a dark sense of humour, is very sarcastic and, ultimately, is very lonely person. He would never consider himself a hero, and – most importantly – doesn’t consider himself a believer in the paranormal." - Ahmed Amin, lead role.

== Episodes ==
=== Season 1 ===
No.	Title	Directed by	Written by	Original release date
1	"The Myth of the House"	Amr Salama	Amr Salama	November 5, 2020
At a birthday party given by Refaat's fiancée, Huwaida, two loves from Refaat's past resurface: Maggie, a colleague from Scotland, and the ghost of young girl named Shiraz.
2	"The Myth of the Curse of the Pharaoh"	Majid Al Ansari	Mahmoud Ezzat	November 5, 2020
Refaat investigates a mummy's curse that has caused darkness over Egypt and a strange plague.
3	"The Myth of the Guardian of The Cave"	Majid Al Ansari	Dina Maher	November 5, 2020
To save Huwaida from the mummy's curse, Refaat, Maggie, and their colleague Louis search the Libyan Desert for a rare flower guarded by a mythological beast. Louis reads Refaat's past and future via tarot cards.
4	"The Myth of the Naiad"	Majid Al Ansari	Omar Khaled	November 5, 2020
Refaat investigates a naiad who has apparently killed several men in his hometown, including his brother.
5	"The Myth of the Incubus"	Amr Salama	Mahmoud Ezzat	November 5, 2020
Refaat suffers further health issues as he investigates Shiraz, who he suspects is behind his problems. In lucid dreams, he chases her through a maze.
6	"The Myth of the House: The Return"	Amr Salama	Dina Maher	November 5, 2020
Refaat learns that Shiraz died as a child while trying to escape from her abusive family. Shiraz reveals that she has been helping Refaat and delivers a final warning: that Lucifer is behind his tragedies. Louis sends a letter to Refaat containing a tarot card and says he is glad that Refaat is still alive.

== Release date ==
Paranormal was released on 5 November 2020 on Netflix.

== Reception ==
Den of Geek praised Ahmed Amin's performance and said that he is "never less than completely watchable", though the show is occasionally hokey.
