= Nabil Farouk =

Egyptian novelist (1956–2020)

Nabil Farouk Ramadan Bayoumi Ramadan
- نبيل فاروق رمضان بيومي رمضان
- Born: Nabil Farouk Ramadan Bayoumi Ramadan; February 9, 1956; Tanta, Gharbia Governorate, Egypt
- Died: December 9, 2020 (aged 64); Cairo, Cairo Governorate, Egypt
- Citizenship: Egypt
- Education: Tanta University
- Occupations: Novelist, author & poet
- Spouse: Mervat Ragheb (m. 1985; died 2020)
- Children: 3
- Writing career
- Language: Arabic
- Genres: Spy fiction; detective fiction; science fiction
- Notable works: Ragol Al Mostaheel; Malaf Al Mostakbal

Nabil Farouk Ramadan Bayoumi Ramadan (Arabic: نبيل فاروق رمضان بيومي رمضان) (9 February 1956 – 9 December 2020) was an Egyptian novelist. best known for his books in the Rewayāt Masreyya Lel Gēb (Egyptian Pocket Novels) series.

He was born in the Egyptian city of Tanta, and first showed an interest in reading at a very young age. With the encouragement of his parents, he made his first attempts at writing at the age of about thirteen, and in high school joined journalism, photography, and theatre workgroups.

He received his Bachelor of Medicine, Bachelor of Surgery from the University of Tanta in 1980. Just a year before his graduation, he received an award from the Cultural Centre of Tanta for his novel The Prophecy, which was later published as the first book of his Cocktail 2000 series.

He started writing Rewayat by following an advertisement in the World of Books magazine, saying that the Modern Arab Association was seeking science fiction novelists. He submitted his novel Ray of Death, and it was published a year later as the first book in Malaf Al Mostakbal (The Future File) series. Soon afterwards, he started on his other main series of novels, Ragol Al Mostaheel (The Man of the Impossible), which is said to be based on the actual exploits of an Egyptian Central Intelligence agent called A.S. (alias: Adham Sabri).

He was a doctor, but was not practising medicine, being devoted full-time to his writing. Other than his series, he wrote articles for two newspapers and three magazines, and started working on scripts for television series after finishing two films scripts, with a third one in progress. A new novel of (The Man of the Impossible) (Ragol Al Mostaheel) will be released titled ن-٣, which in arabic symbolizes the third best hero in the general intelligence, through which ن-٣ will reveal, with his unique skills and exceptional abilities, the answers to many questions related to the previous issues.

== Series ==
- Ragol Al Mostaheel (The Man of the Impossible).
- Malaf Al Mostakbal (The Future Archive).
- Cocktail 2000.
- Fares Al Andalus (The Knight of Andalusia).
- Harb Al jwasees (The War Of The Spies).
- Zohoor (Flowers)
- Saif Al Adala (The sword of justice)
- Moghamarat ʽayn × 2 (Adventures ×2)

== See also ==
- List of Egyptian writers
