= Tanta University =

Public university in Egypt

Coordinates: 30°47′32″N 30°59′57″E

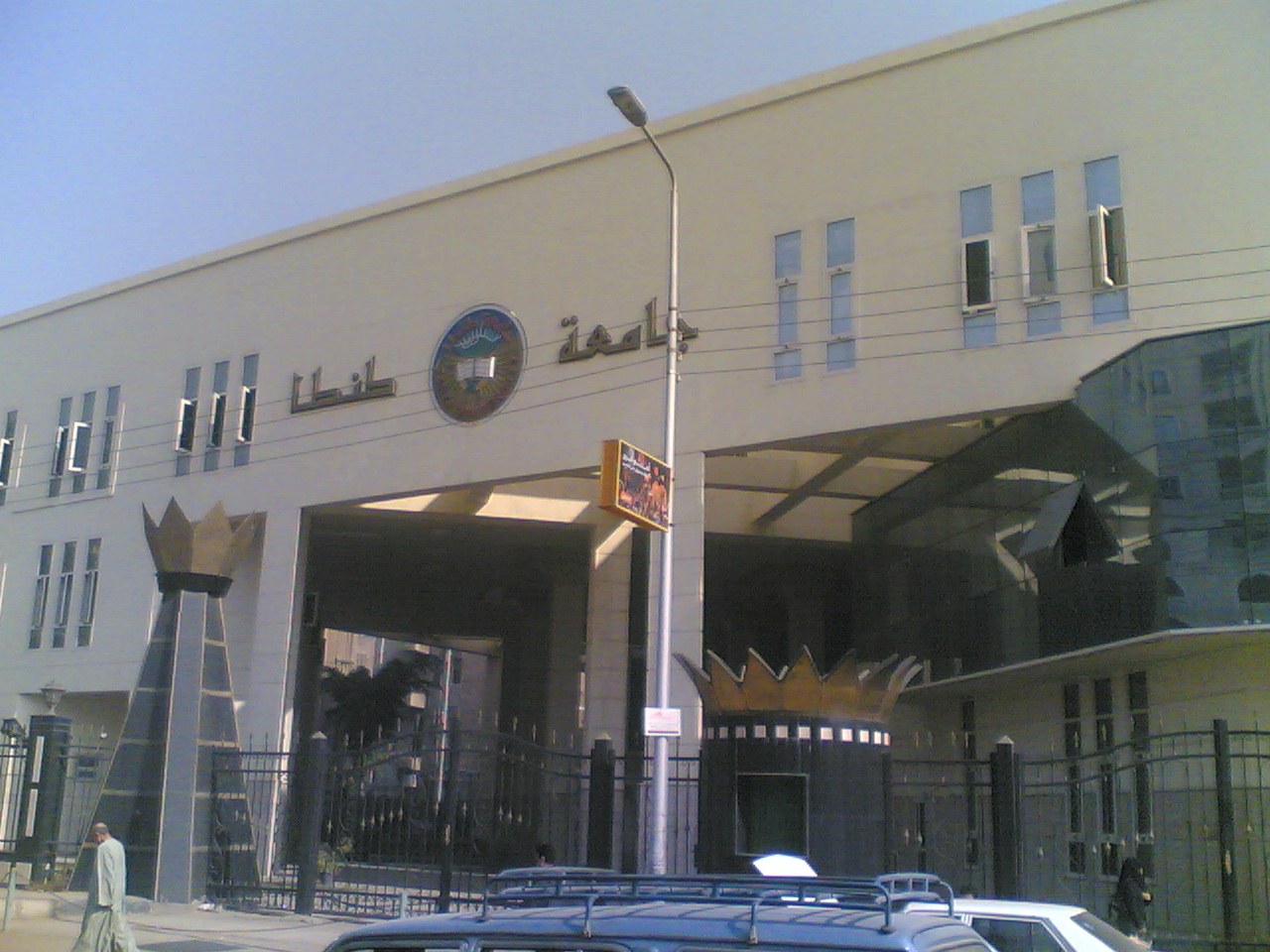
- Type: Public university
- Established: 1972; 54 years ago
- President: Mohamed Hussein Mahmoud
- Location: Tanta, Gharbia, Egypt
- Website: www.tanta.edu.eg

University rankings

Global – Overall
- QS World: 1201–1400 (2024)
- THE World: 1001–1200 (2024)
- USNWR Global: =835 (2023)

Tanta University (Arabic: جامعة طنطا) is an Egyptian university in the city of Tanta, Gharbia, Egypt. The university is under the direct scientific supervision of the Ministry of Higher Education. Founded in 1962 as a branch from the University of Alexandria.

At the time the university was founded, it contained the faculty of Medicine only and then it became an independent university named University of the Middle Delta in 1972. The university had at that time Medicine, Science, Agriculture and Education faculties. The university's name was changed into Tanta University in 1973. The 2023 classification, as this year it advanced 54 places from last year and came in the 1328th place globally among the 2000 participating international universities. The university also advanced to the eighth place locally instead of the tenth place, among the 20 Egyptian universities participating in this classification.

== Faculties ==
- Faculty of Medicine (1962)
- Faculty of Science (1977)
- Faculty of Education in Tanta (1977)
- Faculty of Agriculture in Kafr ash Shaykh (1977)
- Faculty of Engineering (1977)
- Faculty of Law (1981)
- High Institute of Nursing (1982)
- Faculty of Veterinary Medicine (1982)
- Faculty of Agriculture in Tanta (1992)
- Faculty of Physical Education (1994)
- Faculty of Dentistry (1977)
- Faculty of Pharmacy
- Faculty of Arts (1975)
- Faculty of Computer and Informatics (2019)
- Faculty of Commerce

== The University's branch in Kafr ash Shaykh ==
The university's branch in Kafr ash Shaykh was constituted in 1983. It has Education, Agriculture, Specific Education, Veterinary Medicine, Commerce, Engineering and Arts faculties.

In 2006, Kafr ash Shaykh branch separated from the Tanta university to become an independent university under the name of Kafr ash Shaykh University in Kafr ash Shaykh city and it now has Education, Agriculture, Specific Education, Veterinary Medicine, Commerce, Engineering, Physical Education and Arts faculties.

== Number of students ==
The number of students in Tanta University
Faculty	Total students	Females percentage
Faculty of Pharmacy	3844	51%
Faculty of Dentistry	749	51%
High Institute of Nursing	1398	100%
Faculty of Education	3254	38%
Faculty of Agriculture in Tanta	297	37%
Faculty of Education in Tanta	13528	72%
Faculty of Commerce in Tanta	17257	33%
Faculty of Specific Education in Tanta	2377	70%
Faculty of Education in Kafr ash Shaykh	1738	66%
Faculty of Medicine	3644	44%
Faculty of Science	9186	87%
Faculty of Arts	14608	46%
Faculty of Agriculture in Kafr ash Shaykh	1015	31%
Faculty of Education in Kafr ash Shaykh	8482	61%
Faculty of Engineering in Kafr ash Shaykh	1359	20%
Faculty of Veterinary Medicine in Kafr ash Shaykh	1076	35%
Faculty of Commerce in Kafr ash Shaykh	5210	32%
Faculty of Arts in Kafr ash Shaykh	5177	49%
Faculty of Law in Kafr ash Shaykh	12644	31%
Faculty of Engineering in Tanta	3333	28%
total	110,176	49.7%

== Notable alumni ==
- Eman Ghoneim
- Nabil Farouk
- Ahmad Khaled Tawfeq
- El Sayed El Quseir
- Bassem Amin

== See also ==
- List of Islamic educational institutions
- Education in Egypt
- Egyptian universities
- List of Egyptian universities
- Abdel Aziz Elbadry Portfolio
