= Malaf Al Mostakbal =

- Author: Nabil Farouk
- Country: Egypt
- Language: Arabic
- Discipline: science fiction
- Publisher: Modern Arab Association
- Published: 1984-2009
- No. of books: 160

Malaf Al Mostakbal (Arabic: ملف المستقبل) (also transliterated as Malaf al Mustaqbal) (The Future File) has been the title of an Egyptian science fiction series of novels written by Nabil Farouk and published by Modern Arab Association as a part of Rewayat since the year 1984. 160 titles were published from 1984 to 2009.

== Plot summary ==
The events of the series happen in the not so distant future. Starting December 28, 2000 as stated vaguely in the very first issue, The Death Ray (أشعة الموت), which was published in 1984. In that era a fictional Egyptian Scientific Intelligence Agency (ESIA) (المخابرات العلمية المصرية) is protecting Egypt from numerous threats.

The series begins when the main character, Nour El Deen Mahmoud (then a Lieutenant (ملازم)), is summoned by the High Commander of Scientific Intelligence for a secret mission to locate a newly developed death ray device which had been stolen from the agency. For this mission, Nour was assigned to head a team of scientists who would form the core team of main characters for the series: communications engineer Salwa, psychiatrist Ramzy, and radiation scientist Mahmoud.

For some time, the team is focused solely on solving mysteries which require them to draw on both their policing and scientific skills. As the series progresses, Nour and Salwa get married (Issue #13: Lost Time (الزمن المفقود)). They have a daughter, Nashwa, who becomes the team's computer expert after her growth is artificially accelerated to adulthood as part of an alien weapons' test (Issue #63: The Inflamed Ocean (المحيط الملتهب)).

A key milestone in the series takes place during a five-part storyline (Issues #76-80), in which the Earth is occupied by an alien warrior race from the planet Glorial (جلوريال). In the initial invasion (Issue #76: Invasion (الاحتلال)), Glorial's armies destroy nearly all of Earth's most significant military, scientific, and cultural assets and landmarks. Nour and his team lead an international resistance movement which, after a year-long campaign, liberates the Earth (Issue #80: Victory (النصر)).

The storylines following the liberation often focused on the struggle for power between different countries and factions in the aftermath of Earth's scientific and cultural devastation, with Egypt becoming the world's leader in science and technology. During this period, Egypt's Scientific Intelligence is re-constituted under a new High Commander, and Nour's team resumes its mystery-solving work. Another milestone in the series takes place when the team travels to the planet Arghoran (أرغوران) to help liberate it from Glorial's occupation. This was the fulfillment of a promise Nour had made to Bodon (بودون), an Arghorian who once tried to lead his planet to occupy Earth (Issue #58: Battle of the Planets (معركة الكواكب)), but later died in the effort to liberate Earth from Glorial's occupation (Issue #78: Struggle (الصراع)). While they succeed in liberating Arghoran and returning to Earth, the team disbands after Mahmoud apparently dies (Issue #100: Time = Zero (الزمن = صفر)), and Salwa becomes pregnant.

At the behest of the High Commander, Nour continues his work for Scientific Intelligence as part of a new, two-man team with Akram, a rogue fighter and ally of the team whom Nour and Ramzy first encountered in the aftermath of Earth's liberation (Issue #81: Symbol of Power (رمز القوة)). Shortly thereafter, however, the original team, absent Mahmoud, was re-constituted with Akram as the newest member. It also became increasingly clear to the team members that Mahmoud had not died, but that his consciousness was trapped in an unknown dimension from which he occasionally managed to communicate with and assist his former comrades. In its current form, the team continues to solve increasingly complex scientific mysteries, often involving time travel, as well as interstellar and inter-dimensional travels and encounters.

== Characters ==
Nour

Nour El Deen Mahmoud (Arabic: نور الدين محمود نور الدين) is an agent of the ESIA. He is characterized with an outstanding ability to solve mysteries. According to the series, Nour is born in 1976. His father is a policeman. In 2000 at the age of 24, he forms his own team consisting of: Salwa, Ramzy and Mahmoud, a group of experts in different fields. He marries Salwa in novel 13 and they had a daughter - Nashwa - later in the series as well.

Through the novels, Nour travels to the past and future many times. He also travels in space to other planets and even worlds in other dimensions. According to the novels Nour is highly trained on martial arts and in many novels Nour had to use his language skills such as Hebrew in novel 16 and French and German in novel 119.

Salwa

Salwa Mansour is a communication expert. She marries Nour and gives birth to their daughter, Nashwa.

Ramzy

Ramzy is a psychiatrist. He joins Nour's teams from the first book, and he later marries Mosheera Mahfooz (journalist). Ramzy and Mosheera gets a divorce later after a short while of being married to Ramzi, Ramzy falls in love with Nour's daughter: Nashwa and marries her. They called their son Mahmoud as a reminder of their friend Mahmoud who thought to be dead in book 100 to save the team.

Mahmoud

Mahmoud is a radiation expert. He was thought to be dead since book 100 but he turns out to be alive and trapped in a time tunnel later in the series.

Nashwa

Nashwa is Nour and Salwa's daughter. She went through some alien tests (Atlantis) which boosted her growth rate rapidly which made her an adult in a short period of time. She is the team's computer expert and later she marries Ramzy in book 101.

Akram

Akram an engineer. He meets up with Nour's the team in book 81. He becomes one of the team starting book 101. Akram doesn't like modern technology and loves his old style pistol.

Tarek

Tarek is a time traveler from the future who joins the team in book 115. In book 155 all the team members travel to the future where Tarek joins them again. In the same book, it is revealed that Tarek is the grandson of Nour and the son of Nashwa and Ramzy.

Mohamed Hejazy

Dr. Mohamed Hejazy is a physician and a friend of Nour's.

Mosheera

Mosheera Mahfouz a newspaper reporter. She marries Ramzy in book 52 and gets divorced in book 60. She falls in love with Akram and they get married in book 101.

Seen Tamantashar X-18

Seen Tamantashar is a super robot that was manufactured thousands of years ago by the people of Atlantis. He saves the team many times through the novels.

== Themes ==
=== Egyptian and Arab Nationalism ===
Part of the premise of the series is that, in the future, Egypt becomes the a leading but peaceful world power. In various stories, Farouk regularly emphasizes the patriotism of his characters, and their willingness to make considerable sacrifices for Egypt. Additionally, a number of the stories in the series touch on the themes of pan-Arab solidarity, with Nour and his team members encountering and collaborating with a number of characters from different Arab countries. In these interactions, a sense of fraternity and comradeship between the Egyptians and other Arabs is emphasized.

Beyond this, Farouk's stories often include strong criticisms of countries that are unpopular in Egypt and the Arab world today, most notably: the United States, Great Britain, and Israel. In the future which Farouk posits, these countries are shown to be strongly resentful of Egypt's success. The team confronts Israeli spies during numerous stories, and in one notable storyline, Akram goes up against a British spy called James Bradley (Issue #92: The Terrible Journey (الرحلة الرهيبة)), whose character is a ruthless and amoral version of the famous fictional British spy James Bond. The United States is often described as a country that deals only in the logic of military strength and force.

=== Faith and Religion ===
The heroes of the series are regularly shown to be people of strong faith in God. At times when a character is caught in a seemingly hopeless predicament, he or she will call on God, and a way out will present itself. On one mission, the team encounters an alien race living under the surface of the Moon (Issue #48: Prison of the Moon (سجن القمر)), who turn out to be a monotheistic society. A nemesis of Nour who appears in a number of storylines is the half-human son of the Devil (first introduced in Issue #72: The Devil's Son (ابن الشيطان)).

== See also ==
- List of titles of Malaf Al Mostakbal series
