= Ragol Al Mostaheel =

Book series by Nabil Farouk

Ragjol Al Mostaheel
- Author: Nabil Farouk
- Country: Egypt
- Language: Arabic
- Discipline: action series - Police
- Publisher: Modern Arab Association
- Published: 1984-2009
- No. of books: 160

Ragol Al Mostaheel (Arabic: رجل المستحيل) (also transliterated as Rajul al Mustaheel) (The Man of the Impossible) is an action-book series written by Egyptian author Nabil Farouk and published by the Modern Arab Association as a part of Rewayat. 160 titles were published from 1984 to 2009.

The novels' main protagonist, Adham Sabry Muhammad Al Masry, is a secret agent for the Egyptian Intelligence and a highly trained military commando, employing mixed martial art techniques into his style, and is often involved in espionage missions that would be deemed impossible. He is also in love with his military colleague Mona Tawfeek and is in a constant struggle against his nemesis Sonia David Graham, who is also in love with Adham. Adham's portrait and all other's Ragol Al Mostaheel characters were inspired by the renowned Egyptian artist Ismail Diab.

Among the most famous literary figures in the Arabic language, readers of the popular series in the Middle East think of Adham Sabry as the Egyptian counterpart of Ian Fleming's James Bond.

== Adham Sabry ==
Adham Sabry (Arabic: أدهم صبرى, IPA: [ˈʔædhæm sˤɑbɾi]) is the main character in Ragol Al Mostaheel series. His father was one of the first agents of the Egyptian GID, and trained him from an early age in martial arts, foreign languages and firearm handling. He later joined the military, eventually joining the Egyptian commando unit where he attained the rank of captain. He later joined the Egyptian General Intelligence Directorate, where he was given the Nickname 'The Impossible Man' and Codename (Arabic: ن-1, nūn wāħed), due to the occasions where he has performed feats that yielded valuable returns for the directorate in the face of insurmountable odds, an example of which is his first mission in which he managed to steal valuable information from the KGB and then escaped back to Egypt with no help or reinforcements.

Unlike some western models, i.e. Ian Fleming's Bond, Adham Sabry is a model of a man with religious and ethical system combination, where some certain situations being dealt with in a total different manner than usual. Sabry never drinks alcohol, never involves in sexual relationships outside the border of marriage; and committed to prayer times.

Sabry's model represents high nobility principals joined by high professionalism; he never shoots in the back, never beats women or hurts them, normally, he never kills.

He has been teamed up with his long partner Mona Tawfeik whom he later falls in love with but they never marry. He was killed in one of the novels but was again brought back in the next issue. He also lost his memory and was married to his long life rival Sonia Graham, a Mossad agent turned mercenary. The relationship bore a son which has since lost all contact with. A new novel of (The Man of the Impossible) (Ragol Al Mostaheel) will be released titled (ن-٣), which in arabic symbolizes the third best hero in the general intelligence, through which ن-٣ will reveal, with his unique skills and exceptional abilities, the answers to many questions related to the previous issues.

== Titles ==
This is a list of titles of Ragol Al Mostaheel series by Nabil Farouk. 160 titles were published from 1984 to 2009.

1. Al Ekhtefaa Al Ghamed (الاختفاء الغامض) (The Mysterious Disappearance).
2. Sebak Al Mawt (سباق الموت) (The Death Race).
3. kenaa Al Khatar (قناع الخطر) (The Mask of Danger).
4. Saed Al jawassees (صائد الجواسيس) (The Spy Hunter).
5. Al jaleed Al Damy (الجليد الدامي) (The Bloody Ice).
6. Ktal Al Theaab (قتال الذئاب) (The Clash of Wolves).
7. Bareeq Al Mas (بريق الماس) (The Diamond Shine).
8. Ghareem Al Shaytan (غريم الشيطان) (The Devil's Nemesis).
9. Anyab Al Thoaban (أنياب الثعبان) (The Snake's Canine).
10. Al Maal Al Maloon (المال الملعون) (The Cursed Money).
11. Al Moamara Al Khafeyya (المؤامرة الخفية) (The Covert Conspiracy).
12. Holafaa Al Shar (حلفاء الشر) (The Allies of Evil).
13. Ardh Al Ahwaal (أرض الأهوال) (The Land of Terrors).
14. Amaleyyet Mont Carlo (عملية مونت كارلو) (Operation Monte Carlo).
15. Embratoreyyet Al Sem (إمبراطورية السم) (The Empire of Venom).
16. Al Khedaa Al Akheera (الخدعة الأخيرة) (The Last Ruse).
17. Entiqam Al Akraab (انتقام العقرب) (The Revenge of the Scorpion).
18. Kaher Al Amaleqa (قاهر العمالقة) (The Ultimate Victor).
19. Abwab Al jaheem (أبواب الجحيم) (The Gates of Hell).
20. Thaalab Al Tholooj (ثعلب الثلوج) (The Snow Fox).
21. Matheeq Al Neraan (مضيق النيران) (The Terra
22. Assabea Al Damar (أصابع الدمار) (The Fingers of Destruction).
23. Fares Al Loaloa (فارس الؤلؤ) (The Knight of Diamonds).
24. Al Dhabaab Al Katel (الضباب القاتل) (The Deadly Fog).
25. Al Khenjar Al Faddy (الخنجر الفضي) (The Silver Dagger).
26. Akher Al jababera (آخر الجبابرة) (The Last of the Giants).
27. Al jawhara Al Sawdaa (الجوهرة السوداء) (The Black Diamond).
28. Qalb Al Aasefah (قلب العاصفة) (The Heart of the Storm).
29. Al Seraa Al Shaytani (الصراع الشيطاني) (The Clash of Demons).
30. Al Remal Al Mohreka (الرمال المحرقة) (The Scalding Sand).
31. Al Khatwah Al Oolah (الخطوة الأولى) (The First Step).
32. Khayt Al Lahab (خيط اللهب) (The Fireline).
33. Al Kowwah Alif ((القوة (أ) (The Alpha Force).
34. Mard Al Ghadhab (مارد الغضب) (The Raging Giant).
35. Karasenat Al jaww (قراصنة الجو) (The Sky Pirates).
36. Thaeb Al Ahrash (ذئب الأحراش) (The Jungle Wolf).
37. Makhlab Al Shaytan (مخلب الشيطان) (Tha Devil's Claw).
38. Leabet Al Mohtarefeen (لعبة المحترفين) (The Game of Pros).
39. Aamaq Al Khatar (أعماق الخطر) (The Bedrocks of Danger).
40. Mehnaty Al Qatl (مهنتي القتل) (Murder is my Game).
41. Al Entiharyyon (الانتحاريون) (The Kamikaze).
42. Al Hadaf Al Katel (الهدف القاتل) (The Deadly Target).
43. Al Mokhater (المخاطر) (The Stuntman).
44. Al Ein Al Thaletha (العين الثالثة) (The Third Eye).
45. Al Kodban Al Galedeyya (القضبان الجليدية) (The Icey Rails).
46. Laheeb Al Thalg (لهيب الثلج) (The Flames of Ice).
47. Al Rossassa Al Zahabeyya (الرصاصة الذهبية) (The Golden Bullet).
48. Shaytan Al Mafia (شيطان المافيا) (The Mafia's Nightmare).
49. Al Darba Al Kadeya (الضربة القاضية) (The Lethal Strike).
50. Mohemma Khassa (مهمة خاصة) (A Special Mission).
51. Semm Al Kobra (سم الكوبرا) (The Cobra's Venom).
52. Gebal Al Mout (جبال الموت) (The Mountains of Death).
53. Zeaab Wa Demaa (ذئاب و دماء) (Wolves and Blood).
54. Rehlet Al Halak (رحلة الهلاك) (The Death Trip).
55. Afaa Barshlona (أفعى برشلونة) (The Serpent of Barcelona).
56. Al Fahd Al Abyad (الفهد الأبيض) (The White Jaguar).
57. Amaleyyet Al Adghal (عملية الأدغال) (The Jungle Mission).
58. Eadaam Batal (إعدام بطل) (Execution of a Hero).
59. Entqam Shabah (انتقام شبح) (The Wrath of a Ghost).
60. Donna Karoleena (دونا كارولينا) (Dona Carolina).
61. Malaekat Al Gaheem (ملائكة الجحيم) (The Angels of Hell).
62. Malek Al Esabat (ملك العصابات) (The King of Gangs).
63. Al Jassoos (الجاسوس) (The Spy).
64. Taht Al Sefr (تحت الصفر) (Sub-Zero).
65. Al Galeed Al Moshtael (الجليد المشتعل) (The Burning Ice).
66. Alf Wagh (ألف وجه) (A Thousand Faces).
67. Al Gaheem Al Mozdawag (الجحيم المزدوج) (The Double Hell).
68. Kaleet Al Sokoor (قلعة الصقور) (The Castle of Falcons).
69. Agnehet Al Enteqam (أجنحة الانتقام) (The Wings of Revenge).
70. Abateret Al Sharr (أباطرة الشر) (The Emperors of Evil).
71. Ded Al Kanoon (ضد القانون) (Against the Law).
72. Shareeat Al Ghaab (شريعة الغاب) (The Law of the Jungle).
73. Al Motakal Al Raheeb (المعتقل الرهيب) (The Horrific Prison).
74. Al Daera Al Gohannameyya (الدائرة الجهنمية) (The Deadly Perimeter).
75. Aswar Al Gaheem (أسوار الجحيم) (The Fences of Hell).
76. Al Nahr Al Aswad (النهر الأسود) (The Black River).
77. Amaleket Marselya (عمالقة مرسيليا) (The Giants of Marseille).
78. Saharaa Al Damm (صحراء الدم) (The Desert of Blood).
79. Safket Al Mout (صفقة الموت) (The Deal of Death).
80. Wakr Al Erhab (وكر الإرهاب) (The Terror Hideout).
81. Al Ragol Al Akher (الرجل الآخر) (The Other One).
82. Al Akhtoboot (الأخطبوط) (The Octopus).
83. Maaraket Al Kemma (معركة القمة) (The battle of the top).
84. Gazeerat Al Gaheem (جزيرة الجحيم) (The Island of Hell).
85. Lamset Al Sharr (لمسة الشر) (The Touch of Evil).
86. Al Thaalab (الثعلب) (The Fox).
87. Khat Al Mowagaha (خط المواجهة) (The Line of Confrontation).
88. Safeer Al Khatar (سفير الخطر) (The Ambassador of Danger).
89. Kabdet Al Saffah (قبضة السفاح) (The Grasp of the Butcher).
90. Al Hadaf (الهدف) (The Target).
91. Al Wagh Al Khafy (الوجه الخفي) (The Hidden Face).
92. Al Khatar (الخطر) (The Danger).
93. Ard Al Adeww (أرض العدو) (The Land of the Enemy).
94. Katebet Al Damar (كتيبة الدمار) (The Battalion of Destruction).
95. Al Seraa Al Wafshy (الصراع الوحشى) (The Monstrous Fight).
96. Al Maaraka Al Fasela (المعركة الفاصلة) (The Deciding Battle).
97. Al Sakr Al Aama (الصقر الأعمى) (The Blind Falcon).
98. Al Kannas (القناص) (The Hitman).
99. Mazaak Al Damm (مذاق الدم) (The Taste of Blood).
100. Al Darba Al Kassema (الضربة القاصمة) (The Striking Hit).
101. Enkelab (انقلاب) (Revolt).
102. Nahr Al Damm (نهر الدم) (The River of Blood).
103. Al Mohtaref (المحترف) (The Professional).
104. Al Eaassar Al Ahmar (الإعصار الأحمر) (The Red Tornado).
105. Akareb Al Saaa (عقارب الساعة) .
106. Al Afaa (الأفعى) (The Viper)
107. Ettehad Al Katalah (اتحاد القتلة) (The Association of Assassins).
108. Al Fakhkh (الفخ) (The Trap).
109. Kabdet Al Sharr (قبضة الشر) (The Fist of Evil).
110. Eghtyal (اغتيال) (Assassination).
111. Mabad Al Gareema (معبد الجريمة) (The Temple of Crime).
112. Al Fareek Al Aswad (الفريق الأسود) (The Black Team).
113. Reyah Al Khatar (رياح الخطر) (The Winds of Danger).
114. Mamarr Al Gaheem (ممر الجحيم) (The Hell Path).
115. Bela Rahma (بلا رحمة) (No Mercy).
116. Mahragan Al Mout (مهرجان الموت) (The Death Festival).
117. Amaleket Al Gebaal (عمالقة الجبال) (The Giants of the Mountains).
118. Al Aarbaa Al Kebar (الأربعة الكبار) (The Big Four).
119. Foq Al Kemma (فوق القمة) (Over the Top).
120. Al Sanyora (السنيورا) (The Signora).
121. Wagh Al Afaa (وجه الأفعى) (Face of the Snake).
122. Al Assabea Al Zahabeyya (الأصابع الذهبية) (The Golden Fingers).
123. Al Mostaheel (المستحيل) (The Impossible).
124. Al Lamsa Al Akheera (اللمسة الأخيرة) (The Final Touch).
125. Amaleyyet Al Neel (عملية النيل) (The Nile Operation).
126. Saet Al Sefr (ساعة الصفر) (The Zero Hour).
127. Noktet Al Daef (نقطة الضعف) (The Weak Point).
128. Al Sahwa (الصحوة) (The Wakening).
129. Al Karasena (القراصنة) (The Pirates).
130. Moheet Al Damm (محيط الدم) (The Ocean of Blood).
131. Al Hodood (الحدود) (The Borders).
132. Farek Al Mostaheel (فريق المستحيل) (The Impossible Team).
133. Nomoor Al Tholoog (نمور الثلوج) (The Snow Tigers).
134. Al Abtall (الأبطال) (The Heroes).
135. Al Ostaz (الأستاذ) (The Master).
136. Al Moghamara Al Kobra (المغامرة الكبرى) (The Biggest Adventure).
137. Madinet Al Zeaab (مدينة الذئاب) (The City of the Wolves).
138. Al Dahaya (الضحايا) (The Victims).
139. Al Wahsh Al Aadamy (الوحش الآدمى) (The Human Monster).
140. Al Mowagah Al Akheera (المواجهة الأخيرة) (The Final Confrontation).
141. Remal Wa Demaa (رمال و دماء) (Sands and Blood).
142. Ragol Wa Gesh (رجل و جيش) (Man vs. Army).
143. Al Awraq Al Makshofah (الأوراق المكشوفة) (The Uncovered Cards).
144. Al Mohtarefoon (المحترفون) (The Professionals).
145. Al Waraka Al Akheera (الورقة الأخيرة) (The Last Card).
146. Al Maazak (المأزق) (The Trouble).
147. Al Ghameda (الغامضة) (The Mysterious One).
148. Al Khetta Beh ((الخطة (ب) (Plan B).
149. Al Masyada (المصيدة) (The Trap).
150. Al Nehaya (النهاية) (The End).
151. Al Awda (العودة)(The Return).
152. Al kenaa (القناع) (The Mask).
153. Al Ahrash (الأحراش) (The Jungle).
154. Al Harb (الحرب) (The War).
155. Al Erhaab (الإرهاب) (Terrorism).
156. Al Mowagah (المواجهة) (The Confrontation).
157. Al Modarreb (المدرب) (The Coach).
158. Al khotta (الخطة) (The Plan).
159. Al Hogom (الهجوم) (The Attack).
160. Al Wadaa (الوداع) (The Send-off).
