= Ma Wara' al-Tabi'a =

Book series

Paranormal
- Author: Ahmed Khaled Tawfik
- Original title: Ma Wara' al-Tabi'a
- Country: Egypt
- Language: Arabic
- Discipline: horror/thriller
- Publisher: Modern Arab Association
- Published: 1993 to 2014
- No. of books: 81

Ma Wara' al-Tabi'a (Arabic: ما وراء الطبيعة, lit. 'Beyond Nature'), which can be also translated as Metaphysics, Supernatural, or Paranormal, is a series of Egyptian horror and thriller novellas written by Ahmed Khaled Tawfik. The series was first published in 1993 and was concluded in 2014, with 81 novellas published. The series is popular in Egypt and the Middle East, selling upwards of 15 million copies. Due to its popularity, it received the first adaptation of an Egyptian series by Netflix under the title Paranormal, which was released on November 5, 2020.

Set in the 1960s, it follows hematologist Dr. Refaat Ismail become an unwilling expert on paranormal investigations.

== Storyline ==
The series is anthological and does not have an overarching plot, with each installment dealing with a new story or threat, although some plotlines and characters are recurring or are spread over multiple installments. The stories are often told from a first-person perspective, where the protagonist, Refaat (رفعت), is nearing seventy years of age and is recounting and narrating his past supernatural adventures, which he started encountering when in his thirties.

Each installment often covers one story or adventure from Refaat's life. Refaat is often accompanied by secondary characters that aid him on his adventures, some of them recurring.

Occasionally, Refaat will tell stories that focus on other main characters. Stories starring other characters are usually framed as letters that were sent to Refaat from people who have experienced paranormal events, which he found interesting enough to share with the readers. These people, having learned of Refaat's reputation as an expert on the supernatural, decide to mail him their stories either to seek advice or share their peculiar experiences.

All of the stories are of a paranormal nature or are related to the supernatural in one way or another. Some of the supernatural events featured in the stories, especially during the earlier installments, are revealed to have a logical and scientifically compliant explanation. Often, they will turn out to be faked by culprits for personal gain. Despite that, most of the stories in the series do deal with actual supernatural phenomena and events. The stories often end with Refaat solving a mystery, figuring out a clever way to deal with a supernatural threat, or managing to survive a deadly encounter.

One notable feature of the series is that some of the stories end with Refaat not having a full understanding or an explanation for what had transpired, natural or unnatural.

== Style and structure ==
The stories are noted for the character's anti-heroic nature, which was uncommon for Egyptian young adult fiction at the time. Refaat is a cynical and disgruntled hematologist who suffers from various health issues including chronic heart problems, making him an unlikely hero. He is described as an unattractive, disagreeable, and impatient man, although he is kind and idealistic on the inside. He is also described as highly intelligent, skeptical, sarcastic, and deeply cynical. Consequently, the series start with him being a firm denier of the paranormal and end with him becoming a reluctant expert on supernatural phenomena after having been forced to encounter such events.

The writing style and story structure is varied. Towfik often experimented with different writing techniques and story structures. For example, some of the installments are told in fragments, through newspaper clippings, excerpts from diaries, transcripts of interviews, etc.

Despite focusing on horror and thriller, the author has occasionally dabbled with different genres, such as science fiction and fantasy.

The stories sometimes feature multiple POVs.

A distinctive feature of the writing style is sarcasm, which is often heavily featured in the stories. Characters are often cynical and/or very sarcastic.

== Main and recurring characters ==
- Refaat Ismael: The main character. He is an old and disgruntled hematologist who becomes a reluctant expert on the supernatural after a series of unlikely misadventures he underwent in his youth. He is the main protagonist for most of the series' books; however, some of the stories star other characters such as Salem and Salma, although he is often still the narrator for these stories, or, absent that role, the narrator for the frame story.
- Maggie McCaleb: Refaat's love interest. She is the daughter of Refaat's Scottish professor, Sir James McCaleb. She studied physics while Refaat was studying medicine under her father. Maggie is described as intelligent, beautiful, and highly sophisticated. The character makes recurring appearances, with one novella "Ostoratha", translated as Her Myth, centering around her. The story features a serial killer targeting Maggie and Refaat's old university friend group. She and Refaat do not have a relationship, even though they often proclaim their undying love for each other. She was introduced in the third installment.
- Ezzat Sherif: Refaat's next-door neighbor and friend. Ezzat is a sculptor from Alexandria who has some fame and success as a local artist. He is known for his love of art, being unorganized, and his love for his home town. He suffers from Addison's disease which makes him vulnerable to fear and often too weak to deal with the supernatural events thrust upon him due to his friendship with Refaat. He was introduced in the fourth installment.
- Adel Tawfik: Adel is Refaat's school friend who grew up to become a high-ranking police officer. He is described as being hotheaded, ill-tempered, and impatient. Since he is usually preoccupied with police work, he often seeks Refaat's help when dealing with supernatural matters encountered by himself or his fellow officers. He was introduced in the fourth installment.
- Harry Sheldon: He is an American programmer and a close friend of Refaat. He is described as hotheaded and Refaat notes that "he has a tendency to solve problems with his fists". He is married to a woman called Linda and they have a child together. Whenever Refaat travels to the US, Harry is often there to meet and/or host him. He was introduced in the fifth installment.
- Salem and Salma: they are the same person, from alternate universes where Salem was born male and Salma was born female. Salem is from a universe similar to the real world while Salma comes from a timeline that is much more technologically advanced where humanity has managed to invent interdimensional travel. They are married, a fact that Salma has said made them "practically amoebas". Refaat came to know the couple through letters they sent to him chronicling their adventures through the multiverse. The stories featuring them star them too, with Refaat taking a backseat and assuming a narrator's role. They were introduced in the eighth installment.
- Dr. Ramzy Habib: An Egyptology professor who is a prominent expert on Ancient Egypt. He is a recurring character throughout the series. He was introduced in the ninth installment.
- Dr. Samy: Refaat's psychologist friend whose house and parties he hosted were the setting for many of the series' installments. He is described as an affluent, sophisticated, intelligent, and a social person, which often clashes with Refaat's introverted nature. He was introduced in the tenth installment.
- Hun Cho Kan: Hun Cho Kan is a 16th century Tibetan monk from a fictional group of warrior monks known as the Nava-Rae. They are implied to possess superhuman strength, speed, and precession, due to a combination of their rigorous training and their religious practices, which give them access to some form of magical power. They have a sacred religious text known as the Shokara which contains instructions on how to perform magical rituals, one of which can transport the practitioner through space and time. When he's first introduced, Hun Cho Kan is forced to use said ritual to escape after being betrayed by a member of the Nava-Rae temple, resulting in the whole clan being killed, with him as the sole survivor. Serendipitously, the ritual transports him to modern day Egypt where he meets Refaat. Hun Cho Kun is intelligent, managing to learn a number of foreign languages in a very short span of time, becoming fluent in almost all of them. He is very strong, agile, and a skilled fighter. He was introduced in the eleventh installment.
- Dr. Camilia: A philosophy professor Refaat met during one of his usual supernatural misadventures, the events of which caused a misunderstanding between the two, but they end up warming up to each other and becoming friends later on. She is described as an intelligent, slightly disagreeable, and self-managed feminist. She was introduced in the 21st installment.
- Sam Colby: An acquaintance of Refaat. He is a Jewish-American con-artist and fraudster. He pretends to possess legitimate knowledge of magic and esoteric arts but is actually an impostor who has little to no knowledge of the paranormal. He was introduced in the 19th installment.
- Dr. Frantz Lucifer: Refaat's main rival and one of the series' principal antagonists. He has a distinctive look, and is described as a tall, "darkly man", with prominent eyebrows, neat black clothing, and heavy jewelry made of gold that he is quite fond of wearing. When he is first introduced, he poses as a Hungarian expert on the supernatural. Later on, he is slowly revealed to be more than that. He has successfully deceived Refaat on several occasions and has had the chance to destroy or kill him; however, he ultimately decides against it, and even ends up saving and helping Refaat on occasion, as he found it more entertaining to let him live. He viewed his relationship with Refaat as a perpetual game of cat and mouse that he was reluctant to put an end to. He is revered, respected, and even feared among demons, monsters, and otherworldly creatures. Dr. Lucifer possesses telepathic abilities as well as other supernatural abilities that are not fully explored. He was heavily implied to be the devil himself throughout the series, but the penultimate story reveals that he is actually the eldest son of Satan. Lucifer was introduced in the 20th installment.

== Adaptations ==
In May 2020, Netflix released Season 1 of an original Middle Eastern TV series based on Ma Waraa' Al Tabi'aa. The series was produced by Mohamed Hefzy and Amr Salama, who is also the showrunner and the director for some episodes. He is a fan of the series and Towfik in general, and the adaptation was a passion project for him. The series was successful and reached the Netflix Top 10 Charts in Egypt, although it has faced some criticism for straying too far from the source material.

== Bibliography ==
The main series consists of 81 published books or novellas. The last installment in the series was considered to be one book by the author, though it was published in two volumes. Below is a list of the books, with the titles translated into English:

#	Title
1	The Vampire and The Myth of the Werewolf
2	The Myth of the Caller
3	The Myth of the Lake Monster
4	The Myth of the Cannibal
5	The Myth of the Living Dead
6	The Myth of Medusa's Head
7	The Myth of the Cave Guard
8	The Myth of Another Earth
9	The Myth of the Pharaoh's Curse
10	The Circle of Horror
11	The Myth of the Last Monk (Part 1)
12	The Myth of the House
13	The Myth of the Blue Flames
14	The Myth of the Yeti (Alternatively: The Myth of the Abominable Snowman or the Myth of the Snowman)
15	The Myth of the Plant
16	The Myth of the Nava-Rae (Part 2)
17	The Myth of the Graveyard Lady (Alternatively: The Myth of Graveyard Belle or The Myth of the Graveyard Beauty)
18	The Myth of the Strangers
19	The Myth of Poe
20	The Tarot Tales
21	The Myth of the Sun's Enemy (Alternatively: The Myth of the Albino Man)
22	The Myth of the Minotaur
23	The Myth of the Swamp's Horror (Alternatively: The Myth of the Horror in the Swamps)
24	The Myth of Igor (Part 1)
25	The Myth of the Returning General (Part 2)
26	The Myth of the Showdown (Part 3) (Alternatively: The Myth of the Final Battle or The Myth of the Confrontation)
27	The Myth of Us (Alternatively: Our Myth)
28	The Myth of the Late Night (Part 1)
29	The Myth of the Incubus (Part 2)
30	After Midnight
31	The Myth of Her (Alternatively: Her Myth)
32	The Myth of Refaat
33	The Myth of the Land of the Mongols (Alternatively: The Myth of the Mongol Earth)
34	The Myth of the Pale Ones
35	The Myth of Dracula's Blood
36	The Myth of Platoon 6 (Alternatively: The Myth of the Sixth Platoon or The Myth of the Sixth Unit)
37	The Myth of the Doll
38	The Myth of the Other Half (Part 1)
39	The Myth of the Twins (Part 2)
40	Behind The Closed Door
41	The Myth of Frankenstein
42	The Myth of the Seven Words
43	A Different Myth
44	The Myth of the Man from Beijing (Alternatively: The Myth of the Beijing Man)
45	The Myth of the House of Vipers
46	The Myth of Another Child
47	The Myth of House Number 5
48	The Myth of the Mummy
49	The Myth of the Clan
50	In the Side of the Stars
51	The Myth of the Ominous Number
52	A Boring Myth
53	The Myth of the Prophecy (Part 1)
54	The Myth of the Diviner (Part 2) (Alternatively: The Myth of the Fortune-Teller or The Myth of the Threader)
55	The Myth of φ99###
56	The Myth of the King of the Flies
57	The Myth of the Tomb (Part 1)
58	The Myth of the Land of Lizards
59	The Myth of Black Ronnel (Part 2)
60	The Black Museum
61	The Myth of the Thing
62	The Myth of Pandora's Box
63	The Myth of the Telekinetics (Part 1) (Alternatively: The Myth of the Movers)
64	The Myth of Them (Part 2) (Alternatively: Their Myth)
65	The Myth of the Bloody Markings
66	The Myth of the Men Who Are No Longer So
67	The Myth of the Haunted House (Alternatively: The Myth of the House of Ghosts)
68	The Myth of the Land of Darkness (Alternatively: The Myth of the Dark Land)
69	The Myth of the Ghoul Club
70	The Lost Episodes
71	The Myth of Shadows
72	The Myth of the Totem
73	A Semi-Frightening Myth
74	The Myth of the Song of Death (Alternatively: The Myth of the Deadly Song)
75	The Myth of the Parasite
76	The Myth of the Gallery of Fear
77	The Myth of the Blue Girl
78	The Myth of the Light-Bearer Part 1
79	The Myth of the Lighr-Bearer Part 2
80 (1)	The Myth of All Myths (Volume 1)
80 (2)	The Myth of All Myths (Volume 2)

== Circles of Horror ==
Every 10th installment in the series is a special installment known as a Circle of Horror. These are usually anthologies featuring multiple characters who each tell a supernatural story that happened to them, the stories often being connected by a theme or a common motif. There are some exceptions to that structure; namely, the 20th installment, which features stories about multiple characters, but they are told by a tarot reader rather than the character themselves, the 60th installment, which does feature multiple stories with multiple POV characters, but the stories are told by the curator of a mysterious museum, and the 80th installment, which is composed of fragments and memories of Refaat that he recounts while on his deathbed.

Below is a list of these special installments and a brief summary for each of them:

- 10. The Circle of Horror: Refaat is invited to a party at an affluent and sophisticated colleague's house. A storm arises and prevents the guests from returning home, so they decide to pass the time by telling real horror stories that happened to them or to someone they know.
- 20. The Tarot Tales: Invited to a New York-based Occultist Society party by his acquaintance Sam Colby, a self-proclaimed expert on the paranormal, Refaat participates in a tarot session where a mysterious man named Frantz Lucifer who claims to be a Hungarian expert on supernatural matters and a professional tarot reader does a reading for those in attendance.
- 30. After Midnight: Episodes from a short-lived paranormal-oriented late-night radio program that Refaat was a recurring guest of. The program is hosted by a talented and energetic radio host called Sherif El-Saadany and accepts live phone calls from listeners who often use their calls to tell supernatural tales they've experienced, often seeking Dr. Refaat's advice on the matter.
- 40. Behind the Closed Door: Refaat is invited to a New Year's Eve party at an affluent colleague's house, though his colleague seems to be running late. It later transpires that his colleague was never coming, since by the time the guests arrive, he had already departed to the United States to seek treatment for a terminal illness. Through a tape recording he made, he reveals that he has rigged all exits but one so that opening any except for the correct door would spell death for the guests. He did this to express disdain for his guests, whom he accuses of shortcomings such as lack of integrity, with the only exception of Refaat, whom he invited because he thought he'd enjoy the experience. Knowing that help would come by morning in the form of a routine police visit, the guests decide to pass the time and spend the night telling their stories dealing with the subject of closed doors and what lies beyond them.
- 50. In the Side of the Stars: While travelling alone by car on a cold night far away from home, Refaat seeks refuge in an abandoned house. He later wakes up to find himself in an alternate dimension where other confused individuals await before a number of demons, having arrived there through a trans-dimensional portal. The demons proclaim that those before them are each evil in some way, and announce that all will be banished to hell, with the exception of he who could prove to be the evilest among them, as the demons decide they are to be spared.
- 60. The Black Museum: An eccentric collector invites Refaat to view his collection of artifacts, each related to a paranormal incident.
- 70. The Lost Episodes: Similar to #30.
- 80. The Myth of All Myths: Refaat is on his deathbed recalling and telling stories and fragments of memories that he has never told before or has only told in part. It is the final installment in the series and was published in two volumes.

== See also ==
- List of titles of Ma Waraa Al Tabiaa series
- Rewayat
