= Ahmed Khaled Tawfik =

Egyptian writer (1962–2018)

Ahmed Khaled Tawfik أحمد خالد توفيق
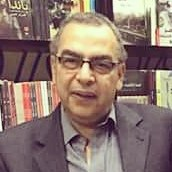
- Born: Ahmed Khaled Tawfik Farraag; 10 June 1962; Tanta, Egypt
- Died: 2 April 2018 (aged 55); Cairo, Egypt
- Occupations: Novelist, author, poet, former professor of medicine at Tanta University
- Writing career
- Genres: Horror, drama and comedy
- Notable awards: Utopia shortlisted for 2012 Science Fiction & Fantasy Translation Awards

Ahmed Khaled Tawfik Farrag (Arabic: أحمد خالد توفيق فراج; 10 June 1962 – 2 April 2018), also known as Ahmed Khaled Tawfek, was an Egyptian author and physician who wrote more than 200 books, in both Egyptian Arabic and Classical Arabic. He was the first contemporary writer of horror, and science fiction in the Arabic-speaking world, and the first writer to explore the medical thriller genre.

Tawfik is considered by many to have been one of the most influential writers of his time. His legacy has influenced thousands of Arabic-language authors.

== Biography ==
Born on 10 June 1962 in the northern Egyptian city of Tanta, Tawfik graduated from Tanta University's medical school in 1985. In 1992, he joined the Modern Arab Association publishing company and began writing his first series of novels the following year. In January 1993, he published the first installment in his horror/thriller series Ma Waraa Al Tabiaa (Arabic: ما وراء الطبيعة), which translates to Beyond nature or "Metaphysics". He also wrote periodical articles for journals and web-based magazines such as El Destoor and Rewayty. His writing style appealed to both Egyptian and broader Arabic-speaking audiences, gaining him popularity in Egypt, and the rest of the Middle East.

Tawfik's novels typically feature all Egyptian characters, and are set both in Egypt, and around the world. Some of his characters are semi-autobiographical. Tawfik draws from personal experiences in their creation; fans consider him their "godfather" and identify him most closely with his character Refaat Ismael, who is featured in the Ma Waraa Al Tabiaa series. His book Utopia may even reflect Egypt as it is becoming, with rich and poor and no middle-class.

== Characters ==
=== Refaat Ismael ===
Refaat Ismael is the main character of Ma Waraa Al Tabiaa. He is a retired doctor who leads a life chock-full of paranormal experiences. A bachelor with a sarcastic attitude, this character is widely loved by fans of Egyptian pocket novels.

=== Alaa abdel Azeem ===
Alaa abdel Azeem is the main character of the Safari. He's a young Egyptian physician who works for a fictitious medical establishment named Safari, with branches in African countries. Safari's sole purpose is to hunt diseases. The character is married to Bernadette Jones, a Canadian pediatrician. This character is witty, nervous, not the greatest physician but a quick study who enjoys performing surgeries.

=== Abeer abdel Rahman ===
Abeer abdel Rahman is the main character of the Fantazia series. She's a simple Egyptian housewife with average looks, but well read. She marries a handsome computer programmer, Sherif, who has invented DG-2 (Dream Generator 2), a high tech device that can materialize preexisting human knowledge into dreams. With the device, Abeer has the chance to participate in any story she knows and live with any character (Superman, Batman, Adham Sabri).

== Works ==
Tawfik began writing his stories when he was only ten years old, and he wrote, in all, more than 500 books. His series Fantasia was the first of its kind; a plot that presents famous literary works to young people, through an interactive presentation. Fantasia presented his readers to a wide spectrum of topics from Arthur Conan Doyle and Sikhism, to Fyodor Dostoevsky and the Mafia's Cosa Nostra.

Other works include:

- An Arabic translation of Chuck Palahniuk's novel Fight Club.
- Utopia is about Egyptian people living in a dystopian and utopian society, separated by walls. It's a fictional, political-minded novel, published by Merit, translated into English by Chip Rossetti. There were plans to make it a major motion picture, with a scheduled release date of 2017; however, the project did not come to fruition. Utopia translated into Italian in 2019 by Barbara Benini and into German by Christine Battermann in 2017.
- El-Singa (Egyptian slang for The Knife) is an Egyptian politically-flavored novel published by Bloomsbury Qatar Foundation Publishing.
- Just Like Icarus is a fictional political-minded novel, published by Dar El Shorouq.
- Ahmad Khaled also wrote periodical articles for "El Dostoor" newspaper in Egypt.
- Rewayat (Egyptian pocket novels)
- Shabeeb Novel
- "Your luck today" novel, published in 2010.
- "Tea with mint" collection of articles published in 2012.
- "You are not alone"
- "Sombre laughs".
- " A story you will end."
- " Now we open the box" part 1.
- " Now we open the box" part 2.

== Death ==
Ahmed Khaled Tawfik died on 2 April 2018 at El Demerdash Hospital in Cairo, Egypt. He had undergone, on the same day, a cardiac ablation surgery to correct his long-term arrhythmia. The immediate cause of death was reported to be cardiac arrest due to ventricular fibrillation that he suffered a few hours after waking up from the surgery.

== Recognition ==
- In April 2018, the Egyptian rock band Cairokee released a song titled He's No Longer A Child (Arabic: ما عاد صغيرا) based on lyrics from Dr. Tawfik's 1987 poem Coronary Arteries (Arabic: شرايين تاجية).
- On 10 June 2019, on what would have been Tawfik's 57th birthday, he was honored with a Google Doodle.
- On 5 November 2020, Netflix released Paranormal, a six-part adaptation of Ma Waraa Al Tabiaa, which marked the streaming service's first original Egyptian series.
- On 31 October 2022, Shahid released the first episode of the first season of Room 207, a ten episode season adaptation of the book with the same title.
