= Modern Arab Association =

- Founded: 1960; 66 years ago
- Founder: Hamdi Mustafa
- Country of origin: Egypt
- Headquarters location: Faggala, Cairo, Egypt
- Publication types: Books and magazines
- Imprints: Rewayat

The Modern Arab Association (Arabic: المؤسسة العربية الحديثة, Al-Muʾassasa al-ʿArabiyya al-Ḥadītha; The Modern Arabic Institute) is an Egyptian publishing house.

Established by Hamdi Mustafa in 1960, it published reference and revision school books for Egyptian school children, including the Silāḥ al-Tilmīdh (The Student's Weapon) series.

In 1984 it started publishing several book series in the Arabic language under the name Rewayat (Egyptian Pocket Novels). That series was particularly popular "during the 1980s and 1990s". The Modern Arab Association has been the official publisher and distributor of Rewayat to all over the Arabic-speaking world.

The first authors writing for the Modern Arab Association in this period were Nabil Farouk and Sharif Shawqi.

== Book series ==
More than 40 series have been published including:

- Silāḥ al-Tilmīdh (The Student's Weapon)
- Ragol Al Mostaheel (The Man of the Impossible).
- Malaf Al Mostakbal (The Future File).
- Al Maktab Raqam 19 (Office No. 19).
- Kūktīl 2000: Mā Warāʾal-Ṭabīʿa (Cocktail 2000)
