= The Watermill Center =

Center for arts and the humanities

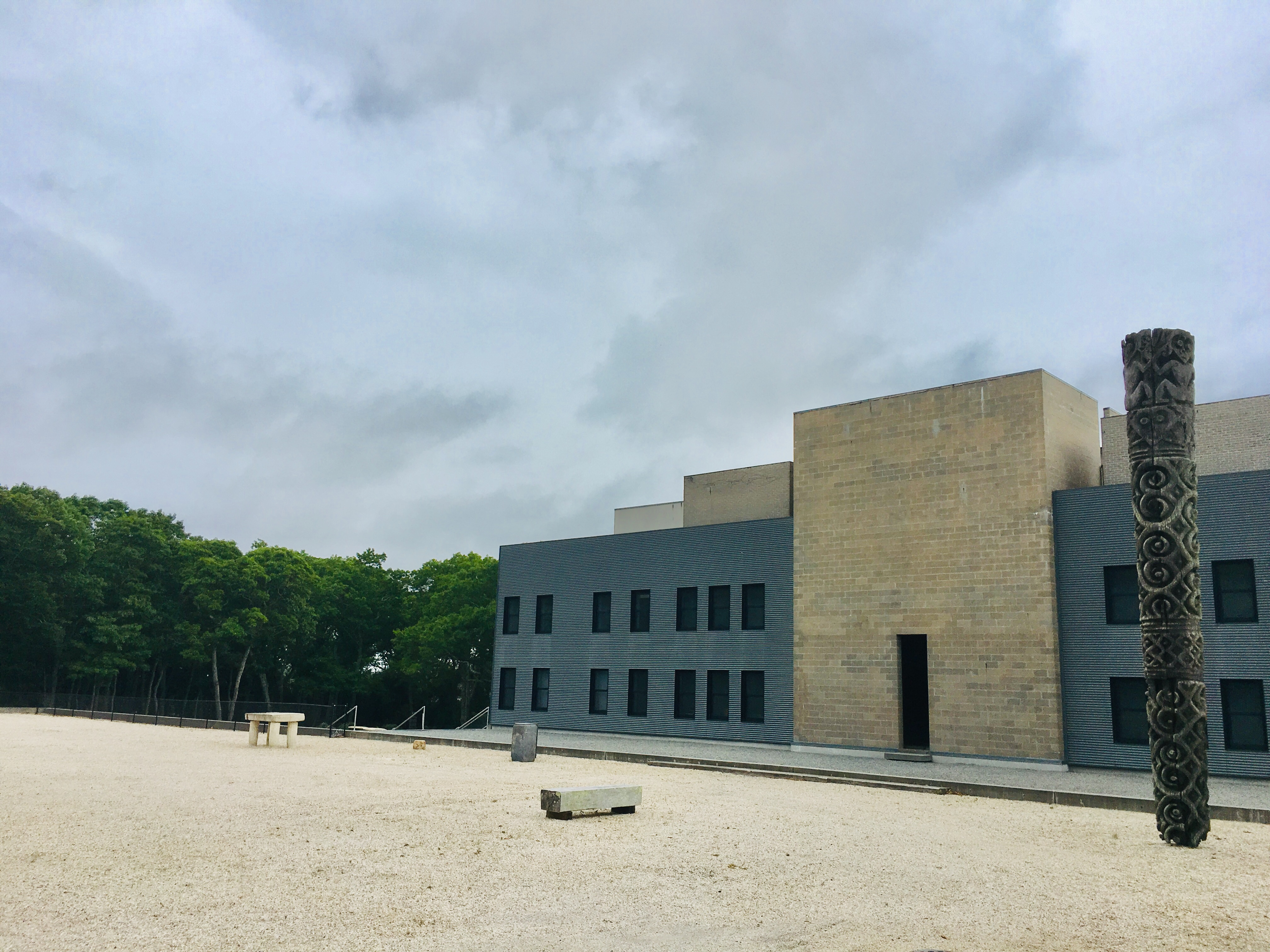

- Location of the Watermill Center
- Established: 1992
- Location: 39 Watermill Towd Road, Water Mill, New York
- Coordinates: 40°55′03″N 72°21′59″W
- Founder: Robert Wilson
- Public transit access: Southampton station
- Website: watermillcenter.org

The Watermill Center is a center for the arts and humanities in Water Mill, New York, founded in 1992 by artist and theater director Robert Wilson.

== Overview ==
The Watermill Center is "a laboratory for performance" founded by Robert Wilson in 1992 on the site of a former Western Union research facility. The Watermill Center is located in Water Mill, New York, and was officially opened to the public in 2006. Its programming currently consists of year-round artist residencies and exhibitions, a public summer lecture series, and a collaborative summer program for young and emerging artists from a variety of disciplines. As a unique center for all the arts working in collaboration, The Watermill Center has been called "the academy of the 21st-Century" by anthropologist Edmund Carpenter, and described by the New York Times as a contemporary " Bayreuth minus the nationalism and the exclusive dedication to the founder's work," In the manner of The Pina Bausch Foundation in Wuppertal, Germany, The Watermill Center is both a study center for research on Wilson's theater and a workspace for creative development. Wilson himself has described Watermill as "a think tank, a contemplative arcade where all kinds of different things can happen."

The Watermill Center is home to The Robert Wilson Archive, The Watermill Study Library, and The Watermill Collection, with notable works of art from Indonesia, Papua New Guinea, indigenous peoples of the Arctic, pre-modern China, and Shaker furniture, as well as works of modern and contemporary artists and designers like Paul Thek, Robert Mapplethorpe, Christopher Knowles, Donald Judd, Gio Ponti, Josef Hoffmann, and Wilson. In 2013, The Louvre Museum in Paris staged "Living Rooms," a major exhibition incorporating works from The Watermill Collection throughout the museum's galleries. The Watermill Center has been the site of exhibitions of artists such as Mike Kelley, Jonathan Meese, and Dieter Meier. In 2015, the Inga Maren Otto Fellowship was established to support international artists-in-residence at the Watermill Center. The Watermill Center is operated by the Byrd Hoffman Water Mill Foundation, a not-for-profit, 501(c)3 tax-exempt organization chartered in 1969 in the State of New York.

== History ==
Robert Wilson first created performance works specific to sites on Eastern Long Island in the late 1960s. In 1962, Wilson founded the Byrd Hoffman School of Byrds, a performance company which collaborated on all of his early works, including Deafman Glance, The Life and Times of Sigmund Freud, The King of Spain, The Life and Times of Joseph Stalin, and KA MOUNTAIN and GUARDenia Terrace. Notable collaborators of the Byrd Hoffman School of Byrds included Gordon Matta Clark, Jack Smith, Sheryl Sutton, and Jerome Robbins. During this period, Robbins was creating Watermill, a ballet with music by Teiji Ito, with early rehearsals and workshops taking place outdoors in Water Mill, New York. Wilson was Robbins's assistant at the time. Previously, Wilson had apprenticed under architect Paolo Soleri at the experimental community of Arcosanti in Arizona.

In 1992, Wilson acquired The Watermill Center's current facilities, which had previously housed a telecommunications laboratory for Western Union, and began to stage experimental performances on site. Early collaborators in these works included Trisha Brown and Susan Sontag, and Philip Glass and Lucinda Childs, who had previously collaborated with Wilson on Einstein on the Beach, and others. Author Brad Gooch worked at Watermill on a production of Persephone, staged by Wilson in 1995, and Isabelle Huppert rehearsed her role in Virginia Woolf's Orlando in 1993, returning in 2006 to act in Heiner Müller's Quartet. In 2000 Watermill was the origin point for a production of Lady from the Sea and in 2003–04, Wilson's epic theater work I La Galigo with a cast of 53 Indonesian actors was developed there. Other notable productions initiated by Wilson with students at The Watermill Center include Time Rocker with music by Lou Reed, Jean Genet's Les Negres, Eugene Ionesco's Rhinoceros, Giuseppe Verdi's La Traviata, Claudio Monteverdi's The Coronation of Poppea, HAMLET: a monlogue, Lady from the Sea, and Adam's Passion, with music by Estonian composer Arvo Pärt.

== Design ==
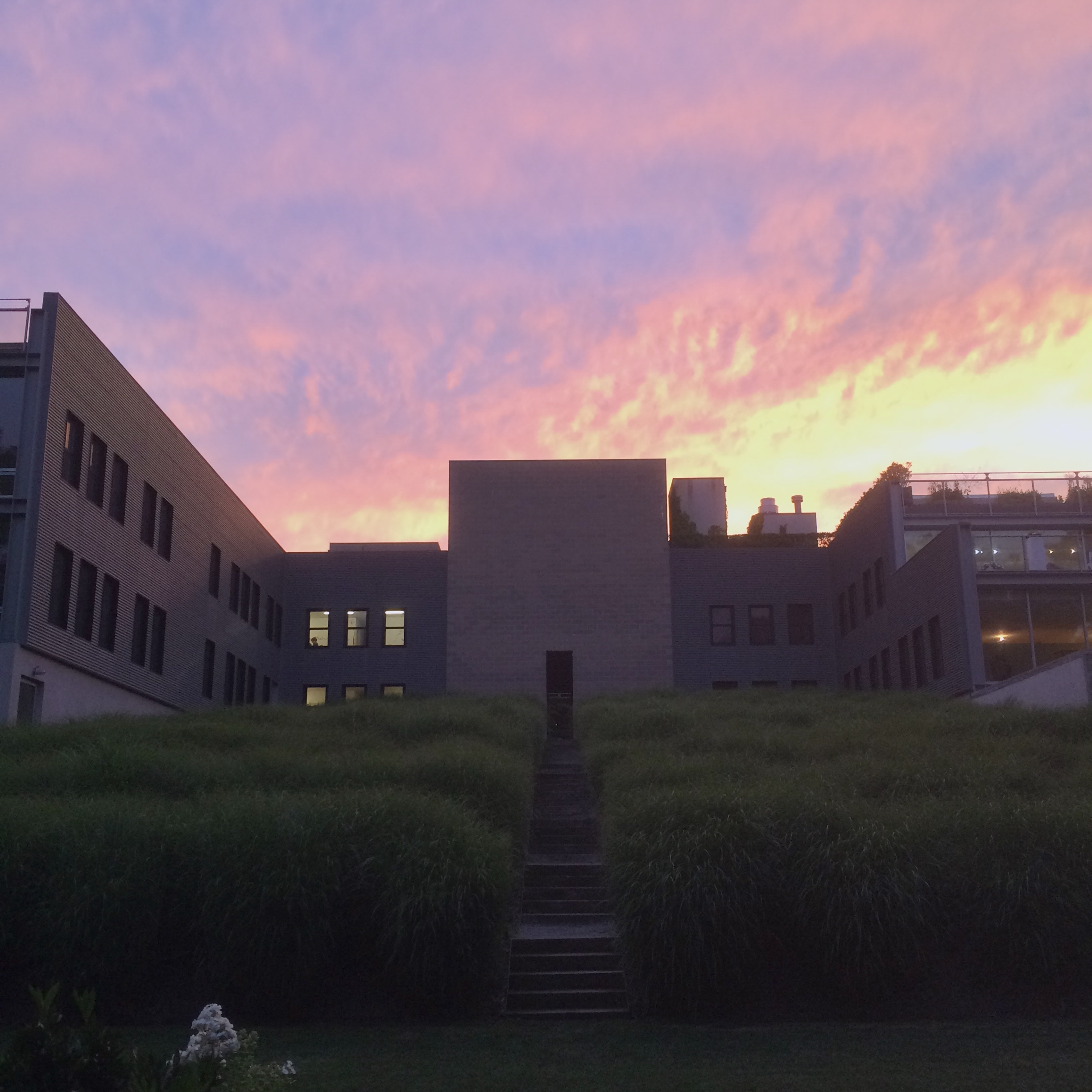
The Watermill Center at sundown

When Wilson acquired The Watermill Center facilities in 1992, he began a total renovation of the original structure of the Western Union laboratory on which it was founded. The Watermill Center has received numerous accolades and recognitions for its designed minimalism and theatricality. Following certain precepts of Bauhaus design (Wilson was a student of Sibyl Moholy-Nagy, architectural scholar and spouse to Bauhaus artist László Moholy-Nagy), Watermill's design influences also include the traditional architecture of Indonesia, as well as certain structural ideas Wilson incorporates in his theater productions.

The Watermill Center is situated on a 10-acre campus consisting of gardens, natural environments, and permanent installations of wooden sculptures and megalithic stones from Indonesia.

== Programs ==
Artist Residency Program

The Watermill Center’s Artist Residency Program began in 2006 when the Center officially opened as a year-round facility.The Watermill Center provides artists with time, space, and freedom to work in a communal environment that encourages experimentation. Artist residents share their creative process with the community through open rehearsals, workshops, and artist talks. The Watermill Center hosts over 200 artists every year as part of its interdisciplinary Artist in Residence program. Combining international outreach with support for local practitioners, previous residencies have featured artists from the Shinnecock Indian Nation, British sound artist Oliver Beer , artist Geoffrey Farmer (Canadian Pavilion commission for the 2017 Venice Biennale), American author Ishmael Reed and German artist Jorinde Voigt. Artist residencies culminate with "In Process" events, which are open to the public.

International Summer Program

With over 100 participating artists annually, the International Summer Program is an alternative approach to arts education, defying method-learning and academicism in favor of collaboration and experimentation.

Inga Maren Otto Fellowship

The Watermill Center's Fellowship program was established with a gift by philanthropist Inga Maren Otto.

2020

- Naufus Ramirez-Figueroa - Guatemala
- Tomashi Jackson - USA
- Pawel Althamer - Poland
- Ville Andersson - Finland

2019

- Marina Rosenfeld - USA
- Lars Daniel Rehn - Sweden
- Shaun Gladwell - Australia/UK
- Dawn Kasper - USA
- Lucien Smith - USA

2018

- Anne Carson - USA
- Tania Bruguera - Cuba
- Masako Miki - Japan
- Barthelemy Toguo - Cameroon

2017

- Carrie Mae Weems - USA
- Royce Weatherly - USA
- Carlos Bunga - Portugal

2016

- G.T. Pellizzi - Mexico / USA
- Basco Vazko - Chile
- Zeinab Shahidi Marnani - Iran

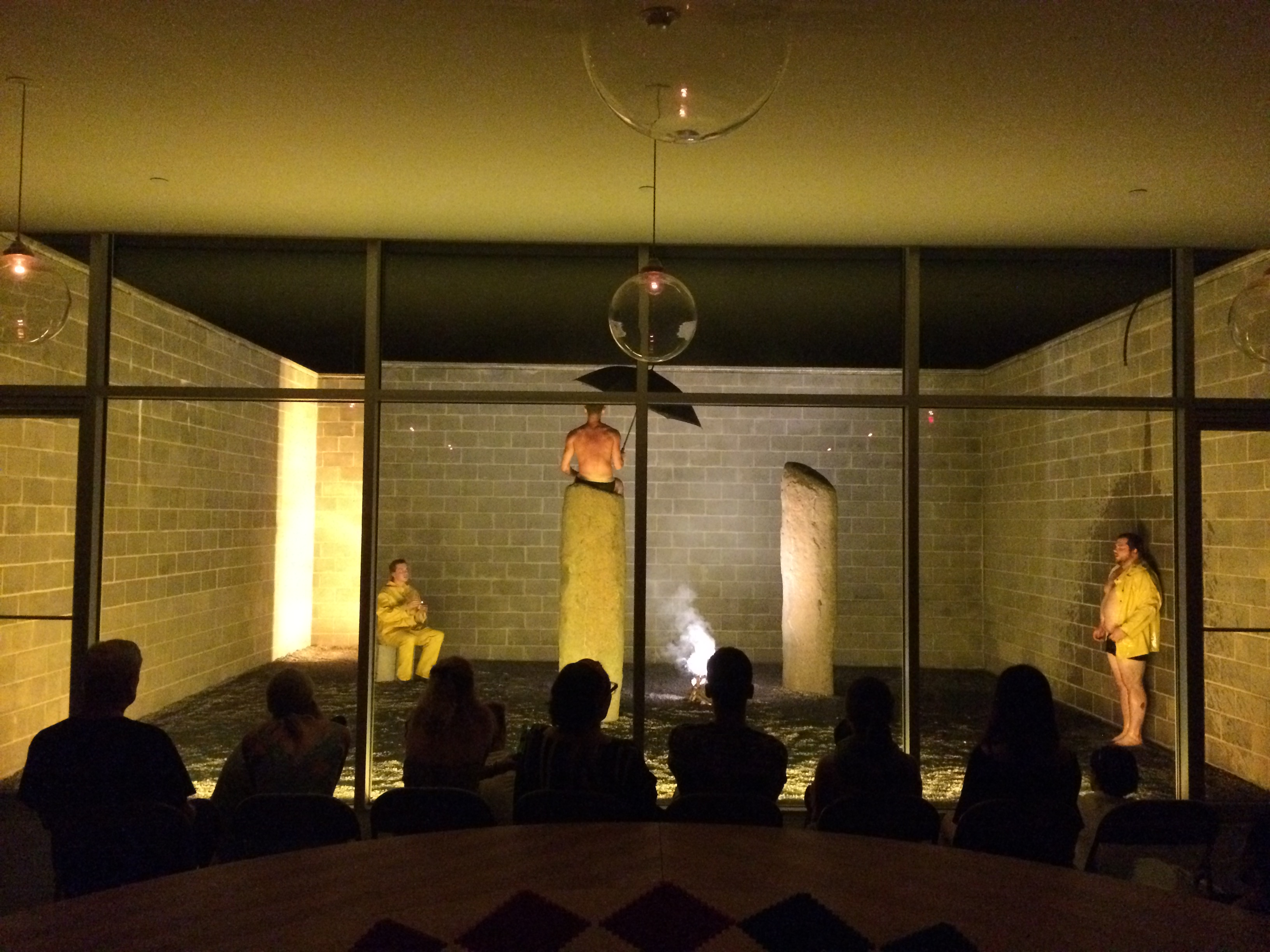
A Performance during The Watermill Center's International Summer Program

Annual Summer Benefit and Auction

Every summer since 1993, the Watermill Center has hosted an outdoor performance festival showcasing the work of hundreds of young artists and drawing an audience of notable guests from New York and elsewhere. Called "without a doubt, the most creative art event for the Hamptons summer colony," by the New York Times, the benefit has featured performances by the likes of Rufus Wainwright, and CocoRosie, with installations of artwork by Dieter Meier, Lady Gaga, Jonathan Meese, Daniel Arsham, Pussy Riot, and others.

Summer Lecture Series

A public forum featuring prominent figures in the arts, design, and science, including: Philip Glass, Pussy Riot, Fern Mallis, Jeffrey A. Hoffman, Marina Abramović, Cornel West, Hilton Als, Daniel Libeskind, and others.

Educational Programs

The Watermill Center hosts a variety of educational programs in service to the public schools in Southampton, East Hampton, Sag Harbor, and The Ross School.

== Performances and exhibitions ==
In 2008 German artist Jonathan Meese was given carte blanche to create "Marlene Dietrich in Dr. No's Ludovico-Clinic (Dr. Baby's Erzland)", an immersive installation within The Watermill Center.

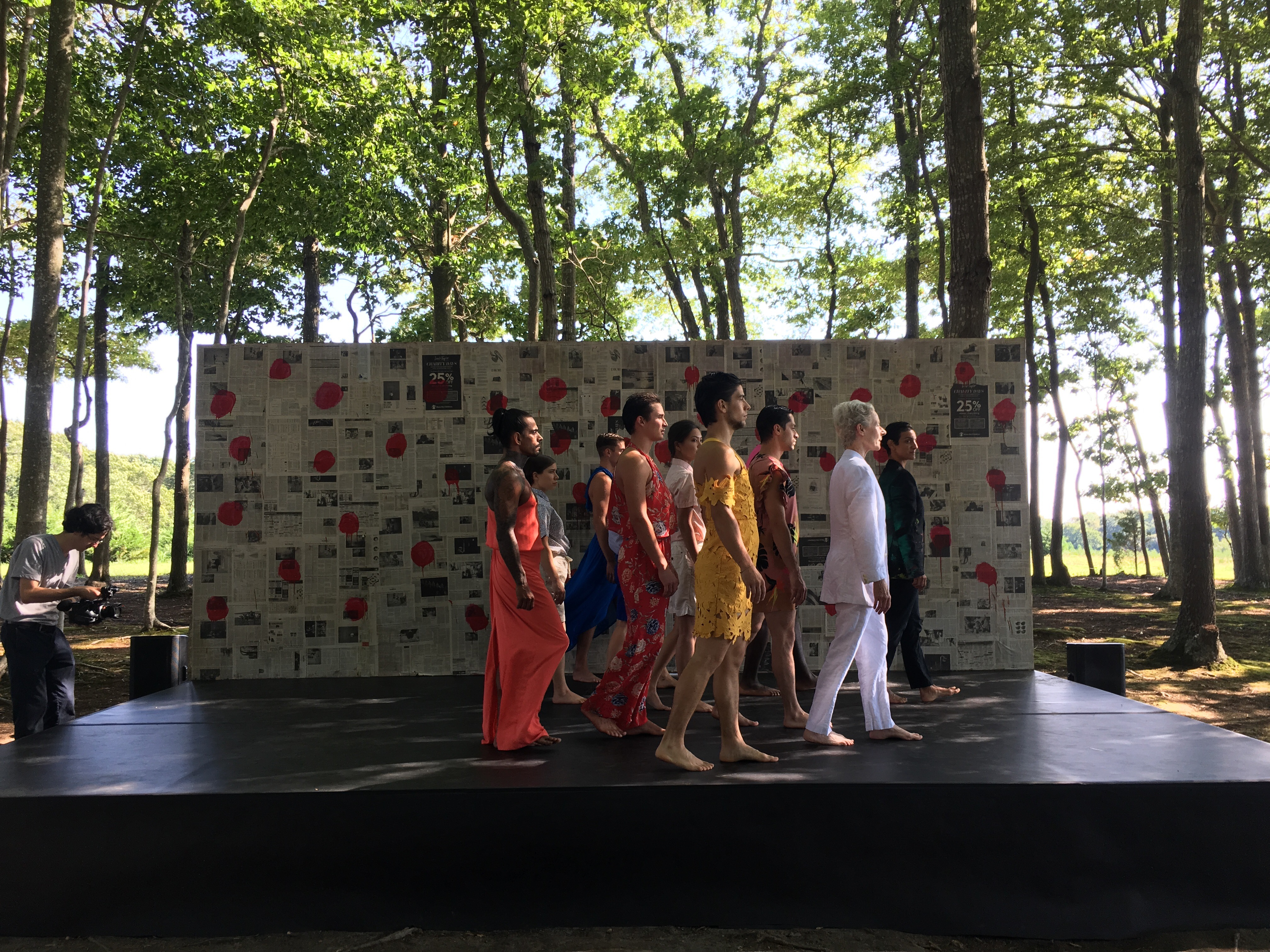
An outdoor performance at The Watermill Center

In 2012, The Watermill Center held the first posthumous exhibition for Detroit-born artist Mike Kelley, curated by Harald Falckenberg. The exhibition featured early experimental soundtracks and videos as well as works from Kelley's "Kandor" series. The Exhibition, "Mike Kelley: 1954-2012," was voted "Best show in a non-profit gallery or alternative space" in 2012 by the International Association of Art Critics.

In 2014 The Watermill Center held the first American exhibition of Robert Wilson's Video Portraits of Lady Gaga. The exhibition had debuted in 2013 at the Louvre Museum in Paris.

Other notable exhibitions and installations include "As We Lay Dying", a large scale theatrical installation by the Bruce High Quality Foundation in 2016,Kembra Pfahler in 2012, Genesis P-Orridge in 2010, Brazilian street artists OSGEMEOS in 2005, Chinese artist Cao Fei in 2004, American sculptor Carol Ross in 2013, Cuban performance artist Tania Bruguera, Russian performance artist Andrey Bartenev.

Artists who have worked and exhibited at Watermill include: Nari Ward, Cory Arcangel, Liz Glynn, Misaki Kawai, Peter Coffin, CocoRosie, Ragnar Kjartansson, Christopher Knowles, Ryan McNamara, John Bock, Sue de Beer, Matt Mullican, Shirin Neshat, William Pope.L, Alvin Baltrop, Tilda Swinton, Jorinde Voigt, Alvin Lucier, Tony Matelli, Lucinda Childs, Jim Jarmusch, Oliver Beer, Stephen Laub, Kirk Knight, Cleon Peterson, Jack Ferver, Tori Wraanes, Noel McKenna, Enric Ruiz Geli, and Wang Qingsong.

One gallery of The Watermill Center is dedicated to a permanent exhibition for the work of American artist Paul Thek.

== General references ==
- Ludwig, Sämi (2017). American Multiculturalism in Context: Views from at Home and Abroad. Cambridge Scholars Publishing. p. 136.
- Indiana, Gary (2013). Carol Ross Sculpture: The Watermill Center. New York: Bata Books.
- Macián, José Enrique, Sue Jane Stocker, and Jörn Weisbrodt, eds. (2011). The Watermill Center – A Laboratory for Performance: Robert Wilson's Legacy. Stuttgart: DACO-VERLAG.
- Otto-Bernstein, Katharina (2006). Absolute Wilson: the biography. New York: Prestel.
- Kalb, Jonathan (2003). Play by Play: Theater Essays and Reviews, 1993-2002. Hal Leonard Corporation. pp. 117–125.
