= Ladderax =

Modular shelving and storage system

Ladderax is a modular shelving and storage system created by Robert Heal in 1964 for Staples of Cricklewood, London. It is an example of Mid-Century modern design.

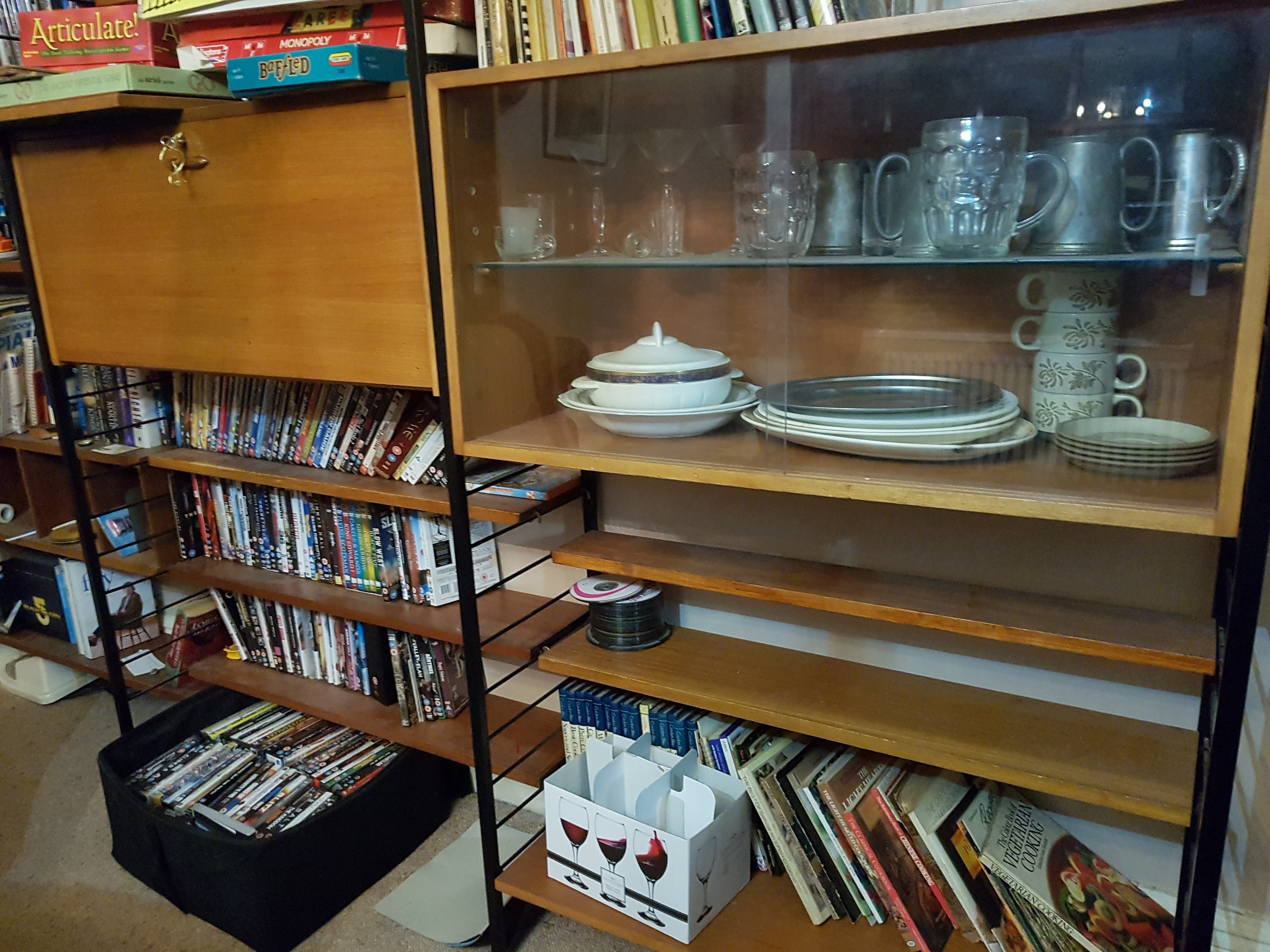
A Ladderax set up

Heal was influenced by the work of the "Danish school". This mid-century Scandinavian design movement was largely about reinterpreting simple, linear shapes from Georgian and Shaker pieces, and making them "straighter".

The Ladderax System comprises a series of upright ladders, supporting shelves, and cabinets. These are fixed by resting on steel support rods, which are hooked onto the rungs of the ladders. They fit into grooves under the shelves and cabinets. This allows easy assembly and flexibility. Ladderax does not require any permanent fixing to a wall, because it self-supports.
