= Kassay =

Kassay is a surname. Notable people with the surname include:

- Jacob Kassay (born 1984), American artist
- John Kassay (1919–2004), American furniture expert, craftsman, draftsman, and photographer
- Rebecca Kassay, American politician
- Tilde Kassay (1887–1964), Italian actress
