= Sheena Wagstaff =

British art historian

- Born: 1956 or 1957 (age 69–70); Colchester, England
- Citizenship: UK
- Education: University of East Anglia; Whitney Independent Study Program
- Occupations: Art historian, curator
- Spouse: Mark Francis

Sheena Wagstaff (born 1956/1957) is a British art historian and curator who oversaw the opening of the Met Breuer in her role as head of the Met's modern and contemporary department. She integrated the museum's contemporary holdings throughout the museum rather than limiting them to dedicated galleries. She is currently creative advisor to Frieze Masters.

Wagstaff was born in England but grew up in Germany, Scotland and the Mediterranean. Prior to her time at the Met, Wagstaff was chief curator at the Tate Modern and oversaw a series of major installations in that museum's Turbine Hall.

== Books ==
- Gerhard Richter: Painting After All ISBN 1588396851
- Unfinished:Thoughts Left Visible
