= Vessel Orchestra =

The Vessel Orchestra is a sound-based art installation created by British artist Oliver Beer. It is the first sound-oriented installation ever commissioned by the Metropolitan Museum of Art. The installation is composed of 32 objects from the museum's collection. Each object has a microphone placed in its hollow space in order to capture the natural sounds that each piece resonates. Beer chose each object for its unique pitch. For instance, a clay vase by Joan Miró resonates the musical note low F. The internal microphones, which do not touch the objects, are connected to a mixer, which is hooked up to a keyboard, therefore allowing a musician to "play" the objects, creating music. The installation was opened to the general public on July 2, 2019, and was on display at the Met Breuer until August 11, 2019. During the exhibit the installation played repeatedly a 20-minute loop of a composition by Beer. In addition, the instrument was played on Friday evenings during live music performances by guest musicians. The installation includes two and a half octaves in a chromatic scale, from low C to high G. It took Beer four years to create the installation. Some of the objects in the installation had never been on display in the museum before. The project was co-curated by Lauren Rosati and Limor Tomer.

== List of works ==
Beer used the following objects in The Met's collection for Vessel Orchestra; works are listed as they appeared in the installation clockwise from the entrance.

Note (SPN)	Work	Date	Artist / Location	Media	Accession number
B_{3}	Shiva vase	1973	Ettore Sottsass	Ceramic	2017.204
C_{4}	Vase	1986	Alessandro Mendini, Sinya Okayama	Stainless steel	1988.241
F_{4}	Trifoglio	1969	Enzo Mari	Ceramic	1988.184.4
G♭_{4}	Blue Mountain Horses	1984	Rudy Autio	Stoneware with colored glazes	1998.534
A♭_{3}	Scofield Thayer	1923, cast 1924	Gaston Lachaise	Bronze, glass	1984.433.30
A_{3}	Squared Up	1985	William Daley	Stoneware	2000.527.1
D♭_{3}	Rhyton in the shape of a bird	ca. early 1st millennium B.C.	Northwestern Iran	Ceramic	59.95
A♭_{2}	Mrs. Olin Levi Warner	1886–87, cast 1897–98	Olin Levi Warner	Bronze	98.9.6
C_{3}	Ewer	19th century	Franchi and Son	Electroformed copper, silver plated and gilt	73.8.52
D_{2}, E♭_{2}, D_{3}	The Ming Sisters	2003	Betty Woodman	Glazed earthenware, epoxy resin, lacquer, paint	2003.413a–c
G♭_{2}	Canaanite jar	ca. 1500–1400 B.C.	Levant	Ceramic	2001.761.9
E_{2}	Storage jar decorated with mountain goats	ca. 3800–3700 B.C.	Central Iran	Ceramic, paint	59.52
D♭_{2}	Pot	1975	Juan Hamilton	Stoneware	1978.496.2
G_{2}	Vessel in form of female(?) figure	ca. 7th–6th century B.C.	Iran, Luristan, Chekka Sabz	Ceramic	43.89.3
C_{2}	Vase	1901	Louis Majorelle	Porcelain	2013.245.5
B♭_{3}	Guild vessel	19th century	Germany	Pewter	1974.28.107
A_{2}	Axe Vessel	1986	Gordon Baldwin	Earthenware	1998.289
B♭_{2}	Fish	ca. 1947	Beatrice Wood	Earthenware, lustered	47.126.2
F_{2}	Vase	1942	Joan Miró, Josep Llorens Artigas	Painted earthenware	1989.402
B_{2}	The Virgin	1906, cast 1909	Andre O'Connor	Bronze	18.38
E♭_{3}	Vase with archaistic patterns	Qing dynasty (1644–1911), Qianlong period (1736–95)	China	Porcelain with green glaze and gilding (Jingdezhen ware)	14.40.400
F_{3}	Temple 7	1977	William Wyman	Earthenware	1980.479
G♭_{3}	Spouted jar	ca. 9th–7th century B.C.	Iran, Tepe Sialk	Ceramic, paint	39.60.9
E_{3}	Ewer	19th century	Franchi and Son	Electroformed copper, silver plated	73.8.8
D♭_{4}	Cooking pot	ca. late 8th–7th century B.C.	Levant, Lachish (modern Tell ed-Duweil, Israel)	Cermanic	34.126.43
D_{4}	Jar with geometric designs	ca. 5300–4300 B.C.	Central Iran	Ceramic, paint	60.61.3
G_{4}	Vase with performance of dragon boat	Qing dynasty (1644–1911), Kangxi period (1662–1722)	China	Porcelain painted with overglaze polychrome enamels (Jingdezhen ware)	14.40.83
E♭_{4}	Vessel #1063	1990	June Schwarcz	Electroplated copper foil, enamel	1995.439
G_{3}	Vase	ca. 1900–1910	Archibald Knox	Pewter	1981.91
E_{4}	Measure	1854–93	Carl Adolph Ferdinand Heidorn	Pewter	1990.199.11
