= Shaker furniture =

Furniture developed by the United Society of Believers in Christ's Second Appearing

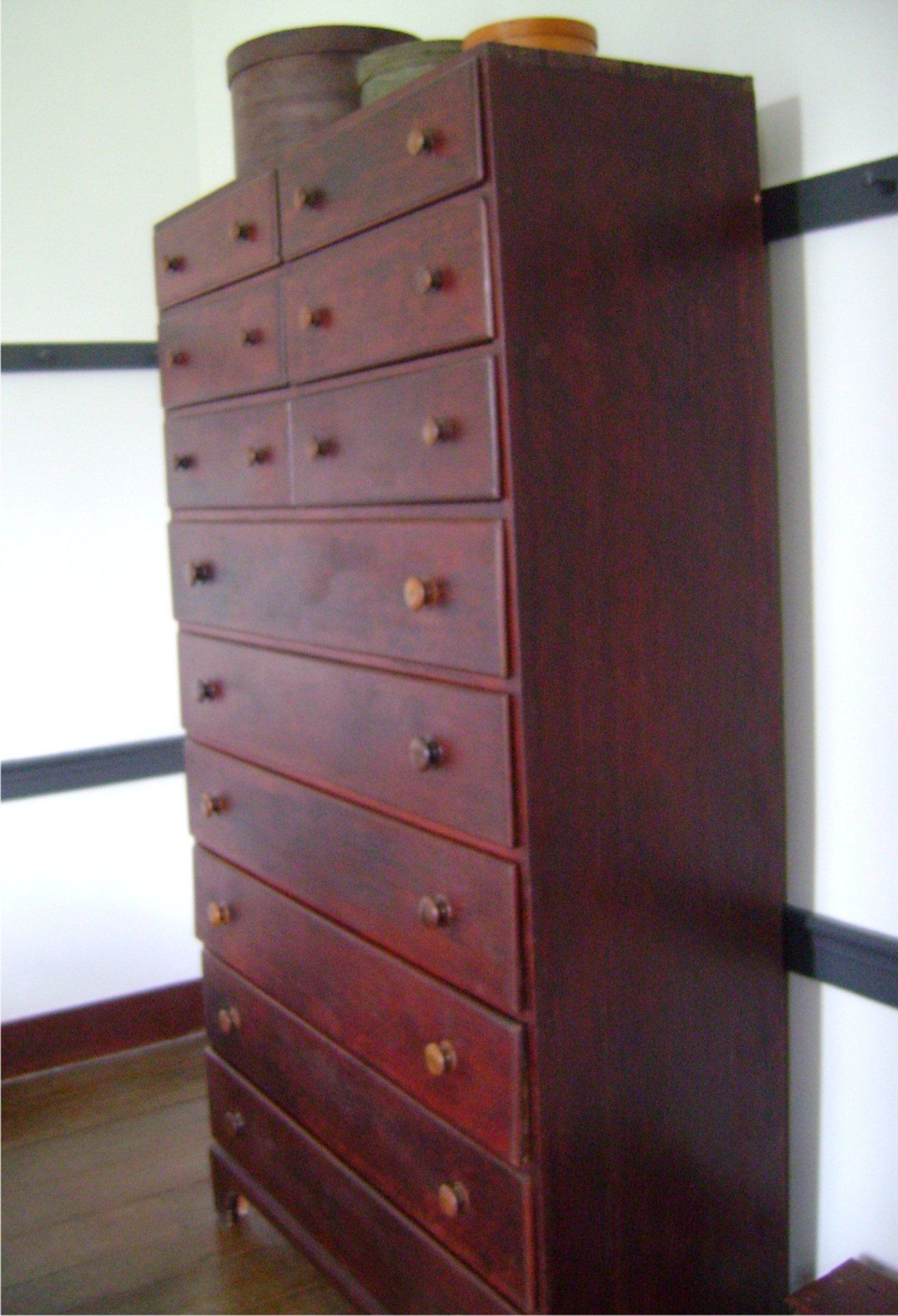
Shaker cabinet

Shaker furniture is a distinctive style of furniture developed by the United Society of Believers in Christ's Second Appearing, commonly known as Shakers, a religious sect that had guiding principles of simplicity, utility and honesty. Their beliefs were reflected in the well-made furniture of minimalist designs.

== History ==
The plain style origins of Shaker furniture connect back to the craft traditions of colonial New York and New England. The furniture brought into early Shaker society were the humble possessions of common people of the day such as farmers, mechanics, and small tradesman. In the 1790s, the total membership of the United Society totaled one thousand. These relatively poor people could not contribute to the common fund, and they preferred to supply their own needs as much as they could. From this a vigorous industrial program was born. As more and more shops were erected, the Shakers were not interested in reproducing existing styles of the day such as canopy beds, high boys, and low boys. They were also discontent with the plainer forms of furniture at that time. From the outset, Shaker cabinet makers wished to free their workmanship from ornamentation. They also wished to free it from deception, which they regarded veneering to be. Instead, they believed in "natural" craftsmanship which left the beauty of the wood unspoiled and unconcealed. This sentiment was consistent with the love of nature that can be found in early Shaker writing. The scaling of industry necessitated the development of labor saving devices and spurred innovation in furniture making methods.

Principles of uniformity were central to Shaker culture. This could be seen in their religious and secular practice: dress, language, manners, forms of worship, and government. This emphasis on unity extended into furniture making through various influences such as the Millennial Laws, which included specific details on the furnishing of rooms and the care of furniture. Yet, these influences did not exact uniformity, and subtle variations that represent community origin can be found.

Shaker communities were largely self-sufficient: in their attempt to separate themselves from the outside world and to create a heaven-on-earth, members grew their own food, constructed their own buildings, and manufactured their own tools and household furnishings.
—Metropolitan Museum of Art

== Overview ==
Furniture was made thoughtfully, with functional form and proportion. Rather than using ornamentation—such as inlays, carvings, metal pulls, or veneers—which was seen as prideful or deceitful, they developed "creative solutions such as asymmetrical drawer arrangements and multipurpose forms to add visual interest." Furniture was made from readily available wood such as cherry, maple or pine lumber, which was generally stained or painted with one of the colors which were dictated by the sect, typically blue, red, yellow or green. Drawer pulls for dressers or other furniture were made of wood. Shakers are known for modifying tools and objects for the needs of aging people, and people with disabilities.

A core business for the New Lebanon Shaker community by the 1860s was the production of well-made "ladder" back or turned post chairs. The minimalist design and woven seats were fast and easy to produce. Furniture built and used by the New Lebanon "believers" is exhibited in the Shaker Retiring Room at the Metropolitan Museum of Art in New York City, which originated from the North Family Shakers' 1818 First Dwelling House. The furniture, acquired in the 1970s, and Shaker textiles are considered among the finest Shaker collections in the world.

Many examples of Shaker furniture survive and are preserved today, including such popular forms as Shaker tables, chairs, rocking chairs (made in several sizes), and cabinets, which are said to have Shaker doors, known for being flat paneled with rail frames. Shaker furniture varies widely in price. Rarer pieces have sold at auction in the mid six figures, while others (e.g. chairs from the 1800s) can be found in the hundreds. Collections of Shaker furniture are maintained by many art and historical museums in the United States and the United Kingdom, as well as in numerous private collections including the Shaker tilting chair. The underlying principles of Shaker design have given inspiration to some of the finest designers of modern furniture. Shaker ladder back chairs, for instance, deeply influenced the work of an entire generation of postwar Danish designers. Also many ideals of furniture formed around the common Shaker furniture construction. Furniture movements such as Bauhaus and mid-century modern have been influenced by Shaker design.

== Notable people ==
- Tabitha Babbitt, Shaker toolmaker and inventor
- Ken Hakuta, Shaker furniture collector
- John Kassay, author and expert on Shaker furniture
- Isaac N. Youngs, Shaker furniture and clock maker
- Charles Sheeler, Modernist Master and Shaker collector
- Jasper Johns, artist and Shaker collector
- Ellsworth Kelly, artist and Shaker collector
- Juliana Force, first director of the Whitney Museum of Art and Shaker collector

== Gallery ==
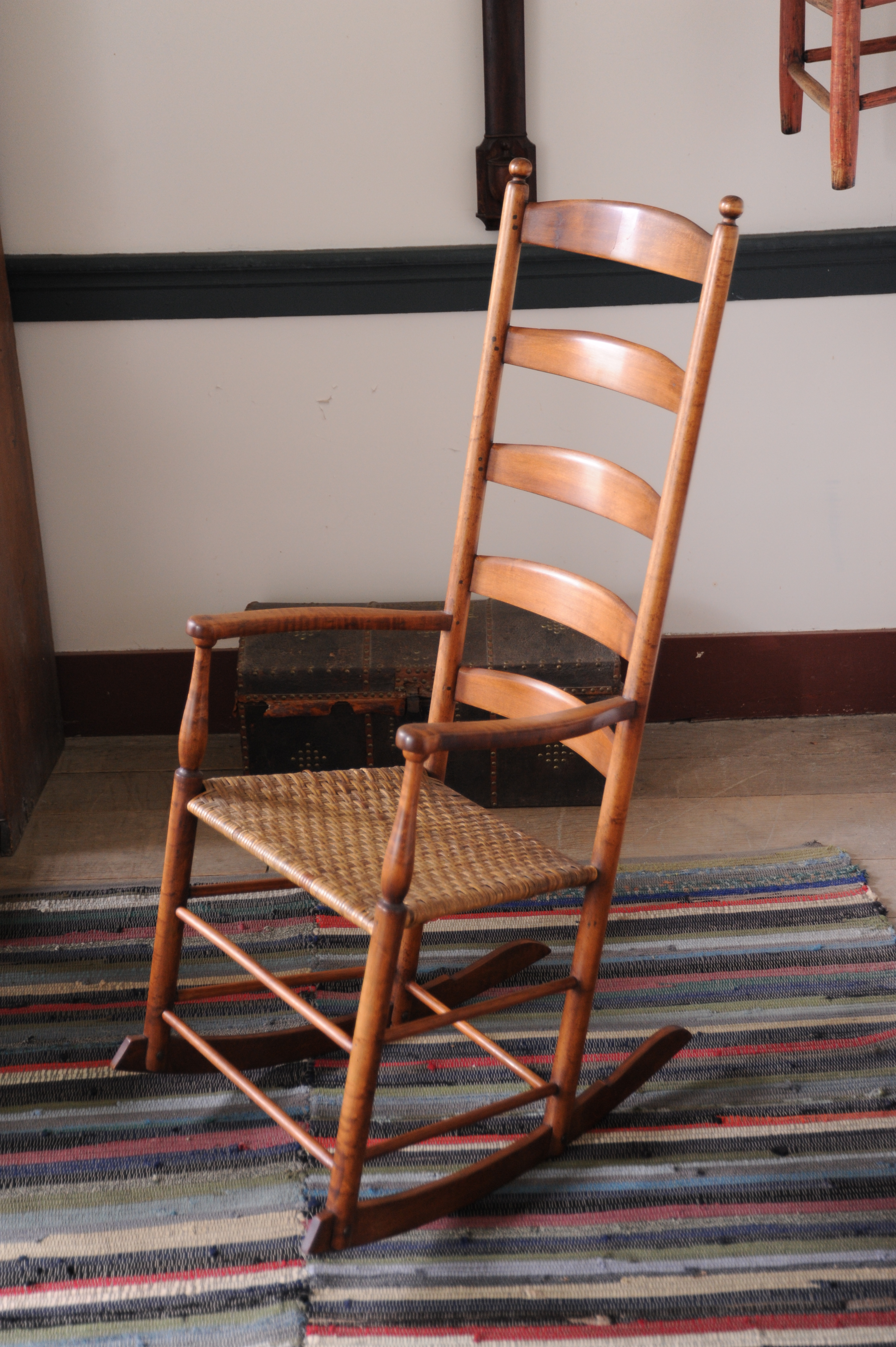
A restored rocker at Shaker Village located near Harrodsburg, KY.

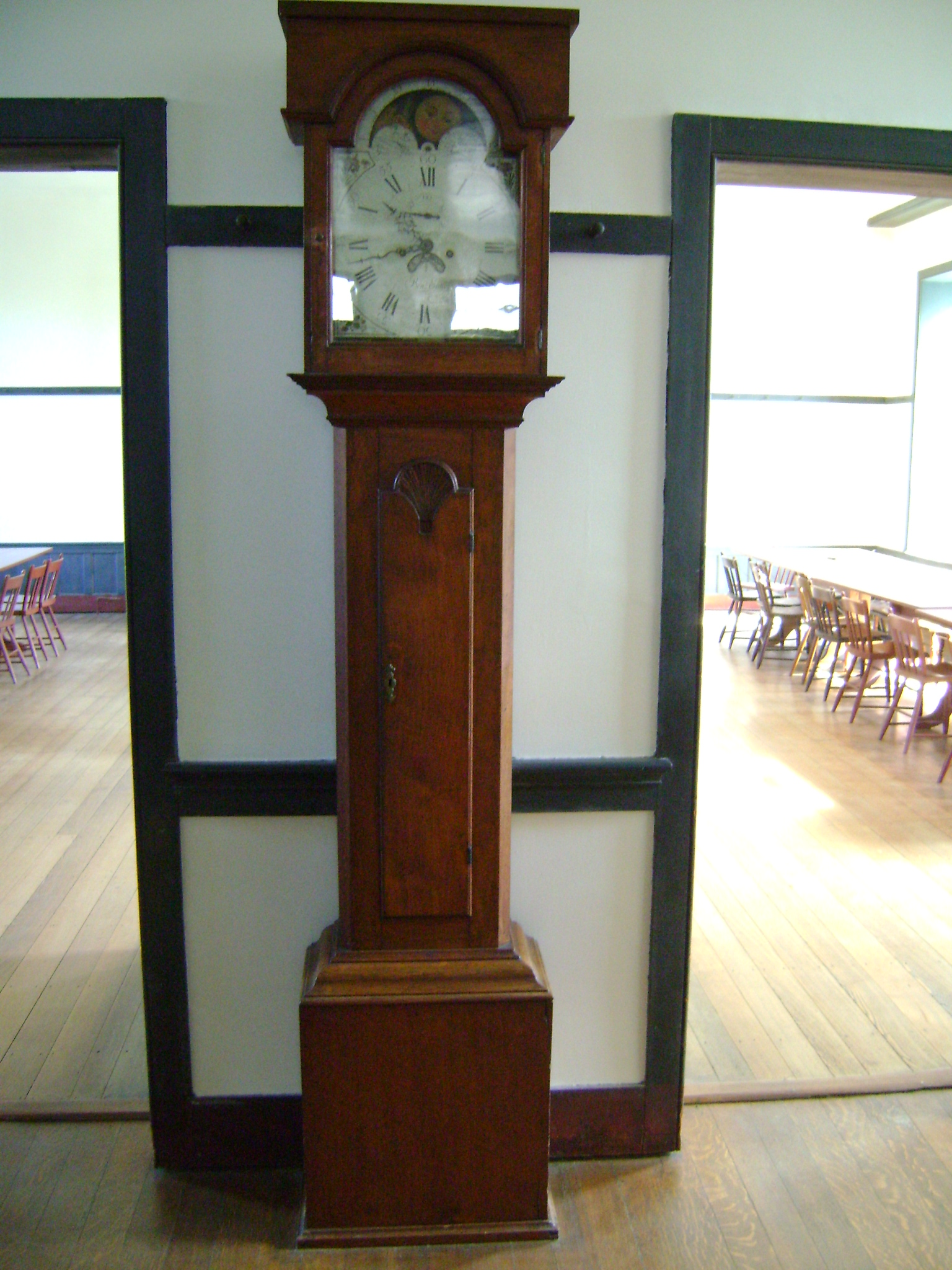
Shaker clock

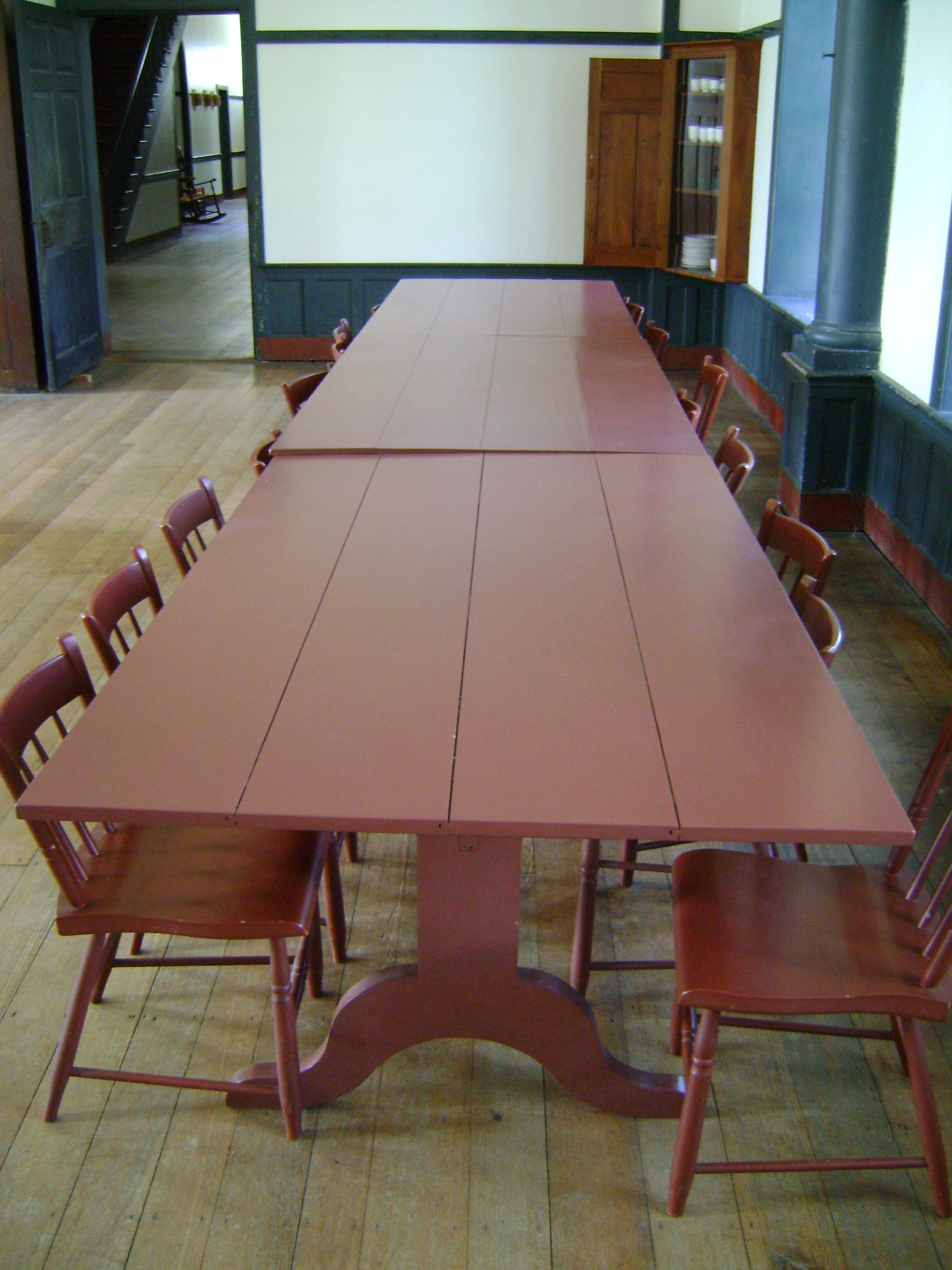
Shaker dining table

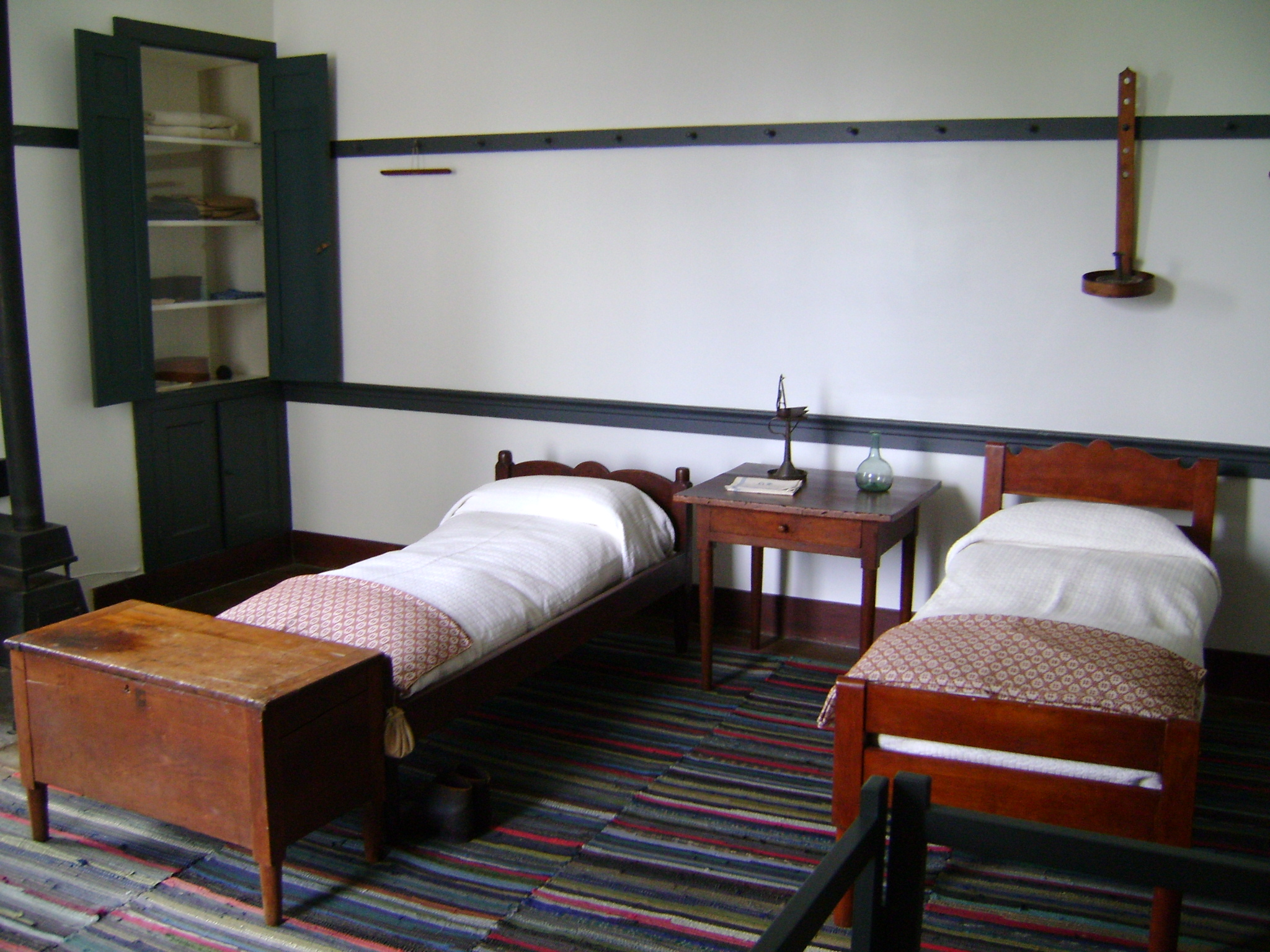
Shaker bedroom

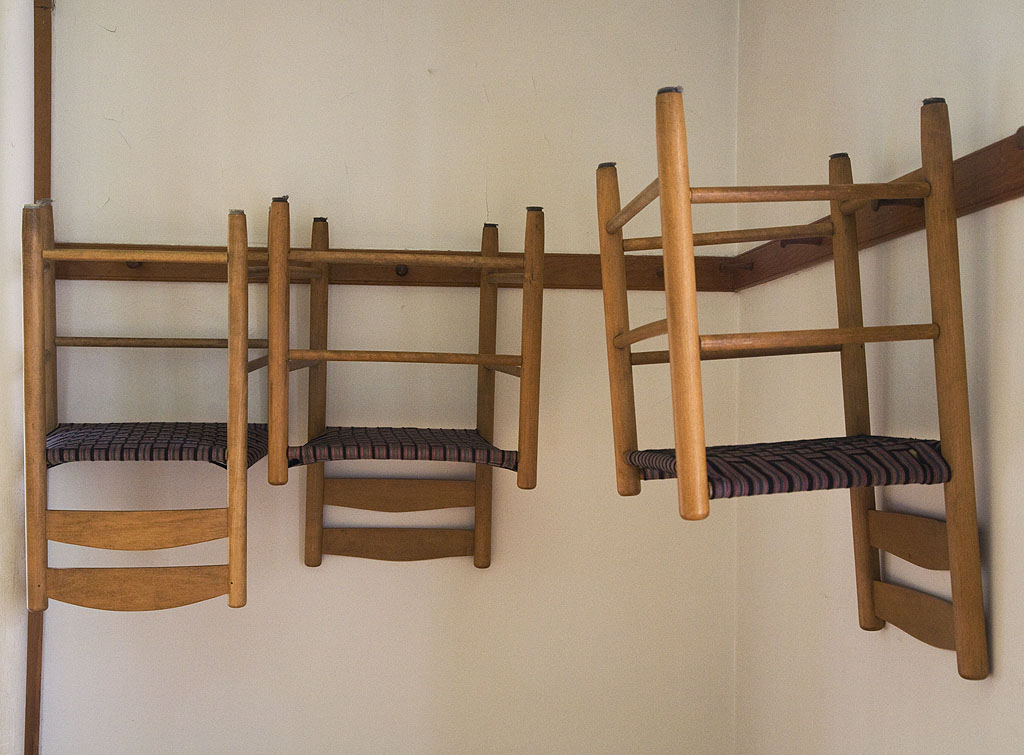
Chairs suspended from Shaker pegs at Hancock Shaker Village, Western Massachusetts, USA

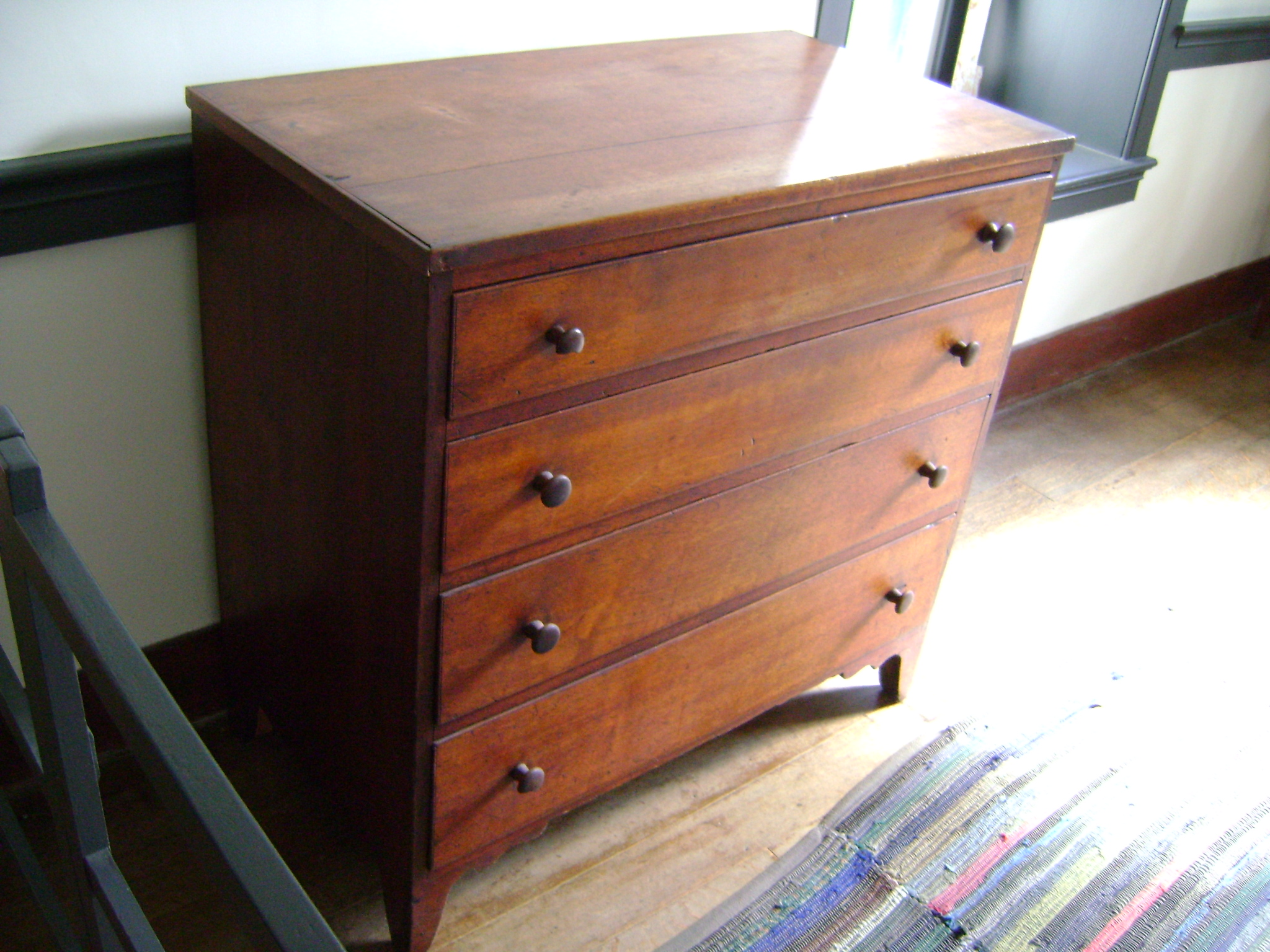
Shaker bureau

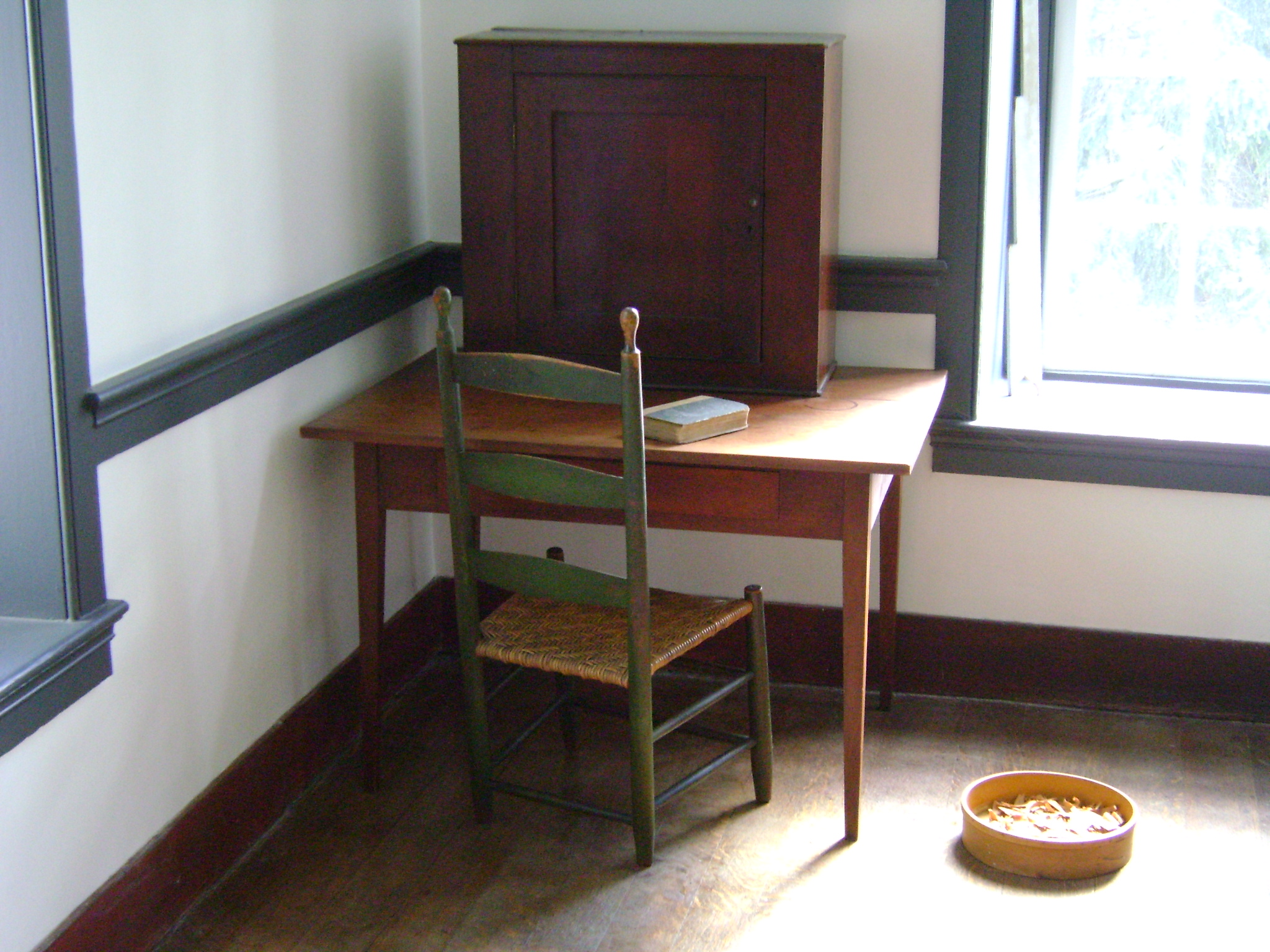
Shaker student desk

== See also ==
- Amish furniture
- Daniel Cragin Mill
- Shaker Shed
