= Met Breuer =

Defunct art museum in New York City

Coordinates: 40.7734°N 73.9638°W

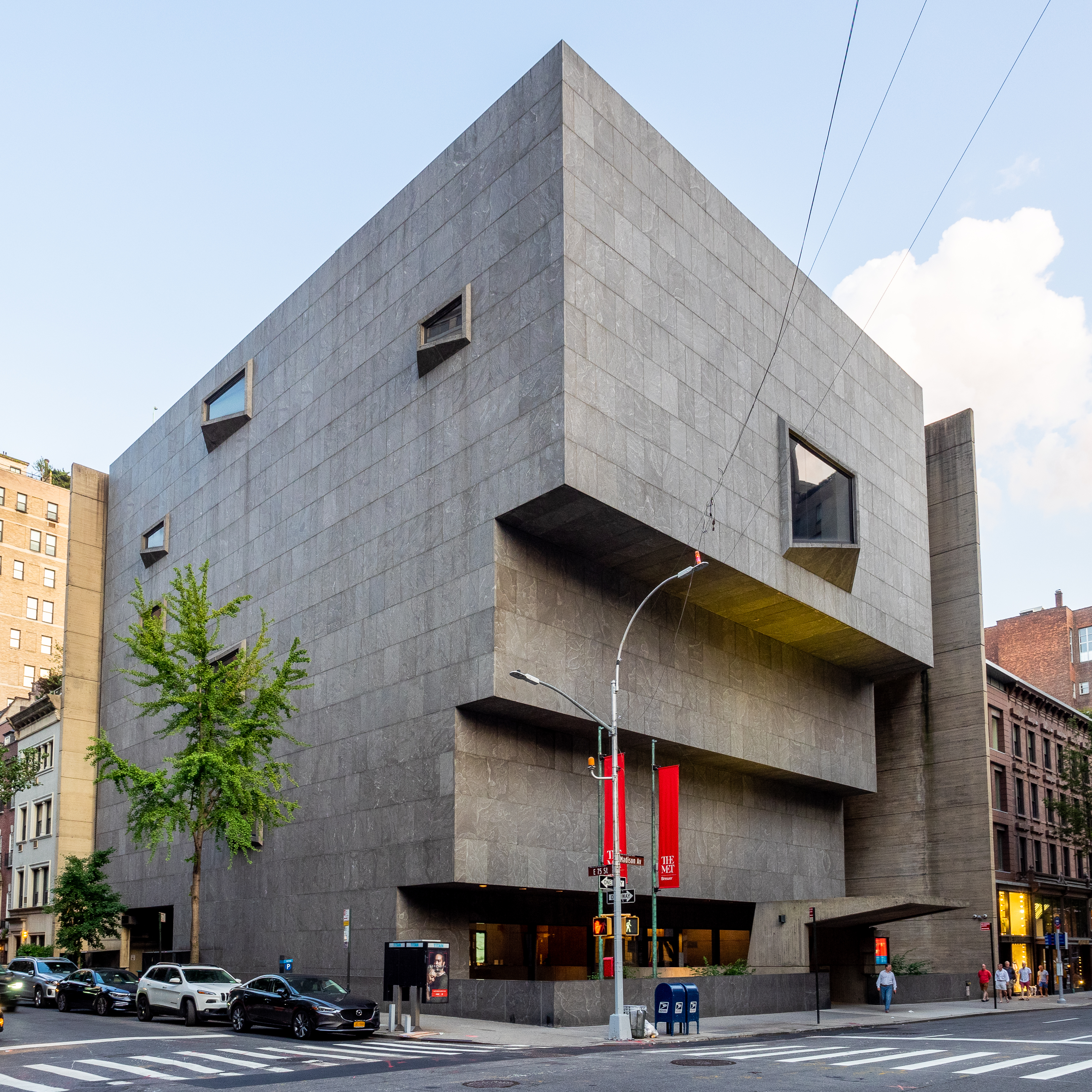
- Met Breuer Building (2019)
- Established: March 18, 2016
- Dissolved: March 13, 2020 (temporary closure); June 23, 2020 (permanent closure)
- Location: 945 Madison Avenue, New York, NY 10021
- Type: Art museum
- Public transit access: Subway: at 77th Street; Bus: M1, M2, M3, M4, M79 SBS
- Website: metmuseum.org/visit/met-breuer

The Met Breuer (/ˈbrɔɪ.ər/ BROY-ər) was a museum of modern and contemporary art in the Breuer Building at Madison Avenue and East 75th Street on the Upper East Side of Manhattan, New York City. It served as a branch museum of the Metropolitan Museum of Art (known as the Met) from 2016 to 2020.

The Met Breuer opened in March 2016 in the Whitney Museum of American Art's Breuer Building, designed by Marcel Breuer and completed in 1966. Its works came from the Met's collection, and it housed both monographic and thematic exhibitions.

In March 2020, the museum announced it would temporarily close due to the COVID-19 pandemic. Three months later, in June, the Met announced that the museum would close permanently. Control of the building was transferred to the Frick Collection between 2021 and 2024 during renovations to the Frick's main building, an arrangement which predated the COVID outbreak.

== History ==
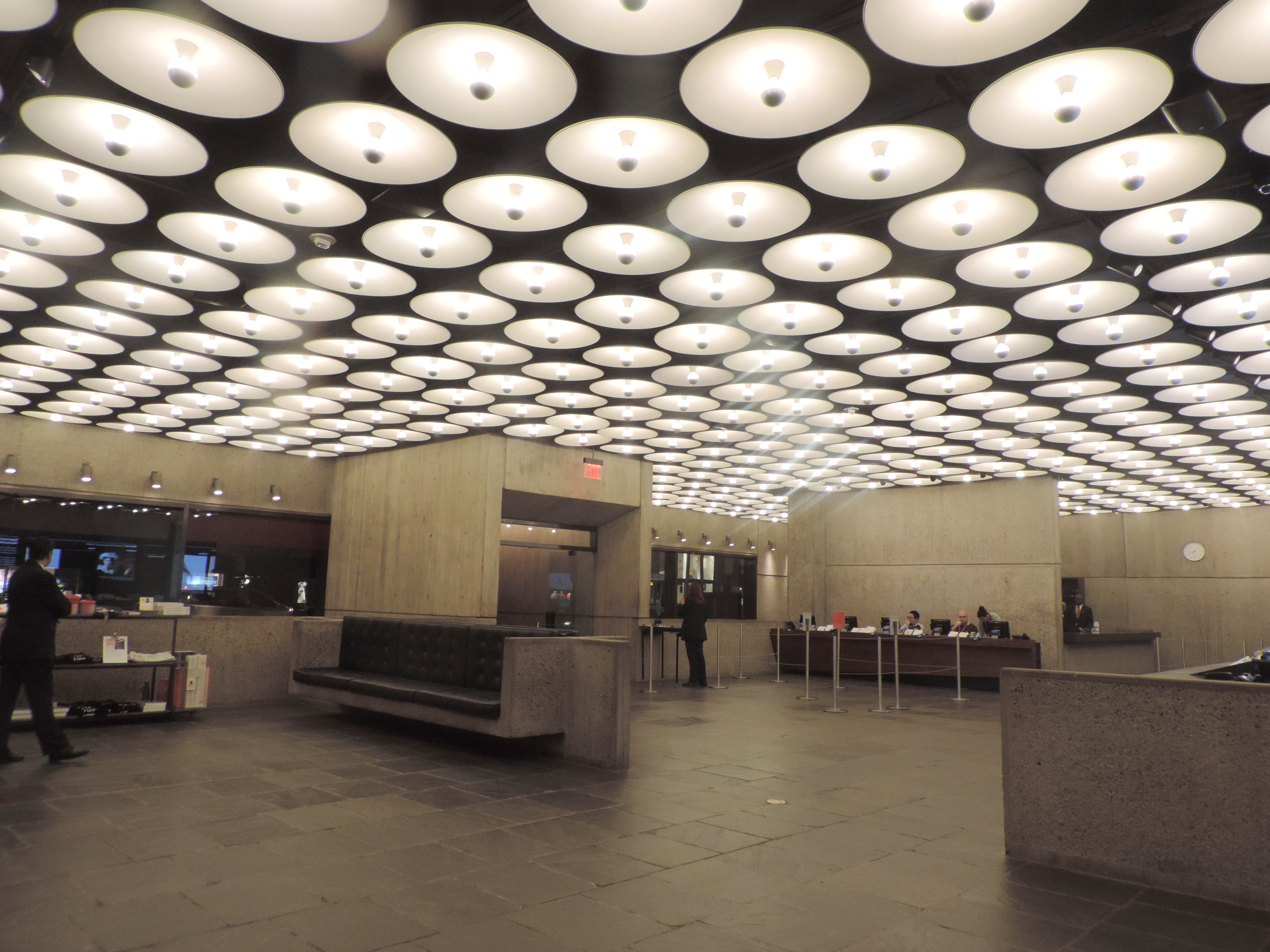
Renovated lobby

In 2008, the idea behind the Met Breuer project was initiated by philanthropist Leonard Lauder. An agreement between the Met and the Whitney was signed, after three years of negotiation, in 2011.

The location opened in March 2016 following a year and a half of preparations as part of a $600 million Metropolitan Museum of Art renovation plan. Architects Beyer Blinder Belle updated the Met Breuer building at 945 Madison Avenue, which had been designed by Marcel Breuer. The Met allocated an annual operating budget of $17 million to run the museum as part of an integrated expansion of the main museum's outreach, with a focus on modern art. The Met has an eight-year lease on the building from the Whitney Museum, with the option to renew another five and a half years, until approximately 2029.

The Met Breuer was overseen by Sheena Wagstaff, previously at the Tate Modern, who has been the head of the Modern and Contemporary Art Department of the Met since 2012. Director and CEO of the Met, Thomas P. Campbell, spearheaded the effort with a stated focus on the digital (moving from analog to digital) and focusing on accessibility and outreach. He considered the Met to be the largest encyclopedic museum in the world, with the Met Breuer an important part of that, especially as it works towards meaningfully engaging with a global audience, as well as the visitors who come to the museum in person. Both Campbell and Wagstaff saw the Met Breuer as a sculptural creation and artwork in its own right.

The opening featured a survey of Nasreen Mohamedi and "Unfinished: Thoughts Left Visible", an exhibit of incomplete works that ranged over 500 years, from Italian Renaissance to contemporary paintings. The exhibit notably featured Pablo Picasso's never-before-exhibited 1931 painting Woman in a Red Armchair as well as work by Kerry James Marshall, whose retrospective exhibition "Mastry" appeared at the Met Breuer in the autumn and winter of 2016–7.

In September 2018, it was announced that the Met intended to vacate the Met Breuer three years early, in 2020, with the Frick Collection temporarily occupying the space while its main building underwent renovations. The closure was a priority of incoming Met director Max Hollein, as it had an expensive lease, low attendance, and mixed reviews. Originally, the intention was that the Met would vacate the Met Breuer building in July following an exhibition of the works of Gerhard Richter. However, the onset of the COVID-19 pandemic forced the museum to close on March 13, just eight days after the Richter exhibit opened. In June 2020, it was announced that the Met Breuer would close permanently, with the Frick Collection occupying the building, as planned. The building subsequently reopened as the Frick Madison on March 18, 2021, housing the Frick until 2024.

== Reception ==
But the Met is huge and old, with a history of treating contemporary art as an afterthought. Getting it to change is like turning around an ocean liner; captain and crew are perhaps understandably proceeding cautiously.

— New York Times art critic Roberta Smith on the Met Breuer's opening, March 2016

In advance of the Met Breuer's opening, The New York Times art critic Roberta Smith wrote that the Metropolitan Museum of Art and other major art institutions feared to miss out as the rest of the art world displayed more contemporary art exhibitions. Smith said that the Met excelled at "bringing older art to life" and that the Met Breuer's cautious opening exhibit showed unclear goals for the new building. Wallpaper cited the renovations involved in the opening as being more representative of Breuer's design for the building, with a lower level sunken garden and a more welcoming emphasis on the sculptural design. The Architect's Newspaper sees the Met's approach as one that treats the building itself as an artwork versus a building, with a focus on the patina of the materials as part of a holistic entity.

Critics of the new endeavor challenged its mission to be less safe and salubratory, with a focus on engagement and innovation. The Met Breuer was to address the lack of collection activity of modern and contemporary art in the early to mid-1900s.

== Exhibitions ==
There were thirty-one exhibitions at the Met Breuer:

- March 18 – June 5, 2016: "Nasreen Mohamedi"
- March 18 – September 4, 2016: "Unfinished: Thoughts Left Visible"
- April 19 – September 25, 2016: "Tatsuo Miyajima: Arrow of Time (Unfinished Life)"
- July 12 – November 27, 2016: "diane arbus: in the beginning"
- September 1, 2016 – January 2, 2017: "Humor and Fantasy—The Berggruen Paul Klee Collection"
- October 25, 2016 – January 29, 2017: "Kerry James Marshall: Mastry"
- October 25, 2016 – January 29, 2017: "Kerry James Marshall Selects"
- January 24 – May 7, 2017: "Marisa Merz: The Sky Is a Great Space"
- February 1 – May 21, 2017: "Breuer Revisited: New Photographs by Luisa Lambri and Bas Princen"
- March 15 – June 18, 2017: "Marsden Hartley's Maine"
- March 21 – July 23, 2017: "Lygia Pape: A Multitude of Forms"
- June 20 – September 3, 2017: "The Body Politic: Video from The Met Collection"
- July 21 – October 8, 2017: "Ettore Sottsass: Design Radical"
- September 13, 2017 – January 14, 2018: "Delirious: Art at the Limits of Reason 1950–1980"
- October 11, 2017 – January 2, 2018: "Modernism on the Ganges: Raghubir Singh Photographs"
- November 15, 2017 – February 4, 2018: "Edvard Munch: Between the Clock and the Bed"
- December 13, 2017 – April 8, 2018: "Provocations: Anselm Kiefer at The Met Breuer"
- February 6 – May 27, 2018: "Leon Golub: Raw Nerve"
- March 21 – July 22, 2018: "Like Life: Sculpture, Color, and the Body (1300–Now)"
- July 3 – October 7, 2018: "Obsession: Nudes by Klimt, Schiele, and Picasso from the Scofield Thayer Collection"
- September 6 – December 2, 2018: "Odyssey: Jack Whitten Sculpture, 1963–2017"
- September 18, 2018 – January 6, 2019: "Everything Is Connected: Art and Conspiracy"
- December 4, 2018 – February 24, 2019: "Julio Le Parc 1959"
- January 23 – April 14, 2019: "Lucio Fontana: On the Threshold"
- February 20 – June 2, 2019: "Siah Armajani: Follow This Line"
- April 9, 2019 – March 12, 2020: "Home Is a Foreign Place: Recent Acquisitions in Context"
- June 4 – September 29, 2019: "Phenomenal Nature: Mrinalini Mukherjee"
- July 2 – August 11, 2019: "Oliver Beer: Vessel Orchestra"
- September 24, 2019 – January 12, 2020: "Vija Celmins: To Fix the Image in Memory"
- January 29 – March 12, 2020: "From Géricault to Rockburne: Selections from the Michael and Juliet Rubenstein Gift"
- March 4 – 12, 2020: "Gerhard Richter: Painting After All"

== Gallery ==
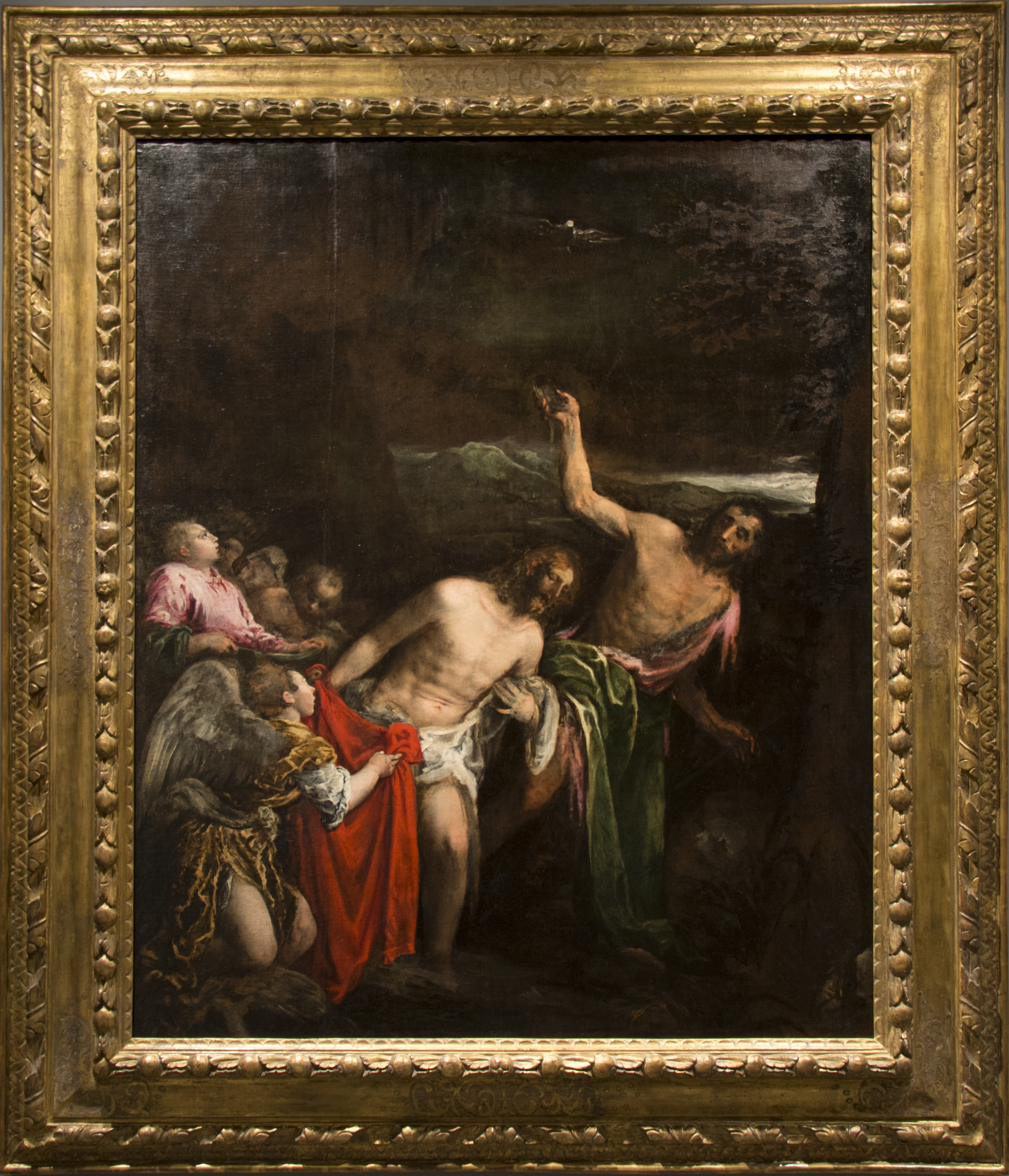
Jacopo Bassano
The Baptism of Christ
c. 1590

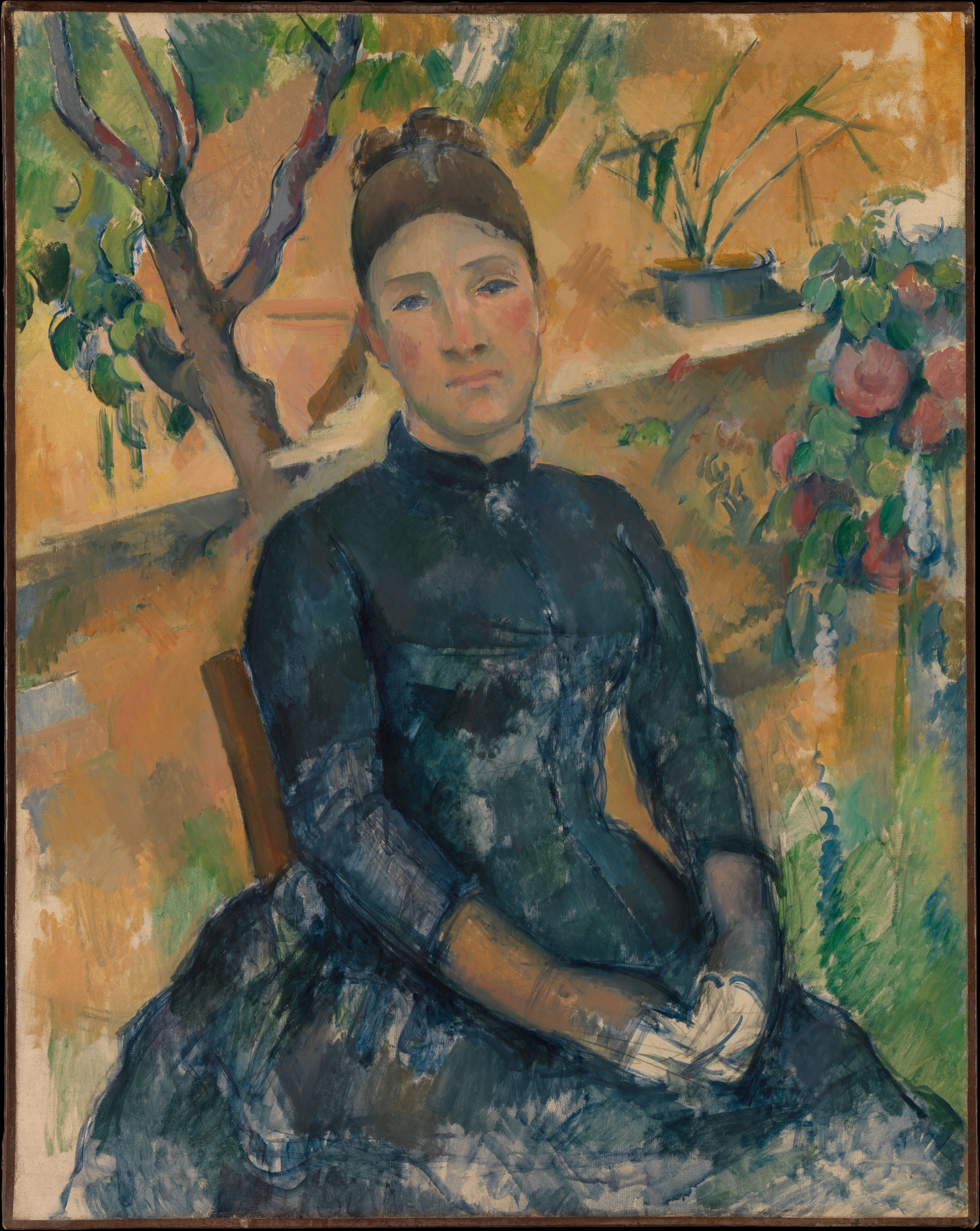
Paul Cézanne
Madame Cézanne in the Conservatory
1891

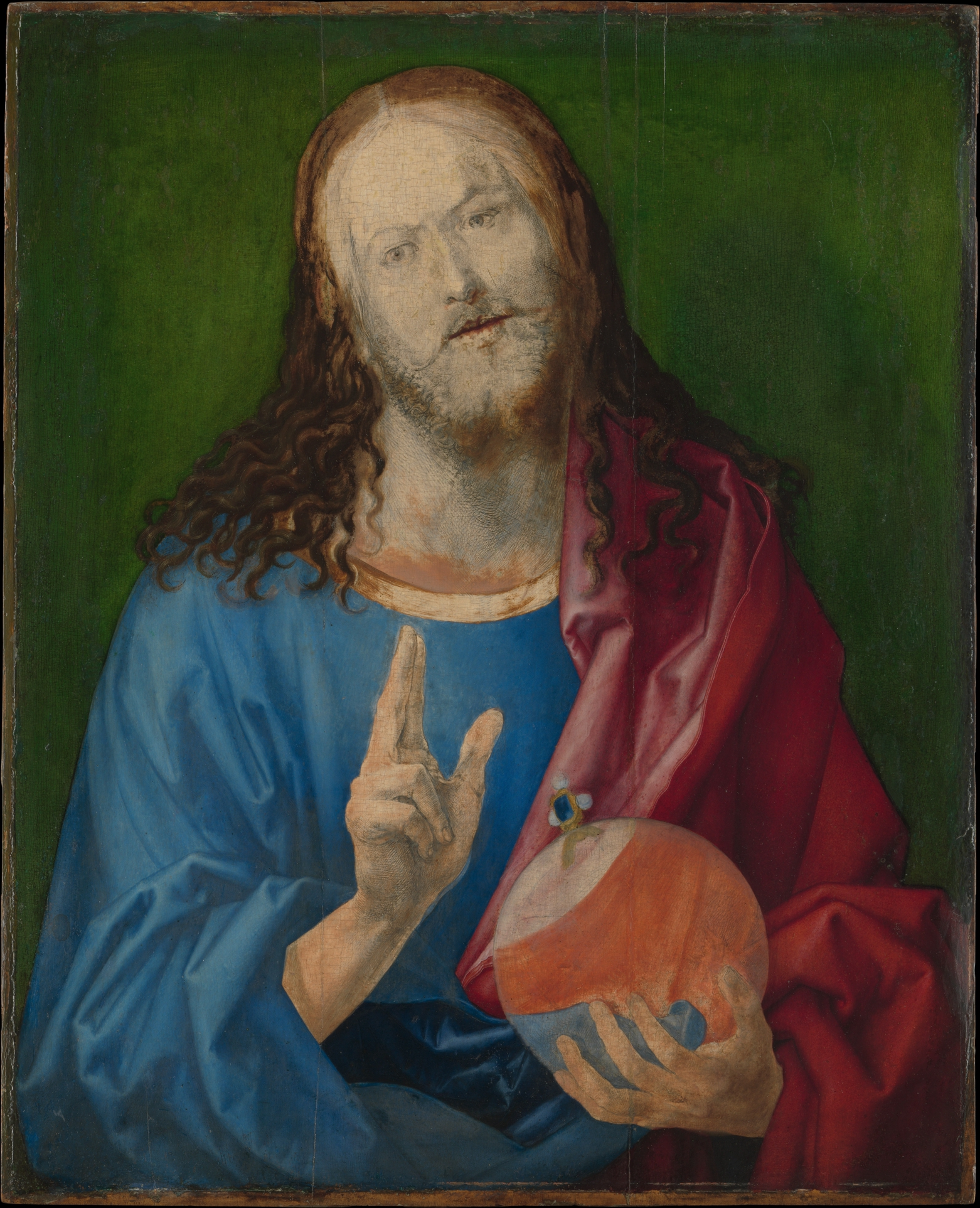
Albrecht Dürer
Salvator Mundi
c. 1505

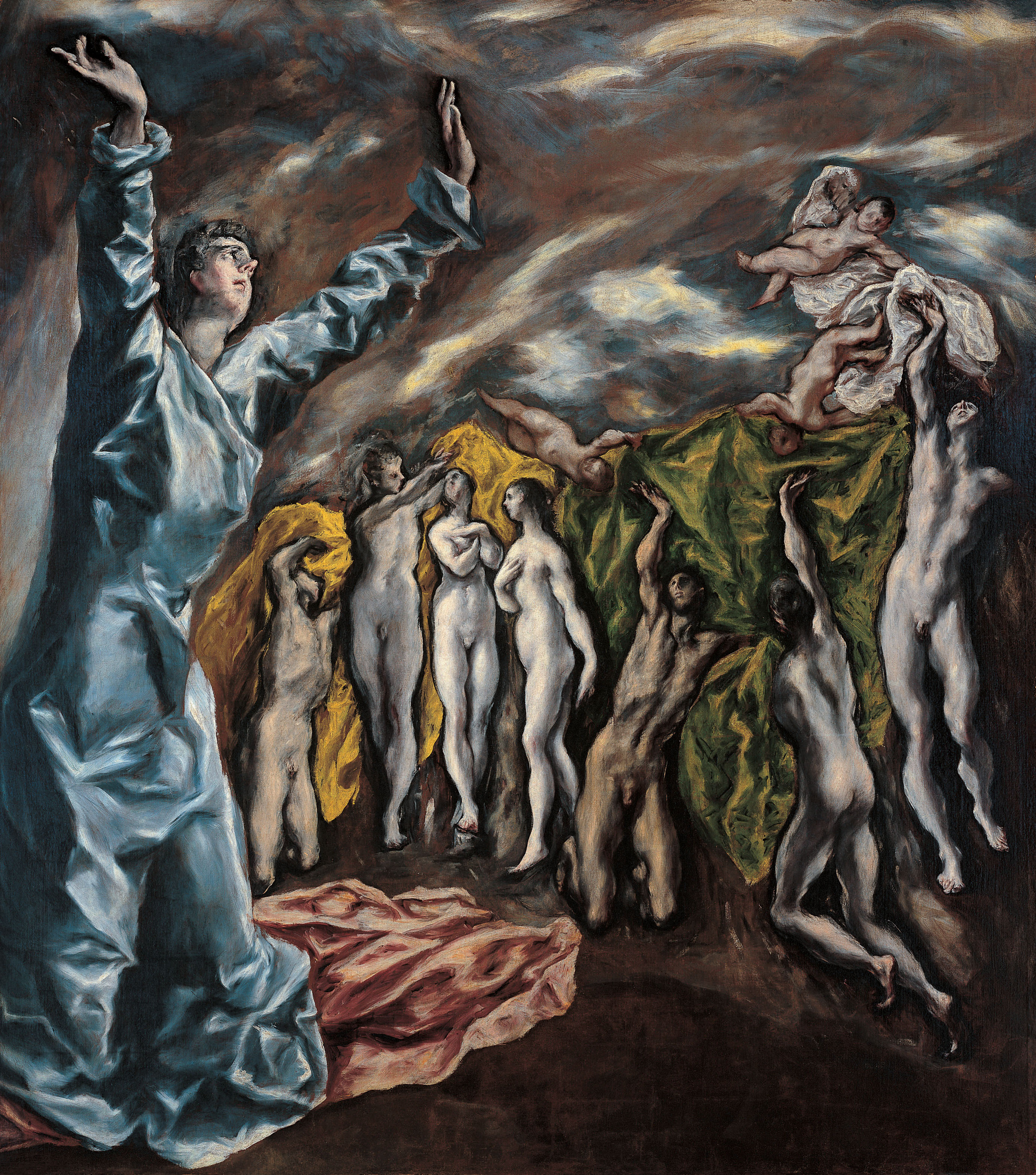
El Greco
The Vision of Saint John
c. 1609–14

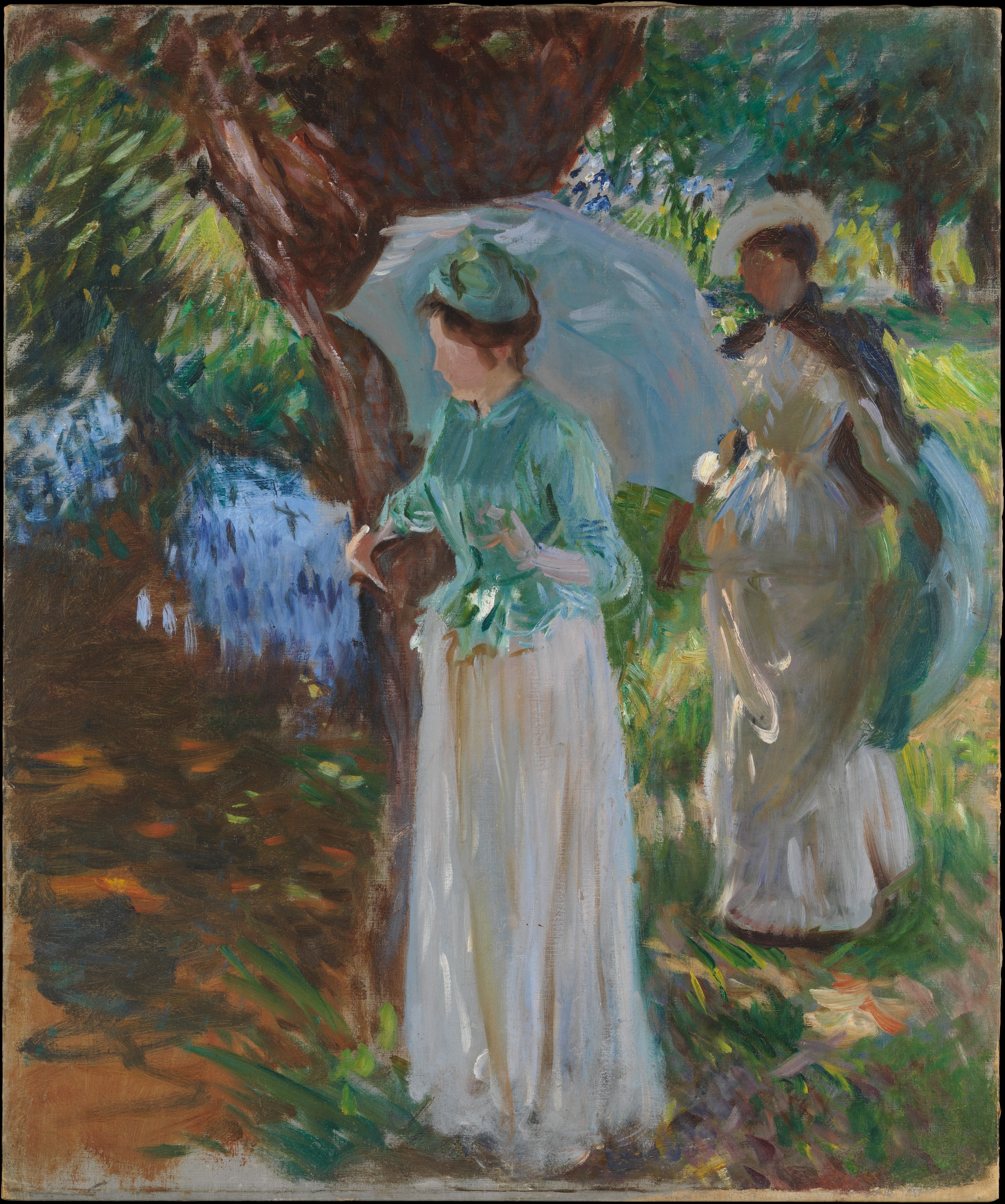
John Singer Sargent
Two Girls with Parasols
1889
