= Luisa Lambri =

Italian artist (born 1969)

- Born: 1969 (age 56–57); Como, Italy
- Education: University of Milan, University of Bologna
- Occupation: Photographer

Luisa Lambri (born 1969 in Como, Italy) is an Italian artist working with photography and film, based in Milan. Her photographs are often based on architecture and abstraction.

== Education ==
Lambri grew up in Como, Italy where she was exposed to the architecture of Giuseppe Terragni. In particular the Sant'Elia kindergarten, the Casa del Fascio and the Novocomum made a strong impressions on her. She subsequently studied at the Department of Modern Foreign Languages and Literatures, University of Milan and received her Ph.D. from the Department of Visual Arts, Music and Theater, University of Bologna.

== Work ==
Focusing primarily on photography, occasionally film, Lambri's work is characterized by an engagement with a broad spectrum of subjects revolving around the human condition and its relationship to space such as the politics of representation, the history of abstract photography, Feminism, Modernism, identity and history.

Seeing Modernism as a mostly male dominated social/cultural construction, Lambri captures the houses/spaces of iconic male architects with a deconstructing (female) gaze. Her works see the social concepts of space, place and gender as relational and as a product of demarcation. Here gender and space are a temporary result of a development of attribution that forms and reproduces structures. Lambri's practice is that of delocalization to counter the structural principles of society. Instead of representing entire houses (by architects such as Alvar Aalto, Mies van der Rohe, Marcel Breuer, Richard Neutra, Oscar Niemeyer, Luis Barragán, Le Corbusier, Frank Lloyd Wright, John Lautner, Rudolph Schindler, Giuseppe Terragni and others) the artist focuses on details, particularly windows, often light, closets or doors. Lambri has stated that her highly poetic abstractions do not represent the actual physical spaces she is photographing but rather introduce the experience of being in the spaces and being defined and reflected by both the physical but also the ideological weight of the structures.

Formally the works present themselves as lyrical and understated abstract compositions of lines, grids, which occasionally allow (undomesticated) organic material such a plants or flowers to take over the rigid forms. The minimal photographs reference abstract geometric painting from the early 20th century to evoke situations of transcendence and spirituality. The work is informed by such photographic pioneers as Paul Strand, Edward Weston or Tina Modotti and more contemporary artists such as Cindy Sherman or Vija Celmins. The Light and Space movement of Southern California, Brazilian neo-concrete art as well as Minimalism are frequent references. Recently Lambri photographed the work of Lygia Clark, Donald Judd and Robert Irwin. Lambri cites Gina Pane, Cindy Sherman, and Francesca Woodman as important influences. Currently the artist is focusing on a new series of photographs based on the work of Brazilian landscape architect Roberto Burle Marx.

Lambri works in series, often spending several years researching just one building or one architect. She mostly concentrates on domestic architecture.

Since 2000 Lambri has been closely associated with the work of Japanese architects Kazuyo Sejima and Ryue Nishizawa of the architectural office SANAA. The artist has photographed most of the buildings of SANAA and dedicated a number of exhibitions to their work. This series of work on contemporary architecture marks a departure from her previous focus on buildings of the past.

== Collections ==
Her work is present in various international museum collections:

- San Francisco Museum of Modern Art
- Solomon R. Guggenheim Museum, New York
- Museum of Contemporary Art, Los Angeles
- Colección Fundación Arco, Madrid
- Fondazione Sandretto Re Rebaudengo per l'Arte, Turin
- Galleria Nazionale d'Arte Moderna, Rome
- Hara Museum of Contemporary Art, Tokyo
- Kanazawa Museum for the 21st Century, Japan
- Rose Art Museum, Brandeis University, Waltham, Massachusetts

== Exhibitions ==
=== Solo ===
Lambri's solo exhibitions have been presented venues internationally, including the Hammer Museum in 2010, the Baltimore Museum of Art, the Menil Collection, the Isabella Stewart Gardner Museum, Baltimore Museum of Art in 2007 and the Fondazione Sandretto Re Rebaudengo, Guarene d’Alba, Italy. Her first US solo exhibition took place at Institute of Visual Arts, University of Wisconsin-Milwaukee in 1999 and her first UK solo exhibition was at Kettle's Yard, Cambridge University in 2000. In 2005 the Menil Collection in Houston organized her first survey exhibition. In 2010 the Hammer Museum in Los Angeles organized a retrospective of her work focusing on her photographs of West Coast architects. She had a two-person exhibition with Ernesto Neto at the Carnegie Museum of Art, Pittsburgh, 2006 as well as two person show with Bas Princen at Met Breuer titled "Breuer Revisited: New Photographs by Luisa Lambri and Bas Princen" (2017).

=== Group ===
Her photographs have appeared in many exhibitions around the world. Some museums and art institutions that presented Lambri's work include: Tate Modern, London; J. Paul Getty Museum, Los Angeles; Fotomuseum Winterthur; Henry Art Gallery, Seattle; Museum of Contemporary Art, Los Angeles; Museum of Contemporary Art Detroit; Albright-Knox Art Gallery, Buffalo; Los Angeles County Museum of Art, Los Angeles; Wattis Institute for Contemporary Arts, San Francisco; The Blanton Museum of Art, Austin; Solomon R. Guggenheim Museum, New York; Museo Tamayo, Mexico City; Huis Marseille, Museum for Photography, Amsterdam; Museum of Contemporary Art, Chicago; Museum of Modern Art, São Paulo; Mills College Art Museum, Oakland; Museo d’Arte Moderna di Bologna; Palazzo Grassi, Venice; The Aldrich Contemporary Art Museum, Ridgefield; Centro Cultural Banco do Brasil, Rio de Janeiro; Henry Moore Institute, Leeds; Fondazione Sandretto Re Rebaudengo, Turin; Staatliche Kunstsammlungen Dresden; New Museum of Contemporary Art, New York; Rose Art Museum, Brandeis University, Waltham; Museum of Contemporary Art, Tokyo; Yokohama Museum of Modern Art; Palazzo delle Papesse, Siena; Center for Curatorial Studies Museum, Bard College, Annandale-on-Hudson, New York; Galleria Nazionale d'Arte Moderna, Rome; Centre d’Art Contemporain Genève; Barbican Center, London in 2014.

=== Biennials ===
She has participated in a number of Biennials such as, the Venice Biennial in 1999 and 2003, the Venice Architecture Biennial in 2004 and 2010, 6th Liverpool Biennial in 2008, the 9th Shanghai Biennale in 2012, the 2nd Chicago Architecture Biennial in 2017, as well as the 1st Cleveland Triennial in 2018. Lambri was awarded the Golden Lion at 48th Venice Biennial in 1999 for the display of her work in the Italian Pavilion.
