= Oliver Beer (artist) =

British artist (born 1985)

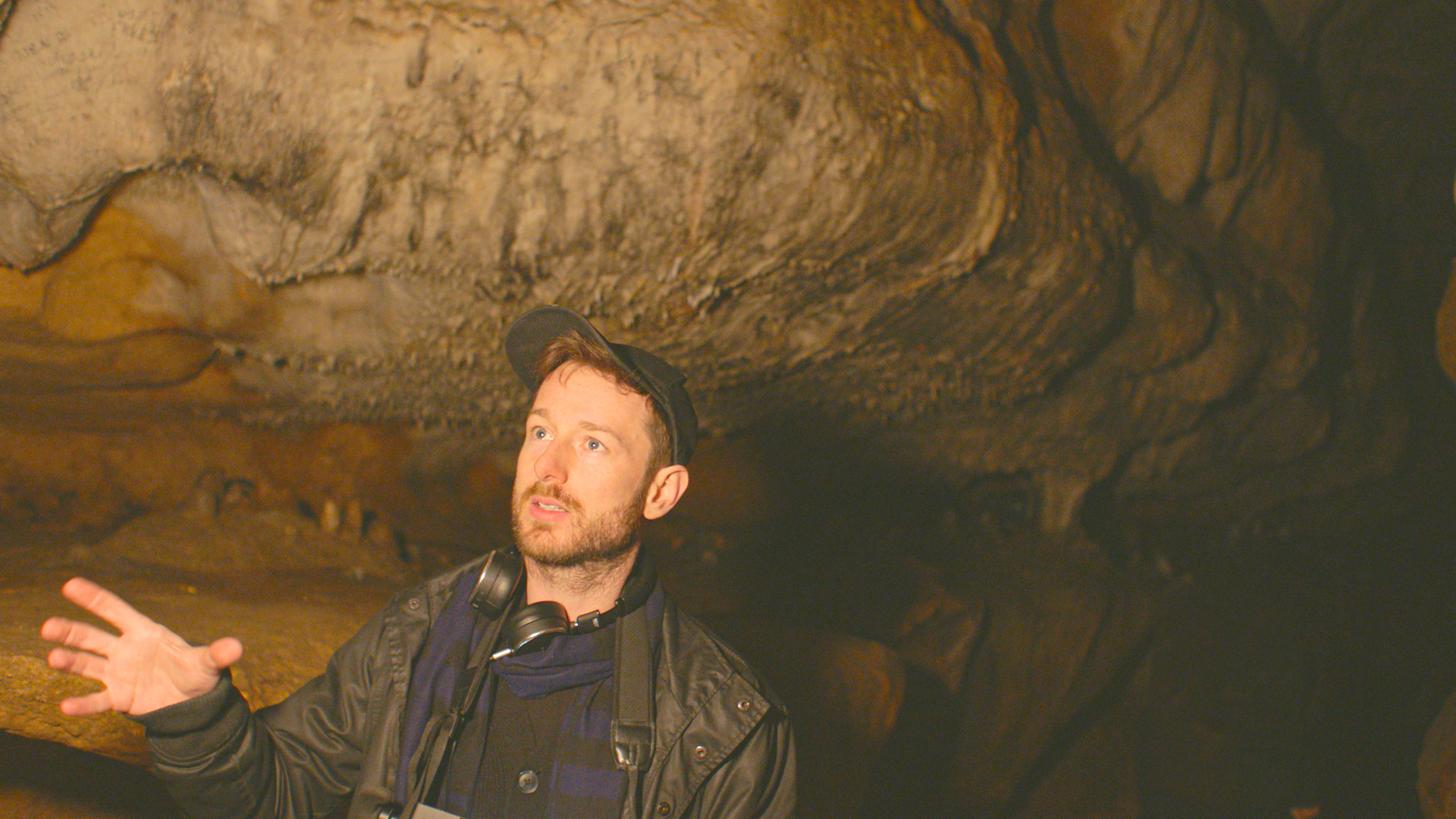
- Oliver Beer, Font de Gaume's prehistoric cave, 2024
- Born: 1985 (age 40–41)
- Education: Ruskin School of Drawing and Fine Art, University of Oxford
- Known for: Conceptual art, installation art, video art, sculpture
- Awards: Mondes Nouveaux
- Website: oliverbeer.co.uk

Oliver Beer (born 1985) is a British artist who lives and works between London and Paris. He makes sculptures, installations, videos, and immersive live performances.

== Biography ==
Oliver Beer studied musical composition at the Academy of Contemporary Music, London; visual art at the University of Oxford; and theory of cinema at the Sorbonne, Paris.

His background in both music and fine art led to an early interest in the relationship between sound and space, particularly the voice and architecture. He has translated his research into performances in which spectators take part and he makes sculptures and videos that embody the plastic expression of this relationship and the way the human body experiences it. Within and alongside his work with sound, Oliver Beer creates diverse sculpture, installation and film projects.

Beer's work has been the subject of many solo and group exhibitions, notably at Met Breuer, Metropolitan Museum of Art and MoMA PS1, New York; Centre Pompidou, Opéra Garnier, Fondation Louis Vuitton, Palais de Tokyo and Château of Versailles, Paris; the macLyon, Lyon; Ikon Gallery, Birmingham; WIELS, Brussels and the Sydney and Istanbul biennales. Beer was included in the British Art Show 9 and has also held residencies at the Palais de Tokyo, the Watermill Centre, Sydney Opera House and the Fondation Hermès.

== Solo exhibitions ==
2025
- Musée d’Art Moderne de Paris, Paris, France, Oliver Beer « Reanimation Paintings: A Thousand Voices », A two-stage project: Chapter 1: Drawing and sound collection workshops (4 October 2024 – 12 January 2025) and Chapter 2: Immersive exhibition of the films produced by Oliver Beer (4 April – 13 July 2025)
2024
- Almine Rech Tribeca, New York, USA, Resonance Paintings - Cat Orchestra, 14 March – 27 April 2024
2023
- Thaddaeus Ropac gallery, Salzburg, Austria, Oliver Beer: Resonance Paintings - Blue Notes, 28 January – 18 March 2023
- Almine Rech, Shanghai, China, Recompositions: Night Revels, 12 May – 24 June 2023
- London Mithraeum Bloomberg SPACE, London, UK, Albion Waves, 9 February – 15 July 2023
2022
- Thaddaeus Ropac gallery, Seoul, South Korea, Oliver Beer: Resonance Paintings - Two Notes, 3 May – 11 June 2022
- British Art Show 9, Hayward Gallery Touring, The Box, KARST, The Arts Institute's Levinsky Gallery, The Gallery at Plymouth College of Art, Plymouth, UK, Household Gods
2021
- Opéra Garnier, Paris, France, Composition for Mouths (Songs My Mother Taught Me), 29 September – 2 October 2021
2020
- Thaddaeus Ropac gallery, London, UK, Oliver Beer: Oma
2019

- Met Breuer, New York, USA, Vessel Orchestra, 2 July – 11 August 2019
- Galerie des Arts Visuels, Quebec City, Canada, Recomposition (Baloo Stripped Bare), 16 February – 21 April 2019
- University of New South Wales Gallery, Sydney, Australia, Impossible Composition, 1–23 February 2019
- Galerie Thaddaeus Ropac, Paris, France, Household Gods, 12 January – 16 February 2019

2018

- Anna Schwartz Gallery, Melbourne Impossible Composition curated by Anaïs Lellouche, 24 March – 21 April 2018 George Eastman Museum, Rochester, NY, USA
- Reanimation (Snow White), Video Presentation, 30 October 2018 – 1 January 2019 Ruya Foundation, Baghdad, Iraq
- Reanimation (Alice Falling), Video Presentation, 16 November – 8 December 2018

2017

- THADDAEUS ROPAC GALLERY, Ely House, London, UK, New Performance and Sculpture, 28 April 2017 – 29 July 2017
- IKON GALLERY, Birmingham, UK, Solo exhibition, 15 March – 14 June 2017

2016

- POMPIDOU CENTRE, Paris, France, Polyphonies curated by Christine Macel 19 October 2016 – 23 January 2017
- NUIT BLANCHE, Paris, 2016 Live Stream, Pont des Arts, Paris, France, 1 October 2016
- VG PRIZE EXHIBITION, London, UK August–September 2016
- FRAENKEL LAB, San Francisco, USA, Reanimation (Snow White), January 2016

2015

- AOYAMA MEGURO, Tokyo, Life, Death and Tennis. Daiwa Art Prize 2015 solo exhibition November–December 2015
- ASAKUSA HOUSE, Tokyo, Deconstructing Sound, Daiwa Art Prize 2015 solo exhibition November–December 2015
- WATERMILL CENTER, New York, Making Tristan, Watermill Center artist in residence September 2015
- KILIC ALI PASA HAMAM, Istanbul, Call to Sound, Galerie Thaddaeus Ropac / Istanbul Biennale September 2015
- DAIWA ART PRIZE 2015, London, Daiwa Foundation Art Prize Exhibition, 12 June – 17 July 2015

2014

- Diabolus in Musica, Galerie Thaddaeus Ropac, Pantin, France (Septembre 2014)
- Rabbit Hole, Oliver Beer, MAC Lyon, Lyon, France (6 Juin – 17 Août 2014)
- Prospectif Cinéma – Oliver Beer, Pompidou Centre, Paris, France (22 May 2014)
- Sunday Sessions, MoMA PS1, New York, USA (6 April 2014)

2013

- Composition for Hearing an Architectural space, Galerie Thaddaeus Ropac, Pantin, France
- Oliver Beer, Villa Arson, Nice, France
- Outside-In, Ikon Gallery, Birmingham (permanent installation), UK
- Out of Shot, Silencio, Paris, France

2012

- Klang, Palais de Tokyo, Paris, France

2011

- Pay and Display, Ikon Gallery, Birmingham, UK

2010

- Deep and Meaningful, MurmurART, 20 Hoxton Square, London, UK
- Training, Ikon Gallery, Birmingham (Tower Room), UK

2009

- Die Budgie History, Dolphin Gallery, Oxford, UK

2008

- The Resonance Project, Abbazia di Farfa, Rome, Italy

2007

- Oliver Beer, La Viande Gallery, London, UK

== Public collections ==
- Centre national des arts plastiques, France
- FRAC (Fond Régional d'Art Contemporain), Île-de-France, France
- FRAC, Midi-Pyrénées, Les Abattoirs, Toulouse, France
- Musée d'art contemporain de Lyon, Lyon, France
- Musée National d'Art Moderne, Centre Pompidou, Paris
- MACVAL, Ivry-sur-Seine, France
- Nouveau Musée National de Monaco, France
- Museum of Old and New Art (MONA), Australia
- Fondation Louis Vuitton, Paris, France
- National Museum of Art, Osaka, Japan
- Museum Voorlinden, Wassenaar, Netherlands
- IKON Gallery, Birmingham, UK
- Zabludowicz 176 Collection, London, UK
- Kramlich Collection, San Francisco, USA

== Bibliography ==
- 2022 Oliver Beer, Resonance Paintings by Thaddaeus Ropac gallery
- 2017 Oliver Beer, Composition for London by Galerie Thaddaeus Ropac
- 2017 Oliver Beer by Jonathan Watkins (ed.) Ikon Gallery
- 2014 Rabbit Hole, Oliver Beer, co-edited by Mac Lyon and Galerie Thaddaeus Ropac, texts by Thierry Raspail, Jonathan Wattkins, Rebecca Lamarche-Vadel, Isabelle Bertolotti and Matthieu Lelièvre.
- 2014 Oliver Beer : topologies singulières, 02 magazine, text by Ingrid Luquet-Gad
- 2013 Oliver Beer, cahier de résidence. Fondation Hermès, text by Clément Dirier, Editions Actes Sud
- 2013 Voyage en territoires partagés, dir. Charlotte Moth, including a text by Oliver Beer, Editions Cercle d'Art
- 2013 Expérienz, Art Même No. 58
- 2013 The Resonance Project, Dante No. 4
- 2012 Arts Magazine April issue Oliver Beer: Echologiste by Francois Quintin
- 2012 Cahiers de résidence: Oliver Beer by Actes Sud / Fondation d'entreprise Hermès (ed.)
- 2012 Palais Magazine No. 16, Composition for tuning an architectural space insert. Editions Palais de Tokyo
