= Jennie Alexander =

American woodworker (1930–2018)

- Born: John David Alexander Jr. December 8, 1930
- Died: July 12, 2018 (aged 87)
- Education: University of Maryland
- Known for: Make a Chair from a Tree: An Introduction to Working Green Wood

Jennie Alexander, born John David Alexander Jr, (December 8, 1930 – July 12, 2018) was an American woodworker and author of books on greenwoodworking who transitioned at the age of 77.

== Background ==
Alexander spent early childhood in Baltimore, Maryland, learning to play the piano and later became a Jazz musician. Having been introduced to woodworking at the Baltimore polytechnic institute High School, Alexander would later go on to open a home shop in 1960.

Alexander’s mother grew up in Quincy, Massachusetts, and was part of the educational sloyd system. Because of this Alexander was always encouraged to explore woodworking and learning through doing. Alexander, whose father was a lawyer, also attended law school at the university of Maryland becoming a divorce lawyer, but embraced greenwoodworking as an avocation, both practicing greenwoodworking, and studying the history of greenwoodworking by examining furniture at museums, private collections, auction houses, etc.

After marrying and having three daughters together, Alexander's wife, Joyce, died in 1996. Alexander eventually had five grandchildren and three great-grandchildren; one of whom is John D. Alexander III.

Born as John David Alexander Jr., Alexander transitioned in 2007, becoming Jennie Alexander, at the age of 77.

== Career ==
In 1978, Alexander wrote, Make a Chair from a Tree: An Introduction to Working Green Wood, which was the first woodworking book published by Taunton Press. This book describes the process and tools required to construct a shaved two-slat post-and-rung chair without the use of a wood lathe. Becoming a member of the Early American Industries Association (EAIA) which was a crucial step in Alexander’s exploration of woodworking and chair making as it gave access to collections of joined furniture. Alexander also demonstrated how to make the shaved two-slat post-and-rung chair at an event hosted by EAIA and later taught classes at Drew Langsner's Country Workshops in North Carolina, mentoring many students.

At Country Workshops she met Peter Follansbee, and after years of corresponding, would go on to co write a book with him called, Make a Joint Stool from a Tree: An Introduction to 17th-Century Joinery. She spent her later years mentoring many in greenwoodworking techniques and joinery. Jennie died July 12, 2018.

== Two-slat post-and-rung shaving chair ==
Jennie Alexander had attributed the success of the post-and-rung shaving chair to her wife, who after Jennie was told she could not wood turn in front of a live audience, encouraged Jennie to make the same chair by shaving all the parts close to round without a lathe. Jennie said, "So the shaving, really, made the existence of the post-and-rung chair a reality in this country."

From her book, Make a Chair from a Tree: An Introduction to Working Green Wood:

A post and rung chair is a stick chair with a fiber seat. It has cylindrical mortises bored into vertical posts to receive the ends of horizontal rungs. When the chair is first assembled, the posts contain more moisture than the rungs. The chair is held together by the shrinking of the posts around the dry rungs. It is one of the few things made today that depends on the shrinking actions of wood.

This chair differs in part from the Windsor chair because it does not have a solid carved seat. In a Ladderback Chair, the seat is not structural. Where in a Windsor chair, the seat is structural - all the legs, back and arms terminate in the seat.

== Education ==
- High School Baltimore City Polytechnic Institute
- St. John's College
- University of Maryland

== Publications ==
- Make a Chair from a Tree: An Introduction to Working Green Wood
- Make a Joint Stool from a Tree: An Introduction to 17th-century Joinery (co-written with Peter Follansbee)

== See also ==
- Woodturning
- Woodworking
- Joiner
- Sloyd
- List of chairs
