= Daniel Trotter =

American furniture maker

Daniel Trotter (1747-1800) was an American furniture maker.

== Biography ==
Daniel Trotter was born in 1747 in Philadelphia, to William Trotter, a shoemaker, and his wife Elizabeth, who had six children altogether. His father died when Daniel was twelve, and his mother died four years after. His father was a Quaker, and Daniel likely received schooling provided by the Quaker Society. At that time, Anthony Benezet and Robert Proud were teachers there. Around age 14 he was apprenticed to cabinet maker William Wayne. Making furniture and woodcraft ran in the family: His great-uncle Benjamin Trotter (also a "zealous Preacher") was a chair maker; Joseph Trotter, his uncle, was a joiner. Two of his cousins were trained as cabinet makers, and Joseph, his older brother, was a chair maker. By 1768 he was finished as an apprentice, and by 1771 he had a partner, John Webb, also a Quaker: such partnerships for a limited number of years were common among Quakers, and in 1774 Webb and Trotter ended their relationship.

In December 1773 he married Elizabeth Conarroe, also from a Quaker family, and they rented a house on Elfreth's Alley. From 1775 to 1779 he and an apprentice ran a shop on Water Street, but during the American Revolutionary War, times were hard: because Quakers were not allowed to do military service he had to pay fines, and the depressed incomes in America at the time already slowed down demand on luxury items. By 1783 or thereabouts, his business was doing well enough to raise his income above that of the average person in his trade, and tax records throughout the 1780s prove increasing success. He also occupied a number of administrative positions of importance in his church. In 1789 he joined the Pennsylvania Abolition Society and was nominated to the Action Committee, where he attended weekly meetings; he remained a member the rest of his life. He bought a share in the Library Company of Philadelphia, and built up a collection of books evidencing his "rather pedestrian taste" in reading.

His business success enabled him to buy 12 acres of land in 1781, in Springfield Township, Burlington County, and in 1791 he bought 411 acres in Northampton County, Pennsylvania, where a number of notable Philadelphians were investing in land. He bought properties in Philadelphia as well, and in 1783 he bought the house he and his wife had been renting on Elfreth's Alley, and in the following years continued to buy, and also sell, real estate in the city. He built two shops (one for his business) on land he owned nearby, and in May 1795 he sold the house on Elfreth's Alley and moved the family to a new home on nearby Front Street. Their new house was relatively new, and had three stories; the Trotter family lived comfortably and enjoyed luxuries (in ornaments and dress) that made some Quakers cringe, because it jarred with the required plainness of living for Quakers.

He died early in May 1800 of "lingering illness".

== Workmanship ==
Trotter made six mahogany ladderback chairs for the banker and slave owner Stephen Girard in 1786; they are cited as an example of a "more modest" neoclassical style that was making inroads in Philadelphia. Connected to this set of chairs is a Pembroke table, 1785–95. Other chairs that resemble Trotter's are frequently ascribed to him, including two in the collection of the Metropolitan Museum of Art, but those two have details that suggest they are not his.
