= Jorinde Voigt =

German artist (born 1977)

- Born: 1977 (age 48–49); Germany
- Citizenship: German
- Education: Berlin University of the Arts
- Website: jorindevoigt.com

Jorinde Voigt (born 1977) is a German visual artist based in Berlin who creates large-scale ink drawings inspired by musical scores, philosophical concepts, and phenomenological methods. She is a professor of conceptual drawing and painting at the University of Fine Arts in Hamburg.

== Work ==
Critics have compared Voigt's works to those of minimalist and conceptual artists, specifically the event scores and visual artworks of 20th-century avant-garde composers John Cage and Iannis Xenakis, the algorithmic patterns of Hanne Darboven, and the procedural parameters of Sol LeWitt.

In 2002, Voigt began making drawings that have been described as projection surfaces, visualized thought models, scientific experimental designs, notations, scores, and diagrams. In 2003, she developed a system in the series Notations, Florida, and Indonesia. These drawings record the artist's impressions while traveling from Orlando to Miami. Further work cycles, developed from the study of perception, were established in this early series.

=== Views on Chinese Erotic Art from 16th to 20th Century (2011–2012) ===
Voigt's series, Views on Chinese Erotic Art from 16th to 20th Century, is inspired by historic Chinese erotic paintings and prints. After studying these images, Voigt created a series of collage works, visually deconstructing the subject matter. The collages bear a resemblance to scientific charts, or diagrams.

Poet and critic John Yau wrote, "by unraveling the erotic views into their constituent parts, the artist essentially undresses the encounter, turning it into a collection of visual and written data."

=== Piece for Words and Views (2012) and Love as Passion: On the Codification of Intimacy (2013–2014) ===
In the Piece for Words and Views work cycle, the subject matter changed from visual analysis of objects or scenarios to attempting to visualize internal, invisible processes. The cycle consists of a series of contour drawings on colored vellum, each associating a color and form with a particular piece of text from A Lover's Discourse by Roland Barthes. These pieces were collaged to form a final drawing.

In Voigt's 48-part series Love as Passion: On the Codification of Intimacy, a passage from Niklas Luhmann's 1982 book by the same name is distilled into a drawing.

=== Immersion (2018–2019) ===
With Immersion, Voigt sought to develop appropriate forms to understand the inner constitution of archetypal images and how to share or experience such images collectively. Central elements in these works include the torus, arrows, axes, and lines. Voigt commences each work in the Immersion series by immersing paper in pigment. Each color denotes a particular atmosphere or emotional state. A large torus figure forms the central element of the composition, while every variation features a change in its dimensions. Voigt describes Immersion as a "time-based series", with each piece created one after the other and intended to reflect an individual moment in time. "When you look at the series as a whole, you can see the exact connection between those moments," Voigt explains. "In real life, you focus on each moment at a time, and you can't stop and zoom out to see the bigger picture."

== Museum collections ==
Jorinde Voigt's work is showcased in various collections internationally, including: the Centre Pompidou, Paris; Museum of Modern Art, New York; Art Institute of Chicago; Kupferstichkabinett Berlin; İstanbul Modern; Federal Art Collection (Bundeskunsthalle), Bonn; the Hamburger Kunsthalle, Hamburg; Kunsthaus Zürich; Kunstmuseum Stuttgart; Norwegian Museum of Contemporary Art, Oslo; and Grafische Sammlung, Munich.

== Selected exhibitions ==
- 2025 Jorinde Voigt – Marc Selwyn Fine Arts, LA
- 2025 Music Inspiration: Beethoven's Compositions in Modern Art – David Nolan Gallery, New York
- 2023 Jorinde Voigt: The Match – David Nolan Gallery, New York
- 2021 Jorinde Voigt: Trust and Rain – David Nolan Gallery, New York
- 2020 Jorinde Voigt: The State of Play – David Nolan Gallery, New York
- 2019 Wall Drawings Series: Jorinde Voigt – Menil Drawing Institute, Houston
- 2019 Jorinde Voigt: Universal Turn – Horst-Janssen-Museum, Oldenburg
- 2018 Jorinde Voigt: Integral – David Nolan Gallery, New York
- 2018 Jorinde Voigt: Divine Territory – St. Matthäus Church, Berlin
- 2017 Jorinde Voigt: A New Kind of Joy – Kunsthalle Nürnberg
- 2016 Jorinde Voigt: Considerations in the Now – David Nolan Gallery, New York
- 2014 Jorinde Voigt: Codification of Intimacy. Works on Niklas Luhmann – David Nolan Gallery, New York
- 2014 Jorinde Voigt: Superpassion – MACRO, Museum of Contemporary Art of Rome, Rome
- 2013 Jorinde Voigt: Systematic Notations – Nevada Museum of Art NMA
- 2011 Jorinde Voigt: Von der Heydt Museum – Wuppertal
- 2010 Jorinde Voigt: STAAT / Random I-XI – Gemeentemuseum Den Haag
- 2009 Jorinde Voigt: Symphonic Area – HDKV Heidelberger Kunstverein
- 2008 Jorinde Voigt: DUAL – NKV Nassauischer Kunstverein Wiesbaden
