= John Kassay =

American craftsman, draftsman and photographer

John Kassay (1919 in Bayonne, New Jersey – February 17, 2004, in San Bruno, California) was an expert in Shaker and Windsor furniture as well as a skilled craftsman, draftsman and photographer. He published The Book of Shaker Furniture in 1980 and The Book of American Windsor Furniture: Styles and Technologies in 1998.

== Early life ==
John Kassay graduated from North Tarrytown High School in 1938. Kassay earned a Purple Heart and a Bronze Star while serving in Gen. George S. Patton's Third Army in the Second World War.

He married Mary Brunner after the war and attended East Central University (B.A. 1949) and Pittsburg State University in Kansas (M.A. 1950) on the GI Bill. He completed a doctorate in education at Washington State University in 1970.

== Career ==
Kassay taught industrial arts in junior and senior high schools in Kansas and, for over thirty years, at San Francisco State University, where he was professor in the Department of Design and Industry. Kassay taught courses in woodworking technology and construction at San Francisco State, running "probably the finest woodworking program in America" according to Tom McFadden in Cabinet Maker magazine.

In 1980, Kassay published The Book of Shaker Furniture to wide acclaim. The book featured his own illustrations based on years of research. The book was universally praised for its exquisitely rendered and finely detailed drawings of Shaker furniture.

When former President Jimmy Carter received Kassay's book on Shaker furniture in late 1983, he wrote at the bottom of the official typed reply letter: "I've long admired the beautiful simplicity of Shaker furniture and have made several of their pieces myself. Merry Christmas. JC."

Kassay later turned his attention to American Windsor furniture and produced an elegant and informative guide to the Windsor style. He continued to lecture and publish on both styles after being awarded emeritus status in 1987.

In addition to his books, Professor Kassay also was a frequent contributor to woodworking and industrial arts journals.

== Works ==
- Kassay, John (1980). The Book of Shaker Furniture. Amherst: University of Massachusetts Press. ISBN 0-87023-275-4.
- Kassay, John (1998). The Book of American Windsor Furniture: Styles and Technologies. Amherst: University of Massachusetts Press. ISBN 1-55849-137-6.
