= Ladderback chair =

Chair backed with spindles or slats

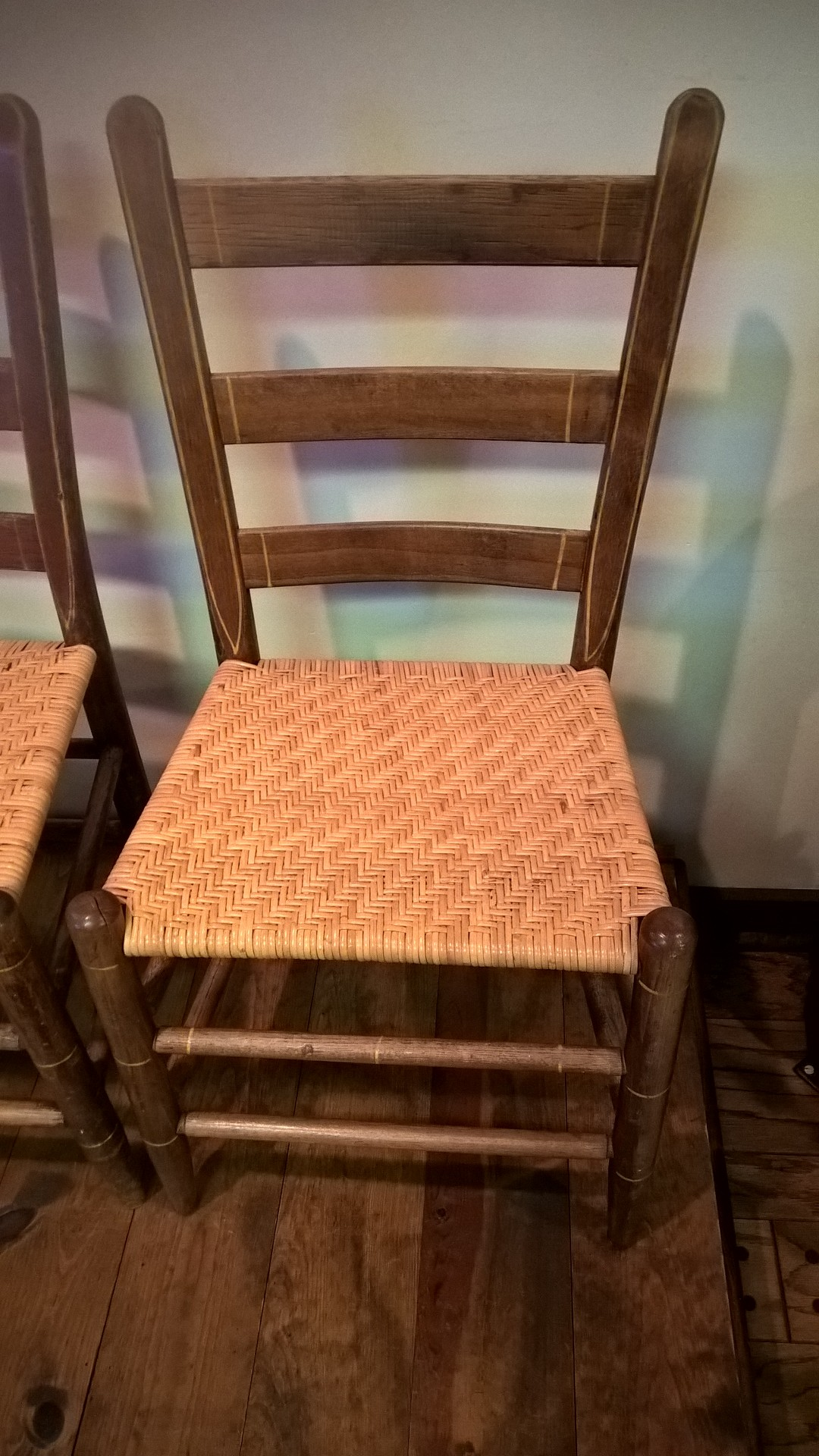
A typical ladderback chair

A ladderback chair, also ladder-back chair, slatback chair or fiddle back although that name is used less now due to the creation of the fiddle back chair. It gets its name from the horizontal spindles that serve as the back support on them and are reminiscent of a ladder.

== Description ==
Ladderback chairs tend to have tall backs with two uprights. Between these two uprights exists multiple horizontal spindles or slats (three in the picture to the right). The seat can be made of a variety of different materials. Originally the majority of seats were constructed using cane or rush, whereas now, the seats tend to be made of wood. The top slat may be larger than the other slats, pierced, or have a hole in the center, as a utility that makes carrying the chair easier. The larger top slat could also be easily decorated and adorned.

== History ==
Ladderback chairs date back to the Middle Ages where they can be found in homes across Europe. By the 17th century, this style of chair was among the most common style in England. By the middle of the 17th century, luxury furniture makers began to make ladder-back chairs out of walnut, rather than the more common sycamore or maple and added refined decorations and engravings. The chairs became staples in homes across colonial America. They still remain among the most popular types of chairs. The Metropolitan Museum of Art purchased a ladder-back chair, which was considered a peasant's chair, and was dated between the 17th and 18th centuries, in 1908. It owns a pair of them made in Philadelphia between 1785–95 that resembles chairs made by Philadelphia furniture maker Daniel Trotter (1747–1800).

== Production ==
Production of the several different parts of the chair required a different set of tools than other chairs popular during the 18th century in colonial America like the Windsor chair and formal sidechairs. Creating the cylindrical pieces of a ladder-back chair, such as the legs, occasionally the uprights, or the spindles, were most easily created using a turner's chisels and gouges as the wood spun on a lathe. Meanwhile, the slats along the back of the chair required several different sizes of saws and a plane. The ladderback chair's seat was formed using a drawknife when the seat was made of wood, otherwise, it was woven using cane or rush.

== See also ==
- Shaker tilting chair
- Jennie Alexander
- Philip Clissett
- List of chairs
