= Shaker tilting chair =

Chair with swiveling feet

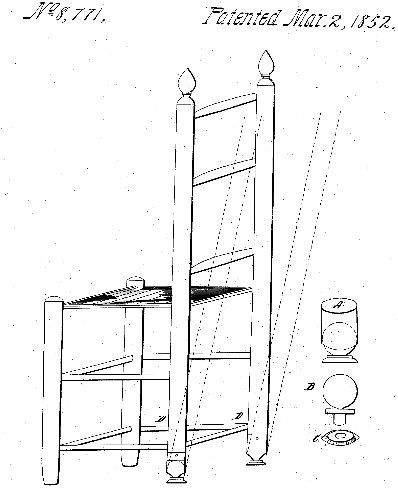
U.S. Patent No 8771 drawing image

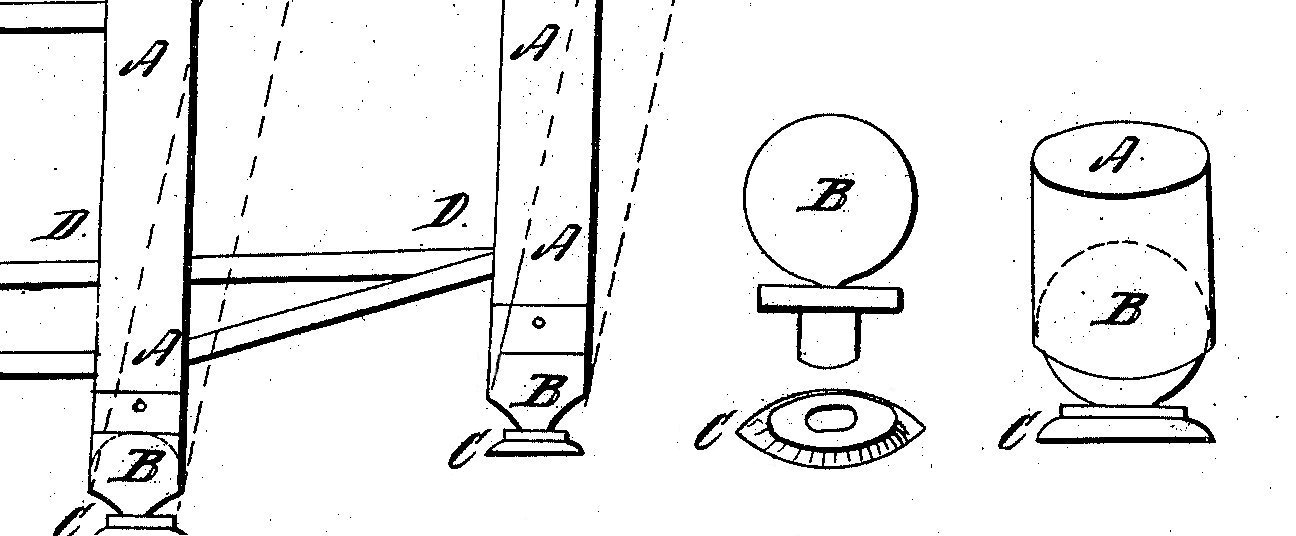
Patent 8771 image close-up of parts

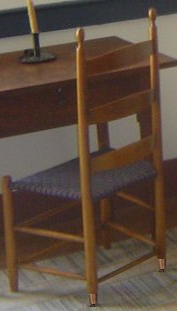
Shaker ladder chair with ball swivels on rear legs for tilting

The Shaker tilting chair – named for its ball bearing or ball and socket (Note: See also ball joint and Spherical bearing.) button mechanism assembled to the back two legs of a wooden chair – allowed a person to lean back in the chair without slipping or scraping the floor. (Note: "Near the middle of the century the Shakers invented their tilting-chair device, which was inserted under the tips of the back legs to prevent slipping or marring of floors when the chair was tilted back against a wall".)

== Description ==
The device was a new practical way of being able to lean back without slipping while sitting in a common Shaker ladder-back wooden chair. It prevented damage to carpets and scraping the floors usually caused by the back legs of chairs when they slipped.

The main feature of the Shaker ladder-back chair was a tilting ball and socket joint mechanism installed on the bottom of the two rear legs to keep the leg bottoms level. Normally the inflection of the chair feet edges into wooden floors would cause deep scratches and into carpets would cause puncture tear holes. The ball joint mechanism idea would prevent unnecessary punctures and stress to the chair components because the chair feet were kept level and flat even though the chair was tilted back. Initially the swivel idea was developed using just wooden balls around 1834. It was later realized that this new concept for tilting caused major stress to the chair. More repair engineering work was required than initially foreseen. This was due to the weakening of the leg caused by drilling involved in installation of the wooden ball joint mechanism. Ultimately, the wooden ball concept was discarded and the production of this device ceased.

Brother George O'Donnell of Shaker Village in New Lebanon, New York came up with a strong metal attachment device in 1852. It replaced the wooden ball bearing that was inserted into the wooden legs and secured with a leather strap. The metal ball-bearing mechanism was patented by him. (Note: According to Jerry V. Grant, Director of Collections and Research at "Shaker Museum Mount Lebanon": "The Shakers, while they patented some of their inventions, were prohibited by Church rules from profiting from such patents – that is, they did not sell patent rights for their inventions but rather patented things to protect themselves from having others patent their inventions and turning around and charging them for using their own inventions." The Shakers thus were proactive in preventatives against Patent trolls.) It consisted of brass ferrules and balls. It was a practical strong metal attachment to the back two legs of wooden chairs to allow the sitter to tilt back without gouging the floor. A version of O'Donnell's tilt device is still being used on chairs in the twenty-first century.

The Shakers manufactured the "tilting chair" for sale in the 1870s to people outside their community labeling them with "Shaker's Trade Mark, Mt. Lebanon, N.Y." which was the place of the Shaker Village in the state of New York. The tilting buttons on the two back legs that made it a tilting chair were sometimes referred to as "tilters", "swiveling tilter" or "ball and socket feet" that allowed the flat underside of the foot to stay level when the chair was tilted back. In a catalog of New Lebanon Shaker chairs for sale it was an additional price of twenty five cents for button joint tilts to be added to a chair. It was noted by historian Kassay that the general philosophy of a diner "tilting chair" was out of place in the Shaker community, as Believers were not allowed the luxury of after-meal relaxation time.
