= Orwa Nyrabia =

Syrian-German film producer (born 1977)

- عروة النيربية
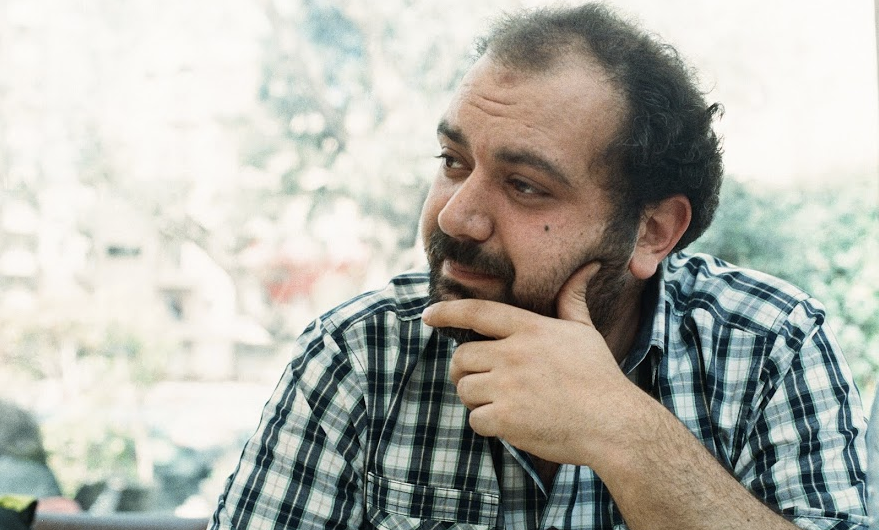
- Nyrabia in Beirut, 2014
- Born: December 16, 1977 (age 48); Homs, Syria
- Years active: 1998—present
- Spouse: Diana El Jeiroudi
- Awards: The Polk Award (2015); HRW Nestor Almendros Award for Courage in Filmmaking(2014); Katrin Cartlidge Award (2012); European Documentary Award (2012), The PL Foundation's Human Rights Award (2012)

Orwa Nyrabia (Arabic: عروة النيربية; born 16 December 1977) is an independent documentary film festival artistic director, producer, filmmaker, trainer, human rights defender and, together with his partner, filmmaker Diana El Jeiroudi, co-founder of DOX BOX International Documentary Film Festival in Syria. Nyrabia is a resident of Berlin, Germany, since the end of 2013 In 2018, Nyrabia became the artistic director of International Documentary Film Festival Amsterdam (IDFA), and in November 2024 he announced he would be stepping down in July 2025.

== Early life and education ==
Nyrabia grew up in the city of Homs, Syria, in a family of political dissidents. His father, Mouaffaq Nyrabia, is a prominent leftist opposition figure, and a political prisoner in the 1980, and his mother, Amal Mohammad, a political activist and the sister of renowned Syrian filmmaker Ossama Mohammad. In 1999 Nyrabia graduated with a degree in acting from the Higher Institute for Dramatic Arts in Damascus, Syria. From 1997 to 2002, Nyrabia wrote regularly for Lebanese daily As-Safir.

== Film career ==
While still a student, Nyrabia worked as assistant director with Ossama Mohammad on his film Sacrifices, which was premiered at the 2002 Cannes Film Festival. In 2004, he played the main role in Yousry Nasrallah's "The Gate of Sun". The film, an adaptation of Elias Khoury's novel with the same name, was screened at the 2004 Cannes Film Festival. Nyrabia also worked on several feature films as a first assistant director. In 2002, Nyrabia and his partner, filmmaker and producer Diana El Jeiroudi, launched their first independent film production company, Proaction Films, in Damascus, to be the first independent company dedicated to documentary films production in the country.

In 2008, Nyrabia and El Jeiroudi launched DOX BOX (Arabic: أيام سينما الواقع) to be the country's first independent film festival, attracting a large audience and hosting prominent international filmmakers. The festival started with screenings in Damascus cinemas but from 2009 on screenings were expanded to other Syrian cities including Homs and Tartus. Along with the annual festival, many workshops and activities were offered to young Syrian filmmakers. His work with DOX BOX earned him and his partner, Diana El Jeiroudi, several awards, including the Katrin Cartlidge Award and the European Documentary Award in 2012.

Among the significant films Nyrabia produced was the 2008 documentary Dolls, A Woman from Damascus, by Diana El Jeiroudi, the film was screened in over 40 countries around the world, on Television, in festivals and Art exhibitions.

In 2013, while residing in Egypt, Nyrabia produced the documentary film Return to Homs, by Syrian filmmaker Talal Derki, and the film became the very first film from the Arab World to open the prestigious IDFA, in November 2013. Return To Homs won many awards, including the Grand Jury Prize of 2014 Sundance Film Festival.

In 2014, he was one of the producers of the highly acclaimed film Silvered Water, Syria Self-Portrait, directed by seasoned Syrian filmmaker Ossama Mohammed in collaboration with Wiam Simav Bedirxan, premiered at the Cannes Film Festival Official Selection, and received highest critical claim by major outlets such as Le Monde and Variety. Nyrabia's success in 2014 was highlighted by CBS's show 60 Minutes on December 15, 2014.

In 2020, he was one of the producers of Gianfranco Rosi’s Notturno, which premiered in competition at the Venice Film Festival, was Italy’s 93rd Academy Awards and was shortlisted for the Best Documentary.

Nyrabia continued to produce El Jeiroudi's films, to great critical acclaim, most notably her 2021 film "Republic of Silence", which premiered at the Venice Film Festival and went to win multiple awards, including at DokLeipzig. "Republic of Silence" was El Jeiroudi's account of her and Nyrabia's life, alongside their closest friends, over a long filming period of 12 years, which included establishing DOX BOX Festival in Syria, the Syrian uprising, Nyrabia's detention, and their exile to Germany. In 2025, the Berlin International Film Festival invited both El Jeiroudi and Nyrabia to present a masterclass around the film and their shared journey.

Nyrabia served on the juries of many international film festivals and funds, including L'Œil d'or at the Cannes Film Festival, the Berlin International Film Festival, IDFA, Prince Claus Fund and Dok Leipzig, among others. He also worked as a documentary film tutor at various prestigious workshops, such as the IDFA Academy and the Encounters documentary workshop in Cape Town, South Africa. In June 2017, Nyrabia, together with his partner Diana El Jeiroudi, were the very first Syrians to be invited as members of the Academy of Motion Picture Arts and Sciences.

Nyrabia is part of various non-profit boards, including the International Documentary Association, DOX BOX Association, The Peabody Awards Board of Jurors, in addition to being the president of The Festival Academy, a Brussels-based non-profit training and connecting young festival managers around the globe, and the chair of the board of the International Coalition for Filmmakers at Risk (ICFR)

== IDFA Artistic Director ==
In 2018, Nyrabia became the Artistic Director of the prominent IDFA, International Documentary Film Festival Amsterdam. During his tenure, the organization navigated the pandemic, committed to, and delivered on a gender parity pledge, and went through an overhaul of its programs, incorporating a wider global representation, and at the same time becoming a key address for US-based studios's promotion calendar.

Nyrabia restructured the festival's programs to become more international and inclusive, in terms of gender, cultural and geographical backgrounds, and in terms of artistic sensibility, IDFA represented a wider spectrum of documentary film and art forms and genres. In 2019 he introduced the non-competitive premier sections Luminous and Frontlight, and in 2021 the major Envision Competition, about which he said " “Films that seem to be a little too classical, although very well made, now have a natural home in the international competition while films that really go an extra mile when experimenting with form, do not seem to be too much when we have the new Envision Competition. We can accommodate a wider range of filmmaking approaches this way.” He also introduced the section "IDFA On Stage" where live documentary cinema and performances with documentary elements were presented. Furthermore, Pathways were introduced in 2019 as a way of helping audiences navigate the festival's program thematically, and in the Industry part of the festival, a new structure was shaped between 2019 and 2022, with major change including the introduction of the Producers' Connection, a platform where producers from around the world present their projects to each other seeking collaboration rather than pitching only to funders.

During his tenure, a new process for selecting films and projects was introduced, to include selectors from around the world. In 2023, IDFA moved to its new premises in Vondelpark, at the historical Vondelpark Pavilion building, which IDFA renamed Het Documentaire Paviljoen, with a new cinema hall, and multiple public-facing spaces.

In November 2024, Nyrabia announced that he will be stepping down at the end of his contract by Summer of 2025. In a statement announcing his upcoming departure, IDFA said "Since taking the job in January 2018, Nyrabia and the team of IDFA revamped the festival’s film and industry programs and launched new platforms and initiatives that have become mainstays of the festival, such as the Envision Competition, IDFA On Stage, and the Producers Connection. Also, during this period, the organization achieved gender parity in its various offers. IDFA’s focus on expanding global representation in the sector was a key aspect throughout his tenure, now embedded into all processes, making it a one-of-a-kind gathering where the film community with all its diversity meet up and feel at home. During the past seven years, IDFA successfully navigated a pandemic, adapted and evolved with the shifting social and political realities, and the ever-changing documentary landscape". While the chair of the supervisory board, Lawyer Marry Fortman, said "[Nyrabia's] influence in the artistic field lifted IDFA and has driven the festival as well as the organization to places we never knew they existed."

== Activism ==
Nyrabia's role in the drafting of the Syrian filmmakers' international Call in late April 2011, which is the Syrian uprising's first public statement by a professional group, is known to be central. The call was signed by over 70 Syrian filmmakers, inviting filmmakers around the world to join in demanding democracy for Syria. Stars like Juliette Binoche, Mohsen Makhmalbaf. Mike Leigh were among more than one thousand international film professionals who joined the call.

Nyrabia has been one of the unnamed people behind Syria's most famous grassroots revolutionary organization, Local Coordination Committees in Syria, working on activists’ support and humanitarian aid to displaced citizens. Arabic media praised Nyrabia for his role in humanitarian work, mainly to displaced civilians from Homs. It is known that Nyrabia worked closely with renowned Syrian opposition figures and activists, such as Riad Seif and Razan Zaitouneh. Nyrabia's father, Mouaffaq Nyrabia, is also a known Leftist political dissident, previously detained by the Syrian authorities, and has been the National Coalition for Syrian Revolutionary and Opposition Forces's representative to the EU in the years 2013-2015 and then the coalition's vice president in 2016.

Since Razan Zaitouneh was abducted late 2013 in Douma, near Damascus, by an unknown group of extremists, Nyrabia became the temporary acting director of the organization she founded and directed, Center for Documentation of Violations in Syria (VDC).

=== Detention ===
Nyrabia was reportedly arrested at Damascus International Airport by Syrian authorities on 23 August 2012. His family lost contact with him shortly before he was supposed to board an EgyptAir flight to Cairo. The airline company confirmed that Nyrabia did not board their flight. He was reportedly released on 12 September. Later on, Nyrabia announced on his personal Facebook page that the Syrian Military Intelligence was responsible for his detention. Nyrabia was released following an international filmmakers' campaign for his freedom, in which thousands of film professionals from around the world demanded his freedom in the media. These included Robert De Niro, Robert Redford, Charlotte Rampling, Kevin Spacey, Juliette Binoche and many others. The campaign was a rare example of successful pressure on the Syrian government, as it was the reason why he was released without charges. Following his release, Nyrabia published a letter of thanks to everybody who participated in the campaign

Inspired by the campaign to free him, Nyrabia lobbied for the establishing of the International Coalition for Filmmakers at Risk (ICFR), which was finally announced at the Venice Film Festival in 2020, as a non-profit organization advocating for the safety of filmmakers facing persecution. He seves as the chair of the board of ICFR since it was established.

=== IDFA 2023 Disruption ===
At the opening ceremony of the International Documentary Film Festival Amsterdam (IDFA) in 2023 held on November 8 in the shadow of the Gaza war, three activists burst onto the stage and waved a sign bearing the inscription "From the river to the sea, Palestine will be free", a slogan used by Palestinian activists that is seen by some as a call for the extinction of the state of Israel. The activists received applause, also from Nyrabia himself. On November 10, the members of Israel’s film community issued a statement: "...we are reaching out to express our uttermost dismay, disappointment and concern by the event that occurred during the opening ceremony of IDFA on November 8th. Allowing and applauding a sign which states that “From River to the Sea Palestine will be Free” is a call for the eradication of Israel, the Jewish homeland and of Jews in general. Applauding and cheering the protesters on, was the festival’s director, Mr. Orwa Nyrabia, which allows us to believe that this is IDFA‘s official and reprehensible stance towards Israel and towards Jews..." The following day, The festival made a statement distancing itself from the slogan, in which Nyrabia stated that he did not read the banner during the event, and rather applauded freedom of expression, in addition to second statement demanding a ceasfire and the entry of humanitarian aid to Gaza. The position against the statement, which has been deemed to be "protected speech" by the Dutch supreme court earlier in the year, was understood by a number of artists as an act of silencing Palestinian voices and those in solidarity with them. More than 20 participating filmmakers and artists published, and read during the festival, statements defending the use of "From the River to the Sea" as their support for freedom and democracy for all the land's inhabitants, referring to a one state solution for the historical conflict, and accusing IDFA of censorship. Two days after the aforementioned statements, the festival issued a third, where it recognized that it had no right to suggest that the slogan should not be used, and acknowledged that Israeli occupation of Palestinian land is the "core of the problem". In 2024, Nyrabia said that "the festival was “very narrow-minded” in the way it initially responded to the slogan", and "“We can only claim that we are an open platform when we do not censor voices,” he said. “When they think we are censoring voices, that is on us. This endangers the core of who we are. We are an open platform for free speech. We cannot at the same time be censoring voices, especially at times of massive pain such as the ongoing mass slaughter in Gaza.”, and later the same year, he hosted an international symposium to debate the responsibilities of art organisations during such tremulous times.
