= Al Thaman =

Syrian television series

- Also known as: الثمن; The Price
- Genre: Drama
- Based on: Binbir Gece
- Written by: Daniel Habib
- Story by: Ethem Yekta; Mehmet Bilal; Murat Lütfü; Yildiz Tunç
- Directed by: Fikret Kadioglu; Serdal Genç
- Starring: Bassel Khaiat; Razane Jammal; Nicolas Mouawad; Sara Abi Kanaan
- Theme music composer: Mehmet Cem Tuncer
- Country of origin: Lebanon
- Original language: Arabic
- No. of seasons: 1
- No. of episodes: 89

Production
- Producers: Berrin Dagçinar; Irmak Yazim
- Cinematography: Olcay Bulut
- Editors: Ali Kadı; Ismail Seçkin
- Camera setup: Multi-camera
- Running time: 40–50 minutes
- Production company: O3 Medya

Original release
- Network: MBC 1
- Release: 8 January – 20 June 2023

Al Thaman is a Lebanese television drama series aired from 8 January 2023 to 20 June 2023 on MBC 1. Produced under the banner O3 Medya, it is the official Arabic remake of Turkish series Binbir Gece. It stars Bassel Khaiat, Razane Jammal, Nicolas Mouawad and Sara Abi Kanaan.

== Plot ==
The story follows Sarah, an engineer, who has to navigate her son's cancer diagnosis and the advances of her boss.

== Cast ==
- Bassel Khaiat
- Razane Jammal
- Nicolas Mouawad
- Sabah Al Jazairi
- Sara Abi Kanaan
- Rafic Ali Ahmad
- Ali Younes
- Randa Kaady
- Wissam Fares
- Ahmad Harhash

== Production ==
The series was announced for MBC 1. The principal photography of the series commenced in 2022 and shot in Turkey. A kiss scene in the 27th episode between Nicolas Mouawad and Sara Abi Kanaan sparked controversy.

== Soundtrack ==
The title track has been sung by Elissa.

Al Thaman

Soundtrack album by Elissa
- Released: 2023
- Genre: Soundtrack
- Length: 3:24
- Language: Arabic
- Label: Platinum Records

Music video
- "Al Thaman Title Song: Elissa - Ma Tendam 3a Shi" on YouTube

Tracklisting
| No. | Title | Singer(s) | Length |
|---|---|---|---|
| 1. | "Ma Tendam 3a Shi" | Elissa | 3:24 |
| Total length: | | | 3:24 |
