= Hearts and Minds (1995 TV series) =

British television series

- Genre: Drama
- Created by: Jimmy McGovern
- Written by: Jimmy McGovern
- Directed by: Stephen Whittaker
- Starring: Lynda Steadman; Christopher Eccleston; David Harewood
- Country of origin: United Kingdom
- Original language: English
- No. of series: 1
- No. of episodes: 4

Production
- Producers: Tara Prem; Ian Scaife
- Cinematography: Graham Frake
- Editor: Max Lemon
- Running time: 63 minutes
- Production companies: Alomo Productions; WitzEnd Productions

Original release
- Network: Channel 4
- Release: 16 February – 9 March 1995

Hearts and Minds is a British television series created by Jimmy McGovern and first aired on Channel 4 from 16 February to 9 March 1995. The series won the Royal Television Society award for Best Serial Drama.

The series is about a young teacher at a tough Liverpool high school. After working in a factory, Drew Mackenzie (Christopher Eccleston) manages to educate himself to become a teacher. He wants to share his idealistic approach to rising above his circumstances with his Liverpool students, but soon finds himself caught in the crossfire of racial tensions, homophobia, and the difficult home lives of the teenagers.

According to series creator Jimmy McGovern, the series was based in part on the three years he spent as an English teacher at the Quarry Bank school in Liverpool. The series was well reviewed by British critics, who praised its realism as compared to other well known school dramas.

== Cast ==
- Lynda Steadman as Emma Mackenzie
- Christopher Eccleston as Drew Mackenzie
- David Harewood as Trevor
- Ian McElhinney as Alex
- Sara Mair-Thomas as Mo
- Peter Halliday as Shotton
- Pauline Black as Joanna
- Jonathan Dow as Maurice
- Peter Armitage as Norman
- Mark Womack as Archie
- Ann Joseph as Maggie
- Trina Ali as Sahira
- Paul Fox as Tony
- John Brady as kid
