= Karess Bashar =

Syrian film and TV actress

Karess Bashar كاريس بشار
- Born: February 16, 1976 (age 50); Damascus, Syria
- Occupation: Actress
- Years active: 1992–present
- Spouse: Shady Jawad (div. 2014)
- Children: 1

Karess Bashar (Arabic: كاريس بشار; born 16 February 1976 in Damascus) is a Syrian film and TV actress. She has played many roles on Syrian soap operas. Her only feature film is Usama Muhammad's The Box of Life.

== Career ==
Bashar specialized in media and joined the Zanobia Folk Arts troupe for three years. She was chosen by actor Duraid Lahham to participate in his plays "The Rain Maker" and "The Happy Sparrow". She entered the world of television by filming series such as "Day by Day", "A Family of Six Stars", and "Al Ababid". She succeeded in delivering comedic performances despite being in her early days. She was chosen as a goodwill ambassador for the United Nations' UNICEF organization."

== Awards ==
- Murex d'Or: 2023
- Joy Awards: 2026
