= Michelle Cartlidge =

English writer and illustrator

- Born: Hampstead, London, England
- Education: Hornsey College of Art, Royal College of Art
- Occupations: Writer and Illustrator
- Writing career
- Genre: Children's literature
- Notable works: Pippin and Pod, Teddy Trucks
- Notable awards: Mother Goose Award
- Website: www.michellecartlidge.com

Michelle Cartlidge is an English writer and illustrator.

== Early life and studies ==
Cartlidge was born in Hampstead, London to a British father and a German Jewish refugee mother. Her sister Katrin Cartlidge was an English actress who died in 2002.

She trained in ceramics at Hornsey College of Art and the Royal College of Art. After leaving the Royal College of Art, Michelle decided to concentrate on drawing and started developing ideas for children's books.

== Career ==
She won the Mother Goose Award for the most exciting newcomer to British Children's Books in 1979, for her first book Pippin and Pod. Since then she has had over a hundred books published worldwide in over ten languages, and her Teddy Trucks books have been made into a popular animated cartoon series for Children's BBC. Her work is also included on the Signed Stories web site where books are performed in sign language for hearing-impaired children. Best sellers include Mouse Ballet and The Cornish Cats Who Went To Sea.

Apart from the books that Michelle writes and illustrates herself, she has illustrated two collections of poetry for young children with Brian Patten. She has also designed a twenty-nine-piece bone china gift range for Wedgwood, and greetings cards, tins and wrapping paper.

== Personal life ==
Cartlidge lives in Cornwall, in the fishing village of Mousehole.

She is a patron of the Katrin Cartlidge Foundation.
