= Wiam Simav Bedirxan =

Syrian Kurdish film director

Wiam Simav Bedirxan is a Syrian Kurdish documentary filmmaker from Homs, who co-directed the 2014 film Silvered Water, Syria Self-Portrait with exiled filmmaker Usama Muhammad. Bedirxan documented the Siege of Homs and sent its footage via the internet to Muhammad in Paris in order to make Silvered Water, Syria Self-Portrait, which had its world premiere at the 2014 Cannes Film Festival.

== Life ==
Wiam Simav Bedirxan was born in Saudi Arabia, where her mother was a teacher for five years. The family returned to Syria in the 1980s and proceeded to settle in Homs in 1997. She attended university in Aleppo after which she became an elementary school teacher in Homs and began to film what happens in Homs. She fled Syria through Istanbul and from there to Paris to work on the film Silvered Water, Syria Self Portrait with Usama Muhammad and attend the film's world premiere in Cannes.
