= Diana El Jeiroudi =

Syrian-German independent filmmaker

- ديانا الجيرودي
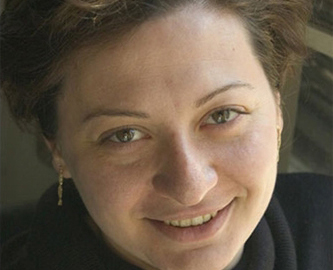
- Born: Damascus, Syria
- Years active: 2002—present
- Spouse: Orwa Nyrabia
- Awards: Katrin Cartlidge Award (2012); European Documentary Award (2012); Dok Leipzig International Competition Honorable Mention (2021); Goethe Institute Best German Documentary Film Prize (2021)

Diana El Jeiroudi (a.k.a. Diana Aljeiroudi), (Arabic: ديانا الجيرودي; born 1977) is a Berlin-based, Syrian-German independent film director and producer. El Jeiroudi’s films as director were celebrated at many festivals, including the Venice Film Festival, IDFA, DokLeipzig, Visions du Réel, CPH:DOX... among others. Her producing credits include the Sundance 2023 film 5 Seasons of Revolution, the Cannes Film Festival 2014 selection Silvered Water, the IDFA 2013 selection The Mulberry House, among others. She was the first Syrian to be a juror in Cannes Film Festival in 2014, when she was part of the first Documentary Film Award jury in the festival. Together with her partner Orwa Nyrabia, El Jeiroudi was also the first Syrian known to be invited to become a member of the Academy of Motion Picture Arts and Sciences in 2017. El Jeiroudi was also a co-founder of DOX BOX International Documentary Film Festival in Syria and DOX BOX e.V. non-profit association in Germany.

== Education and personal life ==
El Jeiroudi graduated with a degree of Arts and Humanities from the Damascus University, Syria . From 1998 to 2002, El Jeiroudi worked in Marketing and Advertising, for some highly acclaimed international agencies, before starting up Proaction Film, an independent film production outfit in Damascus, with her partner Orwa Nyrabia. El Jeiroudi also received professional training in film producing and distribution at the INA/Sorbonne in France.

== Film career ==
=== As Filmmaker and Mentor ===
El Jeiroudi’s first film as film director was ‘’The Pot’’ (2005), a short experimental documentary film that premiered in the prestigious Yamagata International Documentary Film Festival in Japan and then, screened in more than 60 countries, and received high critical acclaim.

Her second film was entitled ‘’Dolls, A Woman from Damascus’’ (2007), was premiered in IDFA's mid-length film competition and screened in Visions du Réel, Montpellier Cinemed Festival, Copenhagen International Documentary Festival and others in more than 40 countries worldwide.

In 2017 it was made public that she made a third film, co-directed with her long-term collaborator, Syrian photographer and activist Guevara Namer, in 2012. The short film, entitled ‘’Morning Fears, Night Chants’’ was premiered in IDFA in 2012 with a crew list made entirely of alias names, and told the story of a young Syrian female singer-songwriter living under danger of prosecution in Damascus.

Her 2021 three-hours long documentary film ‘’Republic of Silence’’ was part of the Official Selection of the Venice Film Festival and at the International Competition of Dok Leipzig 2021 where it received an Honourable Mention and the Goethe Institute Best German Film Prize. Film critic James Mottram wrote “There are personal films and then there is Republic of Silence”, while Nick Cunningham wrote “there is something masterly about Diana El Jeiroudi’s Republic of Silence, whether regarded as a paean to love and unity, or a chronicle of the Syrian conflict as experienced both from within and from without – as an exile living in Europe. It is a film that registers the passing of time among friends and family (and within a working and personal partnership), in which the camera reveals, observes, records and intrudes in equal measure, all the time infusing the senses with a seriousness born of purpose and an accompanying measure of melancholy. It is part odyssey and part cinematic stream of consciousness, but presented with both control and an abundance of tenderness.” Swiss festival director and film critic Jean Perret wrote about El Jeiroudi's Republic of Silence as a film that "opens a rare path in contemporary cinematic art" and considered it "a song of political and poetic resistance with dissonant melodies. A song of hope through images that are disjointed and reunited in a fascinating cinematic gesture”. While film critic Silvia Hallensleben wrote in the German magazine epd Film that "The filmmaker's great art is in the cinematic fusion of diverse elements together without taking away their stubbornness, leaving the result open in many directions" and gave the film a 5 stars rating. In Italy, critic Emanuele Di Nicola wrote that This film is "literally worth a life, or rather several lives", and he added “In Republic of Silence the regime has already lost, defeated by an eye that continues to roll."

In addition to theatrical distribution and TV broadcasting, El Jeiroudi's films were often shown in art events and venues, including Kunsthalle Wien, Berlin State Museums, Institut Valencià d'Art Modern, Asian Art Biennial in Taiwan, among others.

El Jeiroudi is also frequently working as mentor for other filmmakers, notably as lead mentor for workshops such as ExOriente, The Circle Doc Accelator for Women and Gender-expansive filmmakers, Berlinale Talents Docs by the Sea in Indonesia, and as visiting professor at the renowned Escuela Internacional de Cine y Televisión in Cuba

=== As Producer and festival organizer ===
As producer of documentary film, El Jeiroudi worked on various successful projects, including Lina’s 5 Seasons of Revolution, which premiered as part of the world cinema documentary competition of the 2023 Sundance Film Festival, Silvered Water, Syria Self-Portrait, which premiered in 2014 Cannes Film Festival, and awarded a Grierson Awards in the BFI London Film Festival 2014, and The Mulberry House, by Scottish-Yemeni Oscar-nominated filmmaker Sara Ishaq, premiered in IDFA 2013 then released theatrically in Austria and Spain. El Jeiroudi was also one of the producers of the 2014 Sundance Film Festival Grand Jury Prize Winner documentary The Return to Homs. In 2023, El Jeiroudi’s production of Lina’s 5 Seasons of Revolution was premiered at Sundance Film Festival and was picked by Anonymous Content for North American markets. The film, Executive Produced by Laura Poitras, was one of the early examples of using Artificial Intelligence to obscure the identity of some of its characters for security reasons

In her other capacity, as a documentary film promoter and trainer, El Jeiroudi headed DOX BOX's professional activities side, through which she managed to make the festival the region's most remarkable documentary film platform. She and her partner Orwa Nyrabia, launched DOX BOX in early 2008. The international documentary film festival grew quickly into the most important documentary film gathering in the Arab World. The festival started with screenings in Damascus cinemas but from 2009 on screenings were expanded to other Syrian cities including Homs and Tartus. Along with the annual festival, many workshops and activities were offered to young Syrian filmmakers. The fifth edition of the festival, planned for March 2012, was cancelled in protest of the Syrian government's crackdown on protesters during the ongoing Syrian uprising. Instead, El Jeiroudi advocated for Syrian documentary films to be shown in festivals around the world in what was termed the "Dox Box Global Day." The aim, according to the DOX BOX website, was to show "how poverty, oppression and isolation do not prevent humans from being spectacularly brave, stubborn and dignified." Her work with DOX BOX earned her and her partner, Orwa Nyrabia, several awards including the Katrin Cartlidge Award and the European Documentary Network's Award in 2012.

In 2014, after moving to Berlin, El Jeiroudi announced the creation of DOX BOX e.V., a non-profit association aimed at the support, promotion and education of a new generation of documentary makers in the Arab World, El Jeiroudi's work in Berlin included the creation of the first Arab-European Documentary Convention and an extensive research project that aims at mapping the documentary industry in the Arab region. In addition to being a co-founder and general manager of the association, El Jeiroudi continued to direct and produce films herself.

In 2015, El Jeiroudi was one of the jury members for the first-ever documentary film award "L'Œil d'or" or "The Golden Eye" in 2015 Cannes Film Festival, she served on juries of various festivals, including IDFA, DokFest Munich, One World Film Festival in Prague ... among others. El Jeiroudi is a member of the Deutsche Filmakademie.
