= Silvered Water, Syria Self-Portrait =

- Directed by: Ossama Mohammed; Wiam Simav Bedirxan
- Written by: Wiam Simav Bedirxan; Ossama Mohammed
- Produced by: Orwa Nyrabia; Serge Lalou; Camille Laemlé; Diana El Jeiroudi
- Cinematography: Wiam Simav Bedirxan
- Edited by: Maisoun Asaad
- Music by: Noma Omran
- Production companies: Les Films d'ici Proaction Film
- Release date: 16 May 2014 (Cannes)
- Running time: 92 minutes
- Country: Syria
- Language: Arabic

Silvered Water, Syria Self-Portrait (Arabic: ماء الفضة, French: Eau argentée, Syrie autoportrait) is a Syrian documentary film about the Syrian Civil War, directed by Ossama Mohammed and Wiam Simav Bedirxan. The film premiered in the Special Screenings section of the 2014 Cannes Film Festival.

Shot by a reported “1,001 Syrians,” according to the filmmakers, Silvered Water, Syria Self-Portrait impressionistically documents the destruction and atrocities of the civil war through a combination of eye-witness accounts shot on mobile phones and posted to the internet, and footage shot by Bedirxan during the siege of Homs. Bedirxan, an elementary school teacher in Homs, had contacted Mohammed online to ask him what he would film, if he was there. Mohammed, working in forced exile in Paris, is tormented by feelings of cowardice as he witnesses the horrors from afar, and the self-reflexive film also chronicles how he is haunted in this dreams by a Syrian boy once shot to death for snatching his camera on the street.

The documentary includes some scenes of atrocities that Mohammed believes could only have been filmed by members of the Syrian government security forces. Mohammed and Bedirxan only met in person for the first time when she was able to escape Homs and attend the world premiere in France.
