= Rides (British TV series) =

- Genre: Drama
- Written by: Carole Hayman
- Starring: Jill Baker; Louise Jameson; Caroline Blakiston; Katharine Schlesinger; Lynda Steadman; Lucy Speed
- Country of origin: United Kingdom
- Original language: English
- No. of series: 2
- No. of episodes: 12

Production
- Producer: Lavinia Warner
- Production company: Warner Sisters

Original release
- Network: BBC One
- Release: 18 February 1992 – 18 June 1993

Rides is a British television series produced by the BBC between 1992 and 1993. It lasted two series of six episodes each and was made by Warner Sisters, a UK-based television production company based in Ealing. The series revolved around an all-female taxi firm.

The series starred Jill Baker as Patrice Jenner, a former Royal Corps of Transport warrant officer who starts up an all-women taxi firm. The first series dealt with the establishment of the business and the recruitment of a team of drivers - Scarlett (Caroline Blakiston), Janet (Louise Jameson), Sue-Lyn (Katharine Schlesinger), Aileen (Lynda Steadman), Aggie (Nimmy March) and George (Nicola Cowper). The second series explored more personal storylines involving the women, such as Patrice's relationship with her teenage daughter Beki (Lucy Speed). The first series also starred Jesse Birdsall as Julian, Patrice's love interest, however in series two Julian was played by a different actor, James Purefoy.

George was a motorbike-riding, leather-clad lesbian who was dating Sacha, played by Charlotte Avery. They lived in a squat and befriended Patrice's daughter Beki - causing much concern to Patrice. George, Frankie and Sacha were the motorcyclists who made up the 'dispatch' part of the firm. Scarlett (Caroline Blakiston) was a transgender woman.
