= The Gate of Sun =

2004 film

- Directed by: Yousry Nasrallah
- Written by: Yousry Nasrallah; Elias Khoury; Muhammad Suwaid
- Produced by: Humbert Balsan
- Starring: Hiam Abbass; Orwa Nyrabia
- Cinematography: Samir Bahzan
- Edited by: Luc Barnier
- Release date: 18 May 2004
- Running time: 278 minutes
- Countries: Egypt; France
- Language: Arabic

The Gate of Sun (Arabic: باب الشمس, translit. Bab el shams, French: La Porte du soleil) is a 2004 French-Egyptian war film directed by Yousry Nasrallah and based on the novel by Elias Khoury. It was screened out of competition at the 2004 Cannes Film Festival.

== Plot ==
The film spans 50 years of the Israeli–Palestinian conflict with a central group of Palestinian refugees who were expelled from the Galilee in 1948.

== Cast ==
- Hiam Abbass - Um Youness
- Fady Abou-Samra - Dr. Amgad
- Hussein Abou Seada - Colonel Mehdi
- Mohamed Akil - Responsible OLP
- Ahmad Al Ahmad - Adnan
- Vivianne Antonios - Epouse de Sameh
- Muhtaseb Aref - Sheikh Ibrahim
- Gérard Avedissian - Barman
- Antoine Balabane - Georges
- Béatrice Dalle - Catherine
- Darina El Joundi - Femme fantôme
- Maher Essam - Selim
- Hanane Hajj Ali - Zeinab
- Mohamed Hedaki - Abou Essaf
- Talal Jordy - Tortionnaire
- Bassel Khayyat - Khaleel
- Ragaa Kotrosh - Om Soliman
- Kassem Melho - Ostaz Youssef
- Orwa Nyrabia - Youness
- Hala Omran - Shams
- Nadira Omran - Um Hasan
- Bassem Samra - Interrogateur
- Wissam Smayra - Himself
- Rim Turkhi - Nahila
