= Talal Derki =

Syrian Kurdish filmmaker (born 1977)

- طلال ديركي
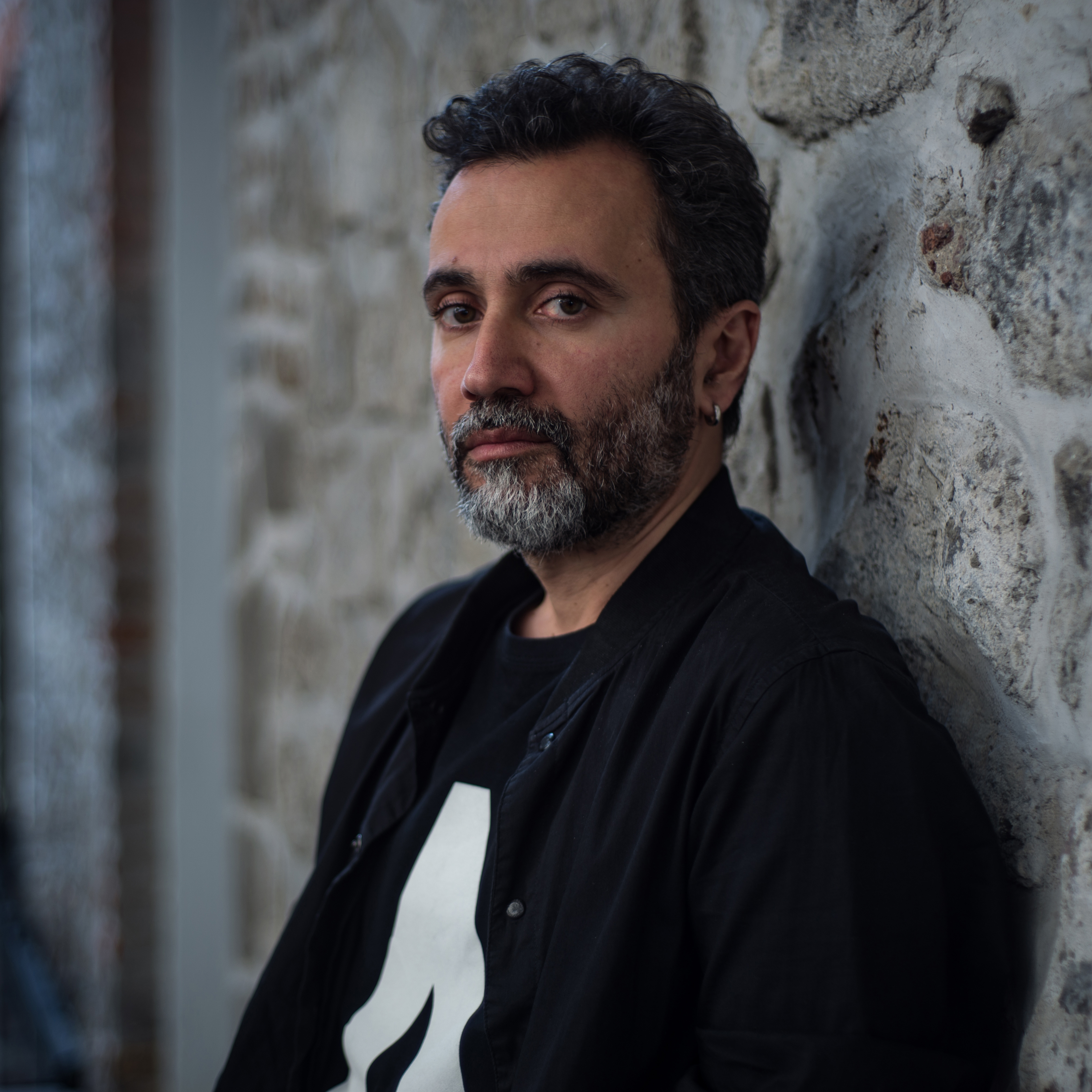
- Talal Derki in Mexico (2018)
- Born: Talal Derki; July 24, 1977 (age 49); Damascus, Syria.
- Education: Stavrakos High Institute of Cinematographic Art and Television Television
- Occupations: Film director; producer
- Years active: 2003–present

Talal Derki (Arabic: طلال ديركي Ṭālāl Dīrkī) is a Syrian Kurdish filmmaker best known for his award-winning documentaries The Return to Homs (2013) and Of Fathers and Sons (2017).

== Biography ==
Born in Damascus, Derki studied film directing in Athens at Stavrakos High Institute of Cinematographic Art and Television, graduating in 2003. He worked as an assistant director for feature film productions and was a director for various Arab TV programs & TV films between 2009 and 2012. He also did freelance camera work for CNN and Thomson Reuters. He was nominated for Academy Award for Best Documentary Feature Film in 2018 and subsequently became a member of the Academy. He is the winner of the German Film Awards, Lola, in 2019. Talal Derki's short films and feature-length documentaries received tens of awards at various festivals. Both of his films Return to Homs and Of Fathers and Sons won the Grand Jury Prize at Sundance Film Festival 2014 and 2018.

== Filmography ==
- 2003 - Hello Damascus, goodbye Damascus, short fiction, 16mm (12min)
- 2005 - A whole line of trees, short fiction, 35 mm (8min)
- 2010 - Hero of All Seas, documentary (28min)
- 2013 - Return to Homs, documentary (90min)
- 2017 - Of Fathers and Sons, documentary (1h 39min)
- 2018 - People of the Wasteland, short experimental, producer (21min)
- 2023 - Under the Sky of Damascus, documentary (88min)

== Awards & Nominations `Return To Homs´ ==
Year	Award	Category	Recipient	Result
2013	International Documentary Film Festival (Amsterdam, Netherlands)	Award for Best Feature-Length Documentary	Talal Derki	Nominated
2014	Festival Dokumentarnega Filma (Ljubljana, Slowenia)	Amnesty International Award for Best Film on Human Rights	Talal Derki	Won
2014	Sundance Film Festival	World Cinema Grand Jury Prize: Documentary	Talal Derki	Won
2014	San Francisco International Film Festival (San Francisco, USA)	Golden Gate Award - Best Documentary Feature	Talal Derki	Nominated
2014	San Francisco International Film Festival (San Francisco, USA)	Golden Gate Award - Special Jury Recognition	Talal Derki	Won
2014	Middle East Now (Florence, Italia)	Audience Award	Talal Derki	Won
2014	Full Frame Documentary Film Festival (Durham, North Carolina)	The Charles E. Guggenheim Emerging Artist Award	Talal Derki	Won
2014	ZAGREBDOX	Two special mentions	Talal Derki	Won
2014	Festival International du Film des Droits de l´Homme (Geneva, Switzerland)	Grand Prix de Jury	Talal Derki	Won
2014	Festival International du Film des Droits de l´Homme (Paris, France)	Grand Prix Jury Award, Student Jury Award	Talal Derki	Won
2014	Doxa (Vancouver, Canada)	Honorable Mention of the Jury	Talal Derki	Won
2014	DocsBarcelona (Barcelona, Spain)	Award DocsBarcelone Best Film	Talal Derki	Won
2014	Human Rights Watch Film Festival NY (New York, USA)	Silver Horn for Director of Best Feature-Length Documentary	Talal Derki	Won
2014	Documenta Madrid Film Festival (Madrid, Spain)	Audience Award	Talal Derki	Won
2014	Festival MakeDox	Winner Young Onion Award	Talal Derki	Won
2014	EBS International Documentary Film Festival (Seoul, South Korea)	Grand Prix, Jury Award	Talal Derki	Won
2014	Du festival des libertés (Brussel, Belgium)	Grand prix for best documentary, Prix SmatBe Award	Talal Derki	Won
2014	Cinema Eye Honors Awards	Nominated for Outstanding Achievement in Production AND Outstanding Achievement in a Debut Feature Film	Talal Derki	Won
2014	ABU DHABI FILM FESTIVAL (UAE)	Special Mention Documentary Competition	Talal Derki	Won
2014	Kraków Film Festival	Cracow Students Jury Award - Documentary Competition	Talal Derki	Won
2014	Kraków Film Festival	Silver Horn Best Feature-Length Documentary	Talal Derki	Won
2015	The George Polk Awards (USA)	Best Documentary	Talal Derki	Won
2015	Roma Independent Film Festival (Italy)	Special mention Documentary Competition	Talal Derki	Won
