= Bassel Khaiat =

Syrian actor (born 1977)

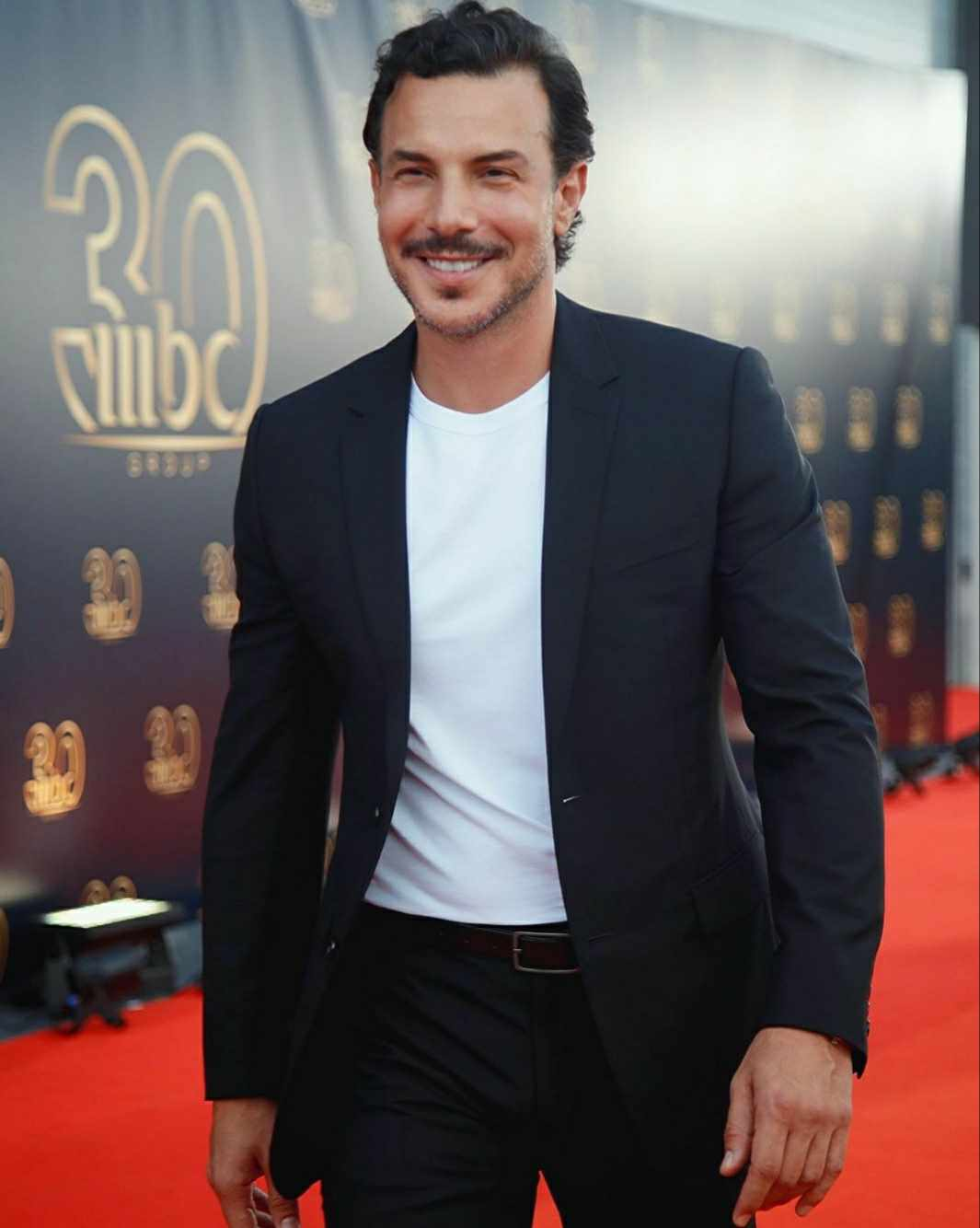
- Born: August 29, 1977 (age 49); Damascus, Syria
- Occupation: Actor
- Years active: 1998-present
- Notable work: Al-Taghreba al-Falasteny
- Height: 1.85 m (6 ft 1 in)
- Spouse: Nahed Zaidan
- Children: 2

Bassel Khaiat (Arabic: باسل خياط, born 29 August 1977) is a Syrian actor, working in theatre, television, and film.

== Early life ==
Khaiat was born in Damascus, Syria, and has a brother named Mohammed. Khaiat started acting at eight years old. He applied for admission at the Higher Institute of Dramatic Arts, but was rejected. He reapplied the following year, was accepted, and graduated in 1999, the same year as Kosai Khauli and Sulafa Memar.

He was an athletic child and grew up in a supportive environment for the arts. His father was a big fan of the movies and his mother came from a musical family.

Khaiat had a difficult upbringing, forcing him to work from a young age. He has described the death of his father as one of the most difficult experiences he has had to endure.

== Career ==
Khaiat has acted in France, Egypt, Lebanon, Jordan, Kuwait and Syria. He is part of a group of Syrian actors who dominate Arab television series, along with Khauli, Taim Hasan, and Maxim Khalil, forming a regional rat pack.

Khaiat's entry into television was a Syrian television show in 1992, Once Upon a Time. In 2000, his portrayal of Amer in the show Secrets of the City, by Hisham Sharbatji, won over audiences. He received critical acclaim in 2004 for his role in the series Big Dreams, by Hatem Ali, followed by successful television series, such as prominent Syrian shows Spring of Cordoba, On the Brink, Abu Khalil Al-Qabbani, and Women's Love.

In 2004, he was featured in the movie The Gate of Sun, which was shown at the Cannes Film Festival.

He broke into Egyptian television through his series Niran Siddiq, broadcast during Ramadan, in which he portrayed Gaddaf. He attracted Egyptian audiences and directors through his portrayal of psychologically complex roles in other Ramadan series My Way alongside the famous Egyptian singer Sherine, who is he a fan of, Al-Mezan, 30 Days, and The Journey.

In 2015, alongside Kosai Khauli, Carmen Lebbos and Ghada Abdel Razek, Basssel was one of the judges in Arab Casting, a television show that aimed to explore the acting talent of the Arab audience. The show was aimed to talents of ages between 16 – 60. The show success among Arab audience led to another season in the following year.

In 2018, he was featured in Tango, broadcast internationally on Netflix. The same year, he won a Distinctive International Arab Festivals Award for his work.

In 2019, he served as a judge for the Sharjah International Film Festival for Children.

In 2021, as part of MBC's 30th anniversary celebration, Khaiat and other superstars from the Arab world such as Yousra, Nasser Al Qasabi, Amina Khalil, Dhaffer L'Abidine, Asser Yassin, and Somaya El Khashab, appeared in a four-segment episode of Who Wants to Be a Millionaire. He was profiled in GQ magazine by Nasri Atallah in 2021.

In 2023, he was announced as the first male ambassador for the Middle East for the Italian fashion house Bulgari.

== Personal life ==
Khaiat was engaged for over two years to Tunisian artist Hend Sabry.

In 2020, he, along with many Syrian actors, was embroiled with the Syrian Artists Syndicate, after the president, actor Zuhair Ramadan, made several remarks stating that some actors had called for killing of the Syrian people. Khaiat issued a statement that his dismissal from the Syndicate was because of statements made without evidence, that he would reschedule payments to the Syndicate, and that artists have the right to know what they are paying for and what they will get in return.

He is married to Nahed Zaidan, with whom he has a son, Shams, and a daughter, Isabelle. His favorite actor is Daniel Day-Lewis.

== Selected filmography ==
Year	Name	Translation - Arabic	Genre	Role
2009	The Long Night	-	Mystery	-
2009	Al Dawama	الدوامة	Drama	-
2011	Paper Marker	سوق الورق	Drama	Mokhtar
2011	Al Ghofran	الغفران	Drama	Amjd
2013	We Will Be Right Back	سنعود بعد قليل	Drama	Kareem
2014	Al Sayeda AL Aoula: First Lady	السيدة الأولى	Drama	Omar
2015	Tariqi - My Way	طريقي	Drama, Musical	Yehiya
2015	The Godfather : The Orient Club	العرّاب: نادي الشرق	Crime, Drama	
2016	Al mizan	الميزان	Crime	Khalid Hosney
2016	Al Arrab 2: Taht Al Hezam	العرّاب: تحت الحزام	Action, Drama	Gad
2017	Al Rehla	الرحلة	Crime, Drama	Usamma
2017	Orkadia	أوركيد	Fantasy	Otba the King of Orkadia
2017	Youm	يوم	Crime, Mystery	Tawfeek
2018	Tango	تانغو	Romance	Aamer
2019	The Writer	الكاتب	Crime, Drama, Mystery	Younis Jebran
2020	Blood Oath	عهد الدم	Action, Crime, Thriller	Saleem Fayyad
2021	Harb Ahlya	حرب أهلية	Drama	Yousef
2021	Qaid Majhol	قيد مجهول	Crime, Drama, Mystery	Yazan
2022	Dangerous Curve	منعطف خطر	Crime, Drama, Mystery	Hisham Montaser
2023	Al Thaman	الثمن	Drama, Romance	Zain Alsafi
2024	A look of love	نظرة حب	Drama, Romance	Baher

=== Selected cinema ===
- 2004 – Bab el shams – actor
- 2009 – The Long Night – actor
