= The Return to Homs =

- Promotional poster
- Directed by: Talal Derki
- Written by: Talal Derki
- Produced by: Orwa Nyrabia; Hans Robert Eisenhauer; Diana El Jeiroudi
- Cinematography: Talal Derki; Ossama al Homsi; Kahtan Hassoun; Orwa Nyrabia
- Edited by: Anne Fabini
- Production companies: Proaction Film; Ventana Films
- Distributed by: Journeyman Pictures
- Release dates: December 20, 2013 (IDFA); January 20, 2014 (Sundance Film Festival)
- Running time: 80 minutes
- Countries: Syria; Germany
- Language: Arabic

The Return to Homs (Arabic: العودة إلى حمص; German: Homs - Ein zerstörter Traum, lit. 'Homs: A Shattered Dream') is a 2013 Syrian-German documentary film written and directed by Talal Derki. It is produced by Orwa Nyrabia and Hans Robert Eisenhauer while Diana El Jeiroudi served as the associate producer. The film premiered in-competition at the 2013 International Documentary Film Festival Amsterdam on November 20, 2013, as the opening film of the festival.

The film also premiered in-competition in the World Cinema Documentary Competition at 2014 Sundance Film Festival on January 20, 2014. It won the Grand Jury Prize award at the festival.

After its premiere at the Sundance Film Festival, Journeyman Pictures acquired the worldwide distribution rights of the film. The film's TV rights has been previously sold to ARTE for France and Germany, NHK for Japan, RTS for Switzerland, SVT for Sweden, and Radio Canada.

It also served as the closing film at 2014 Human Rights Film Festival on March 28, 2014.

== Synopsis ==
In the middle of Syrian Civil War, the film follows, 19-year-old national football team goalkeeper, Abdul Baset al-Sarout and 24-year-old Ossama, his media activist and journalist friend, their daily life in the city of Homs which has become a bombed-out ghost town by government forces. Their homes, lives and dreams destroyed and in order to gain freedom, they are forced to change course Baset and Ossama turned from peaceful protesters into rebel insurgents.

== Reception ==
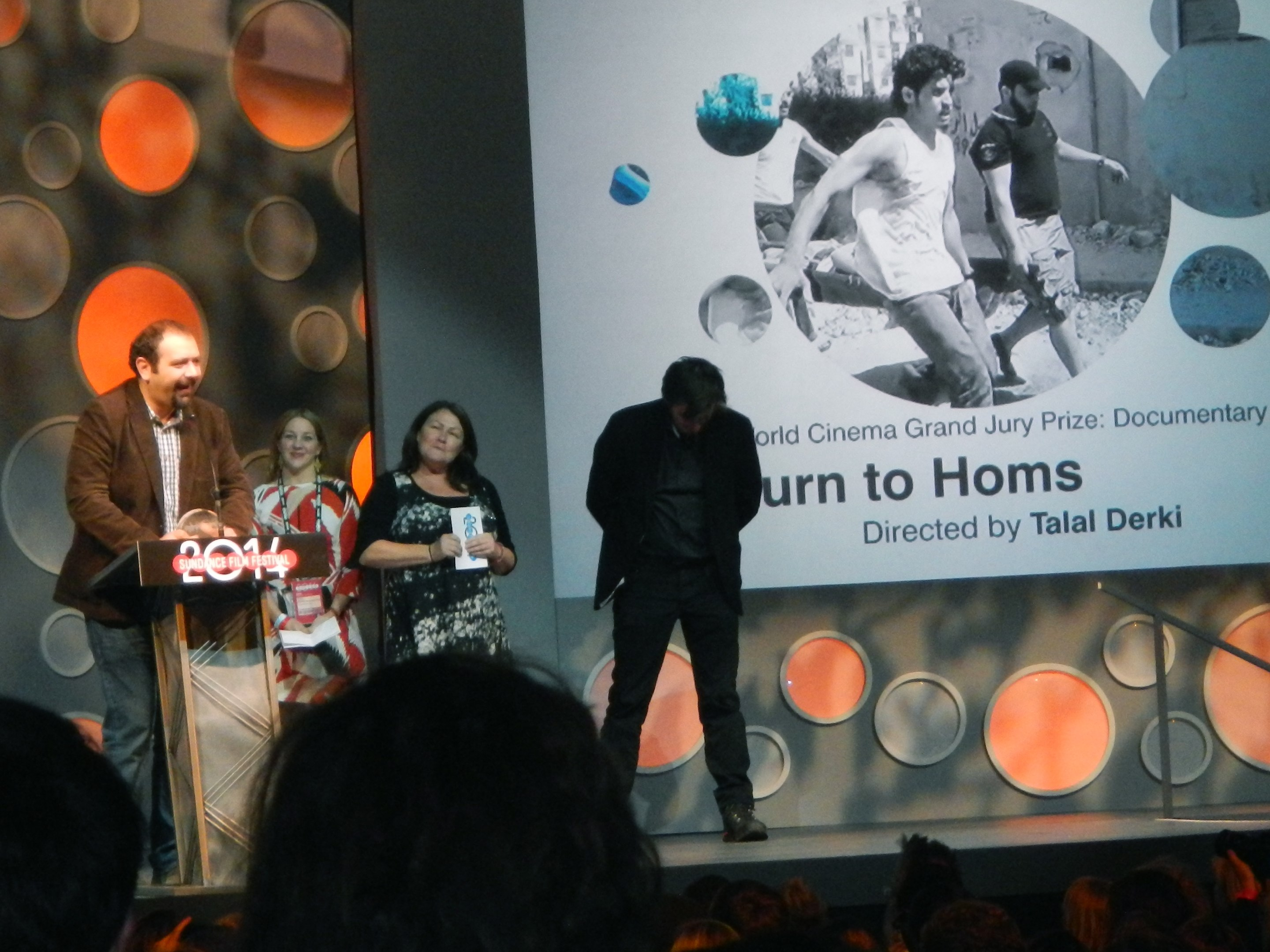
The Return to Homs won the World Cinema Grand Jury Prize: Documentary at the 2014 Sundance Film Festival.

The Return to Homs received mostly positive reviews upon its premiere at the 2014 Sundance Film Festival. Peter Debruge of Variety, said in his review that "Talal Derki’s “Return to Homs” represents a remarkable achievement in immersive conflict-zone filmmaking, fearlessly taking auds to the front lines of the Syrian civil war and embedding them alongside soccer star turned resistance leader Abdul Baset al-Sarout, a charismatic nonviolent protester pushed into taking up arms against the oppressive regime."

Neil Young in his review for The Hollywood Reporter called the film "An unflinching, rousing piece of civil-war reportage, literally dispatched from the conflict's front lines."

Eric Kohn from Indiewire praised the film by saying that ""Return to Homs" reveals a far more frenzied, visceral struggle that a handful of driven warriors continue to endure at all costs. With its climactic freeze frame, Derki captures the men's uneasy combination of desperation and triumph in a single image: With nowhere left to go, they still push ahead."

While, Dan Fienberg of HitFix grade the film B+ and said that "There are shades of Kubrick to the long, uninterrupted shots that take us through bombed out buildings, a labyrinth of ruins that still have poignant ties to our heroes."

== Accolades ==
Year	Award	Category	Recipient	Result
2013	International Documentary Film Festival Amsterdam	Award for Best Feature-Length Documentary	Talal Derki	Nominated
2014	Sundance Film Festival	World Cinema Grand Jury Prize: Documentary	Talal Derki	Won
2014	San Francisco International Film Festival	Golden Gate Award - Best Documentary Feature	Talal Derki	Nominated
2014	San Francisco International Film Festival	Golden Gate Award - Special Jury Recognition	Talal Derki	Won
2014	Kraków Film Festival	Kraków Students Jury Award - Documentary Competition	Talal Derki	Won
2014	Kraków Film Festival	Silver Horn - Best Feature-Length Documentary	Talal Derki	Won

Awards
Preceded by A River Changes Course	Sundance Grand Jury Prize: World Cinema Documentary; 2014	Succeeded by The Russian Woodpecker
