= Teddy Trucks =

British children's cartoon television series

- Genre: Cartoon series
- Created by: Michelle Cartlidge
- Written by: Chris Allen
- Directed by: Derek Mogford
- Voices of: Carole Boyd; Jonathan Kydd
- Theme music composer: Kick Production
- Opening theme: "If you Wanna Get It There, Call the Bear"
- Ending theme: "If you Wanna Get It There, Call the Bear" (Different lyrics)
- Composer: Kick Production
- Country of origin: United Kingdom
- Original language: English
- No. of seasons: 1
- No. of episodes: 13

Production
- Executive producers: Anne Miles; Theresa Plummer-Andrews
- Producers: Jo Pullen; Joan Lofts
- Camera setup: Jim Davey
- Running time: 5 minutes
- Production company: Abbey Broadcast Communications

Original release
- Network: BBC1
- Release: 4 January – 7 April 1994

Teddy Trucks is a British animated TV series based on the best-selling books by award-winning author and illustrator Michelle Cartlidge. The series was developed in conjunction with BBC Children's Television. The show follows a business company of bears who drive trucks and deliver cargo.

== Characters ==
- Boss Bear – The coordinator of the Teddy Trucks company. He wears a checkered shirt, a red necktie and blue jeans.
- Mrs. Boss Bear – Boss' wife, who usually talks to him on the telephone. She wears a blue flowered dress, a pearl necklace and blue flowered hat.
- Dusty – The Boss' secretary who has to constantly remind him to use the other phone. She wears a yellow flowered dress and blue rims.
- Bella – The driver of the first truck. She wears a red head scarf, a pink shirt and red flowered overalls.
- Wilson – The driver of the second truck. He wears a pink shirt with yellow rims and checkered trousers.
- Jacko – The driver of the third truck. He wears a lilac shirt with pink rims and grey trousers.
- Gerry – The driver of the fourth truck. He wears a blue shirt with red rims and a brown striped trousers, and takes his mischievous dog, Nutley, wherever he goes.
- Rosie – The owner of the café, providing for the drivers during their break time. She wears a pink spotted dress and a yellow apron.
- Governor Bear – Boss Bear's father.

== Episodes ==
| No. | Title | Original release date |
|---|---|---|
| 1 | "Gerry's Big Move" | 4 January 1994 |
Bored of his standby position, Gerry takes his own initiative to move Mr. Mold's furniture, but it proves to be fruitless.
| 2 | "Bella's Birthday Party" | 11 January 1994 |
A celebration of Bella's birthday distracts the truck drivers from their duties, but the boss gets them back on track.
| 3 | "Gerry Kicks Off" | 18 January 1994 |
Wilson gets a bucket stuck on his foot. Gerry takes his place in the big football game, but he is not cut out for it.
| 4 | "Gerry's Special Delivery" | 25 January 1994 |
Gerry brings two abandoned giraffes to the depot. Boss makes arrangements with his father Governor Bear to have them relocated.
| 5 | "Nutley's Priceless Bone" | 1 February 1994 |
Teddy Trucks safeguard Lady De Grandley's vase to be sold, Nutley keeping it buried in the ground.
| 6 | "Boss Bears's Boat" | 8 February 1994 |
Gerry undertakes an important job to move Boss' new boat. The boat gets lost, but Nuttley sails to the harbour.
| 7 | "Bella's Great Chance" | 15 February 1994 |
As Teddy Trucks deliver for Maestro Bear, Bella becomes his triangle-playing soloist.
| 8 | "Rosie's Day Out" | 22 February 1994 |
Teddy Trucks and Rosie go on a holiday picnic, but get lost trying to find Boss Bear. However they have a nice campout.
| 9 | "The Great Key Chase" | 1 March 1994 |
Nutley swipes Jacko's keys. Jacko and Gerry have a hard time getting them back and miss out on their important job for Mayor Bear.
| 10 | "Dusty's New Sports Car" | 8 March 1994 |
Dusty's colleagues try to fix her sports car. It turns out there is a birds' nest under the seat, but Dusty reunites the birds with their mother.
| 11 | "Jacko's Unusual Cargo" | 15 March 1994 |
Gerry and Jacko are creeped out by Weirdly Grange and think that the Butler Groan in the wardrobe is a ghost.
| 12 | "Gerry the Star" | 22 March 1994 |
Teddy Trucks go out for the evening to see Ballet Rumbear. Gerry has to make a delivery to that very ballet and becomes a part of it.
| 13 | "Boss Bear's Barbecue" | 29 March 1994 |
Teddy Trucks celebrate their anniversary with a barbecue. Bella and Rosie save the barbecue from going to ruin.

== Broadcasting ==
- The series was first broadcast on the BBC in 1994 as part of their children's programming strand Children's BBC and aired from 4 January to 7 April that year. It was later sold to various global markets and aired on several networks in different countries around the world, including ABC TV in Australia from 15 July 1994 to 12 February 1999, and was later shown on cable television on the Australian Fox Kids network, and on SABC 2 dubbed in Afrikaans (and later with the original English audio) on e.tv in South Africa.
- Teddy Trucks was also broadcast on satellite television on Sky One (with the series being shown on their long running children's wrapper programme The DJ Kat Show which showed many imported cartoons, as well as some UK series such as Fireman Sam, Postman Pat and Count Duckula) and later on TCC.
