= Lynda Steadman =

Northern Irish actress (born 1962)

- Born: 1962 (age 63–64); Belfast, UK
- Occupation: Actress
- Years active: 1988–2003
- Known for: Career Girls (1997); Milk (1998); Rides (1992); Between the Lines (1992); Thief Takers (1995)

Lynda Steadman (born 1962) is a Northern Irish actress, best known for her role as Annie in Mike Leigh's Career Girls (1997), and Andrea Arnold's short film Milk (1998), along with the television series Rides (1992), Between the Lines (1992), and Thief Takers (1995).

== Early life ==
Steadman was born in Belfast, Northern Ireland, in 1962. Her paternal family is of Scottish descent, while her maternal family originated from Newcastle upon Tyne, North East England. She was trained at the Rose Bruford College, in Greater London.

== Career ==
As a member of the Lyric Theatre, Belfast, Steadman performed in various productions, including A Christmas Carol in 1988, The Playboy of the Western World, and After the Fall. In May 1988, she portrayed Jan Blakely in Martin Lynch's comedy Welcome to Bladonmore Road at the Belfast Civic Arts Theatre.

In addition to her traditional stage work, Steadman expanded into writing and directing. She wrote and directed an independent theatrical production titled From Angel to Old Street, a play set between the two eponymous stops on the London Underground's Northern Line. Around the same time, she made an independent film adaptation of Medea.

Her television debut was in the Channel 4 drama Brookside, before becoming popular for her television roles in Children of the North, the BBC series Rides, and Thief Takers during the late 1980s and early 1990s.

Her film debut was in Mike Leigh's Career Girls, playing the co-lead alongside Katrin Cartlidge. Another notable role was the lead in Andrea Arnold's directorial debut short Milk.

== See also ==
- Theatre of the United Kingdom
- Irish theatre
- Television in the United Kingdom
