= Dox Box =

Film festival in Syria

Dox Box (Arabic: دوكس بوكس) and Dox Box Festival (Arabic: أيام سينما الواقع) were established and launched in Syria in 2008 as an annual documentary film festival and suspended in 2012. In 2014, it became ″DOX BOX Association″, a Berlin-registered non-profit.

Dox Box Festival was organised by a Syrian production company, Proaction Film, as a non-profit free-admission event to spread awareness and increase interest in documentaries. In its fourth edition, Dox Box 2011, it reached 28,000 admissions according to the festival's website.

In March 2012, The organizers of Dox Box festival decided to refrain from holding its fifth edition in protest against the killing and oppression of civilians in Syria according to a statement released on the official festival site. On 15 and 16 March 2012, a "Dox Box Global Day" screening was launched and exhibited several Syrian documentary movies in 39 cities across the world.is a nonprofit institution for support and training in documentary film-making. Based in Berlin since 2014, with one foot in Europe and the other in the Arab/African region, it proposes carefully designed programs targeting diversity, skills transfer and alternative visual perspectives. The mission is to support distinct and singular voices from the region to ensure that a vibrant, growing and inclusive space for documentary film-making continues to thrive.

== Programs and Activities ==
=== Residency ===
The editing residency program is one of the oldest forms of support offered by DOX BOX to filmmakers from the Arab/African region. The residency is directed at films at their rough-cut stage or filmmakers who want to take the time to conceptualize their visual material to produce trailers and/or assembly versions of their films. Residents are offered a financial contribution, access to the editing facilities in Berlin, Germany, and emotional and artistic support throughout the residence period

=== DOX Garage ===
DOX Garage (Arabic: دوكس جراج) offers tailor-made advice to filmmakers who are facing a critical moment in the development of their film project. The program offers an extensive toolkit to ensure that film projects survive the many challenges encountered during the filmmaking process and enables participants to creatively think about overcoming the obstacles hindering the advancement of the film project.

The program is designed to provide tailor-made advice or practical reflection to support and facilitate the eventual finalization of projects. Recipients are matched with seasoned professionals for a number of consultancy hours, either online or in person.

Powered by Dox Garage is a physical version of this program that relocates worldwide, bringing the ‘tool kit ‘ to film festivals and conventions. It provides on-spot diagnosis and helps identify the appropriate professionals necessary to assist each project individually.

== Mouatheqat/Women in DOX ==
Mouatheqat/Women in DOX (Arabic: مُوَثِّقات) is a nine-month fellowship program for female professionals to acquire and exchange the necessary skills to write, research, direct, produce and edit a documentary film. Its main focus lies in the exploration of and experimentation with different forms of storytelling emanating from individual perspectives, reflecting the filmmakers own voices and experiences. The first cycle started in 2020 and was open to female fellows from Jordan, Egypt, Tunis, Algeria, Mauritania and Sudan. The second cycle 2022 targeted fellows from Palestine, Lebanon, Morocco and Senegal.

=== Community ===
The community (Arabic: مجتمع دوكس بوكس) is a member-based platform of documentary directors, producers, editors, cinematographers, critics, programmers, sound specialists, commissioning editors, curators, financiers, and more. Members of the community get access to masterclasses and tutorials. In addition, they can watch films on the platform free of charge, feature their own films and get consultancy sessions for their projects when necessary. Other features include using the directory and calendar and building their own professional profile to connect with other members.

=== Doc Convention ===
Documentary Convention is an annual international convention of documentary professionals, artists & decision-makers from the Arab world, Africa, Europe and around the globe. Documentary Convention 2020 has been postponed. New dates have not been announced for next edition.

=== DOC Convention 2018 ===
Modules of the DOC Convention 2018 included Share & Save: The Heritage of Arab Documentary, Ethics of Co-Production, Diversity in Documentary, Distribution in Challenging Times, and Mapping Arab Documentary Landscapes.

=== DOC Convention 2019 ===
The program of the Documentary Convention 2019 was structured around leading themes. These were: Co-Production & Cross-Border Collaboration, Distribution, Circulation & Sales, Data is Beautiful – Data is Ugly, and Continuous Workshop: Restitution: Archive, Agency and Access.

== Festival program 2008-2011 ==
In its 4 editions, 2008–2011, Dox Box showed annually a selection of 40+ international creative-documentary films from around the world, to present the genre to the Syrian audience and at presenting regional documentaries.

Among such screenings included documentary films such as The Beloves by Russian director Viktor Kossakovsky, The Eye Above The Well by Dutch director Johan van der Keuken, The 3 Rooms of Melancholia by Finnish filmmaker Pirjo Honkasalo, a retrospective of France's Nicolas Philibert, old masterpieces like Jean Vigo's À propos de Nice, and recent productions such as The Mother by Switzerland's Antoine Cattin, The One Man Village by Lebanese Simon El Haber, The English Surgeon by Australian Geoffrey Smith, among many others.

Previous festival's guests included Patricio Guzman, D.A. Pennebaker, Chris Hegedus, Pirjo Honkasalo, Nicolas Philibert, Niels Pagh Andersen, Malek Bensmail, and Jehane Noujaim, among others. Among guests were documentary experts and tutors such as Tue Steen Muller, Isabel Arrate, Mikael Opstrup have been attending the festival every year.

The activities of Dox Box usually split into public screenings and professional/capacity-building and networking activities. Screenings are divided into 5 sections, the Official Selection, where films from around the world compete for the Damascus Audience Award (the very first audience award to be introduced in Syria), and two thematic sidebar selections (in 2009 these were: Voices of Women & Notes on War), then a "Meet The Master" section where four films of a master of the documentary art are shown in the presence of the filmmaker, and finally a selection of four films that took the documentary world by storm most recently. Dox Box screenings are with English and Arabic subtitles and of free admission.

== Organizers and sponsors ==
Dox Box operates in close collaboration with the International Documentary Film Festival Amsterdam and the European Documentary Network, in addition to other festivals, such as DocPoint Helsinki and the Copenhagen International Documentary Festival.

Support and grant-making organisations are supporting Dox Box annually, these include The Netherlands' Prince Claus Fund, Denmark's KVINFO, Germany's Goethe Institute and Heinrich Boell Foundation, and the newly established regional fund The Arab Fund for Art and Culture, among others. Dox Box, which is annual and runs in 3 Syrian cities, Damascus, Homs and Tartus, is organized by two Syrian filmmakers, Diana El Jeiroudi and Orwa Nyrabia, among others. Dox Box was also supported by several volunteers who contributed towards writing, editing and translation of articles (English-Arabic).

== Suspension in 2012 ==
Before the time for the 4th edition of Dox Box in March 2012, the organizers made a public statement announcing they will hold back the edition, and all further editions, in protest against the violation of human rights in Syria. In 2012 and 2013, Dox Box Global Day for Syria was the festival's international showcase of Syria documentary films, screened in various venues around the world, and in 2014, the festival became a non-profit association registered in Berlin, Germany, aiming to support and train documentary filmmakers from the Arab/African region.
