= The Box of Life =

2002 film

- Directed by: Usama Muhammad
- Written by: Usama Muhammad
- Produced by: Muhammad al-Ahmad; Xavier Carniaux; Elisabeth Marliangeas
- Starring: Meerna Ghannam
- Cinematography: Elso Roque
- Edited by: Martine Barraqué
- Release date: May 2002
- Running time: 112 minutes
- Countries: Syria; France
- Language: Arabic

The Box of Life (Arabic: صندوق الدنيا, French: Coffre de la vie) is a 2002 Syrian-French drama film directed by Usama Muhammad. It was screened in the Un Certain Regard section at the 2002 Cannes Film Festival.

== Cast ==
- Zuhair Abdulkarim - 3rd Man
- Caresse Bashar - 2nd Woman
- Elias Ghannam - 3rd Boy
- Meerna Ghannam - Fairouza
- Muhammad Hamad - 2nd Boy
- Fares Helou - 2nd Man
- Nihal Khateeb - Kubra
- Bassam Kousa - 1st Man
- Ali Muhammad - Akhdar
- Amal Omran - 1st Woman
- Hala Omran - 3rd Woman
- Maha Saleh - Khadra
- Mustafa Sbeih - 1st Boy
- Rafiq Subaie - Akbar
