= Katrin Cartlidge Foundation =

UK-based foundation

The Katrin Cartlidge Foundation was a charitable foundation established in memory of actress Katrin Cartlidge, who died suddenly and unexpectedly in 2002, at the age of 41. Through the foundation, and as referenced to the Sarajevo Film Festival, support was provided to emerging filmmakers.

== Foundation History ==
The impact of the sudden death of actress Katrin Cartlidge saw the creation of the Katrin Cartlidge Foundation by trustees Mike Leigh, Peter Gevisser, Simon McBurney, Chris Simon and Cat Villiers. Patrons include Lars von Trier and Cartlidge's sister Michelle. Established at the Sarajevo Film Festival, an annual bursary was awarded by "an elected curator, chosen by the (Foundation) Trustees were from a wide and eclectic number of Katrin Cartlidge’s friends and colleagues… (to) a new creative voice… While the new talent nominated each year was a filmmaker, the choices were as varied and extraordinary as Katrin’s own choice of filmmakers and friends from across the arts."

== Patrons ==
- Allison Anders
- Rowan Atkinson
- Jean Marc Barr
- Lilo Baur
- John Berger
- Lex Braes
- Ewen Bremner
- David Byrne
- Barbara Cartlidge
- Michelle Cartlidge
- Carolyn Choa
- Theo Cook
- Clint Dyer
- David Gothard
- Kate Hardie
- Kathryn Hunter
- Lodge Kerrigan
- Beeban Kidron
- Michael Lazo
- Roland Legiarda-Laura
- Alan Linn
- John Lyons
- Annie Nocenti
- Andy Paterson
- Simon Perry
- Charlotte Rampling
- Bingham Ray
- Saskia Reeves
- Ian Rickson
- Harriet Robinson
- Stellan Skarsgård
- Jim Stark
- Becky Swift
- Danis Tanovic
- Juergen Teller
- David Thewlis
- Paul Trijbits
- Lars Von Trier
- Emily Watson
- David Yates

== Annual Awards History ==
- 2026: Lana Daher, Lebanese filmmaker at the 32nd Sarajevo Film Festival
- 2025: Christine Boateng, Ghanese producer, director and actress at the 31st Sarajevo Film Festival
- 2015: Ran Huang, Chinese contemporary artist and film director

Curator: Danny Huston

- 2014: Abdel Salam Shehadeh, film director, journalist and cameraman and Ashraf Mashharawi, director, writer and cinematographer

Curator: Ken Loach

- 2013: Dyana Gaye, French-Senegalese film director

Curator: Danny Glover

- 2012: Orwa Nyrabia and Diana El Jeiroudi, for their contribution to independent film in Syria at the 18th Sarajevo Film Festival

Curator: Jeremy Irons

- 2011: Hala Lotfy for The Strokes at the 17th Sarajevo Film Festival

Curator: Charlotte Rampling

- 2010: Ciné Institute, Haiti at the 16th Sarajevo Film Festival

Curator: Annie Nocenti

- 2009: Juanita Wilson for The Door at the 15th Sarajevo Film Festival

Curator: Stellan Skarsgård

- 2008: Faruk Šabanović at the 14th Sarajevo Film Festival

Curator: Danis Tanović

- 2007: Cary Fukunaga for Victoria Para Chino at the 13th Sarajevo Film Festival

Curator: John Lyons

- 2006: Eyas Salman and Gerd Schneider for The Edge Of Hope at the 12th Sarajevo Film Festival

Curator: Simon McBurney and Juergen Teller

- 2005: Amy Neil for Can't Stop Breathing at the 11th Sarajevo Film Festival

Curator: Emily Watson

- 2004: Greg Hall for The Plague at the 10th Sarajevo Film Festival

Curator: Mike Leigh – described the film as "Serious, funny, real, surreal, and totally anarchic. Very exciting twenty-first-century kind of cinema."
