= Career Girls =

1997 Mike Leigh film

- Theatrical release poster
- Directed by: Mike Leigh
- Written by: Mike Leigh
- Produced by: Simon Channing Williams
- Starring: Katrin Cartlidge; Lynda Steadman; Mark Benton; Kate Byers; Andy Serkis; Joe Tucker
- Cinematography: Dick Pope
- Edited by: Robin Sales
- Music by: Marianne Jean-Baptiste; Tony Remy
- Production company: Thin Man Films
- Distributed by: FilmFour Distributors
- Release dates: 1 June 1997 (New Zealand); 19 September 1997 (United Kingdom)
- Running time: 87 minutes
- Country: United Kingdom
- Language: English
- Box office: $3.1 million

Career Girls is a 1997 British comedy-drama film written and directed by Mike Leigh which tells the story of two women, who reunite after six years apart. The film stars Katrin Cartlidge and Lynda Steadman. The women were originally thrown together when they shared a flat while at university and the film focuses on their interpersonal relationship.

== Plot ==
In 1996, Annie is on the train to London to spend the weekend with Hannah, her flatmate when at polytechnic (the Polytechnic of North London) six years earlier. Hannah still holds resentment towards her alcoholic mother, and Annie talks about her mother's search for a new boyfriend. The mood is tense, Annie is in awe of her friend's apartment and financial success, while Hannah seems annoyed at the differences between them. As they go to bed, each reminisces on what brought them together.

Back in 1986, Hannah and Claire interview and accept Annie into their flat. Hannah and Claire have very different personalities: Hannah is brash and intense, while Claire is very withdrawn and meek, having a hard time looking people in the eyes, and displaying a constant nervous tic. The three women have loose plans to split up and find a new flat, each in different pairs but nothing comes to fruition. While cooking, Hannah mentions she hasn't cried since she was eight, when her parents split up. Annie, whose parents also divorced when she was eight, says she cries all the time. The following year, Ricky Burton, a socially awkward classmate, has temporarily moved in with Hannah and Annie after being kicked out by his landlord. While discussing psychological traits with them in a pub, Ricky's untactful probing angers Hannah. While Ricky visits the Chinese takeaway beneath the flat, Annie and Hannah discuss the argument and how Ricky fancies Annie. In another memory, Ricky drunkenly confesses his love for Annie, but Annie says she's in love with someone else. Ricky then disappears, prompting Hannah and Annie travel to his grandmother's home in Hartlepool. She tells them that Ricky has gone out, possibly along the seafront, so they go to look for him there.

In the present, Annie accompanies Hannah as she looks for a flat to buy. The first flat is owned by Mr Evans, who greets them in a robe while brushing his teeth. His flat is a mess, showcasing a floor-to-ceiling painting of his naked ex, and pornographic magazines. Evans drinks and smokes constantly, before hitting on Hannah who quickly rebukes him. Evans tries to convince the women to sleep with him when he learns they are not a couple, and they run out, making excuses, and laughing. At the next flat, Adrian Spinks, an estate agent, meets them. Annie realises he is an old college boyfriend, but Adrian says he doesn't recognise either of them. In between their conversations, flashbacks show Hannah and Annie's history with Adrian. After meeting him at a club, Hannah sleeps with him. The following morning, he walks into Annie's room and tries to chat her up. Annie develops feelings for Adrian and confides in him, but her feelings are not reciprocated and Adrian leaves her and the flat saying he is not looking for commitment.

In the present, Hannah and Annie learn that Adrian is married with a child. Later, at a Chinese restaurant, Annie and Hannah discuss how they have changed since university and wonder what happened to Ricky. Annie says she hadn't stopped thinking about Adrian for ten years. Hannah says she was hurt by the situation back then but said she didn't say anything because she knew that Annie was in love with him. In a flashback, Annie and Hannah cry and hug as they pack, preparing to leave their flat at the end of their four years at university.

At the present-day dinner, Hannah recalls being overwhelmed upon meeting Annie's kind family, in contrast to her own dysfunctional family. They see their old flatmate Claire jogging on Primrose Hill, and discuss the coincidence of seeing two old acquaintances in one afternoon. They decide to visit their old flat, and there spot Ricky sitting on the steps outside the Chinese takeaway, holding a toy elephant. His behaviour is erratic, and seems to have worsened since their days in university. It is not clear where he is living, and the women assume he might be homeless. He tells them he travelled from Hartlepool the previous day to meet his son, but the mother won't admit that the child is his and refuses to see him. His grandmother has also died. The conversation is difficult, culminating in Ricky accusing the women of not caring for him, which pains them into leaving him. In a final flashback to their visit to Hartlepool, the duo find Ricky by the sea. His health, both mental and physical, has deteriorated: he is babbling and no longer the charming witty stutterer. Hannah and Annie ask how he is, but Ricky rants that he doesn't care about university, and they don't care about him.

In the present, the pair return to the railway station, visibly shaken. As they part, Hannah has Annie play an oracle game they played in university, and both make loose plans to see each other again.

== Cast ==
- Katrin Cartlidge as Hannah Mills
- Lynda Steadman as Annie
- Kate Byers as Claire
- Joe Tucker as Adrian Spinks
- Mark Benton as Ricky Burton
- Andy Serkis as Mr. Evans

== Release ==
The film was screened privately at the Cannes Film Festival in May 1997 and released in New Zealand in June that same year.

== Reception ==
Career Girls received good reviews on its release in the United Kingdom. It has an 88% approval rating on Rotten Tomatoes, based on 24 reviews, with an average rating of 7.2/10. The website's critics consensus reads: "Outwardly modest but carried along by Mike Leigh's deft direction, Career Girls gradually accumulates power as a study of shared history." According to Metacritic, which sampled 25 critics and calculated a weighted average score of 76 out of 100, the film received "generally favorable reviews". Todd McCarthy of Variety called it one of Leigh's "most modest pictures, although one that offers quite a few laughs and other quirky pleasures."

The film opened in the United Kingdom on 19 September 1997 and grossed £84,938 in its opening weekend from 22 screens. After five weeks of release in the UK it had grossed £425,671 ($689,000). It grossed $2,416,734 in the United States and Canada.

== Awards and nominations ==
- European Film Awards
  - Nominated: Best Actress – Leading Role (Katrin Cartlidge)
- Evening Standard British Film Awards
  - Won: Best Actress (Katrin Cartlidge)
- Valladolid Film Festival (Spain)
  - Won: Silver Spike (Mike Leigh; tied with Cosas que dejé en La Habana)
  - Won: Youth Jury Award – Special Mention Competition (Mike Leigh)
  - Nominated: Golden Spike (Mike Leigh)
