= Thief Takers =

British television crime drama series

- Thief Takers title screen
- Genre: Crime drama
- Created by: Roy Mitchell
- Starring: Reece Dinsdale; Grant Masters; Brendan Coyle; David Sterne; Nicholas Ball; Lynda Steadman; Amanda Pays; Robert Willox; Gary McDonald; Pooky Quesnel; Simone Lahbib
- Composer: Mark Ryder
- Country of origin: United Kingdom
- Original language: English
- No. of seasons: 3
- No. of episodes: 25

Production
- Executive producers: Ted Childs (Series 1–2); Jonathan Powell (Series 3)
- Producers: Gina Cronk; Colin McKeown
- Running time: 50 minutes
- Production company: Central Independent Television

Original release
- Network: ITV
- Release: 1 February 1995 – 18 December 1997

Thief Takers is a British television crime drama series, created by Roy Mitchell, and produced by Central Independent Television for the ITV network. The series depicts the work of a team of officers based in the Metropolitan Police Service's Flying Squad, which Reece Dinsdale, Brendan Coyle, Grant Masters and Nicholas Ball appearing in the principal roles. The series was Carlton's attempt to rival Thames Television's The Bill, after the producer unexpectedly retained the series despite a major take-over by Carlton. A total of three series were broadcast between 1 February 1995 and 18 December 1997, with a total of twenty-five episodes broadcast. Each episode features a stand-alone case, with the exception of a small number of two-part episodes. However, the personal lives of each of the officers in the team provide the backdrop for a continuing story arc throughout all three series.

Reception for the third and final series was mixed, and a major shake-up in the main cast was cited as the main reason for declining viewing figures. Subsequently, the series was axed in 1998 shortly before a fourth series was set to go into production. All three series, plus the pilot episode, were released on VHS on 26 January 2000. An official book, entitled "The Inside Story", written by Geoff Tibballs, was also published to coincide with the first series. An official novelisation, written by Lee O'Keefe, was also published on 11 January 1996. Notably, the series has yet to be released on DVD.

== Cast ==
- Reece Dinsdale as DI Charlie Scott (Series 1–2)
- Grant Masters as DI Glenn Mateo (Series 3)
- Brendan Coyle as DS Bob 'Bingo' Tate (Series 1–2)
- Lynda Steadman as DS Helen Ash (Series 1)
- Amanda Pays as DS Anna Dryden (Series 2–3)
- Robert Willox as DC Ted Donachie (Series 1–3)
- Gary McDonald as DC Alan Oxford (Series 1–3)
- Pooky Quesnel as DC Grace Harris (Series 1–2)
- Simone Lahbib as DC Lucy McCarthy (Series 3)
- David Sterne as DCI Frank Utley (Series 1–3)
- Nicholas Ball as DCI Nick Hall (Series 3)
- Robert Reynolds as DI Micky Dawes (Pilot)
- Lennie James as DC Alan Oxford (Pilot)
- Sophie Dix as DC Angela Prudhoe (Pilot)

== Episodes ==
=== Pilot (1995) ===
No.	Title	Directed by	Written by	Original release date
1	"Cash and Carry"	Colin Gregg	Roy Mitchell	1 February 1995
Flying Squad officer Micky Dawes and his team trap a gang of desperate crooks specialising in supermarket heists.

=== Series 1 (1996) ===
No.	Title	Directed by	Written by	Original release date
1	"No One Likes to See That"	Colin Gregg	Roy Mitchell	25 January 1996
A heavy-duty villain escapes from jail to help pull off an audacious robbery and bump off his wife's lover into the bargain.
2	"Company of Strangers"	Terry Winsor	Brendan J. Cassin	1 February 1996
A building society is raided by three crack addicts in debt to a gangster and Oxford's investigations result in the murder of his informant Marcus. More violence erupts as the robbers turn on their boss prompting the impulsive Tate to rush unarmed into a deadly confrontation.
3	"Whispers in the Dark"	Colin Gregg	Steve Griffiths	8 February 1996
Three ex-Army men raid a security van and use their military training to stay one step ahead of Charlie's squad, who for once find themselves hopelessly outclassed. The case is given a tragic dimension by one of the crooks' twisted relationship with his daughter, which is casting a shadow over her life, but provides Ash with the clue she needs to get a result.
4	"Wild Card"	Terry Winsor	Sian Orrells	15 February 1996
Tate is shot while trying to thwart a raid on a casino and rushed to hospital in a critical condition. Harris goes undercover to nab the thugs responsible, but gives herself away by lapsing into police jargon. And as if that weren't bad enough, a highly unprofessional session between the sheets with Donachie diverts her even further away from official duties.
5	"Lie Down with Dragons (Part 1)"	Terry Winsor	Steve Griffiths	22 February 1996
Having recovered from being shot, Tate infiltrates a Chinese crime gang. Unfortunately, his cover is blown and he's forced to make a desperate deal to stay alive using a consignment of machine guns as a bargaining chip.
6	"Hungry Ghosts (Part 2)"	Terry Winsor	Steve Griffiths	29 February 1996
As the Chinatown robberies continue, Charlie takes a desperate risk, asking New Scotland Yard for a consignment of dummy weapons to lure the Big Circle into a trap. Tate reluctantly agrees to continue working undercover, but at the crucial moment crime boss Chan Ming realises he's wired for sound and it takes a bloody shoot-out to resolve the situation.
7	"The Outcasts"	Douglas Mackinnon	Brendan J. Cassin	7 March 1996
Two teenagers pull a string of audacious armed robberies, soon adding arson and murder to their list of crimes. Charlie and his squad race helter-skelter to catch them, scouring London's population of rent boys and underage prostitutes for leads but getting a result proves easier said than done.
8	"Wasteland"	Douglas Mackinnon	Len Collin	22 July 1996
A bank is ram-raided in broad daylight and Charlie's investigations lead him to a fanatical religious cult whose members are prepared to die for their charismatic leader. While wife Steph is in hospital giving birth to their first child, he spearheads a raid on the sect's base but a gunfight breaks out and it soon starts to look like he won't be around to enjoy the pleasures of family life.

=== Series 2 (1996) ===
No.	Title	Directed by	Written by	Original release date
1	"Going Under"	Colin Gregg	Roy Mitchell	10 October 1996
Whilst working undercover to expose an armed gang responsible for drug smuggling and armed robbery, Oxford is taken hostage when his true identity is leaked by a bent officer from Manchester CID. Scott is forced to plead a member of the gang for help as it becomes apparent that Oxford may be in serious danger.
2	"Nasty Boys"	Colin Gregg	Steve Griffiths	17 October 1996
Following a spectacular but unsuccessful raid on a security depot, Tate decides to infiltrate the gang responsible. He makes the acquaintance of their getaway driver and persuades him to turn informer little suspecting the multiple crises of loyalty his actions will trigger.
3	"A Dead Man"	Crispin Reece	Roy Mitchell	24 October 1996
Charlie makes a disturbing discovery while investigating an audacious robbery an old enemy he thought he'd killed years ago is very much alive and out for revenge against him and his family. The race is on to bring the villain to book before more corpses are added to his already impressive tally.
4	"Bad Blood"	Crispin Reece	Brendan J. Cassin	31 October 1996
Two female crooks raid a security van, temporarily taking a handsome passer-by hostage while they make their escape. DC Harris interviews him about his ordeal and succumbs to his charms, ending up spending the night at his flat a lapse of judgement that ultimately proves very costly indeed.
5	"Remember Me"	Alex Pillai	Brendan J. Cassin	7 November 1996
A man Donachie arrested on a rape charge 12 years earlier is released from prison and sets out for revenge, committing an armed robbery and setting up an elaborate plot to pin the blame on his old enemy. The outraged detective insists he's innocent but is his conscience entirely clear?
6	"Black Russian"	Alex Pillai	Len Collin	14 November 1996
Ruthless Russian gangsters determined to carve a niche in London's underworld steal items worth millions from a safety deposit centre, with a little help from the crooked manager. Dryden poses as a prostitute to flush them out and finds herself forced to confront demons from her past.
7	"Collateral Damage"	Colin Gregg	Steve Griffiths	21 November 1996
The Squad get their knuckles rapped for arresting an Irish ex-terrorist who turns out to be working undercover for Special Branch and DS Tate's further investigations lead him into some very murky waters indeed, uncovering a conspiracy involving his first wife and the faceless spooks of MI5.
8	"Déjà Vu"	Colin Gregg	Roy Mitchell	28 November 1996
The trial of DI Scott's arch-enemy Frank McGrath gets under way, with the smooth-talking defence lawyer leaving the police testimony in tatters. Following the inevitable acquittal, Scott considers his future in the force but it becomes all too clear that McGrath is not about to let bygones be bygones.

=== Series 3 (1997) ===
No.	Title	Directed by	Written by	Original release date
1	"Shadows"	Keith Boak	David Joss Buckley	23 October 1997
DI Glenn Matteo takes over from DI Scott as guvnor of the Met's Armed Robbery Squad, and immediately finds himself caught up in a robbery case with racial overtones.
2	"Fashion Victims"	Keith Washington	Andy Lynch	30 October 1997
Gun-toting robbers gatecrash a trendy designer's fashion show and make off with thousands of pounds' worth of clothes, leaving the Flying Squad with a puzzle on their hands. Investigations are hampered by a visiting Dutch policeman bent on catching a murderous arms dealer until a possible link emerges between his obsessive quest and the haute couture heist.
3	"One Last Hurrah"	Terry Daw	Matthew Graham	6 November 1997
DCI Hall believes the theft of plastic explosives is the work of ruthless armed robbers he tangled with back in the 1970s. Matteo isn't convinced until several violent incidents suggest rival underworld gangs are gearing up for a full-scale shoot-out.
4	"Sisters in Arms"	Keith Washington	Tony Jordan	13 November 1997
A pregnant woman is so disgusted at her husband for committing a violent robbery that she goes off the rails herself, shooting a security guard during a bungled hold-up. Persuaded by her no-good sister to persevere in her life of crime, the mixed-up mother-to-be heads for the nearest jeweller's where she promptly goes into labour.
5	"Road Rage"	Nicholas Prosser	James Quirk	20 November 1997
Villains kill two patrolmen during a shoot-out and compound the felony by taunting the Flying Squad about their crimes at every turn, leading to a final tense showdown at a service station.
6	"After the Goldrush"	Nicholas Prosser	David Joss Buckley	4 December 1997
The squad's investigation into an audacious bullion robbery leads Matteo to probe the relationship between a veteran armed robber and a stripper, while Hall faces danger among the local Asian business community.
7	"Black Mist"	David Innes Edwards	Rob Heyland	11 December 1997
Japanese crooks try to kidnap a leading stock market trader and the squad's investigations soon take on a deadly international dimension. Pitted against two of the world's most feared and formidable crime cartels, they face a fight for survival and the odds are made worse by tensions in their own ranks.
8	"Brand Loyalty"	David Innes Edwards	Rob Heyland	18 December 1997
DC Oxford fights alone and unarmed to save the witnesses, while DI Matteo jeopardises both personal and professional relationships in his desperate search for Takahashi. With an all-out war between the Mafia and their Japanese Yakuza counterparts looming, the squad find they have to use every trick in the book just to stay alive.

== See also ==
- Thief-taker
