= Of Fathers and Sons =

- German: Kinder des Kalifats
- Directed by: Talal Derki
- Produced by: Ansgar Frerich; Eva Kemme; Tobias N. Siebert; Hans Robert Eisenhauer
- Cinematography: Kahtan Hassoun
- Edited by: Anne Fabini
- Music by: Karim Sebastian Elias
- Release date: 17 November 2017 (International Documentary Festival Amsterdam)
- Running time: 99 minutes
- Countries: Germany; Syria
- Language: Syrian Arabic

Of Fathers and Sons (Arabic: عن الآباء والأبناء ʿan al-ʾābāʾ wal-ʾabnāʾ) is a 2017 Arabic-language German-Syrian documentary film directed by Talal Derki about radical jihadism and terrorist training in Syria.

== Synopsis ==
Under the guise of a photojournalist sympathetic towards Salafi jihadism, Talal Derki is allowed to enter a village controlled by the al-Nusra Front close to the front line of the Syrian Civil War, and stays with the Osama family. The family patriarch Abu Osama is an enthusiastic fanatic, openly praising the September 11 attacks and naming his children after the leaders of al-Qaeda and the Taliban. He works as a sniper and as a mine remover, and removes his children from school due to coeducation. The children, in particular the eldest son Osama, become increasingly prone to fighting and bullying.

During a mission, Abu Osama's left lower leg is blown off by a mine. Shortly afterwards, the children are sent to a radical military training camp. The boys face harsh conditions, and quickly become homesick. After returning home, Abu Osama's treasured books are destroyed in an airstrike by the Russian Air Force, and he lives by selling components from disarmed mines to bombmakers. He remains committed to his belief that the war will lead to an apocalyptic Third World War between a revived Caliphate and the Christian world and bring on the victory of the Mahdi against the Antichrist.

At the camp, Osama advances along and is prepared for further military training, while his younger brother Ayman does not do well and wants to return to school. Abu Osama takes the decisive step of teaching Osama how to shoot a gun. Before Osama leaves for a more intensive camp, he shares a riddle with Ayman. Osama undergoes three years of training and indoctrination, while Ayman returns to school.

As Osama's brigade is driven to the front for the first time and as Talal leaves to return home to Berlin, he explains that Ayman and Osama continued down their separate paths into their teenage years, and reflects upon the deep devastation of Syria.

== Cast ==
- Abu Osama - Himself
- Ayman - Himself
- Osama - Himself

== Highlights ==
Derki mentioned in an interview that he stayed there about 2 and a half years and the effective filming days were 330 days.

== Reception ==
=== Critical response ===
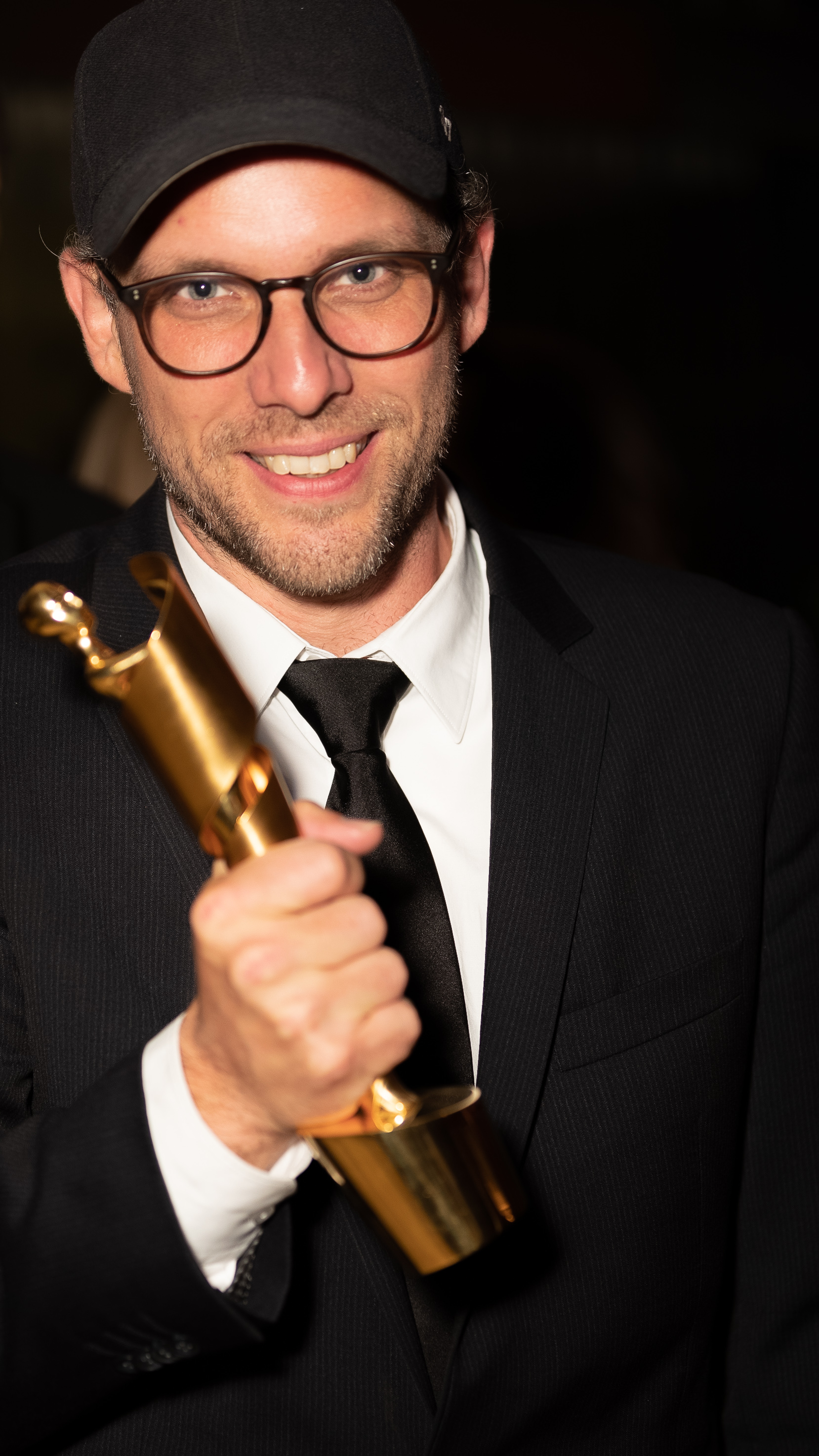
Producer Ansgar Frerich with the Lola statuette of the German Film Award 2019

Of Fathers and Sons has an approval rating of 95% on review aggregator website Rotten Tomatoes, based on 20 reviews, and an average rating of 8.23/10. It also has a score of 70 out of 100 on Metacritic, based on 7 critics, indicating "generally favorable reviews".

=== Accolades ===
- 2018 Sundance Film Festival – World Cinema Documentary Grand Jury Prize, Sundance Institute Open Borders Fellowship Presented by Netflix – won
- 14th ZagrebDox (2018) – "Grand Seal" – won
- 1st AJB DOC Festival (2018) – first prize – won
- 31st European Film Awards – Best Documentary – nomination
- 34th Independent Spirit Awards – Best Documentary Feature – nomination
- 91st Academy Awards – Best Documentary Feature – nomination
- 69th German Film Award 2019 – Winner of the Award for Best Documentary Film (Ansgar Frerich, Eva Kemme, Tobias N. Siebert, Hans Robert Eisenhauer) and the Award for Best Editing (Anne Fabini).
