= Sara Abi Kanaan =

Lebanese actress

- Born: Beirut, Lebanon
- Occupation: Actress

Sara Abi Kanaan is a Lebanese actress. She began her acting career at the age of 11 in the Lebanese series “Bent El Hay”.

She is the first Arab actress that was nominated to win the iEmmys award in 2018 and she won the Murex D'or award two times, first, in 2013 for being the Best Promising Actress on her roles in the Lebanese series "Al Kinaa" and "Awwel Marra" and in the Lebanese movie "24 Hours of Love", secondly, in 2015 for being the Best Supporting Actress on her roles in the Pan Arab series "Laow", "Ittiham" and "Ishq El Nesaa".. She was also nominated for Best Actress in 2017 on her roles in the Lebanese series "Kawalis Al Madina" and "Ossit Hob".

She studied two majors, Medical Laboratory Sciences and Pharmacy.

== Acting credits ==
=== TV series ===
- Bent El Hay "Hoda".
- Khotwit Hob "Asma".
- Oyoun Al Amal "Maha".
- Al Kinaa "Ibtisam".
- Duo Al Gharam "Joumana".
- Awwel Marra "Tonia".
- Ittiham "Soha".
- Laow "Rasha".
- Ishq El Nesaa "Sara".
- Bent Al Shahbandar "Aaman".
- Ossit Hob "Mira".
- Layleh Hamra (Sarkhit Rouh) "Zeina".
- Kawalis Al Madina "Ola".
- Al Shakikatan "Doha".
- Thawrat AlFallahin "Foutoun".
- The Last Chance (Madraset El Hobb) "Selena".
- Sayf Bared "Sally".
- Bel Alb "Diana".

=== Lebanese movies ===
- 24 Hours of Love "Claire".
- Broken Keys

=== American movies ===
- JACIR "Seema".
- A star in the desert "Fatimeh".

== Achievements and awards ==
- 2013, won 'Best Promising Actress' award at the Murex d'Or.
- 2015, hosted the first "Asian World Film Festival" that took place in Los Angeles, California.
- 2015, won 'Best Supporting Actress' award at Murex d'Or.
- 2017, nominated as 'Best Leading Actress' award at Murex d'Or.
- 2017, was chosen by the iEmmys Academy as the youngest and only Lebanese juror for the semi-final rounds of the iEmmys awards that took place in Abu Dhabi.
- 2018, hosted the fourth "Asian World Film Festival" that took place in Los Angeles, California
- 2018, was nominated to win the iEmmys award after being qualified to the final round of the Young Creatives Award competition organized by the iEmmys academy.
