= Katrin Cartlidge =

English actress (1961–2002)

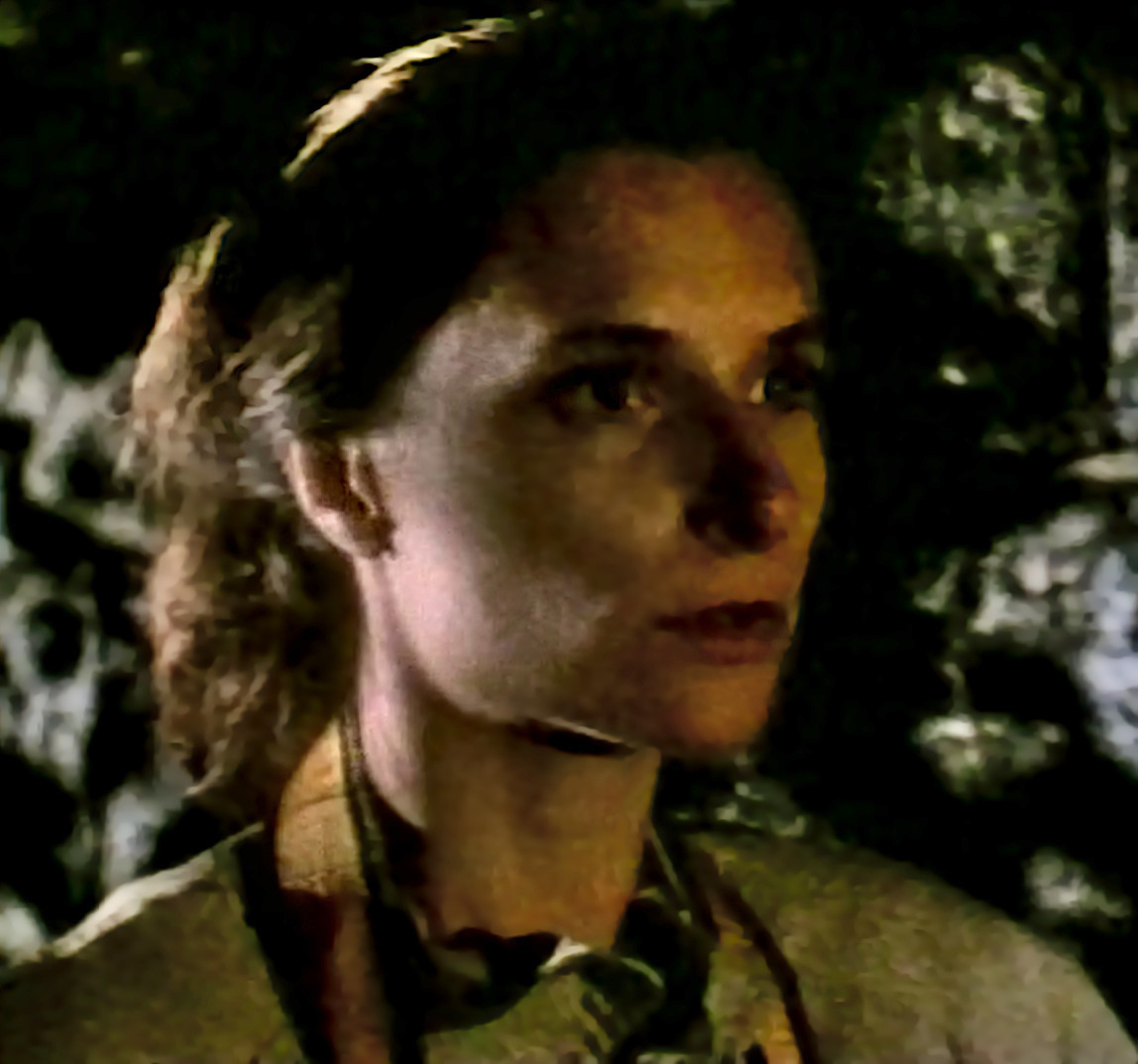
- Cartlidge in Nightlife (1996)
- Born: Katrin Juliet Cartlidge; 15 May 1961; Westminster, London, England
- Died: 7 September 2002 (aged 41); Hampstead, London, England
- Occupation: Actress
- Years active: 1982–2002
- Notable work: Naked (1993); Breaking the Waves (1996); Career Girls (1997); No Man's Land (2001)
- Partner: Peter Gevisser

Katrin Juliet Cartlidge (15 May 1961 – 7 September 2002) was an English actress. She first appeared on screen as Lucy Collins in the Channel 4 soap opera Brookside (1982–1983), before going on to win the 1997 Evening Standard Film Award for Best Actress for the Mike Leigh film Career Girls. Her other film appearances included Leigh's Naked (1993), as well as the films Before the Rain (1994), Breaking the Waves (1996), and From Hell (2001).

== Early life ==
Cartlidge was born in London, to Derek, an English father and Bobbi, a German-Jewish refugee mother. She was educated at the Parliament Hill School for Girls in Camden.

== Career ==
Cartlidge's work in the Milcho Manchevski film Before the Rain (1994) and in No Man's Land (2001) made her well known in Bosnia and Herzegovina and the Balkans. Her first leading role was playing Sophie in Mike Leigh's Naked (1993). Cartlidge worked in two more Leigh films: in Career Girls (1997) she played one of the lead roles, Hannah, at the ages of both 20 and 30, and in Topsy Turvy (1999) she was a madam in a Paris brothel. She was due to play the lead role in Polish director Lech Majewski's 2004 film The Garden of Earthly Delights—that of an art historian dying of cancer—but she left shortly before production began. Cartlidge won a role in 21 Grams but was replaced by Charlotte Gainsbourg due to her death. Cartlidge was also filming Dogville at the time of her death and was replaced by Patricia Clarkson.

== Death and legacy ==
Cartlidge died at the age of 41 on 7 September 2002, of complications arising from pneumonia and septicaemia caused by a pheochromocytoma.

The impact of Cartlidge's sudden death saw the creation of the Katrin Cartlidge Foundation by the trustees Mike Leigh, Peter Gevisser, Simon McBurney, Chris Simon, and Cat Villiers. The patrons include Lars von Trier and Cartlidge's sister Michelle. Established at the Sarajevo Film Festival, an annual bursary is awarded by "an elected curator, chosen by the (Foundation) Trustees from a wide and eclectic number of Katrin Cartlidge’s friends and colleagues...(to) a new creative voice... While the new talent nominated each year will be a filmmaker, it is anticipated that the choices will be as varied and extraordinary as Katrin’s own choice of filmmakers and friends from across the arts."

Mike Leigh wrote: "She took to the improvisation and character work instantly, easily and with extraordinary commitment and imagination. Other than in the Royal Court Young Peoples Theatre, she had had no formal training, but you would never have guessed it. (Drama Centre London turned her down, and that put her off). [...] She often talked to me about [a] move into directing. I am in no doubt that we have lost not only one of our greatest actors but also one of the most interesting new directors of the future."

Following her death, English singer Morrissey dedicated a performance of his song "Late Night, Maudlin Street" at the Royal Albert Hall to Cartlidge, describing her as a "brilliant person and fantastic actor".

Tracy Letts dedicated his 2003 play Man from Nebraska to Cartlidge, stating "Man from Nebraska is dedicated to the memory of my dear friend Katrin Cartlidge".

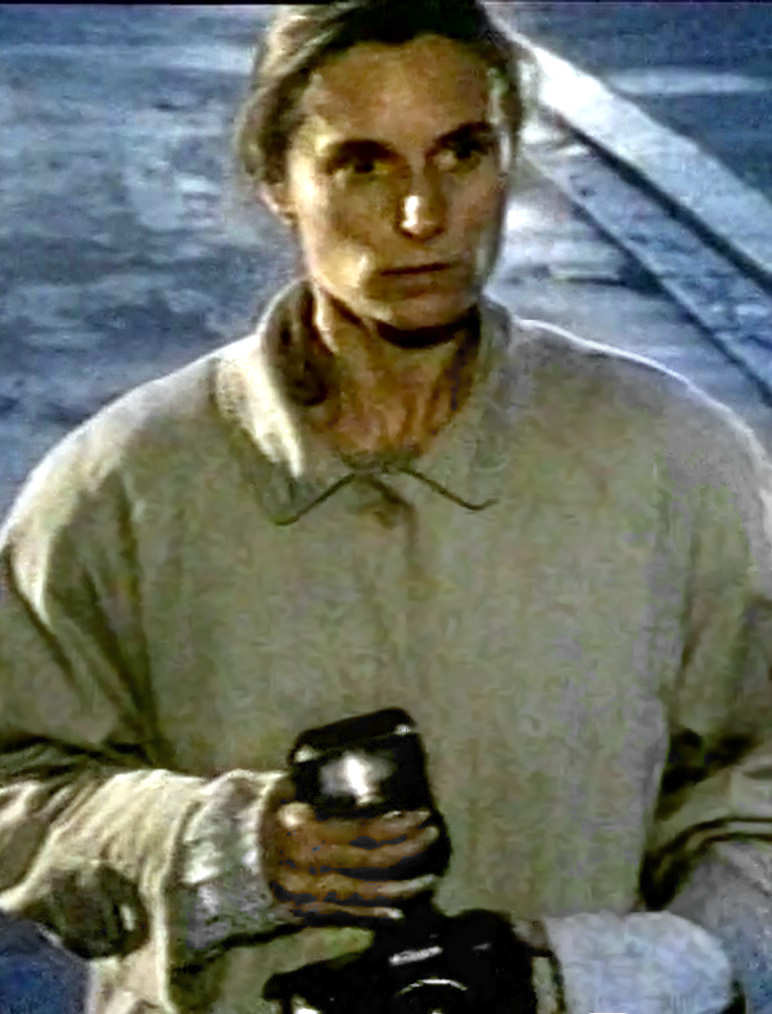
Katrin Cartlidge in Nightlife TV film (1996)

== Filmography ==
=== Film ===
Year	Title	Role	Director	Notes
1985	Sacred Hearts	Doris	Barbara Rennie	
1987	Eat the Rich	Katrin	Peter Richardson	The Comic Strip feature film
1993	Naked	Sophie	Mike Leigh	
1994	Before the Rain	Anne	Milcho Manchevski	
1996	Merisairas	Elena Polakov	Veikko Aaltonen	Alternatively titled "Seasick"
1996	Breaking the Waves	Dodo McNeill	Lars von Trier	Bodil Award for Best Actress in a Supporting Role; Robert Award for Best Actress in a Supporting Role
1997	Career Girls	Hannah Mills	Mike Leigh	Evening Standard British Film Award for Best Actress; Boston Society of Film Critics Award for Best Actress (2nd place); Nominated — European Film Award for Best Actress
1998	Claire Dolan	Claire Dolan	Lodge Kerrigan	Nominated — Independent Spirit Award for Best Female Lead
1998	Hi-Life	April	Roger Hedden	
1999	The Lost Son	Emily	Chris Menges	
1999	Topsy-Turvy	Madame	Mike Leigh	
1999	The Cherry Orchard	Varya	Michael Cacoyannis	
2000	Hotel Splendide	Cora Blanche	Terence Gross	
2000	The Weight of Water	Karen Christenson	Kathryn Bigelow	
2001	No Man's Land	Jane Livingstone	Danis Tanović	
2001	From Hell	Annie Chapman	Hughes Brothers	
2010	Dimension	N/A	Lars von Trier	Unfinished

=== Television ===
Year	Title	Role	Notes
1982–83, 1990	Brookside	Lucy Collins	Soap opera • 51 episodes
1986	The Collectors	Beattie Haycock	Season 1, Episode 7: "The Dog It Was..."
1987	Bulman	Rose	Season 2, Episode 7: "Ministry of Accidents"
1988	The Comic Strip Presents...	Maria	Season 3, Episode 6: "Funseekers"
1993	The Chief	Liz Williams	Season 3, Episode 3: "A Long Cold Lonely Winter"
1994	Capital Lives	Carole	Season 1, Episode 6: "Repossessed"
1996	Screen Two	Lover in Cafe	Episode: "Look Me in the Eye"

=== Television films and short works ===
Year	Title	Role	Notes
1993	Kolinsky	Unknown role(s)	Short film
1994	Normandy: The Great Crusade	Clara Milburn (voice)	Television short
1994	Nobody's Children	Viorica	Television film
1994	Fever	Claire	Short film
1995	3 Steps to Heaven	Suzanne / Candy / Billie	Television film
1995	Narance	Manya	Short film
1996	Nightlife	Robin	Television film
1996	Saint-Ex	Gabrielle de Saint-Exupéry	Television film
2000	Cinderella	Goneril	Television film
2001	Sword of Honour	Julia Stitch	Television film
2002	Crime and Punishment	Katerina Ivanovna	Television film
2002	Surrealissimo: The Scandalous Success of Salvador Dali	Gala Dali	Television special
2002	Eddie Loves Mary	Unknown role	Short film • posthumous release
