= Ossama Mohammed =

Syrian film director

- Born: 21 March 1954 (age 72); Latakia, Syria
- Occupations: Film director Screenwriter
- Years active: 1988–present

Ossama Mohammed (Arabic: أسامة محمد; born 21 March 1954) is a Syrian film director and screenwriter. His film, The Box of Life, was screened in the Un Certain Regard section at the 2002 Cannes Film Festival.

He is currently living in exile in Paris, where he collaborated on Silvered Water, Syria Self-Portrait.

== Filmography ==
- Khutwa Khutwa (Step by Step) (1978)
- Stars in Broad Daylight (1988)
- Al-Lail (Screenwriter) (1992)
- The Box of Life (2002)
- Silvered Water, Syria Self-Portrait (2014)
