= Mass media in Saudi Arabia =

Mass media in Saudi Arabia provides unwavering support for the Mohammed bin Salman regime and routinely ignores negative reporting about the kingdom. Independent media are non-existent in Saudi Arabia. Outlets and journalists that fail to support the regime are subject to suspicion and repression. Journalists, activists and religious figures who dissent from the government are routinely imprisoned, tortured and killed by the state.

Most are privately owned but are subsidized and regulated by the government in Saudi Arabia. The "Basic Law" of the kingdom states that the mass media's role is to educate and inspire national unity; consequently, most popular grievances go unreported in Saudi Arabia. For instance, the invasion of Kuwait by Iraq in 1990 was not immediately reported in the Saudi Arabian mass media. As of 2013, BBC News reports that criticism of the government and the royal family and the questioning of Islamic tenets "are not generally tolerated. Self-censorship is pervasive." As of 2025, Freedom House rates the kingdom's press and internet "Not Free".

== Overview ==
As of 2006, the government has allowed some critical stories to be written by selected journalists. Although self-censorship continues to be a method of self-preservation for the nation's media outlets, government censorship seems to be decreasing, especially on journalistic inquiries into crime and terrorism. Newspapers are created by royal decree. There are more than a dozen dailies. Pan-Arab newspapers from other countries are available but subject to censorship. The government (BSKSA) operates almost all domestic broadcasting outlets in Saudi Arabia. Censors remove objectionable material deemed offensive by the standards of Islam, including references to pork, Christianity and other religions, alcohol and sex. Private TV stations cannot operate from Saudi soil. Although government officials monitor Internet sites for material deemed pornographic, politically offensive, or anti-Islamic, Saudi Internet users can gain access to most sites by simply connecting through an alternative server. The government created an appeals process circa 2006 by which citizens can request that particular websites be unblocked. As of 2014 there were 17.4 million internet users.

Article 39 of the "Basic Law" of the kingdom states:

Mass media and all other vehicles of expression shall employ civil and polite language, contribute towards the education of the nation and strengthen unity. It is prohibited to commit acts leading to disorder and division, affecting the security of the state and its public relations, or undermining human dignity and rights.

== Pan-Arab broadcasting ==
Saudi media has influence outside of the borders of the kingdom, as the country is "a major market for pan-Arab satellite and pay-TV". Saudi investors are behind the major networks Middle East Broadcasting Center (MBC), which is based in Dubai, and Bahrain-based Orbit Showtime. Middle East Broadcasting Center (MBC) was launched in London, shortly after the 1991 Gulf War. In 1993 the entertainment, music and sport network Arab Radio and Television Network was founded by Saudi mogul Saleh Abdullah Kamel. From 1994 until 1996 when it was pulled off the air, BBC Arabic Television channel was run by Rome-based Orbit Communications Company, a subsidiary of the Saudi Arabian Mawarid Holding. It was launched again in March 2008 as part of BBC World Service. Saudi Prince Al-Waleed bin Talal owns the Rotana Group media entertainment conglomerate and in late 2011 acquired a $300 million stake in the social media site Twitter.

According to As'ad AbuKhalil, (author and political science professor at California State University, Stanislaus), “It is now a taboo in Arab culture to criticize Saudi. Even [Lebanon's] Hezbullah media is careful, and in Qatar media criticism has been going down, it has been very sensitive." One reason for this caution is that journalists who run critical stories "jeopardize their future careers, particularly if they aspire to work for the higher paying Gulf and Saudi networks." According to AbuKhalil, “As a journalist today you cannot criticize Saudi – where would you work?” Another is that "40-70% of the region's advertising" comes from Saudi Arabian companies, organizations, etc. "Networks, TV channels and publications are not going to risk jeopardizing their cash flow by upsetting their prime advertising market in the region's largest economy," according to Arab Media & Society.

== Freedom of speech ==
Saudi Arabia does not tolerate dissidents and impose penalties on such people. It is responsible for executing Saudi-American journalist, Jamal Khashoggi, in 2018. As he entered a Saudi embassy in Istanbul, Turkey, a group of Saudi assassins murdered him.

== Television channels ==
- Al Ekhbariya (News)
- Al Arabiya (News)
- Al-Hadath (News)
- KSA SPORTS
- MBC 1 (TV shows &news$ talk shows)Middle East
- MBC 2 (Hollywood movies)
- MBC 3 (Kids)
- MBC 4 (Hollywood TV shows)
- Rotana Cinema
- Rotana Khalejiah (Talk shows $ Arab TV shows)
- Rotana Music
- MBC Drama (Middle East)
- MBC Max (Hollywood movies)
- MBC+ Drama
- Saudi T.V. Channel 1
- QURAN TV
- SUUNA TV
- Wanasah (Music)
- Faaliat (Main events)
- MBC Bollywood

== Newspapers ==
=== Arabic daily newspapers ===
- Al-Bilad
- Al Eqtisadiah
- Al Jazirah
- Al Madina
- Al Nadwa (newspaper)
- Al Riyadh
- Al Watan
- Al Yaum
- Okaz

=== English daily newspapers ===
- Al-Hayat (ceased in 2020)
- Arab News
- Asharq Al-Awsat
- Saudi Gazette

=== Malayalam daily newspapers ===
- Madhyamam
  - Jeddah edition – January 16, 2006
  - Riyadh edition – December 10, 2007
  - Dammam edition – May 24, 2008
  - Abha edition – January 1, 2011
- Gulf Thejas
  - Riyadh edition – March 2011
  - Dammam edition – March 2011
  - Jeddah edition – March 2011

== See also ==
- List of companies of Saudi Arabia
- Lists of television channels
- Television in Saudi Arabia
