= List of single-camera situation comedies =

In television programming, the situation comedy or sitcom may be recorded using either a multiple-camera setup or a single-camera setup. Single-camera sitcoms are often notable for their enhanced visual style, use of real-world filming locations and in recent years, for not having a laugh track (most single-camera sitcoms from the 1960s contained a laugh track). Some, but not all, single-camera comedy series may also be classified as comedy-drama, a genre which blends comedic and dramatic elements. The distinction between a sitcom and a comedy-drama series is based on the show's content, not its form.

== # ==
Title	Years aired	Network
10 Items or Less	2006–2009	TBS
10 Things I Hate About You	2009–2010	ABC Family
100 Things to Do Before High School	2014–2016	Nickelodeon
1600 Penn	2012–2013	NBC
18 to Life	2010–2011	CBC
1st & Ten	1984–1991	HBO
2gether	2000–2001	MTV
30 Rock	2006–2013	NBC

== A ==
Title	Years aired	Network
A J Wentworth, BA	1982	ITV1
A.P. Bio	2018–2021	NBC/Peacock
Abbott Elementary	2021–	ABC
About a Boy	2014–2015	NBC
Absolute Power	2003–2005	BBC Two
Ace Crawford, Private Eye	1983	CBS
Action	1999	Fox
The Addams Family	1964–1966	ABC
The Adventures of Ozzie and Harriet	1952–1966	ABC
The Adventures of Pete & Pete	1993–1996	Nickelodeon
After Lately	2011–2013	E!
AfterMASH	1983–1985	CBS
Affairs of the Heart	1983–1985	ITV1
Airwaves	1986–1987	CBC
Alex, Inc.	2018	ABC
Aliens in America	2007–2008	The CW
All Night	2018	Hulu
Ally McBeal	1997–2002	Fox
Almost Heroes	2011	Showcase
Alone Together	2018	Freeform
American Auto	2021–2023	NBC
American Body Shop	2007	Comedy Central
American Housewife	2016–2020	ABC
An American in Canada	2003–2004	CBC
Andi Mack	2017–2019	Disney Channel
Andy Barker, P.I.	2007	NBC
The Andy Dick Show	2001–2002	MTV
The Andy Griffith Show	1960–1968	CBS
Andy Richter Controls the Universe	2002–2003	Fox
Angel from Hell	2016	CBS
Angie Tribeca	2016–2018	TBS
Angry Boys	2011	ABC1
Animal Control	2023–	Fox
Animal Practice	2012	NBC
Another Period	2015–2018	Comedy Central
Arliss	1996–2003	HBO
Arnie	1970–1972	CBS
Arrested Development	2003–2006, 2013–2019	Fox/Netflix
Arresting Behavior	1992	ABC
As If	2001–2004	Channel 4
As If	2002	UPN
Atlanta	2016–2022	FX
Austin Stories	1997–1998	MTV

== B ==
Title	Years aired	Network
Back in the Game	2013–2014	ABC
Bad Judge	2014–2015	NBC
The Bad News Bears	1979–1980	CBS
Bad Teacher	2014	CBS
Bakersfield P.D.	1993–1994	Fox
Barbershop	2005	Showtime
Batman	1966–1968	ABC
Battleground	2012–	Hulu
Beautiful People	2006–2007	BBC Two
Ben and Kate	2012–2013	Fox
Benidorm	2007–	ITV1
Bent	2012	NBC
The Bernie Mac Show	2001–2006	Fox
Best Friends Forever	2012	NBC
Better Off Ted	2009–2010	ABC
The Beverly Hillbillies	1962–1971	CBS
Beverly Hills Buntz	1987–1988	CBS
Bewitched	1964–1972	ABC
The Big C	2010–2013	Showtime
Big Day	2006–2007	ABC
Big Girl's Blouse	1994–1995	Seven
Big Time in Hollywood, FL	2015	Comedy Central
Big Time Rush	2009–2013	Nickelodeon
The Bill Cosby Show	1969–1971	NBC
Bill & Ted's Excellent Adventures	1992	Fox
Black Tie Affair	1993	NBC
Black-ish	2014–2022	ABC
Blandings	2013–2014	BBC One
Bless This Mess	2019–2020	ABC
Blessed	2005	BBC One
The Bleak Old Shop of Stuff	2011–2012	BBC Two
Blockbuster	2022	Netflix
Blue Heaven	1994	Channel 4
Blue Mountain State	2010–2011	Spike
The Book Group	2002–2003	Channel 4
Bored to Death	2009–2011	HBO
The Brady Bunch	1969–1974	ABC
Breaking In	2011–2012	Fox
Bridget Loves Bernie	1972–1973	CBS
The Brink	2015	HBO
Broad City	2014–2019	Comedy Central
Brockmire	2017–2020	IFC
Brooklyn Bridge	1991–1993	CBS
Brooklyn Nine-Nine	2013–2021	Fox/NBC
The Brothers Garcia	2000–2004	Nickelodeon
Brutally Normal	2000	The WB
Buffalo Bill	1983–1984	NBC
Bullet in the Face	2012	IFC
The Business	2006–2007	The Movie Network

== C ==
Title	Years aired	Network
The Café	2011–2013	Sky1
Californication	2007–2014	Showtime
Call Me Fitz	2010–2013	HBO Canada
Campus	2009–2011	Channel 4
Campus Cops	1996	USA
Campus Ladies	2006–2007	Oxygen
Captain Nice	1967	NBC
Car 54, Where Are You?	1961–1963	NBC
Carpoolers	2007–2008	ABC
Cavemen	2007	ABC
Champions	2018	NBC
Chandon Pictures	2007–2009	Movie Extra
Clueless	1996–1999	ABC/UPN
CollegeHumor Show, The	2009	MTV
Come Fly with Me	2010–2011	BBC One
Comeback, The	2005, 2014, 2026	HBO
Community	2009–2015	NBC/Yahoo!
Coogan's Run	1995	BBC Two
Cooper Barrett's Guide to Surviving Life	2016	Fox
Corner Gas	2004–2009	CTV
Corporate	2018–2020	Comedy Central
Cougar Town	2009–2015	ABC/TBS
The Courtship of Eddie's Father	1969–1972	ABC
Cracking Up	2004	Fox
Crazy Ones, The	2013–2014	CBS
Cut	2017–2018	MBC2/MBC Max/MBC4/MBC Action
Cuckoo	2012–2019	BBC Three
Cup, The	2008	BBC Two
Curb Your Enthusiasm	2000–2024	HBO

== D ==
Title	Years aired	Network
Da Ali G Show (second season and after)	2003–2004	HBO
Dan for Mayor	2010–2011	CBS
Danger Theatre	1993	Fox
Danny	2001	CBS
The Days and Nights of Molly Dodd	1987–1991	NBC/Lifetime
Dead Boss	2012	BBC Three
Dead Man Weds	2005	ITV1
Delocated	2008–2013	Adult Swim
Dennis the Menace	1959–1963	CBS
Derek	2012–2014	Channel 4
The Detour	2016–2019	TBS
Detroiters	2017–2018	Comedy Central
Diary of a Bad Man	2010–2013	YouTube
Dinosaurs	1991–1994	ABC
DMV	2025–2026	CBS
Do Over	2002	The WB
Dog Bites Man	2006	Comedy Central
The Donna Reed Show	1958–1966	ABC
Donny!	2015	USA Network
Don't Trust the B— in Apartment 23	2012–2014	ABC
Doogie Howser, M.D.	1989–1993	ABC
Downward Dog	2017	ABC
Dream On	1990–1996	HBO
The Drew Carey Show (ninth season)	2004	ABC
Drama Club	2021	Nickelodeon
The Duck Factory	1984	NBC

== E ==
Title	Years aired	Network
Early Doors	2003–2004	BBC Two
Eastbound & Down	2009–2013	HBO
Ed	2000–2004	NBC
Eerie, Indiana	1991–1992	NBC
Emily's Reasons Why Not	2006	ABC
Empty	2008	BBC Two
Enlightened	2011–2013	HBO
Entourage	2004–2011	HBO
Episodes	2011–2017	Showtime
Even Stevens	2000–2003	Disney Channel
Everybody Hates Chris	2005–2009	UPN/The CW
Exes and Ohs	2007–2011	Logo
Extras	2005–2007	BBC Two

== F ==
Title	Years aired	Network
F Troop	1965–1967	ABC
Factory	2008	Spike
Fairly Secret Army	1984–1986	Channel 4
The Fall and Rise of Reggie Dinkins	2026–	NBC
The Famous Jett Jackson	1998–2001	Disney Channel
Family Affair	1966–1971	CBS
Family Affair	2002	The WB
The Farmer's Daughter	1963–1966	ABC
Fast Layne	2019	Disney Channel
Fat Actress	2005	Showtime
Fear, Stress & Anger	2007	BBC Two
Feel the Force	2006	BBC Two
Ferris Bueller	1990–1991	NBC
Flight of the Conchords	2007–2010	HBO
The Flying Nun	1967–1970	ABC
FM	2009	ITV2
Frank's Place	1987–1988	CBS
Fred: The Show	2012	Nickelodeon
Free Agents	2009	Channel 4
Free Agents	2011	NBC
Free Radio	2008–2009	VH1
Free Ride	2006	Fox
Fresh Off the Boat	2015–2020	ABC
Freezing	2008	BBC Two
Friday Night Dinner	2011–2020	Channel 4
Friends with Benefits	2011	NBC
From a Bird's Eye View	1970–1971	ATV

== G ==
Title	Years aired	Network
Gabby Duran & the Unsittables	2019–2021	Disney Channel
The Game	2006–2015	The CW/BET
Garth Marenghi's Darkplace	2004	Channel 4
Gary: Tank Commander	2009–2012	BBC Two Scotland/BBC One Scotland
Gavin & Stacey	2007–2010	BBC Three/BBC One
The Gemma Factor	2010	BBC Three
Get Smart	1965–1970	NBC/CBS
Get Smart	1995	Fox
Getting On	2009–2012	BBC Four
The Ghost & Mrs. Muir	1968–1970	NBC/ABC
Ghosts (UK)	2019–2023	BBC One
Ghosts (US)	2021–	CBS
Gidget	1965–1966	ABC
Gigantic	2010–2011	TeenNick
Gilligan's Island	1964–1967	CBS
The Girl with Something Extra	1973–1974	NBC
Girls	2012–2017	HBO
Going Dutch	2025–2026	Fox
The Goldbergs	2013-2023	ABC
Goldie's Oldies	2021	Nickelodeon UK
Go Fish	2001	NBC
Go On	2012–2013	NBC
Gomer Pyle, U.S.M.C.	1964–1969	CBS
Good Girls Don't	2003	Oxygen
The Good Place	2016–2020	NBC
Goodnight Burbank	2011	AXS TV
Grand Crew	2021–2023	NBC
Grandma's House	2010–2012	BBC Two
Grapevine	1992	CBS
Grapevine	2000	CBS
Gravity	2010	Starz
Great News	2017–2018	NBC
The Great Outdoors	2010	BBC Four
Great Scott!	1992	Fox
Green Acres	1965–1971	CBS
Greg the Bunny	2002–2006	Fox/IFC
Grosse Pointe	2000–2001	The WB
Growing Up Fisher	2014	NBC
The Guest Book	2017–2018	TBS

== H ==
Title	Years aired	Network
Halfway Home	2007	Comedy Central
HaMisrad	2010	yes Comedy
The Hank McCune Show	1950	NBC
Happy Days (first and second seasons)	1974–1975	ABC
Happy Endings	2011–2013	ABC
The Hard Times of RJ Berger	2010–2011	MTV
Hardware	2003–2004	ITV1
Harry and the Hendersons	1991–1993	Syndication
Hatching, Matching and Dispatching	2006	CBC
Hazel	1966	NBC/CBS
Head Case	2007–2009	Starz
Heading Out	2013	BBC Two
Help Me Help You	2006	ABC
Hennesey	1959–1962	CBS
Herbie, the Love Bug	1982	CBS
Hidden Hills	2002–2003	NBC
Him & Her	2010–2013	BBC Three
The Hitchhiker's Guide to the Galaxy	1981	BBC Two
Hogan's Heroes	1965–1971	CBS
Hollywood 7	2001	ABC Family
Hollywood Residential	2008	Starz
Honey, I Shrunk the Kids: The TV Show	1997–2000	Syndication
Hooperman	1987–1989	ABC
House Calls	1979–1982	CBS
House of Lies	2012–2016	Showtime
How Not to Live Your Life	2007–2011	BBC Three
How to Live with Your Parents (For the Rest of Your Life)	2013	ABC
How to Make It in America	2010–2011	HBO
Hung	2009–2011	HBO
Hyperdrive	2006–2007	BBC Two

== I ==
Title	Years aired	Network
I Dream of Jeannie	1965–1970	NBC
I Feel Bad	2018	NBC
I Hate My 30's	2007	VH1
I Just Want My Pants Back	2011–2012	MTV
I Rock	2010	ABC2
Ideal	2005–2011	BBC Three
Idiotsitter	2014–2017	Comedy Central
I'm Alan Partridge	1997–2002	BBC Two
Imaginary Mary	2017	ABC
InSecurity	2011	CBC
In Case of Emergency	2007	ABC
In the Motherhood	2009	ABC
The Inbetweeners	2008–2010	E4
The Inbetweeners	2012	MTV
It's About Time	1966–1967	CBS
It's Always Sunny in Philadelphia	2005–	FX/FXX
The Increasingly Poor Decisions of Todd Margaret	2010–2012	IFC

== J ==
Title	Years aired	Network
Jack of All Trades	2000	Syndication
The Jake Effect	2006	Bravo
Jake in Progress	2005–2006	ABC
Jam & Jerusalem	2006–2009	BBC One
Jane the Virgin	2014-2019	The CW
The Jaquie Brown Diaries	2008–2009	TV3
Jennifer Falls	2014	TV Land
The Jersey	1999-2004	Disney Channel
The Jim Gaffigan Show	2015–2016	TV Land
The Jimmy Stewart Show	1971–1972	NBC
La Job	2006–2007	Bell Satellite TV
The Job	2001–2002	ABC
Joe Bash	1986	ABC
Jon Benjamin Has a Van	2011	Comedy Central
The Jon Dore Television Show	2007–2009	The Comedy Network
Jonas	2009–2010	Disney Channel
Julia	1968–1971	NBC
Just Our Luck	1983	ABC
K Street	2003	HBO

== K ==
Title	Years aired	Network
Kath & Kim	2002–2007	ABC1/Seven
Kath & Kim	2008–2009	NBC
Kaya	2007	MTV
Kenan	2021–2022	NBC
The Kids Are Alright	2018–2019	ABC
Kim's Convenience	2016–2021	CBC
Kirby Buckets	2014–2017	Disney XD
Kitchen Confidential	2005	Fox
The Knights of Prosperity	2007	ABC
Kröd Mändoon and the Flaming Sword of Fire	2009	Comedy Central

== L ==
Title	Years aired	Network
La La Land	2010	Showtime
L.A. 7	2000	ABC Family
LA to Vegas	2018	Fox
The Larry Sanders Show	1992–1998	HBO
The Last Man on Earth	2015–2018	Fox
The Last O.G.	2018–2021	TBS
Lead Balloon	2006–2011	BBC Four/BBC Two
The League	2009–2015	FX
The League of Gentlemen (Christmas special and after)	2000–2002	BBC Two
Leap of Faith	2002	NBC
Leave It to Beaver	1957–1963	CBS/ABC
Legit	2013–2014	FX
Less Than Kind	2008–2013	City/HBO Canada
Level Up	2012–2013	Cartoon Network
The Librarians	2007–	ABC1
The Life and Times of Vivienne Vyle	2007	BBC Two
Life in Pieces	2015–2019	CBS
Life with Derek	2005–2009	Family Channel
Life's Too Short	2011–2013	BBC Two
Linc's	1998–2000	Showtime
Little Mosque on the Prairie	2007–2012	CBC
Little Angels	2008-2009	Acasă TV
Lizzie McGuire	2001–2004	Disney Channel
Lockie Leonard	2007–2010	Nine Network
The Loop	2006–2007	Fox
The Lot	1996–1998	AMC
Louie	2009–2015	FX
Love on a Rooftop	1966–1967	ABC
Love Soup	2005–2008	BBC One
Lovespring International	2006	Lifetime
Lucky	2003	FX

== M ==
Title	Years aired	Network
Made in Canada	1998–2003	CBC
Malcolm in the Middle	2000–2006	Fox
Man Up!	2011	ABC
Manchild	2002–2003	BBC Two
Manhattan, AZ	2000	USA
Mary Hartman, Mary Hartman	1976–1977	Syndication
M*A*S*H	1972–1983	CBS
Maybe It's Me	2001–2002	The WB
Mayberry R.F.D.	1968–1971	CBS
The Mayor	2017	ABC
McHale's Navy	1962–1966	ABC
Men, Women & Dogs	2001	The WB
Method & Red	2004	Fox
Miami 7	1999	ABC Family
Michael: Tuesdays and Thursdays	2011–2017	CBS
Michael & Michael Have Issues	2009	Comedy Central
The Michael J. Fox Show	2013–2014	NBC
The Mick	2017–2018	Fox
The Middle	2009–2018	ABC
The Midnight Beast	2012–2014	E4
The Mighty Boosh	2004–2007	BBC Three
The Mind of the Married Man	2001–2002	HBO
The Mindy Project	2012–2017	Fox/Hulu
The Minor Accomplishments of Jackie Woodman	2006–2007	IFC
Miracle Workers	2019–2023	TBS
Misfits	2009–2013	E4
Miss Guided	2008	ABC
Miss Farah	2019–2022	MBC4/MBC Max/MBC+ Variety/Dubai One/Shahid.net
Mister Ed	1961–1966	Syndication/CBS
Mister Terrific	1967	CBS
Mixed-ish	2019–2021	ABC
Modern Family	2009–2020	ABC
Mongrels	2010–2011	BBC Three
The Monkees	1966–1968	NBC
Moone Boy	2012–2015	Sky 1
Moose TV	2007	Showcase
Morton & Hayes	1991	CBS
Mr. Mayor	2021–2022	NBC
Mr. Meaty	2006–2009	Nickelodeon/CBC
Mr. Sunshine	2011	ABC
The Munsters	1964–1966	CBS
Murder Most Horrid	1991–1999	BBC Two
My Boys	2006–2010	TBS
My Favorite Martian	1963–1966	CBS
My Guide to Becoming a Rock Star	2002	The WB
My Living Doll	1964–1965	CBS
My Mother the Car	1965–1966	NBC
My Name Is Earl	2005–2009	NBC
M.Y.O.B.	2000	NBC
My Three Sons	1960–1972	ABC/CBS
My World and Welcome to It	1969–1970	NBC

== N ==
Title	Years aired	Network
Næturvaktin	2007	Stöð 2
The Naked Brothers Band	2007–2009	Nickelodeon
Naked Josh	2004–2006	Showcase
Nanny and the Professor	1970–1971	ABC
Nathan Barley	2005	Channel 4
Ned's Declassified School Survival Guide	2004–2007	Nickelodeon
The Neighbors	2012–2014	ABC
Never Better	2008	BBC Two
New Girl	2011–2018	Fox
The New Normal	2012–13	NBC
Newsreaders	2013–2015	Adult Swim
The Newsroom	1996–2005	CBC
Nightcap	2016–2017	Pop
Nickelodeon's Spyders	2020-2022	Nickelodeon/TeenNick
No Heroics	2008	ITV2
No Activity	2015-2018	Stan
No Activity: USA	2017-2021	Paramount+
No Activity: Arabia	2021-2022	OSN/OSN Yahala Bil Arabi
No Activity: Japan	2021	Amazon Prime Video
No Activity: Italy	2024	Amazon Prime Video
No Activity: Spain	2021	HBO Max
No Activity: Belgium	2020	Streamz
Nobodies	2017–2018	TV Land
Northern Exposure	1990–1995	CBS
Not Dead Yet	2023–2024	ABC
Notes from the Underbelly	2007–2008	ABC
The Nutt House	1989	NBC

== O ==
Title	Years aired	Network
Occasional Wife	1966–1967	NBC
The Odd Couple (first season)	1970–1971	ABC
Off the Hook	2009	BBC Three
The Office	2001–2003	BBC Two/BBC One
The Office	2005–2013	NBC
The O'Keefes	2003	The WB
Oliver Beene	2003–2004	Fox
On the Air	1992	ABC
Onion News Network	2011	IFC
Onion SportsDome	2011	Comedy Central
Operation Good Guys	1997–2000	BBC Two
Overlord and the Underwoods	2021-2022	CBC Gem/Nickelodeon UK
Outnumbered	2007–2016	BBC One
Outsourced	2010–2011	NBC

== P ==
Title	Years aired	Network
Parenthood	1990–1991	NBC
Parents	2012	Sky1
Parker Lewis Can't Lose	1990–1993	Fox
Parks and Recreation	2009–2015	NBC
The Partridge Family	1970–1974	ABC
Party Down	2009–2010; 2023	Starz
The Patty Duke Show	1963–1966	ABC
The Paul Reiser Show	2011	NBC
Peep Show	2003–2015	Channel 4
People of Earth	2016–2017	TBS
Perfect Couples	2011	NBC
Pete and Gladys	1960–1962	CBS
Pete versus Life	2010–2011	Channel 4
Peter Kay's Phoenix Nights	2001–2002	Channel 4
Petticoat Junction	1963–1970	CBS
Phil of the Future	2004–2006	Disney Channel
PhoneShop	2010–2013	E4
Players	2010	Spike
Police Squad!	1982	ABC
Popular	1999–2001	The WB
Popularity Papers	2023-2024	YTV/Nickelodeon
Portlandia	2011–2018	IFC
Pound Puppies	1986–1987	ABC
Powerless	2017	NBC
Pramface	2012–2014	BBC Three
Private Benjamin	1981–1983	CBS
Pulling	2006–2009	BBC Three

== Q ==
Title	Years aired	Network
Quark	1977–1978	NBC

== R ==
Title	Years aired	Network
Raising Hope	2010–2014	Fox
Ramzor	2008–2014	Channel 2
Real Husbands of Hollywood	2013–2016	BET
The Real O'Neals	2016–2017	ABC
The Real McCoys	1957–1963	ABC/CBS
Red Dwarf (seventh and ninth seasons)	1997–2009	BBC Two/Dave
Remember WENN	1996–1998	AMC
Reno 911!	2003–2009	Comedy Central
Rev.	2010–2014	BBC Two
The Really Loud House	2022–2024	Nickelodeon
The Robinsons	2005	BBC Two
Robson Arms	2005–2008	CTV
Roman's Empire	2007	BBC Two
Romeo! (second season and after)	2003–2006	Nickelodeon
Roger & Val Have Just Got In	2010–2012	BBC Two
Roll Out	1973–1974	CBS
Room 222	1969–1974	ABC
The Royle Family	1998–2012	BBC Two/BBC One
Rude Awakening	1998–2001	Showtime
Running Wilde	2010	Fox

== S ==
Title	Years aired	Network
Sabrina the Teenage Witch	1996–2003	ABC, The WB
Samantha Who?	2007–2009	ABC
The San Pedro Beach Bums	1977	ABC
The Santa Clarita Diet	2017–2019	Netflix
Saturdays	2023	Disney Channel
The Sausage Factory	2001	The Comedy Network
Save Me	2013	NBC
Schitt's Creek	2015–2020	CBC
Schooled	2019–2020	ABC
Scrubs	2001–2010; 2026–	NBC/ABC
Search Party	2016–2022	TBS/HBO Max
The Second Hundred Years	1967–1968	ABC
Secret Girlfriend	2009	Comedy Central
The Secret World of Alex Mack	1994–1998	Nickelodeon
Seed	2013–2014	City
Sex and the City	1998–2004	HBO
Shasta McNasty	1999–2000	UPN
Show Me Yours	2004–2005	Showcase
Significant Others	2004	Bravo
Silicon Valley	2014–2019	HBO
Single Parents	2018–2020	ABC
The Slap Maxwell Story	1987–1988	ABC
Sledge Hammer!	1986–1988	ABC
The Smoking Room	2004–2005	BBC Three
The Smothers Brothers Show	1965–1966	CBS
Snuff Box	2006	BBC Three
So NoTORIous	2005–2006	VH1
Son of the Beach	2000–2002	FX
Son of Zorn	2016–2017	Fox
Sons & Daughters	2006	ABC
Sons of Tucson	2010	Fox
Sophie	2008–2009	CBC
South Central	1994	Fox
Spaced	1999–2001	Channel 4
Speechless	2016–2019	ABC
Splitting Up Together	2018–2019	ABC
Sports Night	1998–2000	ABC
Spy	2011–2012	Sky1
Square Pegs	1982–1983	CBS
St. Denis Medical	2024–	NBC
Starved	2005	FX
State of Grace	2001–2002	ABC Family
Stella	2005	Comedy Central
The Strange Calls	2012	ABC2
The Strangerers	2000	Sky1
Strangers with Candy	1999–2000	Comedy Central
Strip Mall	2000–2001	Comedy Central
Stromberg	2004–2012	ProSieben
The Stu Erwin Show	1950–1955	ABC
Stuck in the Middle	2016–2018	Disney Channel
Stumble	2025–2026	NBC
Suburban Shootout	2006–2007	Channel 5
Suburgatory	2011–2014	ABC
Summer Heights High	2007	ABC1
Sunnyside	2019	NBC
Superstore	2015–2021	NBC
Super City	2011–2013	TV3
Super Dave's Spike-Tacular	2009	Spike
Super Fun Night	2013–2014	ABC
Supah Ninjas	2011–2013	Nickelodeon

== T ==
Title	Years aired	Network
Tabitha	1976–1978	ABC
Teachers	2016–2019	TV Land
Temperatures Rising	1972–1974	ABC
Tenacious D	1997–2000	HBO
Testees	2008	Showcase
That Girl	1966–1971	ABC
The Thick of It	2005–2012	BBC Four/BBC Two
This is Jinsy	2010–2014	Sky Atlantic
Threesome	2011–2012	Comedy Central UK
The Tick	2001–2002	Fox
Till Death...	1981	ITV1
Todd and the Book of Pure Evil	2010–2012	Space
Topper	1953–1955	CBS
Tracey Ullman's State of the Union	2008–2010	Showtime
Traffic Light	2011	Fox
Trailer Park Boys	2001–2007, 2014–2018	Showcase/Netflix
Trial & Error	2017–2018	NBC
Trollied	2011–2018	Sky1
The Trip	2010–	BBC Two
The Troop	2009–2013	Nickelodeon
Tucker	2000–2001	NBC
Twenty Twelve	2011–2012	BBC Four/BBC Two
Twitch City	1998–2000	CBC

== U ==
Title	Years aired	Network
The Ugliest Girl in Town	1968–1969	ABC
Uncle Buck	2016	ABC
Undeclared	2001–2002	Fox
Unfabulous	2004–2007	Nickelodeon
Unhitched	2008	Fox
Up All Night	2011–2012	NBC
Unbreakable Kimmy Schmidt	2015–2019	Netflix
The Unicorn	2019–2021	CBS
Ultra Violet & Black Scorpion	2022	Disney Channel
Unscripted	2005	HBO
Upright Citizens Brigade	1998–2000	Comedy Central
United States	1980	NBC
United States of Tara	2009–2011	Showtime

== V ==
Title	Years aired	Network
Veep	2012–2019	HBO
Very Small Business	2008	ABC1
Viva S Club	2002	ABC Family

== W ==
Title	Years aired	Network
The War Next Door	2000	USA
Warren the Ape	2010	MTV
Watching Ellie (first season)	2002 (Season 1)	NBC
Way to Go	2013	BBC Three
Web Therapy	2011–2015	Showtime
Weeds	2005–2012	Showtime
The Weird Al Show	1997	CBS
Weird Loners	2015	Fox
Welcome to Flatch	2022–2023	Fox
Welcome to The Captain	2008	CBS
Welcome to the Family	2013	NBC
White Van Man	2011–2012	BBC Three
Whites	2010	BBC Two
Wilfred	2007–2010	SBS One
Wilfred	2011–2014	FX
Wish You Were Here	1990	CBS
The Wonder Years	1988–1993	ABC
Workaholics	2011–2017	Comedy Central
Worst Week	2008–2009	CBS
The Worst Week of My Life	2004–2006	BBC One
Wrecked	2016–2018	TBS

== Y ==
Title	Years aired	Network
The Yard	2011	HBO Canada
You're the Worst	2014–2019	FX/FXX
Young Sheldon	2017–2024	CBS

== Z ==
Title	Years aired	Network
Z Rock	2008–2009	IFC
Zach Stone Is Gonna Be Famous	2013	MTV
Zeke and Luther	2009–2012	Disney XD
Zoey 101	2005–2008	Nickelodeon

== See also ==
- List of sitcoms
- Laugh track
- List of comedy television series
- Must See TV
- Single-camera setup

== Bibliography ==
- Situation Comedy Bibliography (via UC Berkeley)
