= Wanasah =

Defunct Saudi Arabian television channel (2007-2026)

Wanasah وناسة
- Type: Satellite television
- Country: Saudi Arabia
- Broadcast area: Middle East and North Africa (main audience free-to-air); Horn of Africa (peripheral free-to-air via satellite)
- Headquarters: Riyadh, Saudi Arabia

Programming
- Language: Arabic
- Picture format: 1080i (HDTV); 576i (SDTV)

Ownership
- Owner: Rashed Al-Majed
- Sister channels: Al Arabiya Al Hadath MBC 1 MBC 2 MBC 3 MBC 4 MBC Persia MBC Action MBC Drama MBC Max MBC 5 MBC Bollywood MBC Masr MBC Masr 2 MBC Masr Drama MBC Iraq

History
- Launched: July 3, 2007; 19 years ago
- Closed: May 31, 2026; 5 months ago
- Replaced by: MBC Mood

Availability

Streaming media
- MBC Shahid: Watch Online (HD)

Wanasah (Arabic: وناسة) (transl. Joy) was a free-to-air Saudi Arabian music and variety television channel. It is operated by the MBC Group and owned by the Saudi singer Rashed Al-Majed. The channel broadcasts in the Arabic language and is available across the Middle East and North Africa and the Horn of Africa via the Badr-4 and Nilesat 102 satellites. Launched on 3 July 2007 with a live broadcast concert, Wanasah primarily targets young audiences.

On 31 May 2026, Wanasah TV was shut down and replaced by MBC Mood, which launched the following day, 1 June.

== See also ==
- Music of Saudi Arabia
- Television in Saudi Arabia
