= MBC Masr =

Saudi Arabian television channel launched in 2012

- Type: Satellite television
- Country: Egypt; Saudi Arabia
- Broadcast area: Middle East and North Africa (main audience free-to-air); Horn of Africa (peripheral free-to-air via satellite)
- Headquarters: Cairo, Egypt

Programming
- Language: Arabic
- Picture format: 1080i (HDTV); 576i (SDTV)

Ownership
- Owner: MBC Group
- Sister channels: Al Arabiya Al Hadath Wanasah MBC 1 MBC 2 MBC 3 MBC 4 MBC 5 MBC Persia MBC Action MBC Drama MBC Max MBC Bollywood MBC Masr 2 MBC Masr Drama MBC Iraq

History
- Launched: 9 November 2012; 13 years ago

Availability

Streaming media
- MBC Shahid: Watch Online (HD)
- YouTube: Official YouTube channel

MBC Masr (Arabic: إم بي سي مصر) is a Saudi Arabian free-to-air television channel based in Egypt and owned by the MBC Group. It primarily targets Egyptian audiences and produces local shows and programs, alongside broadcasting acquired regional and international content.

== History ==
A ceremony was held in Cairo on 16 October 2012 to mark the channel’s establishment. The channel was officially launched on 9 November 2012 to serve Egyptian audiences. In subsequent years, sister channels MBC Masr 2 and MBC Masr Drama were introduced. The name Masr reflects the Arabic pronunciation of “Egypt".

== See also ==
- Cinema of Egypt
- Television in Egypt
- Cinema of Saudi Arabia
- Television in Saudi Arabia
