= Rashash (TV series) =

2021 Saudi Arabian televised crime drama

- رشاش
- Written by: Tony Jordan
- Directed by: Colin Teague
- Country of origin: Saudi Arabia
- Original language: Arabic
- No. of seasons: 1
- No. of episodes: 8

Production
- Production company: MBC Studios

Original release
- Network: Shahid; MBC 1
- Release: 9 July 2021

Rashash (Arabic: رشاش) is an eight-part Saudi Arabian drama series written by Tony Jordan, Sheikha Suha Al Khalifa and Richard Bellamy and directed by Colin Teague. The series follows the true-life story of Rashash Al-Otaibi, a Saudi bandit, drug trafficker and murderer who terrorized the local population in the 1970s and 1980s.

The multi-million dollar crime-thriller production was shot partly in Saudi Arabia and partly in Abu Dhabi and features an all-Saudi cast in the lead roles. The script tapped exclusive material Saudi state archives on the real Rashash's "long-running criminal investigation from the late 1980s.”

It was streamed on Shahid VIP with one episode per week of about an hour, starting from July 9, 2021.

== Cast ==
- Naif Aldaferi As Fahad
- Ayman Mutahar As Musleh
- Yagoub Alfarhan As Rashash
- Khaled Yeslam As Chief Azam
- Sumaya Rida As Ayda
- Hassan Assiri
- Mohammed Alqass As Bader
- Madam Alzghoul
- Saif Alhaq As Fawaz
- Fayez Bin Jurays As Omar
- Saud Al-Shammari As Yousif
- Yousif Boulos As Drug Dealer
- Hakeem Jomah As Sultan
- Mouhannad Huthail As AbdulRahim
- Ibrahim Al-Hajjaj As Qahas
- Aziz Gharbawi As Ali
- Albaraa Reda As Tariq
- Abdulaziz Al-Khumais As Ghalib
- Abdullah Bin Haider As The Tribe Leader
- Mosbah Fezzai As Hotel Owner
- Faisal Al-Dokhei As Kayed
- Majed Al-Zubaidi As Police Patrol
- Julia Chaouachi As Maha
- Ahmad Al-Saeedas As Munther
