= Ala Al Hilwa Wa Al Morra =

2021 Syrian television series

- Also known as: A Sweet And Bitter
- Genre: Romantic drama
- Based on: İyi Günde Kötü Günde
- Written by: Lubna Mashallah; Mai Hayek
- Directed by: Rami Hanna
- Starring: Dana Mardini; Nicolas Mouawad; Pamela El Kik; Joe Trad; Salma El Masry; Ahmad Alahmad; Muhammed Kheir Jarrah; Nour Ali
- Opening theme: "3al helwe w 3al morra" by Joseph Attieh
- Country of origin: Arabia
- Original language: Arabic
- No. of seasons: 1
- No. of episodes: 58

Production
- Camera setup: Multi-camera
- Running time: 45 minutes
- Production companies: MBC Studios; O3 Medya

Original release
- Network: MBC 1 MBC Iraq
- Release: 29 August – 16 November 2021

Ala Al Hilwa Wa Al Morra (Arabic: على الحلوة والمرة), alternatively captioned as A Sweet And Bitter, is a Lebanese romantic drama television series based on adaptation of Turkish drama series İyi Günde Kötü Günde. Produced by MBC Studios and O3 Medya, it stars with Dana Mardini, Nicolas Mouawad, Pamela El Kik and Joe Trade as main characters. The story revolved around Farah, a wedding planner, was abandoned during wedding ceremony by her fiancé Rayan, and he returned five years later. Rayan reprehensibly married to another woman called Lana. In the relationship, he begins a hesitant approach to Farah in order to win her back. The series was aired on MBC 1 and MBC Iraq at 10pm KSA from 29 August to 16 November 2021. Episodes were directly released at Shahid VIP streaming service.

== Synopsis ==
Farah (Dana Mardini) devastated after crucial wedding ceremony while she prepared to marry Rayan (Nicolas Mouawad), who spontaneously left the event due to conflict with her father. He returned after five years and married to another woman called Lana (Pamela El Kik). This, however, leads more to struggle to win Farah back, when she engaged with Wissem (Joe Trad). Lana secretly have affair with other man, Rayan didn't notice her connection. Lana and Rayan reluctantly set wedding ceremony, but abrupted by a scuffle between Lana's actual father and her mother newly engaged fiancé in the ceremony.

Rayan faces more confrontation to Wissem, who later became psychotic. In the remaining episode, Wissem kidnapped Farah and relocated her to different houses as a result of police searching. In the final scene, Wissem hands over Farah to Rayan.

== Series overview ==
Season	Еpisodes	Originally aired	
Season	Еpisodes	First aired	Last aired
1	58	29 August 2021	16 November 2021

== Cast and characters ==
Actor/esses	Characters
Dana Mardini	Farah
Nicolas Mouawad	Rayan
Pamela El Kik	Lana
Joe Trad	Wissem
Salma El Masry	Sherihan
Ahmad Alahmad	Farouk
Muhammed Kheir Jarrah	Salah
Nour Ali	Aya
Carmen Lebbos	Asma
Zeina Ziada	Noha
Hadi Bou Ayash	Taim
Joanna Toubia	Sawsan
Ghaith Baraka	Adam
Cherine El Hajj	Sahar
Jean Kassis	Hekmat
Jamal Hamdan	
	Majd
