= Turki Aldakhil =

Saudi journalist and diplomat

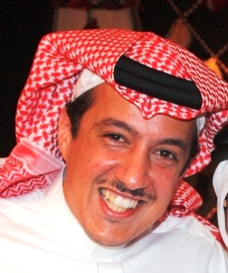
- Born: Turki Bin Abdullah Aldakhil; 2 July 1973 (age 53); Riyadh, Kingdom of Saudi Arabia
- Occupations: Saudi ambassador to the UAE Aide to Crown Prince Mohammad bin Salman and Former General Manager of Al Arabiya News Channel
- Years active: 1989–present
- Children: 3

Turki bin Abdullah Aldakhil (born 2 July 1973) is a Saudi diplomat and journalist, and the current Saudi ambassador to the United Arab Emirates. He is the former general manager of Al Arabiya Television News Network in Dubai, the owner of Al Mesbar Studies and Research Centre and Madarek Publishing House in Dubai, and was previously a political correspondent for Radio MBC FM in Dubai and Radio Monte Carlo in Saudi Arabia. In February 2019, Al-Dakheel took the oath to become ambassador to the United Arab Emirates (UAE).

== Education ==
Aldakhil studied at Imam Muhammad ibn Saud Islamic University, in Saudi Arabia. He subsequently got an MSc degree from Makased University in Beirut, Lebanon.

== Work experience ==
Aldakhil's career in journalism began in 1989. As a media specialist, he is known throughout the region and world as a TV anchor for Al-Arabiya News Channel's award-winning talk-show Edaat (Arabic: إضاءات), and as a regular contributor to a number of leading newspapers.

Aldakhil's work has appeared in a variety of publications, including Al-Riyadh, Okaz, Asharq Al-Awsat, Al Majalla, Al-Muslimun, 'Alim Al-Riyadh, and Majalla Al-Jeel. He also worked full-time as the Saudi Politics editor for Al-Hayat.

From 1997 to 1998, Aldakhil worked as a political correspondent for Radio Monte Carlo in Saudi Arabia. In 1999, he worked as a political correspondent for MBC FM. In 2003, he joined MBC, and then Al-Arabiya in that same year.

Aldakhil contributed to the establishment of the UK-based Elaph Arabic-language news portal as well as to the Al-Arabiya channel and its website, where he worked as general site administrator until 2007.

He has written numerous books. Notable among them is Memoirs of a Previously Obese Man (Arabic: ذكريات سمين سابق ), which chronicles his struggle to lose weight.

On 31 January 2015, MBC Group's chairman Sheikh Waleed Al-Ibrahim announced the appointment of Turki Aldakhil as the new general manager of Al Arabiya News Channel. Aldakhil left his job at Al Arabiya in January 2019, reportedly in preparation to become the next Saudi ambassador to the United Arab Emirates.

== Awards ==
In 2007, 2010 and 2011, Arabian Business magazine named Aldakhil among the most influential Arab figures. In November 2012, it ranked him 29th of the world's 100 most powerful Saudis.

In 2014, Aldakhil received the America Abroad Media annual award for his role in supporting civil society and human rights and advancing women's role in society in Saudi Arabia and the Persian Gulf region.
