= Wanasa =

Wanasa may refer to:

- Wanasah, a free-to-air satellite TV channel
- Wanassa, a title in ancient Greek, sometimes translated as "queen"
