= MBC Iraq =

Saudi Arabian television channel launched in 2019

- Type: Satellite television
- Country: Saudi Arabia
- Broadcast area: Middle East and North Africa (main audience free-to-air); Horn of Africa (peripheral free-to-air via satellite)
- Headquarters: Riyadh, Saudi Arabia

Programming
- Language: Arabic
- Picture format: 1080i (HDTV); 576i (SDTV)

Ownership
- Owner: MBC Group
- Sister channels: Al Arabiya Al Hadath Wanasah MBC 1 MBC 2 MBC 3 MBC 4 MBC 5 MBC Persia MBC Action MBC Drama MBC Max MBC Bollywood MBC Masr MBC Masr 2 MBC Masr Drama

History
- Launched: 17 February 2019; 7 years ago

Availability

Streaming media
- MBC Shahid: Watch Online (HD)
- YouTube: Official YouTube channel

MBC Iraq (Arabic: إم بي سي العراق) is a Saudi Arabian free-to-air television channel owned by the MBC Group. It targets Iraqi audiences and produces original Iraqi programs through MBC Studios, alongside broadcasting imported content.

== History ==
MBC Iraq was launched on 17 February 2019 by the Saudi-owned MBC Group as a family-oriented television channel targeting Iraqi audiences.

On 19 October 2024, MBC's offices in Baghdad were damaged during protests following the broadcast of a report that described Palestinian militants as "terrorists." Approximately 400 to 500 people were reported to have vandalized the premises, damaged equipment, and started fires before police intervened. In response, an Iraqi lawmaker criticized the broadcast and announced plans to pursue the revocation of MBC's broadcasting license in Iraq.

== Programming ==
- Ala Al Hilwa Wa Al Morra
- Ramez Movie Star
- Bab Al-Hara
- Ramez Wakel el-Gaw
- Um Harun
- Kalabsh
- Kalabsh season 2
- Trending
- The Boxing Girls
- Boxing Girls
- The Voice Senior
- Top Chef
- Al Kabeer
- Iraq Idol
- Saudi Idol
- The Shock
- Saraya Abdeen
- Al Thaman
- Kingdoms of Fire
- The Godfather: Club of the East
- Omar
- Al Hayba
- Sarah
- Ferqat Naji Atallah
- Raqam Majhool
- Keid Al Nesa
- Ahl al-Gharām
- Aswār
- Banat Al Molakama
- Gārī Yā Hammūda
- Khams Khawāt
- Stiletto
- Heera
- Arabs Got Talent
- Million Pound Menu Egypt
- Million Pound Menu Masr
- Shark Tank Egypt
- Beirut City
- Shark Tank Masr
- Samra
- So'alna wa Jawab
- Action Ma' Waleed
- Eish El Dor
- Ma3ak Khabar
- MBC Driven
- Action Ya Eyal
- Lesh La'a? (Why Not?)
- Driven
- Masrah Masr (Egypt Theater)
- The Voice
- The Voice Kids
- Power Rangers Super Megaforce (dubbed in Arabic)
- Little Big Stars (نجوم صغار; Nogoum Sghar)
- The Voice Kids (أحلى صوت; Ahla Sawt; Best Voice)
- Forsan Alqaseed (فرسان القصيد)
- Little Big Shots
- Little Big News (أخبار نجوم صغار; Akhbar Nogoum Sghar)
- Amina Haf
- Tash ma Tash
- The Masked Singer
- Iraq Idol

=== Play ===
- Aleial kaburat
- Bani Samet
- Bay bay landan
- Fananees
- The School of the Misfits

== Channel Frequency ==
- Eutelsat 7 West A 11219 H 27500 3/4 HD & SD (MENA Only)
- Badr 8 11862 V 27500 3/4 HD & SD (MENA Only)
- Nilesat 201 11938 V 27500 5/6 SD (MENA Only) From 2019 - 2021
- Nilesat 201 12226 H 27500 5/6 HD (MENA Only) From 2019 - 2021
- Eutelsat 7 West A 11315 V 27500 HD & SD Auto (MENA Only) From 2021 - 2025
- Eutelsat 7 West A 12467 H 27500 HD & SD 3/4 (MENA Only) From February 20 - 25
- Eutelsat 7 West A 12467 H 30000 HD & SD 2/3 (MENA Only) From February 26 - End of Eid Al Fitr
