= MBC Bollywood =

Saudi Arabian television channel launched in 2013

- Type: Satellite television
- Country: Saudi Arabia
- Broadcast area: Middle East and North Africa (main audience free-to-air); Afghanistan; Bangladesh; Horn of Africa (peripheral free-to-air via satellite)
- Headquarters: Riyadh, Saudi Arabia

Programming
- Languages: English; Hindi; Arabic
- Picture format: 1080i (HDTV) (downscaled to 16:9 576i for the SDTV feed)

Ownership
- Owner: MBC Group
- Sister channels: Al Arabiya Al Hadath Wanasah MBC 1 MBC 2 MBC 3 MBC 4 MBC 5 MBC Persia MBC Action MBC Drama MBC Max MBC Masr MBC Masr 2 MBC Masr Drama MBC Iraq

History
- Launched: 26 October 2013; 13 years ago

Availability

Streaming media
- MBC Shahid: Watch Online (HD)
- YouTube: Official YouTube channel

MBC Bollywood (Arabic: إم بي سي بوليود) is a Saudi Arabian free-to-air television channel owned by the MBC Group. It broadcasts mainly Bollywood dramas and films in Arabic through dubbing and subtitles, and occasionally airs Pakistani dramas. The channel was launched on 26 October 2013 by Kareena Kapoor.

== Programming ==
=== Indian series ===
Dubbing of all Indian series is in Arabic.

- Aashiqana
- Madhubala – Ek Ishq Ek Junoon
- Bade Achhe Lagte Hain 2
- Bahu Bagum
- Beintehaa
- Bepannah
- Beyhadh
- Beyhadh 2
- Chittod Ki Rani Padmini Ka Johur
- Dangerous
- Dil Hi Toh Hai
- Dil Toh Happy Hai Ji
- Ek Deewaana Tha
- Ek Hasina Thi
- Ek Bhram Sarvagun Sampanna
- Ek Duje Ke Vaaste
- Farah Ki Dawat
- Gathbandhan
- Ghum Hai Kisikey Pyaar Meiin
- The Great Indian Global Kitchen
- The Great Indian Murder
- Hawas Maya
- Ishk Par Zor Nahi
- Ishq Mein Marjawan
- Ishq Mein Marjawan 2
- Ishqbaaaz
- Iss Pyaar Ko Kya Naam Doon?
- Iss Pyaar Ko Kya Naam Doon 3
- Iss Pyaar Ko Kya Naam Doon? Ek Baar Phir
- Jaana Na Dil Se Door
- Jeevan Saathi
- Jhalak Dikhhla Jaa
- Jhalak Dikhhla Jaa Reloaded
- Kahaan Hum Kahaan Tum
- Kasam Tere Pyaar Ki
- Kasauti Zindagi Kay
- Kasautii Zindagii Kay 2
- Kuch Rang Pyar Ke Aise Bhi
- Kitani Mohabbat Hai
- Mahi Way
- Mehndi Hai Rachne Waali
- Namak Issk Ka
- The Night Manager
- Rishta.com
- Parineetii
- Saraswatichandra
- Sanjivani
- Sanjivani 2
- Seher – Hone Ko Hai
- Silsila Badalte Rishton Ka
- Silsila Pyaar Ka
- Tu Aashiqui
- Tere Liye
- Udaariyaan
- Yadi Bi Yadi
- Yeh Hai Chahatein
- Yeh Rishta Kya Kehlata Hai
- Yeh Rishtey Hain Pyaar Ke
- Yehh Jadu Hai Jinn Ka!
- Zindagi Ka Har Rang...Gulaal
- Fanna ishq main marjawan 3
- Raisinghani VS Raisinghani

=== Indian entertainment ===
Subtitling of all programs are in Arabic and Hindi.

- Band Baajaa Bride
- BFF's Couch
- BFF's with Vogue
- Bollywood's Most Desirables
- Bollywood Shuffle
- Bollywood Café
- Bollyworld
- Breakfast To Dinner
- Get The Look
- IIFA Buzz
- The Love Laugh Live Show
- My Yellow Table
- Style Addict
- This is My Story
- Beauty Pulse
- Citruss TV
- Home Shopping
- Abu - Ahwak (Al Anisa Farah)
- Ramage - Ya Lil (Al Anisa Farah)
- Scoop with Raya

=== Indian talk shows ===
Subtitling of all Indian talk shows is in Arabic.

- The Anupam Kher Show – Kucch Bhi Ho Sakta Hai
- Koffee with Karan
- Simi Selects India's Most Desirable

=== Pakistani ===
Subtitles of all Pakistani series are in Arabic and Urdu.

- Aisi Hai Tanhai
- Balaa
- Bay Dardi
- Cheekh
- Dil-e-Muztar
- Dil Lagi
- Dushman e Jaan
- Gul-o-Gulzar
- Humsafar
- Ishq Tamasha
- Ishqiya
- Kadoorat
- Kaisa Hai Naseeban
- Khaani
- Koi Chand Rakh
- Maat
- Mata-e-Jaan Hai Tu
- Mera Naseeb
- Meray Qatil Meray Dildar
- Malaal
- Mere Paas Tum Ho
- Suno Chanda
- Suno Chanda 2
- Yeh Dil Mera
- Qurban
- Zindagi Gulzar Hai
- Pehli Si Muhabbat
- Ishq Hai
- Kabhi Main Kabhi Tum

== Special events ==
- Bollywood Fashion Week
- Bollywood Fashion Week Winter Fest
- Filmfare Awards
- IIFA Awards

== Films ==
Subtitling of all Indian movies is in Arabic.

- Dhoom
- Dhoom 2
- Dhoom 3
- Main Hoon Na
- Kuch Kuch Hota Hai
- Om Shanti Om
- Goliyon Ki Raasleela Ram-Leela
- Happy New Year
- Bajrangi Bhaijaan
- Fan
- Ta Ra Rum Pum
- Chennai Express
- Commando
- Commando 2
- Commando 3
- Bharat
- Veer
- Veere Di Wedding
- Tanu Weds Manu
- Tanu Weds Manu Returns
- RRR
- Chef
- Housefull
- Housefull 2
- Housefull 3
- Housefull 4
- Bala
- Baazigar
- Satyameva Jayate
- Satyameva Jayate 2
- Jannat
- Jannat 2
- Haan Maine Bhi Pyaar Kiya
- Rang De Basanti
- Ra.One
- Shubh Mangal Saavdhan
- Dangal
- Cirkus
- Double Dhamaal
- Total Dhamaal
- Baaghi
- Baaghi 2
- Baaghi 3
- Dilwale
- Dilwale Dulhania Le Jayenge
- Attack
- A Thursday
- Malang
- Sooryavanshi
- Simmba
- 7 Din Mohabbat In
- Baaji
- Crew
- Mom
- The Lift Boy
- Neerja
- Padmaavat
- Parey Hut Love
- Dil To Pagal Hai
- Bajirao Mastani
- Dostana
- Chak De! India
- Jhoom Barabar Jhoom
- 102 Not Out
- Queen
- Parmanu: The Story of Pokhran
- Sultan
- Brothers
- Ek Villain
- Ek Villain Returns
- Deewangee
- Cocktail
- Vicky Donor
- English Vinglish
- 3 Idiots
- Ek Tha Tiger
- Boss
- No Problem
- I Hate Luv Storys
- Tere Naam
- Aisha
- A Flying Jatt
- Josh
- Mohabbatein
- Salaam Namaste
- Jab Tak Hai Jaan
- Jab Harry Met Sejal
- Dabangg
- Dabangg 2
- Dabangg 3
- Brahmastra: Part One - Shiva
- Rashmi Rocket
- Satyaprem Ki Katha
- Rabba Main Kya Karoon
- Anjaana Anjaani
- Guru
- An Action Hero
- Ittefaq
- Bang Bang!
- Hum Tum
- Sardar Ka Grandson
- De De Pyaar De
- Baar Baar Dekho
- Selfiee
- The Lady Killer
- Anek
- Khandaani Shafakhana
- Badla
- Tu Jhoothi Main Makkaar
- Mumbai Saga
- Jagga Jasoos
- Race
- Race 2
- Race 3
- Heropanti
- Heropanti 2
- Munna Michael
- Roohi
- Bhool Bhulaiyaa
- Bhool Bhulaiyaa 2
- Mimi
- Trapped
- Ae Dil Hai Mushkil
- Gulabo Sitabo
- Krrish
- Krrish 3
- Paltan
- ABCD: Any Body Can Dance
- ABCD 2: Any Body Can Dance 2
- Jodhaa Akbar
- Made in China
- Taj Mahal: An Eternal Love Story
- Thugs of Hindostan
- Kabhi Khushi Kabhie Gham

== See also ==
- Cinema of Saudi Arabia
- Television in Saudi Arabia
