= Takki (web series) =

Saudi Arabian web series

- Country of origin: Saudi Arabia
- No. of episodes: 36

Original release
- Network: YouTube
- Release: February 21, 2012

Takki (Arabic: تكي) is a Saudi Arabian web series directed by Mohammad Makki. The series was premiered in February 2012. As no cable channel would run the show, it was uploaded exclusively on YouTube The show was recently bought by and is now being streamed on Netflix. The series has 3 seasons with a total of 36 episodes, each episode lasting between 10 and 20 minutes. UTURN Entertainment produced and distributed Takki Series in its network, making it one of their shows that are posted on their YouTube Channel.

The series targets Saudi Arabian youth by showing the daily lives of six young Saudi adults. In an interview with Arab News, Makki said, "We want to bring our culture to life and narrow the gap between the different backgrounds in Saudi Arabia, while showing Saudi society to the world. Broadcasting women wearing their hijab and praying. Highlighting Saudi youth problems and issues in goes of narrowing the gap between different mindsets. This provides an image of culture in a jovial way." This show aims to bend the societal rules that are present in Saudi Arabia. The series focuses on issues in Saudi society including: gender relations, family dynamics, friendship, poverty, racial tensions, and drug use.

== Episodes ==
- Episode 1

The series begins with the female character Bayan becoming engaged to Majed. As Bayan is waiting for her driver to pick her up, she is harassed by a group of young men asking her to drive with them. The main male character, Malek, then fights the group in the car and offers Bayan a ride; which she ultimately accepts. After this Malek meets his friends at their local hangout spot and explains how he gave a ride to a young woman he did not know. He received much criticism for this because of the conservative traditions in Saudi Arabia about young men and women interacting. Malek then runs into Majed, who turns out to be a good friend of his. He then realizes that Majed is engaged to Bayan.

- Episode 2

Both Malek and Bayan are receiving criticism for riding in the car together when they did not know each other. Majed begins to get suspicious of Bayan because he overheard a conversation between Bayan and another female about getting into a car with someone. Majed then finds the book that Malek lent to Bayan when she was in the car and realized who had given her the ride. A secondary plot arises in this episode where Malek and his group of friends begin filming a movie about a drug ring in Jeddah. The episode ends with Malek and Majed meeting at the hangout spot, where Majed is going to confront Malek about the ride he gave Bayan.

- Episode 3

The episode begins with Majed and Malek talking about the ride and book that Malek gave Bayan. Malek receives a call from his friends who are helping him film the movie and they tell him that members from the drug ring they were filming had captured them and want the tape. At this time Bayan's family has found out she received a ride from an unknown man through social media and her father yells at her for the inappropriate behavior. Malek meets his friends who are being held by members of the drug ring. He hands over a tape to them and his friends are released. However, Malek handed them a random tape and kept the actual footage. Once the members of the drug ring realized this they chased down Malek and his friends. The episode ended in a fight where Majed was stabbed.

- Episode 4

The episode begins with Malek and his friends driving to the hospital with a bleeding Majed in the backseat. They rush Majed into the emergency room where he is admitted quickly. The following scenes show Malek and his friends giving blood to help Majed. Malek then has a flashback of him and Majed arguing but stopping as soon as Bayan and her friend walk in. Right after in present time, Malek enters the elevator with Bayan and they get into an argument where Bayan throws the book that Malek gave her in the first episode. The episode ends with Malek's friends leaving after blaming Malek for injuring Majed while in the hospital and Majed wakes up after his surgery. (No English Subtitles)

- Episode 5

Malek's friends and Bayan are blaming Malek for what happened to Majed and not speaking to him. Malek asks his father for help with purchasing a new camera, but his father tells him how he wants him to stop trying to be a filmmaker and focus on his education. Majed is out of the hospital and recovering, but Bayan is becoming hesitant about her engagement with him. The episode ends with one of the Majed's friends, Ahmed, returning from abroad.

- Episode 6

Malek agrees to help a friend in the CPVPV by filming a short movie with them to bridge the gap between the youth and the CPVPV. Malek realizes that Ahmed is back from abroad and expresses his concerns to his friends about being around him because he has caused trouble in the past. Bayan and Majed work out their problems about Bayan receiving the ride and the recent scrutiny she has been receiving on social media. The episode ends with Majed's mother expressing her concerns about his engagement to Bayan due to her working alongside men and the comments made about her on social media.

- Episode 7

The episode begins with Bayan asking her father to allow her to shoot a commercial in Abu-Dhabi. Her father says no, saying he doesn't want to risk what happened last time. Next, Majed and his friends are eating dinner when Malek shows up asking to speak to Majed alone. Majed, still mad at Malek, grudgingly accepts. Malek expresses his dissatisfaction with Majed just accepting Ahmed back into the group because of all the trouble he caused in the past. Majed says he's changed, and then brings up Malek driving Bayan, showing clearly that he is still upset about that moment. Malek finally gets the chance to explain himself of what happened that day, and Majed accepts his apology. They return to their friends when they see the drug dealer and his gang show up and it looks like trouble. However, the gang leader says he came to thank them for not going to the police and gave Malek back his friend's camera that he stole. Malek is ecstatic and returns the camera back to his friend and then rents another to shoot his short film. Bayan at this time is enjoying lunch at a food court when numerous people come up to her and ask to take pictures with her. They say they enjoy her YouTube series and Bayan says her day is made. Finally, the episode ends when Malek's father finds out Malek is filming and comes to his scene and yells at him in front of his friends. Malek says he would rather live on the street than with his father and Malek's father slams his camera down, almost breaking it.

- Episode 8

Bayan enters a car and is greeted by her friend with a large stuffed animal. They talk and Bayan notices her friend has a bruise on her forearm. When she points it out her friend hides it and stops talking. Bader then calls Bayan's friend and while they are talking her friend has to hang up because a man comes in screaming. Bader then goes to his friend's restaurant to try out his food (his friend just got hired as a chef). The episode then goes back to Bayan and it shows her waiting on the street for a cab with a cake. While she's waiting, the same yellow Hummer pulls up from the first episode and the guy proceeds to hit on her again. She walks away and gets into a cab, but the guys in the Hummer follow her. The driver attempts to get away from the bad guys but his car breaks down as the Hummer pulls up behind them. The driver gets out to protect Bayan, but forgets that he didn't put the car in park and it proceeds to start rolling down a hill with Bayan still in the back seat. Bayan frantically pulls the emergency brake before she crashes as the driver is chasing her down the hill. The episode ends with Bayan going to dinner with Majed to celebrate his birthday but they get in a big argument about Majed saying Bayan must choose him or her YouTube series and career. (No English Subtitles)

- Episode 9

Malek and his friends are at a wedding and Malek's friends are worried that Malek and Majed are too upset. Malek is upset because his dad doesn't support his filming career and Majed is upset because his parents made him give Bayan an ultimatum: either he or her career and she chose her career. They finally start to have a good time at the wedding after one of Malek's friends makes a fool of himself in front of everyone. The episode continues with Bayan and her friends sitting on her bed talking about how famous Bayan is going to become once she goes to Abu-Dhabi. They then start to complain about how it is unfair that females can either choose to work on their careers or get married, not both. It is clear that Bayan still has feelings for Majed in this scene. Next, Malek, Majed, and his friends are driving around in a car just having a good time before they pull over to stop for food. Malek and Majed have a heart-to-heart conversation about where they think their lives are going next which is a good sign to their friends since they were fighting for a long time. The episode ends with Malek giving his friend a film.

- Episode 10

Malek goes to his friend Ali's house to return his camera. There, Ali offers Malek the director position in Abu-Dhabi for a new commercial. Malek is ecstatic until he finds out that Bayan is the star of the commercial. He brings it up to his friends at lunch and one of them says that he shouldn't go, and the other says that he should go but only if Majed approves. So, Malek goes to Majed's house and asks him if he would be alright if he shot the commercial. Majed said that he can't hold back Malek's career aspirations for an ex-fiancé, and tells Malek to go ahead. Malek is happy that he now has Majed's blessing to shoot the commercial and returns to his friends to tell them the news. The next scene shows Bayan crying because she feels like a bad person since everyone she likes ends up leaving her. Her cousins cheer her up and then her father drives her to the airport. Ali meets them there and tells Bayan that they are just waiting on the rest of their party before they can board. This is when Bayan notices that Malek and his friend are coming along, which gives Bayan an uneasy feeling. To top it off, Majed shows up as well, seemingly because Ahmed convinced him that something may happen between Malek and Bayan while they were away. When Majed showed up, Malek and him stared at each other, not saying a word.

- Episode 11

Bayan is shown angry at Ali for inviting Majed along on their journey as it is very awkward between them now. Ali states that he brought him along because he was short on crew and didn't want to spend a lot on hiring a professional. Malek too, is shown a little angry that Majed is coming along. However, it is only because Ali hired him as assistant director and Malek feels like he doesn't need one. Abdullah (Majed's friend) is trying to keep the air light, but it is obvious between them that this trip is not going to be pleasant. They all get on the plane and land in Abu-Dhabi and move into their hotel. Abdullah loves the luxurious hotel room, and in one of the shows funnier moments is seen shouting "Whoa!" throughout the room. Malek receives a call from Ali saying they need to leave to go to dinner with Mr. Rashid (probably the investor of this project). This is when the crew meets Nayla, a friend of Mr. Rashid. Nayla drives her own car which is astounding to all the Saudi's, but she says that her father taught her so she doesn't have to rely on a man. They all attend dinner and it is clear that Abdullah is attracted to Nayla, as he is shown flirting with her throughout the dinner. Mr. Rashid makes nice comments about Malek and Bayan and then starts to talk about social media and saying how important he thinks it has become. Majed jumps in and states that he thinks social media can be a problem because the people in the world often lose sight of their personal life, which is a clear attack on Bayan. Malek cuts off Majed and supports social media, citing Bayan's first YouTube episode about how young people make mistakes and learn from them. After dinner, Majed and Bayan get into a fight about why Majed is here, and it is clear that Majed is jealous about the potential relationship that Bayan and Malek may develop. Bayan storms out, and Majed goes back to the hotel room. The episode ends by having Majed tell Malek that he doesn't want him to film Bayan in the commercial.

- Episode 12

Majed tells Malek that if he films Bayan their friendship will be over. Malek tells him that he is here strictly for business and that Majed is getting in his way by making this a big deal. Still, Majed urges Malek to not film Bayan, but Malek ignores him and walks out the door to start the filming process. Malek starts the process with Bayan talking on a couch. After filming, they are all in the parking lot and Nayla is teaching Bayan how to drive. Bayan isn't very good and ends up hitting Malek, injuring his shoulder. Abdullah comes to his aid and says "This is exactly why we don't let women drive in Saudi!" which doesn't do him any good in his pursuit of Nayla. However, they all forgive each other and the 4 of them go on an adventure around Abu-Dhabi. While they are eating dinner they decide to attend a movie, but Nayla says she is tired and just wants to go home. Right before she leaves, Abdullah makes up a song about how he wants to propose to her, and then after she leaves he leaves as well. This leaves just Bayan and Malek. They go to the movie together but are distant from each other because they know the situation with Majed. But, after the movie, they can't keep up this act and start talking to each other and having a good time. When they arrive back at the hotel Majed sees them walk in together, most likely angering him. That night Majed steals the hard disk that has all the footage on it from Malek why he is sleeping. The episode ends with Malek and Abdullah frantically trying to find the disk while Majed puts in his headphones, packs up his luggage, and walks out the door.

- Episode 13

There is an English-speaking character from Venice who is offering one of the main characters a chance to come visit Venice and jokingly says he will get him a mosque as a gift when he visits. Two characters are dressed up in American clothes and appear to have just bought a Kia with alcohol to celebrate. As they are about to celebrate, men who are higher up in society then harass the young.

- Episode 14

The episode begins with Malek's friend Saeed telling him that the police are going to raid Ahmed's new restaurant because he is dealing alcohol from there. He specifically tells Malek that he and his friends should be far away from there when they do the raid. While this is going on, Ahmed tells Lama that he is going to propose to her tomorrow. Lama was very excited by this because she needs to get away from her abusive father. Ahmed also asks her to come to his new restaurant opening today as it is very important to him. She agrees and brings Bayan with her. Malek begins to race over to the restaurant because Bader and Abdullah work at Ahmed's new restaurant so Malek knew he had to get there and tell them that the police were coming. Malek didn't know that Bayan, Lama, and Majed were going to be there, so he was a little shocked when he saw them as well. Malek ran over to Bayan and told her what was happening, but Majed saw this as them flirting again and came over to confront them once more. Bayan told Majed that nothing has ever happened between her and Malek and Malek respects him very much by sitting far away from her in the movies and by taking different taxis. This catches Majed off guard and you can see that he forgives Malek in his facial expression. Abdullah was in the kitchen cooking when Malek told him that the cops were coming because of alcohol, but he didn't believe Malek until he found a bottle of it. He rushed out of the kitchen to leave with his friends but Ahmed called him up to the stage to give a speech. During his speech, customers found out that the police were coming and everyone started to run out. Abdullah ran back into the kitchen because he forgot his phone, and right before they were about to leave Ahmed showed up and started a fight. He pushed Abdullah down causing him to have a head injury. Ahmed left right before the police came in and arrested Malek and Abdullah. Bader and Majed went to the police station to try to get them out of jail but couldn't unless they brought in Ahmed. They called Lama to see if she could talk to Ahmed and when she called him he told her that he was in the "holiest place in the world." After searching for Ahmed, Bader and Majed remembered that Ahmed loves a certain mosque near his house and they waited outside it until he showed up. When Ahmed saw them he started to run away because he knew that if he went to the police station he was going to jail. They chased him around until they got into a parking garage. Ahmed stole a car and ran over Bader before getting out and attempting to stab Majed with a knife. Right before he was about to succeed, Bader came out of nowhere and successfully subdued Ahmed and brought him to the police station, which released Malek and Abdullah. After they got released, Abdullah went to Majed's house with him, and while Majed was in the shower he found the hard disc that Malek and he were looking for.

== Reception ==
Takki has millions of views on each of its episodes, and is particularly popular with Saudi Arabian youth.

International Business Times wrote a large profile piece about the series. In it, Arie Amaya-Akkermans, a writer on Middle Eastern cinema, is quoted as saying that "The handling of the whole relationship topic is very graceful and that's where I think 'Takki's' success lies. It also has an ambiguously positive portrayal of society, not as in flattering, but as in showing what is usually not shown."

There is also considerable talk about the series providing a momentum for Saudi Arabia's long-dead film industry. The director of photography on Takki, Hashem Ainousa, was interviewed about the prospects of a film industry in Saudi Arabia by the Academy of Art University in San Francisco, the school he attended before receiving a call from Makki to be the cinematographer for this series. They claim that "Ainousa is confident that Saudi Arabia will become open to a film industry, and he plans to be one of the pioneers. He'd like to start a production house that will eventually become a major studio for the production and distribution of feature films and series in Saudi Arabia. He'd also like to establish a filmmaking institute."

== See also ==
- Television in Saudi Arabia
