= MBC Action =

Saudi Arabian television channel launched in 2007

- Type: Satellite television
- Country: Saudi Arabia
- Broadcast area: Middle East and North Africa
- Headquarters: Riyadh, Saudi Arabia

Programming
- Languages: Arabic; English
- Picture format: 1080i (HDTV); 576i (SDTV)

Ownership
- Owner: MBC Group
- Sister channels: Al Arabiya Al Hadath Wanasah MBC 1 MBC 2 MBC 3 MBC 4 MBC Persia MBC Drama MBC Max MBC 5 MBC Bollywood MBC Masr MBC Masr 2 MBC Masr Drama MBC Iraq

History
- Launched: 5 March 2007; 19 years ago

Availability

Streaming media
- MBC Shahid: Watch Online (HD)
- YouTube: Official YouTube channel

MBC Action (Arabic: إم بي سي أكشن; stylized as ^{MBC}ACTION) is a free-to-air Saudi Arabian action-oriented television channel owned by the media conglomerate MBC Group. It targets young male audiences across the Middle East and North Africa and broadcasts Western series, action films, anime, sports programming, and related television content.

== History ==
Subtitled in Arabic language, the channel is a part of the Saudi Arabian media company MBC Group. It is aimed mainly at male audiences, unlike its sister channel MBC 4, which is aimed at female audiences. It delivers Western series, movies, dramas, thrillers, and action reality shows as well as Japanese anime and sports programs. The channel is a weekly "magazine" format show about cars, similar to Top Gear, which also broadcasts the British and American versions of the BBC's Top Gear. It was launched on 5 March 2007 with the pilot episode of the TV series Lost, which, along with Prison Break and The 4400, is one of MBC Action's biggest coups. It also airs new episodes of other shows like 24, Pimp My Ride, The Sparticle Mystery and the Power Rangers. The channel also airs the International Fight League.

MBC Action HD launched on 1 July 2011.

== Sports content ==
=== Football ===
- Bundesliga
- Copa del Rey
- Supercopa de España
- Coppa Italia
- Saudi Women's Premier League
- Saudi Women's Cup
- Saudi Women's Super Cup

== See also ==
- Cinema of Saudi Arabia
- Television in Saudi Arabia
