= MBC Masr 2 =

Saudi Arabian television channel launched in 2014

- Type: Satellite television
- Country: Saudi Arabia
- Broadcast area: Middle East and North Africa (main audience free-to-air); Horn of Africa (peripheral free-to-air via satellite)
- Headquarters: Cairo, Egypt

Programming
- Languages: English; Arabic
- Picture format: 1080i (HDTV); 576i (SDTV)

Ownership
- Owner: MBC Group
- Sister channels: Al Hadath; Al Arabiya; MBC 1; MBC 2; MBC 3; MBC 4; MBC 5; MBC Persia; MBC Drama; MBC Action; MBC Max; MBC Bollywood; MBC Masr; MBC Masr Drama; MBC Iraq

History
- Launched: 25 October 2014; 11 years ago

Availability

Streaming media
- MBC Shahid: Watch Online (HD)
- YouTube: Official YouTube channel

MBC Masr 2 is a Saudi Arabian free-to-air television channel based in Egypt and owned by the MBC Group. It is the group’s second Egyptian-focused channel, after MBC Masr.

== History ==
An official ceremony was held in Cairo on 25 October 2014 to mark the launch of the channel. MBC Masr 2 was launched as the second Egyptian television channel by the MBC Group, following MBC Masr. The channel serves Egyptian audiences, and was later joined by the sister channel MBC Masr Drama.

== Programming ==
=== Shows ===
- Atlantis
- Al Anisa Farah
- Blue Bloods
- Back To The Island
- En tierras salvajes
- Desperate Housewives (TR)
- Friends
- Jane the Virgin (AR)
- La reina soy yo
- La bella y las bestias
- La Piloto
- NCIS
- NCIS
- NCIS: Los Angeles
- Paixão
- Rainha das Flores
- Terra Brava
- Kuzey Güney
- Muhtesem Yuzyil
- Sefirin Kızı
- Umutsuz Ev Kadınları
- Além do Tempo
- Deus Salve o Rei
- Justiça
- Rock Story
- Sol Nascente
- Totalmente Demais
- Verdades Secretas
- Ek Hasina Thi
- Saraswatichandra
- Ishq Mein Marjawan 2
- Mahi Way
- Rishta.com
- Udaariyaan
- Velvet
- To Tatouaz
- WWE
- WWE Crown Jewel
- WWE RAW
- WWE Main Event
- Scoop
- Scoop with Raya
- Scoop with Raya
- Nazaré
- Aile
- The Sopranos (TR)
- Ya Çok Seversen
- Groove High
- Yabani

=== North American series ===
- Al Anisa Farah
- Blue Bloods
- Friends
- Jane the Virgin (AR)
- NCIS
- NCIS
- NCIS: Los Angeles

=== British series ===
- Atlantis
- Groove High

=== Mexican drama ===
- En tierras salvajes
- La reina soy yo

=== Spanish drama ===
- La bella y las bestias
- La Piloto
- Velvet

=== Spanish-language series ===
- La bella y las bestias
- La Piloto

=== Italian series ===
- Back To The Island

=== Portuguese drama ===
- Nazaré
- Paixão
- Rainha das Flores
- Terra Brava

=== Turkish drama ===
- Desperate Housewives (TR)
- Kuzey Güney
- Muhtesem Yuzyil
- Sefirin Kızı
- Umutsuz Ev Kadınları
- Aile
- The Sopranos (TR)
- Ya Çok Seversen
- Yabani

=== Brazilian drama ===
- Além do Tempo
- Deus Salve o Rei
- Justiça
- Rock Story
- Sol Nascente
- Totalmente Demais
- Verdades Secretas

=== Greek drama ===
- To Tatouaz

=== Indian series ===
- Ek Hasina Thi
- Saraswatichandra
- Ishq Mein Marjawan 2
- Mahi Way
- Rishta.com
- Udaariyaan

=== Wrestling ===
- WWE
- WWE Crown Jewel
- WWE RAW
- WWE Main Event

== Movies ==
=== North American movies ===
- 2 Fast 2 Furious
- 211
- Allied
- Baywatch
- Beauty and the Beast
- Bedtime Stories
- Bumblebee
- Beautiful Creatures
- Captain Phillips
- Collateral Beauty
- Contagion
- Dora and the Lost City of Gold
- Fast & Furious 4
- Fast & Furious 6
- Fast Five
- Fast & Furious Presents: Hobbs & Shaw
- Fast & Furious 9: The Fast Saga
- The Fast and the Furious
- The Fast and the Furious: Tokyo Drift
- The Fate of the Furious
- Fast X
- First Blood
- Furious 7
- Five Minarets in New York
- Five Feet Apart
- Kites: The Remix
- Kites
- New York
- The Mummy
- The Mummy Returns
- The Mummy: Tomb of the Dragon Emperor
- The Mummy
- My Name Is Khan
- Mad Max: Fury Road
- The Rock
- Hercules
- Home
- Jack Reacher
- Jack Reacher: Never Go Back
- Jackie
- Paul
- Rambo
- Rambo: First Blood Part II
- Rambo III
- Rambo: Last Blood
- Shall We Dance?
- Spinning Man
- The Secret Life of Pets
- Suicide Squad
- Teenage Mutant Ninja Turtles
- Power Rangers
- Pokémon: Detective Pikachu
- The Sum of All Fears
- Sonic the Hedgehog
- Transformers
- Transformers: Age of Extinction
- Transformers: Dark of the Moon
- Transformers: The Last Knight
- Transformers: Revenge of the Fallen
- Transformers: Rise of the Beasts
- X2
- Zero Dark Thirty

=== Australian movies ===
- Mad Max: Fury Road

=== Hindi-language movies ===
- Bang Bang!
- Badrinath Ki Dulhania
- Befikre
- Dishoom
- Fan
- Humpty Sharma Ki Dulhania
- Laila Majnu
- Luka Chuppi
- Pink
- Shaandaar

=== Urdu-language movies ===
- Baaji

== Channel Frequency ==
- Eutelsat 7 West A 11219 H 27500 3/4 HD & SD (MENA Only)
- Eutelsat 7 West A 12467 H 30000 2/3 HD & SD (MENA Only) From February 26 - End of Eid Al Fitr
- Eutelsat 7 West A 12467 H 27500 3/4 HD & SD (MENA Only) From February 20 - 25
- Nilesat 201 11823 V 27500 5/6 SD (MENA Only)
- Eutelsat 7 West A 12322 V 30000 3/4 HD (MENA Only) From 2024 - 2025
