= MBC Persia =

Saudi Arabian television channel launched in 2008

- Type: Satellite television
- Country: Saudi Arabia
- Broadcast area: Middle East and North Africa
- Headquarters: Riyadh, Saudi Arabia

Programming
- Languages: Persian – subtitles and dubbing
- Picture format: 1080p (HDTV); 576i (SDTV)

Ownership
- Owner: MBC Group
- Sister channels: Al Arabiya; Al Hadath; Wanasah; MBC 1; MBC 2; MBC 3; MBC 4; MBC 5; MBC Action; MBC Drama; MBC Max; MBC Bollywood; MBC Masr; MBC Masr 2; MBC Masr Drama; MBC Iraq

History
- Launched: 9 July 2008; 18 years ago

Availability

Streaming media
- MBC Shahid: Watch Online (HD)
- YouTube: Official YouTube channel

MBC Persia (Persian: ام‌بی‌سی پرشیا) is a free-to-air Saudi Arabian television channel owned by the media conglomerate MBC Group. The channel primarily broadcasts movies and television series for Iranian audiences, with all programmes subtitled or dubbed in Persian.

== History ==
=== Initial launch and closure (2008–2013) ===
MBC Persia was first launched on 9 July 2008 by the MBC Group as a 24-hour free-to-air satellite channel. The station was established to provide Western entertainment to Persian-speaking audiences in Iran and the wider region. During this first phase, the channel’s programming consisted primarily of Hollywood films and American television series broadcast with Persian subtitles. Despite achieving significant viewership, the channel was "shelved" in 2013 as part of a strategic shift within the MBC Group.

=== Relaunch and strategic shift (2018–present) ===
On 6 October 2018, MBC Group officially relaunched MBC Persia with a focus on a "family entertainment" model to compete with other major Persian-language broadcasters. The relaunch marked a move away from subtitled-only content toward a more diverse programming slate, including dubbed international dramas and original Persian-language programming such as Persia's Got Talent. During this period, the channel was broadcast on the Al-Yah satellite, which is now defunct.

=== Corporate status and 2026 operations ===
The channel is currently operated as part of the MBC Group's central headquarters in Riyadh, Saudi Arabia. As of 2026, MBC Persia continues to expand its localized content, featuring in the group’s coordinated programming launches alongside the MBC Shahid digital platform.

== See also ==
- Cinema of Saudi Arabia
- Television in Saudi Arabia
