= MBC 4 =

Saudi Arabian television channel launched in 2005

- Type: Satellite television
- Country: Saudi Arabia
- Broadcast area: Middle East and North Africa (main audience free-to-air); Horn of Africa (peripheral free-to-air via satellite); United States and Europe (pay-TV)
- Headquarters: Riyadh, Saudi Arabia

Programming
- Language: Arabic
- Picture format: 1080i HDTV (downscaled to 16:9 576i for the SDTV feed)

Ownership
- Owner: MBC Group
- Sister channels: Al Arabiya; Al Hadath; Wanasah; MBC 1; MBC 2; MBC 3; MBC 5; MBC Persia; MBC Action; MBC Drama; MBC Max; MBC Bollywood; MBC Masr; MBC Masr 2; MBC Masr Drama; MBC Iraq

History
- Launched: 1 February 2005; 21 years ago

Availability

Streaming media
- MBC Shahid: Watch Online (HD)
- YouTube: Official YouTube channel

MBC 4 (Arabic: إم بي سي 4) is a free-to-air Saudi Arabian entertainment television channel owned by the MBC Group. It primarily targets female audiences. The channel broadcasts international programming with Arabic subtitles and is particularly known for airing dubbed Turkish drama series, alongside lifestyle and reality programming.

== History ==
MBC 4 was a spin-off of MBC 2 that began airing on 1 February 2005. Originally intended to provide Western news and entertainment to liberal adults, MBC 4 later transitioned to concentrate on women viewers. Programming on MBC 4 is supported by advertising. Its tagline is "So You can Watch What They Watch".

== Programming ==
MBC 4 airs series and talk shows from the United States, Turkey, United Kingdom, and Australia, subtitled in Arabic. Kissing or intimate scenes are typically edited out of programs from other countries.

Some programmes that have aired on MBC4 include 3rd Rock from the Sun, Seinfeld, The Early Show, Jeopardy!, Days of Our Lives, Two and a Half Men, America's Got Talent, American Idol, Oprah, Friends, So You Think You Can Dance, Late Show with David Letterman, The Talk, The Dr. Oz Show, The Vampire Diaries, Ringer, and Desperate Housewives.

It broadcast the Turkish soap operas Kiraz Mevsimi and Nour, but airing of Turkish programmes was suspended in 2018 due to political tensions between Saudi Arabia and Turkey. Turkish series later returned to the channel, with a temporary removal in 2023 due to political issues, before broadcasts resumed as relations improved.

MBC 4 also airs original Arabic programmes. As of 2022, the reality TV show Stars of Science has aired on MBC 4 for 14 seasons. MBC 4 aired a version of The X Factor for the Arab world. In 2022, MBC 4 aired the original series Stiletto.

== See also ==
- Cinema of Saudi Arabia
- Television in Saudi Arabia
