= Al Arabiya =

Saudi Arabian television news channel launched in 2003

Al Arabiya العربية
- Logo used since 2020
- Country: Saudi Arabia
- Broadcast area: Worldwide
- Headquarters: Riyadh, Saudi Arabia

Programming
- Language: Arabic
- Picture format: 1080i (HDTV); 576i (SDTV)

Ownership
- Parent: MBC Group
- Sister channels: Al Hadath; Wanasah; MBC 1; MBC 2; MBC 3; MBC 4; MBC 5; MBC Action; MBC Drama; MBC Max; MBC Persia; MBC Bollywood; MBC Masr; MBC Masr 2; MBC Masr Drama; MBC Iraq

History
- Launched: 3 March 2003; 23 years ago

Links
- Website: alarabiya.net (Arabic) english.alarabiya.net (English) farsi.alarabiya.net (Persian) urdu.alarabiya.net (Urdu)

Availability

Streaming media
- MBC Shahid: Watch online (HD)
- YouTube: Official YouTube channel

Al Arabiya (Arabic: العربية, romanized: al-ʿArabiyyah; stylized as al arabiya العربية) is a Saudi Arabian state-owned international Arabic-language television news channel. It is based in Riyadh and operates as a subsidiary of the MBC Group, a major media conglomerate in the Middle East and North Africa.

== History ==
Al Arabiya was originally launched in Dubai Media City, United Arab Emirates, on 3 March 2003. An early funder, the production company Middle East News (then headed by Ali al-Hedeithy), said the goal was to provide "a balanced and less provocative" alternative to Al Jazeera.

A free-to-air channel, Al Arabiya broadcasts standard newscasts every hour, as well as talk shows and documentaries. It has been rated among the top pan-Arab stations by Middle East audiences. The news organization's website is accessible in Arabic, English, Urdu, and Persian.

On 26 January 2009, U.S. President Barack Obama gave his first formal interview as president to Al Arabiya, delivering the message to the Islamic world that "Americans are not your enemy," while also reiterating that "Israel is a strong ally of the United States" and that they "will not stop being a strong ally of the United States".

In March 2012, the channel launched a new channel, Al Hadath, which focused on political news.

Mamdouh al-Muhaini became general manager of the Al Arabiya Network in October 2019, succeeding former manager Nabil al-Khatib.

On 24 April 2020, Al Arabiya introduced a new graphics and audio package, new studios, and a new modified logo in the network's first major rebrand since its launch in 2003. The following year, the network moved operations from Dubai to Riyadh, with the stated goal being to "produce 12 hours of news programming from the Saudi capital by early January". The move came amid orders by the Saudi government to multinational companies to move their regional hubs to the kingdom by 2024. The relocation to Riyadh officially completed in July 2025.

== Divisions ==
Al Arabiya operates several specialized digital platforms that target different linguistic and regional audiences.

Al Arabiya Divisions
Division	Language	Description	Online Presence
Al Arabiya English	English	Provides international news, analysis, and features for English-speaking audiences, with a focus on Middle East affairs.	Website / YouTube
Al Arabiya Business	Arabic	Business and financial news service, focusing on regional and global markets.	YouTube
Al Arabiya Urdu	Urdu	Delivers news and current affairs in Urdu, catering to South Asian audiences, particularly in Pakistan and India.	Website
Al Arabiya Persian	Persian	Offers news and analysis in Persian, aimed at Iranian and Persian-speaking viewers worldwide.	Website

== Content and competition ==
As a response to Al Jazeera's critical coverage of the Saudi royal family throughout the 1990s, relatives of the Saudi royal family established Al Arabiya in Dubai in 2002. Al Arabiya was said to be the second most frequently watched channel after Al Jazeera in Saudi Arabia. In 2008, The New York Times described the channel as working "to cure Arab television of its penchant for radical politics and violence".

In 2012, Al Arabiya broadcast the email messages of Syrian president Bashar al-Assad that were leaked by opposition hackers.

== Programming ==
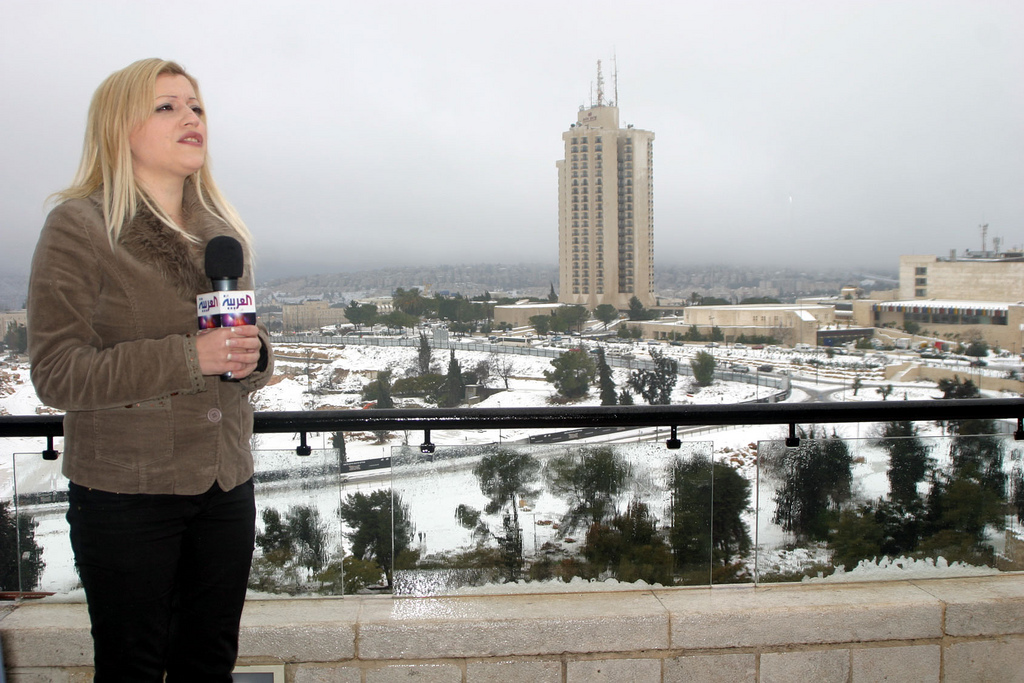
Al Arabiya reporter in Jerusalem, Israel/Palestine

- Special Mission is Al Arabiya's longest-running investigative journalism/current affairs television program. It broadcasts on the Al Arabiya Pan Arab Channel based in Dubai. Premiering on 19 October 2003, it is still running. The program is based on the investigative Panorama concept, addressing an issue each week, by showing a locally produced program or a relevant documentary. The program is centered around topics like politics, economy, or religion. In 2023, the Special Mission received a gold Telly award at the 44th Annual Telly Awards.
- Eda'at (Arabic: إضاءات, meaning "Spotlights"), hosted by Turki al-Dakhil, aired every Thursday at 2:00 PM (Saudi Arabia time) and lasts one hour. The show consists of one-on-one interviews with influential regional figures, such as journalists, writers, activists, politicians, etc.
- Rawafed (Arabic: روافد, meaning "Affluents") is directed and hosted by Ahmad Ali El Zein, and broadcast once a week (Wednesday at 5:30 PM). Rawafed is a series of documentaries/interviews about arts and culture. Guests have included writers Tahar Ben Jelloun, Gamal El-Ghitani, poets Adunis, Ahmed Fouad Negm, Joumana Haddad, musicians, Marcel Khalifa, Naseer Shamma. Many key principle artists, writers and politicians in the Arab world have also appeared on the show.
- From Iraq is a socio-political, humanitarian program which strives to uncover the realities inside of Iraq. The program is broadcast Sundays and presented by Mayssoun Noueihed.
- Inside Iran is a series which focuses on investigative reporting, primarily on political, social, and economic issues inside Iran.
- Death Making is a weekly broadcast which airs Fridays, focusing on global terror. The show provides analysis on global terror attacks around the globe, and discusses religious, social, economic, and political factors. It also provides interviews with well-known figures. It is hosted by Mohammed Altoumaihi.
- Business Profiles is a monthly program which provides an in-depth portrait of regional business leaders. The program typically follows an influential business person, including outside of their office, in order to better understand their ways of thinking. It is presented by Fatima Zahra Daoui, and has been on air since June 2013.
- Point of Order is a weekly program, broadcast on Fridays, which conducts live interviews focusing on socio-political topics. It features controversial figures, such as Syrian President Bashar al-Assad, French philosopher Bernard-Henri Lévy, and others. It is hosted by Hasan Muawad.
- Political Memoirs is a weekly program that discusses historical events from various points of view. It is presented by Taher Barake, and is broadcast on Fridays.
- Diplomatic Avenues is a monthly program focusing on the United Nations. It is broadcast live from Al Arabiya's studios in the Headquarters of the United Nations, and features interviews with high-level UN officials and diplomats. The program focuses on political, social, scientific, and humanitarian issues before the UN, with an emphasis on the Arab and Islamic worlds. It is hosted by Talal al-Haj, and broadcasts on the last Friday of each month.
- Studio Beirut is a weekly discussion program, broadcast on Sundays, which features prominent guests from the Arab world. It is hosted by Giselle Khoury.
- The Big Screen is a weekly program which focuses on the film industry, and serves as an entertainment show, discussing celebrities and film. It provides coverage on industry news, upcoming films, film festivals, and interviews with industry leaders, as well as celebrities. It is hosted by Nadine Kirresh.

== Investment and ownership ==
Al Arabiya was initially founded through investment by the Middle East Broadcasting Center (later rebranded as MBC Group), as well as other investors from Saudi Arabia, Kuwait, and the Gulf states. Through MBC, Saudi Prince Abdulaziz bin Fahd and his maternal uncle Waleed bin Ibrahim al Ibrahim were reported to have partial ownership of Al Arabiya.

In 2025, the Public Investment Fund (PIF) of Saudi Arabia acquired a 54% stake in MBC Group, the parent company of Al Arabiya, following the completion of a majority acquisition. Waleed bin Ibrahim al Ibrahim retains a 36% stake in the company.

== Controversies and criticism ==
Al Arabiya has been the topic of controversy. It has been criticized as an arm of Saudi foreign policy.

On 14 February 2005, Al Arabiya was the first news satellite channel to air news of the assassination of Rafik Hariri. In September 2008, Iran expelled Al Arabiya's Tehran bureau chief Hassan Fahs, the third Al Arabiya correspondent expelled from Iran since the network opened an Iran office. In October of the same year, the Al Arabiya website was hacked by attackers who claimed to be Shi'ites.

In 2009, Courtney C. Radsch lost her job the day after publishing an article about safety problems on the airline Emirates, a move Al Arabiya described as restructuring in the English department. In June 2009, the Iranian government ordered the Al Arabiya office in Tehran to be closed for a week for "unfair reporting" of the that year's Iranian presidential election. Seven days later, amid the election, the network's office was "closed indefinitely" by the government.

In 2016, Al Arabiya dismissed 50 staff members, including journalists. Citing financial problems stemming from low oil prices, the dismissed individuals were offered salaries and benefits for six months as a severance package.

In April 2017, Al Arabiya was found in breach of UK broadcasting law by the UK media regulator, Ofcom, for broadcasting an interview with an imprisoned Bahraini torture survivor. Ofcom concluded that it infringed on the privacy of imprisoned Bahraini opposition leader and torture survivor Hassan Mushaima, when it broadcast footage of him obtained during his arbitrary detention in Bahrain. Ofcom sanctioned the licence holder Al Arabiya News Channel FZ-LLC by fining them £120,000 and directing them to broadcast an on-air apology. The channel then surrendered its license to broadcast in the following month after an additional complaint was filed by Qatar News Agency.

=== Arab criticism ===
In November 2004, the interim Iraqi government banned Al Arabiya from reporting from the country after it broadcast an audio tape reportedly made by the deposed Iraqi President Saddam Hussein. Two years later, the Iraqi government also banned the channel for one month for "imprecise coverage". According to the station itself, Al Arabiya journalists and staff have come under constant pressure from Iraqi officials to allegedly "report stories as dictated to" and in 2014, Iraqi PM Nouri Maliki threatened again to ban Al Arabiya in Iraq, shut down its offices and websites. For his part, Al Arabiya's General Manager at the time, Abdulrahman al-Rashed, vowed in a statement that the news channel and its sister channel al-Hadath will continue reporting the story in Iraq despite "Maliki's threats" as well as other threats from the likes of ISIS.

Due to post-coverage of assassination of Rafic Hariri, as of 2007, Syrian politicians have criticized Al Arabiya for anti-government and perceived pro-US and pro-Israeli bias.

In 2013, Saudi Islamic scholar Abdulaziz al-Tarefe criticized the channel in a viral tweet.

The Algerian Ministry of Communication released a statement on 31 July 2021 saying that it withdrew Al Arabiya's operating accreditation in Algeria, due to what it termed "the non-respect by this channel of the rules of deontology and its recourse to disinformation and manipulation".

The Boycott, Divestment and Sanction (BDS) movement's Arabic-language account published a call to boycott Al Arabiya and some other Arabic language channels what they called "the mouthpieces of the Israeli enemy that speak Arabic"

=== Killed and abducted reporters ===
In September 2003, Al Arabiya reporter Mazen al-Tumeizi was killed on camera in Iraq when a U.S. helicopter fired on a crowd in Haifa Street in Baghdad.

In February 2006, three Al Arabiya reporters were abducted and murdered while covering the aftermath of the bombing of a mosque in Samarra, Iraq. Among them was correspondent Atwar Bahjat, an Iraqi national.

In 2012, Al Arabiya's Asia correspondent Baker Atyani was abducted in the Philippines by an armed militia. He was released after 18 months.

=== Plagiarism ===
In August 2015, the Egyptian Streets news website said Al Arabiya had copied "word-for-word" from two of its articles. Al Arabiya later updated one of the articles and added a note citing the error.

=== Fake reporters ===
In 2020, The Daily Beast identified a network of false personas used to insert opinion pieces aligned with UAE government policy to media outlets including Al Arabiya. The pieces were critical about Turkey's role in the Middle East, as well as Qatar and particularly its state media Al Jazeera. Twitter suspended some of the fake columnists' accounts in early July 2020.

=== Notable interviews ===
In 2009, Al Arabiya aired an interview between journalist Hisham Melhem and then newly elected president of the United States, Barack Obama. The broadcast was the first-ever formal interview with Obama during his first administration.

During the 2020 Nagorno-Karabakh conflict, the channel interviewed Armenian President Armen Sarkissian about the ongoing war happening between Armenia and Azerbaijan, during which President Sarkissian blasted Turkey and Azerbaijan for inflaming the conflict. In response, Turkish President Recep Tayyip Erdoğan accused Saudi Arabia and the United Arab Emirates of destabilization in the Caucasus and Middle East, resulting in Saudi Arabian Commercial Chamber's Head Ajlan al-Ajlan to call for boycott against Turkish goods.

== Distribution ==
In March 2022, Al Arabiya acquired its own Freeview channel in the United Kingdom, after being available on Freeview via the Vision TV streaming service, with both channels being available on Freeview channel 273. The channel also operates a business website that covers financial news and market data from the Middle East in Arabic. Al Arabiya streams online on JumpTV and Livestation. The English website of Al Arabiya was relaunched in 2013 and now features automated subtitles of the news and programs that appear on the channel.

The Al Arabiya website experienced technical difficulties during the Egyptian protests at the end of January 2011. The site went offline with error messages as such as the following: "The website is down due to the heavy traffic to follow up with the Egyptian crisis and it will be back within three hours (Time of message: 11 GMT)".

== Channel frequency ==
- Nilesat 11559 V 27500 5/6 HD (North Africa Only)
- Nilesat 11470 V 27500 5/6 HD (Middle East Only)
- Hotbird 13G 11747 H 27500 3/4 HD
- Badr 8 12399 V 27500 3/4 HD (Gobx Only)
- Asiasat 5 4080 H 30000 5/6 HD (Asia-Pacific)
- Badr 8 12284 V 27500 5/6 HD (North Africa Only)
- Badr 8 11938 V 27500 Auto,3/4 or 5/6 HD & SD
- Nilesat 11747 V 27500 5/6 SD
- Intelsat 19 12606 H 30000 5/6 SD ( Only Australia & New Zealand)
- Al Yah 1 11938 H 27500 HD (Central Asia, Middle East)
- Eutelsat 172B 12611 H 30000 3/4 SD (Only South Pacific) (LEFT THE FREQUENCY)
- NigComSat 1R 12589 H 26250 3/4 HD (Ecowas 2)
- Anik F3 12094 L 20000 3/4 SD (North America Only)
- Anik F3 12185 L 20000 3/4 HD (North America Only)
- Eutelsat 7 West A 12169 V 27500 3/4 SD (LEFT THE FREQUENCY IN 2021)

== See also ==
- Cinema of Saudi Arabia
- Television in Saudi Arabia
