= The Great Indian Global Kitchen =

The Great Indian Global Kitchen is an Indian television show, first shown in 2018, which features Indian dishes with a global twist and is hosted by celebrity chefs.

It is filmed in Mumbai, India, and produced by One Take Media Productions.

== Chefs ==
Celebrity Chefs part of The Great Indian Global Kitchen:

1. Chef Harpal Singh Sokhi
2. Chef Vicky Ratnani
3. Chef Ajay Chopra
4. Chef Aditya Bal
5. Chef Nilesh Limaye
6. Chef Bhairav Singh

Presenters:

1. Host Shamoly Khera
2. Host Reshmi Ghosh
3. Host Gauri Jan Irani
4. Host Sudeepta
5. Host Snehal Rai
