= MBC Max =

Saudi Arabian television channel launched in 2008

- Type: Satellite television
- Country: Saudi Arabia
- Broadcast area: Middle East and North Africa
- Headquarters: Riyadh, Saudi Arabia

Programming
- Languages: English (audio); Arabic (subtitles)
- Picture format: 1080i (HDTV) (downscaled to 16:9 576i for the SDTV feed)

Ownership
- Owner: MBC Group
- Sister channels: Al Arabiya; Al Hadath; Wanasah; MBC 1; MBC 2; MBC 3; MBC 4; MBC 5; MBC Persia; MBC Action; MBC Drama; MBC Bollywood; MBC Masr; MBC Masr 2; MBC Masr Drama; MBC Iraq

History
- Launched: 26 October 2008; 17 years ago

Availability

Streaming media
- MBC Shahid: Watch online (HD)
- YouTube: Official YouTube channel

MBC Max (stylized as MBC MAX) is a Saudi Arabian free-to-air television channel that broadcasts English-language films 24/7, serving as an alternative to its sister channel, MBC 2.

== History ==
The channel was launched as a test broadcast on 22 October 2008. During that time, it would continuously show its own promotional TV ad on loop. The channel's official launch date was the 26 October at 6:00 pm KSA time. Its first aired film was Spider-Man.

== Content ==
MBC Max shows films with milder, more family-friendly content compared to MBC 2. MBC Max may not show horror films and other related genres. Furthermore, the channel does not show any film that contains extreme forms of violence. MBC Max has slightly more censorship than MBC 2, mostly with the audio, simply removing the majority of a film's bad language, as well as bigger cuts of other censored and sexual scenes.

MBC Max also features MBC 4 and MBC Action prints of animated and family films, always broadcasting in the middle of the afternoon U.A.E. time, as these films feature the same MBC 4-based and MBC Action-based, higher-level censorship. This only applies to films that were originally on MBC 4 and MBC Action, as the animated and family films that premiered on MBC Max did not feature such censorship; many of those films later appeared on MBC 4 and MBC Action, censored.

In addition to broadcasting mild films, it broadcasts certain R-rated films, such as dramas and comedies, including Spider-Man, Spider-Man 2, Cheaper by the Dozen, Cheaper by the Dozen 2, Pirates of the Caribbean: The Curse of the Black Pearl, Around the World in 80 Days, Robots, Camp Rock, Nim's Island, Bridge to Terabithia and Me, Myself & Irene, with the audio heavily edited since the film contained cursing. It is only important to the channel that films do not feature extreme visual violence and/or sexual themes.

Additionally, MBC Max broadcasts classical films more often than MBC 2, since the majority of Hollywood films from the 1960s and earlier are considered mild by later standards.

== See also ==
- Television in Saudi Arabia
