= MBC Drama (Saudi TV channel) =

Saudi Arabian television channel launched in 2010

- Type: Satellite television
- Country: Saudi Arabia
- Broadcast area: Middle East and North Africa (main audience free-to-air); Horn of Africa (peripheral free-to-air via satellite); United States and Europe (pay-TV)
- Headquarters: Riyadh, Saudi Arabia

Programming
- Language: Arabic
- Picture format: 1080i (HDTV); 576i (SDTV)

Ownership
- Owner: MBC Group
- Sister channels: Al Arabiya Al Hadath Wanasah MBC 1 MBC 2 MBC 3 MBC 4 MBC 5 MBC Persia MBC Action MBC Max MBC Bollywood MBC Masr MBC Masr 2 MBC Masr Drama MBC Iraq

History
- Launched: 27 November 2010; 15 years ago

Availability

Streaming media
- MBC Shahid: Watch Online (HD)
- YouTube: Official YouTube channel

MBC Drama (Arabic: إم بي سي دراما) is a Saudi Arabian free-to-air television channel owned by MBC Group. It broadcasts drama series, with a particular focus on Arabic drama.

== Programming and presentation ==
MBC Drama broadcasts a wide range of drama series, with a particular focus on Arabic productions. Its programming includes Egyptian, Iraqi, Lebanese, Levantine, Syrian, Bedouin, and Gulf dramas, many of which air as first-run or exclusive broadcasts. The channel is also distinguished by scheduling additional repeat airings throughout the day.

MBC Drama also produces and airs original Arabic programming. As of 2022, the channel broadcast original series such as Stiletto and Heera.

The channel’s on-air presentation includes high-definition idents filmed using high-speed cameras operating at 1000–1500 frames per second, creating a smooth slow-motion effect. An HD simulcast, MBC Drama HD, was launched on 1 July 2011.

In addition to Arabic content, MBC Drama has aired dubbed international films as part of the MBC Group’s programming strategy. Following the success of the Indian film Jodhaa Akbar, MBC Group secured a deal to broadcast 32 Indian films. These films were later aired on MBC Drama and MBC 1 as part of a dubbed films package aimed at Arab audiences.

== See also ==
- Cinema of Saudi Arabia
- Television in Saudi Arabia
