= Al Hadath =

Saudi Arabian television channel launched in 2012

Al Hadath الحدث
- Logo used since 2023
- Type: Satellite television
- Country: Saudi Arabia
- Broadcast area: Middle East and North Africa
- Headquarters: Riyadh, Saudi Arabia

Programming
- Language: Arabic
- Picture format: 1080i (HDTV); 576i (SDTV)

Ownership
- Parent: MBC Group
- Sister channels: Al Arabiya; Wanasah; MBC 1; MBC 2; MBC 3; MBC 4; MBC 5; MBC Action; MBC Drama; MBC Max; MBC Persia; MBC Bollywood; MBC Masr; MBC Masr 2; MBC Masr Drama; MBC Iraq

History
- Launched: 12 January 2012; 14 years ago

Links
- Website: alhadath.net (Arabic)

Availability

Streaming media
- MBC Shahid: Watch online (HD)
- YouTube: Official YouTube channel

Al Hadath (Arabic: الحدث, lit. 'The Event') is a Saudi Arabian state-owned Arabic-language interactive television news channel that focuses primarily on political developments in the Arab world. It operates as a sister channel to Al Arabiya and serves as an extension of its coverage, offering in-depth reports and live updates on breaking news events.

== Overview ==
The channel is accessible internationally and is available in the United Kingdom via the Vision TV streaming platform on the British Freeview service. From 28 March 2022, it became available alongside Al Arabiya on Freeview channel 273. Al Hadath also operates country-specific social media pages such as Al Hadath Yemen and Al Hadath Egypt on platforms including X (formerly Twitter) and Facebook, offering localized news and updates.

The Boycott, Divestment and Sanctions (BDS) movement's Arabic-language account published a call to boycott al-Hadath along with its sister channel Al Arabiya for being what they called "the mouthpieces of the Israeli enemy that speak Arabic".

== Programmes ==
- Egyptian street
- Face2face
- Al Hadath all eye
- Points-of-views

== Channel Frequency ==
- Eutelsat 8 West B 11470 V 27500 5/6 SD ( Only Middle East)
- Eutelsat 7 West A 11559 V 27500 5/6 SD ( Only North Africa)
- Nilesat 201 11747 V 27500 5/6 SD (MENA Only)
- Badr 8 12092 V 27500 5/6 SD ( Only Europe Middle East North Africa)
- Badr 8 12284 V 27500 5/6 SD ( Only North Africa)
- Eutelsat 7 West A 12322 V 30000 3/4 HD ( MENA Only)
- Hotbird 13G 11747 H 27500 3/4 HD
- Eutelsat 7 West A 11373 H 27500 5/6 (MENA Only) From 2021 - 2023
- Eutelsat 7 West A 12169 V 27500 3/4 SD (LEFT THE FREQUENCY IN 2021)
