= Al-Majd TV Network =

Television channel of Saudi Arabia

Al-Majd Network
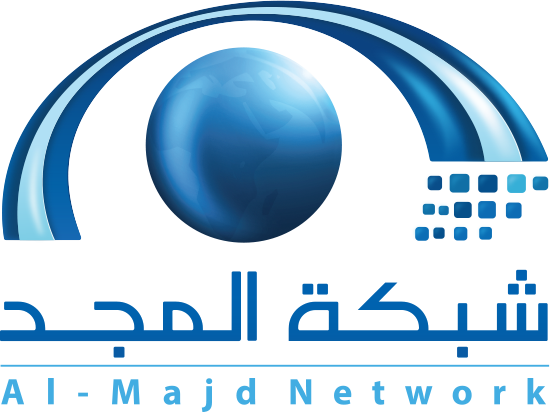
- Al-Majd Network
- Country: Saudi Arabia
- Broadcast area: Middle East and North Africa
- Headquarters: Riyadh, Saudi Arabia

Programming
- Language: Arabic

History
- Launched: November 2002

Links
- Website: almajdtv.com (in Arabic)

Al-Majd Network (شبكة المجد) is a group of general and specialized satellite television channels which includes five free-to-air channels and eight encrypted channels. The group has a strong Salafi Islamic orientation and is owned by Saudi businessman Fahad Abdulrahman Alshimeimri, with other partners.

== History ==
Al-Majd Satellite Network was founded in November 2002.

As of 2022, Broadcasting and production is done in Riyadh and Cairo. There were additional production and broadcasting offices in Dubai, Amman, Rabat, Baghdad, Damascus and Beirut, in addition to tens of productive companies.

Until 2016, there was live SMS messaging for some channels, including Al-Majd Kids.

Starting 2022 and ending the same year, there used to be a channel called Al-Majd Zaman; which used to be another variety & entertainment channel from Al-Majd Network airing some of the network’s archives.

== Free-to-air channels ==
- Al-Majd Satellite Channel: Al-Majd Network’s main channel.
- Al-Majd Quran Channel: The first 24-hour Qur’an television channel in the world.
- Al-Majd Hadeeth Channel: The first TV channel in the world that focuses on the quotes of Muhammad, as well as Hadith-related content.
- Al-Ilmiya (Al-Majd Religious Sciences): One of the first educational TV channels in the Middle East, focusing on Religious Sciences.
- Radio Dal for Children: Considered by the network as the first children’s radio in the world. Radio Dal hasn’t been available as an FM radio station as of yet.

== Encrypted channels ==
- Al-Majd News Service (formerly known as “Al-Alam Al-Yaum”): The only world news service in Al-Majd Network as of now.
- Al-Majd Documentary Channel: The first documentary channel in the Arab World.
- Al-Majd Nature Channel: The first nature channel in the Arab World.
- Al-Majd Kids Channel (also known as “Majd”): Al-Majd Network’s main kids channel, which features mostly live-action children’s content.
- Basma Channel: A 24/7 cartoon channel, and one of Al-Majd Network’s kids channels.
- Rawdah: The first channel in the Middle East that produces and airs educational content for children aged 2-5.
- Taghareed: A channel that specializes in children’s nasheeds.
- Masah: Al-Majd Network’s main variety & entertainment channel, with content that includes drama series.
- Al-Ajaweed: A channel airing the most watched program; Al-Ajaweed, Which used to be a normal series airing on the free-to-air channel being Al-Majd Satellite Channel every afternoon, the series gained a Giant viewer-base, leading to the start of this channel.

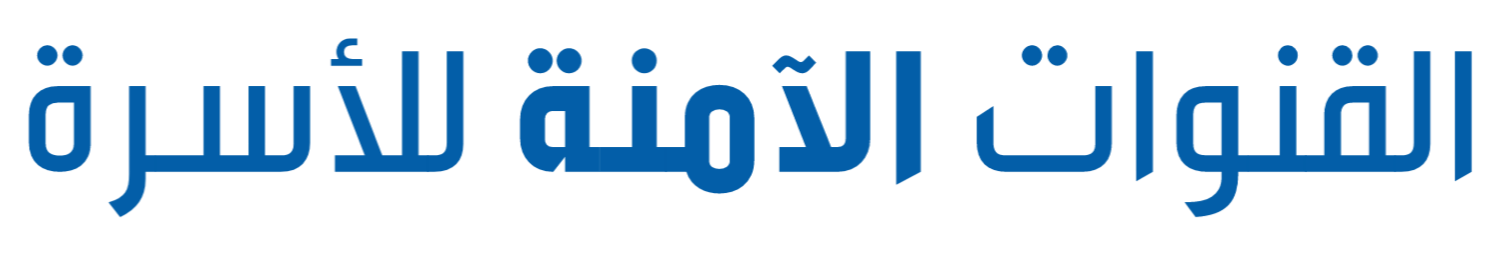
Almajd Network's Slogan translated into English "Safe channels for your family."
