= Panorama FM =

Programming
- Format: Radio format

Ownership
- Owner: radio station

Panorama FM is a radio station affiliated with the MBC Group, launched in 2005, targeting young people across the Arab world. The station broadcasts talk shows as well as the latest Arabic songs. In a short time, the station has managed to gain a large following.

== Programs ==
- My Story, Your Story (Presented by Wissam Bredy.)
- Born Again (Presented by Ali Taleb Al-Marani.)

== See also ==
- MBC Group
