= MBC 2 (Saudi TV channel) =

Saudi Arabian television channel launched in 2003

- Logo used since 2010
- Type: Satellite television
- Country: Saudi Arabia
- Broadcast area: Middle East and North Africa (main audience free-to-air); Horn of Africa (peripheral free-to-air via satellite); United States and Europe (pay-TV)
- Headquarters: Riyadh, Saudi Arabia

Programming
- Languages: Arabic (subtitles); English (audio)
- Picture format: 1080i (HDTV) (downscaled to 16:9 576i for the SDTV feed)

Ownership
- Owner: MBC Group
- Sister channels: Al Arabiya; Al Hadath; Wanasah; MBC 1; MBC 3; MBC 4; MBC 5; MBC Action; MBC Drama; MBC Max; MBC Persia; MBC Bollywood; MBC Masr; MBC Masr 2; MBC Masr Drama; MBC Iraq

History
- Launched: 12 January 2003; 23 years ago
- Former names: Channel 2

Availability

Streaming media
- MBC Shahid: Watch online (HD)
- YouTube: Official YouTube channel

MBC 2 (Arabic: إم بي سي 2) is a free-to-air Saudi Arabian television channel owned by the media conglomerate MBC Group. It originally broadcast a variety of films and TV programs subtitled in Arabic. Following the launch of MBC 4, the channel shifted its focus exclusively to movies, specializing in American films subtitled in Arabic. It targets viewers across the Middle East and North Africa and is considered one of the most prominent movie channels in the region.

MBC 2 primarily broadcasts Hollywood movies but occasionally features films from other countries, including British, Canadian, French, Korean, and others. The channel has secured long-term deals with major Hollywood studios, ensuring first-run rights and a steady stream of top box-office films. It mainly targets Arabic-speaking audiences, particularly young adults, and enjoys wide popularity among Arab viewers across the region. MBC 2 HD was launched on 1 July 2011, offering high-definition broadcasts of the channel's content.

== Programming ==
=== Shows ===
- 4N1K
- Al Anisa Farah
- Scoop with Raya By Raya Abirached
- Entertainment Tonight
- The 1001 Seasons of Elie Saab
- A-List Lifestyle
- Action Zone
- Box Office Top 5
- Beauty Pulse
- Home Shopping
- Beyoncé: Lemonade
- One Direction: This Is Us
- Katy Perry: Part of Me
- Justin Bieber: Never Say Never
- Comedy Movies
- Citruss TV
- Celebrity Scoop
- Celebrity Scrapbook
- Celebrity Style Story
- Chat The Planet
- Stars in Style
- Famous Foodies
- Fashion Forward
- Films & Stars
- Unbreakable
- Hollywood Buzz
- Making the Movies
- Ocean's
- MBC Movie Guide
- Must Haves
- Planet Action
- ReelTalk
- Raya With The Stars
- Sawalef Hollywood
- Stars and News
- Stars & News
- Scoop
- Scoop Box Office
- Scoop Network
- Scoop On Runway
- Scoop On Set
- The Twilight Saga (film series)
- Box Office America
- The Insider
- Young Hollywood's Greatest...
- Young Hollywood Presents: Evolution of…
- Box Office Top 5
- Scoop
- Scoop Box Office
- Scoop Network
- Scoop On Runway
- Scoop On Set
- On Set

== Special events ==
- Academy Awards
- British Academy Film Awards
- Golden Globe Awards

=== Past special events ===
- The 1001 Seasons of Elie Saab (2024)
- Life is a Dream (2025)
- Grease: Live (2016)

== Films ==
=== Film blocks ===
- Monday Movie Premieres : Mondays 11 p.m. KSA / 10 p.m. CLT
- Star of the Month : Tuesdays 11 p.m. KSA / 10 p.m. CLT
- Big Family Night : Wednesdays 7 p.m. KSA / 6 p.m. CLT
- Friday Mega Movie : Fridays 9 p.m. KSA / 8 p.m. CLT
- Screaming Sunday : Sundays 2 a.m. KSA / 1 a.m. CLT
- Thursday Chiller : Thursdays 1 a.m. KSA / 12 a.m. CLT
- Screaming Sunday : Sundays 1:30 a.m. KSA / 12:30 a.m. CLT

== Logos ==
2003 – 2010

2010 – present

2011 – present (HD branding)

== See also ==
- Cinema of Saudi Arabia
- Television in Saudi Arabia
