= Rotana Cinema =

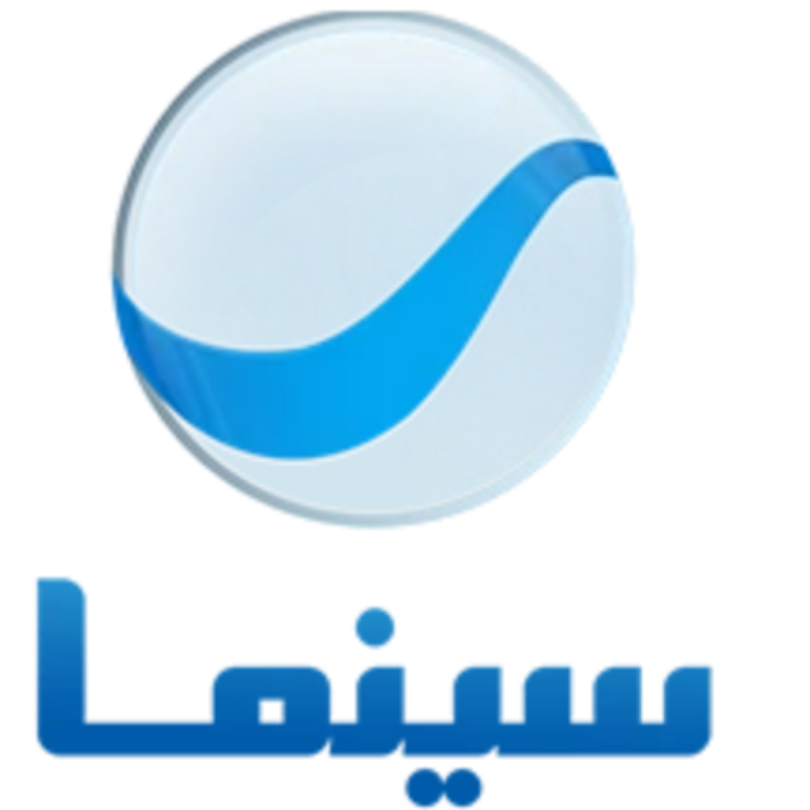
- Country: Saudi Arabia and Egypt
- Broadcast area: Middle East & North Africa
- Network: Rotana
- Headquarters: Dubai, United Arab Emirates, Cairo

Programming
- Picture format: 576i (SDTV); 1080i (HDTV)

Ownership
- Owner: Rotana Group

History
- Launched: 31 December 2004; 22 years ago

Rotana Cinema (Arabic: روتانا سينما) is a Saudi Arabian free-to-air satellite television channel owned by Rotana Group network. It was launched in 2004, and broadcasts exclusively old and contemporary Egyptian films.

Rotana Cinema has the largest and richest Arabic movie library in the world; this channel broadcasts premium production films ranging from golden oldies to the latest blockbusters that have never been broadcast on TV, making it the first channel to use the direct-to-TV method by fast forwarding the period between a movie's premiere in theaters and the TV premiere

Since 2005, Rotana Cinema has established itself as the Arab family's very own cinema at home and is set to continue solidifying that position through its 1000+ films not yet seen on TV and its exclusive premiers. The channel airs more than 35 premiere movies per year directly from the cinema to the television.

== Al Nashra Al Fanneya ==
Al Nashra Al Fanneya is a popular entertainment program in the Arab world and is considered the source of all the latest entertainment industry news in the region. It provides the viewers with the latest news and updates on their favorite artists and the upcoming productions in both TV and Cinema.

== Slogan ==
Its slogan, translated into English, means "you won't be able to blink your eyes" (Egyptian Arabic: مش هتقدر تغمض عينيك). This slogan has become part of the Arab pop culture especially since the channel's ratings are the highest in the history of the Arab movie channels.

== Logo ==
The logo has undergone periodic face-lifts since the channels launch. First, the logo was green and white, with grey/gray text, then it became white and blue with blue text that looked stretched out compared to the previous logo before it. After that, the final current logo made the text look a little less stretched-out and was given a lighter shade of blue.
