= Television in Saudi Arabia =

Television in Saudi Arabia was introduced in 1965 (after limited launches in 1955 and 1957), but is now dominated by just five major companies: Middle East Broadcasting Center, SM Enterprise TV, Lebanese Broadcasting Corporation, Rotana and Saudi TV. Together, they control 80% of the pan-Arab broadcasting market. Saudi Arabia is a major market for pan-Arab satellite and pay-TV. Saudi investors are behind the major networks MBC, which is based in Dubai, and Emirates based OSN. The Saudi government estimated that in 2000 the average Saudi spent 50% to 100% more time watching television than their European or US counterpart. On average, 2.7 hours are spent daily watching TV in Saudi Arabia.

The pay-TV market in Saudi Arabia is big, with a penetration estimated at 21%. beIN Sports is one of the largest pay-TV players in terms of subscriptions, with a market share of 59%.

== History ==
The first television broadcasts in Saudi Arabia originated from a 200-watt television station, AJL-TV, "The Eye of the Desert". These were English-language programs for the personnel of the USAF Dhahran Airfield, and started on 17 June 1955. The programming was from contemporary American television, but all references to Christianity, Israel or alcohol were edited out. In September 1957, ARAMCO began a television service for its 9,000 employees in Dhahran; that service would cease operations on 31 December 1998. The first state owned television channel Al Saudiya would launch on 7 July 1965.

Women were completely prohibited from appearing on screen at first, but as the country completely lacked a theater tradition, Saudi television had to import programs, forcing restrictions to loosen slightly. Adultery was discouraged, and criminals had to be punished. Saudi Arabia refused to buy television programs from Egypt, the main source of programs in the Arab world, so Lebanese productions—designed to not cause cultural offense—sold well. Nawal Baksh was the first Saudi woman to appear on Saudi television, in 1966.

Prior to the introduction of satellite broadcasting, Saudi TV channels One and Two had a reach of 60% of the adult Saudi population. The exception was with regard to Eastern Province audiences who traditionally tuned into Bahrain TV.

Arab satellite first became available in 1985 with the launching of Arabsat, but it was not until the 1990s that satellite television became commercially viable. Accessibility of Western entertainment and news programs had a profound effect, as the foreign programs were instantly popular, leading Saudi TV to respond with more programs, including a live political talk show in which senior officials responded to questions by viewers.

The first private satellite channel in the Arab world, the Middle East Broadcasting Centre, was founded in 1991. In the early 1990s, King Fahd began to invest in the television business through Abdul Aziz Al Ibrahim and Khalid Al Ibrahim, the brothers of Al-Johara, his favourite wife. Other private channels soon followed, led for the most part by Saudis and Lebanese. By 2003, there were 15 private Arab satellite television channels, four of them owned by Saudis.

By the mid-2000s, many women presented shows on Saudi television. After trials in 2004 and 2005 in Jeddah, Digital Terrestrial Television launched in July 2006 and covered five major cities. To continue DTT transition and extend the service across the Kingdom, the Ministry of Culture and Information signed a contract with Thomson in May 2008. By 2010, its network of 100 digital terrestrial broadcasting towers covered nearly 90% of the population. However, probably due to the adoption of multichannel TV on satellite, the uptake of DTT remains limited; in 2012 it was estimated at 1% of total households.

== State-managed stations ==
The terrestrial broadcast sector in Saudi Arabia is state-owned through the Ministry of Media. The state-run Broadcasting Services of the Kingdom of Saudi Arabia operates almost all domestic broadcasting outlets. State-run television consists of four channels: Saudi One, the main channel in Arabic launched in 1963; Saudi Two, an English language channel; Al Riyadiah, a sports channel; and the news channel Al Ekhbariya.

Government-owned terrestrial television has changed little since 1969. Its programming is still predominantly focused on educational, entertainment, and religious subjects. Reruns of Arabic-language cinema, particularly Egyptian movies, are also broadcast. Political content other than official government announcements has remained relatively limited.

== Programming ==
Kalam Nawaaem, a popular female-hosted Arabic talkshow discussing various societal topics, and Arab Idol, both showing on MBC, are the most popular TV programs in Saudi Arabia. Sada Al Malaeb, a sports talkshow, is the third preferred show. Turkish drama series also capture a strong following.

== Most-viewed channels ==
Average daily reach, total Arab population, March 2024

Position	Channel	Network
1	Al Arabiya	Middle East Broadcasting Center
2	MBC 1	Middle East Broadcasting Center
3	Dubai TV	Dubai Media Incorporated
4	MBC Drama	Middle East Broadcasting Center
5	Saudi TV	Saudi Broadcasting Authority
6	SSC	MBC
7	Rotana Khalijiah	Rotana Group
8	Al Ekhbaria	Saudi Broadcasting Authority
9	Iqraa TV	Orbit Showtime Network
10	Zee Alwan	Zee Entertainment Enterprises
11	B4U Aflam	B4U Network
12	Zee TV	Zee Entertainment Enterprises
13	Star Plus	Star India

== List of channels ==
- Al Arabiya
- Al Hadath
- Asharq News
- Altaqafeya
- MBC1
- MBC2
- MBC3
- MBC4
- MBC Max
- MBC Drama
- Al Saudiya
- SBC
- Thikrayat TV
- Quran TV
- Sunna TV
- SSC | 1
- SSC | 2
- SSC | 3
- SSC | 4
- SSC | 5
- KSA Sports 1
- KSA Sports 2
- KSA Sports 3
- KSA Sports 4
- Iqraa
- Rotana Clip
- Rotana Khalijiah
- Rotana Comedy
- Rotana Drama
- Rotana Cinema
- Rotana Kids
- Rotana Mousica
- Al Resalah
- Al-Majd Satellite
- Al-Majd Hadeeth
- Al-Majd Quran
- Al-Majd Illmiya
- Al Dal Radio
- Al-Majd Doucementary
- Al-Majd Nature
- Al-Majd News Service
- Al-Majd Kids
- Al-Majd Zaman
- Besma
- Rawdah
- Taghared
- Masah
- Al Ajawed

== See also ==
- Lists of television channels
- Censorship in Saudi Arabia#Film and television
- Takki Series (Saudi Arabia)
