= MBC 1 (Saudi TV channel) =

Saudi Arabian television channel launched in 1991

- Type: Satellite television
- Country: Saudi Arabia
- Broadcast area: Arab world (main audience free-to-air); Horn of Africa (peripheral free-to-air via satellite); United States and Europe (pay-TV)
- Headquarters: Riyadh, Saudi Arabia

Programming
- Languages: Arabic, English
- Picture format: 1080i (HDTV); 576i (SDTV)

Ownership
- Owner: MBC Group
- Sister channels: Al Arabiya Al Hadath Wanasah MBC 2 MBC 3 MBC 4 MBC 5 MBC Persia MBC Action MBC Drama MBC Max MBC Bollywood MBC Masr MBC Masr 2 MBC Masr Drama MBC Iraq

History
- Launched: 18 September 1991; 35 years ago

Availability

Streaming media
- MBC Shahid: Watch Online (HD)
- YouTube: Official YouTube channel

MBC 1 (Arabic: إم بي سي 1) is a free-to-air Saudi Arabian general entertainment television channel. It is owned by the media conglomerate MBC Group, and targets viewers across the Middle East and North Africa. It is headquartered in Riyadh, Saudi Arabia, and is considered one of the most popular television channels in the Arab world.

== Shows and programs ==
=== Programs ===
- Sada Almala'eb
- You Deserve It 2012
- Arab Idol (2011–2017)
- The Wall Game Show (2010/2018)
- Arabs Got Talent
- ET bel Arabia
- Good Morning Arabs
- Kalam Nawaem
- MasterChef Junior
- Nadeena Show
- Project Runway Middle East
- The Voice: Ahla Sawt
- The Voice Kids: Ahla Sawt
- The X Factor Arabia
- Top Chef Middle East and North Africa (2011–2023)

=== Events and award shows ===
- Joy Awards
- Riyadh Season
- Red Sea International Film Festival
- JOY FORUM

=== Sports ===
- Bundesliga

== See also ==
- Cinema of Saudi Arabia
- Television in Saudi Arabia
