= MBC 3 =

Saudi Arabian television channel launched in 2004

- Type: Satellite television
- Country: Saudi Arabia
- Broadcast area: Middle East and North Africa (main audience free-to-air); Afghanistan (formerly); Horn of Africa (peripheral free-to-air via satellite); United States and Europe (pay-TV)
- Headquarters: Riyadh, Saudi Arabia

Programming
- Languages: Arabic; English
- Picture format: 1080i (HDTV) (downscaled to 16:9 576i for the SDTV feed)

Ownership
- Owner: MBC Group
- Sister channels: Al Arabiya Al Hadath MBC 1 MBC 2 MBC 4 MBC 5 MBC Persia MBC Action MBC Drama MBC Max MBC Bollywood MBC Masr MBC Masr 2 MBC Masr Drama MBC Iraq

History
- Launched: 8 December 2004; 21 years ago

Links
- Website: mbc3.mbc.net

Availability

Streaming media
- MBC Shahid: Watch Online (HD)
- YouTube: Official YouTube channel

MBC 3 (Arabic: إم بي سي 3) is a free-to-air Saudi Arabian children's television channel owned by the MBC Group. It primarily targets viewers under the age of 15 across the Middle East and North Africa. The channel broadcasts international animated and live-action children's programming dubbed into Arabic and is also known for producing a variety of original children's shows and educational content.

== History ==
The channel was launched on 8 December 2004 at 10:00 am. Its branding was designed by the UK design house Turquoise since 8 December 2004-8 December 2005.

MBC 3 first began airing Nickelodeon shows in 2000s and 2010s. This includes Nicktoons such as SpongeBob SquarePants, and The Fairly OddParents, and every Nickelodeon content (except for live-actions) all dubbed in Arabic. Nick Jr. programming includes Paw Patrol, Go, Diego, Go!, Yo Gabba Gabba!, Dora the Explorer, Team Umizoomi, and Blue's Clues.

On 8 December 2005-now, MBC 3 underwent a rebranding to mark its 1st anniversary. The update introduced a new mascot, a green cube named “Cubee.” The new look was designed by the German animation studio LIGA 01 Computerfilm and is considered the channel's most iconic design.

On 18 September 2017, the channel received a major rebrand featuring a comic strip background, with on-screen graphics adopting a comic book aesthetic. This design is currently in use alongside the previous bumpers.

In July 2019, the MBC 3 website was rebranded from its old style to a comic-inspired design.

On 23 March 2020, MBC 3 updated its on-screen logo. The new logo resembled the modern design, but the number 3 was displayed outside the cube.

From 24 March to 22 June 2020, during the COVID-19 pandemic, MBC 3 used a logo featuring a house on-screen and slogans معاكم بالبيت (With you at home).

In late December 2023, the official MBC 3 website was shut down and redirected to the official MBC Group website.

== Censorship ==
Although in the early days of 2004-2007 the channel aired content somewhat uncensored at first, later on, possibly due to pressure and complaints from conservative audiences, in the late-2007 and beyond, MBC 3 started an increase in threeamount of censorship just of jump-cuts, skipping s and bannings only to make it suitable for islamic and Saudi/Emirati audiences. For example, scenes involving weddings & marriage, LGBTQIA+ content, visual romance outside of marriage, pork meat, boat meat, piglet meat, swine meat, pig meat, kissing before marriage scenes, awkward angles of female characters, sensual scenes between members of the opposite sex, cross-dressed men, references to alcohol and gambling, references to non-Islamic religious content and visually-grotesque scenes are censored. However, the channel does not have a proper consensus of its censoring policy, featuring cuts that are so heavily edited it renders plot continuities inconsistent. While they accidentally aired content that is fully uncensored in this 2013 until 2016.

== Television hosts ==
- Mouhannad Bakhit
- Asalla Kamel
- Hasan Al Mulla
- Dania Shaafai
- Azza Zaarour

== Channel Frequency ==
- Eutelsat 8 West B 11470 V 27500 5/6 SD (Middle East Only)
- Eutelsat 7 West A 11559 V 27500 5/6 SD (North Africa Only)
- Badr 7 11270 V 27500 5/6 SD Middle East Only)
- Badr 8 12284 V 27500 5/6 SD (North Africa Only)
- Badr 8 12399 V 27500 3/4 HD (GOBX Only)
