= MBC Group =

Saudi Arabian media conglomerate

- Native name: مجموعة إم بي سي
- Formerly: Middle East Broadcasting Center (1991–2003)
- Type: Public
- Traded as: Tadawul: 4072
- Industry: Mass media
- Founded: 18 September 1991; 35 years ago
- Headquarters: Riyadh, Saudi Arabia
- Area served: Middle East and North Africa and Horn of Africa
- Key people: Waleed bin Ibrahim (Chairman); Mike Sneesby (CEO)
- Owner: Public Investment Fund (54%); Waleed bin Ibrahim (36%)
- Subsidiaries: MBC Studios; MBC Media Solutions; MBC Academy
- Website: www.mbc.net

MBC Group (Note: Arabic: مجموعة إم بي سي (romanized: Majmūʿat ʾIm Bī Sī); formerly known as Middle East Broadcasting Center (مركز تلفزيون الشرق الأوسط, Markaz Tilifizyūn al-Sharq al-ʾAwsaṭ)) is a Saudi media conglomerate, and is considered one of the largest broadcasting groups in the Middle East and North Africa. It was launched in 1991 by Saudi businessman Waleed bin Ibrahim, who serves as its chairman. The group is majority owned by the Public Investment Fund., a Saudi state-owned entity.

== History ==
MBC Group was founded in London in 1991 with the launch of MBC 1, the first private Arabic satellite channel. The group expanded to Dubai in 2002.

In 2011, MBC reported 165 million viewers.

MBC Hope launched in June 2013 to handle social engagement campaigns like "Syrians without an address" and "Stars on board." In 2017, it expanded to Egypt to support female entrepreneurs.

In 2022, MBC relocated to Riyadh and expanded its operations. The group now oversees Shahid (largest Arabic streaming platform), 19+ TV/radio channels, MBC Studios, MBC Academy, and MBC Talent Agency.

MBC partners with telecoms and international production studios, and also develops projects in video games, NFTs, and digital currencies.

In 2023, 60% of MBC group was owned by Istedamah Holding Company (a subsidiary of the Saudi government's Ministry of Finance), with the rest belonging to its founder Waleed bin Ibrahim Al Ibrahim. In 2023, MBC Group announced its initial public offering (IPO). The offering consisted of a primary offering of 33,250,000 new ordinary shares, representing 10% of the company's share capital post-listing. This move marked a significant step in the company's financial strategy and opened up new avenues for investment and growth. By October 2024, the stake owned by Istedamah had dropped to 54%, and this stake was transferred to the Public Investment Fund in November 2024.

In 2023, total revenue reached SAR 3.7 billion (+6.2%) and net profit SAR 69 million (+44.8%). 60% of MBC was owned by Istedamah Holding Company (Saudi Ministry of Finance subsidiary) and the rest by Waleed bin Ibrahim Al Ibrahim.

MBC announced its IPO on the Tadawul in November 2023, with a share price range of SAR 23–25. The IPO raised SAR 831 million with huge demand.

Following the IPO, shares rose 30% on debut (Jan 8, 2024) and 134% by Jan 25, 2024. 2024 revenue: SAR 4.2 billion (+13.1%); net profit SAR 426.1 million (+515.2%).

In September 2025, the PIF became a major shareholder, acquiring 54% through Istedamah Holding Company for SAR 7.469 billion.

== Television channels ==
Current MBC Group television channels
Channel	launched	Description	Ref
Al Arabiya	2003	International Arabic-language news channel.	
Al Hadath	2012	News channel covering political developments and breaking news.	
MBC 1	1991	General entertainment channel featuring family shows, talent programs, and drama.	
MBC 2	2003	Hollywood and international movie channel.	
MBC 3	2004	Children's channel offering educational and entertainment programming.	
MBC 4	2005	Entertainment channel airing series, talk shows, and programs for women.	
MBC 5	2019	Entertainment content for Moroccan and Maghreb viewers.	
MBC Action	2007	Action series, films, and sports programming.	
MBC Drama	2010	24-hour Arabic drama channel broadcasting series from across the Arab world.	
MBC Masr Drama	2025	Egyptian drama channel with locally produced series.	
MBC Max	2008	Movie channel airing Western and international films.	
MBC Bollywood	2013	24-hour Hindi cinema channel subtitled or dubbed in Arabic.	
MBC Persia	2008	Persian-language channel broadcasting films and series.	
MBC Masr	2012	Entertainment channel for Egyptian viewers.	
MBC Masr 2	2014	Alternative entertainment channel for Egyptian viewers.	
MBC Iraq	2019	Entertainment channel for Iraqi viewers with localized content.	
MBC Mood	2026	Saudi music channel	

== Streaming platform ==
MBC Shahid is the first free video on demand service in the Middle East and North Africa and one of the region’s streaming platforms, offering the largest library of Arabic content. It is also a premium video on demand service globally outside China, the US, and India and operates as an over‑the‑top streaming platform delivering content directly over the internet.

Shahid features MBC's own shows along with dubbed or subtitled foreign content. In January 2020, it partnered with Disney and Fox to add over 3,000 hours of content, including Star Wars, Marvel, and Disney classics such as Frozen, alongside nine new Arabic originals.

In December 2024, Shahid led the subscription video‑on‑demand market in the Middle East and North Africa with approximately 4.4 million subscribers, ahead of competitors such as YouTube Premium and Netflix.

== Radio stations ==
MBC FM logo

MBC Group radio stations
Station	launched	Description	Ref
MBC Loud FM	2023	English-language radio station airing contemporary Western music. It is the first international contemporary hit radio (CHR) station in Saudi Arabia.	
MBC FM	1994	Arabic-language radio station broadcasting local and Gulf music, talk shows, competitions, and local news coverage in Saudi Arabia.	
Panorama FM	2005	Arabic-language radio station focusing on contemporary Arabic music along with entertainment programs.	

== Subsidiaries ==
=== MBC Studios ===
In 2018, MBC established its own production studio to produce film and television series targeting at Middle-Eastern audiences. MBC Studios later expanded to work with Hollywood studios to produce English-language features.

MBC Studios has established global partnerships with major international production studios in Hollywood And London to launch joint film and television projects, most notably the film Desert Warrior, a co-production between MBC Studios and JB Pictures. The film stars Anthony Mackie, Aiysha Hart, Sir Ben Kingsley, Sharlto Copley, Ghassan Massoud, Sami Bouajila, and Lamis Ammar, and is directed by Rupert Wyatt. The screenplay was co-written by Rupert Wyatt, Erica Beeney, and David Self, and the film's main scenes were shot in the Saudi Arabian cities of NEOM and Tabuk with support from the NEOM Media Industries sector. It is scheduled to have its Middle East and North Africa premiere at the Red Sea International Film Festival in Jeddah in 2025, following its world premiere at the Zurich Film Festival in September 2025 in Switzerland. The film Kandahar, starring Gerard Butler, was also filmed in Saudi Arabia.

MBC Studios also produces Arabic works with international standards and broadcasts them globally, such as the crime drama series "Rashash" and "Rise of the Witches." In Ramadan/April 2025, MBC 1 aired the series "Muawiya," produced by MBC Studios, which is considered one of the largest historical productions in Arabic drama. In September of the same year, the Venice International Film Festival hosted the premiere of the film "The Voice of Hind Rajab," which was co-produced by MBC Studios alongside a number of major Hollywood and international studios, and was written and directed by the Tunisian Kaouther Ben Hania.

== Reception ==
In 2007, MBC aired its first Turkish soap opera dubbed into Arabic. These shows became very popular, with over 85 million viewers watching the finale of Gümüş. In 2018, all Turkish programs were removed, reportedly under Saudi government direction.

In 2017, several MBC owners were arrested in Riyadh during a corruption crackdown. Chief owner Waleed bin Ibrahim was released after 83 days and found innocent.

In 2018–2019, MBC Masr faced criticism for blackface in comedy programs.

In October 2024, MBC aired a report labeling Yahya Sinwar, Hamas leader Ismail Haniyeh, Hezbollah's Hassan Nasrallah, PMF commander Abu Mahdi al-Muhandis, and Quds Force commander Qasem Soleimani as "faces of terrorism." This led to office vandalism in Baghdad and the suspension of MBC licenses in Iraq and Algeria.

== See also ==
- Television in Saudi Arabia
- Lists of television channels
- List of television networks by country
