= MBC Shahid =

Arab content streaming platform

MBC Shahid إم بي سي شاهد
- Website type: OTT platform
- Available in: Arabic; English; French
- Founded: 2008; 2011 (official)
- Headquarters: Riyadh, Saudi Arabia
- Country of origin: Saudi Arabia
- Area served: Worldwide
- Owner: MBC Group
- Industry: Entertainment; mass media
- Services: Streaming media; video on demand; digital distribution
- Website: shahid.mbc.net
- Registration: Required
- Current status: Active

MBC Shahid (Arabic: إم بي سي شاهد) is a Saudi Arabian content-streaming platform created and operated by the MBC Group, It is the most-watched Arabic streaming service in the Middle East and North Africa, offering a wide range of entertainment content, including movies, TV shows, original productions, and sports events.

== History ==
The platform was launched in 2008 by MBC Group and rebranded in 2020. More than 27 million unique monthly users were reported by the end of Ramadan 2019, and it managed to capture a market share of 85% VOD viewership in the MENA. The senior management of Shahid consists of Sam

MBC Group's CEO Saudi Arabian businessman Waleed Al-Ibrahim is the founder and chairman of MBC Group, which launched Shahid.

== Timeline ==
=== Launch, revamp and rebranding ===
It was launched in 2008 titled MBC Shahid Online, a platform created to allow MBC users to view its TV programmes at their own convenience. The platform only had archives of the MBC's content and served as a catch-up service for MBC's channels.

2009 – Launched www.Shahid.net

In 2009, MBC extended Shahid Online to Shahid.net – a free Video on Demand streaming platform (AVOD), which was made available in multiple regions. In July 2012, the Shahid app was launched and it reached the top of the App store in the Middle East and North Africa in one week.

2014 – Introduced SVOD service

The premium subscription-based service 'Shahid PLUS' (now Shahid VIP) was launched in 2014, which provided users with a variant of the free video on demand (VOD) service. Thereby, it allowed subscribers to view all the available content without the interruption of any advertisements.

In 2019, the platform provided the audiences outside the MENA region access to the regular MBC programmes. The first episode of all the shows was made available for free, while the rest of the episodes were available through the subscription service of Shahid PLUS. This resulted in twofold increase in unique users outside of the MENA region.

2020 – Revamp and rebranding - Shahid VIP, the premium subscription-based service

In 2020, Shahid VIP went through rebranding and technical advancement. The revamped Shahid was launched during a ceremony held at the Dubai Opera on January 15, 2020. The Burj Khalifa was lit up with the slogan 'It's our Time' marking the launch of the rebranded platform.

The offerings of the platform in both the free (Shahid) and paid tier (Shahid VIP) were re-strategized. The paid tier was rebranded as 'Shahid VIP' and the platform increased the ease of viewing, speed, quality of streaming, improved discoverability of the relevant content by providing access through mobile phones and various large TV screens using Chromecast and AirPlay functionality; followed by the launch of its app on all major connected TV platforms — Smart TVs and streaming players. The rebranding included new features such as the English interface for the platform and login functionality using mobile number or Apple ID. The video streaming service also transitioned to the cloud infrastructure. Shahid VIP launched its branded remote control button in October 2020.

== Shahid VIP partnerships ==
Shahid VIP has entered several strategic partnerships with various companies. A partnership with telecom operator Viva in 2015 allowed subscribers to make payments through their mobile phones.

In 2018, Shahid VIP entered a partnership with Omantel, the telecom provider in Oman, granting its users access to Shahid PLUS subscription. In 2020, it partnered with Vodafone Egypt to give Vodafone subscribers access to Shahid VIP without additional costs. In Saudi Arabia, Shahid VIP content is made available through Saudi Telecom Company (STC) following their partnership in May 2020, with all STC users receiving a complimentary two-month subscription to Shahid VIP.

Shahid also partnered with Samsung in 2014, enabling users to access Shahid VIP's content through the Shahid.net app. TCL extended Shahid VIP's content in 2018 for its TV users in MENA markets via the Shahid app. Sony TV MENA started integrating the Shahid app into its new TVs from May 2020. Shahid VIP can be accessed on all VIDAA Smart OS-powered Hisense smart TVs globally, as well as on select Toshiba, Tornado, Wansa, and G-guard models. Additionally, streaming devices like Amazon Fire TV, Apple TV, and Xiaomi Mi Box support Shahid VIP programming through the Shahid app.

== Entertainment Content ==
Shahid provides original and premium content along with content from the media partners.

=== Shahid originals ===
Shahid started with its originals productions in 2019, making the premium Arabic content available to its subscribers on Shahid VIP. The first Shahid Original series was 'El Diva', a drama series with Cyrine Abdel Nour and Yacob Alfarhan. Other Shahid Original series include: Every Week has a Friday, Lock Down, Khrays, This is Earth, Al Shak, Fixer, Karimophobia, Blood Oath, Beirut 6:07, The Thief, The Case, Mamlakat Iblis, Al Daheeh Museum, This Other Thing, Fixer, The Building, and many more.

=== Shahid premieres ===
Shahid VIP Premieres include coming soon MBC shows and dramas added to the platform with an exclusive preview window prior to going on-air on MBC TV channels. Once aired, the content remains available for binge watching on Shahid VIP. Some of Shahid Premieres include: "Wasiyat Badr", "Aswad Fateh", "Bodyguard", "La Hokm Alayh", "Leh La'a", "AL Leiba season 1 & 2", "Adani AL Aib", "Dantelle", "Bloodline", "DNA" and many more.

=== Arabic movies ===
Shahid also features Arabic movies, which are exclusively available on Shahid VIP directly after theatrical release. Shahid VIP introduced the concept of pre-theatrical release of movies in the region with the release of the first pre-theatrical film 'Saheb El Makam', starring Yousra and Asser Yassin.

=== Previews ===
Shahid previews include series and titles that are released first on Shahid VIP with a preview window of 24h before they are aired on one of the MBC channels allowing subscribers to watch them first on Shahid VIP. Some previews include: "Arous Beirut" (Seasons 1 and 2), "Al Hayba" (including all-new Season 4), Abshar Bel Saad and much more.

=== Live TV ===
Live streaming of all MBC TV channels is available on the platform, including MBC 1, MBC 2, MBC 3, MBC 4, MBC 5, MBC Action, MBC Max, MBC Persia, MBC Bollywood, and MBC Drama. Rotana TV channels are also streamed live on Shahid VIP. These include Rotana Cinema, Rotana Khalijiah, Rotana+, Rotana Classic, Rotana Kids, Rotana Drama, and Rotana Music.

The Lebanese Broadcasting Corporation (LBCI) started streaming on the platform in July 2020. Al Arabiya, Wanasah, and Panorama FM, as well as Cartoon Network and Spacetoon are also streamed live on Shahid.

=== Western and international content ===
Shahid VIP has partnered with Disney and Fox to offer their extensive content on the platform, which is around 3000 hours long including the animated classics, the Marvel series, and Star Wars. The content is made available with Arabic subtitles. In addition, Shahid offers a library of Hollywood and Japanese titles.

=== Documentaries and real-life stories ===
Shahid VIP offers Arabic documentaries including Al Arabiya Documentaries. In 2020, Shahid VIP signed a partnership with iwonder, Asia-Pacific's subscription video on demand (SVOD) platform dedicated to factual films, documentaries, and real-life stories.

=== Content for Kids ===
Shahid VIP provides Kids programming through live feed from Kids linear channels MBC 3, CN, Spacetoon and Rotana Kids. The platform provides special parental control features to ensure safe watching. Shahid VIP struck a deal with Warner Media in 2020 to bring Cartoon Network Arabia on board. Entertainment and educational content from MBC 3, Spacetoon, Pixar and Nickelodeon is also streamed on Shahid VIP.

== Sports Content ==
=== Football ===
- Bundesliga
- Copa del Rey
- Supercopa de España
- Coppa Italia

=== Motorsport ===
- Dakar Rally
- Formula E
- Extreme E
- 24 Hours of Le Mans

=== Other sports ===
- Handball-Bundesliga
- IHF Men's Super Globe
- Baseball United
- Saudi Basketball Premier League
- Saudi Handball League
- Professional Fighters League (including MENA tournament)
- Saudi Ladies International
- Saudi International
- Aramco Team Series
- FIBA 3X3 World Tour
- Saudi Cup
- Saudi Tour
- Tour of Oman
- Riyadh Marathon
- World Snooker Championship
- Sail GP
- LIV Golf
- Saudi Games

== User acquisition and growth rate ==
In 2019, by the end of Ramadan, Shahid gathered 27 million unique monthly users, which reflected an increase of 23% in the audience scale as compared to same time period 2018. During this time, the platform received more than 248 million views, a 46% increase on Shahid and 62% increase in Shahid VIP subscribers.

Growth after rebranding and relaunch

The rebranding in 2020 increased Shahid VIP subscribers by tenfold, with 60 percent increase in the International audiences from United States, Canada, United Kingdom, Australia, Germany, France, Sweden and a few other territories in Europe. The brand awareness was measured through brand analysis in KSA, UAE and Egypt with the first phase conducted in December 2019 prior to the relaunch and second phase in March 2020 after the re-launch in January 2020, which showed that the increase in the brand awareness got translated into new users' acquisition. The expansion to various screen sizes increased viewership to 70% on Shahid VIP, which come from mobile devices and almost 50% of playbacks take place on large screen TVs.

Shahid VIP launched in North America and Australia

Shahid VIP became available in North America on November 1, 2020, giving the Arabic population residing in the US and Canada access to more than 25,000 hours of Arabic content including Shahid Original series, Shahid Premieres, a large library of movies, as well as live Arab TV channels.

Available and streaming worldwide including in UK and Europe

Shahid VIP also rolled out to parts of UK and Europe after its rebranding in January 2020.

== See also ==
- WATCH IT
- List of streaming media services
