= Hisham Algakh =

Modern Egyptian poet (born 1978)

Hisham Kamel Abbas Mahmood Algakh is an Egyptian poet who has worked to make Egyptian poetry more accessible to young people and children.

Algakh has written more than 55 poems, most of which are written in an informal Egyptian dialect. All of his poems are spoken. He published his first collection of poems, "al-dīwān al-awwal" in Cairo International Book Fair in 2017.

Algakh has read his poetry in numerous concert events in the Middle East, North Africa and Western Europe.

== Early years ==
- Algakh was born on 1st 1978 October in the governorate Sohag, Egypt. His family came upper Egypt with Kenawy roots. He belongs to Al Houwara tribe, in Abu Tesht in governorate Qena.
- Algakh studied in Sohag then obtained his bachelor's degree in business at Ain Shams University in 2003. He was appointed supervisor on Ain Shams University cultural office on graduation. Algakh received his master's degree in business administration from the same university in 2007
- Algakh resigned from Ain Shams in 2009 to work solely on his poetry. He was named the best young colloquial poet by the Egyptian writers union in 2008. He won second place in the Prince of Poets contest in Abu Dhabi in 2011.

== Literary career ==
- Algakh is also known for his poetry parties, blend music with poetry and rhythmic movements on stage.
- Algakh's poems in the formal and informal Egyptian language, which became popular due to his ongoing presence in Arab media, These poems include some of which are: (al-ta'shīrah), (Juḥā(, (away bi-ghayr), (Īzīs), (Khirfān(, (ākhar mā horref fī al-Tawrāh), (matzaʻalish), (Tabaʻan ma saletish al-ʻAshā(, (al-jadwal), (Mashhad raʼsī min Mīdān al-Taḥrīr). Algakh's poem "Al Madfara", contains parts in formal language and others in informal.
- He performed his first Jamahiriya poetic event, with music, in 2010, in El Sawy Culture Wheel. By 2016, he had performed Jamahiriya Poetic events in all the Egyptian states.
- Algakh published his first collection of poems in Cairo International Book Fair in 2017 under the name "al-dīwān al-awwal".

== Poems ==
- A'auad.
- Luqaṭah al-Firāq raqm 105.
- Tabaʻan ma saletish al-ʻAshā.
- Khamsah al-ṣubḥ.
- Ḥamzah
- al-mukālamah.
- Anā Ikhwān.
- Malik al-niḥal.
- 24 shāriʻ al-Ḥijāz.
- ikhtilāf.
- -ākhar mā horref fī al-Tawrāh.
- Īzīs.
- al-ta'shīrah.
- 3 Khirfān.
- Rithāʼ juairia.
- al-jadwal.
- Mazhoum yā Qatr al-ghalbānin.
- Mamadetish ‘idi lahadd.
- ʻalá dhikr Āl al-Nabī.

== Jamahiriya concerts ==
The poet Hisham Algakh performed many Jamahiriya parties in poetry nights, conventions, festivals, universities all over the Middle East region.

He has also performed in Brussels in Belgium, Geneva in Switzerland, Vienna in Austria, and Paris in France.

== Festivals ==
Name of fair	Place	Date
Sharjah Expo International Book Fair	UAE	November 2010
Hala Feb Fair	Kuwait	February 2012
South Sinai International Festival The Egyptian Community Party in Saudi Arabia	Riyadh Organized by the General Union of Egyptians Abroad (Saudi Arabia) Sponsored by the Egyptian Ambassador in KSA Afifi Abdel Wahab, and with the appearance of the ambassador Hossam Eisa, the general consul in Riyadh	April 2013
Hala Feb Fair	Kuwait	February 2014
F.I.P.Arts	Tunisia	April 2015
Hala Feb Fair	Kuwait	February 2016
The party of Douz City Included in the activities of Festival De La Joie Africaine in its second version	Tunisia	Mars 2016

	Date of event	Place	The event
12000	September 10, 2011	Cairo International Stadium	The hockey field concert
22000	April 19, 2013	Riyadh	South Sinai International Festival
7000	August 30, 2014	Algeria	Atlais taif concert
7000	Mars 26th 2016	Tunisia	The concert in Douz

El Sawy Culture Wheel concert	Mars 2010
El Sawy Culture Wheel concert	May 2010
Syndicate of Journalists concert	July 2010
Alexandria concert	August 2010
El Sawy Culture Wheel concert	August 2010
Al-Azhar Park concert	September 2010
Tanta concert	October 2010
Mansoura University concert	October 2010
American University concert	October 2010
Assiut University concert	November 2010
UAE concert	November 2010
El Sawy Culture Wheel concert	November 2010
Al Azhar University Darrasah concert	November 2010
A poetic evening in the UAE	November 2010
Mansoura University concert	December 2010
Suez University concert	December 2010
Menofia concert	December 2010
El Sawy Culture Wheel concert	December 2010
Dubai concert	February 2011
Suez concert	April 2011
Tunisia concert	April 2011
Zagazig concert	April 2011
Tanta concert	April 2011
Future University concert	April 2011
Sohag concert	April 2011
El-Mahalla concert	April 2011
The evening event for the friends of the sluice	June 2011
Presidential leadership program in the Convention Centre	October 2011
Concert in the hockey field in Cairo International Stadium	September 2011
An evening in Alexandria in Ramadan	August 2012
Damietta concert	October 2012
An evening in Al Mathaf Hotel	December 2012
An evening in the Islamic University of Gaza	December 2012
Assiut University concert	May 2013
Bibliotheca Alexandrina concert	May 2013
An evening in Palestine	October 2013
Bibliotheca Alexandrina concert	October 2013
Bibliotheca Alexandrina concert	February 2014
American University concert	May 2014
Bibliotheca Alexandrina concert	July 2014
The concert in Atlais taif in Algeria	August 2014
Concert in Ramallah – Palestine	October 2014
Mansoura concert	December 2014
Tanta concert	December 2014
Concert in Nazareth – Israel	February 2015
Bibliotheca Alexandrina concert	Mars 2015
Faiyum concert	May 2015
Qena concert	June 2015
Concert in the stage of Rajac Language School	June 2015
Kafr El-Dawar concert	August 2015
Tanta concert	December 2015
Bibliotheca Alexandrina concert	January 2016
Kafr El Sheikh concert	April 2016
Asyut concert	April 2016

== Television appearances ==
In Ramadan 2010, Algakh had his own segment on Egyptian television, on the show "Yes'ed Sabahak". The segment was called "qoūl ya Hawīs". Every day, he would read his poems with the tunes of the oud playing as his background music. The list of some of his most important television appearances:

Name of show	Name of Channel	The host's	Date of appearance
Shababeek	Dream 1		May 21, 2010
Min Kaleb Maser	Nile Life	Lamis Elhadidy	July 6, 2010
Sabah Elkher Ya Masr	Egyptian TV		July 23, 2010
Al Ashira Masa'an	Dream 2	Mona el-Shazly	July 28, 2010
Baladna Bl Masry	ON TV	Reem Maged	January 20, 2011
48 hours	Mehwar TV		January 23, 2011
Baladna Bl Masry	ON TV	Reem Maged	Mars 6, 2011
Muntaha Al Sahara	Al Hayat 2	Mostafa Bakry	April 28, 2011
360 degrees	Al Hayat	Heba Al-Abasiry	July 4, 2011
Tahya Masr	LTB	Tamer Amin	December 7, 2011
90 minutes	Mehwar TV	Amr Ellissy	February 22, 2012
Sabah ON	ON TV	Youssef El Husseiny	Mars 8, 2012
ʻalá al-maqhá	Aljazeera Mubasher channel Egypt	Dohaalzohairy	Mars 22, 2012
90 Minutes	Mehwar TV	Amr Ellissy	April 24, 2012
Ez El Shabab	Rotana Masriya		May 22, 2012
Akher Kalam	ON TV	Yosri Fouda	September 22, 2012
Mahatet Masr	Misr 25	Moataz Matar	November 26, 2012
Bani Adam Show – season 3	Al Hayat	Ahmed Adam	April 22, 2013
Gomla Mofida	MBC Masr	Mona el-Shazly	May 29, 2013
El 3ashera msa2n	Dream 2	Wael Elebrashy	June 16, 2013
Momken	CBC	Khayri Ramadan	June 20, 2013
Jar Shakel	CBC	Mohammed Ali Kher	July 22, 2013
Abu Za'abl	Dream 1	Mona Abdel Wahab	July 23, 2013
Alhokm Baad Almozawla	Produced by: E-cloud Egypt		November 21, 2013
Al Nahar	Ennahar TV	Khaled Salah	April 14, 2014
Re7t 2lbon	Blue Nile TV	Mahmoud Algaily	July 1, 2014
Liqa'a khas	Ennahar TV	Yasser Lorabi	August 29, 2014
As'ad Allah Masa'akom	MBC Masr	Akram Hosny	September 27, 2014
	24FM		September 27, 2014
Momkn	CBC	Khayri Ramadan	December 25, 2014
Akher El Ousbou	Rotana Masriya	Mohammed Al Okbi	January 31, 2015
	Arab TV	Sayed Hasnain	February 12, 2015
90 minutes	Mehwar TV	Eman Elhossary	Mars 4, 2015
Liqa'a khas	Telvza TV	Habib Trabelsi	April 28, 2015
Makom	CBC	Mona El-Shazly	May 8, 2015
Kholaset El Kalam	Al Hayat		November 25, 2015
Al Setat	CBC		October 4, 2015
Al Mataha	MBC Masr	Wafaa El Kilani	October 28, 2015
Helwa Ya Donya	Roya TV		February 12, 2016
24/7	Alhiwar TV		Mars 22, 2016

- In the show "Re7t 2lbon" which aired on the channel "Blue Nile TV" the poet hosted the show in 2014, where he presented 10 episodes that aired in Ramadan.

== Prizes and honors ==
- F.I.P.Arts in Tunisia.
- Hala Feb Festival - Tuesday Feb 9, 2016.
- Festival De La Joie Africaine in the city of Douz – south Tunisia.
- He was honored in 7 Jamahiriya parties in 7 different Algerian states.
- Best young colloquial poet from the Egyptian writers union in 2008.
- He won second place in the Prince of Poets contest in Abu Dhabi in 2011.
