= MyTV (Arabic) =

Arabic-language TV streaming service

myTV
- Company type: Corporation, start-up
- Industry: Broadcast
- Founded: Beirut, Lebanon (2011)
- Headquarters: myTV_Inc. 3941 S. Bristol suite D282; Santa Ana CA 92704, US myTV SAL; MGM building 5th Floor; Jal El-Dib Main Rd; Postal Code:2620 2501; Metn, Lebanon
- Area served: North America & South America
- Key people: Spiro Azkoul (CEO)
- Products: Direct broadcast satellite, Video on Demand, OTT
- Website: www.my-tv.us

myTV is an Arab American provider of Arabic live channels and video on demand in North and South America, Australia and New Zealand, using over-the-top technology.

== History ==
myTV, an over-the-top content service provider with offices in Lebanon and the U.S., was founded on the June 15, 2011 by Lebanese expatriates living in the US. The concept was originally developed by SNA Corp. a leading provider of Digital Online Content services for multinational media companies. MyTV provides Arabic-language Live TV Channels and Video on Demand (VOD) everywhere in the Americas as well as Europe, Australia and New Zealand.

The myTV service helps expatriates and people-on-the-move feel closer to their homeland, by giving them access to the channels they love, and the TV shows, movies or music videos they miss, straight to their living room television set or mobile device. In response to the demand for quality television in Arabic, myTV secured exclusive deals with the most popular channels such as LBC America and Rotana.

== Launch ==
myTV launched its services through an online campaign themed "Messages from Home" that began on January 30, 2012. The videos, composed of genuine messages gathered from Lebanese people across the country to their relatives abroad, were posted on Facebook, YouTube, Twitter and Pinterest; these social platforms made up the bulk of online tools used during the campaign.

== Recognition ==
In March 2013, Communicate Levant, the Beirut-based sibling of market-leading Communicate magazine, one of the region's leading advertising, marketing and media resource, voted myTV as the number one startup for 2013.

== Features ==
=== Live Channels ===
Channels currently available on myTV include

- LBC America
- LBC America Drama
- LBC America News
- Al Sumaria
- Rotana Khalijiah
- Rotana Masriya
- Al Jadeed
- Fann
- Safwa
- Roya TV
- Arab Woman TV
- Al-Resalah
- Iqraa
- Taha TV
- Iqraa Europe
- Iqraa America
- Iqraa Asia and Australia
- Rotana Cinema
- Cinema 1
- Cinema 2
- Rotana Aflam
- Rotana Classic
- Al Yawm
- Al Mousalsalat
- Rusiya Al-Yawm
- Sky News Arabia
- BBC Arabic
- ONTV
- Rotana Music
- Rotana Clip
- Music Now
- Karameesh

=== Video on Demand ===
myTV has an extensive Video on Demand library, consisting of Arabic movies, Arabic TV series, documentaries, cartoons and short films consisting of popular titles, such as the following:

- A collection of Youssef Chahine films.
- Lebanese classic TV series, such as Insa Hmoumak and El Denieh hek, as well as musical films by Lebanese singer Fairuz.
- Umm Kulthum and Abdel Halim Hafez concerts.
- Several works of the character Ghawwar el Tosheh (Duraid Lahham), such as Shaqaeq Al Noman, Day'et Tishrin, Hamam el Hana and Wein el Ghalat.
- Al Shahroura, the Ramadan TV series that tells the story of Lebanese singer Sabah and explores her artistic and personal life. A biography acted out by pop star Carole Samaha
- As the Poet Said, a film that takes on a poetic approach to the life of the late Palestinian poet Mahmoud Darwish.
- Several historical series, telling the tales of Antarah ibn Shaddad and Khalid ibn al-Walid.
- Foreign Arabic-dubbed series, such as María la del Barrio, starring Thalía and Rosalinda
- A long list of anime cartoons dubbed (Arabic voice over) in Arabic, including Grendizer, Sally Captain Majid and Calimero
- A series of the interpretation of the Quran by Sheikh Sha'arawi
- A series of high-profile interviews with celebrities all over the world by renowned Lebanese host Ricardo Karam

== Device support ==
As of 2013, myTV has become available on over 300 devices, which consist of set-top boxes, smart TVs and tablets.

Some of the devices include:

- Google TV devices Set-top boxes like Sony Internet Player TV as well as Android and Samsung tablets.
- Boxee Box set-top box
- Samsung Smart TV
- LG SMART TV (only 47G2 and 55G2 Models)
- WD TV Live
- Netgear Neo TV 300

== See also ==
- Internet Television
