= Wafaa El Kilani =

Egyptian television presenter

- Born: Wafaa Hamed El Kilani; September 10, 1972 (age 53); Cairo, Egypt
- Occupation: Presenter
- Years active: 1997–present
- Spouses: Tony Michael (m. 2008; div. 2016) Taim Hasan (m. 2017)
- Children: 2

Wafaa El Kilani (born 10 September 1972 in Cairo) is an Egyptian presenter. She has presented many TV interview shows for various Arabic media channels, becoming one of the most popular Arab presenters.

== Early life and career ==
El Kilani was born in Cairo. Her father is a businessman and she has lived in multiple Arab countries. She studied political science at Benghazi University in Libya. She began working with Arab Radio and Television Network in 1997 and moved to Rotana in 2005. She became well known after her work for Without censorship in 2009 on LBC. In 2012, she moved to MBC 1. She has interviewed many Arab celebrities in her shows, such as Adel Emam and Kazem al Saher.

== Personal life ==
In August 2008, she civily married Lebanese journalist Tony Michael in Cyprus, despite her family's opposition because of their different religions. They have two children and divorced in 2016. In May 2017 she married Syrian actor Taim Hasan.

== Shows ==
Year	Name	Channels
1997	Celebrities news	Arab Radio and Television Network
1998	Studio live	Arab Radio and Television Network
1998	Afesh	Arab Radio and Television Network
1999	Claket	Arab Radio and Television Network
2000	Telephone in one Million	Arab Radio and Television Network
2001	Skermo	Arab Radio and Television Network
2001	Desert rain festival	Arab Radio and Television Network
2002	Test your luck	Arab Radio and Television Network
2003	Special episodes with Adel Emam	Arab Radio and Television Network
2004	Talou Habaybna	Arab Radio and Television Network
2005	Ghaneli	Rotana Tarab
2006	Feha eh	Rotana Mousica
2007	Box of life	Rotana Mousica
2007	Against wave	Rotana Mousica
2008	Thouq makayl	Rotana Mousica
2009–2010	Without censorship	LBCI
2012	Nawaret	MBC 1
2013	Little talk	MBC 1
2014	The Judgement	MBC 1
2015	The Maze	MBC 1
2018	Takharef	MBC 1
2020	The biography	MBC 1

== Awards ==
Year	Award
2012	Most popular presenter from Ana Zahra magazine.
2014	Best Arab presenter from Dear guest magazine.
2014	Best presenter from Elaph magazine.
2018	Best presenter according to Veto poll.
