= Taim Hasan =

Syrian actor (born 1976)

- تيم حسن
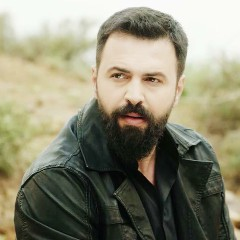
- Born: February 17, 1976 (age 50); Tartus, Syria
- Occupation: Actor
- Height: 182 cm (6 ft 0 in)
- Spouses: Dima Bayaa (m. 2002; div. 2012) Wafaa El Kilani (m. 2017)
- Children: 2

Taim Hasan (Arabic: تيم حسن; born February 17, 1976) is a prominent Syrian actor, known for his dramatic roles in Syria and the Arab world. Hasan achieved fame in Syria through a number of Syrian series, most notably Saladin, Taifas and Nizar Qabbani. The title role in the series King Farouk established him as one of the leading stars in the Arab world. He appeared with Hatem Ali, one of Syria's leading directors, in a majority of his series such as The Philanderer Salem. He has also starred in The Waiting (2006).

== Life and career ==
Taim Hasan, originally from Al-Shaykh Badr, was born on February 17, 1976, in Tartus, Syria's second-largest port city. By the age of 4 or 5, he moved with his family to Damascus. He comes from a middle-class Syrian family that had no prior connection with the film business. His father, who finished his education in Germany, is a German language teacher whereas his mother is an Arabic language teacher. On July 1, 2004, he married the Syrian actress Dima Bayaa and they have two children named Ward and Fahad.

He has confirmed that when he first applied to the Higher Institute of Dramatic Arts, he was rejected. However, when he applied for the second time in front of a committee headed by the Syrian actor Jamal Suliman, he was accepted.

Since his graduation from the High Institute for Dramatic Arts in 2001, Hassan has been able to establish himself by taking influential roles in some of the most renowned Syrian television series. His first remembered role came in the year 2000 (while still completing his degree at the High Institute for Dramatic Arts) in the Syrian series The Philanderer Salem directed by Syrian director Hatem Ali. In the following year, Hassan took on his role in the series Saladin, also directed by Hatem Ali, in which Hassan played the role of the Fatimid Caliph Al-Aded Ledin Allah.

Upon completing his role in the series Along Days, a romantic drama in which he played the leading role, Hassan took on the title role of King Farouk, a major project in Egypt. Though this was not the first time that Hassan played a major historic figure, as he played the role of Syria's most famous poet, Nizar Qabbani, in the series Nizar Qabbani in 2005.

On December 6, 2007, Hassan received the Gold Medal in the Best Actor's Award category shared with Egyptian actor Yehia El-Fakharany at the Cairo Festival for Arab Media for playing the title role in the 2007 Ramadan Egyptian hit television series King Farouk.

Hasan's last television series, which was filmed in Morocco and Syria titled Conflict on the Sand—a title that was changed from Days of Revenge—was released for worldwide broadcast in Ramadan of 2008 and was seen by many commentators as a revival of Beduin series in Arabic drama. The television series, a Beduin epic that takes place in the Gulf Beduin desert at the beginning of the 18th century, also starred Jordanian actress Saba Mubarak and Syrian actors Muna Wassef, Abdel Moneim Al Ameri, Hasan Awaytti and Bassel Khaiat and is directed by Hatem Ali and written by Hany al-Saady. The series was produced by Dubai Media Incorporated in collaboration with Picture for Media Productions, a Syrian production company owned by renowned Syrian director Hatem Ali. Its estimated cost was over $6 million and it was based on the vision and poetry of Sheikh Mohammed bin Rashid Al Maktoum.

Hasan played a leading role in Mecano, 2009. The movie also starred Lebanese actress, Nour, and Egyptian actor, Khaled El Sawi. This psycho-drama tells the story of a young architect, who is suffering from a rare disease that affects his short-term memory and who falls in love with Amira (played by Nour) who helps him overcome his ordeal.

Taim is the lead character of all five seasons of the hit Lebanese series Al Hayba which features many Arab celebrities such as Muna Wassef, Rouzaina Lazkani, Cyrine Abdelnour, Valerie Abou Chacra, Nadine Nassib Njeim, Nicole Saba, Dima Kandalaft, Aimée Sayah, and Mohammad Wasef.

== Personal life ==
Taim Hasan and his ex-wife, Syrian actress Dima Bayaa, announced their divorce after 10 years of marriage. In 2017, he married Egyptian TV presenter, Wafaa El Kilani.
