= Battle of Mansurah =

Battle of Mansurah may refer to:

- Battle of Mansurah (1221), during the Fifth Crusade
- Battle of Mansurah (1250), during the Seventh Crusade
- Air battle of Mansoura (1973), during the Yom Kippur War
