= Reem Maged =

Egyptian journalist (born 1974)

Reem Maged ريم ماجد
- Born: 1 January 1974 (age 52)
- Occupations: Journalist and host on ONTV; Host

Reem Maged (Arabic: ريم ماجد فوزى السيد أبو زيد [ˈriːm ˈmaːɡid]; born 1 January 1974) is an Egyptian journalist and former host of the popular Baladna bel Masry talk show on Egyptian ONTV. Maged's popularity and renown have dramatically increased due to her critical coverage of political events since the 2011 Egyptian revolution, as well as her hosting of individuals on her show that are critical of the military Supreme Council of the Armed Forces, or SCAF, that has ruled Egypt since the resignation of Hosni Mubarak. She has been described as "Egypt’s best and arguably most vocal [female voice] in delivering the true happenings to the country on a nightly basis." Maged stopped presenting the show in 2013 and in 2014 joined a hunger strike campaign in solidarity with political prisoners.

== Education and early career ==
Maged studied media at Cairo University and graduated in 1995. After graduating, Maged began working at Nile TV where she was employed for 12 years. Maged also produced films for the Al Jazeera Children's Channel. She later traveled extensively while working for Dubai-based Hot Spot productions, producing a series of documentaries. She currently works for ONTV.

== Egyptian Revolution and Post-Revolution Political Coverage ==
Maged gained renown during the initial days of the 2011 Egyptian revolution, in which she would spend her days at protest locations and then report the stories she had been told by protesters during the nightly newscasts. After the revolution, her talk show emerged as a crucial space for the airing of critical opinions regarding pressing political and social issues in Egypt. Maged's hosting of individuals critical of the Egyptian military and its handling of the post-revolution period led her to be summoned for questioning by military authorities, and at one point pro-SCAF demonstrators displayed banners at a protest that called for her execution, along with fellow Egyptian television hosts Mona el-Shazly, Lamis Elhadidy and Amr Adib.

=== Baladna bel Masry ===
Maged hosted the talk show Baladna bel Masry on Egyptian satellite channel ONTV on which she and her guests frequently tackled controversial political issues. Egyptian media have largely struggled to adapt to the post-revolution atmosphere, in which red lines for coverage initially appeared to have been erased. It quickly became clear, however, that SCAF was re-organizing state media and moving to quash criticism of the military in private media. It is within this atmosphere of uncertainty regarding the acceptable limits of political coverage that Baladna bel Masry emerged as one of "the most respected and nuanced programs in Egypt in the post-revolution atmosphere". Maged's critical coverage of Egyptian politics and the SCAF led to the resignation of Prime Minister Ahmed Shafik, as well as her summoning for questioning by military authorities following comments made by journalist and blogger Hossam el-Hamalawy on her program.

=== Role in resignation of Prime Minister Ahmed Shafik ===
On 2 March 2011, Maged hosted then-Prime Minister Ahmed Shafik, who had been appointed by ousted president Hosni Mubarak, and Egyptian novelist Alaa Al Aswany, author of The Yacoubian Building, as well as veteran journalist Hamdy Kandeel. Al Aswany was highly critical of Shafik during the broadcast. Shafik attempted to defend his previously publicized plan to turn Tahrir Square into an Egyptian version of London's Hyde Park, where protesters could gather to make speeches. Al Aswany responded, accusing him of "ignoring the more than 300 people who died in the protests and wanting to give out 'sweets and chocolate'". The Wall Street Journal wrote that Shafik retorted, "'wanting the people to stay in a clean place is wrong?' ... 'We should find out who killed them first,' answered Aswany". Al Aswany furthermore accused Shafik of being a holdover of the regime that Egyptians had struggled to topple, and that he was unfit to represent Egyptians in the post-revolution era.

The episode led to Shafik's announcement of his resignation as Egyptian Prime Minister the next day. His poor performance and the vocal reaction to his responses, as well as the response to Al Aswany's fierce questioning of him, allegedly "helped push Egypt's military rulers into acceding to protester demands and pushing out Mr. Shafik". Importantly, the episode of Maged's program was argued to be "the first real political debate between a prime minister and opposition figures in Egypt", as interviews of government figures under the Mubarak regime generally involved sets of prepared questions and would never be so contentious. The interview has been called "the episode that toppled an Egyptian cabinet". The Los Angeles Times dubbed the interview "the TV talk show that played the biggest part in speeding up his imminent resignation".

Maged said that she does not attribute Shafik's resignation solely to her show, stating that "I don’t think the show inspired his decision to resign, it simply sped it up. I believe there was already an idea to do just that. The show was the straw that broke the camel’s back."

=== Summoning for Questioning by Military Authorities ===
Maged and Egyptian journalist and activist Hossam el-Hamalawy were interrogated by military authorities in May 2011, following Maged's hosting of el-Hamalawy on Baladna bel Masry. El-Hamalawy alleged in the broadcast that military police had tortured activists and that the head of the military police should be held responsible. El-Hamalawy wrote on his blog that he initially met with a military prosecutor as an "accused" and that Maged was a "witness", but that shortly after the questioning began the military claimed that they were only present for a "coffee and chat," and that el-Hamalawy had been invited to hand over any information he had regarding abuses in military prisons. El-Hamalawy maintained that his accusations were based on evidence documented by international human rights organizations and local Egyptian activists, and that the same evidence remains publicly available.

=== Interview with Hazem Salah Abu Ismail ===
In November 2011, Maged conducted an interview with salafi Egyptian presidential candidate Hazem Salah Abu Ismail in which he urged her to wear the veil, telling her, "I like for you what I like for my sister, and I admire your courage during the January revolution and I wish the next time we meet, things will be different." A salafi news outlet later re-aired the interview, covering Maged's hair and face with a dark filter during the broadcast.

== Cessation of broadcasting in 2013 ==
Maged stopped presenting her talk show in 2013. In an interview with Al-Shorouk, she said that ONTV's priorities were national security and unity while her priority was freedom. In September 2014, she went on a 48-hour hunger strike as part of a campaign of solidarity with political prisoners who were also on hunger-strikes.

== See also ==
- Lists of Egyptians
- ONTV (Egypt)
- Yosri Fouda
