= Ahmed Shafik =

Prime Minister of Egypt from January 2011 to March 2011

Air Marshal Ahmed Shafik
- أحمد شفيق
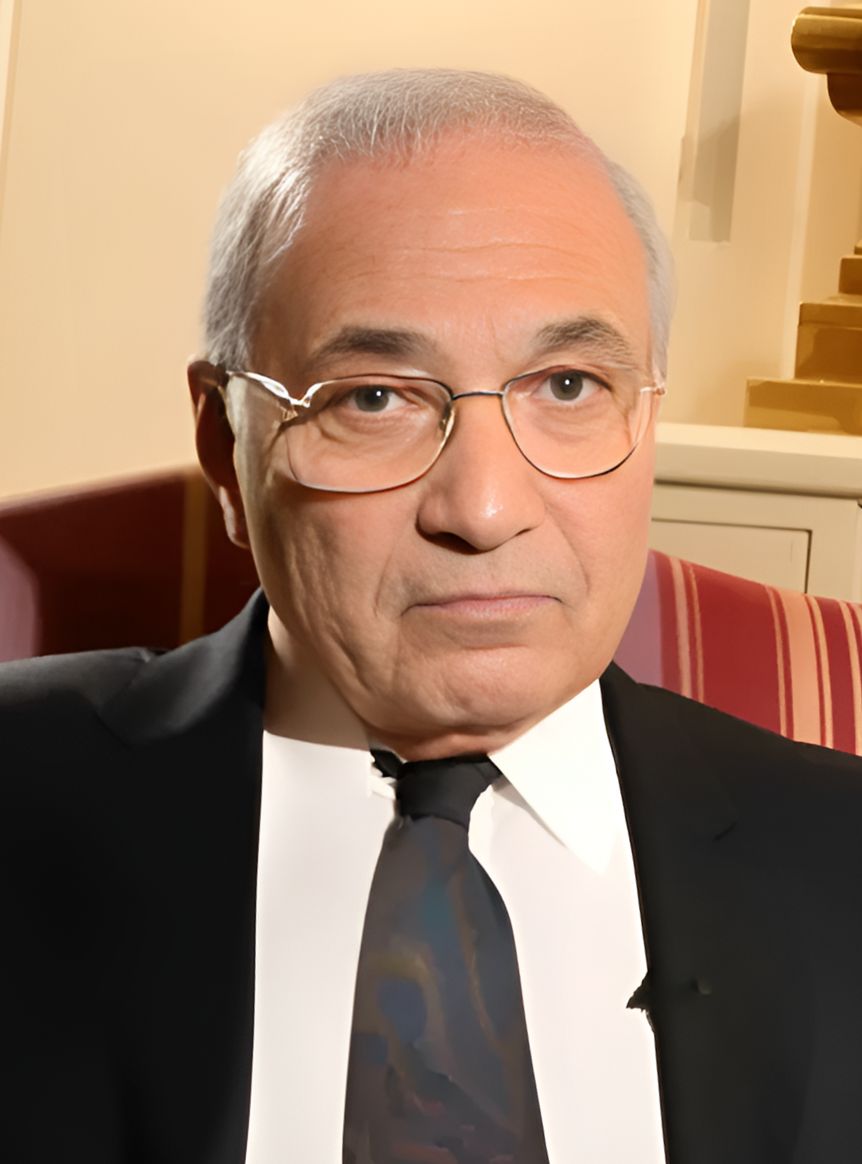
- Shafik in 2012

Prime Minister of Egypt
- In office 29 January 2011 – 3 March 2011
- President: Hosni Mubarak; Mohamed Hussein Tantawi (Acting)
- Preceded by: Ahmed Nazif
- Succeeded by: Essam Sharaf

Minister of Civil Aviation
- In office 18 September 2002 – 28 January 2011
- Prime Minister: Atef Ebeid; Ahmed Nazif
- Preceded by: Ahmed Abdel Rahman Nasser
- Succeeded by: Ibrahim Manaa

Commander of the Air Force
- In office 7 April 1996 – 1 March 2002
- President: Hosni Mubarak
- Preceded by: Ahmed Abdel Rahman Nasser
- Succeeded by: Magdy Galal Sharawi

Personal details
- Born: Ahmed Mohamed Shafik Zaki; 25 November 1941 (age 84) Cairo, Kingdom of Egypt
- Party: Egyptian National Movement (December 2012 – present)
- Spouse: Azza Tawfiq
- Children: 3
- Awards: Medal of Military Duty

Military service
- Allegiance: Egypt
- Branch/service: Egyptian Air Force
- Years of service: 1961–2002
- Rank: Air Marshal
- Battles/wars: North Yemen Civil War; Six-Day War; War of Attrition; October War; 1986 Egyptian conscripts riot

Air Marshal Ahmed Mohamed Shafik Zaki (Note: Also spelled: Shafiq.) (Arabic: أحمد محمد شفيق زكي, IPA: [ˈæħmæd mæˈħæmmæd ʃæˈfiːʔ ˈzæki]; born 25 November 1941) is an Egyptian politician and former presidential candidate. He served as commander in the Egyptian Air Force and later served as Prime Minister of Egypt from 29 January 2011 to 3 March 2011 under Hosni Mubarak.

After a career as a fighter pilot, and squadron, wing and group commander, Shafik was the Commander of the Egyptian Air Force from 1996 to 2002, reaching the rank of air marshal. Thereafter he served in the government as Minister of Civil Aviation from 2002 to 2011.

He was appointed as prime minister by President Hosni Mubarak on 29 January 2011 in response to the 2011 Egyptian Revolution, making him the last prime minister to serve as part of Mubarak's administration. He remained in office for only one month, resigning on 3 March 2011, one day after a contentious talk show confrontation in which Alaa Al Aswany, a prominent Egyptian novelist, accused him of being a Mubarak regime holdover.

He narrowly lost out in the 2012 Egyptian presidential elections to Mohamed Morsi, the candidate of the Freedom and Justice Party, gaining 48.27% of the vote, compared to Morsi's 51.73%.

== Early life and education ==
Shafik was born in the Heliopolis district of Cairo on 25 November 1941. His parents were prominent members of Egyptian society, with his father, Mohamed Shafiq Zaki, serving as undersecretary at the ministry of irrigation and his mother, Naja Alwi, being the daughter of a noted ophthalmologist. After completing his schooling at the Heliopolis Secondary School, he attended the Egyptian Air Academy from where he graduated in 1962 at the age of 21 and became a member of the Egyptian Air Force (EAF). Later in his career, he gained a master's degree in military science; a Fellowship of High War College from Nasser Military Academy; a Fellowship of Combined Arms from the High War College in Paris; a Fellowship of the National Defense College from Nasser Military Academy; and a PhD in "The National Strategy of Outer-Space". Air Marshal Ahmed Shafik received the highest medals and merits during his service.

== Military career ==
As a young officer, Shafik served as a Mig-19 and Mig-21 fighter pilot and was later appointed as fighter air squadron commander. During the War of Attrition (1967–1970), Shafik saw active service as the Multi-Task Airwing Commander. Subsequently, he took up a post as an air base commander.

During the 1973 October War, Shafik was a senior fighter pilot under Hosni Mubarak's command. Shafik shot down two Israeli aircraft during the war on 14 October 1973.

During his 40 years of service in the Egyptian Air Force as a fighter pilot, he flew several types of fighter jets including the Mikoyan-Gurevich MiG-17, Mikoyan-Gurevich MiG-19, Mikoyan-Gurevich MiG-21 and the Dassault Mirage 2000; he also acted as the wing commander for the Egyptian Air Force acrobatic team. He is also fully qualified on the American-built McDonnell Douglas F-4 Phantom II and the General Dynamics F-16 Fighting Falcon.

In 1984, Shafik was appointed military attaché in the Egyptian Embassy in Rome. He continued in this role until 1986. In 1986, he was promoted to Air Commodore and became commander of a Group and Mig-21 Airbase. During the CSF conscription riot of 1986, President Mubarak wanted the Armed Forces to crush the revolt. He relied on the Air Force to intimidate and bomb some CSF rebels in Cairo and Upper Egypt. The commander who was tasked with the actual execution of the operation was Brigadier/Air Commodore Ahmed Shafik, as Deputy Chief of Operations (Fighter-Bomber) for the Central Air Region. From 1988 to 1991, Shafik served several military senior command positions before he was appointed as the Commander of the Air Operations Department.

In September 1991, Shafik was appointed as the Air Force's chief of staff, holding this position until April 1996, when he became Commander of the Egyptian Air Force. In 2002 he resigned from military service and was succeeded by his chief of staff, Air Marshal Magdy Galal Sharawi.

== Political career ==
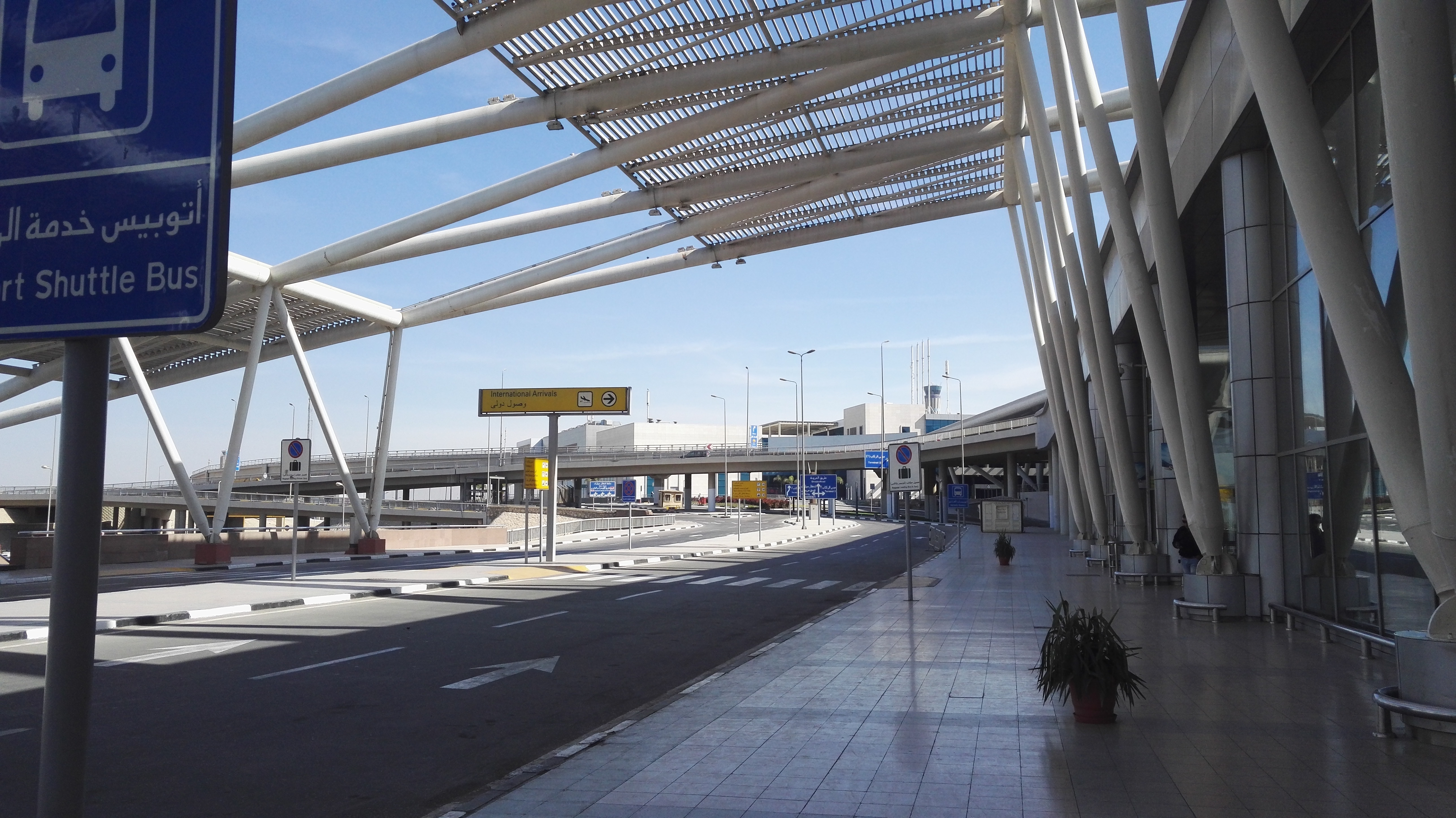
Shafik helped construct Cairo International Airport's 3rd terminal.

After retiring from the Air Force, Shafik became the Minister of Civil Aviation on 18 September 2002, not long after the Ministry's formation. Whilst he was the minister for civil aviation, he oversaw improvements in EgyptAir and helped construct a new third terminal at Cairo International Airport which was completed in 2008 and opened for commercial operations on 27 April 2009. He continued the position until succeeding Ahmed Nazif as the prime minister of Egypt on 29 January 2011.

During the course of the Egyptian Revolution of 2011, Shafik was named prime minister by then president Hosni Mubarak on 29 January 2011. Shafik's period in office as prime minister was short-lived, lasting just over a month, after he resigned on 3 March due to pressure from protestors and the opposition. They had objected to Shafik staying on as PM, having been seen as one of Mubarak's old guard. Shafik was alleged to have been a member of the Supreme Council of the Armed Forces that took over power after Mubarak's departure on 11 February 2011, although initial reporting only reflected a poor understanding of the makeup of the SCAF immediately following Mubarak's fall. Shafik was succeeded by Essam Sharaf after he stepped down.

Shafik resigned from office one day after a contentious interview on the Egyptian ONTV satellite network in which he was confronted by Alaa Al Aswany, author of The Yacoubian Building, on Reem Maged's talk show Baladna bel Masry. Al Aswany was highly critical of Shafik during the broadcast, representing one of the first televised public criticisms of a high-ranking government official in Egyptian history. At one point, Al Aswany said about Shafik, "if your son had been one of those who got run over by the police cars, you would not have remained silent like that." Al Aswany furthermore accused Shafik of being a holdover of the regime that Egyptians had struggled to topple, and that he was unfit to represent Egyptians in the post-revolution era.

On 10 July, Shafik made his first public appearance since resigning as prime minister. He attended the graduation ceremony of the Egyptian Air Force Academy class along with the Chief of Staff of the Egyptian Armed Forces.

=== 2012 Egyptian presidential election ===
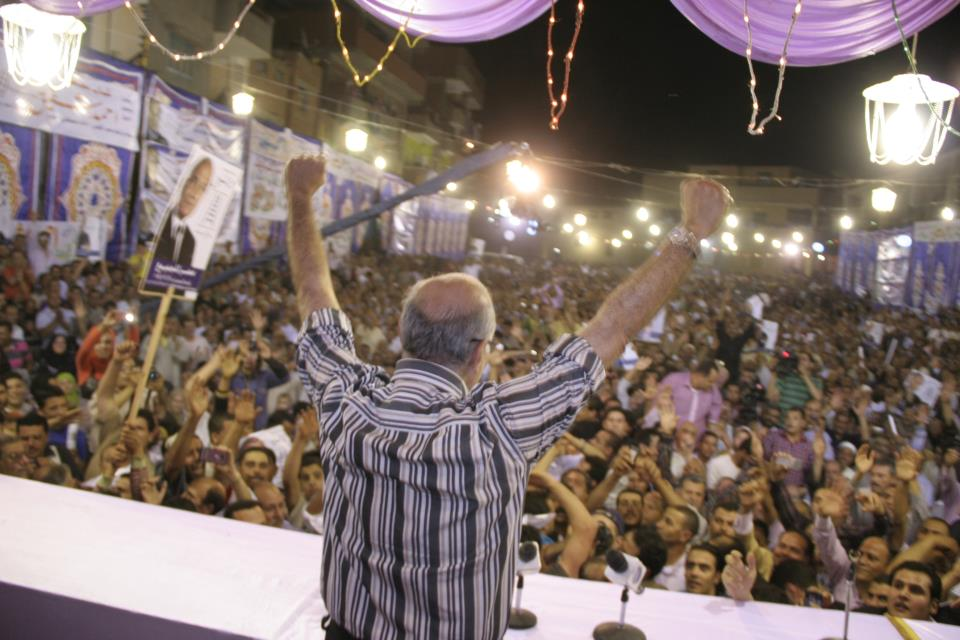
Shafik during a campaign rally

In November 2011, Shafik announced his candidacy in the Egyptian presidential election. Shafik's candidacy sparked controversy and protest within Egypt, with many considering him to be a holdover of the Mubarak regime. Shafik's remark that he considers former president Hosni Mubarak to be a "role model" was particularly controversial. At one campaign event, a protester hurled shoes at him, although Shafik was not struck. Shafik's candidacy was noted as supported by many in Egypt's Coptic Christian minority who are opposed to Islamist candidates in the election.

Along with the Muslim Brotherhood's Freedom and Justice Party candidate Mohamed Morsi, Shafik was one of two candidates who survived the first round of voting on 23–24 May, coming in behind Morsi. The second and final round of voting was held on 16–17 June 2012. Allegations have arisen that the interior ministry handed out over 900,000 ID cards to Egyptian soldiers so that they could vote for Shafik, which would be a major campaign violation. Fellow presidential candidate Hamdeen Sabahi, who finished in third place in the first round of voting, asked for the Egyptian election to be temporarily suspended until an investigation could be carried out.

On 28 May 2012, protesters angry at Shafik's advancement to the second round of voting set fire to an office associated with his campaign in Cairo. Fellow candidate Khaled Ali said while participating in a protest against the election results in Tahrir Square that Tahrir had "toppled Mubarak, and would topple Shafik". The election contest between Shafik and Morsi had been described as a "choice between two of Egypt's most polarizing politicians", and some activists resorted to participation in a hunger strike to protest his candidacy.

Shafik's presidential campaign was characterized by an emphasis on public order and security, and although the ruling Supreme Council of the Armed Forces did not endorse a candidate, American news outlet McClatchy Newspapers pointed to the "conspicuous presence of sympathetic security forces at his campaign stops" as evidence of his close relationship with the military. Shafik used his campaign events to court Egyptian elites and voters wary of an Islamist-led government. He reportedly suggested that he would employ executions and "brutal force" to restore order in the country within a month of taking office.

Although preliminary election results indicated that the Muslim Brotherhood's candidate Mohamed Morsi won the second round of elections by a slight margin, the results remained within the margin of error and the Supreme Council of the Armed Forces, with Shafik claiming victory in the election.

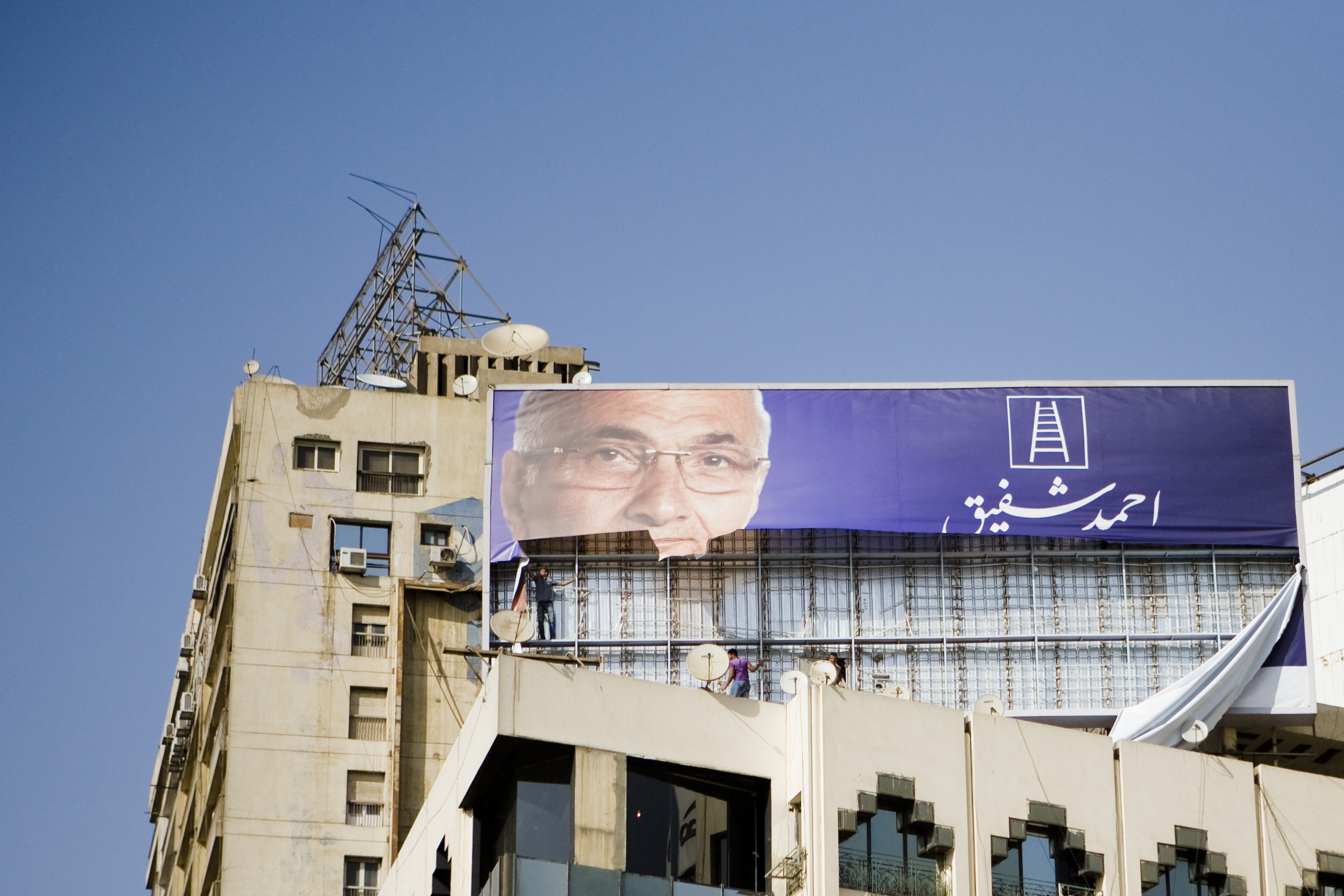
Protesters tearing a campaign billboard of Shafik after the election results were announced.

On 24 June, the High Presidential Electoral Commission, headed by Farouk Sultan, announced Shafik's narrow defeat by his bitter rival Morsi, with 48.27% of the vote for the former, compared to Morsi's 51.73%.

In the hours following his defeat, it was widely reported that Shafik and his family flew out to Abu Dhabi, wary of potential charges of financial irregularities and electoral fraud, a move he later confirmed on Sky News.

Shafik alleged that the election was flawed; Public Prosecutor Abdel Meguid Mahmoud called for an investigation into the claims. In August 2013, former Israeli negotiator Yossi Beilin stated that an Egyptian official had told him that the true results of the election were in favor of Shafik, but the military gave the presidency to Morsi out of fear of unrest.

=== Launch of new political party ===
Shafik announced that he would launch a new political party, called the Egyptian National Movement, on 24 September 2012.

=== 2018 Egyptian presidential election ===
On 29 November 2017, Ahmed Shafik announced his intention to run in the Egyptian presidential election, but a few hours later announced that the United Arab Emirates prevented him from leaving its territory after announcing his intention to run in the presidential election which was denied by the Minister of State for Foreign Affairs Anwar Gargash and said in a series of tweets on Twitter, that there was "no obstacle" for Shafik to leave the UAE, and that the UAE was "sad" to learn that Mr. Shafik was ungrateful. "We facilitated matters for him and we have generously welcomed him, despite our strong reservations about some of his stances," Gargash wrote. On 2 December 2017, Shafik was deported from the UAE to France. The next day he left France and arrived in Egypt.

On 7 January 2018, Shafik withdrew his candidacy. The New York Times published an article in which it confirmed that Shafik's withdrawal was based on threats made by the Egyptian government with old corruption charges and an alleged sex tape. The New York Times confirmed having audio recordings from an officer in one of the Egyptian security services, Ashraf al-Kholi, instructing a number of media professionals to put pressure on public opinion on the former candidate and head of the air force in order to force him to withdraw from the presidential race.

These audio leaks, broadcast simultaneously by Al Jazeera Arabic and the opposition channel Mekameleen on its program "Egypt Today" with journalist Mohamed Nasser on Monday, January 8, 2018, featuring Mofeed Fawzy, Saeed Hassasein, Azmi Megahed, and others, corroborated the New York Times' claims and fueled a wave of anger against a number of artists and media figures on social media.

== Notes ==
Military offices
Preceded by Ahmed Abdel Rahman Nasser	Commander of the Egyptian Air Force; 1996–2002	Succeeded by Magdy Galal Sharawi
Political offices
Preceded by Ahmed Abdel Rahman Nasser	Minister of Civil Aviation; 2002–2011	Succeeded by Ibrahim Manaa
Preceded by Ahmed Nazif	Prime Minister of Egypt; 2011	Succeeded by Essam Sharaf
