= Nick Fielding =

British investigative journalist

Nick Fielding is a British investigative journalist.

== Journalism ==
Nick Fielding is a former senior reporter on the Sunday Times and was chief investigative reporter on the Mail on Sunday. At the MoS he broke the story of the renegade MI5 officer David Shayler, and for the Sunday Times he covered the story of Richard Tomlinson, an MI6 whistleblower (Fielding is the author of the introduction to Tomlinson's book The Big Breach).

Fielding exposed the use of child labour in Bangladesh by Levis and in India by C&A. Tory minister Michael Mates was forced to resign after Fielding revealed he had given fugitive financier Asil Nadir an inscribed watch. At the Sunday Times he played a significant role in the recovery of a stolen Enigma coding machine from Bletchley Park. Together with al-Jazeera journalist Yosri Fouda he reported the only interviews ever freely given by the main organisers of the 9/11 attacks on America – Ramzi bin al-Shibh and Khalid Sheikh Mohammed.

He now works as a reporter for the investigative news website Exaro. He recently uncovered a cache of long-hidden documents which revealed the extent of the child sexual abuse that took place at Knowl View school - the school founded by the disgraced paedophile MP Cyril Smith.

He was launch editor for the online magazine, China Outlook, and he writes the Circling the Lions Den blog about Afghanistan.

== Books ==
In October 1999 Nick Fielding's book Defending the Realm: MI5 and the Shayler Affair (together with Mark Hollingsworth) was published by Andre Deutsch Ltd.

In May 2003 Fielding's book Masterminds of Terror: The Truth Behind the Most Devastating Terrorist Attack the World Has Ever Seen (together with Yosri Fouda) was published by Arcade Publishing.
