= Al Sumaria =

Iraqi television channel

- Country: Iraq
- Broadcast area: Worldwide, via satellite and internet
- Headquarters: Baghdad, Iraq

Programming
- Language: Arabic
- Picture format: 1080i HDTV; 576i SDTV

Ownership
- Key people: Ghazwan Jassem (General manager)

History
- Launched: 2004; 22 years ago

Links
- Website: https://www.alsumaria.tv/

Availability

Streaming media
- Live stream: https://www.alsumaria.tv/Live/video

Al Sumaria (Arabic: السومرية) is an independent Iraqi satellite TV network that launched in 2004, it broadcast on Eutelsat 7 West A, and Hellas Sat 3.

Established by a group of businessmen in 2004, it has 700 employees across Iraq, Lebanon, the United Arab Emirates, and Jordan.

Al Sumaria serves a liberal perspective whilst maintaining religious faith and strongly refuting repression and autocracy. Al Sumaria produces almost all of its 24/7 programs in-house. It broadcasts live entertainment, social, political, and game shows hosted by Iraqi presenter, and drama and comedy series starred, directed, and produced by Iraqi companies.

Al Sumaria is acqruied rights to aired some various movies, documentaries, musicals, children, entertainment, sports, and news programs.

== Where it is broadcast ==
Terrestrial broadcasting 64 UHF

Nilesat 102
Frequency: 12130 MHz
Polarization: Vertical
Symbol rate: 27.5 Mb/s
FEC: 5/6

Hot Bird 8 – 13° East
Transponder: 77
Frequency: 12245 MHz
Polarization: Horizontal
Symbol Rate: 27.500 M Symbol
FEC: 3/4

== Availability ==
It is made available for a primarily-Arab audience throughout the world via satellite, online streaming through its website and in the Americas on myTV.
