= Baladna bel Masry =

- بلدنا بالمصري
- Genre: talk show
- Starring: Reem Maged
- Country of origin: Egypt
- Original language: Arabic

Production
- Producer: Omar Shoeb

Original release
- Network: ONTV (Egypt)
- Release: present

Hosted by Egyptian journalist Reem Maged, Baladna bel Masry (Arabic: بلدنا بالمصري [baladnaː bilmasˀriː]) is a daily Egyptian talk show broadcast by Egyptian satellite television network ONTV. The show airs Sunday-Thursday at 8:30pm. The ONTV network bills the show as reflecting "all the cultural & entertainment affairs that occur in Egypt," while at the same time offering in-depth analysis on events that accurately represents public views on current affairs.

== Political Coverage ==
The show has notably tackled a number of politically sensitive issues in Egypt since the 2011 Egyptian revolution. Maged herself was summoned for questioning by military authorities following journalist and blogger Hossam el-Hamalawy's revelation of torture in military prisons on the program. Furthermore, former Prime Minister Ahmed Shafik resigned one day after a contentious interview on the show in which he was confronted by Egyptian author Alaa al-Aswany, leading many to remark that the talk show had led to Shafik's downfall. Such instances of critical political coverage have led the show to be described as one of "the most respected and nuanced programs in Egypt in the post-revolution atmosphere." According to a report issued by the Arabic Network for Human Rights Information and the Egyptian Organization for Human Rights, Baladna bel Masry has been more critical than its competitors in its coverage of the Egyptian judicial system and the Supreme Council of the Armed Forces (SCAF) since the ousting of former president Hosni Mubarak.

== See also ==
- ONTV (Egypt)
- Yosri Fouda
- Reem Maged
