= ART International =

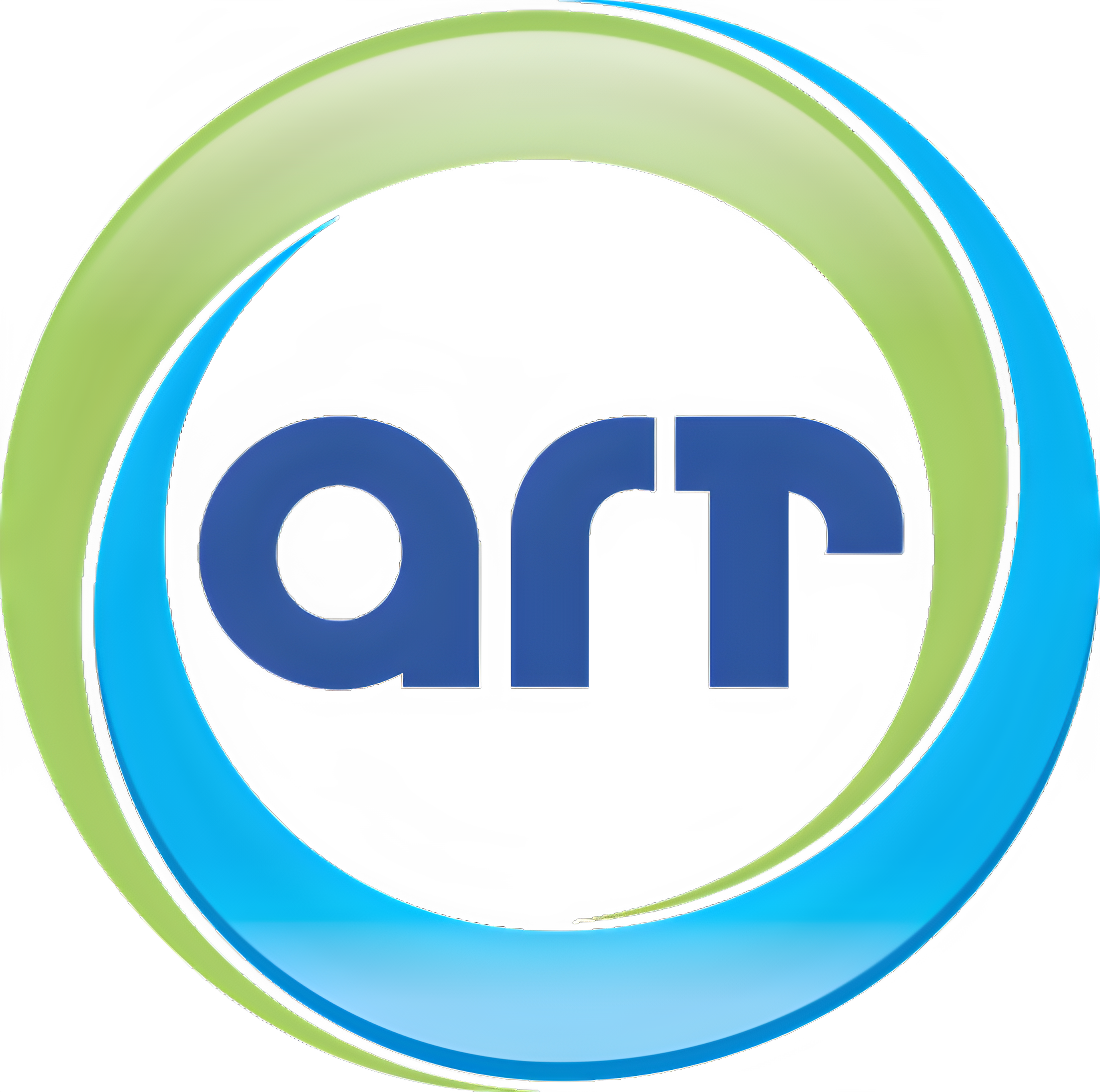
- Country: Saudi Arabia and Egypt
- Broadcast area: Worldwide

Programming
- Language: Arabic
- Picture format: SDTV (576i)

Ownership
- Owner: Arab Radio and Television Network

History
- Launched: 1996; 30 years ago (ART America); 1997; 29 years ago (ART Variety); 2011; 15 years ago (ART Cable)
- Closed: 1 October 2021; 4 years ago (ART America and ART Variety)

Links
- Website: Official website

Availability

Streaming media
- MySatGo: Watch live (only in Australia, Brazil and Canada)
- Sling TV: Internet Protocol television

ART is an international Arabic general entertainment satellite TV channel, part of the Arab Radio and Television Network. ART is available in the United States, Canada, Caribbean (Canada and Caribbean are available on selection pay-TV provider only), Latin America, Australia, New Zealand, Malaysia, and Brunei.

In America, ART America is mix of the best of ART channels, Arab world TV stations programmes and in-house production programmes like Min Beirut, Good Mood, etc. (until 2021). All programmes and ART America's original programmes were available on ART Variety and ART Cable, by the following schedule through time zones.

== Original programming ==
- The Bridge
- Good Mood
- Min Beirut
- New York Doctors
- O² (Oxygen)
- Top 10

== Operating channels ==
- ART Movies (ART Movies America): Arabic movie channel (Time zones: American Eastern (EST), Sydney (SYD) and Greenwich Mean Time (GMT), Formerly: Kuala Lumpur Time (KLU))
- ART Tarab

=== Formerly operating channels ===
- ART
- ART Africa
- ART America
- ART Asia
- ART Latino
- ART Europe
- ART Teenz Europe
- ART Variety (Formerly known as ART Australia, then it was merged into one)

== See also ==
- Arab Radio and Television Network
- https://www.artonline.tv/
