= Yasser Thabet =

Egyptian journalist and author

- Born: 7 May 1964 (age 62); Cologne, Germany
- Occupation: Journalist
- Website: yasser-best.blogspot.com

Yasser Talaat Hafez Thabet (Arabic: ياسر ثابت) is an Egyptian journalist and liberal writer.

== Biography ==
Born on 7 May 1964 in Cologne, Germany, Thabet gained a BA in Journalism from the Mass Communication Faculty at Cairo University, Egypt in May 1985 and a master's degree in Journalism from the Centre for Journalism Studies, University of Wales, Cardiff in 1998. In September 2000, he gained his PhD degree in Journalism from Barrington University in Alabama, US.

While studying at Cairo University, he was selected to head the foreign affairs department at the University newspaper, Sawt Al-Gamea, Arabic for "Voice of the University". He started his professional career at Al-Ahram when he was a student and continued his career as a Foreign Affairs Editor until he resigned in 2006.

== Career ==
Yasser Thabet is a member of the Egyptian Journalists Syndicate. He was among the main journalists who started a unique experience in Egyptian journalism, called Independent Journalism. The cornerstone of this experience was the newspaper Al-Dostour. In 1991, he was among the founders of the first daily business newspaper in Egypt, titled Al Alam Al Youm, Arabic for "World Today". In 2001, he became the managing editor of Sawt Al-Ummah private-owned newspaper, before leaving for Qatar in August 2002 to be Senior Producer of Al-Jazeera Channel.

In March 2007, Thabet was hired to be the chief editor of news for the U.S.-funded Al-Hurra channel. He was dismissed two months later over his past writing and editorial choices, a decision that was criticized as unfair. He became program editor of Al-Arabiya Channel in Dubai, United Arab Emirates, starting November 2007, before joining Sky News Arabia Channel in Abu Dhabi, UAE, as Director of Output, starting June 2011.

Thabet gave presentations on media issues in UK, Austria, Spain, Turkey, Greece, Canada and US. He has been on the faculty panel of the Salzburg Seminars on two occasions. On 11 June 2009, Yasser Thabet was a speaker at a conference titled Civilian Capacity Building and Democratic Consciousness Raising in Security and Human Rights which was organized in Ankara, Turkey by The Turkish Economic and Social Studies Foundation (TESEV).

== Blogging ==
Thabet writes a blog Qabl Al-Tofan, Arabic for Before The Deluge about history, literature and occasionally sports. In 2008, his blog won the Best Weblog Arabic award in the Deutsche Welle International Weblog Awards, The BOBs, competition.

== Books ==
Thabet is a fiction writer and historian of media, politics and sports in the Middle East. Preoccupied with the problems of death and suffering, his literary works belong to the fantastic and autobiographical genres. His list of books includes the following:

- Fa'id alhanin: al-musiqa alati tasharuna (Nostalgia Excess: Music that Enchants Us) - (2025) Cairo: Dār Zein.
- Qisat kurat al-qadam fi Misr (The Story of Football in Egypt) - (2025) Cairo: Dār Uktub.
- Kafka: Adeeb al-ozla wa ra'id al-kitaba al-kabousiya (Kafka: The Writer of Solitude and Pioneer of Nightmarish Writing) - (2025) Cairo: Dār Uktub.
- Marquez: Malik al-waqieia al-sihria (Marquez, King of Magical Realism) - (2025) Cairo: Dār Uktub.
- 'ihsas ‘aber bel-abadiya (A Fleeting Sense of Eternity) - (2025) Cairo: Dār Uktub.
- Mo’ajam al-‘alam (Dictionary of Pain) - (2025) Cairo: Dār Uktub.
- Thawrat al-ma’edah (Table Revolution) - (2025) Cairo: Dār Almoharer.
- Tarekh kawkab al-Qahera (History of Planet Cairo) - (2025) Cairo: Dār Almoharer.
- 'ayam al-azama wāl-lanhidari: Safahat min tarikh almahrusa (Days of Greatness and Decline: Pages from the History of Egypt) -(2025) Cairo: Dār Zein.
- 'akbar khuda fi al-tarekh: Hekayat did al-nisyan (The Biggest Hoax in History: Tales Against Oblivion) -(2025) Cairo: Dār Zein.
- Cinema al-naht fi al-zaman (Sculpting in Time Cinema) - (2024) Cairo: Dār Zagel.
- Korat al-nadam (The Ball of Regret) - (2025) Cairo: Dār Nessan.
- Cinema al-nehayat al-khalida (Cinema of Eternal Endings) - (2024) Cairo: Dār Uktub.
- Hayaat jamila marat bijanibina (A Beautiful Life Passed by Us) (2024) - Cairo: Dār Zein.
- Burtuqal wa'ashwaku: 'adab birayihat al-barud (Oranges and Thorns: Literature with the Smell of Gunpowder) - (2024) Cairo: Dār Almoharer.
- Cinema al-qulub al-waheeda (Lonely Hearts Cinema) - (2024) Cairo: Dār Almoharer.
- Salateen al-nagham: Min al-mowashahat 'iila al-musiqa al-taswiria (Sultans of Nagham: From Muwashahat to Soundtracks) - (2024) Cairo: Dār Uktub.
- Asr al-mudarajat (The Era of Terraces) - (2024) Cairo: Dār Uktub.
- Dalil musawar lil-mala’ika (An Illustrated Guide to Angels) - (2024) Cairo: Dār Almoharer.
- kushuf al-khalidin (Revelations of the immortals) - (2024) Cairo: Dār Uktub.
- 'afdal shorika’y fi al-jarima (My Best Partners in Crime) - (2024) Cairo: Dār Zein.
- Sunduq āl‘ajayib: Min al-dirama ila al-maqalib wal-fawazir (Box of Wonders: From Drama to Pranks and Riddles) - (2023) Cairo: Dār Almoharer.
- Tarekh ālġhenāʾ ālšhaʿby: Min ālmawwāl ila ālrāb (History of Popular Singing: From Mawwal to Rapping) (2023) Cairo: Dār Dawen.
- Tarekh ālyahwd fi miṣr wālʿālm ālʿarby: Sanwāt ālẓel wālġhomwḍ (History of Jews in Egypt and Arab World: Years of Shadow and Mystery) (2023) Cairo: Dawen Publishing.
- Miṣr ālmodhešha (Amazing Egypt) (2023) Cairo: Ibiidi Publishing.
- Sīrat ālġhobār (The Dust Memoirs) (2023) Cairo: Dār Zein.
- 10 qobolāt mansīyah (10 Forgotten Kisses) (2023) Cairo: Dār Zein.
- Mišhwār ālkoẖlod: Sīrat Moḥamed Salāḥ (The Eternity Course: Mohamed Salah’s Memoirs) (2023) Cairo: Dār Oktob.
- Generālāt kurat al-qadam: Min Maradona ila Haaland (Soccer Generals: From Maradona to Haaland) (2023) Cairo: Dār Oktob.
- Game’a al-shahawat (The Desires Collector) - (2022) Cairo: Dār Zein.
- Saqf al‘alam (Roof of the World) - (2022) Cairo: Dār Zein.
- Kol youm Shawq (Everyday a Longing) – (2021) Cairo: Dār Merit.
- Almusiqaa alaria: 'asatir fi amlakat alghina' (The Naked Music: Legends in The Music Kingdom) - (2021) Cairo: Dār Zein.
- Tuqus aljunun (Rites of Madness) -(2021) Cairo: Ibiidi Publishing.
- Mkamat alrouh: Dalil ila al-oghniah ala'rbiah (The Soul Standings: A Guide to the Arabic Song) - (2021) Amman: Dār Khtot wthelal.
- Revolutions: How they changed history and what they mean today, Peter Furtado (editor), London: Thames & Hudson Ltd, 2020.
- Hkmah alsikan (The Wisdom of the Legs) - (2020) Cairo: Ibiidi Publishing.
- Ṣirā’ taht al-kobah (Conflict under the Doom) - (2020) Cairo: Dār Zein.
- Al-roumansyoun (The Romantics) - (2020) Cairo: Dār Zein.
- A’adat al-hob al-sia’ah (Bad Love Habits) - (2020) Cairo: Dār Uktub.
- Khodoush Idhafiah (Additional Scratches) - (2020) Cairo: Dar al-adham.
- Ithm Kadim (An Old Sin) - (2019) Cairo: Dar al-adham.
- Wala’ (Fondness) - (2019) Cairo: Dār al-adham.
- Al-harb fi Manzl Taha Hussein (The War inside Taha Hussein's House) - (2019) Cairo: Dār Zein.
- O'shak wa Shyatin: Tarikh al-sinma al-Mamnoua' (Lovers and Demons: The Forbidden History of Cinema) - (2019) Cairo: Dār Uktub.
- A'bna'a al-boka'a (Sons of Crying) - (2019) Cairo: Dār Zein.
- Al-a'hdaf La Ta'tthr (Goals Don’t Apologize) - (2019) Cairo: Dār Uktub.
- Mraa'i al-tha'ab (Pastures of Wolves) - (2018) Cairo: Dār Zein.
- Yotel al-khajal min hakebateha (Shyness overlooks from her Bag) - (2018) Cairo: Dār Zein.
- Al-malek wal-fursan al-arab'ah: Arab Russia 2018 (The King and Four Knights: Russia's Arabs in 2018) - (2018) Cairo: Kunūz.
- Mawsoua't Ka'as Al-Alam: Min Uruguay 1930 ila Russia 2018 (World Cup Encyclopedia: From Uruguay 1930 to Russia 2018) - (2018) Cairo: Kunūz.
- Qabl al-throuah bikalil (Just before Climax) - (2018) Cairo: Dār Zein.
- Kanoun ra's al-samakah: Ummah fi Khatar (The Fish Head Law: A Nation in Danger)- (2018) Cairo: Dār Delta.
- Al-Jish wal-Daoulah: Idarat al-Bilad wal-ibad (The Army and State: Administering the Country and People) - (2018) Cairo: Dār Zein.
- Losous wa Awtan (Thieves and Countries) - (2018) Cairo: Markaz al-Ḥaḍārah al-ʻArabīyah.
- Fasedoun wallah a'alam (Corrupt People – God Knows Best) - (2017) Cairo: Dār Delta.
- Al-Wazīr fī al-thallājah: Kawalees Sena'at wa Inheyar Al-Hokoumat fi Misr (The Minister in the Fridge: The Backstage Formation and Fall of Governments in Egypt) - (2017) Cairo: Dār Delta.
- Ahl al-ḍaḥik wa-al-ʻadhāb (The People of Laughter and Anguish) - (2017) Cairo: Dār Uktub.
- Sīrat al-ladhdhah wa-al-jins fī Miṣr (The Biography of Pleasure and Sex in Egypt) - (2017) Cairo: Dār Uktub.
- Seerat Al-Latha wal-Jens fi Misr (The Biography of Pleasure and Sex in Egypt (2017) Cairo: Dar Oktob.
- Mawsoua't Hassad Al-Olympiad: Al-Dawrat Al-Olympiya fi 120 Sanah (Summer Olympics Encyclopedia: Olympic Games in 120 Years) (2016) Cairo: Kenouz.
- Pashawat wa Obash: Al-Tareekh Al-Siri lil-fasad (Pashas and Canaille: The Secret History of Corruption) (2016) Cairo: Markaz Al-Hadhara Al-Arabiya.
- Khenjr fil Mira'ah: Nossos wa Woujouh Mansiya (A Dagger in The Mirror: Forgotten Texts and Faces) (2016) Cairo: Dar Oktob.
- Al-Mawt 'ala El-Tareeka El-Misriya (Death on the Egyptian Way) (2016) Cairo: Dar Oktob.
- Har'ek Al-Tafkeer wal Takfeer (Fires of Thinking and Excommunication) (2016) Cairo: Dar Oktob.
- Jamrtan: Tamareen 'ala El-Nesyan (Two Embers: Exercises on Forgetfulness) (2016) Cairo: Dar Oktob.
- Al-A'sa wal-Matrakah: Sera'a Al-Solta wal-Kadha' (The Stick and Hammer: the Struggle between Power and Judiciary), (2015) Cairo: Dar Oktob
- Watan Mahalak Ser (A Home Which Rounds in Circles), (2015) Cairo: Dar Oktob
- Al-Mutala'boun bel-'ouqool: Saqtat Al-I'lam fi Misr (Mind Manipulators: Media Lapses in Egypt), (2015) Cairo: Dar Oktob.
- Sadiq Al-Rais: Hokam Misr Al-Seryoun (The President's Friend: Egypt Secret Rulers), (2015) Cairo: Dar Oktob
- Horoub Al-Hawanem (Ladies Wars), (2015) Cairo: Dar Oktob
- Deen Misr: Omaraa Al-Dam wal-Video (Egypt's Religion: Warlords of Blood and Video), (2015) Cairo: Dar Oktob
- Hokam Misr min Al-Malakiya ila Al-Sisi (Egypt Rulers from Kingdom to Al-Sisi), (2015) Cairo: Dar Al-Hayat
- Misr Qabl Al-Montage (Egypt before Editing), (2015) Cairo: Dar Delta
- Ghorfat Khal'a El-Malabes: Wogoh wa Keyasat (Fitting Room: Faces and Measurements), (2014) Cairo: Dar Oktob
- Zanb (Guilt), (2014) Cairo: Dar Oktob
- Agmal Al-Ktalah (The Most Beautiful Killers), (2014) Cairo: Dar Oktob
- Al-Sera'a ala Misr: The'ab Mubarak wal-Ahd Al-Gadeed (Conflict over Egypt: Mubarak Wolves and the New Era), (2014) Cairo: Kenouz
- Ayamona Al-Mansiya (Our Forgotten Days), (2014) Beirut: Difaf/ Algiers: Al-Ikhtlaf
- Tahta Me'taf Al-Gharam (Under the Passion Coat), (2014) Cairo: Dar Oktob
- Morawadah (Courting), (2014) Cairo: Dar Oktob
- Zaman Al-'Aela: Safaqat Al-Mal wal-Ikhwan wal-Solta (The Age of Family: Money, Muslim Brotherhood and Power Deals), (2014) Cairo: Dar Merit
- Sena'at Al-Tagheyah: Soqout Al-Nokhab wa Bozor Al-Istebdad (Creating the Tyrant: The Fall of the Elites and the Seeds of Despotism), (2013) Cairo: Dar Oktob

- Ra'is Al-Foras Al-Dhaa'a'ah: Morsi Bayn Misr wal-Jamaa'ah (President of Missed Opportunities: Morsi between Egypt and the Group), (2013) Cairo: Dar Oktob
- Horoub Al-Asheera: Morsi fi Shohor Al-Reeba (Clan Wars: Morsi in Suspicion Months), (2013) Cairo: Dar Oktob
- Mohakmet Al-Ra'is: Al-Bahth a'n Al-Kanoun Al-Ghaa'b (The President on Trial: In search of a Lost Law) – (2013) Cairo: Dar Oktob
- Dawlat Al-Ultras: Asfar Al-Thawrah wa El-Mazbaha (The State of Ultras: Tales of Revolution and Massacre) – (2013) Cairo: Dar Oktob .
- Qisat Al-Tharwah fi Misr (Story of Wealth in Egypt) – (2012) Cairo: Dar Merit .
- Shahqat Al-Ya'eseen: Al-Intihar fi Al'alm Al-Arabi (Gasp of the Desperate: Suicide in the Arab World) – (2012) Cairo: Dar Al-Tanweer .
- Fidhat Al-Dahshah (Silver of Surprise) – (2012) Cairo: Dar Al-Ein .
- Haya Bena Nal'ab: An Al-Awtan wa Al-Awthan(Let Us Play: About Homelands and Pagan Idols) – (2012) Cairo: Dar Oktob .
- Lahazat Twitter (Twitter Moments) – (2011) Cairo: Dar Al-Ein .
- Futuwat wa Effendiya (Bullies and Effendis) – (2010) Cairo: Dar Sefsafa .
- Horoub Korat Al-Qadam (Soccer Wars) – (2010) Cairo: Dar Al-Ein.
- Jra'im bil-Hibr Al-Siri (Crimes in Invisible Ink) – (2010) Cairo: Markaz Al-Hadhara Al-Arabiya.
- Kitab Al-Raghba (Book of Desire) – (2010) Beirut: Arab Scientific Publishers, Inc .
- Film Masri Taweel (A Long Egyptian Film) – (2010) Cairo: Markaz Al-Hadhara Al-Arabiya .
- Yawmeyat Saher Motaqa'ed (Diraies of a Retired Magician) – (2009) Cairo: Dar Al-Ein .
- Jra'im Al-A'atefah fi Misr Al-Nazefah (Crimes of Passion in Bleeding Egypt)- (2009) Beirut: Arab Scientific Publishers, Inc.
- Qabl Al-Tofan: Al-Tarikh Al-Dha'ia lil-Al-Mahrousa fi Modawana Misryia (Before the Deluge: The Missing History of Egypt in an Egyptian Blog)- (2008) Cairo: Mizan Book.
- Jomhouriyat Al-Fawdha: Qisat Inhisar Al-Watan wa Inkisar Al-Mowatin (The Republic of Chaos: A Story of the Decline of the Nation and the Refraction of the Citizen)- (2008) Cairo: Mizan Book.
- Thakerat Al-Qarn Al-Eshrin (Memory of the 20th Century)- (2002) Cairo: Al-Dar Al-Arabiya Lil-Kitab.
- Mawsoua't Ka'as Al–Alam (World Cup Encyclopedia)- (1994) Cairo: Madbouly Al-Saghir.
