= Al Alam Al Youm =

Business newspaper in Egypt

- Type: Business newspaper
- Owner(s): Gn4me Holding Company
- Founder(s): Yasser Thabet; Emad Adeeb
- Founded: 1991; 34 years ago
- Language: Arabic
- Headquarters: Cairo
- Country: Egypt
- Sister newspapers: Nahdet Misr
- Website: Al Alam Al Youm

Al Alam Al Youm (Arabic: العالم اليوم; The World Today) is an Arabic business newspaper published in Cairo, Egypt. It is the first private specialized independent paper of the country.

== History and profile ==
Al Alam Al Youm, based in Cairo, was launched in 1991 as the first business newspaper in Egypt. In addition, it is the first privately owned independent newspaper of the country. Yasser Thabet and Emad Adeeb are the founders of the paper.

The owner of the paper is Good New 4Me Holding Company which also owns Nahdet Misr, another newspaper. As of 2012 Emad Adeeb was the chairman and Lamis Elhadidy was the chief executive officer of the paper. Although the paper billed itself an independent publications both Adeeb and Elhadidy were among the supporters of the former President Hosni Mubarak in the mid-2000s.

It is published six times per week and focuses on business news in relation to Egypt, the Middle East and the other parts of the world. The paper also offers financial analyses. Its target audiences include opinion leaders, businesspeople and decision-makers at multinational and private companies. The paper has offices in Paris, London, Geneva, Bonn, Saudi Arabia, Kuwait, Qatar, Bahrain, Morocco, and Beirut. It publishes an Egyptian edition and a Gulf region edition.

In 2003, the approximate number of its readers was 650,000, and its circulation was 15,000 copies.
