= Ahmed Abdel Rahman Nasser =

Egyptian Air Force officer (1934–2020)

- أحمد عبد الرحمن ناصر
- Born: 29 March 1934
- Died: 15 February 2020 (aged 85)
- Military career
- Allegiance: Egypt
- Branch: Egyptian Air Force
- Service years: 1955-1996
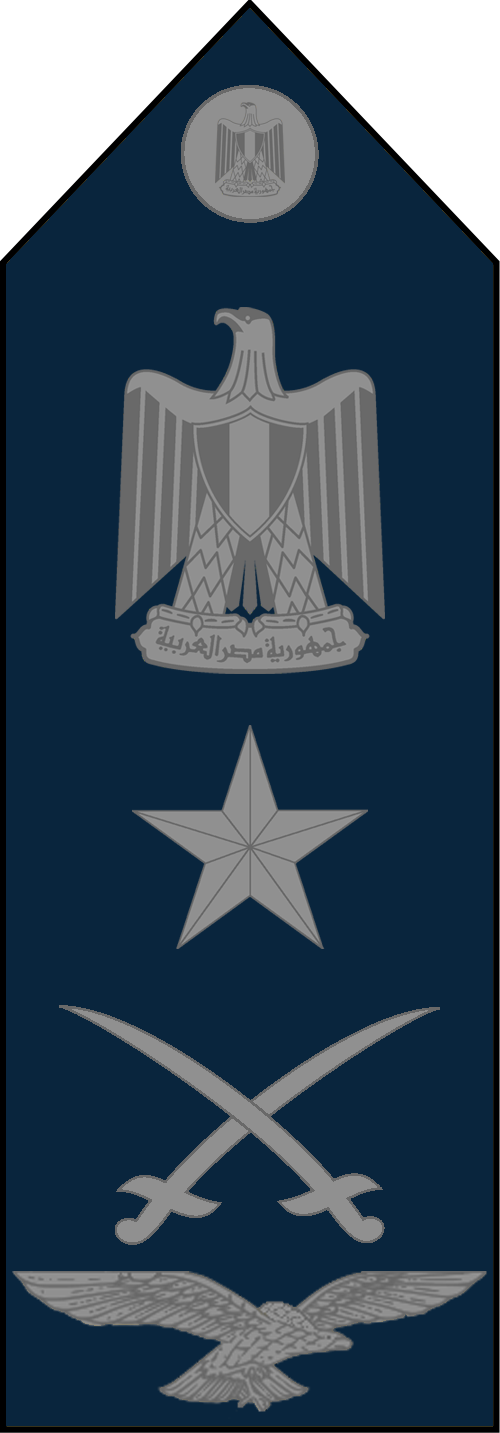
- Rank: Air Marshal
- Conflicts: Yom Kippur War: Air battle of Mansoura

Air Marshal Ahmed Abdel Rahman Nasser (Arabic: أحمد عبد الرحمن ناصر; 29 March 1934 – 15 February 2020) was an officer in the Egyptian Air Force. He graduated from the Egyptian Air Academy in 1956. He served as the commander of the Egyptian Air Force from 1990 until 1996, when he reached retirement age. Thereafter, he was Minister of Civil Aviation until 2002.

Military offices
Preceded by Mohamed Alaa El Din	Commander of the Egyptian Air Force; 1990–1996	Succeeded by Ahmed Shafik
Political offices
New title Ministry established	Minister of Civil Aviation; 2002	Succeeded by Ahmed Shafik
