= Iqraa =

- Country: Saudi Arabia and Egypt

Programming
- Languages: Arabic; English
- Picture format: 1080i HDTV; 576i SDTV

Ownership
- Owner: Arab Radio and Television Network (via Arab Media Corporation)

History
- Launched: 21 October 1998; 27 years ago by Saleh Abdullah Kamel

Links
- Website: iqraa.com

Iqraa TV also spelt IQRA TV (Arabic: اقرأ iqraʾ "read") is a satellite and internet television channel owned by Saleh Abdullah Kamel's Arab Media Corporation. It was founded in 1998. The channel promotes itself as a "Muslim family's safe haven", presenting religious and social programming. The Iqraa channel says its vision is;

Iqraa Channel seeks to meet the viewers' needs through presenting a number of serious programs on the viewers' everyday life problems, serving their spiritual, cultural, social and economic interests, from an Islamic perspective with a modern vision.

and that part of its mission is;

Iqraa Channel also aims at presenting the true moderate face of Islam to people in the West where media does not present an objective view on the Islamic Law.

== Name ==
The word iqraʾ is of Classical Arabic origin which literally means "read/recite" (imperative) from what is believed by Muslims to be the first word revealed to Muhammad in the Quran.

== Educating non-Arab Muslims ==
Iqraa International states that its main mission is "to educate Islam to non-Arab Muslims, and reveal misconceptions and clarifying the teachings of Islam."

The educational focus of Iqraa's strategy is evidenced in its programming, which address a range of everyday topics from an Islamic perspective. Iqraa International shows includes "The Market", which discusses financial matters from an Islamic perspective and notably features Iqraa owner Sheikh Saleh Abdullah Kamel. "The Balance" is a health and nutrition program incorporating Quranic teachings. Iqraa also produces programming for children, including "Youth Issues" and "The Lives of Noble Figures," a documentary program "that aims to connect Muslim youth with the great leaders of Arab and Muslim history who achieved admirable glories."

Iqraa's international programming is particularly aimed at educating Muslims living in the West on proper Islamic practices. Such programming includes "Muslim Minority" on "Muslims living in the West" and "The Role of the Masjid in the West".

== Availability ==
Iqraa TV is available on four satellites: Nilesat, Badr 3, Badr 2, AsiaSat 5 and Hotbird. It is also available on StarTimes, a Chinese digital television network and Chinasat11

In August 2011, Iqraa International began airing its first English-language programming.

As of 2012, different Iqraa TV channels have become available for viewers in North and South America, Canada, Australia and New Zealand through over-the-top technology on myTV.

== See also ==
- List of Islamic television and radio stations in the United Kingdom
