= ART Teenz =

Defunct television channel

- Official logo
- Broadcast area: Europe and the Arab world
- Network: ART

Programming
- Language: Arabic
- Picture format: 576i (SDTV)

History
- Launched: 23 December 1993; 32 years ago
- Closed: 1 July 2008; 18 years ago
- Former names: ART 3 (1993–1998); ART Children (1998–2000)

Links
- Website: www.artonline.tv

ART Teenz (Arabic: إيه آر تي تينز; originally ART 3 and ART Children) was one of the first children's channel in the Arab world (before Spacetoon), and part of the ART Network. The channel aimed to contribute to the upbringing of Arab children, by providing them with knowledge, experience, innovation, and awareness of what went on in the world at the time.

== History ==
ART Teenz's provided modern religious programmes, films and cartoons. The channel ceased operations on 1 July 2008.
