= Sky News Arabia =

Arabic-language rolling news channel

- Broadcast area: Western Asia; North Africa; International
- Headquarters: Abu Dhabi

Programming
- Language: Arabic

Ownership
- Owner: 2012–2026: Sky Group (Comcast) (50%); International Media Investments (Government of the United Arab Emirates) (50%); 2026–present: International Media Investments (Government of the United Arab Emirates)
- Sister channels: Sky News

History
- Launched: 6 May 2012; 14 years ago

Links
- Website: www.skynewsarabia.com

Availability

Streaming media
- Sky News Arabia: Watch live
- Sling TV: Internet Protocol television

Sky News Arabia (stylized as sky news عربية; Arabic: سكاي نيوز عربية, romanized: Skāy Nyūz ʻArabīyah) is an Arabic 24-hour news channel mainly serving the Middle East and North Africa and headquartered in Abu Dhabi. It was established on 6 May 2012 as a joint venture between UK-based Sky Group and the UAE-based International Media Investments (IMI) corporation, owned by Sheikh Mansour bin Zayed Al Nahyan, a member of the ruling House of Nahyan.

== History ==
BSkyB, then controlled by News Corporation, and Sheikh Mansour bin Zayed Al Nahyan first announced a 50/50 joint venture to operate a free-to-air Arabic-language all-news channel on 29 November 2010. Plans for the channel included a network of offices across the Middle East and North Africa, as well as in London and Washington, DC, and shared access to Sky News' wider international bureaux network. Adrian Wells, head of international news at Sky News, was appointed to lead preparations to launch the channel.

In February 2011, Nart Bouran was hired as Sky News Arabia's first director of news. Bouran was previously director of television at Reuters. Yasser Thabet, former program director at the Saudi-owned Al Arabiya, joined Sky News Arabia as director of output in June 2011 and Nicholas Love was appointed as director of finance.

Al-Waleed bin Talal, the second-largest shareholder in 21st Century Fox, which at the time had a 39.1% stake in BSkyB, announced in September 2011 that he would launch an Arabic-language news channel of his own (named Al-Arab News Channel). The channel closed on the same day it launched.

Preparations at the network's headquarters in the twofour54 media SEZ of Abu Dhabi, began in February 2012. It began broadcasting on 6 May 2012.

On 8 November 2015, Sky News Arabia launched its own radio station at 90.3 FM, which was originally the home of BBC World Service in Arabic. The radio station is live-anchored and broadcasts news, weather, sports, traffic and stock market updates and political discussions in randomized blocks. Specialized segments are created specifically for morning, early afternoon, and early evening hours. Several television programmes can also be heard as well.

On 31 May 2026, Sky announced that it had withdrawn from ownership of Sky News Arabia following an agreement with IMI, which also provided for the channel's continued usage of the Sky News brand.

== Broadcasting ==
Sky News Arabia is broadcast to more than 50 million households in the MENA region on satellite and cable providers, as well as over the internet and mobile apps. It is available free-to-air on Nilesat 201, Arabsat, Hot Bird and Astra.

It is available in the United States, Canada, South America, Australia and New Zealand through myTV's platform. It is also available on Sky Channel 788 in the United Kingdom and Ireland.

== Facilities ==
Sky News Arabia's headquarters are in Abu Dhabi's twofour54 media township. The technical integration process at the studio was carried out from April 2011 to February 2012 in collaboration with Television Systems Limited.

The facility consists of one large single studio, which houses several permanent sets used for different programs. It also consists of a 10-meter-wide video wall.

== Content ==
At the time of its launch, Sky News Arabia claimed a commitment to independent reporting and avoiding partisan programming. However, concerns were raised about the joint venture with Sheikh Mansour affecting its editorial independence. The network announced that it would be governed under a six-member editorial advisory committee charged with oversight of its editorial output, including two executives from News Corporation and the executive editors of Sky News and The Times.

In 2017, amid the Qatar diplomatic crisis, Sky News Arabia aired an Emirati-backed documentary alleging links between Qatar's government and al-Qaeda member Khalid Sheikh Mohammed. The official Qatar News Agency, which claimed to have been hacked prior to the onset of the diplomatic crisis, later tapped law firm Carter-Ruck to file a complaint to UK media regulator Ofcom against Sky News Arabia and Saudi-owned Al Arabiya for "violating impartiality code and accuracy in news' sourcing". The channel's coverage of the assassination of Jamal Khashoggi in 2018 was largely critical of Qatar and supportive of the government of Saudi Arabia.

In November 2025, the government of Sudan banned Sky News Arabia from operating inside Sudan after a Sky News Arabia report claimed the security and humanitarian situation had stabilised after the capture of El Fasher by the rebel Rapid Support Forces (RSF), after having sent a reporter to El Fasher who was married to a senior official in the RSF parallel government. Subsequent reports by Sky News Arabia denied that there was evidence on the ground for the El Fasher massacre. Accusations of propaganda and genocide denial by Sky News Arabia prompted Sky to consider the termination of its joint venture with IMI.

On 16 September 2026, Algerian authorities withdrew the accreditation of the Algiers bureau of Sky News Arabia. The decision came days after Algeria announced the severance of diplomatic relations with the United Arab Emirates.
