= Abdel Moneim Al Ameri =

Emirati singer

Abdul Menaem
- Birth name: Abdul Menam Al Ameri
- Born: Abu Dhabi, United Arab Emirates
- Genres: Arabic music
- Occupation(s): Singer, musician
- Instrument: composer
- Years active: 1998–present
- Website: www.mehadhamad.ae

Abdul Menaem Al Ameri (Arabic: عبد المنعم العامري), also known as Abdul Menaem Al Ameri, is an Emirati singer.

== Early life ==
Al-Ameri was a football player but he was forced out from fields due to an injury after spending nine years with Al Ain Club.

== Discography ==
=== Albums ===
- She Wanted Fancy (1998)
- Transparent (2000)
- El Asl (2003)
- Close to You Darling (2004)
- Amiri (2006)
- The Legend (2009)
