= Arab Radio and Television Network =

Arabic-language TV network based in Saudi Arabia

Arab Radio and Television Network (ART)
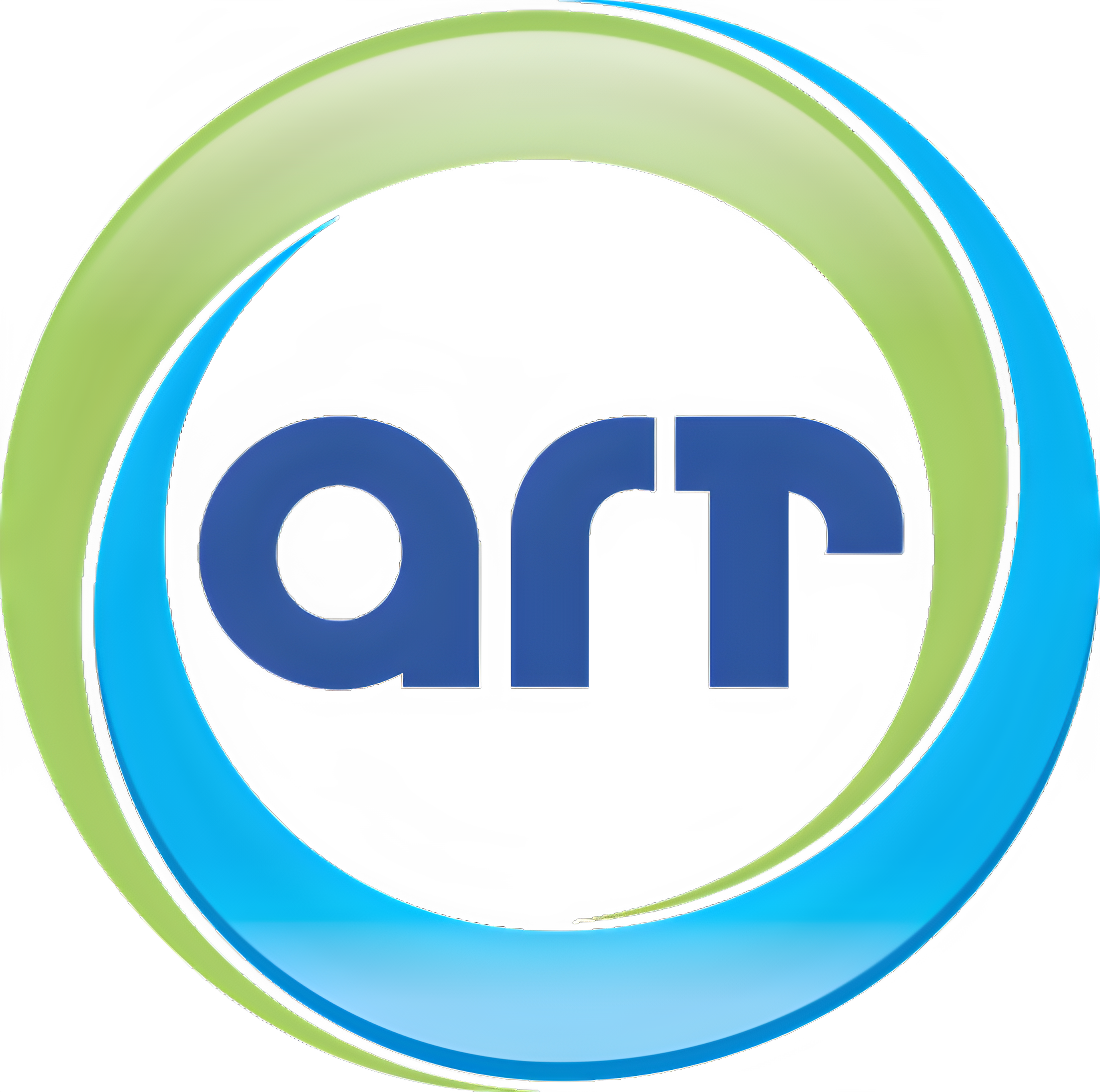
- Type: Private
- Industry: Telecommunication
- Founded: 15 October 1993; 33 years ago
- Headquarters: Jeddah, Saudi Arabia and Cairo, Egypt
- Products: Direct-broadcast satellite
- Website: www.artonline.tv

Arab Radio and Television Network (acronym: ART) is an Arabic-language television network characterized by its multitude of channels. It is based in Jeddah, Saudi Arabia.

== History and profile ==
ART was founded on 15 October 1993 by Saleh Abdullah Kamel, a Saudi businessman and is a private company specializing in family entertainment, including movies, music and sport.

ART was particularly known in Saudi Arabia for its exclusive sports event broadcasts, especially the Saudi Leagues. The network lost a significant amount of its audience share after the launch of many similar free-to-air channels like the Rotana network, owned by Al-Waleed bin Talal. At the time of launch, ART produced over 6,000 live and recorded shows per year, including family-oriented dramas, series, plays, sports programs, music videos and documentaries.

ART is broadcasting via the Arabsat, Nilesat and Hot Bird satellites. Most ART Channels are encrypted using Irdeto 2 Encryption. ART's technical broadcast facilities are based in Jordan Media City in Amman, Jordan.

On 24 November 2009, Al Jazeera purchased all of ART's sport channels which had the license to broadcast the FIFA World Cup 2010 and 2014 matches. This decision led to calls to boycotts of Al Jazeera by Arab football fans who were accustomed to watching major football events for free; and turned broadcast rights into a political issue where governments —who often purchased broadcasts and aired them locally for no charge, had to be involved. ART Sports was subsequently rebranded as Al Jazeera Sports (since 2014, BeIN Sports). Later that year, ART also sold most of its remaining entertainment channels to Orbit Showtime Network.

== ART channels list ==
Arab Radio and TV Network consists of the following channels:

ART Hikayat logo

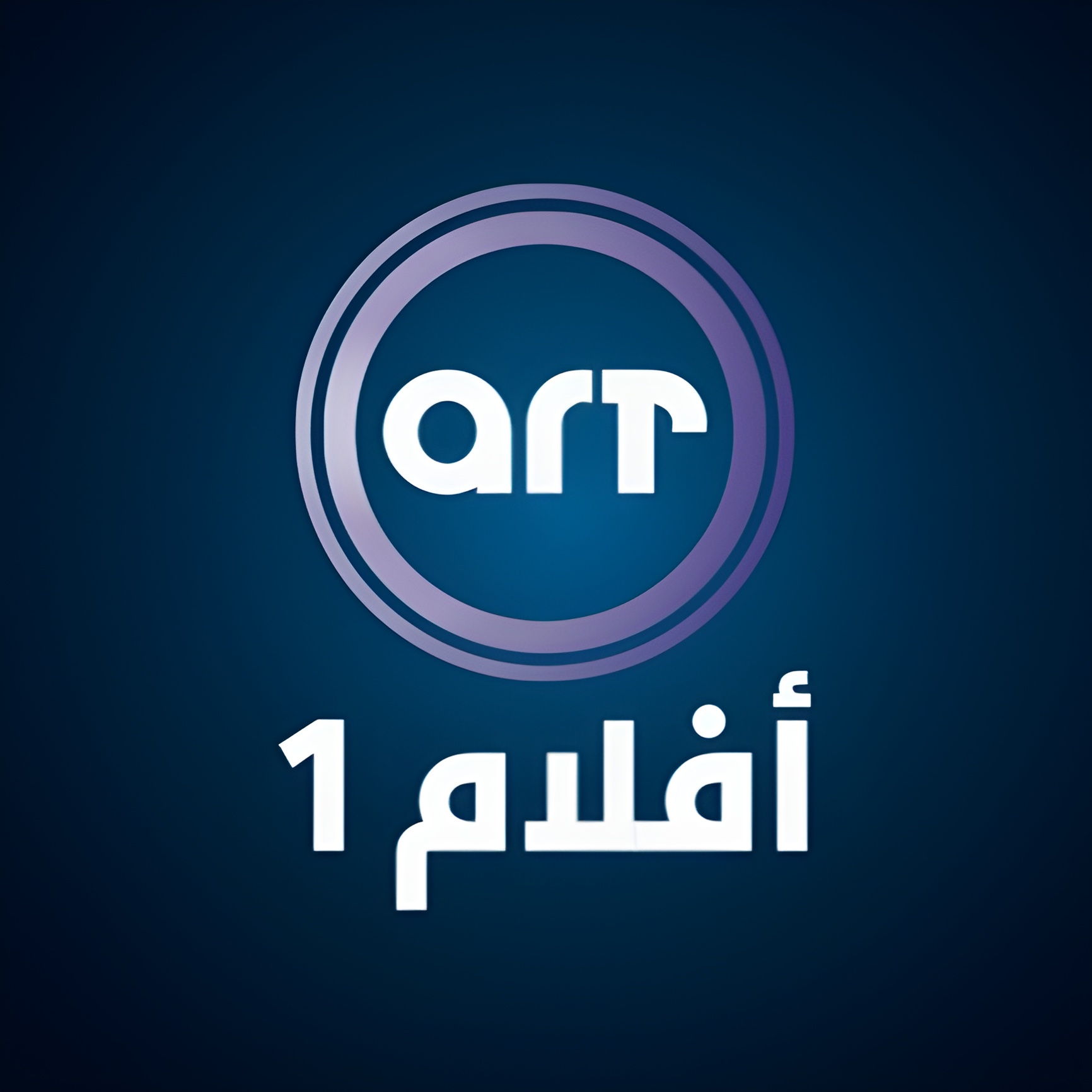
ART Aflam 1 logo

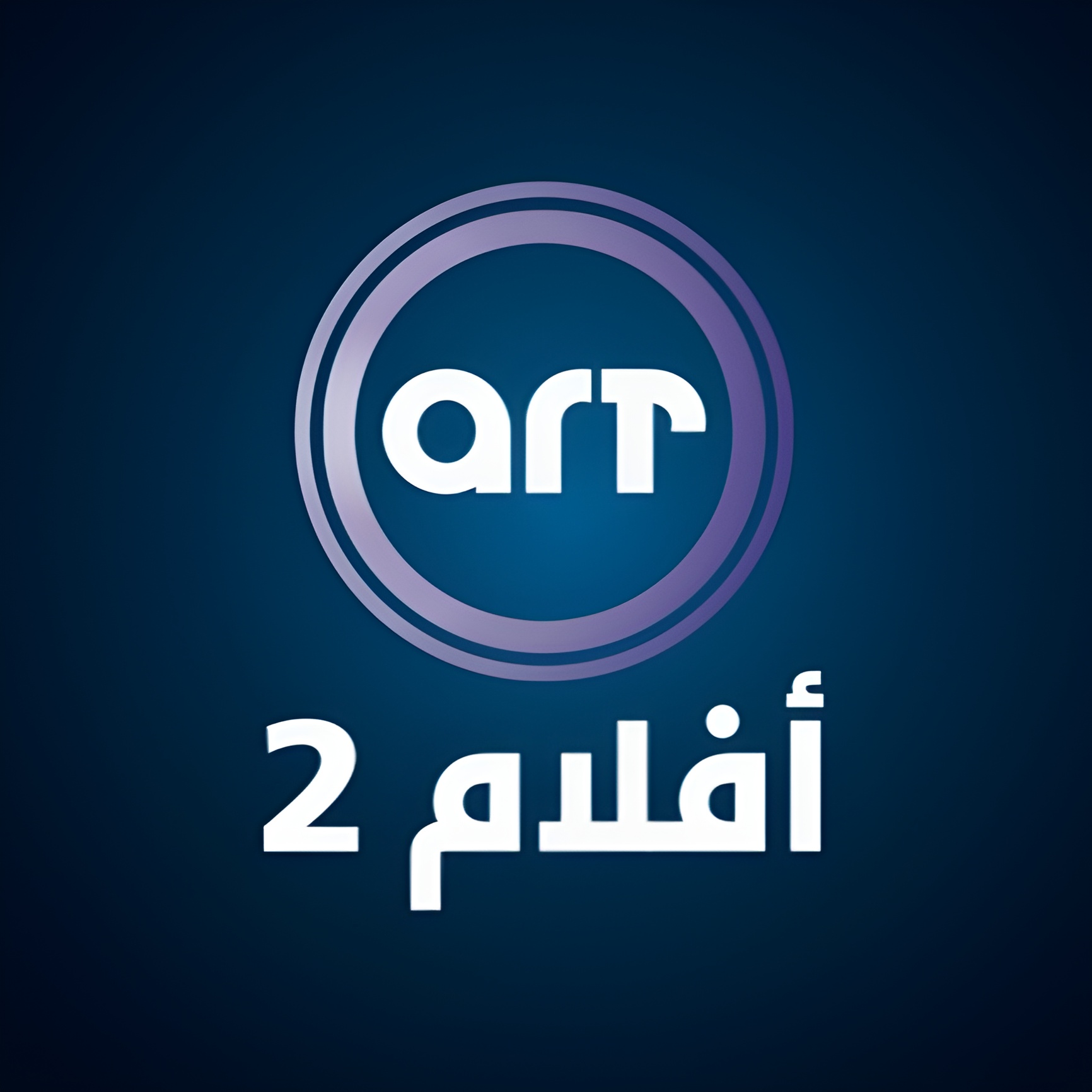
ART Aflam 2 logo

=== Current channels ===
TV

- ART Aflam 1: Arabic movie channel one
- ART Aflam 2: Arabic movie channel two
- ART Cinema: Arabic movie channel three
- ART Hikayat: Arabic drama channel
- ART Hikayat 2: Egyptian drama channel
- ART Hikayat HD: Arabic series Pop-up channel in HD during Ramadan
- ART Hikayat 2 HD: Arabic series channel in HD during Ramadan
- Cima: Arabic movie channel four
- Iqraa: Arabic Islamic channel
- ART Movies Arabic movie channel five, broadcast in North America, Asia-Pacific and Australia
- ART: International Arabic channel, broadcast in North America and Brazil
- ART Tarab: Arabic classic music and opera channel, broadcast in North America and Australia

Radio

- ART Music Radio
- Dhikr Radio for the Holy Quran

=== Former channels ===
ART branded channels

- ART Eye
- ART Sport 1-9
- ART Prime Sport
- ART Al Zaeem
- ART Al 3amed
- ART Al Laith
- ART Al Alami
- ART 1
- ART 2
- ART 3
- ART 4
- ART 5
- ART Children
- ART Music
- ART Monasabat
- ART Shopping
- ART Hikayat Zaman
- ART Teenz
- ART Al-Talimiyah
- ART Open University
- Ayen Al-Awail
- ART Travel
- ART Movie World
- ART Hikayat Kaman
- ART Hikayat Kaman HD
- ART America
- ART Variety
- Iqraa International: Non-Arabic-speaking Islamic channel (English and French)

Distributed channels

- Jetix
- Hallmark Channel
- Channel [V]
- National Geographic Channel
- Nat Geo Adventure
- Nat Geo Wild
- CBS Reality
- Cartoon Network
- Boomerang
- BabyTV
- Discovery Science
- Animal Planet
- Sky News
- Star Plus
- Star News
- Sony Max
- Sony Entertainment Television Asia
- Star Gold
- ITV Granada
- Zee TV
- Zee Cinema
- NDTV 24x7
- Star One
- TCM
- Sahara One
- B4U Movies
- B4U Music
- Indus Vision
- Geo TV
- Kairali TV
- Jaya TV

== See also ==
- Showtime Arabia
- Orbit Communications Company
- List of direct broadcast satellite providers
- List of digital television deployments by country
