= ON E =

Egyptian television channel

ON
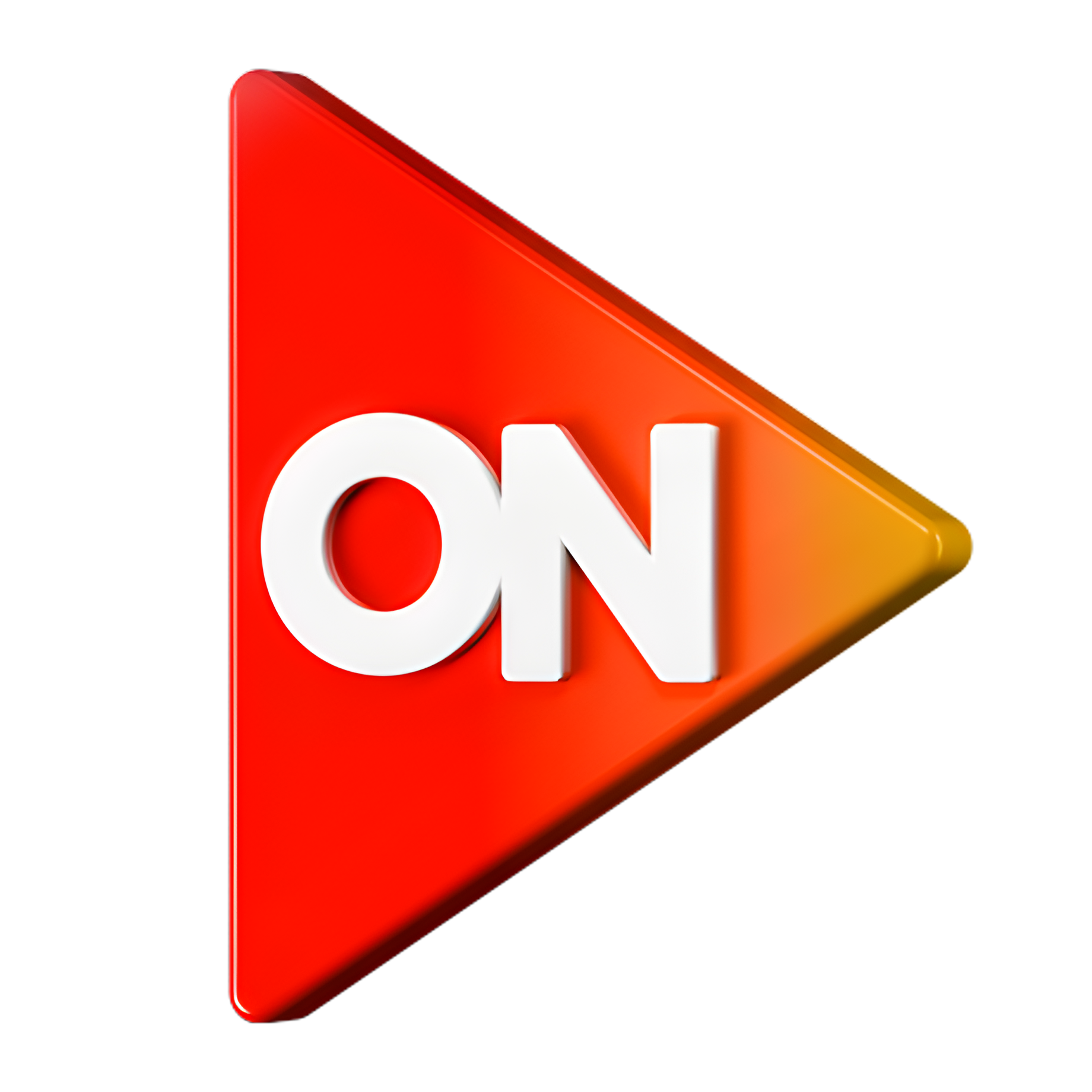
- Type: Satellite television network
- Country: Egypt
- Broadcast area: In most areas
- Headquarters: 6 October (city), Egypt

Programming
- Language: Egyptian Arabic

Ownership
- Owner: United Media Services
- Parent: National Media Authority
- Key people: Naguib Sawiris, Tarak Ben Ammar, Yosri Fouda, Reem Maged

History
- Launched: 6 October 2008

ON (Arabic: أون), also known as ON E (Arabic: أون إي) and formerly known as ON TV (Arabic: أون تي في), is an Egyptian digital television network. It is owned by the United Media Services (UMS) since 2016. Founded on 6 October 2008 as “ON Television” or simply as “ON TV”, the network positions itself on its website as "the only politically independent Egyptian television station."

== Shows ==
- Hearts Full, presented by Nadia Amara
- The Best Dish, presented by Chef Alaa El Sherbiny
- El Container, presented by Ahmed Dawood
- Capitano
- Kol Yom
- Style Talk
- Kol El Zawaya

== Sister networks ==
In September 2011, Hawa Ltd. launched ONTVLive, a 24-hour news network with a yearly budget of $3 million. ONTV and ONTVLive shared the same editorial staff and employs approximately 30 journalists scattered throughout Egypt. ONTVLive had attempted to orient itself as more pan-Arab than ONTV, employing presenters from other Arab nations, stationing correspondents in Sudan and Libya, and applying to the government of Qatar for the accreditation of an ONTVLive journalist to be stationed in Doha. By 2016, ONTVLive changed its name to ON Live, and by 2018, ON Live ceased to exist along with DMC Sports.

In 2011, Hawa Ltd. also launched ONTVRamadan, a temporary channel that aired during the month of Ramadan and broadcast soap operas and "big budget drama."

In 2016, ON Time Sports, a television channel that is part of the ON TV network, was launched as ON Sport, but since 2020, Time Sports and ON Sport have merged into one TV channel, creating ON Time Sports. It broadcasts sports-related TV shows.

In 2017, ON Drama, a television channel that is part of the ON TV network, was launched. The channel broadcasts many Egyptian TV series.

In 2018, ON Time Sports 2, a television channel that is part of the ON TV network, was launched as ON Sport 2, but since 2020, Time Sports and ON Sport 2 have merged into one TV channel, creating ON Time Sports 2. A radio station called ON Sport FM was also launched in the same year as ON Sport 2 (now ON Time Sports 2).

In 2020, ON Time Sports 3, a television channel that is part of the ON TV network, was launched after the merger of Time Sports and ON Sport to create ON Time Sports.

== Ahmed Shafik interview and resignation ==
On Wednesday, March 2, 2011, ONTV announced on its website that Prime Minister Ahmed Shafik, who had been appointed by ousted president Hosni Mubarak before his resignation, would be joined by ONTV financier Naguib Sawiris and Kamel Abu El-Maged on talkshow host Reem Maged's program, Baladna bel Masry. This discussion was to be followed by Yosri Fouda's hosting of novelist Alaa Al Aswany, author of The Yacoubian Building, and veteran journalist Hamdy Kandeel on the program Akher Kilam. The first two hours of the broadcast featured Shafik responding to softball questions by Sawiris as he defended the Egyptian government and the Supreme Council of the Armed Forces' handling of the post-revolution transition. Shafik agreed to stay on after midnight, however, to join the discussion with Al Aswany and Kandeel. Al Aswany was highly critical of Shafik over the remaining two hours in the broadcast, and Shafik became clearly irritated. At one point, Al Aswany accused Shafik, saying "[i]f your son had been one of those who got run over by the police cars, you would not have remained silent like that." Shafik attempted to defend his previously-publicized plan to turn Tahrir Square into an Egyptian version of London's Hyde Park, where protesters could gather to make speeches. Al Aswany responded, accusing him of "ignoring the more than 300 people who died in the protests and wanting to give out 'sweets and chocolate.'" The Wall Street Journal wrote that Shafik retorted, "'wanting the people to stay in a clean place is wrong?' ... 'We should find out who killed them first,' answered Mr. Aswany." Al Aswany furthermore accused Shafik of being a holdover of the regime that Egyptians had struggled to topple, and that he was unfit to represent Egyptians in the post-revolution era.

The episode led to Shafik's announcement of his resignation as Egyptian Prime minister the next day. His poor performance and the vocal reaction to his responses, as well as the response to Al Aswany's fierce questioning of him, allegedly "helped push Egypt's military rulers into acceding to protester demands and pushing out Mr. Shafiq". Importantly, the episode was argued to be "the first real political debate between a prime minister and opposition figures in Egypt", as interviews of government figures under the Mubarak regime generally involved sets of prepared questions and would never be so contentious. The interview has been called "the episode that toppled an Egyptian cabinet. The Los Angeles Times dubbed the interview "the TV talk show that played the biggest part in speeding up his imminent resignation."

== See also ==
- ON Sport FM
- Reem Maged
- Yosri Fouda
- Bassem Youssef
