= ON Sport FM =

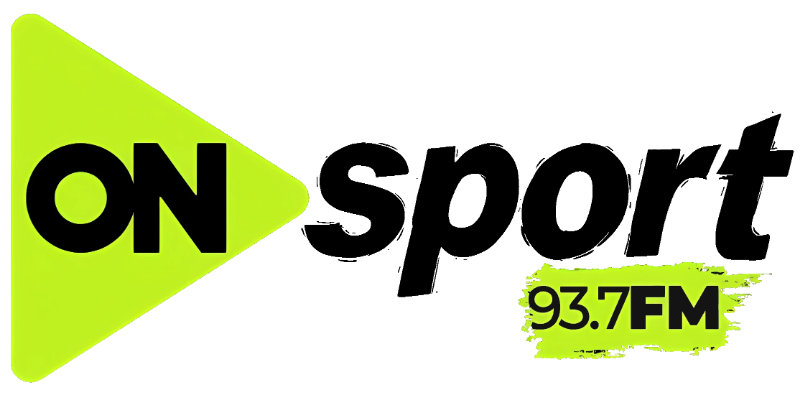
- Giza; Egypt
- Frequency: 93.7 MHz
- Branding: ON Sport FM

Programming
- Language: Egyptian Arabic
- Format: sports radio

Ownership
- Owner: National Media Authority
- Operator: United Media Services

History
- First air date: 21 September 2018

ON Sport FM (Arabic: أون سبورت إف إم) is an Egyptian radio station. It began broadcasting at the frequency of 93.7 at 10:00 PM on Friday, 21 September 2018, featuring a group of senior analysts and sports commentators.

Opened by anchor Magdy Kamel and journalist Saif Zaher, ON Sport FM is the first private sports station in the country. Originally called “drn,” the station switched its format from a general entertainment one in its second year. Ahmed Schubert celebrated the station’s reestablishment as a sports center by conducting live interviews inside the studio with staffers Kamel, Zaher, Othman Abaza, and Mohammed Al-Mahmoudi.
