= Air battle of Mansoura =

1973 battle of the Yom Kippur War

Coordinates: 31°02′27″N 31°23′02″E

- Part of the Yom Kippur War
Date	October 14, 1973
Location	Nile Delta, Egypt
Result	Egyptian victory

Belligerents
Egypt	Israel

Commanders and leaders
Hosni Mubarak (EAF); Ahmed Abdel Rahman Nasser (No. 104 Wing)	Benny Peled (IAF)

Strength
62 MiG-21 aircraft	160 F-4 Phantom II and A-4 Skyhawk aircraft

Casualties and losses
6 aircraft lost and 2 pilots killed in total: 3 aircraft shot down; 3 aircraft out of fuel, crashed	17 aircraft shot down (Egyptian claim) 2 aircraft shot down (Israeli claim)

The air battle of Mansoura was an air battle that took place in 1973 during the Yom Kippur War between the Egyptian Air Force (EAF) and the Israeli Air Force (IAF) near the town of El Mansoura, in the Nile Delta.

The Israeli air force launched air strikes on October 14 against the Egyptian air bases at Tanta and Mansoura. Israeli aircraft were spotted approaching from the Mediterranean Sea. The 104th Air Wing of the Egyptian air force scrambled its fighters, and received reinforcements from other air bases. The air battle began at 15:15 and lasted 53 minutes. The Egyptian commander was Hosni Mubarak. According to Egyptian sources, multiple Israeli fighters were shot down; this is disputed by Israeli sources.

== Background ==
The 104th Air Wing had three squadrons equipped with MiG-21MF fighters; two squadrons were stationed at Mansoura, tasked with interception and air defense, and the third was stationed at the Tanta air base to defend both air bases. The IAF had made several attacks on the Mansoura air base from October 6 onwards, but failed due to dense Egyptian SAM defenses.

At dawn on October 14, when Egyptian forces made their advance towards the Sinai Mitla and Gedy Passes, the ground forces were given ground support by MiG-17s, Su-7s, Su-20s and Mirage III fighter bombers. These in turn were given fighter cover by the 104th's MiG-21s. Although the Egyptian offensive on October 14 was a failure and culminated in heavy losses, the IAF was determined to destroy the 104th Air Wing's capabilities. A massive air strike would be launched against air bases in Salihiya, Mansoura and Tanta.

In the aftermath of the Six-Day War, when the EAF lost almost all its aircraft on the ground to an Israeli preemptive strike, the Egyptians constructed 500 concrete shelters on 20 major airbases to prevent the aircraft from being destroyed on the ground in a future conflict.

== Initial contact ==
On October 14, when the Egyptians advanced from their bridgeheads along the Suez Canal, an Israeli air strike was expected to come against the Mansoura air base sooner or later, and consequently a number of MiG-21s were kept at full alert at the end of the runway with their pilots, ready for immediate take-off. As of 15:00, there was still no indication of an impending enemy attack.

At 15:15, air observation posts on the Mediterranean Sea notified EAF command that 20 Phantoms were approaching in south-west direction towards the Delta, flying over Port Said. The commander of the EAF, Air Marshal Hosni Mubarak, ordered General Naser to scramble 16 MiG-21s. The EAF command believed the enemy aircraft were only a decoy meant to lure the MiG-21s away from the airbase, so that further waves of aircraft could attack the air base uninterrupted. Hence the fighter pilots were ordered to create a protective umbrella over the air base. Most importantly, they were instructed not to pursue and engage enemy aircraft before they had reached their target.

The pilots were puzzled by the order, not knowing the reason behind it, as they expected to immediately engage the enemy after scrambling. In the event, the Israeli fighters continued to fly in broad circles for some time until, when it became clear the Egyptians would not leave the vicinity of the Mansoura air base, the Phantoms withdrew back to the sea.

== Battle ==
Sometime around 15:30, the Egyptian Air Defense Command issued a warning that around sixty enemy aircraft were approaching from the Mediterranean Sea in three directions; one from Port Said, another from Damietta, and the third from Baltim, to the west of Damietta. Mubarak ordered his pilots in the air to intercept them. The 16 MiG-21s forming the air umbrella over Mansoura moved against the Israeli aircraft with the objective of breaking the enemy formations and forcing them to disperse. 16 MiG-21s took off from Mansoura air base to support those in the air, along with eight fighters from Tanta air base, located west of Mansoura. The MiG-21s intercepted the Israeli formation a few dozen kilometers north of Mansoura.

At 15:38, Egyptian radar installations informed the EAF command that a second wave of around 16 Israeli aircraft was coming from over the Mediterranean at very low altitude. The Egyptians scrambled a final eight MiG-21s at Mansoura, while eight MiG-21s from the Abu Hamad air base were called upon to assist. The ensuing air battle was intense, involving large numbers of aircraft; at one point, the battle involved 62 MiG-21s and some 120 Phantoms and A-4 Skyhawks. A few Israeli fighter-bombers reached their target and bombed the runway and the air defenses around the air base. While the final eight aircraft from Mansoura took off, Israeli aircraft were approaching to make their bombing run. Nasr Mousa, piloting one of the eight MiG-21s, spotted an Israeli Phantom lining up against him. Mousa made a sudden, hard right-hand turn that put him on the Phantom's tail. He shot down the Phantom with cannon fire, and no parachutes emerged. Medhat 'Arafa, an Egyptian pilot, recalls "the battle was a frightening sight because I had never seen so many aeroplanes in one area. We were not only dogfighting, but also warning other pilots that they had an enemy on their tail..." The Israeli Phantoms had to abandon their bomb-loads in order to dogfight with the more maneuverable MiG aircraft. Egyptian pilots had to land their aircraft, re-arm, refuel and take-off again within a period of seven minutes. Take-off usually took three minutes, but according to Naser, the pilots were able to accomplish it in one-and-a-half minutes during the air battle.

At 15:52, radars detected another wave of enemy aircraft, estimated to incorporate up to 60 Phantoms and Skyhawks. Eight MiG-21s from 102nd Air Wing were scrambled from Inshas air base, near Cairo. Around 20 MiG-21s that had landed, refueled and re-armed at Mansoura air base were also en route to intercept the Israeli aircraft. An air battle was raging over the Nile Delta village of Dekernis, where Israeli aircraft retreating eastward were being pursued by Egyptian aircraft. A dogfight ensued over this village between the latest Israeli wave and intercepting Egyptian MiG-21s. The commander of this final wave of Israeli aircraft, realizing that the previous waves had failed in their objectives and there were more Egyptian aircraft in the air than expected, decided to withdraw. The last Israeli aircraft left Egyptian airspace at 16:08, and the air battle was over.

== Veracity of claims ==
At 22:00 local time Cairo Radio broadcast “Communiqué Number 39”, announcing several air battles that day over a number of Egyptian airfields, the most intensive over the northern Delta area. It claimed that 15 enemy aircraft had been downed by Egyptian fighters for the loss of three Egyptian aircraft, excluding Israeli aircraft shot down near the Suez Canal.

The following morning, October 15, Israel Radio claimed that the IAF had shot down 15 Egyptian aircraft, a figure later reduced to seven.

Following the war, the EAF concluded that 17 Israeli aircraft had been shot down for the loss of six MiG-21s; three were shot down by Israeli aircraft, two crashed after running out of fuel before the pilots could land, and one was destroyed after sustaining damage from an exploding Israeli Phantom. The pilot of the MiG-21 was Lieutenant Mohamed Adoub who claims to have shot down the Phantom with several bursts of 23 mm cannon fire. His aircraft suffered fatal damage from the debris. Adoub and the Israeli pilot parachuted almost alongside each other. The Israeli pilot, upon landing on the ground, was assailed by angry farmers who nearly killed him, but Adoub stopped them. The Israeli pilot was taken into captivity and hospitalized. In all two Egyptian pilots were killed in action, and the remaining four ejected safely.

The IAF gave up targeting major air bases by October 15, although there was another significant air engagement over the Nile Delta that day.

According to historian Lon Nordeen, the IAF lost only two aircraft on October 14. According to Kenneth Pollack, throughout the war "there were fifty-two major dogfights between the Egyptians and Israelis. In all, the Egyptians succeeded in shooting down 5–8 Israeli aircraft while losing 172 of their own to Israeli fighters". According to Chaim Herzog, a total of 334 Arab aircraft were shot down in air-to-air combat and Egyptian losses accounted for 172 of these. Israeli losses numbered five. The list of fallen IAF pilots mentions no casualties on October 14.

=== Commemorations ===
Egypt's "Air Force Day" was changed from November 2 to October 14 to commemorate the air battle.
