= Mona el-Shazly =

Egyptian talk show host

Mona El Shazly
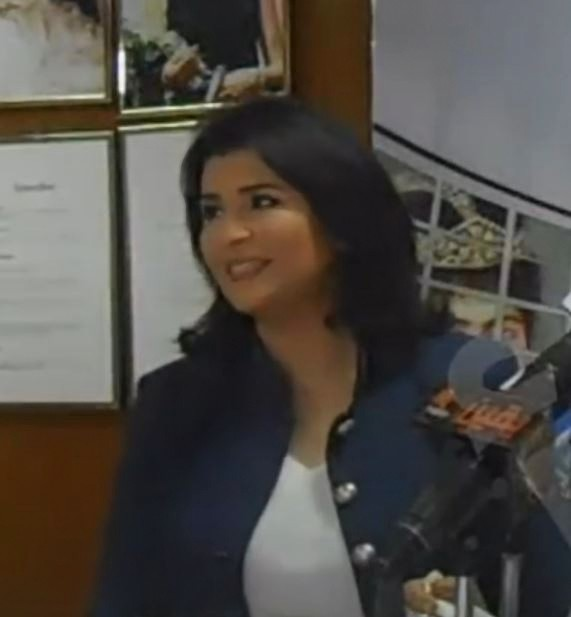
- Mona el-Shazly on June 14, 2015
- Born: September 23, 1973 (age 52); Cairo, Egypt
- Occupation: Talk show host
- Years active: 1996–present
- Known for: Her talk show Al Ashira Masa'an (10 O'Clock)
- Spouse: Samir Youssef
- Children: 3

Mona El Shazly (Arabic: منى الشاذلي, IPA: [ˈmonæ (ʔe)ʃˈʃæzli]) is an Egyptian talk show host. She is known for her talk show Al Ashira Masa'an (10 O'Clock) where she discussed news of the day and interviewed Egyptian and foreign politicians and scientists.

== Early life ==
El Shazly graduated from high school in the United Arab Emirates, then studied Journalism at the American University in Cairo.

== Career ==
El Shazly worked in Public Relations at the Arab Contractors Company.

She hosted several programs on the Saudi-owned Arab Radio and Television Network Channel. She also hosts her on program, Ma3kom Mona El Shazly, on the Egyptian TV channel CBC.

She has been at Dream 2 Channel, a popular independent Egyptian satellite channel, since 2006, hosting Al Ashira Masa'an. "By her own estimate, she is one of the highest paid hosts on Arabic satellite television," a report said. Addressing "government pressure on journalists in Egypt[;] 'They don’t understand that a presenter is not a spokesperson for the government or the regime,' she said. 'I am not a spokesman. But you always have this problem.'"

== Personal life ==
El Shazly is married to Samir Youssef. They have three daughters, including twins.

== TV Programs ==
=== Al Ashira Masa'an ===
Some of the guests that have been featured on the show are:

- Mohamed Elbaradei, former Director General of the International Atomic Energy Agency (IAEA) and Nobel Prize winner
- Ahmed Zewail, scientist and Nobel Prize winner
- Ahmed Ezz, Egyptian politician and business tycoon
- Naseer Shamma, Arab Iraqi musician and oud player
- Gamal El-Ghitani, author and magazine editor
- Alaa Al Aswany, author and founder of the political movement Kefaya
- Yusuf Al-Qaradawi, Muslim scholar and head of the International Union for Muslim Scholars
- Amr Khaled, Islamic activist and founder of life makers and right start foundation
- Omar Khairat, musician
- Talaat Sadat, former Egyptian politician and current political prisoner.
- Ayman Nour, politician; chairman of the El Ghad party.
- George W. Bush, U.S. president; during the ten-minute interview on May 13, 2008, they discussed Egyptian-American relations and the issues of Palestine and Iran.
- Wael Ghonim, Google marketing executive and one of the organizers of the Jan25 movement in early 2011; an emotional interview after he had just been released from an 11-day secret detention; the dead were mourned and the movement given new life by the broadcast, which "undercut two weeks of relentless state propaganda" according to a report
