= Rotana Drama =

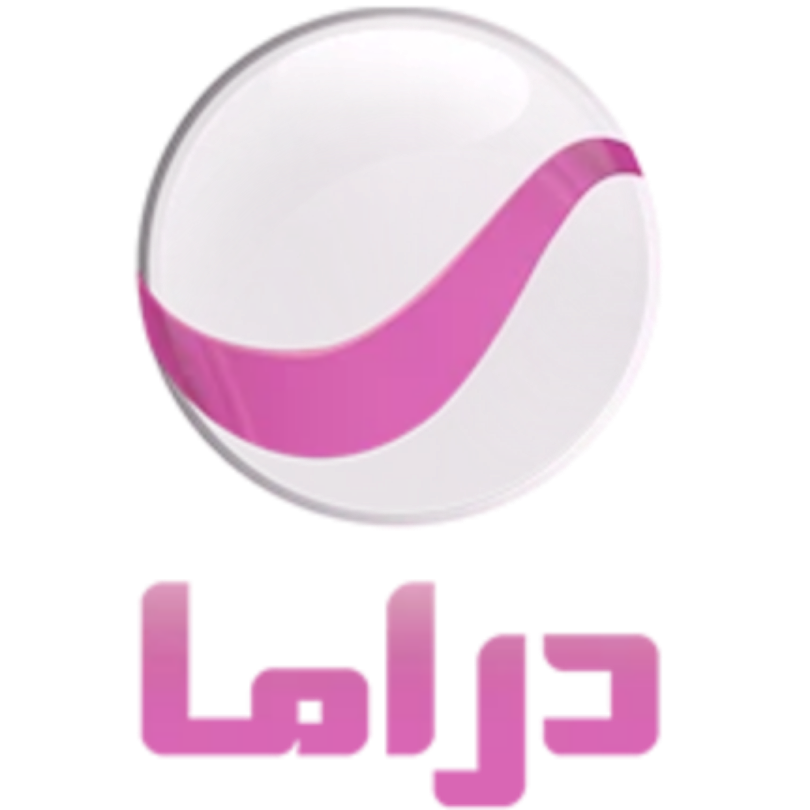
- Country: Kingdom of Saudi Arabia
- Network: Rotana (television)
- Headquarters: Dubai, United Arab Emirates

Ownership
- Owner: Rotana Group

History
- Launched: 2017

Rotana Drama (Arabic: روتانا دراما) is an Egyptian free-to-air satellite TV general entertainment unencrypted channel owned by the Rotana Group. It was launched in May 2011, a few months after the Egyptian uprising in January. The channel is known for its general entertainment programming and has gained attention for featuring various shows. The channel received international coverage after broadcasting a birthday party that was perceived as a marriage of two men in Egypt, where same-sex relationships are not technically illegal but are nevertheless punishable in practice.

In 2017, the channel was renamed Rotana Drama and turned to broadcasting Arab and Turkish dramas.
