= Yosri Fouda =

Egyptian investigative reporter

- Born: El Behira, Egypt
- Occupations: Talk show host and journalist
- Known for: Sirri lil-Ghaya (Top Secret) 1998–2009; Akhir Kalam (Final Word) 2010–2014; Al-Solta Al-Khamsa (Fifth Estate) 2016–2018

Yosri Fouda (Arabic: يسري فودة Yusrī Fūdah, IPA: [ˈjosɾi ˈfuːdæ]) is an Egyptian investigative reporter, author, and television host. He established Al Jazeera's office in London and was one of the star figures in the channel until he resigned in 2009. Fouda also worked as a television host at the Cairo-based ONTV Egyptian Channel. He co‑authored Masterminds of Terror: The Truth Behind the Most Devastating Attack The World Has Ever Seen, published in 2003 by Arcade Publishing.

== Early life and education ==
Fouda was born in Manshyet Ganzour in Tanta, El Gharbia. He got his bachelor's degree in Mass Communication at Cairo University and was appointed as an Assistant lecturer after his graduation. He pursued his master's degree at the American University in Cairo and graduated in 1992. Shortly after his graduation he got a Diploma in TV production from the Netherlands.

In 1993, Fouda was granted a scholarship from the British Council to pursue his PhD in documentary at University of Strathclyde and University of Glasgow. His studies were interrupted after he was approached by the BBC, who were looking for reporters with fluency in Arabic language.

== Career ==
=== BBC, Associated Press and ANN ===
Fouda's short lived BBC career spanned between 1994 and 1996. He took part in establishing the BBC Arabic service in 1994, and later served as a roving reporter alongside veteran journalist Martin Bell. He covered the Bosnian independence war, and other important events in the Middle East and Africa. After only two years the services of the Arabic BBC subsidiary were suspended due to political reasons and Fouda joined the Associated Press Television News. He took part in establishing the Middle East desk at the news agency, as well as, setting up the London-based Arab News Network (ANN).

=== Al Jazeera ===
In 1996, he joined the newly formed Al Jazeera as a UK and Western Europe correspondent. A year later he helped in securing an independent production office for Al Jazeera, and established their office in London. He was later appointed as the bureau chief of the London Al Jazeera office. Fouda started his widely popular monthly program Top Secret (Arabic: سري للغاية, Sirrī lil-Ġāyah) in 1998.

==== Sirri lil-Ghaya and Al Qaeda ====
His program was greatly received by critiques and viewers in the Arab world and won the second place at the 1998 Cairo Radio and Production Festival. In April 2002, Fouda interviewed Khalid Sheikh Mohammed, who admitted his involvement, along with Ramzi bin al-Shibh, in the September 11 attacks. Fouda does not consider his interview with the 9/11 orchestrators as a turning point in his career; instead he believes it introduced him to an international audience.

It has been suggested that Fouda gave away the hideaway location of bin al‑Shibh to Aljazeera's chairman Hamad bin Thamer Al Thani, a cousin of the Emir of Qatar, and that CIA director George Tenet received the location tip-off from the Emir, resulting in bin al‑Shibh's capture.

In 2006, Fouda, in charge of Aljazeera's London bureau, broke the story on the "martyrdom video" by "9/11 hijackers" Mohamed Atta and Ziad Jarrah.

Fouda resigned from Aljazeera in 2009, almost two years before the 2011 Egyptian revolution that toppled former president Hosni Mubarak. His resignation was driven by his disagreement with the inter-politics of the news agency, along with his feeling that an important event will soon take place in Egypt. Soon after his resignation, Fouda joined ONTV to host a talk show Last Words (اخر كلام).

=== ONTV ===
Fouda joined the politically independent Egyptian channel in 2010. Although he received numerous "tempting" offers from Aljazeera rivals, Fouda chose to return to Egypt. ONTV was still a new channel with a small budget, but he believed in the channels administration and founder Naguib Sawiris - a renowned Egyptian businessman.

==== 2011 Egyptian revolution ====
Fouda supported the revolution from day one, and offered an uninterrupted coverage of the Tahrir Square protests. Although he did not join the protests in Tahrir, he believed that his role should be in reporting and broadcasting the events as they unfold. His show gained massive popularity in Egypt during and after the revolution, and was at the top of TV show ratings. Fouda had interesting thoughts about the post-revolution Egypt, where he stated in an interview with Stephen Sackur that very little had changed in Egypt since the revolution, and that the ex-regime is still around and it should be preserved.

==== Suspending his talk show ====
His show constantly criticized Egypt's former military rulers and in October 2011, Fouda suspended his show in protest of what he called the "efforts by the country's military rulers to stifle free expression". He said "This is my way of self-censorship, either to say the truth or to be silent". The show went off air for three weeks and was resumed on November 13, 2011. At the start of his episode Fouda stressed that he stopped his program for three weeks to "prove a stance", and that his allegiance is always to "right and truth". On May 17 Fouda stated on his Twitter account that he will end the show in six weeks, but he then decided to continue for another year. The show was suspended again in late June 2012. He did not offer a clear explanation of the reasons and chose to briefly tweet “I’ve stopped my show because I respect you, the details concern me alone. The only thing that matters for the viewer is my work”. The show resumed in September 2012.

==== Leaving Deutsche Welle ====
In September 2018, Fouda parted ways with German broadcaster Deutsche Welle in controversial circumstances that are now the subject of legal action.

=== Books ===
Yosri Fouda authored and co-authored a collection of three books. In May 2003, Fouda alongside Nick Fielding published Masterminds of Terror: The Truth Behind the Most Devastating Terrorist Attack the World Has Ever Seen. Almost a year and a half later he published Serri lel-Ghaya meaning Highly confidential, a seven part sequel, which includes a collection of carefully selected investigations. The sequel offers a deeper insight about various events discussed earlier in his show, and grants the reader access to secret reports, testimonies and evidences. This collection was published by the World Book Publishing in Beirut, and is only available in Arabic.

Capture or Kill: The Pursuit of the 9/11 Masterminds and the Killing of Osama bin Laden (updated edition 2012, Arcade Publishing, ISBN 161145400X) is Fouda's second collaboration with the British investigative journalist Nick Fielding. In 2015, Fouda authored In Harm's Way: From the Stronghold of al-Qaida to the Heart of ISIL book, it was published by Dar El Shourok in Cairo and is available in Arabic language. In 2016, he authored another book called The last words: A testimony of hope in the Egyptian Revolution.

== Accident ==
On Sunday March 24, 2013 Fouda fractured his neck in a car accident near the Red Sea resort town of Hurghada. He was transported to the Gouna Hospital and his situation was reported to be stable.

== Quotes ==
I do not really believe there is such a thing as al-Qaida, the organization; there is al-Qaida, the mind-set. —Yosri Fouda

The experience of freedom is in one way like the experience of death. You can visit death but you can't come back from it. —Yosri Fouda

Who benefited the most from September 11?...Of course the Arab regimes, both America and Al Qaeda lost, the moderates lost, I lost and you lost, but our regimes in a blink of an eye gave themselves the permission to fight and abuse the opposition and enforce new laws to tighten their grip in the name of security, God, ethics, and in the name of what they call war on terror. —Yosri Fouda

But when you ask Egypt’s people to defend Egypt’s army from Egypt’s people, we must tell you stop, who is responsible for that?. —Yosri Fouda

== See also ==
- Television in Egypt
- ONTV (Egypt)
- OTV (Channel)
- Reem Maged
- Bassem Youssef
