= Rotana Mousica =

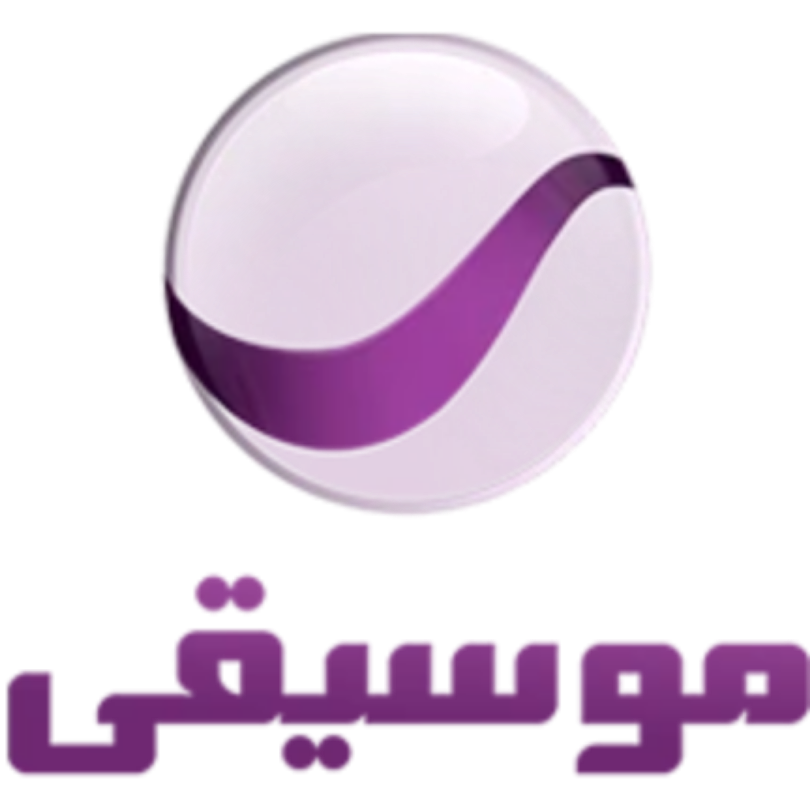
- Country: Saudi Arabia and Egypt
- Network: Rotana
- Headquarters: Dubai, United Arab Emirates

Ownership
- Owner: Rotana Group

History
- Launched: 21 April 2003
- Former names: POP Music

Rotana Mousica (Arabic: روتانا موسيقى) is a free-to-air satellite TV channel and part of the Rotana Group network. It was launched on 21 April 2003. It is a music channel in the Arab world showcasing the latest exclusive Khaliji, Egyptian and Arabic songs and rolling out the hits.

The format of Rotana Mousica also features programs covering all aspects of the music industry including news of the stars, entertainment events and concerts, and the performance of songs on the charts.

Mousica's slogan in Arabic كونوا على الموعد means "Don't miss it".
