= Lamis Elhadidy =

Egyptian television personality

- Born: Lamis Ali Mohamed Ali Elhadidy; 12 May 1963 (age 63); Cairo, Egypt
- Education: American University in Cairo
- Occupation: Presenter
- Spouse: Amr Adib (m. 1999; div. 2025)
- Children: Nour El Dien (b. 1999)

Lamis Elhadidy (Arabic: لميس الحديدي; born 12 May 1963), is an Egyptian TV presenter. She also worked for Al-Masry Al-Youm newspaper.

== Early life ==
Lamis Elhadidy was born in 1963 in Cairo, Egypt. Her father is Ali Elhadidy, a professor and dean in the Girls College of Ain Shams University, and her mother is Leila Buhairi, the granddaughter of a sheikh of Al-Azhar.

In 1983, Elhadidy enrolled at the American University in Cairo, gaining her first editing experience with the university newspaper, The Caravan, where she worked her way up from a reporter to editor-in-chief. In 1987, she graduated from AUC with a B.A. in Mass Communication with highest honors. Her graduate work was a documentary film, Child Labour, on child labour in factories and problems with the workshops, for which she received the Mustafa Amin Award in the same year. Later she continued her studies at AUC's Kamal Adham Center and received a master's degree in broadcast journalism with highest honors in 1991.

== Career ==
In 1987, Elhadidy started working as a desk producer for American TV network NBC in its Cairo bureau. She moved on to the New York Times Cairo office in 1989, writing articles as a stringer for over three years. During that time, she started writing in Arabic in Sabah El Kheir Ya Misr.

In 1991, she established together with Emad El-Din Adeeb a first Egyptian business newspaper called Al Alam Al Youm, where she worked as chief correspondent. Since 2005, she became the chief executive officer of its weekly edition.

In 1994, Elhadidy started her career on television as a correspondent of Arabic network MBC between Dubai and Cairo, then she joined TV channel Al Jazeera in 1999, where she worked as its Cairo business correspondent. She spent a semester to study business telecommunication at Tufts University in Boston before joining CNBC Arabiya in 2003. She served as the Cairo bureau chief of CNBC Arabiya up to 2005, when she started working as the senior business correspondent of TV channel Al Arabiya in Cairo until 2009. She was chosen by the nominating committee chaired by Queen Rania of Jordan to become one of the World Economic Forum's Young Global Leaders in 2006.

In 2005, when the first multi-candidate presidential election was held in Egypt, she ran media operations for the re-election campaign of the then President, Hosni Mubarak, at the new National Democratic Party headquarters in Heliopolis. The Al Alam Al Youm newspaper, where she worked as the managing editor at that time, was also engaged in providing favourable coverage to Mubarak's campaign promises.

Elhadidy debuted as television presenter, hosting a program, Etkalem, which was broadcast each Monday on national Channel 1 from 2005 to 2009. Subsequently, she became the presenter of various TV programs on state and private channels, such as Manea wa Mamnoua in 2007, Al-Ikhteyar Al-Saab in 2008, and Feesh wa Tashbeeh in 2009. On 1 March 2010, she started to host her most popular 3 days a week show, Men Qalb Masr, on Nile Life Channel. In the same year, she was named Best TV Anchor in two mass polls conducted by the newspapers, Al-Ahram and Al-Masry Al-Youm, for her TV programs.

During the 2011 protests in Tahrir Square, she refused to appear on the state-owned Nile Life channel for spreading false information up until Mubarak stepped down. She was criticized and assaulted for her strong anti-Islamist views along with her ties to the former regime, and eventually lost her show Men Qalb Masr on Nile Life in March 2011, as a result of the Muslim Brotherhood coming to power. She argued to the accusations of her participation in the Mubarak's 2005 election campaign by analogy to the similar practice in the United States, where mass media also involved in the elections, but no one accuses them of bias in favor of the system.

In July 2011, she moved on the satellite channel CBC, where she started to host Huna Al Asima and Half the Truth. The CBC had been accused of being anti-Islamist and politically biased since its inauguration in June 2011, and eventually been dubbed as the channel of feloul ("remnants"), because its presenters included Lamis Elhadidy and her brother-in-law Emad el-Din Adeeb, who made media contributions to Mubarak's 2005 presidential election campaign.

On 13 December 2011, she and other Egyptian media personalities received death-threat text messages to their mobile phones, which caused the Egyptian Organization for Human Rights to call for protection of the media specialists. In February 2012, she dedicated a whole episode of her show on CBC to the sexual assaults against women.

In 2015, Elhadidy was voted Best Female Presenter by Dear Guest magazine. She also was ranked as the 31st of the 100 most powerful Arab women in the world by Arabian Business, and the 10th of the 50 most powerful women in Africa by Jeune Afrique.

== Personal life ==
Since 1994 until December 2025 Elhadidy was married to an Egyptian TV presenter, Amr Adib, with whom she has a son, Nur Al-Din.

In December 2025 Lamis ElHadidi announced the divorce of TV presenter Amr Adib.

== Awards ==
| Year | Award | Awarded by |
|---|---|---|
| 2006 | Young Global Leader - Opinion & Media | World Economic Forum |
| 2010 | Special Award "Given by the DGF committee" for Dawam El Hal program | Dear Guest Festival |
| 2010 | Best Female Presenter | Al-Masry Al-Youm |
| 2010 | Best Female Presenter | Al-Ahram |
| 2012 | Best Female Presenter | Dear Guest Festival |
| 2015 | Best Female Presenter | Dear Guest Festival |
