= Rotana Media Group =

Saudi entertainment company

Rotana Group
- Type: Private
- Industry: Music; Television; Radio; Media services
- Founded: 1987
- Headquarters: Riyadh, Saudi Arabia, Egypt
- Area served: Arab world Sub-Saharan Africa; Asia; Europe
- Key people: Al Waleed bin Talal Al Saud, CEO
- Owner: Kingdom Holding Company
- Website: rotana.net/en

Rotana Media Group, commonly known as Rotana (Arabic: روتانا, romanized: Rōtānā), is a Saudi Arabian entertainment company. It is primarily owned by Saudi prince Al Waleed bin Talal through Kingdom Holding Company.

The media conglomerate includes a film production company (Rotana Studios), free to air television stations (Rotana TV), music channels (Rotana Radio), a record label (Rotana Music Group) and other businesses.

== History ==
Rotana was founded by Ibrahim Nagro and his brothers, with a 50% share to the Saudi business man Saleeh Kameel.

In 2003, Al Waleed increased his stake to 100 percent, after initially acquiring a 48 percent stake in 2002. He developed Rotana Music Channel as a 24-hour free-to-air service for Rotana artists. This was followed by Rotana 2, Rotana Clip, augmented with SMS, and Rotana 3 for classical Arab music, followed by a movie channel.

== Rotana Music Group ==
Rotana Records is a record label with over 100 signed artists.

== Rotana Radio ==
Rotana is a series of radio stations belonging to Rotana Group. Rotana Radio broadcasts in a number of Arab countries and plays almost exclusively music released by Rotana Records.

Stations currently broadcasting:

- Lebanon: Radio Rotana Delta
- Jordan: Radio Rotana Jordan
- Saudi Arabia: Radio Rotana FM Saudi Arabia
- Syria: Rotana Style FM
- Egypt: Radio Rotana FM Egypt

== Rotana channels ==
- Rotana Khalijiah (general entertainment)
- Rotana Drama (drama channel) – known as "Rotana Masriya" from 2011 until 2017
- LBC Sat (general entertainment) – previously known as "Al Fadaiyyah and Al Lubnaniyyah"
- Rotana Cinema KSA & Rotana Cinema Egypt (movies channel) – A movie channel established in 2005 that broadcasts exclusively films in Arabic
- Rotana Classic (classic movies) – A free to air satellite television specialty channel
- Rotana Aflam (films channel) – A free to air satellite television channel was launched in 2012.
- Rotana Clip (music clips channel)
- Rotana Mousica (music channel)
- Al Resalah (Islamic religious channel)
- Rotana Kids (children channel) – Launched on 1 April 2020.
- Rotana Comedy (comedy channel)
- Rotana News (news channel)
