= Mass media in Morocco =

Mass media in Morocco includes newspapers, radio, television, and Internet.

The first newspaper to be founded in Morocco was the Spanish-language El Eco de Tetuán in 1860. Such publications were not generally available in Moroccan cities until 1908. "Al Maghreb" was the first Arabic newspaper in the country and it was established in 1886.

The government of Morocco owns many key media outlets, including several major Moroccan radio and television channels, and the Moroccan press agency, Maghreb Agence Press. Moroccans have access to approximately 2,000 domestic and foreign publications. Many of the major dailies and weeklies can now be accessed on their own websites. Morocco has 27 AM radio stations, 25 FM radio stations, 6 shortwave stations, and 11 television stations including the channels of the public SNRT, the mixed-ownership (half public-half private) 2M TV which started out in 1989 as the first private terrestrial channel in Morocco. Later, it became a mixed ownership channel as 70% of its capital was bought by the government. and the privately owned Medi1 TV.

== History ==
=== Early history ===
The first newspaper to appear in Morocco was an English weekly called "Maghreb Al Aksa" in 1877. Such publications were not generally available in Moroccan cities until 1908. There was one newspaper before: "El Eco de Tetuán 1860" in Spanish. It was founded by Pedro Antonio de Alarcón, Spanish writer and journalist.

In 1883, Abraham Lévy-Cohen, a Jew from Tangier, established Le Réveil du Maroc, a French-language newspaper for the dissemination of the French language, culture, and political ideas among the Jews of Morocco.

"Al Maghrib" was the first Arabic newspaper in the country and it was established in 1886.

In 1906, Sheikh Muhammad Bin Abdul-Kabir Al-Kattani started publishing a short-lived Arabic-language newspaper called al-Taʿun (الطاعون), meaning "the plague." He used this newspaper to speak out in opposition to increasing Western influence – ostensibly the "plague" for which the newspaper was named – in Moroccan politics, economy, and society.

Under the French protectorate from 1920, French titles such as "L’Echo du Maroc" and "la Vigie Marocaine" started to appear. They were followed by the launch of a press group called "Mas" which issued "Farmhouse" and the daily newspapers "Le petit marocain" and "L'Écho du Maroc", although these titles continued to cater mainly to foreigners.

More recently, Moroccan nationalists such as Mohamed Al Ouazzani began to publish their own titles. In 1933 he founded "L'action du peuple", a weekly French language newspaper. Later, Abdekhalek Torres and Mohamed Bennouna issued two publications in Arabic in Tetouan "Al Salam" and "Al Hayat" respectively. These gave the nationalists a platform to advance their demands regarding independence from both France and Spain. More and more foreign press published in Morocco appeared. Morocco issued a press code on 15 November 1958.

=== Today ===
The government of Morocco owns many key media outlets, including Moroccan radio and television. Moroccans have access to approximately 2,000 domestic and foreign publications. The Moroccan press agency, Maghreb Arab Press, and one Arabic daily newspaper, Al-Anbaa, are official organs of the government. One additional Arabic daily newspaper, Assahra Al Maghrebia, and one French-language daily newspaper, Le Matin, are semi-official organs of the government.

Economic framework

In the past, the majority of Moroccan newspapers did not represent actual commercial ventures or profit-making corporations, since they were essentially the written public outlet of political parties. As such, they were owned by political interests and survived on contributions and government subsidies. In the last 10 years an influx of new capital has led to the creation of newspapers and periodicals that aspire to become commercially profitable. The new publications are still heavily dependent on the government's budgetary allocations and this reliance is inversely proportional to the professional autonomy of the younger generation of journalists.

== Digital media ==
In recent years, digital media has become a primary source of information for Moroccans, significantly impacting traditional print journalism. As of 2025, online news portals such as Hespress and social media platforms are the dominant channels for news consumption in the country. The sector is regulated by the National Press Council (CNP) and follows specific legal codes regarding online publishing.

== Press freedom ==
Opposition dailies have begun to explore social and political issues that have traditionally been considered out of bounds, though journalists continue to practice self-censorship. The media continue to exercise great caution when discussing government corruption, human rights and Morocco's policy toward Western Sahara. Radio Méditerranée Internationale (Medi-1), a joint French/Moroccan broadcaster, also practices self-censorship.

On December 20, 2006, Moroccan Prime Minister Driss Jettou banned the Arabophone weekly magazine Nichane. This action was taken in retaliation for publishing "provocative jokes" related to religion. The website was also shut down.

In a 2009 evaluation of the state of press freedom in Morocco, Reporters Without Borders found that real progress at the start of King Mohammed's reign had been followed by reverses and tension, especially from 2002 onward.

Print media seem to have the most editorial leeway, although just 1 per cent of the population buys newspapers and magazines, with only a few newspapers such as Tel Quel and Le Journal Hebdomadaire being more independent.

The number of daily and weekly newspapers has grown dramatically since 1999 and several new radio and TV stations were given licenses when state control of broadcasting began to be relaxed in May 2006, offering Moroccans some diversity in this sector for the first time. Despite the impartiality of the High Council for Broadcasting (CSCA), there was widespread disappointment that no new TV stations and only four new radio stations (either regional or specialist ones) were awarded licences in a second wave in February of this year. There had been 23 applicants.

Although Morocco today tolerates more media criticism and more editorial freedom, the media still faces obstacles such as archaic laws and arbitrary reactions. Policemen often assault reporters and photographers and confiscate their equipment. Twenty policemen raided the Arabic-language weekly Al Ayam on 10 February 2009 just because of a photo of a member of the royal family which it had requested permission to publish.

Journalists can still be jailed under the Moroccan press code. Since 1999, journalists have been sentenced to a combined total of nearly 25 years in prison. The media were angered by the code's latest revision, in May 2002, because the possibility of prison sentences was maintained even if the maximum terms were cut significantly (for example, from 20 to five years for attacks on the king's honor). Article 41 extended the defamation law's applicability to Islam and Morocco's territorial integrity, while the courts, in addition to the executive, were given the power to suspend or close newspapers.

=== Ranking ===
With a score of 43.98, in 2019, Morocco ranked 135th out of the 180 countries assessed in the 2019 Worldwide press freedom index from Reporters Without Borders. Scores range from 6 to 85, with smaller scores corresponding to greater freedom of press.

Year	Rank	Score
2002	089	29.00
2003	131	39.67
2004	126	43.00
2005	119	36.17
2006	097	24.83
2007	106	33.25
2008	122	32.25
2009	127	41.00
2010	135	47.40
2011-12	138	63.29
2013	136	39.04
2014	136	39.72
2015	130	39.19
2016	131	42.64
2017	133	42.42
2018	135	43.13
2019	135	43.98

== Media companies ==
=== Telecommunications ===
- Inwi
- Maroc Telecom
- Orange Morocco
- Mobisud
- Wana (Telecommunications)

=== Television ===
The public broadcaster SNRT currently runs nine television channels:

- Al Aoula (SNRT 1)
  - Al Aoula Europe
  - Al Aoula Middle East
  - Laayoune TV
- Arryadia (SNRT 3)
  - Arryadia 2
- Arrabia (SNRT 4)
- Al Maghribia (SNRT 5)
- Assadissa (SNRT 6)
- Aflam TV (SNRT 7)
- Tamazight TV (SNRT 8)

State-owned channels:

- 2M TV
- Medi 1 TV

The audiovisual sector is regulated by the High Authority for Audiovisual Communication (Morocco) (HACA), which ensures pluralism and ethics in broadcasting. All of the above channels can be viewed nationwide, on analog terrestrial networks. Moroccans who have digital terrestrial television, are eligible to view many Arabic and French private channels, including Nickelodeon, MTV, MBC or M6, which are freely accessible.

=== Radio ===
- Casa FM
- Chada FM
- Hit Radio
- Medi 1
- Medina FM Radio
- MFM Radio
- Radio Aswat
- Radio Atlantic
- Radio Plus (Morocco)
- SNRT Arabic
- SNRT Chaine inter
- SNRT coranique
- Radio 2M
- Atlantic Radio
- U Radio

== See also ==
- List of magazines in Morocco
- List of newspapers in Morocco
- Internet censorship in Morocco
- Telephone numbers in Morocco
- Television in Morocco
- Cinema of Morocco

== Bibliography ==
- Toyin Falola; Daniel Jean-Jacques, eds. (2015). "Morocco: Media". Africa: an Encyclopedia of Culture and Society. ABC-CLIO. ISBN 978-1-59884-666-9.
- "Morocco", Freedom of the Press, USA: Freedom House, 2016, OCLC 57509361
