= List of Arabic-language television channels =

The list is a list of television channels and stations in the Arab World, as well as Arab-based Western television channels. The majority, if not all, of these channels, are chiefly in Arabic.

== Africa ==
=== Algeria ===
==== Current channels ====
- Public Establishment of Television (EPTV)
  - TV1
  - TV2 (Canal Algérie)
  - TV3
  - TV4
  - TV5
  - TV6
  - TV7
  - TV8
  - TV9
- Echorouk Group
  - Echorouk TV
  - Echorouk News
- B4U Network (Algeria)
  - B4U Eldjazairia
  - B4U Eldjazairia 2
- AL24 News
- Beur TV
- El Bilad TV
- El Hayat TV
- El Heddaf TV
- Ennahar TV
- Samira TV

==== Former channels ====
- Atlas TV
- El Djazairia One

=== Chad ===
- Télé Tchad

=== Djibouti ===
- Radio Television of Djibouti

=== Egypt ===
- DMC (TV)
- Al Masriya
- Dream TV
- Dream 1 TV
- Dream 2 TV
- El Mehwar
- El Mehwar 2
- El Mehwar Drama
- CBC
- CBC Two
- CBC Drama
- CBC + 2
- CBC Sofra
- Extra News
- Extra Live
- Al Hayat 1
- Al Hayat 2
- Al Hayat 3
- Al Hayat Drama
- Al Hayat Cinema
- Al Hayat Musalsalat
- Al Hayat Sports
- Al Hayat Al Ann
- Al Hayat We Alnas
- Al Nahar TV
- Al Nahar + 2
- Al Nahar Noor
- Al Nahar Al Youm
- MBC Masr
- Al Nahar Sports
- Al Nahar Drama
- Al Nahar Cinema
- ART Aflam 1
- ART Aflam 2
- ART Hekayat 1
- ART Hekayat 2
- ART Cinema
- ART Hekayat Kaman
- ART America
- ART Movies
- ART Variety
- ART Cable
- ART Music Radio
- ART Tarab
- ART Latino
- ART Variety Australia
- ART Cima
- Nickelodeon
- Nick Jr.
- Nicktoons
- Nile Drama
- Nile Drama 2
- Nile Cinema
- Nile Comedy
- Nile Culture
- Nile News
- Nile Educational
- Nile Family
- Nile Life
- Nile Sport
- Cairo Cinema
- Cairo Cinema 2
- Cairo Drama
- Cairo Comedy
- Cairo Musalsalat
- Cairo Film
- Cairo Fight
- Cairo Zaman
- Panorama Film
- Panorama Action
- Panorama Drama
- Panorama Drama 2
- Panorama Comedy
- Star Cinema 1
- Star Cinema 2
- Star Cinema 3
- Star Aflam
- Al Aan TV
- El Mehwar Channel
- Masr Alhayah
- Iqraa EGY
- Sama Cinema
- Nile TV
- Koky Kids
- Cima
- DMC
- DMC Drama
- TEN TV
- ON E
- ON Sport
- ON Sport 2
- ON Drama
- Al Yawm
- Al Safawa
- ERTU 1
- ERTU 2
- BOM Classic
- BOM Khalegiah
- BOM Cinema
- BOM Drama
- BOM Aflam
- BOM Hekayat
- ElShasha Al yum
- Aghapy TV
- MBC
- MBC 2
- MBC 3
- MBC 4
- MBC Action
- MBC Bollywood
- MBC Drama
- MBC FM
- MBC Masr 2
- MBC Max
- MBC Plus Drama
- Hi TV
- Al Mahaba TV
- Al Nada TV
- Time Cinema
- Time Cinema 2
- Time Comedy
- Time Comedy 2
- Time Drama
- Time Drama 2
- Time Quran
- Time Sport
- Time Taxi
- Time Film
- Panorama Drama
- Panorama Drama 2
- Panorama Film
- Panorama Food
- Rotana Cinema
- Rotana Aflam
- Rotana Khalaijia
- Rotana Drama
- Rotana Clip
- Rotana Classic
- Rotana Mousica
- Rotana Kids
- Rotana Comedy
- Mekameleen TV
- Misr El Balad
- Misr El Balad 2
- Apple Aflam
- Apple Cinema
- Apple Comedy
- Apple Hekayat
- Apple Mosalsalat
- Apple Drama
- Apple Today
- etc
- Alfa Cinema 1
- Alfa Cinema 2
- Alfa Series HD
- Alfa Series HD +2
- Alfa Al Yawm
- Alfa Al Safwa
- Fann TV
- Cinema Pro
- Family Drama
- Darbaka Aflam
- Darbaka Cinema
- Darbaka Drama
- Darbaka Action
- El Tohamy
- Moga Comedy TV
- Top Movies
- BBC Arabic
- B4U Aflam
- OrPit Plus Drama
- OrPit Plus Hekayat
- OrPit Plus Al Youm
- OrPit Plus Cinema
- OrPit Plus Movies
- Sada El Balad
- Sada El Balad 2
- Sada El Balad Drama
- Al Ghad Al Araby
- Free TV
- Mazzika
- Mazazikh
- Maspero Zaman
- Daawah TV
- Nogoum FM TV
- Tok Tok Cima
- Tok Tok Cinema
- Tok Tok Aflam
- Tok Tok Drama
- Tok Tok Mosalslat
- Tok Tok Classic
- Set El Bet
- Abu Dhabi Drama
- Abu Dhabi Sport
- Abu Dhabi TV
- Bein Drama
- Bein Movies
- OSN Ya Hala
- OSNtv Ya Hala Cinema
- OSNtv Ya Hala Bill Arabi
- OSNtv News
- OSNtv Movies
- Ahrar 25
- Belody Aflam
- Misr Al Aan TV
- Nile News
- Al Quran Al Karim
- Aljazeera
- Aljazeera Mubasher
- Sat 7 Arabic
- Sat 7 Kids
- Fox Cinema
- Fox Classic
- Al Shasha TV
- Al Shasha Food
- Al Shasha Drama
- Al Shasha Cinema
- Al Shasha Hekayat
- Al Shasha Classic
- Al Shasha Comedy
- Al Shasha Mosalslata
- Al Shasha Film
- El Sharq
- El Sharq El Awast
- Mix Hollywood
- Mix bel Araby
- Showtime Comedy
- Showtime Cinema
- Showtime Aflam
- Showtime Drama
- Showtime Mosalslat
- Showtime Film
- Shababik Mosalslat
- Shababik Drama
- Shababik Cinema
- Shababik Hekayat
- Shababik Aflam
- Shababik Classic
- M Drama
- M Cinema
- M Aflam
- M Classic
- Home Aflam
- Home Cinema
- Home Drama
- Masr Cinema
- Masr Aflam
- Masr Drama
- Click Aflam
- Click Cinema
- Van Drama
- Van Hekayat
- Van Mosalsalat
- Cartoon Network Arabic
- Taxi TV
- ON E
- Zee Aflam
- Zee Alwan
- Zee Masr
- Time Sports
- Watan TV
- Watch It (streaming service)
- Azhari TV
- IUC TV
- Al Madeeh
- Oscar TV
- Fox Masr
- Zilzal Aflam
- Zilzal Al Youm
- Zilzal Cinema
- Zilzal Classic
- Zilzal Drama
- Zilzal Mosalsalat
- Al Deeb Drama
- Al Deeb Aflam

=== Eritrea ===
- Eri-TV

=== Ethiopia ===
- ETV Ethiopia

=== Libya ===
- 218TV

- Libyan Business TV
- Aljamahiriya TV

=== Mauritania ===
- TV de Mauritanie

=== Morocco ===
- Al Aoula
- 2M
- Medi 1 TV
- Arryadia
- Athaqafia
- Al Maghribia
- Assadissa
- Aflam TV
- Télé Maroc
- MBC 5

=== Somalia ===
- Universal TV
- SBC TV
- Shabelle TV
- Puntland TV and Radio

=== South Africa ===
- Deen TV

=== South Sudan ===
- South Sudan Television
- Ebony TV

=== Sudan ===
- Sudan TV
- Blue Nile
- Khartoum
- Omdurman
- Sudan 24
- Al Nielsen
- Sudan Music
- Al Shamalia TV

=== Tunisia ===
- Tunisia Nat 1
- Tunisia Nat 2
- Attesiaa TV
- El Hiwar El Tounousi
- Tunisna
- Carthage +
- Al Janoubia TV
- Al Insan TV
- Nessma TV
- Zaytouna TV
- Hannibal TV
- Telvza TV

== Europe ==
=== France ===
- France 24 Arabic
- TV5MONDE Maghreb-Orient (subtitles only)

=== United Kingdom ===
- BBC Arabic
- BBC First (subtitles only)
- MTA 3
- Al-Hiwar

== Asia ==
=== Bahrain ===
- Bahrain TV

=== China ===
- CGTN Arabic

=== Iran ===
- Al-Alam News Network
- Al-Kawthar TV
- iFilm Arabic

=== Iraq ===
- Rudaw Media Network
- NRT News
- K24

=== Israel ===
- KAN 33
- i24news Arabic

==== Former channels ====
- Channel 33

=== Jordan ===
- Roya TV
- Roya Drama
- Roya Comedy
- Roya News
- Roya Kids
- Roya Sports
- Roya Kitchen
- Amman TV
- Al-Mamlaka TV
- M6 Jordan
- W9 Jordan
- 6ter Jordan
- M6 Music Jordan
- ON Jordan
- ON Food
- ON Sport Jordan
- ON Sport 2 Jordan
- Ordoni TV
- Jordan Channel 1
- Jordan Channel 2
- Jordan Channel 3
- Jordan Channel 4
- Jordan Channel 5
- Al Farah TV
- Amman Channel
- Irbid Channel
- Zarqa Channel
- Ajloun Channel
- Al Karak Channel
- Tafilah Channel
- Mafraq Channel
- Aqaba Channel
- Al Salt Channel
- Al-Faisaly TV
- Al-Wehdat TV
- Al Dar Jordan
- Al Ghad TV
- Al Ghad Sports
- Norman TV
- Amman Today TV

=== Kuwait ===
Kuwait Television

KTV2

=== Lebanon ===
Current Channels:

- Télé Liban
- Télé Lumière
- MTV Lebanon
- One
- OTV
- LDC
- LBC International
- LBC Europe
- LBC Sat
- LBC America
- LBC Drama
- Future TV
- Future TV USA
- Nagham
- Arab Woman TV
- NBN
- ANB
- Aghani TV
- Hawacom
- Al Mayadeen
- Al Manar
- Al Jadeed

Former Channels:

- Kilikia
- ICN
- Mashrek
- Antenne Plus
- CVN
- C33
- Alissar
- Middle east television (METV)
- Television of arab lebanon (TLA)
- Future News
- Sigma 90
- Beirut television
- Tripoli tv
- Zahle Voice television
- Lebanese network
- Star Academy 7/24

=== Palestine ===
- Al-Aqsa TV
- Palestinian Satellite Channel

=== Saudi Arabia ===
- OSNtv (Pay Television)
- Rotana Channels
- MBC
- MBC 2
- MBC 3
- MBC 4
- MBC Action
- MBC Bollywood
- MBC Drama
- MBC Masr 2
- MBC Max
- SBC
- Al Arabiya
- Al Arabiya Business
- Al Hadath
- Iqraa
- Al Saudiya
- Al Ekhbariya
- KSA Sport
- Quran TV
- Sunnah TV
- Al Majd TV
- stc tv (Pay Television)
- Nickelodeon Arabia
- Cartoon Network Arabic
- Disney Channel Arabia

=== Syria ===
- Syria TV (On DVB-T System)
- Syria Drama
- Nour Al Sham
- Sakaker 24 (On DVB-T System)
- Drama 24 (On DVB-T System)
- Sports TV (On DVB-T System)
- Syria TV SD
- Syria TV HD
- Lana TV
- Lana TV HD
- Lana Plus TV
- Orient News
- Halab Today TV
- PubliTools
- Sama TV
- Al khabar TV
- Massaya TV
- Suroyo TV

=== Qatar ===
- Qatar TV
- Qatar TV HD
- Al Jazeera
- Al Jazeera Mubasher
- Al Jazeera Documentary
- Al Araby TV
- Al Araby TV HD
- Al Araby 2
- Al Rayyan
- Al Rayyan HD
- Al Rayyan Al Qadim HD
- Qatar Today
- B4U Music Qatar
- beIN SPORTS
- beIN SPORTS News
- beIN SPORTS 1
- beIN SPORTS 2
- beIN SPORTS 3
- beIN SPORTS 4
- beIN SPORTS 5
- beIN SPORTS 6
- beIN SPORTS 7
- beIN SPORTS PREMIUM 1
- beIN SPORTS PREMIUM 2
- beIN SPORTS PREMIUM 3
- beIN SPORTS XTRA 1
- beIN SPORTS XTRA 2
- beIN SPORTS AFC
- beIN SPORTS AFC 1
- beIN SPORTS AFC 2
- beIN SPORTS AFC 3
- beIN SPORTS AFC 4
- beIN SPORTS MAX 1
- beIN SPORTS MAX 2
- beIN SPORTS MAX 3
- beIN SPORTS MAX 4
- beIN SPORTS MAX 5
- beIN SPORTS MAX 6
- beIN 4K
- Alkass one
- Alkass two
- Alkass three
- Alkass four
- Alkass five
- Alkass six
- Alkass seven
- Alkass eight

=== Turkey ===
- TRT Arabi

=== United Arab Emirates ===
- Abu Dhabi TV
- Drama (MENA TV channel)
- Quest Arabiya
- Sky News Arabia
- Dubai TV
- Zee Alwan
- Zee Aflam
- MBC 2 (Middle East and North Africa)
- MBC 3
- MBC 4
- MBC Action
- MBC Drama (Middle East and North Africa)
- MBC Max
- MBC Bollywood
- FOX
- Spacetoon
- Wanasah
- Dubai Sport 1
- Dubai Sport 2
- Dubai One
- Al Aan TV
- Hala TV

=== Yemen ===
- Yemen TV
