= Television in Morocco =

Morocco has nine domestic free-to-air channels, all directly or indirectly owned by the public national broadcaster SNRT. TVM was the only channel available in Morocco until the establishment of 2M in 1989 as a private terrestrial channel; however, it later became a mixed ownership channel as 70% of its capital was bought by the government. Al Aoula and 2M are by far two most watched channels in Morocco, as cited by 84% of TV viewers. Medi 1 TV (formerly Medi 1 Sat) was founded as a privately owned channel, although 50% of its shares were owned by companies from the public sector. The other seven channels are all government-owned. SNRT gradually nationalized the two remaining non-public channels in the 2020s.

Terrestrial television viewing was estimated at 20% of total television households in 2011. IPTV is offered by Maroc Telecom. Digital terrestrial television is gradually spreading, with 41 national and foreign channels. SNRT aimed to complete digital switchover by 2015.

beIN SPORTS is the most popular pay-TV bouquet in Morocco, accounting for around 65% of the local pay-TV market.

== History ==
Morocco was a pioneer in television in the Arab world. In the 1950s, the country had a first experience undertaken by a French company, known as TELMA, who saw in the European community in Morocco a potential audience. In 1951, the authorization of broadcasting was ceded to TELMA, which did not begin to transmit until February 1954. The experiment was short-lived and the station ceased broadcasts soon after covering the return of Mohammed V to Morocco on 16 November 1955. The cancellation was over political reasons put forward by the Moroccan nationalist movement, which ultimately deprived the company of advertising resources, local advertisers gradually withdrawing their contracts for fear of possible reprisals, as reported in an interview with Abdellah Chakroun, former Director of Moroccan Television, author of the book "Reflections on the Audiovisual and Theater".

According to the technical guide "World Radio Television Handbook" of the time 2, TELMA broadcast in the standard 819 French lines (Standard E) format from its studios in the Ain Chock district of Casablanca. It had two transmitters, one in Casablanca on the F12 channel, the other in Rabat on the F8 channel (both connected by radio link) and planned to open two more in 1955 in Fes and Meknes. The main shareholders, the management and technical staff were mainly French, notably Jean Luc in the Programs Department, who had previously held this position on RTF Television. The programs were mainly of French origin, with magazines and varieties "kinescopés" (recorded on film), serials and films.

Abdellah Chakroun noted that in 1960, the Moroccan government bought TELMA for a symbolic sum of 100 million francs, and that as director he then called on Italian public television RAI to help him set up his own public channel, which was set up at Mohammed V Theater in Rabat. The technical standard adopted was the 625 "European" lines (Standard B) with specific channels in Morocco (channels M4 to M10 on band III). Like TELMA, it initially had only two transmitters, in Rabat (channel M10) and Casablanca (channel M7).

TVM launched on the day of the celebration of the first year of Hassan II's reign on March 3, 1962. Colour (SECAM IIIb process) was introduced in 1972. Its status has moved successively from the regime of legal capacity and financial autonomy to that of the public institution, and then to its integration into the central administration of the Ministry of Communication, with a subsidiary budget.

In terms of resources, the state-owned broadcaster of Morocco ensures the balance of its budget through a government grant, in addition to a contribution-based contribution indexed to the energy consumption of households, the surplus of revenues of the Autonomous Advertising Service (SAP), as well as miscellaneous and accidental revenues resulting from the income from its services.

== List of channels ==
- Al Aoula: SD and HD
- 2M TV: SD and HD
- Arryadia: SD and HD
- Athaqafia: SD and HD
- Al Maghribia: SD and HD
- Assadissa: SD and HD
- Aflam TV (TNT only): SD and HD
- Tamazight TV: SD and HD
- Medi 1 TV (Afrique / Arabic / Maghreb): SD and HD
- Laayoune TV: SD and HD
- Télé Maroc: SD
- Chada TV: SD
- Wissam TV: SD
- Al Ons TV: HQ

== Most viewed channels ==
Position	Channel	Share of total viewing (%)
1	Al Aoula	26.1
2	2M TV	26.0
3	Télé Maroc	5.6
4	Medi 1 TV	5.0
5	beIN Sports	3.5
6	Al Maghribia	3.3
7	Aflam TV	3.0
8	Athaqafia	2.5
9	Arryadia	1.9
10	Al Jazeera	1.4

== See also ==
- Al Aoula
- 2M TV
