= List of television channels in Morocco =

This is a list of television channels available in Morocco, including public broadcasters, regional channels, and private networks distributed via terrestrial, satellite, and cable platforms.

== List of channels ==
- Al Aoula
- Al Aoula HD
- 2M TV
- Arryadia
- Arryadia Live HD
- Attakafia
- Attakafia HD
- Al Maghribia
- Al Maghribia HD
- Assadissa HD
- Aflam TV (TNT Only)
- Tamazight TV
- Tamazight HD
- Laayoune TV
- Medi1 TV
- Medi1 TV HD
- Télé Maroc
- Chada TV
- MBC 5
- MBC 5 HD
