= Information technology in Morocco =

The information technology sector in Morocco has expanded significantly since the 2000s. The country has developed one of the largest telecommunications and internet markets in North Africa, supported by sustained growth in mobile broadband, fibre-optic access and digital services. By the end of 2024, Morocco had 40.22 million internet subscriptions, corresponding to a subscription penetration rate of 109.21%.

Internet use has also continued to rise. Morocco had 35.5 million internet users at the end of 2025, equivalent to an internet penetration rate of 92.2% of the total population.

The sector is shaped by a combination of public policy and private sector development. It is overseen by public institutions, notably the Ministry of Digital Transition and Administrative Reform, as well as the Digital Development Agency (ADD), which is responsible for implementing national digital strategies and supporting the development of the digital economy.

In September 2024, Morocco launched the national strategy Morocco Digital 2030, accompanied by a 2024–2030 programme contract for the development of the offshoring sector and a second phase of the national plan for high- and very-high-speed broadband deployment.

Morocco has also positioned itself as a regional hub for digital and offshoring services. In 2025, the United States International Trade Administration described the country’s digital economy as being driven by expanding 5G coverage and growing demand for digital infrastructure and services.

== Telecommunications ==
The mobile telephony market in Morocco is served by three operators: Maroc Telecom (Itissalat Al-Maghrib), Orange Maroc (formerly Méditel), and Inwi. According to data published by the National Telecommunications Regulatory Agency (ANRT), the country had approximately 58.8 million mobile subscriptions in 2025, corresponding to a penetration rate of around 159%. The market shares were relatively balanced between the three operators, with Orange Maroc slightly ahead, followed by Inwi and Maroc Telecom.

The Moroccan mobile market is largely based on prepaid subscriptions, which represent the majority of active lines, although the postpaid segment has grown gradually in recent years. Growth has remained steady, supported by the expansion of mobile internet usage and competitive pricing between operators.

The fixed-line telephony segment is smaller but has continued to grow moderately. The number of fixed subscriptions reached around 3.1 million in 2025. Maroc Telecom remains the leading operator in this segment, followed by Orange Maroc and Inwi.

In recent years, the structure of the sector has evolved with the expansion of broadband services, particularly fibre-to-the-home (FTTH), as well as the deployment of 5G networks. These developments reflect a broader shift from traditional telephony towards data-driven services and digital infrastructure.

== Offshoring ==
Morocco's offshoring sector developed in the 2000s as part of broader policies aimed at expanding export-oriented services. In 2008, Gartner included Morocco in its list of the top 30 countries for offshore services, citing factors such as language skills and proximity to European markets.

The sector was promoted under the Plan Émergence framework and later through dedicated industrial and digital policies. Over time, its activities expanded beyond call centres to include business process outsourcing, information technology services and other back-office functions.

Offshoring remains part of Morocco's digital and industrial policy. In September 2024, the government launched the Morocco Digital 2030 strategy together with a 2024–2030 programme contract dedicated to the development of the offshoring sector. The strategy formed part of a broader effort to strengthen Morocco's position in digital services, outsourcing and related infrastructure.

== IT sector ==
The IT sector generated a turnover of MAD 7bn ($910,000m) in 2007, which represented an 11% increase compared to 2006. The number of Moroccan internet subscribers in 2007 amounted to 526,080, representing an increase of 31.6% compared to the previous year and a 100% increase compared to 2005. The national penetration for internet subscription remains low, even though it increased from 0.38% in 2004 to 1.72% in 2007. Yet over 90% of subscribers have a broadband ADSL connection, which is one of the highest ratios in the world. While the telecoms sector remains the big earner, with Dh33bn ($4.3bn), the IT and off shore industries should generate Dh21bn ($2.7bn) each by 2012. In addition, the number of employees should increase from 40,000 to 125,000. The government hopes that adding more local content to the internet will increase usage. There have also been efforts to add more computers to schools and universities. E-commerce is likely to take off in the next few years, especially as the use of credit cards is gaining more ground in Morocco. Although computer and internet use have made a great leap forward in the past five years, the IT market still finds itself in infancy and offers great potential for further development.

== Government policy ==
Government policy toward the information technology sector has evolved from earlier sectoral plans to broader digital transformation strategies. Earlier initiatives included M@roc 2006–2012, which sought to expand the combined contribution of telecommunications and information technology to the economy.

In the area of personal data protection, Morocco adopted Law No. 09-08 of 18 February 2009 on the protection of individuals with regard to the processing of personal data. The law created the National Commission for the Control of Personal Data Protection (CNDP), the country's data protection authority. Its mandate is to ensure that personal data processing complies with the legal framework and does not infringe privacy, freedoms or fundamental rights.

More recently, Morocco has framed digital development through new institutional and strategic tools. The sector is overseen by public bodies including the Ministry of Digital Transition and Administrative Reform and the Digital Development Agency (ADD), while telecommunications regulation is carried out by the National Telecommunications Regulatory Agency (ANRT). In September 2024, Morocco launched the national strategy Morocco Digital 2030, accompanied by a 2024–2030 programme contract for the development of the offshoring sector and a second phase of the national plan for high- and very-high-speed broadband deployment.

Government policy has also supported the development of technology parks and dedicated zones for outsourcing, business services and information technology activities.
