= List of Berber-language television channels =

This is a list of Berber-language television channels.

== Morocco ==
=== State ===
- Tamazight TV (Shilha, Central Tamazight, Riffian, Standard Moroccan Tamazight)
- 2M TV – partially in Shilha
- Arrabia – partially in Shilha, Central Tamazight, Riffian

== Algeria ==
=== State ===
- TV4 (Kabyle, Shawiya and other Algerian Berber languages)

=== Private ===
- Berbère Télévision (Kabyle) – based in France
- TQ5 TV (Kabyle) – based in Canada

== Niger ==
=== State ===
- Télé Sahel – partially in Tamajeq

== Spain ==
=== State ===
- Televisión Melilla – partially in Riffian

== See also ==
- Lists of television channels
- Media of Morocco
- Media of Algeria
