= .ma =

Internet country code top-level domain for Morocco

- Introduced: 26 November 1993; 32 years ago
- TLD type: Country code top-level domain
- Status: Active
- Registry: Agence Nationale de Réglementation de Télécommunications (ANRT)
- Sponsor: Agence Nationale de Réglementation de Télécommunications (ANRT)
- Intended use: Entities connected with Morocco
- Actual use: Popular in Morocco
- Registered domains: 140,995 (22 July 2026)
- Registration restrictions: Must be based in the country or have a legal representative
- Structure: Registrations are made directly at the second level or at third level beneath second-level categories
- Documents: Reglementation
- Dispute policies: Complaints and Claims
- DNSSEC: Yes
- IDN: Yes (Accented Latin only)
- Registry website: registre.ma

المغرب.
- TLD type: Internationalized country code top-level domain
- Status: Active
- Actual use: Only by ANRT itself as of Nov 2016

.ma is the Internet country code top-level domain (ccTLD) for Morocco administered and regulated by ANRT.

A local registrar with a local Moroccan company or a foreign company with a legal representative is needed to register a .ma or .co.ma domain name. Further restrictions are imposed on the registering of other second-level domains (such as .ac.ma or .gov.ma).

== History ==
In 1993, the Internet Assigned Numbers Authority (IANA) approved a request for delegation of the .ma ccTLD for administrative and technical contact to École Mohammadia d'ingénieurs.

Two years later, in 1995, the technical management of the .ma domain was taken over by Office national des postes et télécommunications (now Maroc Telecom), who remains the technical maintainer.

On 12 May 2006, IANA redesignated the administrative and technical contact for the domain, and made the Agence nationale de réglementation des télécommunications (ANRT) the only official registrar for the .ma ccTLD.

Starting from early 2015, the ANRT took official control of .ma and launched new automatic provisioning, followed by the activation and implementation of DNSSEC a year later.

== Second-level domains (ccSLDs) ==
.ma has second-level domains (or ccSLDs) available for registration, but some (like .gov.ma or .ac.ma) are restricted and unavailable for public use:

Second-level domain	Intended usage	Public Availability
Non-restricted
.co.ma	Commercial entities & businesses	Yes
.net.ma	Network providers & technology sectors	Yes
.org.ma	Organisations and Associations	Yes
Restricted
.ac.ma	Educational institutions & universities, requires approval	Limited
.gov.ma	Restricted to government agencies & institutions	No
.press.ma	Press and newsletters, requires approval from authorities	Limited

== Pricing ==
Base pricing (in Moroccan dirham) of .ma domains is set and determined by decision ANRT/DG/n° 12-14 and depends on the length of the renewal period, though registrar pricing differs from the base price:

Number of years	Domain registration/renewal tariff (exc. VAT)
1	100 MAD
2	190 MAD
3	270 MAD
4	340 MAD
5	400 MAD

== Second top-level domain ==
A second top-level domain will be used for Morocco intended for domain names in the local language using Arabic characters. The string المغرب. has been registered and approved for this purpose, and was delegated to Morocco in April 2011, but it is not yet active and second-level domains have not been granted.
