= Internet in Morocco =

The Internet in Morocco is among the more developed in the MENA region. The country code top-level domain (ccTLD) of Morocco is .ma.

== Access ==
According to the ITU, Morocco has 20,535,174 Internet users, or a 58.3% penetration rate as of June 2017. This includes 12 million Facebook users. Between 2013 and 2014, the Moroccan Internet population grew by 1 million. As of 2015, 94.1% of Moroccan netizens use mobile devices to access the Internet.

In June 2015, Meditel became the first operator in the country and in North Africa to deploy 4G, followed two days later by Inwi.

In July 2015, Maroc Telecom deployed their 4G network, few weeks after its competitors.

According to the CIA, 8 Internet service providers are located in Morocco. These include Maroc Telecom, Orange Morocco, and Inwi.

To access the internet, the following options are available: 4G, ADSL, Fibre Internet, VSAT, CDMA, and public Wi-Fi.

== Censorship ==
In 2020, Freedom House gave Morocco an Internet Freedom Score of 54/100, labeling its Internet "Partly Free."
