= Latifa Akherbach =

Moroccan politician and journalist

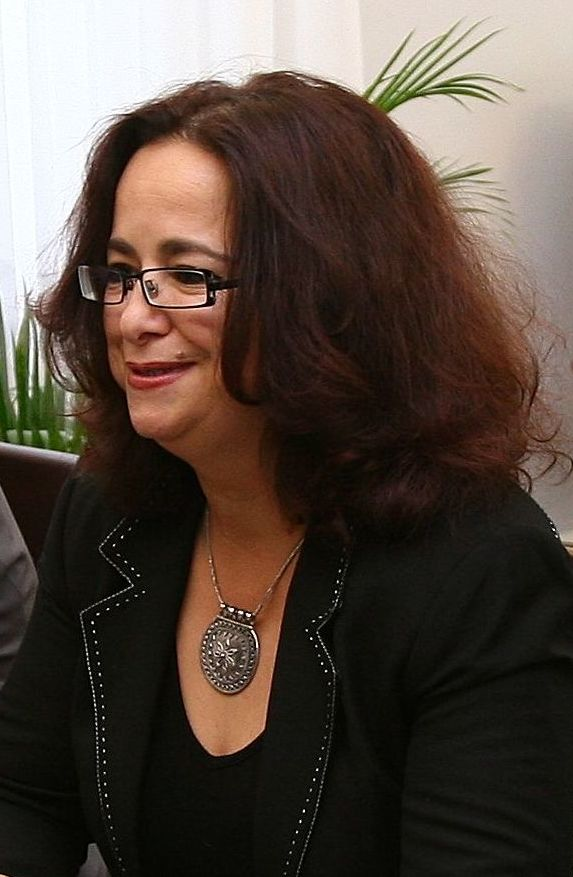

President of the HACA
- Incumbent
- Assumed office 3 December 2018
- Monarch: Mohammed VI of Morocco
- Preceded by: Amina Lemrini El Ouahabi

Secretary of State for Foreign Affairs and Cooperation
- In office 19 September 2007 – 3 January 2012
- Prime Minister: Abbas El Fassi
- Preceded by: Taieb Fassi Fihri (as Delegate-Minister)
- Succeeded by: Youssef Amrani (as Delegate-Minister)

Personal details
- Born: 1960 (age 65–66) Tetouan, Morocco
- Party: Independent
- Occupation: Politician, journalist

Latifa Akherbach (Berber languages: ⵍⴰⵟⵉⴼⴰ ⴰⵅⵔⴱⴰⵛ, Arabic: لطيفة أخرباش – born 1960 in Tetouan) is a Moroccan politician and journalist. Between 2007 and 2012, she was Secretary of State for Foreign Affairs in the cabinet of Abbas El Fassi.

Latifa Akherbach started her career in 1981 as a journalist in the daily "Al Maghrib" and "La Vie Eco" magazine. Sometime in the late 1990s she taught at the "Higher Institute of Journalism of Rabat" (French: Institut Supérieur de Journalisme de Rabat) and in 2003, she was appointed by King Mohammed VI as the head the "Higher Institute of Information and Communication" (French: l'Institut Supérieur de l'Information et de la Communication ISIC), then in 2007 as co-CEO of the SNRT (société nationale de radio-diffusion), heading the Moroccan state radio.

Akherbach co-authored two books in French about women rights; "Women and Media" (Femmes et médias) and "Women and Politics" (Femmes et politique).

== See also ==
- Cabinet of Morocco
