= Samira Sitail =

Moroccan journalist and diplomat

- Born: Sitail born 1964; Bourg-la-Reine
- Citizenship: France
- Occupations: journalist; diplomat
- Employers: Channel 2M; Television broadcaster RTM

Samira Sitail (Arabic: سميرة سيطايل; Berber languages: ⵙⴰⵎⵉⵔⴰ ⵙⵉⵜⴰⵢ; born 1964 in Bourg-la-Reine, France) is a Moroccan former journalist and diplomat, and a former "Director of Information" of the country's semi-private broadcasting channel 2M.

Sitail, who was raised in France, settled in Morocco in 1987 when she got a job at the national television broadcaster RTM. She later worked as an anchor at 2M.

She is known to be very close to the Royal Palace, and her attitude during the 2011 Arab Spring was harshly criticized, including among the 2M workers who organized a sit in against her.

She was appointed Ambassador of Morocco to France on 19 October 2023.

== See also ==
- Fouad Ali El Himma
- Mounir Majidi
