= National Telecommunications Regulatory Agency =

National telecommunications regulator of Morocco

- الوكالة الوطنية لتقنين المواصلات (Arabic) ⵜⴰⵙⵏⴻⵔⴰⵢⵜ ⵜⴰⵏⴰⵎⵓⵔⵜ ⵏ ⵓⵙⵍⴳⵏ ⵏ ⵉⵎⵢⴰⵡⴰⴹⵏ (Standard Moroccan Tamazight); Agence Nationale de Réglementation des Télécommunications (French)
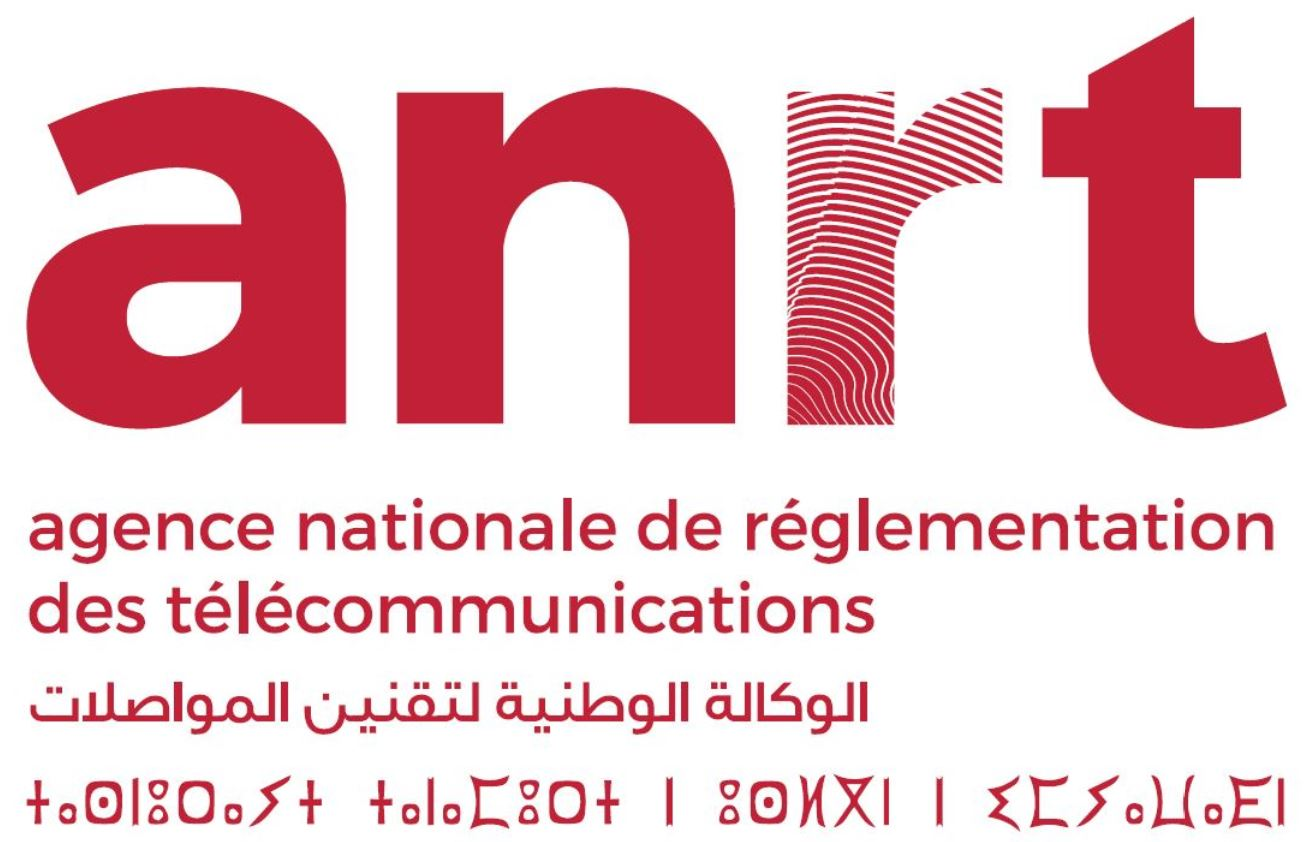

Agency overview
- Formed: February 9, 1998; 28 years ago
- Jurisdiction: Morocco
- Headquarters: Rabat, Morocco
- Agency executive: Az-El-Arabe Hassibi, Director General
- Website: www.anrt.ma

The National Telecommunications Regulatory Agency (Arabic: الوكالة الوطنية لتقنين المواصلات, French: Agence nationale de réglementation des télécommunications; ANRT) is the Moroccan public body responsible for regulating the telecommunications sector. It was created in 1998 under Law No. 24-96, which reorganized the sector and opened it to competition. The agency is attached to the Head of Government.

== History ==
The ANRT was established in February 1998 under Law No. 24-96 on postal services and telecommunications.

The creation of the agency was part of the liberalization of Morocco’s telecommunications sector. The ANRT was given responsibility for applying telecommunications legislation, monitoring competition and managing technical resources such as numbering and radio frequencies.

By the end of March 2025, the agency reported 39.9 million internet subscriptions, including fixed and mobile subscriptions, corresponding to a penetration rate of 108%.

In October 2025, the ANRT and the Administration of Customs and Indirect Taxes digitized the import procedure for telecommunications equipment through the PortNet platform.

In July 2025, the ANRT granted licences for the deployment of 5G networks in Morocco. The licences were awarded to the three national mobile operators, Maroc Telecom, Orange Morocco and Inwi. The operators were required to meet deployment commitments, including population coverage targets for 2026 and 2030.

== Leadership ==
The agency has been headed by several directors general since its creation.

Director general	Term started	Term ended
Mostafa Terrab	1998	2002
Mohamed Benchaâboun	2003	2008
Azdine El Mountassir Billah	2008	25 October 2016
Az-El-Arabe Hassibi	June 2017	present

== Gallery ==
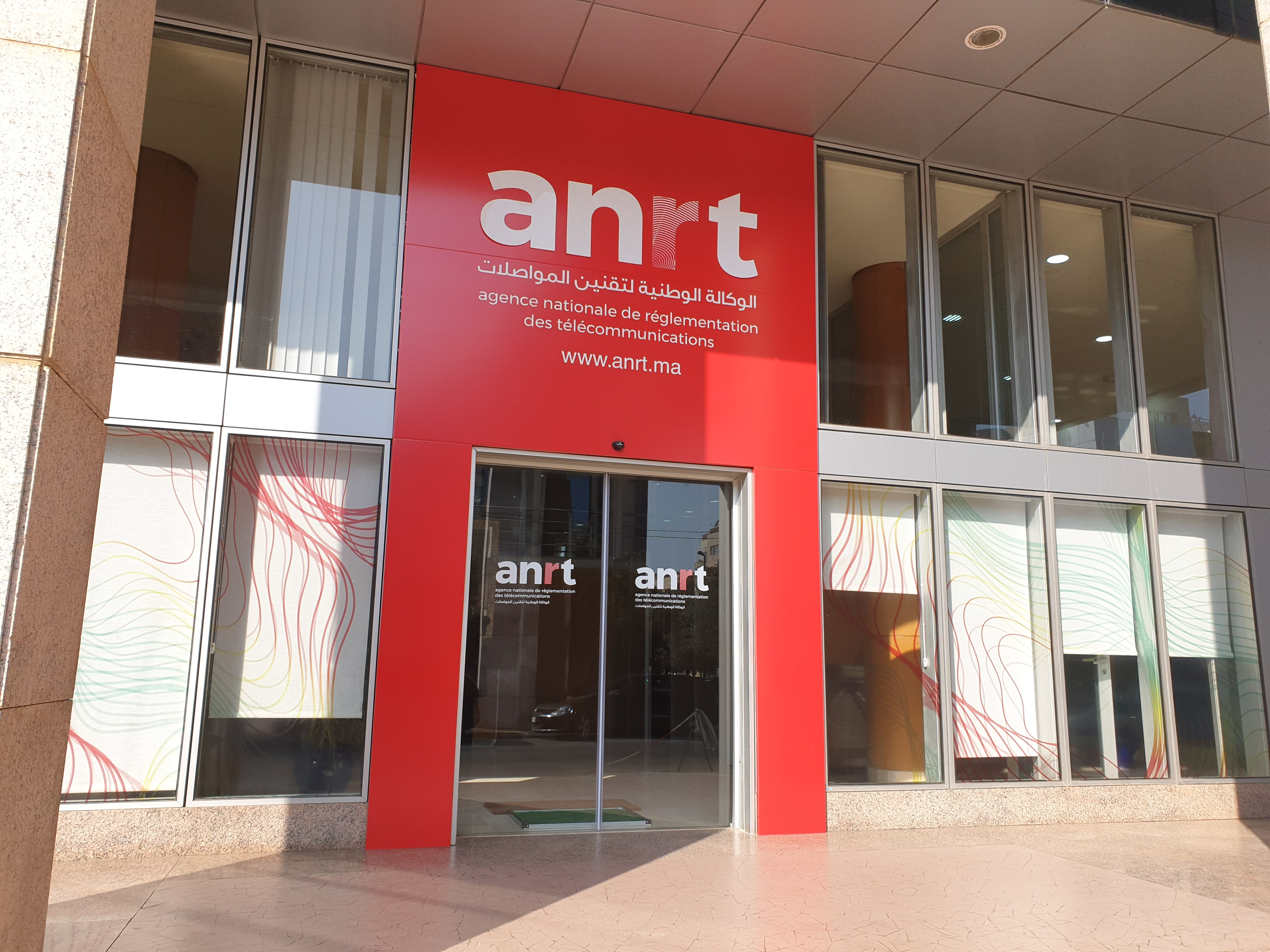
Main facade of the headquarters.

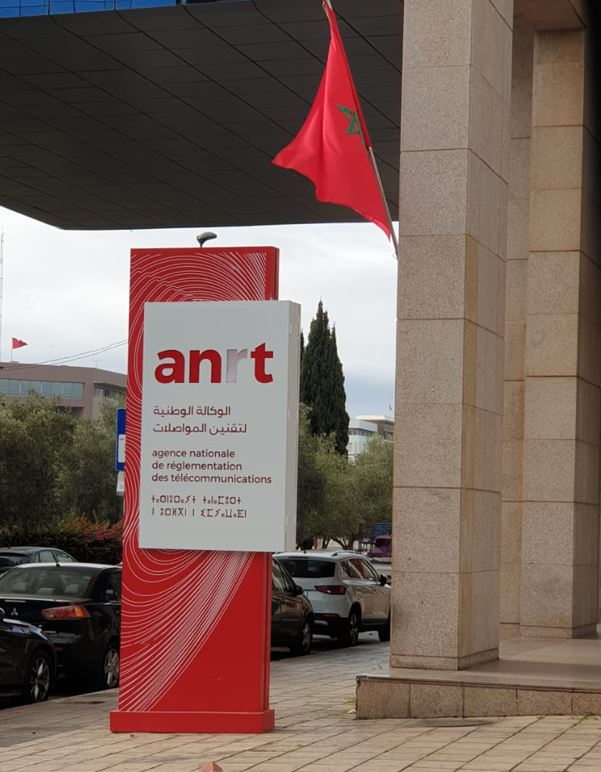
Side view of the ANRT offices in Rabat.

== See also ==
- Digital Development Agency (Morocco)
- Telecommunications in Morocco
