= Poste Maroc =

Moroccan state-owned postal operator

Morocco Post Barid Al-Maghrib
- بريـــد المغـــرب; Poste Maroc
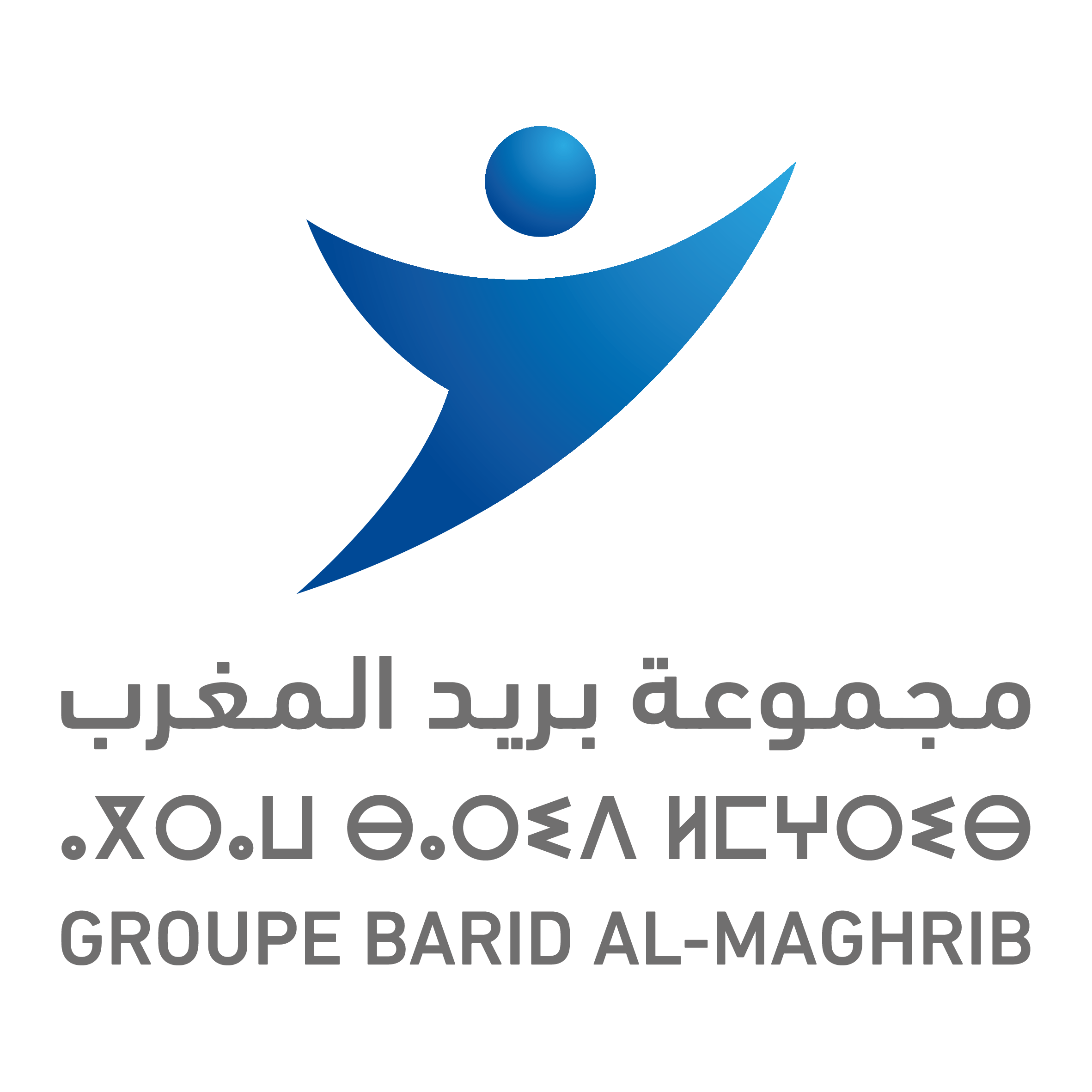

Agency overview
- Formed: 1998; 28 years ago
- Preceding agency: Office national des postes et télécommunications (ONPT)
- Headquarters: Rabat, Morocco
- Agency executives: Amin Benjelloun Touimi, Director General
- Child agency: Al Barid Bank
- Website: poste.ma

Poste Maroc, legally Barid Al-Maghrib (Arabic: بريد المغرب), is the state-owned postal operator of Morocco. It was created as a separate public postal operator under Law 24-96 following the separation of postal and telecommunications activities, and was later transformed into a wholly state-owned joint-stock company in 2010.

The company is responsible for postal services in Morocco and also operates in parcels, express delivery and related logistics activities. Its financial services business was reorganized in 2010 with the creation of its banking subsidiary, Al Barid Bank.

== History ==
Modern postal reform in Morocco accelerated in the late 1990s. The former Office national des postes et télécommunications (ONPT), which had combined postal and telecommunications functions, was restructured after the adoption of Law 24-96. That reform created Barid Al-Maghrib as the public postal operator and separated it institutionally from the telecommunications sector.

World Bank documents from the early 2000s describe the reform as part of a broader overhaul of the postal sector, intended to define universal service obligations, introduce a clearer regulatory framework and prepare the operator for a more competitive environment.

In 2010, Barid Al-Maghrib was transformed into a joint-stock company fully owned by the state. This change came with a wider reorganization of the group and with the creation of Al Barid Bank, which took over the postal operator’s financial services business.

== Activities ==
Poste Maroc operates the national postal network and provides letter post, parcel delivery, express mail and logistics services. In addition to its postal role, it has historically been an important channel for savings and payment services, especially through its branch network.

== See also ==
- Al Barid Bank
- Communications in Morocco
- Transport in Morocco
