= TELMA (Moroccan TV channel) =

- Type: Private
- Country: France
- Broadcast area: Morocco

Programming
- Language: French

Ownership
- Owner: Compagnie Marocaine de Radio-Télévision

History
- Launched: 28 February 1954 (71 years ago)
- Closed: 20 May 1955 (70 years ago)

Availability

Terrestrial
- Casablanca: Channel 8A

TELMA was the first television station in both Africa and the Arab world. It was created during the time of the French protectorate in Morocco and existed for a brief period between 1954 and 1955. It was owned by a French company (Compagnie Marocaine de Radio-Télévision) which was independent from the French state and RTF, effectively making it the first Francophone television station in the private sector, ahead of peripheral stations in the border with France. Its slogan was Premier Poste de l'Islam, Premier Poste Africain (First Station of Islam, First African Station). During its brief existence, the channel broadcast primarily to the European community residing in the protectorate.

== History ==
On 25 January 1950, during the protectorate period, the "Moroccan Company for Television Studies" (Société Marocaine d'Études de Télévision) was established. The decision taken by the Post Office was to transmit commercial advertising and producing advertising links, without paying royalties imposed to owners of television sets. A few months after the project began, the study group failed and gave TELMA its opportunity. On 25 May 1951, TELMA was given a distribution and operation license from the French government to broadcast. Television was seen with potential from the European communities in Morocco. The company continued the work that was stopped by the prior study group. The main shareholder of the television company was Compagnie des compteurs, pioneer in French television technology.

The ground work for the first television transmitter started in 1952, two kilometers ahead of Casablanca. This would house the main station, and included a transmitter, two studios and telecine equipment. Equipment was brought in from France, the United Kingdom and Switzerland. TELMA was backed by the following investors:

- Cie de Navigation Paquet (Mediterranean steamship line)
- Paramount Pictures' French affiliate
- Pathé Afrique
- Louis Dreyfus & Cie (grain)
- Société des Avions Marcel Dassault (airplane manufacturer)
- Radio Luxembourg by means of its French service
- the Suez Canal Company
- Philips
- Lebon & Cie (gas and electrical company)
- TV Maroc (manufacturer and importer of British and French television sets)

TELMA started broadcasting on 28 February 1954 (1 March according to some sources), nearly five months after France exiled King Mohamed V in the French island of Corsica. An estimated 3,000 to 4,000 television sets existed in Morocco at the time. The station broadcast in the French television standard, on VHF channel 8A, from a transmitter in Casablanca, using a 4-kilowatt transmitter. The channel broadcast a weekly average of 20 to 30 weekly hours of programming and opened transmitters in Rabat (the capital), Meknes and Fez. The Rabat station opened on 1 September 1954. The expansion to Rabat, planned since March 1954, was the beginning of a project to increase TELMA's coverage, with the aim of creating a national network of transmitters linked between each other. Further transmitters were planned for Marrakesh, Meknes and Tangier. Ahead of its launch, Le Monde reported on the station as being "an important political, economical and artistic experience". The ownership fee for a television set varied between 3,000 and 4,000 francs, and until the Casablanca station was linked to metropolitan France, its programming consisted of French-made feature films and newsreels.

The station during its initial two months on air was devoid of airing commercials, but was expected to see commercial slots booked by advertisers on Radio Monte Carlo and Radio Luxembourg. There was no plan to price its advertising time with low rates, depending on audience reaction and the potential size of the audience. TELMA took a summer break for a few weeks, resuming operations on 1 September 1954, the same day as the Rabat station opened.

One of its staff members was film director Vicky Ivernel, who died in 1962, as well as M. Jean Luc, founder of TELMA and later director of RTL in Luxembourg, who died in 1967.

Much of TELMA's programming was in French, with little content in Arabic and some in English, added in the second half of 1954 at the request of American forces stationed there, mostly consisting of filmed material from the ABC network. It was initially outlined that the station would operate four hours a day, with French taking the larger share (two hours) and English and Arabic were given two hours each. There were plans for the station to operate two or three sound channels to relay programmes on the three languages simultaneously.

The political situation in Morocco was unfavorable for the station, as Morocco was achieving its independence, TELMA was accused of "anti-French boycotts" from pro-independence groups to aggravate its instability, in a period that started on 30 March 1955. Before shutting down, there were talks of French state broadcaster RTF, as Telma was operating at an average monthly loss of US$57,000 (equivalent to $669,059.63 in 2024) and its first year had a loss of US$2,285,000 (equivalent to $26,821,074.53 in 2024). In a report of the channel in July 1955, "Political instability and the climate of attacks created unease among the European population which soon slowed down receiver sales".

TELMA announced on 20 May 1955 that it would suspend operations, but its broadcasts never resumed. Shareholders tried looking for new buyers, but in vain. One such planned buyer in October 1955 was Europe No. 1, a commercial radio station from Saar with interests in Monaco, who had reportedly bought the company with the aim of resuming its operations. The company was ultimately liquidated in January 1957.

The Casablanca transmitter was rehabilitated by the Moroccan government in the fourth quarter of 1960 for the establishment of the state television channel, which opened on 3 March 1962.
