= Leila Ghandi =

Moroccan photographer and journalist

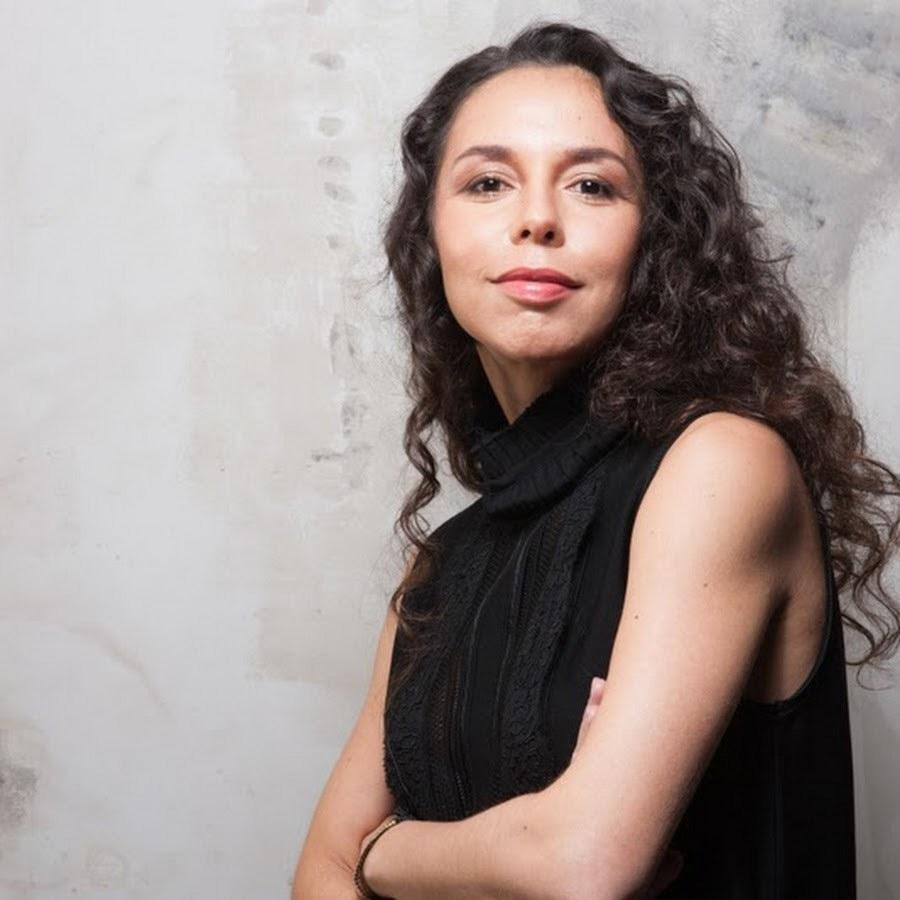
- Born: July 26, 1980 (age 45); Casablanca, Morocco
- Known for: Photography; Television presenter
- Awards: Ordre des Arts et des Lettres; 2014
- Website: leilaghandi.ma

Leila Ghandi (Arabic: ليلى غاندي; born July 26, 1980), nicknamed "The Moroccan Titouan Lamazou" or "Bent Battouta" (The daughter of Battuta), is a Moroccan photographer and journalist.

== Early life ==
Ghandi was born in Casablanca in 1980. She is the daughter of Amal Alami and Ali Ghandi, former Director General of the Moroccan Association of the pharmaceutical industry, who died March 13, 2010. She first studied at the Théophile Gautier primary school in the district of Maârif, and in 1991 continued her secondary education at the Lycée Lyautey in Casablanca. After obtaining her baccalauréat from Lycée Lyautey in 1998, Ghandi joined BEM Management School in Bordeaux and studied international business from 1998 to 2002. In 2004, she obtained her Master at Sciences Po, Paris, in Strategic Marketing in Politics. During her studies at Sciences Po, between 2002 and 2004, she participated in an academic exchange with the University of Portsmouth and obtain a degree in European Business and Management.

== Career ==
=== Chroniques de Chine ===
In 2003, Ghandi traveled to China. A year later, she returned to this country to work at the Franco-Chinese training center in Beijing, sponsored by the Embassy of France in China for a European project.

After these travels, she decided to publish all her notes in a book. This was published in December 2006 as Chronicles from China by Casablanca publisher Layla Chaouni's Editions Le Fennec. The preface was written by Dominique Reynié, who had been her professor at Sciences Po in Paris. To publish this work, Ghandi obtained a financial grant from the Service for Cooperation and Cultural Action of the Embassy of France in Morocco.

In 2008, Ghandi was a jury member at the 12th International Film Festival of Adventure and Discovery in Val-d'Isère. The same year, she won the "Trophy of Success in the Feminine" at the Luxembourg Palace in Paris, delivered by the French Secretary of State for Urban Policy Fadela Amara. In her speech, Amara said: "I am deeply moved and very happy to award you this trophy because you represent exactly the style of free and modern women that must exist worldwide." In 2009, she also received a literary award from the United States Agency for International Development (USAID) for this book.

=== Voyages avec Leila Ghandi ===
Between 2012 and 2016, she animated a program with her name on 2M TV Voyages avec Leila Ghandi (Travels with Leila Ghandi) which are broadcast monthly in prime time for the documen tary program Des Histoires et des Hommes (Histories and Humans).

It is a series of travel documentaries which highlight the culture and lifestyle of each country, through human stories, where she tries to dine and stay with the locals.

During her trip to Palestine in 2013, she met several personalities including Michel Warschawski and Mahmoud Abbas, whom she interviewed in his office at the Mukataa in Ramallah.

With this episode, she won in the same year the Journalist Award in TV category, organized by the Anna Lindh Euro-Mediterranean Foundation for the Dialogue Between Cultures, advancing journalists of France 2 and Arte.

In 2013, Ghandi participated in the documentary of Serge Moati "Méditerranéennes – mille et un combats" (Mediterranean – a thousand and one battles), broadcast on France 2 in the program Infrarouge.

Her episode "Leila Ghandi in Tunisia" was in competition at the Monte-Carlo Television Festival in June 2013.

In January 2014, she was selected among the 50 personalities that make Morocco by the magazine Jeune Afrique.

The program Voyages avec Leila Ghandi has been shown in three seasons, and as of June 2016, 18 episodes have been broadcast:

Episode	Country	Broadcasting date	Channel
Season 1
1	Turkey	March 25, 2012	2M TV
2	Brazil	April 29, 2012	2M TV
3	Amazon rainforest	May 27, 2012	2M TV
4	Senegal	June 24, 2012	2M TV
5	Lebanon	October 28, 2012	2M TV
6	South Korea	November 25, 2012	2M TV
7	Tanzania	December 30, 2012	2M TV
Season 2
8	Viet Nam	January 27, 2013	2M TV
9	Tunisia	February 24, 2013	2M TV
10	Argentina	March 26, 2013	2M TV
11	Palestine	April 28, 2013	2M TV
12	Belgium	May 26, 2013	2M TV
Season 3
13	Egypt (Cairo)	January 3, 2016	2M TV
14	Norway	February 7, 2016	2M TV
15	Spain (Madrid)	March 6, 2016	2M TV
16	Jordan	April 3, 2016	2M TV
17	Bosnia (Sarajevo)	May 1, 2016	2M TV
18	France (Paris)	June 5, 2016	2M TV

== Personal life ==
According to TelQuel, Leila Ghandi earned a salary around 20 000 dirhams per month (US$2000).

During the French tour of jazz singer Dee Dee Bridgewater in 2000, Ghandi accompanied her as a dancer and percussionist. Further, she is also a member of the Brazilian group Batala.

Between 3 and 8 May 2015, she participated with twenty women in the "Women and Power: Leadership in a New World" program organized by the John F. Kennedy School of Government at Harvard University.

== Exhibitions ==
In December 2005, Ghandi exhibited some specimens around the Abbey of Saint-Germain-des-Prés in Paris.

During her trip in China, she took her first series called "Timeless China : la Chine d'un autre temps" which was exhibited at the Lucernaire Gallery (Paris) in January/February 2006.

She exhibited the same series at the Art Lounge Gallery of Beirut in April 2006, under the name of "Timeless China & spiritual, portraits of Tibet".

In January 2007, she participated with four other photographers in the exposition "Regards (de) marocains sur le monde", held at the Church of the Sacred Heart of Casablanca.

In 2011, Ghandi won the first prize of the European Union-African Union Professional Photography Competition "African Beauty in all its states" as a representative for North Africa. Also, her photos have been exhibited at the headquarters of the United Nations Economic Commission for Africa Africa Hall and the Alliance française of Addis Ababa during the 16th AU Summit, held on January 30 and 31, 2011.

In March/April 2012, she exhibited her photographic work "Vies à vies" at the Art Gallery CDG of Rabat.

== Awards ==
- Trophée EuroMed de la Réussite au Féminin delivered in Luxembourg Palace by Fadela Amara (2008)
- Literary prize of United States Agency for International Development (2009)
- Opinion Leader by Search for Common Ground (2010)
- Femme d'excellence by Marseille-Provence 2013 (2012)
- Mediterranean Journalist Award by Anna Lindh Euro-Mediterranean Foundation for the Dialogue Between Cultures (2013)
- Chevalier of the Order of Arts and Letters (2014)

== Bibliography ==
- Chroniques de Chine [Chronicles from China] (in French). Éditions Le Fennec. 2006. p. 176. ISBN 9954-415-60-2. Archived from the original on November 12, 2017.
- Chroniques de Chine [Chronicles from China] (in French). Condé-sur-Noireau: Éditions Bachari. 2007. p. 236. ISBN 978-2-913678-36-1.
- Coll. (2011). "Chapitre 7: La Puja, hommage au Soleil". Les Amoureux de l'Inde: Histoires de rencontres [Lovers of India: Dating Stories] (in French). Éditions Brumerge. pp. 38–41. ISBN 978-2-917745-36-6.
