= SNRT Radio National =

State-owned public broadcaster of Morocco

SNRT National Radio
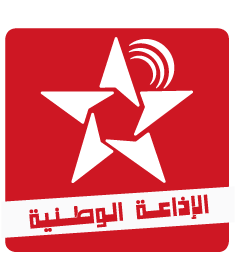
- Morocco
- Broadcast area: Morocco: FM, DAB, TV; Europe: TV; Middle East: Satellite radio Worldwide: Internet radio
- Frequencies: FM: 97.6 MHz - 99.7 MHz (Casablanca & Rabat); 97.1 MHz (Marrakech); DAB: 12B - SNRT National DAB; RDS Name: SNRT R1 Ar; TNT: CH-Radio 1 Hotbird: 0101; Nilesat: 901; Badr: 907

Programming
- Language: Arabic
- Format: politics, news, entertainment, speech, showbiz

Ownership
- Owner: SNRT
- Sister stations: SNRT Chaîne International; SNRT Radio Amazigh; SNRT Radio Mohammed VI of holy Quran

History
- First air date: 1928
- Former names: Radio-Maroc

Links
- Webcast: Web Stream
- Website: www.alidaa-alwatania.ma

SNRT Radio National (الإذاعة الوطنية) is a Moroccan radio channel operated by the state-owned public-broadcasting organization SNRT and specializing in news, sports, talk programmes, and popular music, broadcast from Rabat called in Arabic AL-IDAA ALWATANIA MAGHREBIA mean Moroccan National Radio.

== SNRT Radio National schedule ==
The channel focuses on news (with bulletins every hour), together with discussion and debate on public policy and social issues. SNRT Radio National also carries live coverage of sporting events Every Saturdays and Sundays. SNRT Radio National's musical content is a mix of contemporary and popular Music with a focus on Moroccan productions, with a concentration on specialist music programming in the evening schedules. The radio still retains several old songs and is still broadcasting them.

Among SNRT Radio National programmes:

- Sabah Beladi : 06h00-09h00 (All the week) (Samir Rayssouni/Abdelrahim Basselam/Hanan Ait Ammi/Houda Ait Ouaqqa)
- Liqae Al Maftouh : 09h00-12h00 (From Monday to Friday) (Jihane Mayna/Halima Alaoui)
- Hadith Al Dahira : 12h00-13h00(From Monday to Thursday) (Najma Alami)
- Atini Raeyak : 14h00-16h00 (From Monday to Friday) (Taoufik Bouchiti)
- Top Connexion : 17h00-19h00 (From Monday to Thursday) (Rim CHemaou/Taoufik Bouchiti)
- Maweid Li Niqach : 19h00-20h00 (only Monday)
- Sport : Min Al Mayadin Arriadiya (Saturdays)/Al Ahad Al Riyadi (Sundays) (Adil Alaoui)
- etc.

== SNRT Radio Regional ==
There are other Regional Stations in : Agadir, Al Hoceima, Casablanca, Dakhla, Fès, Laâyoune, Marrakech, Meknès, Ouarzazate, Oujda, Tanger and Tétouan.
