= Medi1 Radio =

Moroccan international radio station

Medi1 Radio (Arabic: مدي 1, also known as Radio Méditerranée Internationale) is a Moroccan radio network. Medi 1 has an audience of around 23 million people. It is emitted from FM transmitters and via internet and satellite.

== History and profile ==
Former logo of Medi 1

Previously a private radio network, Medi 1 Radio has been under the majority control of state-owned broadcaster SNRT since 2024. The station started broadcasting in 1980 and is based in Tangier.

The radio station broadcasts throughout the Maghreb countries and it is bilingual, broadcasting content in both Arabic and French.

Medi 1 was managed by Pierre Casalta (1936 – 2021) from its foundation until 2010. Although the station describes itself as politically independent, two former journalists opining for L'Obs nicknamed it the "voice of the king", noting its subjective coverage of the monarchy. Its slogan is Medi 1, la radio du grand Maghreb.

Until 10 September 2026, Medi 1 was also available on longwave from the Nador transmitter on 171 kHz, which allowed listening to the station outside of Morroco.

== See also ==
- Medi 1 TV
- Communications in Morocco
