= Al Barid Bank =

Bank in Morocco

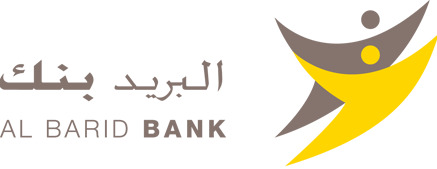
- Native name: البريد بنك
- Company type: State-owned
- Industry: Banking
- Founded: June 8, 2010; 16 years ago
- Headquarters: Casablanca, Morocco
- Number of locations: 1,900 branches (2020)
- Key people: Al Amine Nejjar (CEO)
- Services: Retail banking, postal savings, remittances
- Owner: Poste Maroc
- Website: www.albaridbank.ma

Al Barid Bank (lit. 'Postal Bank') is a Moroccan state-owned bank and a subsidiary of Barid Al-Maghrib. It was established in 2010 as part of the transformation of postal financial services into a regulated banking institution.

The bank is considered a major actor in financial inclusion in Morocco, relying on the national postal network to provide basic banking services to a broad population, including in rural and underserved areas.

== Overview ==
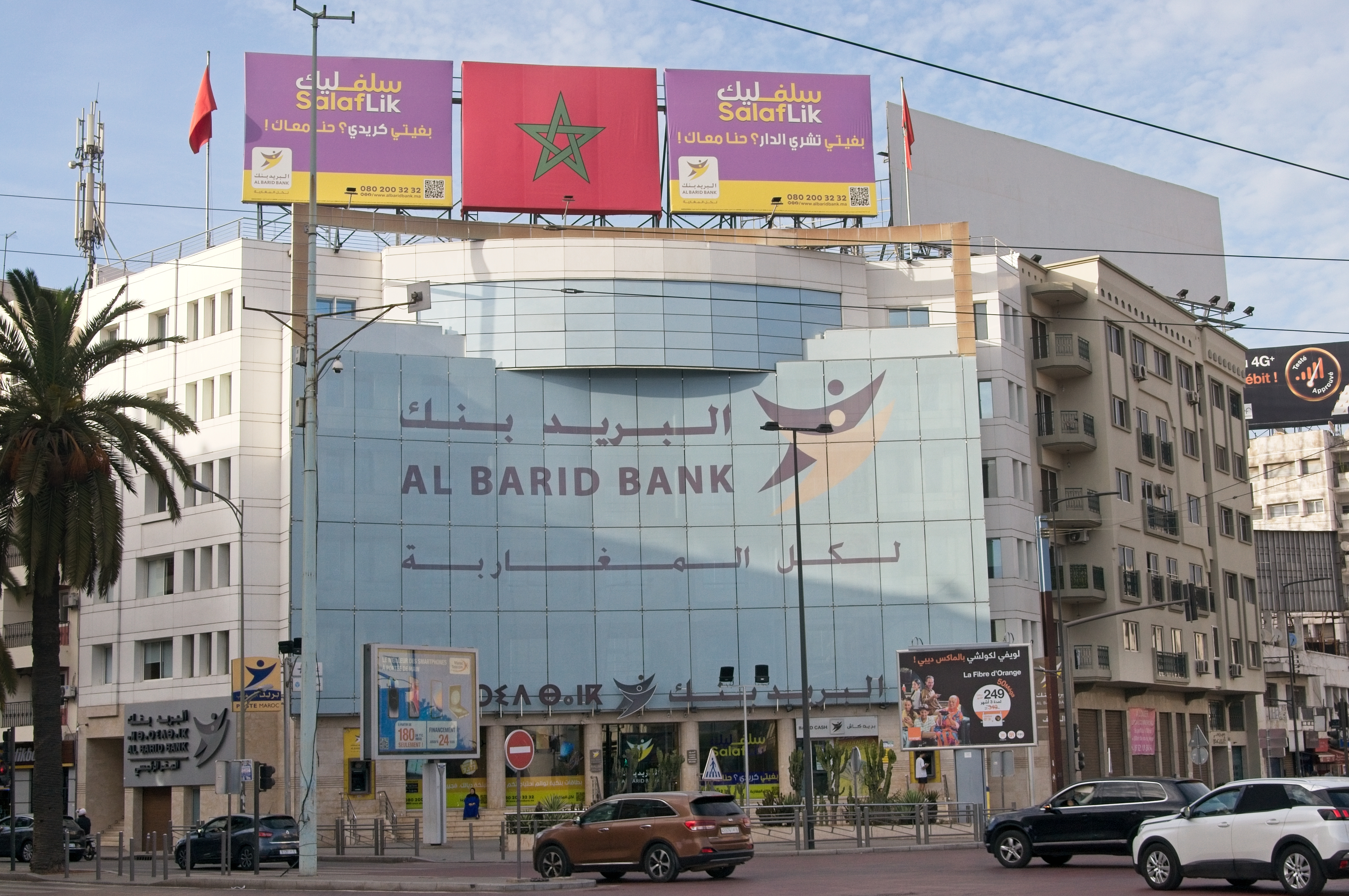
Head office of Al Barid Bank on Boulevard Ghandi, Casablanca

Al Barid Bank was created in 2010 following the reorganization of the Barid Al-Maghrib group, which separated its financial services from its postal activities. This transformation formed part of broader reforms of the postal and financial sectors in Morocco aimed at modernizing services and expanding access to banking.

Al Barid Bank has been credited with enabling significant progress towards financial inclusion in Morocco, helping to raise the share of Moroccan adults with access to banking services from 34 percent to 62 percent just between 2010 and 2014. Al Barid is also dominant in the Moroccan market for remittance services.

By 2020, Al Barid Bank had over 7 individual customers in Morocco, and by November 2022 2.3 million used its mobile services. Its financial performance has increased rapidly in the early 2020s. It has a dense network in the country, with 1900 offices and 920 ATMs as of October 2020.

Since early 2023, Mr Al-Amine Nejjar has been the chief executive (chairman of the management board) of Al Barid Bank.

In November 2025, Al Barid Bank reached an agreement with fintech company Taptap Send to facilitate international money transfers to Morocco.

== See also ==
- List of banks in Morocco
