= Mohammadia School of Engineering =

- المدرسة المحمدية للمهندسين; École Mohammadia d'Ingénieurs
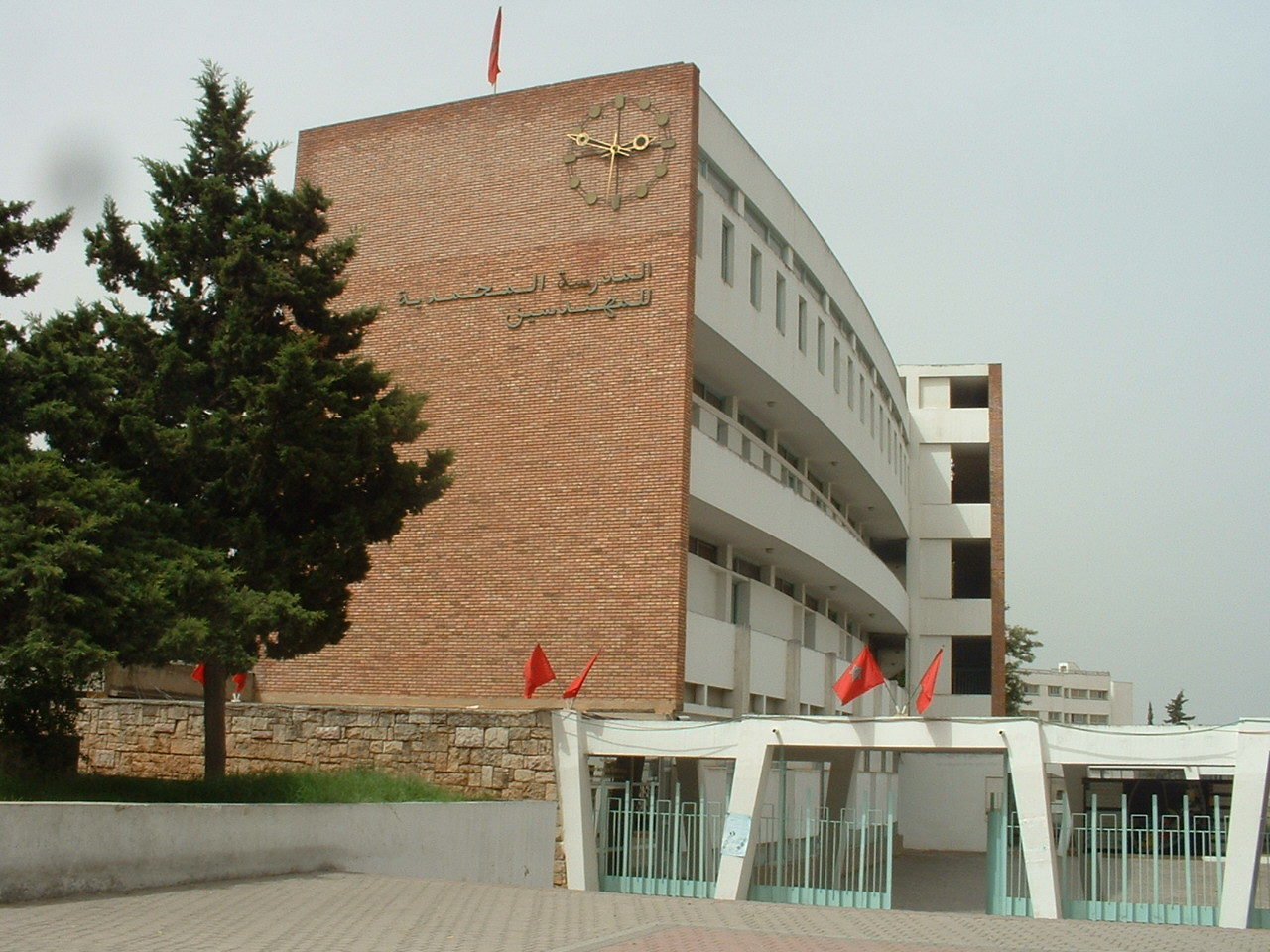
- Type: Public School of Engineering
- Established: 1959
- Chairman: Hassane Mahmoudi
- Students: Approximately 1,500
- Location: Rabat, Morocco
- Campus: Urban
- Website: www.emi.ac.ma

The Mohammadia School of Engineers (French: École Mohammadia d'Ingénieurs, abbreviated EMI; Arabic: المدرسة المحمدية للمهندسين, romanized: Al-Madrasah al-Muḥammadīyah lil-Muhandisīn) is Morocco’s oldest and most prestigious engineering school. Founded in 1959 by King Mohammed V, EMI was established as the country's first polytechnic institute to train highly skilled engineers for Morocco’s industrial and economic development. The school is affiliated with Mohammed V University in Rabat and has played a central role in advancing engineering education and research in Morocco.

== History ==
The Mohammadia School of Engineers was founded in 1959 as part of Morocco’s efforts to develop a national engineering elite in the post-independence period. Its establishment was driven by the need for highly skilled engineers to support Morocco’s infrastructure, industry, and technological progress.

In 1982, following a directive from King Hassan II, EMI incorporated military training into its curriculum to reinforce discipline among students and prevent the spread of radical political ideologies. This transformation was inspired by the structure of the French École Polytechnique.

Throughout its history, EMI has achieved several significant milestones:

- 1960s: Expansion of its curriculum to cover key engineering disciplines.
- 1970s–1980s: Development of research laboratories and industrial partnerships.
- 1991: EMI introduced Morocco’s first Internet node.
- 2003: EMI was responsible for launching Morocco’s .ma domain name.
- Present: EMI continues to expand in emerging fields such as artificial intelligence, renewable energy, and digital transformation.

== Academic programmes ==
EMI offers a five-year engineering degree, equivalent to a Master’s in Engineering. The curriculum includes two years of preparatory classes (CPGE) followed by three years of specialized engineering studies. EMI consists of 9 departments:

- Industrial Engineering
- Computer Science & AI
- Energy and Renewable Energies
- Civil Engineering
- Electrical Engineering
- Mechanical Engineering
- Modelling and Scientific Computing
- Networks & Telecommunications
- Mining and Geological Engineering

== Admission process ==
Admission to EMI is highly competitive, primarily selecting students from Morocco’s elite preparatory classes (CPGE) through the National Common Exam (CNC). Additionally, there are entry routes for:

- International students via partnerships with foreign universities.
- University graduates with outstanding academic records in scientific disciplines.

== Research and innovation ==
EMI has been at the forefront of engineering research in Morocco. It operates multiple research laboratories in fields such as:

- Artificial Intelligence and Data Science
- Smart Grids and Renewable Energy
- Robotics and Automation
- Structural and Geotechnical Engineering
- Industrial Process Optimization

EMI collaborates with government agencies, international universities, and private industries on research projects that drive Morocco’s technological advancement.

== Campus and facilities ==
The EMI campus, located in Rabat, features:

- Advanced laboratories and research centers.
- An extensive engineering library.
- Modern classrooms and auditoriums.
- Student dormitories and recreational facilities.

The school has continuously invested in upgrading its digital infrastructure and engineering equipment to maintain high academic standards.

== Student life ==
EMI offers numerous academic, cultural, and entrepreneurial clubs, including:

- AIEM (Association des Ingénieurs de l'EMI), the alumni association.
- EMI Entreprises Forum, a major networking event for students and industry professionals.
- EMInence: The student-run magazine.
- Eminov: A national technological innovation competition.
- EMI Management: Focuses on management skills for engineers, organizing seminars, workshops and conferences.
- EMIcatronique: A national robotics competition.
- Enactus EMI: An organization promoting entrepreneurial action for social impact.
- EMI Sport: Organizer and representative of EMI in inter-school sports events.
- EMI-Excursion: Organizes trips, visits, and travel within Morocco and abroad.
- EMI Khayr: Initiatives and projects to support disadvantaged communities.
- EMI Industriel: Competitions and seminars on industrial engineering.
- EMI IEEE: Projects focused on technological innovation.
- EMI Aero: For students passionate about aeronautical sciences.
- EMI The Great Debaters: Organizes debate conferences.
- EMI Economie: Hosts conferences on economic current events.
- EMI Art: Organizes artistic events and performances.
- Mohammadia Consulting Club: Conducts workshops on consulting careers.
- EMI Process: Projects related to manufacturing process optimization and management.
- Géoclub EMI: Conferences and projects in the field of geological and mining engineering.

== Notable alumni ==
EMI has produced influential engineers, executives, and policymakers who have shaped Morocco’s industrial and technological landscape. Some notable alumni include:

- CEOs of leading Moroccan and international companies.
- Ministers and government officials.
- Renowned researchers and professors in global institutions.

== International recognition and partnerships ==
EMI maintains strong collaborations with French Grandes Écoles and international universities, such as:

- École Polytechnique (France)
- CentraleSupélec
- INSA Lyon
- MIT and other global institutions

It has also signed agreements for joint degrees, student exchanges, and research projects with universities across Europe, Africa, and North America.

== Impact on Moroccan industry and economy ==
As Morocco’s leading engineering school, EMI has significantly contributed to:

- Infrastructure and urban development projects.
- The energy and renewable energy sector.
- Technological advancements in telecommunications and AI.
- The growth of Morocco’s industrial and economic ecosystem.
