= Télé Maroc =

Moroccan satellite TV channel

Tele Maroc
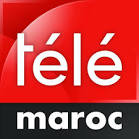
- Country: Morocco
- Broadcast area: North Africa - Europe - Middle East
- Headquarters: Madrid - Spain

Programming
- Languages: Moroccan Darija, Arabic, French
- Picture format: 576i (16:9 SDTV)

History
- Launched: 26 May 2017

Links
- Website: http://www.telemaroc.tv

Télé Maroc (also Tele Maroc), is a private, general-interest satellite television channel founded by Moroccan journalist Rachid Niny. It officially launched broadcasting on June 8, 2017.

== About Tele Maroc ==
The channel is headquartered in Madrid, Spain, but maintains production operations in Morocco, with a significant presence in Casablanca. It broadcasts across North Africa, Europe, and the Middle East via the Egyptian satellite Nilesat.

Télé Maroc's programming is diverse, featuring daily news bulletins, talk shows, documentaries, entertainment programs, and sports coverage, all delivered primarily in Classical Arabic and Moroccan Arabic, also known as Darija. 24-hours a day. It describes itself as "the television with a new vision," focusing on content aimed at a Moroccan audience. The channel is available for free-to-air satellite viewing and through online streaming platforms.

== Notable programs and reception ==
Andi Mā Yufīd (Arabic: عندي ما يفيد, translation: I Have Something Beneficial) is a television talk show broadcast on Tele Maroc, hosted by Moroccan actor and media personality Morad El Achabi. The program features interviews with artists, focusing on their personalities and personal insights. The host's approach has been praised for combining serious discussion with humor, aiming to entertain while providing substantive content. The show is noted for its balance between entertainment and informative discourse.

The channel has faced public criticism and controversy surrounding several of its programs.

In 2023, the program Mintaqa Mahdoura (Arabic: منطقة محظورة, translation: Forbidden Zone) sparked significant backlash for an episode discussing transgender issues. Following the broadcast, Tele Maroc's management pulled the episode from its platforms, stating it contained "irresponsible statements" from a guest regarding transgender people, for which the channel apologized.

That same year, another episode of Forbidden Zone drew widespread condemnation after a guest, a gynecologist, appeared to justify rape by linking it to women's refusal to marry. The remarks provoked public outrage and led to questions about the oversight role of Morocco's High Authority for Audiovisual Communication (HACA). HACA indicated it had no jurisdictional authority over Tele Maroc as the channel broadcasts from outside Morocco. In response to the controversy, Tele Maroc issued a statement clarifying the episode had aired six months prior, denounced any justification of violence against women, and confirmed it had removed the offending episode.

Another program, Dareebat a-Shuhra (Arabic: ضريبة الشهرة, translation: The Tax of Fame), hosted by journalist Bouchra Dou, was criticized for its confrontational style and intrusive questioning, which some viewers and commentators described as vulgar and disrespectful towards guests. The controversy escalated when guest Dr. Samad Benalla (known as Doc Samad) filed a lawsuit against Dou and the channel, alleging that promotional material for his interview was defamatory and that the full episode aired without his final consent, damaging his reputation. Dou defended the program's bold and provocative format, stating it aired on a private platform and was intended to generate discussion.

== See also ==
- Television in Morocco
- Communications in Morocco
