= Inwi =

Moroccan telecommunications company

- Type: Private company
- Industry: Telecommunications
- Founded: April 2009; 17 years ago
- Founder: Karim Zaz
- Headquarters: Casablanca, Morocco
- Key people: Nadia Fassi Fehri, Chief Executive Officer (2015–)
- Products: Fixed line telephone; Mobile phone; Broadband; IPTV; Internet; Banking
- Number of employees: 1,300+
- Website: inwi.ma

Inwi (Arabic: إنوي), formerly known as Wana, is a telecommunications company in Morocco. Founded in 2009, it is a subsidiary of the Moroccan holding Al Mada and the Kuwaiti group Zain.

With more than 380 branches, Inwi is the third largest telecommunications company in Morocco, after Maroc Telecom and Orange. Inwi's network covers more than 92% of the country's territory.

== History ==
Based in Casablanca, Wanadoo Maroc was created in 1999 by Karim Zaz. In 2004, and following the withdrawal of France Telecom, Wanadoo Morocco sold its subsidiary Maroc Connect to local investors Attijariwafa bank and Caisse de Dépôt et de Gestion (CDG) via its subsidiary, Fipar holding.

In 2005, ONA became the reference shareholder of Maroc Connect. In 2006, Maroc Connect won the third 3G license in Morocco.

In 2007, Maroc Connect became Wana, the third operator for home telephones and 3G internet. In 2009, Wana won the third GSM license in Morocco under its Inwi brand. In February, the Kuwaiti consortium Zain/Alajial took control of 31% of Inwi's capital. A year after its launch, Inwi reported five million customers in February 2010 and 13.5% of market shares in December 2010.

In March 2015, Wana obtained its 4G license for the Inwi brand. The Brand had the best rating according to the criteria set by the ARNT (Coverage commitment, quality of service and business plan for the deployment of high and very high speed broadband in Morocco).

The decision of ARNT to block the VoIP provoked a campaign of online protests against various Moroccan operators, including Inwi, in 2016. The company reacted by withdrawing from the sponsorship of the Maroc Web Awards and started the development of an application to use VoIP services.

In September 2016, Inwi was the first operator to offer VoLTE (Voice Over LTE) technology to its 4G subscribers. Also in 2016, Inwi was awarded the Moroccan Digital Awards, which recognizes the best companies that stand out in the digital world, for its social initiative "Dir Iddik", a platform linking the associative world with volunteers. More than 50,000 people have registered since then.

In 2020, Inwi became the official sponsor of the Moroccan first- and second-division professional football championships. As a result, the championship has been known as Botola Pro Inwi since the 2020–2021 season.

In 2023, Inwi expanded collaboration with Subex to utilize AI-driven fraud management and business assurance on HyperSense platform.

In November 2025, Inwi, Maroc Telecom and Orange Morocco introduced 5G, covering major cities.

== Activities ==
=== Mobile phones ===
The operator holds 24.20% of the entire mobile phone flee, in 2016. Following the opening of 07 numbers by the ANRT, Inwi customers were offered the possibility to customize their phone number.

=== Home phones ===
With the Bayn brand, Inwi offers a restricted mobility offer on the CDMA network.

=== Internet ===
Inwi offers Internet access for professionals via broadband ADSL and fiber optics as well as 4G and 5G coverage for individuals. In June 2016, the brand holds 25.15% of the market's share, in second position behind Maroc Telecom. It holds more than 17 million internet subscribers.

=== VoIP service ===
Born from the alliance between Wana and the French company "Phone Systems & Network" in 2007, Bladiphone offers a communication service between France and Morocco through VoIP technology.

=== Double Play Offer ===
In 2017 and in partnership with the brand WanaOne, the operator developed a box to allow a reinforced access to Internet and telephone for companies.

=== Cloud ===
As of 2016, the operator proposed a professional service Cloud called "Business Digital Workplace". This service includes:

- Infrastructure as a Service IaaS
- Desktop as a Service, DaaS
- Software as a Service, SaaS
- Voice as a Service, VaaS

== Other activities ==
Starting from October 2016, Inwi developed a consulting activity for digital companies (particularly Green tech and smart cities), via partnership with Numa Casablanca incubator. A dedicated incubation area (Open Lab Inwi) and other programs of training and raising awareness (Datacity) were launched on this occasion. On the occasion of the COP22 that took place in Morocco by the end of 2016, Inwi partnered with Moroccan Game Developers (MGD) to plan a contest that promotes the creation of Moroccan video games.

== See also ==
- Internet censorship in Morocco
- Communications in Morocco
- List of telephone operating companies
- Orange (previously Meditel)
- Maroc Telecom
- Internet in Morocco
- Karim Zaz
