= Digital Development Agency =

Moroccan government agency for digital transformation

- Agence de Développement du Digital (French) وكالة التنمية الرقمية (Arabic)
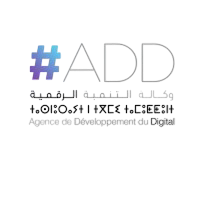

Agency overview
- Formed: 2017; 9 years ago
- Jurisdiction: Morocco
- Headquarters: Rabat, Morocco
- Agency executive: Amine El Mezouaghi, Director General
- Parent agency: Ministry of Digital Transition and Administrative Reform
- Website: www.add.gov.ma

The Digital Development Agency (Arabic: وكالة التنمية الرقمية, French: Agence de Développement du Digital, ADD) is a Moroccan public institution responsible for implementing the national strategy for digital development. Established in 2017, the agency is the central coordinator for the Kingdom's digital transition across public and private sectors.

== See also ==
- Telecommunications in Morocco
- Internet in Morocco
