= Deen TV =

South African Islamic television channel

Deen Channel
- Country: South Africa
- Broadcast area: United Kingdom

Programming
- Language: English
- Picture format: 4:3 (576i, SDTV)

History
- Launched: June 2012

Links
- Website: deentv.uk

Deen Channel, previously known as Deen TV, is a lifestyle TV channel based in South Africa which has an Islamic ethos broadcasting to a wide range of audience interest. The channels content covers a wide range of Genres including, health, education, environmental, community and travel amongst others.

Deen Channel is a privately owned TV channel, owned by Deen Media Holdings (Pty). Ltd which was started in 2011 and officially launched in June 2012 initially on Top TV or StarSat as channel 365 on the satellite broadcaster. In mid October 2013. Deen Channel broadcasts into more than 50 countries in Africa on Star Times.

The channel is managed by a board of directors of which Faizal Sayed, who is also a TV talk show host, was the chief executive officer until he stepped down as chief executive in September 2019 following the death of his mother.

== Programs and series ==
Popular programs and Series seen on Deen TV

- From The Clubhouse
- Be Driven
- The Sunni Path
- The Faizal Sayed Show
- The Friday Sermon
- Medical Matters
- Little Explorers
- Haram Live

== See also ==
- List of South African television channels
- Television in South Africa
- TopTV
- StarSat
