= Libyan Business TV =

- Libyan Business TV Logo
- Country: Libya
- Headquarters: Tripoli

Programming
- Picture format: 4:3 (576i, SDTV)

Ownership
- Owner: Crystal Media

History
- Launched: 1 April 2016

Links
- Website: www.libyanbusiness.tv

Availability

Streaming media
- Online Stream: Watch live

Libyan Business TV (Iqtisadia) (Arabic: قناة ليبيا الاقتصادية) is a Libyan business satellite channel that is owned by Crystal Media and broadcasts mainly in the Middle East and North Africa.

== Facilities ==
Libyan Business TV's studios are located in Amman, Jordan.

The facility consists of one large single studio which houses a number of permanent sets used for different programs.
