= Office national des postes et télécommunications =

Moroccan state-owned communications company

ONPT
- Type: State-owned enterprise
- Industry: Telecommunications
- Founded: January 10, 1984; 42 years ago
- Defunct: 1998
- Headquarters: Rabat, Morocco

ONPT (French: Office National des Postes et Télécommunications; English: National Posts and Telecommunication Office) was a Moroccan state-owned-industrial and economic institution. The body was in charge of all communications and telecommunications matters of Morocco.

In 1998, ONPT was divided into two entities; Maroc Telecom for everything related to telecommunications and Barid Al Maghrib for everything related to postal services.

== See also ==
- Poste Maroc
