= LBC Nagham =

Lebanese music TV channel

- Country: Lebanon
- Broadcast area: Middle East and North Africa

Ownership
- Owner: LBCI

History
- Launched: November 2003
- Closed: 16 July 2011

LBC Nagham was a Lebanese musical television channel and is LBC Group's musical brand. Launched in 2003, as the brand's name (Arabic: نغم; nağam) suggests, it is one of the first specialised music channels launched in the region.

== See also ==
- LBC
