= El Hayat TV =

Algerian Arabic language television channel

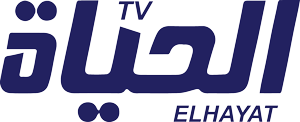
- El Hayat TV logo
- Country: Algeria
- Broadcast area: Europe; Middle East; North Africa; West Asia
- Network: Epcom Plus
- Headquarters: Sacré-Cœur, Algiers; Algeria

Programming
- Language(s): Arabic
- Picture format: 576i (16:9 and 4:3) (SDTV)

Ownership
- Owner: Hannachi Habet
- Key people: Hannachi Habet

History
- Launched: 16 May 2018; 6 years ago

Links
- Website: www.elhayat.dz

Availability

Streaming media
- El Hayat TV Live: Watch live

El Hayat TV also known as (Arabic: قناة الحياة) is an Algerian Arabic language television channel that airs in countries in Africa, Asia, and Europe.

== History ==
The channel was founded in Algiers on 16 May 2018 by Hannachi Habet, the president of Epcom Plus publishing company.
