= High Authority for Audiovisual Communication (Morocco) =

Moroccan independent constitutional media regulatory body

- Haute Autorité de la Communication Audiovisuelle (French) الهيأة العليا للاتصال السمعي البصري (Arabic)

Agency overview
- Formed: 2002; 24 years ago
- Jurisdiction: Morocco
- Headquarters: Rabat, Morocco; 33.987°N 6.852°W
- Agency executive: Latifa Akherbach, President
- Website: www.haca.ma

The High Authority for Audiovisual Communication (Arabic: الهيأة العليا للاتصال السمعي البصري, French: Haute Autorité de la Communication Audiovisuelle; HACA) is an independent constitutional body responsible for the regulation of the audiovisual media sector in Morocco. Established in 2002, the authority ensures the freedom of audiovisual communication, the protection of pluralism, and the respect of human rights and ethical principles in national broadcasting.

== See also ==
- Media of Morocco
- Latifa Akherbach
- Economy of Morocco
