= Telecommunications in Morocco =

Telecommunications and media in Morocco

Telecommunications in Morocco include fixed-line and mobile telephony, internet services and related infrastructure. The sector has undergone major transformation since the late 1990s, evolving from a state monopoly into a liberalised market with multiple operators.

Morocco has one of the more developed telecommunications networks in Africa, characterised by high mobile penetration, widespread mobile broadband use and the expansion of fibre-optic infrastructure. Telecommunications services are provided primarily by Maroc Telecom, Orange Maroc and Inwi, and are regulated by the National Telecommunications Regulatory Agency (ANRT).

Since the 2010s, growth in the sector has been driven mainly by mobile data and broadband services, alongside the expansion of fibre networks and the launch of 5G services in 2025.

== History ==
For much of the post-independence period, Morocco’s telecommunications sector was dominated by the incumbent operator Maroc Telecom, originally a state monopoly. Liberalisation began in the late 1990s and early 2000s with the entry of private competitors.

Méditel received a mobile licence in 2000 and became the first private telecom operator in the country. A third mobile operator entered the market in 2008, when the regulator granted a licence to Wana, then owned by the Omnium Nord Africain. Wana later developed under the Inwi brand, while Méditel subsequently became Orange Maroc.

During the 2000s, Morocco also sought to position itself as a regional hub for telecommunications and offshoring services, supported by regulatory reform and infrastructure investment.

== Market structure ==
Morocco’s telecommunications market is served by three main operators: Maroc Telecom, Orange Maroc and Inwi. All three provide mobile, fixed-line and broadband services.

By the mid-2020s, competition between the three operators had become relatively balanced. Market reporting in 2025 indicated that Orange Maroc slightly led in mobile subscriptions, followed by Inwi and Maroc Telecom.

Technological competition has shifted from voice services to mobile data, fibre broadband and next-generation networks.

== Mobile telephony ==
Mobile telephony is the dominant segment of the Moroccan telecommunications market. According to the ANRT, Morocco’s mobile market is among the most developed in the region, supported by extensive LTE coverage and high smartphone usage. Trade sources in 2025 reported more than 58 million mobile subscriptions, corresponding to a penetration rate well above 100 per cent.

A major development occurred in 2025 with the commercial launch of 5G services. The three national operators began offering 5G on 7 November 2025, following the allocation of licences earlier that year. By the end of 2025, coverage had reached around 38% of the population. Growth in the mobile sector has increasingly been driven by data services rather than traditional voice or SMS communications.

== Fixed-line telephony and broadband ==
Fixed-line telephony represents a smaller segment of the market but has continued to grow moderately. The number of fixed subscriptions exceeded 3 million by the mid-2020s.

Broadband access has expanded significantly, particularly through the development of fibre-to-the-home (FTTH) networks. By the end of 2025, internet subscriptions reached about 41.46 million, including more than 1.4 million FTTH connections. Fibre has progressively replaced ADSL as the main fixed broadband technology.

== Internet ==
Internet access in Morocco has expanded rapidly since the 2000s. By the end of 2025, the country had more than 41 million internet subscriptions, with a penetration rate above 110%. Mobile internet accounts for most connections, reflecting the widespread use of smartphones and the extensive coverage of 4G and 5G networks.

The expansion of high-speed networks has contributed to the growth of digital services and increased internet usage across both urban and rural areas.

== Infrastructure ==
Morocco’s telecommunications infrastructure includes terrestrial backbone networks, submarine cables and international connections linking the country to Europe and Africa. Investment has increasingly focused on fibre networks and infrastructure sharing. By 2025, ANRT reported that approximately 30% of fixed infrastructure was deployed through sharing arrangements between operators.

Earlier infrastructure projects also included plans to extend fibre networks toward southern regions and neighbouring countries.

== Regulation ==
The telecommunications sector is regulated by the National Telecommunications Regulatory Agency (ANRT), which is responsible for licensing, spectrum management, competition oversight and consumer protection.

The regulatory framework has evolved alongside market liberalisation, allowing the entry of private operators and the development of competition.

In the 2020s, regulation has focused increasingly on broadband expansion, fibre deployment and the introduction of 5G services.

== Government policy ==
Government policy has evolved from telecommunications liberalisation toward a broader digital transformation strategy. Earlier programmes included e-Maroc 2010, Maroc Numeric 2013 and Maroc Numeric 2020.

A new phase began with the launch of the national strategy Morocco Digital 2030 in 2024, which focuses on connectivity, digital infrastructure, innovation and e-government.

The strategy is overseen by the Ministry of Digital Transition and Administrative Reform, while the Digital Development Agency (ADD) is responsible for its implementation.

== See also ==
- Internet in Morocco
- National Telecommunications Regulatory Agency (Morocco)
- Digital Development Agency (Morocco)
- Maroc Telecom
- Orange Morocco
- Inwi
