= Medi 1 TV =

Moroccan news channel

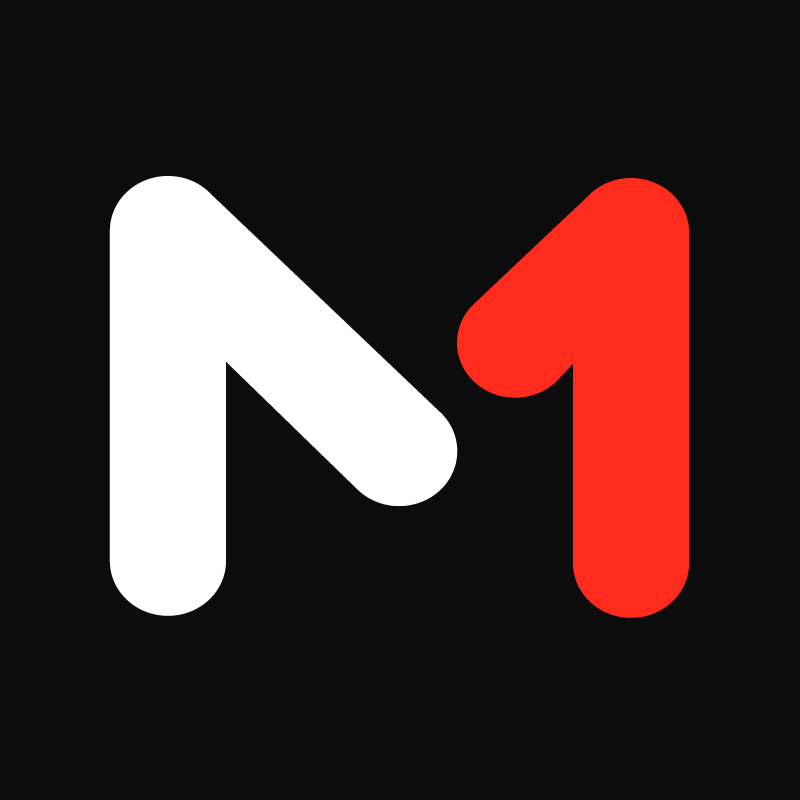
- Country: Morocco
- Broadcast area: Arab world and International
- Headquarters: Tangier, Morocco

Programming
- Languages: Arabic; French
- Picture format: 1080i HDTV (downscaled to 16:9 576i for the SDTV feed)

Ownership
- Owner: SNRT

History
- Launched: 1 December 2006; 19 years ago
- Former names: Medi 1 Sat (2006–2010) Medi1tv (2010-2017) (2017-)

Links
- Website: medi1tv.com

Availability

Terrestrial
- DTT (Morocco): Channel 7 (SD)

Streaming media
- medi1tv.com: Watch live

Medi 1 TV (Arabic: مدي 1 تي في; formerly Medi 1 Sat) is a news television network based in Tangier, Morocco. It was officially launched in 2006 as a satellite broadcaster before expanding its reach to terrestrial and digital platforms. It is part of Medi 1 News, which also operates the Medi 1 radio station, founded in 1980.

The network provides a diverse range of programming with a primary focus on news, current affairs, and socio-political analysis. Its editorial line emphasizes bilingual broadcasting, delivering content in both Arabic and French. Through its dedicated services, including Medi 1 TV Maghreb and Medi 1 TV Afrique, it broadcasts to audiences in Morocco, the wider Maghreb region, Sub-Saharan Africa, and French-speaking communities abroad.

== History ==
Medi 1 TV was first launched on 1 December 2006 under the name Medi 1 Sat, as an expansion of the activities of the Medi 1 radio station into television broadcasting. The channel was co-jointly owned by Moroccan and French public investors. Its initial programming schedule consisted mainly of news bulletins and current affairs shows, covering developments in Morocco and the wider Maghreb region.

In 2009, the channel became entirely Moroccan-owned following the acquisition of the previously French-owned shares by the Caisse de dépôt et de gestion (CDG). Abbas Azzouzi was appointed by the Board of Directors as the new CEO in 2010, succeeding its founder Pierre Casalta, who had previously directed its sister network Medi1 Radio.

On 30 October 2010, Medi 1 Sat was rebranded Medi 1 TV, becoming a generalist channel in addition to entering the terrestrial Moroccan TV market. Plans were for Medi 1 TV to cover 74% of national territory by the end of November.

In 2014, the channel obtained a new broadcasting license after two Emirati media firms (named as Nekst Investments and Steeds Medias) acquired shares within its capital.

On 1 February 2016, Medi 1 TV reverted its programming to rolling news and current affairs. It also split into two separate channels the same year, with one targeting Francophone African audiences. In June 2016, Hassan Khiyar, the concurrent director of Medi1 Radio, was appointed to also serve as the CEO of Medi 1 TV. This came as the Board of Directors sought to "change the management model and governance of MEDI1TV with a repositioning strategic as a continuous and permanent news channel, published in partnership with Radio Méditerranée Internationale [Medi1 Radio] as part of a unique project with a national, regional and international vocation."

In 2019, Medi 1 TV launched an exclusively Arabic-language channel as part of its network lineup.

In 2021, the Moroccan public broadcaster SNRT announced it would acquire Medi 1 TV, as well as its sister channel Medi1 Radio and 2M, pending a reorganization of the channels within a public holding group by 2024. The CDG, via its subsidiary CDG Invest, subsequently acquired Medi 1 TV for 105 million MAD (US$11.9 million), with plans to transfer ownership to SNRT once it meets legal requirements.

== See also ==
- Medi1 Radio
- Communications in Morocco
