= Al Maghribia =

Moroccan public television channel

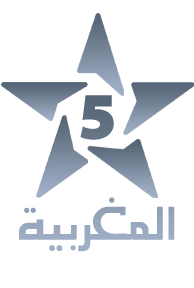
- Country: Morocco

Programming
- Languages: Arabic; French
- Picture format: 576i SDTV; 1080i HDTV

Ownership
- Owner: SNRT

History
- Launched: 18 November 2004; 21 years ago

Availability

Terrestrial
- DTT: Channel 5 (SD)

Al Maghribia channel is a part of the state-owned SNRT Group along with Al Aoula, Arryadia, Athaqafia, Assadissa, Aflam TV, Tamazight TV and Laayoune TV. The channel was launched on 18 November 2004 by Morocco's Broadcasting and Television National Company.

Its programming consists of reruns of TV shows and news bulletins from Al Aoula and 2M. Al Maghribiya was created around the concept of the French TV channel TV5Monde and is focused towards the Moroccan diaspora living in other countries.

In January 2014, Abdessamad Bencherif announced its intention to make Al Maghribiya an international news channel with the purpose of "countering misinformation from Morocco's rivals and enemies of its interests."

The channel started broadcasting in high-definition on 20 November 2017.
