= SNRT =

State-owned public broadcaster of Morocco

Société Nationale de Radiodiffusion et de Télévision (Note: Arabic: الشَّرِكَة الوَطَنِيَّة لِلْإِذَاعَة وَالتَّلْفَزَة, aš-šarika al-waṭaniyya li-l-ʾiḏāʿa wa-t-talfaza; French: Société nationale de radiodiffusion et de télévision, SNRT; Standard Moroccan Tamazight: ⵜⴰⵎⵙⵙⵓⵔⵜ ⵜⴰⵏⴰⵎⵓⵔⵜ ⵏ ⵓⵏⵣⵡⴰⵢ ⴷ ⵜⵉⵍⵉⴼⵉⵣⵢⵓⵏ, Tamssurt tanamurt uazway d tilifizyun)
- Formerly: Radio-Maroc (1928–1962); Radiodiffusion-Télévision Marocaine (1962–2005)
- Type: State-owned enterprise
- Industry: Mass media
- Genre: Public broadcasting services
- Founded: 15 February 1928; 98 years ago
- Headquarters: Rabat, Morocco
- Area served: Morocco, Europe, Middle East
- Key people: Faïçal Laraïchi, President (PDG); Mohammed Ayad, Director General (DG)
- Services: Television, radio, online
- Owner: Government of Morocco
- Number of employees: 2,300
- Website: www.snrt.ma

The National Company of Radio and Television (French: Société Nationale de Radiodiffusion et de Télévision, SNRT) is the public state-owned broadcaster of Morocco.

== History ==
The broadcaster was formerly known as Radio-Maroc, then Moroccan Radio and Television (French: Radio-télévision marocaine, RTM) from 1962 and Radiodiffusion-Télévision Marocaine from 1962. It was one of the founding members of the European Broadcasting Union in 1950 and continued as an active member until 1 January 1961 when RTM changed its affiliation to an associate membership. In 1969, it was readmitted as an active member.

In 2009, the SNRT became a shareholder in Euronews, initially acquiring 0.33% then later expanding its share to 6% in 2011.

In 2021, the government announced, via a televised interview with culture minister Othman El Ferdaous, announced that SNRT would acquire the part-state-owned 2M and private Medi 1 Radio and Medi 1 TV channels, to be reorganized into a public holding group by 2024. The plan was allegedly conducted under the auspices of royal advisor Fouad Ali El Himma.

In 2024, the SNRT formally acquired 86.3% in shares of Medi 1 Radio, becoming its majority shareholder.

== Services ==
=== Television ===
SNRT currently runs eight television channels:

- Al Aoula (SNRT 1), also called TVM (Télévision marocaine, Arabic: التلفزة المغربية): a generalist channel and the first television channel of SNRT.
- Arryadia (SNRT 3): a national sports channel.
- Athaqafia (SNRT 4): an educational and cultural channel.
- Al Maghribia (SNRT 5): an international TV channel specialized in the Rediffusion of Al Aoula news programmes.
- Assadissa (SNRT 6): a religious services and affairs channel.
- Aflam TV (SNRT 7): a film channel which is broadcast via DVB-T only.
- Tamazight TV (SNRT 8): a Berber-language channel.
- Laayoune TV (SNRT Laayoune): a regional channel targeting audiences in the Southern Provinces.

=== Radio ===
SNRT currently runs six national radio stations and eleven regional radio stations.

==== National stations ====
- SNRT Radio National, main generalist station specializing in news, sports, talk programmes, and popular music;
- Chaîne Inter (previously Rabat Chaîne Inter). Operating since 23 March 2009, it is aimed at an urban public, offers music and entertainment programs;
- Radio Amazigh, station dedicated to Berber culture;
- Radio Mohammed VI du Saint Coran, religious station dedicated to Islam and the Quran;
- Casa FM;

==== Regional stations ====
- SNRT FM Agadir
- SNRT FM Casablanca
- SNRT FM Dakhla
- SNRT FM Fès
- SNRT FM Laâyoune
- SNRT FM Marrakech
- SNRT FM Meknès
- SNRT FM Oujda
- SNRT FM Tanger
- SNRT FM Tétouan
- SNRT FM Al Hoceima

=== Acquired services ===
The following services were acquired by SNRT in 2025:

- 2M: a generalist channel; previously partially owned by the government of Morocco and Al Mada.
- Medi 1 TV: a news channel covering Moroccan and international news; previously owned by a consortium of private shareholders before being taken over by CDG Invest prior to acquisition by SNRT.
- Medi 1 Radio: a national and international radio station; previously owned by a consortium of Moroccan and French shareholders.

=== Online media ===
SNRT offers an online portal. The website is managed by SNRT's Interactive Media department.

On 12 April 2021, SNRT launched an online news website, SNRTnews, which publishes articles from varied topics in French and Arabic from official sources.

In 2024, the SNRT launched Forja, an online free streaming platform available in French and Arabic. The platform includes over 4000 hours of content, the majority of which are Moroccan-produced movies, series, cartoons and documentaries.
