= Laayoune TV =

Moroccan public television channel

- Country: Morocco

Programming
- Languages: Arabic; French; Berber
- Picture format: 576i SDTV; 1080i HDTV

Ownership
- Sister channels: Al Aoula; Arryadia; Athaqafia; Al Maghribia; Assadissa; Aflam TV; Tamazight TV

History
- Launched: 6 November 2004; 21 years ago

Links
- Website: SNRT

Availability

Terrestrial
- DTT (Morocco): Channel 10 (SD)

Laayoune TV is a Moroccan public television channel in the area of the Southern Provinces (the disputed part of Western Sahara that is occupied by Morocco). It is a part of the state-owned SNRT Group along with Al Aoula, Arryadia, Athaqafia, Al Maghribia, Assadissa, Aflam TV and Tamazight TV. The channel was established in November 2004, available on all digital platforms (satellite, DTT and cable), the channel is based in Laâyoune (El Aaiún). The channel offers a variety of programs in Moroccan Arabic and Hassaniya Arabic.

== History ==
The channel launched on 6 November 2004 at 9:30pm with mixed coverage (terrestrial in the Southern Provinces and also on Arabsat) with an initial two-and-a-half hour line-up, which was later going to expand. It opened with an investment of 17 million dirhams in equipment and 7 million dirhams for production, with a staff of 25 people. In its initial phase (where the regional programs started at 9pm), the channel primarily broadcast programs in French to reach out to Francophone populations, especially in West Africa (such as Mauritania, Senegal and Mali) as well as programs in Spanish to favor viewers in the Canary Islands and the southern Spanish mainland. Although programming about local culture was a constant at first, it also aimed to deliver a positive outlook of the region, which was under reconstruction. As of February 2006, its news staff was of seven, most of which were formerly unemployed.

On 15 February 2021, the channel started airing sign language classes.
