= Assadissa =

Moroccan public television channel

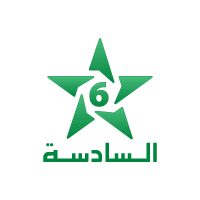
- Country: Morocco

Programming
- Languages: Arabic; French
- Picture format: 576i SDTV; 1080i HDTV

Ownership
- Sister channels: Al Aoula; Arryadia; Athaqafia; Al Maghribia; Aflam TV; Tamazight TV; Laayoune TV

History
- Launched: 2 November 2005; 20 years ago

Availability

Terrestrial
- DTT (Morocco): Channel 6 (SD); Channel 13 (HD)

Assadissa (English: The Sixth), is a Moroccan public television channel dedicated to religious affairs. It is a part of the state-owned SNRT Group along with Al Aoula, Arryadia, Athaqafia, Al Maghribia, Aflam TV, Tamazight TV and Laayoune TV. The channel was launched on 2 November 2005. Its founding director was Dr. Abdelmajid Tribak, where he worked until 2009. Other than readings from the Quran, there are also programmes of religious services, debates, and documentaries.

Since Ramadan 2022, the channel broadcasts 24 hours a day year-round, in order to fulfill its goals to the fullest.
