= Tamazight TV =

Moroccan public television channel

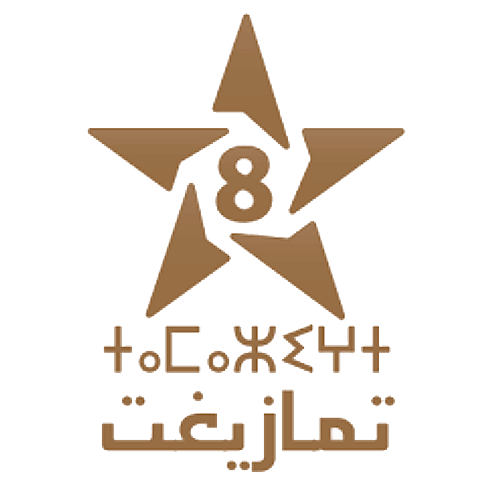
- Country: Morocco
- Broadcast area: North Africa
- Headquarters: Morocco

Programming
- Languages: Tachelhit; Tarifit; Central Atlas Tamazight
- Picture format: 576i SDTV; 1080i HDTV

Ownership
- Owner: SNRT
- Sister channels: Al Aoula; Arryadia; Athaqafia; Al Maghribia; Assadissa; Aflam TV; Laayoune TV

History
- Launched: 6 January 2010; 16 years ago

Links
- Website: tamazight-tv.ma

Availability

Terrestrial
- DTT (Morocco): Channel 9 (SD)

Tamazight TV (Tifinagh: ⵜⴰⵎⴰⵣⵉⵖⵜ), also known as Amazigh TV, is a Moroccan public television TV channel, and the first exclusively Tamazight television network. It is a part of the state-owned SNRT Group along with Al Aoula, Arryadia, Athaqafia, Al Maghribia, Assadissa, Aflam TV and Laayoune TV. After initial planning in 2006, the channel was launched on 6 January 2010. The channel's objective is to promote and preserve the Amazigh culture in Morocco and in the North Africa region. Programming is in Tachelhit, Tarifit and Central Atlas Tamazight.

== History ==
The launch of Tamazight TV followed complaints by Amazigh rights organizations regarding the exclusion of Amazigh programming on Moroccan television. A joint statement was issued in 2008; that year, the Moroccan government committed a budget of 500 million dirhams, or about 65 million USD, for the network.

The launch was met with mostly positive reception by Amazigh citizens, with a representative of the Amazigh Citizenship Network calling it "a kind of reconciliation with the Amazigh."
