= Al Aoula =

Moroccan public television channel

Al Aoula TV
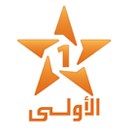
- Country: Morocco
- Broadcast area: North Africa, Middle East and International
- Headquarters: Rabat, Morocco

Programming
- Languages: Arabic; French; Standard Moroccan Amazigh; Spanish
- Picture format: 1080i HDTV (downscaled to 16:9 576i for the SDTV feed)

Ownership
- Owner: SNRT
- Sister channels: Arryadia; Athaqafia; Al Maghribia; Assadissa; Aflam TV; Tamazight TV; Laayoune TV

History
- Launched: 3 March 1962; 64 years ago 28 April 2007; 19 years ago (rebranded)
- Former names: RTM (1962–2007)

Links
- Website: www.alaoula.ma

Availability

Terrestrial
- DTT (Morocco): Channel 1 (SD); Channel 11 (HD)
- Mux 2 (Gibraltar): Freq : E56 (754MHz)

Streaming media
- SNRT Live: SNRT Live

Al Aoula (Arabic: قناة الأولى, lit. 'Channel One' or 'The First'); formerly called TVM (Arabic: التلفزة المغربية; French: Télévision marocaine, lit. 'Moroccan Television'), is the first Moroccan public television channel. It is a part of the state-owned SNRT Group along with Arryadia, Athaqafia, Al Maghribia, Assadissa, Aflam TV, Tamazight TV and Laayoune TV. The network broadcasts programming in Arabic, Tamazight, French and Spanish. Its headquarters are situated in Rabat.

Launched in 1962, Al Aoula was the first television network to produce and transmit its own programmes in the country. In 1972 it began colour broadcasts. It initially had a monopoly on television audience, until 2M (which SNRT acquired it in 2025) gradually gained its own popularity and the creation of private channels was allowed in 1993. Despite the broadening of television offerings, Al Aoula remains popular amongst locals.

== History ==
The Moroccan government had reactivated the facilities of the former TELMA in the early 1960s, which had existed between 1954 and 1955 in the time of the protectorate. Unlike TELMA, which broadcast under the French 819-line standard, RTM opted for the European 625-line standard.

In March 1962, when the station started broadcasting, it operated to Casablanca and Rabat, which housed the former TELMA transmitters. Coverage was extended first to Oujda in January 1964, followed by Taza, to serve a blanket area between Oujda and Fez. The coverage in Casablanca was improved in October 1964, with the building of two 10-kilowatt relay stations near the city. Following the building of the relay station at Tangier in January 1965, the RTM network was connected to the Eurovision network, enabling Morocco to carry international events live. In the mid-1960s, RTM broadcast daily from 7:30pm to midnight, up to 9pm in French, from then to closedown in Arabic.

Prior to 1964, UPI was RTM's only source of news. Much of the content was foreign and was obtained from producers and government agencies. In 1963, France had supplied 14 weekly hours of programming. The United States supplied programming from private producers and the United States Information Service. A USIS feature, Arabs in America, was broadcast in Arabic in May 1964, to an estimated audience of 150,000 viewers.

In January 2018, the channel reported a daily share of 9.2%, far below 2M whose share neared 36%. The most watched programs were Stand-up, a comedy program, and the local soap opera Rdat Al-walida.

== See also ==
- 2M
- Arryadia
- Athaqafia
- Al Maghribia
- Assadissa
- Aflam TV
- Tamazight TV
- Laayoune TV
