= Aflam TV =

Moroccan public television channel

- Country: Morocco

Programming
- Languages: Arabic; French; Berber
- Picture format: 576i SDTV; 1080i HDTV

Ownership
- Sister channels: Al Aoula; Arryadia; Athaqafia; Al Maghribia; Assadissa; Tamazight TV; Laayoune TV

History
- Launched: 31 May 2008; 18 years ago

Links
- Website: SNRT

Availability

Terrestrial
- DTT (Morocco): Channel 8 (HD)

Aflam TV is a Moroccan public national television movie channel. It is a part of the state-owned SNRT Group along with Al Aoula, Arryadia, Athaqafia, Al Maghribia, Assadissa, Tamazight TV and Laayoune TV. The channel was launched on 31 May 2008. It is broadcasting via DVB-T only.
