= Arryadia =

Moroccan public television channel

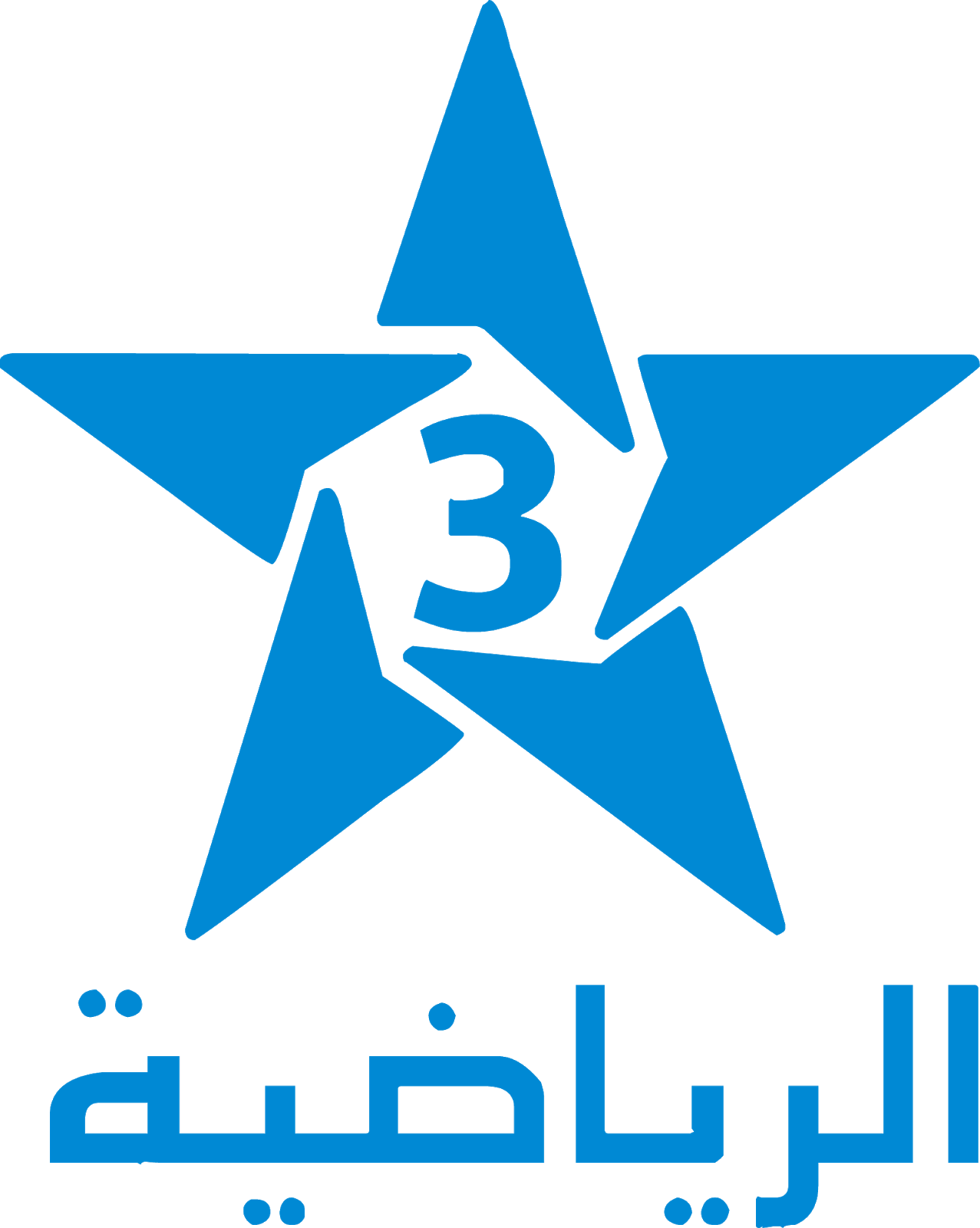
- Country: Morocco
- Headquarters: Rabat, Morocco

Programming
- Languages: Arabic, French
- Picture format: 576i SDTV; 1080i HDTV

Ownership
- Owner: SNRT
- Sister channels: Al Aoula; Athaqafia; Al Maghribia; Assadissa; Aflam TV; Tamazight TV; Laayoune TV

History
- Launched: 16 September 2006; 20 years ago

Links
- Website: www.arryadia.com

Availability

Terrestrial
- DTT (Morocco): Channel 3 (SD); Channel 12 (HD)

Arryadia is a Moroccan public television sports channel. It is a part of the state-owned SNRT Group along with Al Aoula, Athaqafia, Al Maghribia, Assadissa, Aflam TV, Tamazight TV and Laayoune TV. The channel was launched on 16 September 2006. Arryadia is the official broadcaster of the Moroccan league Botola.

== History ==
Arryadia was launched by Fayçal Laaraichi, director-general of the SNRT, on 16 September 2006 in Casablanca. At launch, it had an annual budget of 50 million dirhams, with the median age of its viewer being 26. The channel's ambition was to broadcast sports that were frequently ignored by other channels, such as ice hockey, biliards, bowling and Génération extrême, a program dedicated to extreme sports. However, football was the channel's main sport.

On 12 November 2022, Arryadia obtained rights to broadcast 10 matches including the Moroccan national team for the 2022 FIFA World Cup.

On 28 March 2023, Arryadia hit a new record of 8 million viewers watch Morocco face the Peru national football team.
