= Athaqafia =

Moroccan public television channel

- Country: Morocco

Programming
- Picture format: 576i SDTV; 1080i HDTV

Ownership
- Owner: SNRT
- Sister channels: Al Aoula; Arryadia; Al Maghribia; Assadissa; Aflam TV; Tamazight TV; Laayoune TV

History
- Launched: 28 February 2005; 21 years ago
- Former names: Arrabia

Links
- Website: SNRT

Availability

Terrestrial
- DTT (Morocco): Channel 4 (SD)

Streaming media
- Live Stream

Athaqafia is a Moroccan public television culture channel. It is a part of the state-owned SNRT Group along with Al Aoula, Arryadia, Al Maghribia, Assadissa, Aflam TV, Tamazight TV and Laayoune TV. The channel was launched on 28 February 2005.

The channel was used for distance learning during the pandemic.
