= Maroc Telecom =

Telecommunications company of Morocco

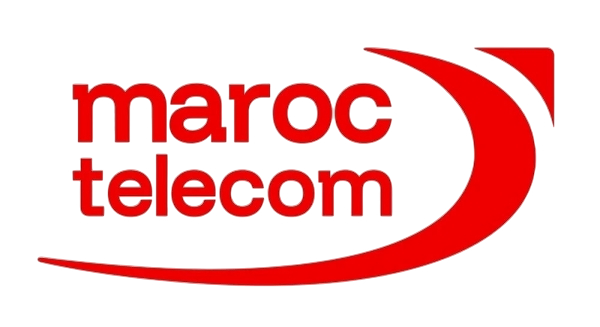
- Logo used since November 6th, 2025
- Type: Public
- Traded as: CSE Casablanca: IAM; Euronext Paris: IAM
- Industry: Telecommunications
- Predecessor: Office national des postes et télécommunications
- Founded: February 3, 1998; 28 years ago
- Headquarters: Rabat, Morocco
- Key people: Mohamed Benchaaboun (chairman & CEO); Laurent Mairot (CFO)
- Products: Landline phones, Mobile phone lines, Fiber-optic Internet, ADSL, 5G
- Revenue: ▲US$ 3,6 billion (2018)
- Net income: ▲US$ 610 million (2018)
- Owners: Etisalat by e& (53%); Moroccan government (22%)
- Number of employees: 10,609 (2018)
- Subsidiaries: Casanet; Mauritel; Moov Africa Burkina Faso; Gabon Telecom; Moov Africa Malitel; Moov Africa Côte d'Ivoire; Moov Africa Benin; Moov Africa Togo; Moov Africa Niger; Moov Africa Central African Republic; Moov Africa Chad
- Website: iam.ma

Maroc Telecom (IAM, Arabic: اتصالات المغرب) is a telecommunications company in Morocco. Currently employing around 11,178 employees, it is the largest telecommunications network in the country with 8 regional delegations and 220 offices present across Morocco. The company is listed on both the Casablanca Stock Exchange and Euronext Paris.

== History ==
The origin of a Moroccan telecommunications project dates back to 1891, when Sultan Hassan I created the first Moroccan postal service. In 1913, the Moroccan Postal Telephone and Telegraph was established before a Dahir (King's decree) related to the monopoly of the state of Telegraphy and Telephony was published.

In 1967, Morocco placed the first underwater cable between Tetouan, Morocco, and Perpignan, France, through the Mediterranean. A few years later, in 1970, a transmission via Intelsat was introduced. The Telex service was then automated in 1971 just before installing a digital center in Fes.

Due to the advancement of telecommunications around the globe, Morocco decided to create a new entity called the Office National des Postes et Télécommunications (ONPT) to manage the industry. ONPT was responsible of the introduction of Analog Mobile Radiotelephony in 1987. Later on, in 1992, Morocco set up the first underwater optical fiber cable. Two years later, a GSM service was operational. The Internet was introduced in Morocco by ONPT in 1995.

After the publication of a telecommunications' decree, Maroc Telecom (IAM) was eventually founded in 1998. The acronym IAM comes from its original Arabic name Ittisalat Al Maghrib. The name "Maroc Telecom" was adopted later for better international recognizability.

=== Privatization ===
On 20 February 2001, the Moroccan government sold 35% of Maroc Telecom's shares to French mass media company Vivendi. The transaction amounted to 23 billion dirhams. On 4 January 2005 Vivendi acquired an additional 16% for 12.4 billion dirhams raising its participation to 51%. In October 2007, the CDG ceded, via its subsidiary Filpar Holding, 2% of Maroc Telecom to Vivendi in exchange of 0.6% of Vivendi's shares, putting the total shares owned by Vivendi to 53%.

In 2006, the company reported a turnover of $2.67 bn. The custom base was established at 1.27m lines for the landline and at 391,000 lines for the ADSL.

In July 2013, it was announced that the firm's majority owner, Vivendi, would sell its 53% stake in the firm to Etisalat for around $4.2 billion.

In 2016, Maroc Telecom introduced fiber optics to the country with speeds up to 200 Mbit/s.

In 2025, Maroc Telecom introduced a new fiber optic plan with speeds up to 1000 Mbit/s, being the first operator to introduce gigabit speeds to the country for consumers, while reducing the price on their old 100 Mbit/s plan.

== Activities ==
=== Land lines ===
It consists of the provision of public phones throughout Morocco. The fixed park reaches 1.6 million lines.

=== Mobile phones ===
Mobile services are provided via a GSM network. Maroc Telecom counted 33 million customers at the end of October 2012. Its network covers 97% of the Moroccan population. It also has 12.5 million customers in Mali, Gabon, Burkina Faso and Mauritania. It is one of the most profitable phone operators in Africa with a revenue of 2.2 billion euros during the first 9 months of 2012.

Maroc Telecom launched 4G+ in Morocco on July 13, 2015.

== Projects and investments ==
On June 1, 2006, IAM launched the IPTV package deployed by Huawei Technology via the ADSL line. The service was the first of its kind in Africa and the Middle East.

In July 2006, Maroc Telecom signed with the French telecommunications equipment company Alcatel a contract for a submarine communications cable connection between Morocco and France. Maroc Telecom's aim is to upgrade the capacity of its services (i.e. broadband services, call centers). The project cost €26 million and was named "Atlas Offshore".

In December 2006, IAM invested in Burkina Faso’s ONATEL, acquiring 51% of its capital.

On 20 June 2025, Maroc Telecom entered a long-term partnership with the International Finance Corporation (IFC) to accelerate digital connectivity in Chad and Mali through a €370 million loan. The funding will support the rollout of 4G services, enhancing mobile internet quality and coverage, with Maroc Telecom aiming to drive digital development in both countries.

During a meeting with Office National des Postes et Télécommunications, the Moroccan prime minister Aziz Akhannouch announced that Morocco will be introducing 5G to the Kingdom by November 2025.

On November 7, 2025, Maroc Telecom, alongside Inwi and Orange Morocco officially introduced 5G to Morocco in major cities.

== See also ==
- Communications in Morocco
- Internet censorship in Morocco
- List of telephone operating companies
- Inwi
- Orange (previously Meditel)
