= Orange Morocco =

Moroccan Internet provider and mobile network

Orange Maroc
- Formerly: Méditel (1999–2016)
- Industry: Telecommunications
- Founded: 1999
- Headquarters: Casablanca, Morocco
- Products: Mobile phone lines, 5G, Fiber-optic internet, Cybersecurity, Mobile payment
- Website: orange.ma

Orange Maroc, formerly Meditel, is one of three major licensed telecommunications operators in Morocco. The multi-service operator offers mobile, fixed-line, cybersecurity and mobile payment offerings.

Created in 1999, it is the second operator of mobile telephony in Morocco. In December 2016, Meditel changed its name to Orange Maroc. The company employs 1,280 people and generates some 20,000 indirect jobs.

The operator serves 14.2 million customers in Morocco and has nearly 450 shops across the country. It also owns a fibre network of more than 5,400 km and has more than 4,000 radio sites, covering more than 99% of the country's population.

== History ==
Meditelecom was created in 1999 following a partnership between solid Moroccan investors, namely the Finance Com group and the Caisse de Dépôt et de Gestion, with Telefónica and Portugal Telecom (currently Altice Portugal) which held 32%,18% each.

In September 2009, the Moroccan groups Finance Com and Caisse de depot et de gestion bought back the shares of Telefónica and Portugal Telecom.

On 21 September 2010, Orange confirmed its acquisition of a stake in Meditel for an amount of 640 million euros, or 40% of the capital, and became a 49% shareholder in 2015.

Meditel became the first operator to market 4G services in Morocco when it introduced the technology in Casablanca in June 2015.

In March 2016, as part of the group's unification under the "Orange" brand, Stéphane Richard, CEO of Orange, announced that Meditel will be renamed "Orange" before the end of 2016.

On 8 December 2016, Meditel officially changed its name to Orange Maroc.

On 29 July 2020, Hendrik Kasteel, who until then held the position of managing director of MTN Cameroon, was appointed managing director of Orange Maroc.
