= 2M (TV channel) =

Moroccan television network

- Country: Morocco
- Broadcast area: National; Arab world and International (via satellite)
- Headquarters: Aïn Sebaâ, Casablanca, Morocco

Programming
- Languages: Arabic, French, Berber
- Picture format: 1080i (HDTV)

Ownership
- Owner: SNRT

History
- Launched: March 4, 1989; 37 years ago

Links
- Website: 2m.ma

Availability

Terrestrial
- DTT (Morocco): Channel 2 (HD)

Streaming media
- CASSETTE Audio Video Visual: CD-VCD
- Ziggo GO: ZiggoGO.tv (Netherlands only)

2M is a Moroccan free-to-air television network. It was established by the royal-owned conglomerate, ONA, before being sold to, in part, the Moroccan government. As of 2025, it is a wholly-owned subsidiary of the state broadcaster SNRT.

The channel is available free-to-air locally on digital signal with national coverage, and on satellite television via Globecast, Nilesat, Arabsat and Hotbird.

2M offers services in Arabic, French, and Berber. It is the most-viewed television channel in Morocco, registering an overall share of 35.4% against Al Aoula's 9.2% in January 2018.

== History ==
On March 4, 1989, 2M was created by the Société d'études et de réalisations audiovisuelles (SOREAD) as the first private and commercial pay television channel in Morocco. · It broadcasts encrypted programs. with two clear bands.

Upon its launch, the channel generated considerable excitement within the Moroccan broadcasting landscape, yet it operated in a complex cultural environment. It suffered from unfair competition due to piracy.

on 1994, it was no longer the internationally oriented thematic channel originally conceived, but rather a general-interest, local channel, in order to express its distinctiveness compared to other sources of images.

On June 19, 1996, the North African Omnium (ONA) SOREAD's principal shareholder is withdrawing from the management of the channel, which is facing financial difficulties. As a signatory to the public service concession agreement, the State becomes the majority shareholder. à hauteur de 70 %, the channel no longer being encrypted.

On January 10, 1997, 2M began broadcasting unencrypted., shaking up the Moroccan audiovisual landscape. The financial turnaround of the company managing the channel is achieved through the support of the Fund for the Promotion of National Audiovisual Media and the revitalization of the advertising market.

On March 26, 2026, the ransomware group APT73/Bashe launched a cyberattack against Morocco's national television channel, 2M TV, successfully exfiltrating approximately 30 GB of internal company data.

== Background ==
2M was set up as a second national television channel with the aim of promoting competition and diversity in Moroccan audio-visual broadcasting.

2M started its programmes officially on 4 March 1989. It used to be a subscription television channel broadcasting unscrambled twice a day. After 7 years of activity, SOREAD (ONA group), the major shareholder, withdrew from the management of this TV channel due to financial reasons. The Moroccan state took over the control of 2M with a participation of 68% in its capital. This takeover was supported by a major effort to develop the audio-visual sector.

In early October 2000, 2M started 24-hour broadcasts, changed its schedule and later started broadcasting on Intelsat on January 15, 2001.

Radio 2M is the companion radio channel to 2M, presenting music, news, and information directly from Morocco in Arabic and French.

== Content ==
2M challenged taboos by debating controversial issues and established a reputation for itself as a symbol of freedom of speech in Morocco. The channel regularly broadcasts news, films, sports and music. It is a government-controlled public TV station and it has been alleged that the government also controls editorial choices.

== 2M in figures ==
- Personnel: 500 people, including 30% executives;
- Coverage: 80% of the population;
- Capital: 302,371,500 Moroccan dirham (€27,008,467 / £18,228,395 / US$36,750,427), including 68% owned by the state and 20.7% owned by Mohammed VI's holding SNI.

== Programming ==
=== Foreign shows ===
2M's successes are largely Turkish series dubbed in Arabic, reporting shares of up to 75% as of January 2018.

==== Former ====
In the past, the local version of 2M aired French dubs of international TV series, as well as some dubbed in the local dialect of Arabic.

- 24
- Alias
- Bones
- Buffy the Vampire Slayer (Buffy contre les vampires)
- CSI (Les Experts)
- CSI: NY (Les Experts : Manhattan)
- CSI: Miami (Les Experts : Miami)
- Cuenta Atràs (Arabic: العد العكسي) (Moroccan dubbing)
- Damages
- Dark Angel
- Desperate Housewives
- Dexter
- Friends
- Gossip Girl
- Instant Star (Ma vie de star)
- Jericho
- Just Cause (En quête de justice)
- Law & Order (New York District)
- Law & Order: Special Victims Unit (New York unité spéciale)
- Los hombres de Paco (Arabic: باكو) (Moroccan dubbing)
- Mad Men
- Medium
- Maid in Manhattan (Amour à Manhattan)
- Más sabe el diablo (L'Ange du diable, El Diablo)
- NCIS (NCIS : Enquêtes spéciales)
- Numbers
- Un paso adelante (Un, dos, tres) (Arabic dubbing)
- Prison Break
- ReGenesis
- Rubí (Arabic dubbing)
- Stargate Atlantis
- The 4400 (Les 4400)
- The Invisible Man (Invisible Man)
- The O.C. (Newport beach)
- The Shield
- The Sopranos
- The Simpsons
- Ugly Betty
- Vermist (Arabic: وحدة المفقودين) (Moroccan dubbing)

American TV shows and Hollywood movies are imported from France with French dubbing.

On both the local and satellite versions of the channel, a selection of other foreign shows are dubbed locally in Moroccan Arabic:

- Sapne Suhane Ladakpan Ke
- Saat Phere: Saloni Ka Safar
- Vaidehi
- Ghar Ki Lakshmi Betiyann
- Beni Affet (Arabic: سامحيني)
- Avenida Brasil
- Larin izbor

2M's children's programming block ("2M Kids") also includes foreign TV shows dubbed in French or in Moroccan Arabic, such as Ace Ventura: Pet Detective, Oggy and the Cockroaches, Chaotic, Tommy & Oscar, and Bob the Builder.

=== Locally produced ===
- Arabic afternoon news bulletin (الظهيرة)
- Berber news bulletin (Inghmissen, ⵉⵏⵖⵎⵉⵙⵏ)
- French evening news bulletin (Info Soir)
- Arabic evening news bulletin (المسائية)
- EcoNews
- JamShow (first season over)
- Sabahiyat 2M (Arabic: صباحيات 2M)
- Rachid Show (Arabic: رشيد شو)
- Shahiwat maa Shoumisha (Arabic: شهيوة مع شميشة)
- L'Couple
- Maa Lnass (Arabic: مع الناس, lit. "With the People")
- Mourakiboun (Arabic: مراقبون)
- Obesity Challenge (تحدي السمنة)

== See also ==
- Samira Sitail
- Leila Ghandi
