= 17th Hollywood Music in Media Awards =

2026 awards ceremony

- Date: November 18, 2026
- Location: The Avalon, Hollywood

Highlights
- Most wins: Assassin's Creed Black Flag Resynced; La Bola Negra (2)
- Most nominations: Assassin's Creed Black Flag Resynced (4)
- Website: www.hmmawards.com

The 17th Hollywood Music in Media Awards recognized the best in music in film, TV, video games, commercials, and trailers of 2026. The ceremony was held on November 18, 2026, at The Avalon in Hollywood.

The nominations were announced on November 2, 2026. The video game Assassin's Creed Black Flag Resynced led the nominations with four, followed by the films Behemoth!, The Odyssey, Michael, and Linda Perry: Let It Die Here; and the video games League of Legends and Wuthering Waves, all with three each.

== Winners and nominees ==
Winners and nominees are listed in alphanumerical order, with winners listed first and emphasised in bold.

=== Score ===
Original Score – Feature Film	Original Score – Independent Film
**The Odyssey – Ludwig Göransson**; Artificial – Damon Albarn; Behemoth! – The Behemoth! Collective; Heart of the Beast – Jared Michael Fry; Tenzing – Rebekka Karijord; Wild Horse Nine – Carter Burwell; Your Mother Your Mother Your Mother – Son Lux	**La Bola Negra – Raül Refree**; Billy Knight – Lesley Barber; Primetime – Ari Balouzian; The Drama – Daniel Pemberton; The Incomer – Tom Kingston; The Invite – Devonté Hynes; Wicker – Anna Meredith
Original Score – Animated Film	Original Score – Sci-Fi/Fantasy Film
**Wildwood – Dario Marianelli**; Coyote Vs. Acme – Steven Price; Hexed – Kris Bowers; Ray Gunn – Michael Giacchino; The Super Mario Galaxy Movie – Brian Tyler; Toy Story 5 – Randy Newman; The Violinist – Ricky Ho	**Project Hail Mary – Daniel Pemberton**; Disclosure Day – John Williams; Dune: Part Three – Hans Zimmer; Hope – Michael Abels; Spider-Man: Brand New Day – Michael Giacchino; The Hunger Games: Sunrise on the Reaping – James Newton Howard; Whalefall – Joseph Trapanese
Original Score – Horror/Thriller Film	Original Score – Documentary
**Obsession – Rock Burwell**; Backrooms – Edo Van Breemen and Kane Parsons; Clayface – Volker Bertelmann; Resident Evil – Hays Holladay; Scream 7 – Marco Beltrami; Send Help – Danny Elfman	**The Eyes of Ghana – Kris Bowers**; Avedon – David Fleming; Running Wild: Return to the River – Alex Heffes; The Cycle of Love – Patrick Jonsson; The Truth and Tragedy of Moriah Wilson – Marco Beltrami; You Can See Everything – Ari Balouzian
Original Score – Independent Film (Foreign Language)	Original Score – TV/Streamed Movie
**The Cauliflower of Destiny – Magdalena Sowul**; Ezma – Mina Samy; Fadia – Daniel Markovich; Girl and Wolf – Arturo Cardelús; Ha-Chan, Shake Your Booty! – Nathan Halpern; Heads Up – Florian Simon Krefting	**Remarkably Bright Creatures – Dickon Hinchliffe**; A Grand Biltmore Christmas – Tommy Fields; East of Eden – Laura Karpman; Redemption River – Noah Horowitz; The Man with the Bag – John Debney; Voicemails for Isabelle – Este Haim and Amanda Yamate
Original Score – TV Show/Limited Series	Original Score – TV Show/Limited Series (Foreign Language)
**Widow's Bay – David Fleming**; A Knight of the Seven Kingdoms – Dan Romer; The Lord of the Rings: The Rings of Power – Bear McCreary; Slow Horses – Daniel Pemberton; Spider-Noir – Kris Bowers and Michael Dean Parsons; Pluribus – Dave Porter	**Free Women – Stefano Lentini**; Collision – Juan Carlos Enriquez; Drops of God – Ian Arber; The Doll – Baasch; The Death Ward – Mina Samy; The Frenchman – Layal Watfeh and Ahmad Mustafazaki
Original Score – Short Film (Live Action)	Original Score – Short Film (Animated)
**The Seventh Turn – Michael Wandmacher**; Am I Going to Die? – Finlay White; Fault – Stuart Michael Thomas; Kafka's Appraisal – Hélène Muddiman; So Close – Katy Jarzbowski; The Conduit – Nikhil Koparkar	**Daffy Season – Tom Howe**; Dear Upstairs Neighbors – Yung Spielburg; Epic Yarn – Fabrizio Mancinelli; Honey Business – Tae-Hyeon Kim; League of Legends – K/DA; Lilo & Scratch – Haim Mazar and Grace Fisher
Original Score – Short Film (Documentary)	Original Score – Documentary Series – TV/Digital
**Cosmic Symphony – Laura Karpman**; For Deer Life – Patrick Kendell-Smith; Stopped – Mina Samy; The Alfa – Katya Richardson; The Baddest Speechwriter of All – Cameron Moody; Untold Mr. T: Pity the Fool – Ilan Eshkeri	**Kingdom – Segun Akinola**; Africa: Earth’s Wild Home – Pinar Toprak; Mind over Matter – Michael Frankenberger; Moon: Nature's Secret Force – Sophy Purnell; The Dinosaurs – Lorne Balfe
Original Score – Video Game (Console & PC)	Original Song/Score – Mobile Video Game
**Assassin's Creed Black Flag Resynced – Brian Tyler and Stephen Lukach**; 007 First Light – The Flight; Aeruta – Red Eyes Studios, Alice Lee, Michael Wyckoff, Rhyan D'errico, and Patrick John Lu; Cairn – The Toxic Avenger, Martin Stig Andersen, and Gildaa; Crimson Desert – Hwiman Ryu and Inro Joo; Fallen Aces: Episode 2 – Josh Barron; Rayman Legends Retold – Christophe Héral, Grant Kirkhope, and Billy Martin; Star Wars: Zero Company – Gordy Haab	**Call of Duty: Mobile – Jade Audio and Vladyslav Saychenko**; Dear Van Gogh – Kevin Penkin; Mobile Legends: Bang Bang – Mason Lieberman, Casey Lee Williams, and Zekai Liu; Monster Hunter Outlanders – Tadayoshi Makino and Yuko Komiyama; Onmyojigame – 2wei, Weixuan Yan, Albert Chang, and Al Ho; Reverse: 1999 – Ricky Lee and April Wang; Tom Clancy's The Division Resurgence – Astraea, Feel for Music, and Sonic Mayhem; Wuthering Waves – Sihan

=== Song ===
Original Song – Feature Film	Original Song – Independent Film
**"One Right Here" from Maserati: The Brothers – Written by Diane Warren; Performed by Andrea Bocelli and Jennifer Hudson**; "Draw You Out" from The Hunger Games: Sunrise on the Reaping – Written by Noah Kahan and Aaron Dessner; Performed by Noah Kahan; "House" from Wuthering Heights – Written by Charlotte Aitchison, John Cale, Finn Keane, and Nathan Klein; Performed by Charli XCX featuring John Cale; "Light Over the Hill" from Reminders of Him – Written by Noah Cyrus, Justin Franks, and PJ Harding; Performed by Noah Cyrus; "When I'm Home" from The Odyssey – Written by James Blake, Travis Scott, Ludwig Göransson, and Christopher Nolan; Performed by James Blake, Travis Scott, and Ludwig Göransson; "Your God Is Sleeping" from Behemoth! – Written by Lukas Frank; Performed by Loren Kramar, Pascal Stevenson, Lukas Frank, and Gregory Uhlmann	**"La Nieve" from La Bola Negra – Written by Guitarricadelafuente, Raül Refree, and Lucas Duran; Performed by Guitarricadelafuente**; "Brothers Keep Goin' Anyway" from Brother Verses Brother – Written and Performed by Ethan Gold; "Hollywood Man" from Billy Knight – Written and Performed by Beck; "How Could You Leave" from Bloom – Written by Brandon Jarrett and Amber Frank; Performed by Amber Frank; "On Video" from Primetime – Written by Phoebe Bridgers, Jack Antonoff, and Christian Lee Hutson; Performed by Phoebe Bridgers; "This City May Have Chewed Me Up (But It Hasn’t Spit Me Out)" from The Debut – Written by Jesse Eisenberg; Performed by Julianne Moore
Original Song – Animated Film	Original Song – Documentary
**"I Knew It, I Knew You" from Toy Story 5 – Written by Taylor Swift and Jack Antonoff; Performed by Taylor Swift**; "Bottle Up" from Paw Patrol: The Dino Movie – Written by Ed Sheeran, Savan Kotecha, Johnny McDaid, and Ilya Salmanzadeh; Performed by The Backstreet Boys; "BRB" from Forgotten Island – Written by Ryan Tedder and Gabriella Wilson; Performed by H.E.R. And Liza Soberano; "Someone to Hold" from Steps – Written by Justin Tranter; Performed by Jennie; "The Better Part of Bravery" from Wildwood – Written by Colin Meloy; Performed by The Decemberists	**"What Lies with You" from Linda Perry: Let It Die Here – Written and Performed by Linda Perry**; "Let Me Sell You a Dream" from Musk – Written by David Byrne and Daniel Pemberton; Performed by David Byrne; "Light Up" from Kylie – Written by Kylie Minogue, Richard Stannard, Duck Blackwell, Luke Fitton, and Chris Martin; Performed by Kylie Minogue; "Stay True" from Nothing to See Here: Watts – Written by Brandon "Stix" Salaam-Bailey, Marcus Hodge, Christopher Black, Johnny McKenzie, Rosemarie Peralta, and Daysha Morgan; Performed by Rosemarie featuring Jay Rock; "Younger You" from Hannah Montana 20th Anniversary Special – Written by Miley Cyrus, Michael Pollack, Stefan Johnson, Jordan K. Johnson, Gregory "Aldae" Hein, and Jon Bellion; Performed by Miley Cyrus
Original Song – TV Show/Limited Series	Original Song – Video Game (Console & PC)
**"Walk With Kings" from The Greatest – Written and Performed by Marcus Bell**; "Morning Shall Come" from The Lord of the Rings: The Rings of Power – Written by Bear McCreary, Aurora, and JD Payne; Performed by Bear McCreary and Aurora; "Need Someone" from The Pitt – Written by Gavin Brivik and Andrew Bird; Performed by Andrew Bird; "Raise Him Up" from The Boys – Written by Christopher Lennertz and Daveed Diggs; Performed by Daveed Diggs; "We Are South America" from South Park – Written and Performed by Brad Paisley; "Well" from The Devil Between Us – Written by Aili Sun; Performed by Hua-Tao Teng; "Worlds Collide" from Sugarcreek Amish Mysteries – Written and Performed by Sandro Morales-Santoro and Glenna Gasparian	**"First Light" from 007 First Light – Written by Lana Del Rey and David Arnold; Performed by Lana Del Rey**; "Lone Survivor" from Delta Force – Written by Jules Mathieu and Melqui Alvarez; Performed by Delta Force and Blaze Johnson Jr.; "Pain Is Salvation" from Europa Universalis V – Written by Håkan Glänte; Performed by Norrköping Symphony Orchestra and Göteborg Baroque and The Gothenburg Symphony Vocal Ensemble; "Salvation" from League of Legends – Written by J.D. Spears and Mary Clare Clemons; Performed by Mary Clare Clemons; "Shining Star" from Marvel Rivals – Written Nao and Danny Koo; performed by Chrissy Costanza; "The Wanderer" from Marvel's Wolverine – Written and performed by Hudson Freeman and David Fleming; "Voyaging Star's Farewell" from Wuthering Waves – Written by Jixwang and Xulai; Performed by Tarokiki featuring Emi Evans
Song – Onscreen Performance (Film)	Song – Onscreen Performance (TV Show/Limited Series)
**"Bad" from Michael – Performed by Jaafar Jackson**; "Brothers Keep Goin’ Anyway" from Brother Verses Brother – Performed by Ethan Gold; "This City May Have Chewed Me Up (But It Hasn’t Spit Me Out)" from The Debut – Performed by Julianne Moore; "What Lies with You" from Linda Perry: Let It Die Here – Performed by Linda Perry; "How to Write a Song Without You" from Power Ballad – Performed by Nick Jonas	**"Raise Him Up" from The Boys – Performed by Daveed Diggs**; "Locked Out of Heaven" from Malcolm in the Middle: Life's Still Unfair – Performed by Bryan Cranston; "The Loneliness" from The Vampire Lestat – Performed by Daniel Hart; "Perfect Princess" from Descendants: Wicked Wonderland – Performed by Kylie Cantrall, Malia Baker, and Descendants: Wicked Wonderland Cast; "Manchild" from The Muppet Show – Performed by Sabrina Carpenter and The Muppets
Song – Short Film	Original Song/Score – Commercial Advertisement
**"Tunapaa (We Rise)" from Tunapaa (We Rise) – Written by Scott R. Hansen; Performed by Truraw featuring Sandriana**; "At The End of the Door" from Alkebulan III The Water Remembers – Written by Matt B, Angela V. Benson, Matte 'Tarley' Shahidu; Performed by Matt B featuring Kabusa Oriental Choir & Royal Philharmonic Orchestra; "Gravel Hill" from Gravel Hill – Written and performed by Amanda Abizaid and Paul Webster; "Red Reverie" from Dear Upstairs Neighbors – Written by Phil Sgrosso, Joe Rickard, Yung Spielburg, and Cove Reber; Performed by Yung Spielburg; "What Do You Wanna Play?" from Spooky Month: The Wacky Wicked Woods – Written by Bryan Teoh; Performed by Kayleigh McKee	**Xfinity: "Change Happens Fast" – Alexandra Petkovski**; Angry Birds 3 – Heitor Pereira; Roland-Garros: "Champions Are Made for Clay" – Niccolò Pacella for Bleeding Fingers Music; Garnier: "The Signature" – Laurent Courbier; Jalisco Is Mexico – Juan Carlos Enriquez; Sea of Remnants – Al Ho and Sibo Huang

=== Main Title Theme ===
Main Title Theme – TV Show/Limited Series	Main Title Theme – TV Show (Foreign Language)
**Pluribus – Dave Porter**; Fightland – Curtis Jackson III and Ky Miller; Lucky – Fiona Apple; Spider-Noir – Sebastian Kole, Warren Oak Felder, and Jayme Silverstein; The Greatest – Wyclef Jean and Ben Watkins; The Vampire Lestat – Daniel Hart	**Kaan Insaan – Layal Watfeh**; Gusto Italiano – Davide Caprelli; Reykjavik Fusion – Veigar Margeirsson; The Death Ward – Mina Samy; Wuyue Kingdom – Zhiyi Wang

=== Music Supervision ===
Music Supervision – Film	Music Supervision – Television
**The Devil Wears Prada 2 – Julia Michels**; 40 Watts from Nowhere – Mara Kuge; Michael – John Warhurst; Mr. Irrelevant – Gabe Hilfer; Tony – Mandy Malmet; Wuthering Heights – Nicolette Di Dia	**The Boroughs – Nora Felder**; JAŸ-Z In 8 – Sean Fernald and Jody Friedman; Margo's Got Money Troubles – Ciara Elwis; Monster: The Lizzie Borden Story – Amanda Krieg Thomas and Anna Romanoff; P-Valley – Stephanie Diaz-Matos, Sarah Bromberg, and Katori Hall; The Chi – Derryck 'Big Tank' Thornton; The Greatest – Robin Urdang; Widow's Bay – Toko Nagata
Music Supervision – Video Game
**Star Wars: Zero Company – Steve Schnur**; Assassin's Creed Black Flag Resynced – Bénédicte Ouimet and Erik-Jon Evangelista; Doom: The Dark Ages – David Kizale and Hugo Martin; Overwatch – Ongoing seasonal content and various collaborations including Yoasobi and Le Sserafim; Rayman Legends Retold – Manu Bachet; Sea of Remnants – Jingfei Wang, Sibo Huang, and Kaifan Ye

=== Other ===
Music Themed Film, Biopic or Musical	Music Documentary – Special Program
**Behemoth! – Tony Gilroy**; Brother Verses Brother – Ari Gold; Descendants: Wicked Wonderland – Kimmy Gatewood; Michael – Antoine Fuqua; The Muppet Show – Alex Timbers	**The Rise of the Red Hot Chili Peppers: Our Brother, Hillel – Ben Feldman**; 40 Watts from Nowhere – Sue Carpenter; Hannah Montana 20th Anniversary Special – Sam Wrench; Linda Perry: Let It Die Here – Don Hardy; Man on the Run – Morgan Neville; Mark Isham: The Voice Within – Scientology Media Productions; Oasis: Don't Look Back in Anger – Will Lovelace and Dylan Southern
Soundtrack Album	Music Design – Trailer
**Assassin's Creed Black Flag Resynced – Ubisoft Music**; Moon: Nature's Secret Force – Sky Music; Prehistoric Planet: Ice Age – Milan Records; Ted Lasso Season 4 – Watertower Music; Star Wars: Galactic Racer – Walt Disney Records	**Call of Duty: Modern Warfare 4 Reveal Trailer – 2WEI and Hour to Home**; Assassin's Creed Black Flag Resynced – Woodkid; Blueline – Kankawee Nilthajan; Destiny 2 – Brendon Williams; Guild Wars 3 – Kazuma Jinnouchi; Valorant – Grabbitz, Oli Sykes, and Courtney LaPlante
Music Video	Live Concert for Visual Media
**"By Any Means" from By Any Means – Fran Strine**; "Beautiful" from Beautiful – Sara Gilbert; "BRB" from Forgotten Island – Bianca Catbagan and H.E.R.; "Curva Grande" from Curva Grande: Pictures at the Exhibition: The Paintings of Bob Peak – Robert Towson; "I'm So in Love with You" from I'm So in Love with You – William D. Murrell Jr.; "Tunapaa (We Rise)" from Tunapaa (We Rise) – Jeremiah Mzungu and Ileni Joseph; "When I'm Home" from The Odyssey – Travis Scott	**Warframe Tennoconcert 2026 – Matthew Chalmers**; Arknights Ambience Synesthesia 2026 – Various Artists; Kork & Helene Bøksle – Knut Avenstroup Haugen; Live From the Temple – Abbie Thomas & the Crazy Hearts; Wuthering Waves Concert Tour – Kuro Games
Exhibitions, Theme Parks, Special Projects
**Cirque Du Soleil'auana – Cirque du Soleil and Evan Duffy**; Centered in the Universe (Griffith Observatory) – Scott Liggett, William Ashford, and Alan Ett; League of Legends "Know My Name" – True Damage; National Geographic: Boundless – Erik Desiderio; Tchaikovsky's Nutcracker the Music Game – Music for Musical Jigsaw Puzzles and Sound Design for Nuthouse
