= Lina Khoury =

Lebanese writer (born 1976)

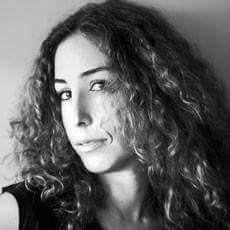
- Lebanese Theatre Director
- Born: April 27, 1976 (age 50); Lebanon
- Occupation: Theatre Director/ Producer
- Years active: 1997- Present

Lina Khoury (Arabic لينا خوري), born April 27, 1976, is a Lebanese theatre director, writer, producer, and educator. She is known for tackling taboo subjects and raising controversial questions in her plays.

== Early life ==
Khoury was born in Trieste, Italy in 1976 from a Lebanese father and a Syrian mother from Assyrian ancestry. Khoury grew up in an era defined by Lebanon’s civil war. In 1997 Khoury graduated from the Lebanese American University (LAU), with a B.A. degree in Communication Arts. After working as an actress and assistant director in few television shows and plays as well as hosting two radio shows, Khoury moved to the United States, where she pursued her graduate studies and earned her M.F.A in Theatre Directing from the University of Arkansas (UOA) in 2002.

== Career ==
Professor Lina Khoury is an academic; and a theatrical director, playwright and producer.

Since Khoury moved back to Beirut in 2003, she has taught, given workshops and master classes in Acting, Script Writing and Directing for theatre, Film and Television in various academic institutions in Beirut, mainly LAU, ALBA, AUST, USJ and The Lebanese University. Khoury is currently a full time Assistant Professor of Theatre at LAU, and the coordinator of the Performing Arts and Television and Film programs.

Khoury’s main work and passion is in theatre. She chooses to work on controversial topics that reflect the society’s mal functions as she sees it, daring to question inherited beliefs and norms with wit and style. Khoury’s influence is felt throughout Lebanese contemporary theatre through her adoption of ground breaking view points, and management of talents as Gabriel Yammine, Roula Hmade, Rita Hayek, Talal El Jourdi, Diamand Bou Aboud, Patricia Namour, Elie Mitri, Nada Abou Farhat, Tarek Tamim, Alain Saadeh, Anjo Rihan, and the renowned Ziad Al Rahbani.

In 2004 Khoury started working on her first play, Haki Niswan; which premiered in the spring of 2006. It was inspired by Eve Ensler’s Vagina Monologues and was a pioneer play that tackled taboo subjects in the Lebanese society and the Arab World, mainly those of women's issues and sexual freedom. Haki Niswan took the Lebanese theatrical scene by storm and played for two years (from 2006 till 2008) to full house audiences. Khoury’s fame rose instantly, as the play had raving reviews from local, national, and international media.

In 2009, Khoury wrote, directed and produced Sar Lazem Nihki, a human comedy about relationships between men and women. The play delved deep into the complicated relationship problems between the two sexes as Khoury saw it. Majnoun Yehki, was the third major play that Khoury directed and produced; it premiered in 2013. Based on Tom Stoppard’s EGBDF, it was a musical black comedy which ironically questioned the oppression of regimes and the humanity of individuals. The play featured Ziad Al Rahbani, whom Khoury brought back to the theatre, 20 years after his last play.

In 2016 Khoury put Issam Mahfouz’s controversial play Limatha... on stage. Khoury chose to stage this social political tragi-comedy to shed light on the situation of acceptance and numbness of the Lebanese society. Khoury transformed the stage into a number of locations using few props and directed 20 actors present on stage throughout the whole play. The controversy heightened due to her bravery in implicating the religious connection to the socio-political factors of oppression. In 2018, Khoury wrote, (with the help of writers Fouad Yammine and Rami El Tawil), directed and produced Haki Rjel an Avant-garde Black Comedy, which is a sequel to her hit play, Haki Niswan. The play delved into the hidden world of men and recounted, for the first time in Lebanon and the SWANA region, stories of oppressed men, in a society that is well trenched in masculinity and where women are oppressed and face discrimination on multiple levels.

In 2023, Khoury directed “Behind the Curtains-Waraa Al Sitar”, commissioned by Seenaryo, where she met youth from Tripoli and Akkar, wrote down their stories about the many sides of violence that they encounter, trained them to perform it, raise awareness and break the secrecy that engulfs this horrendous scourge. The play was performed in many theatres across Lebanon. That same year, Khoury directed Gibran Khalil Gibran’s The Prophet based on Henry Zghaib’s new translation, starring Rifaat Torbey on the occasion of The Prophet’s centennial anniversary.

In 2024, Khoury truly raised the bar of the theatrical scene in the SWANA region by directing and producing Physia w 3asal, an adaptation from the award winning play Constellations by Nick Payne. Khoury confirmed her expertise as a director by tackling this avant-garde script in a visually stunning and thought provoking manner. The play starred Rita Hayek and Alain Saadeh and received standing ovations in every single performance.

In television, Khoury presented two entertainment shows: El Layle Layltak On LBCI and Men El Ekhir on MTV Lebanon. She also worked as a producer for El Layle Layltak, as well as Hiya wa Houwa and The Investor with MBC in Dubai. Lina was one of the Acting coaches in Arab Casting on Abu Dhabi TV and MTV Lebanon. She also directed and produced corporate videos and video clips in her early days. In film, Khoury was one of the producers for the film Taxi El Balad directed by Daniel Joseph. She guest starred as an actress in Philippe Araktenji’s film Listen and was the script translator of Ahmad El Mehdi’s Sea of Stars.

Independently, Khoury works on various projects as a writer, artistic consultant, acting coach, and drama translator. She also participates as a jury member in theatre festivals and short film competitions.

== Theatre plays ==
Plays directed& produced by Lina Khoury
Physia w 3asal	2024
Haki Rjeil	2018
Limatha	2016
Majnoun Yehki	2013
Sar Lezem Nehki	2009
Haki Niswan	2006-2008

Plays directed by Khoury & produced by LAU
Limatha	2015
How I Learned To Drive	2014
Isha3at	2013
Mathhab	2012
Al Shaghila	2011

== Gallery ==
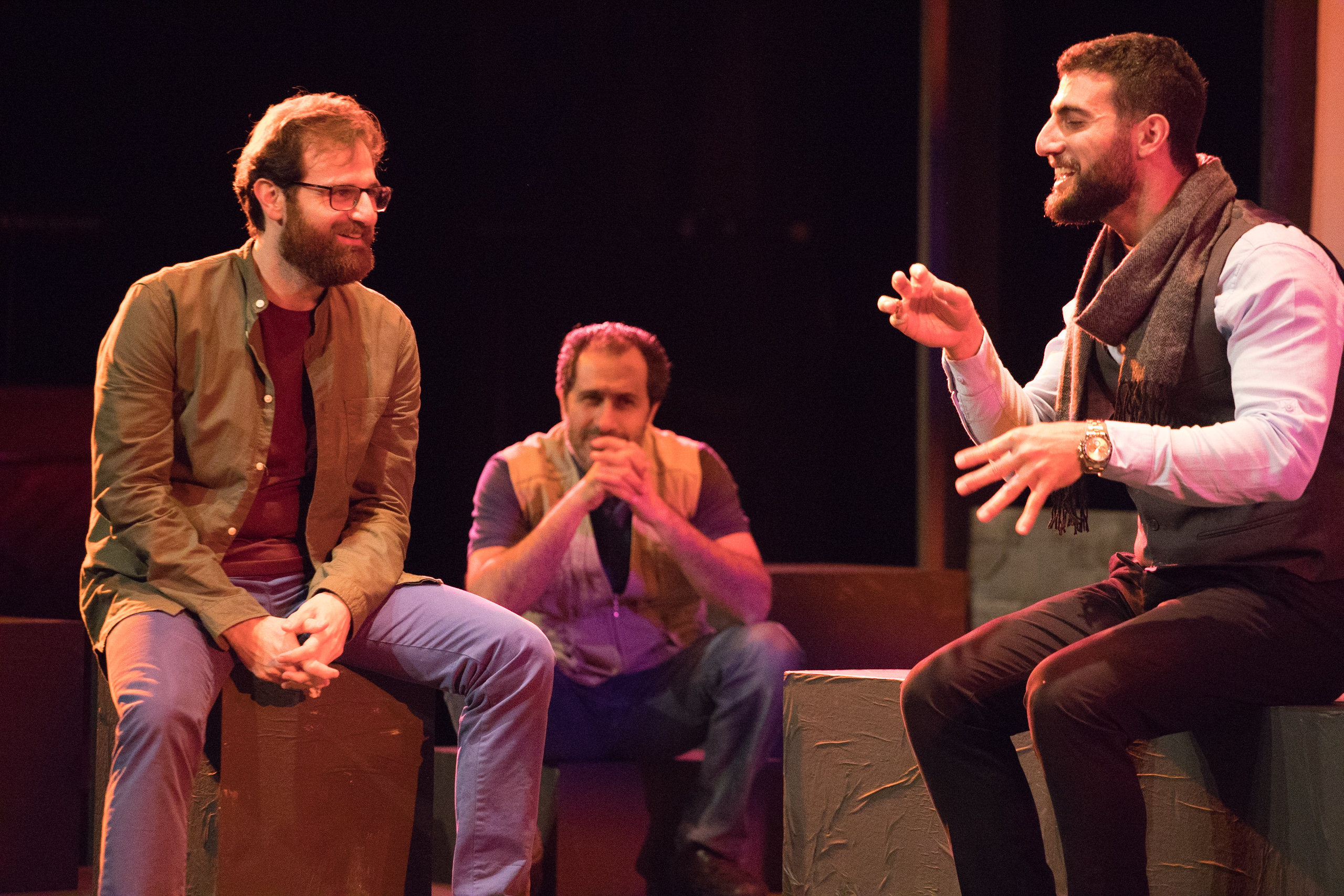

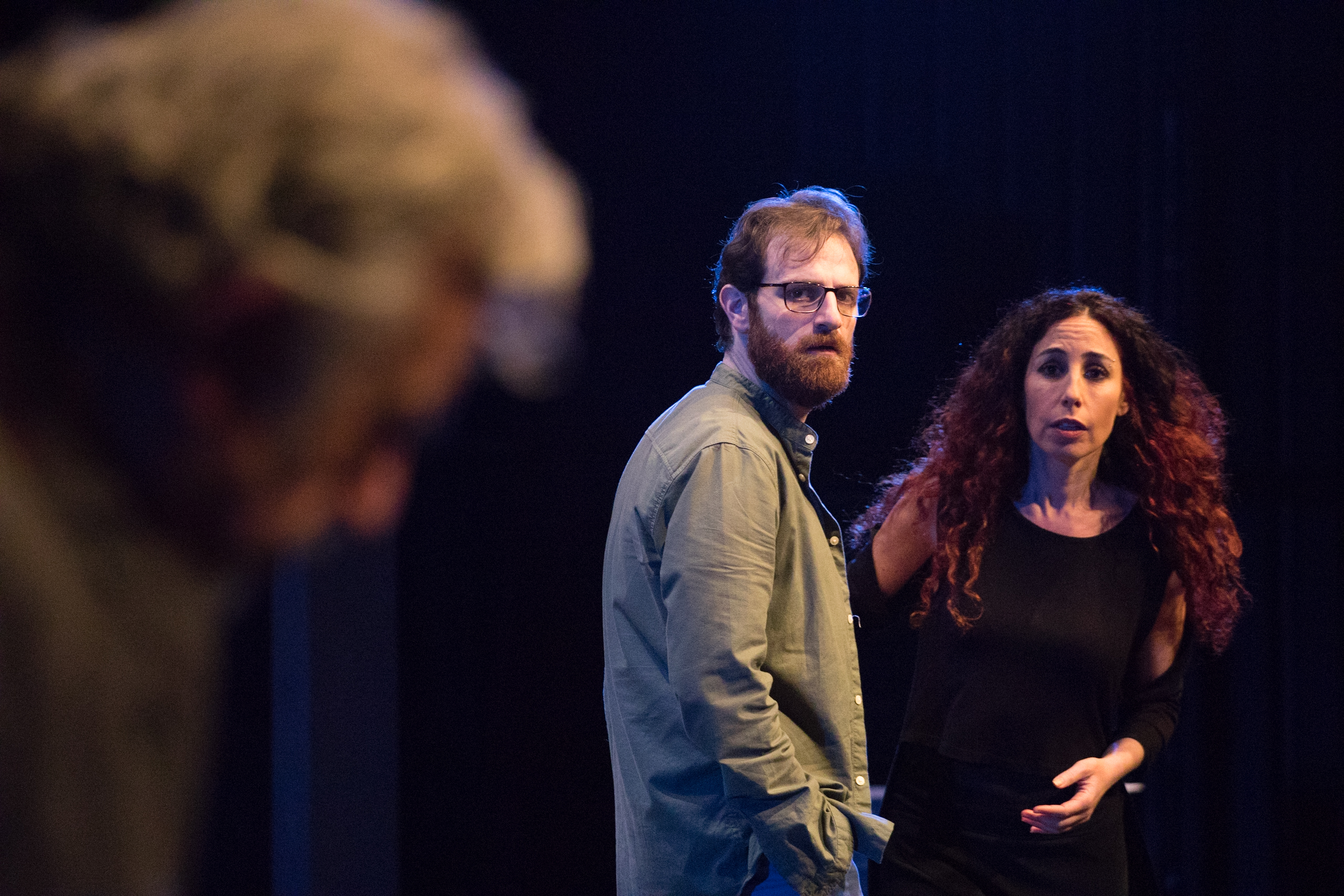

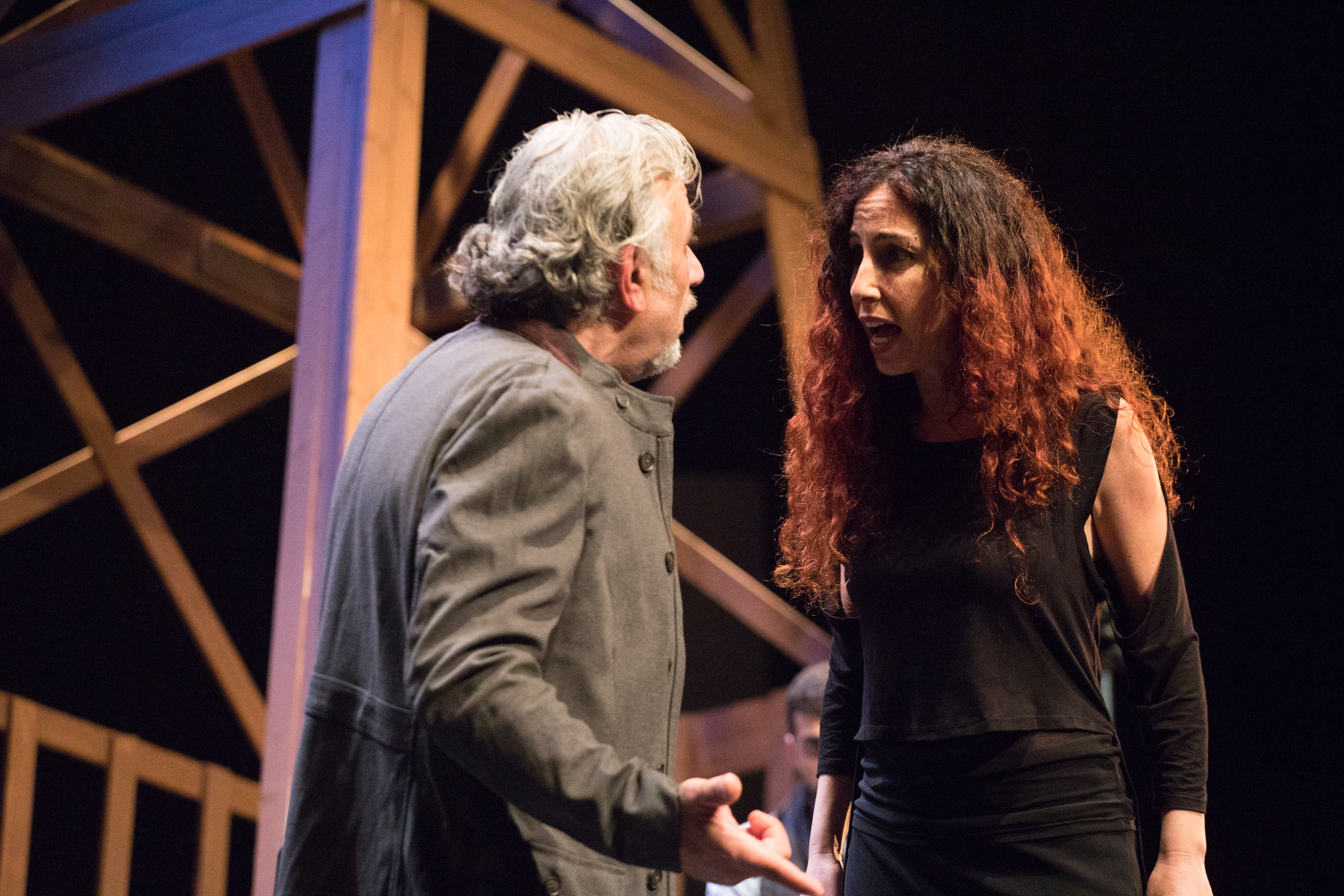

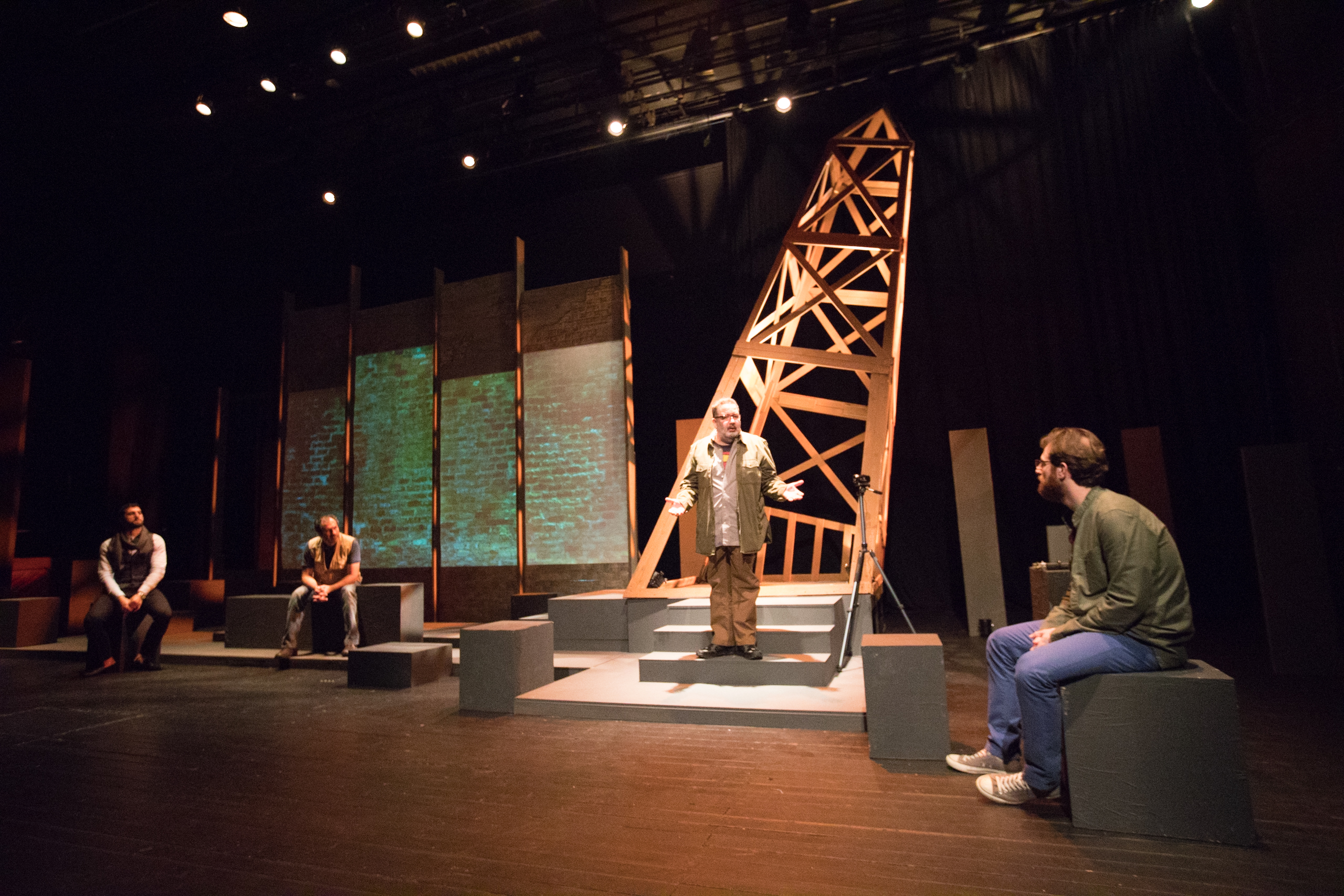

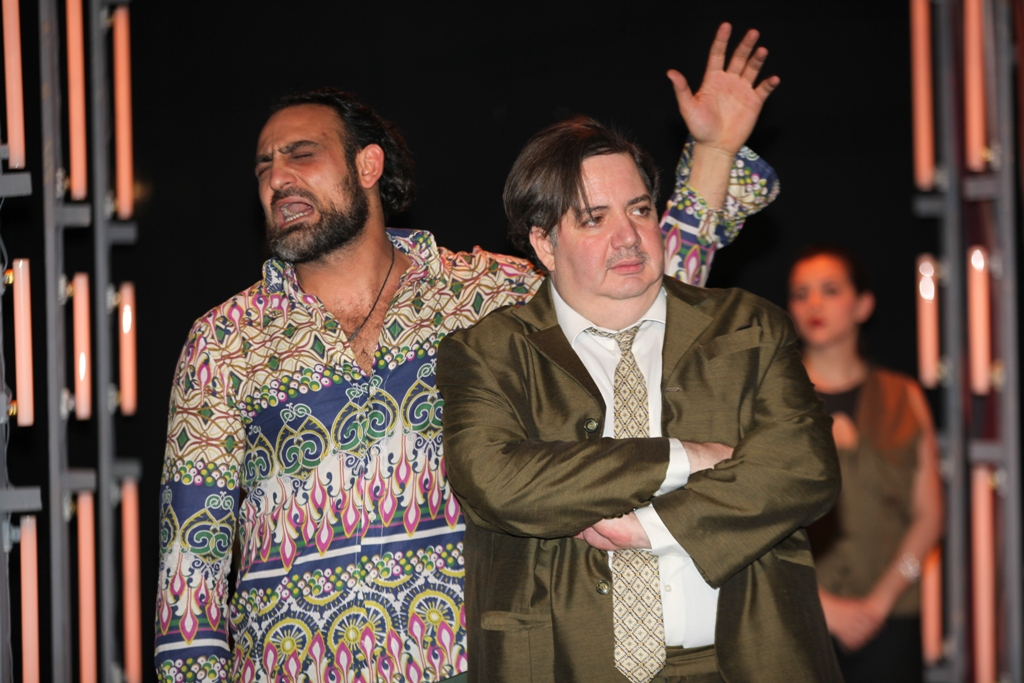

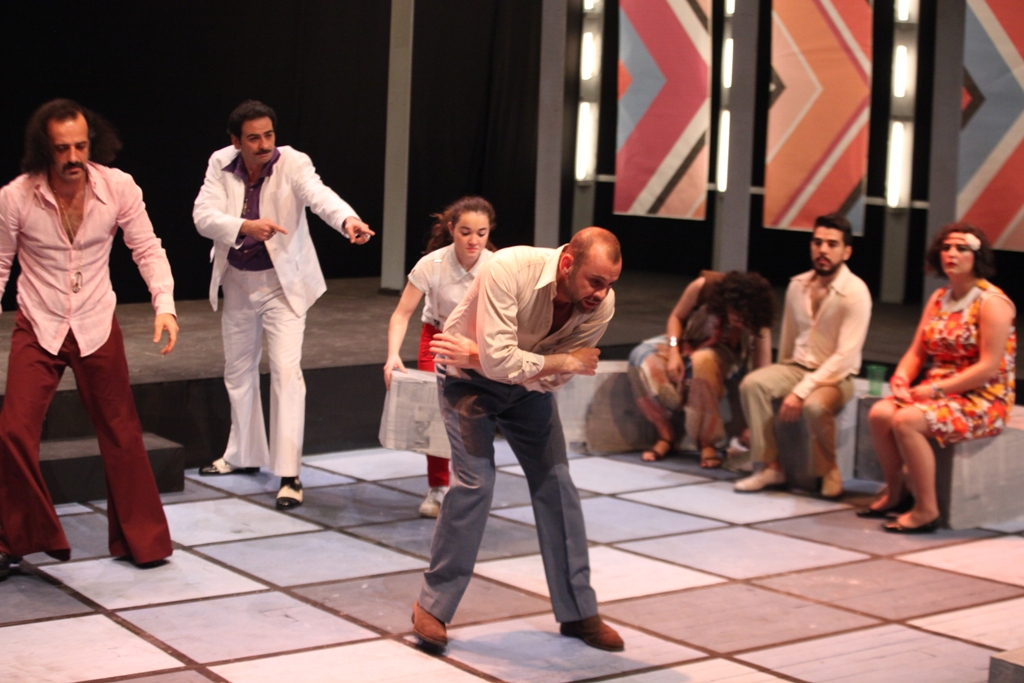

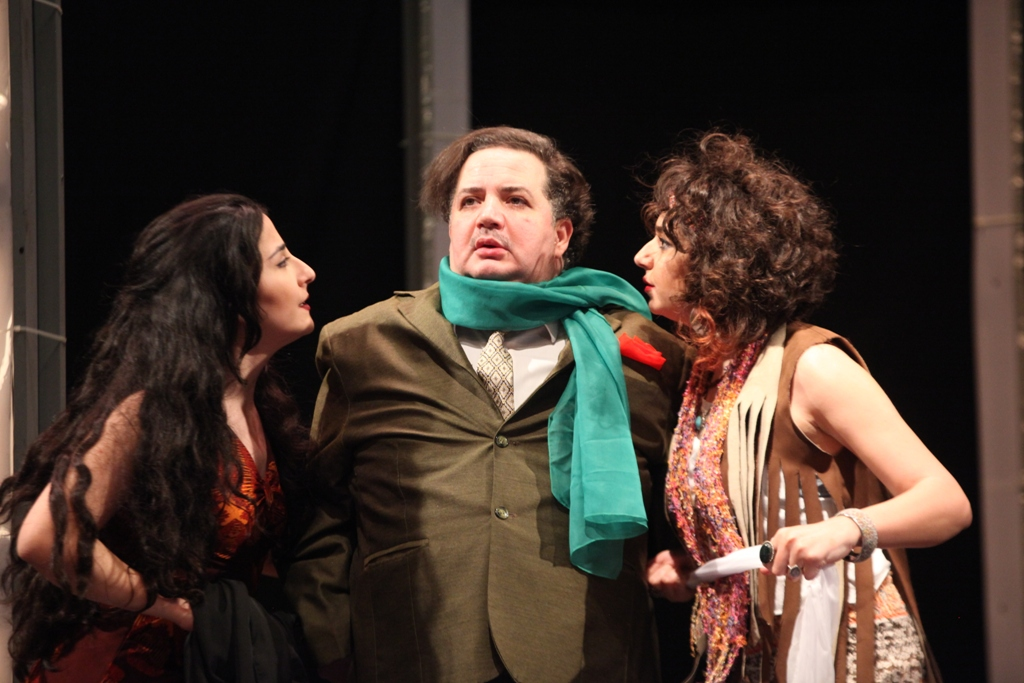

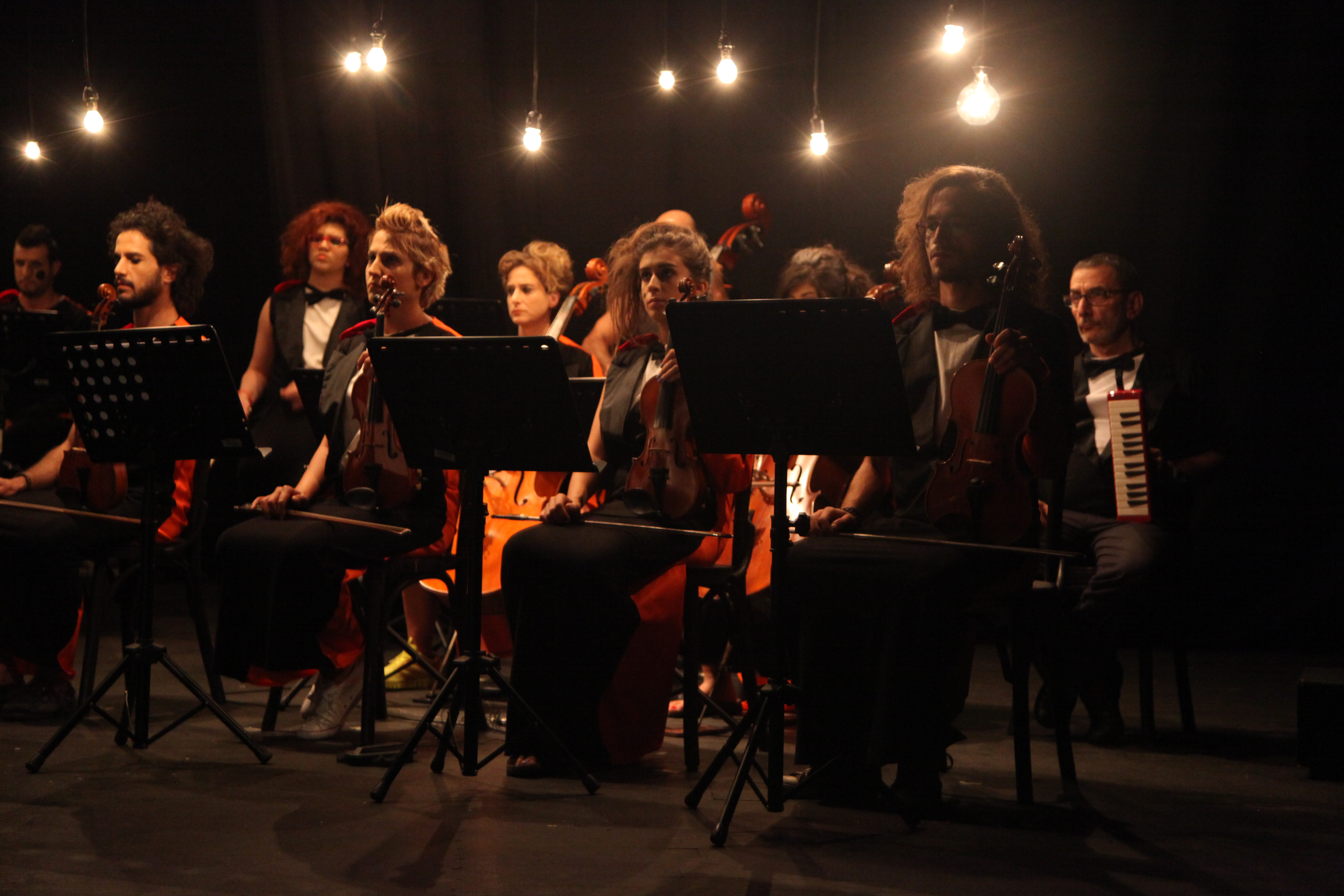

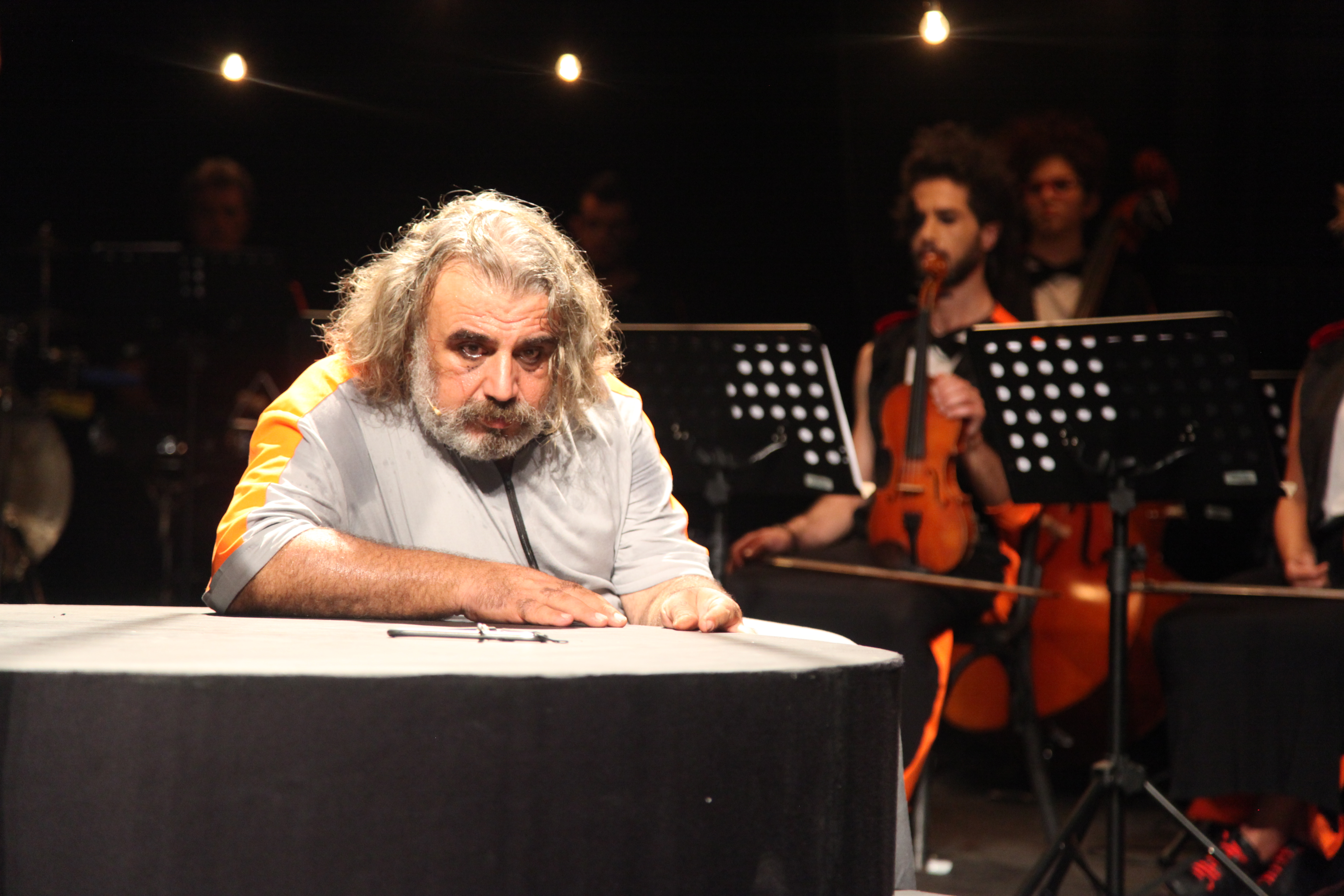

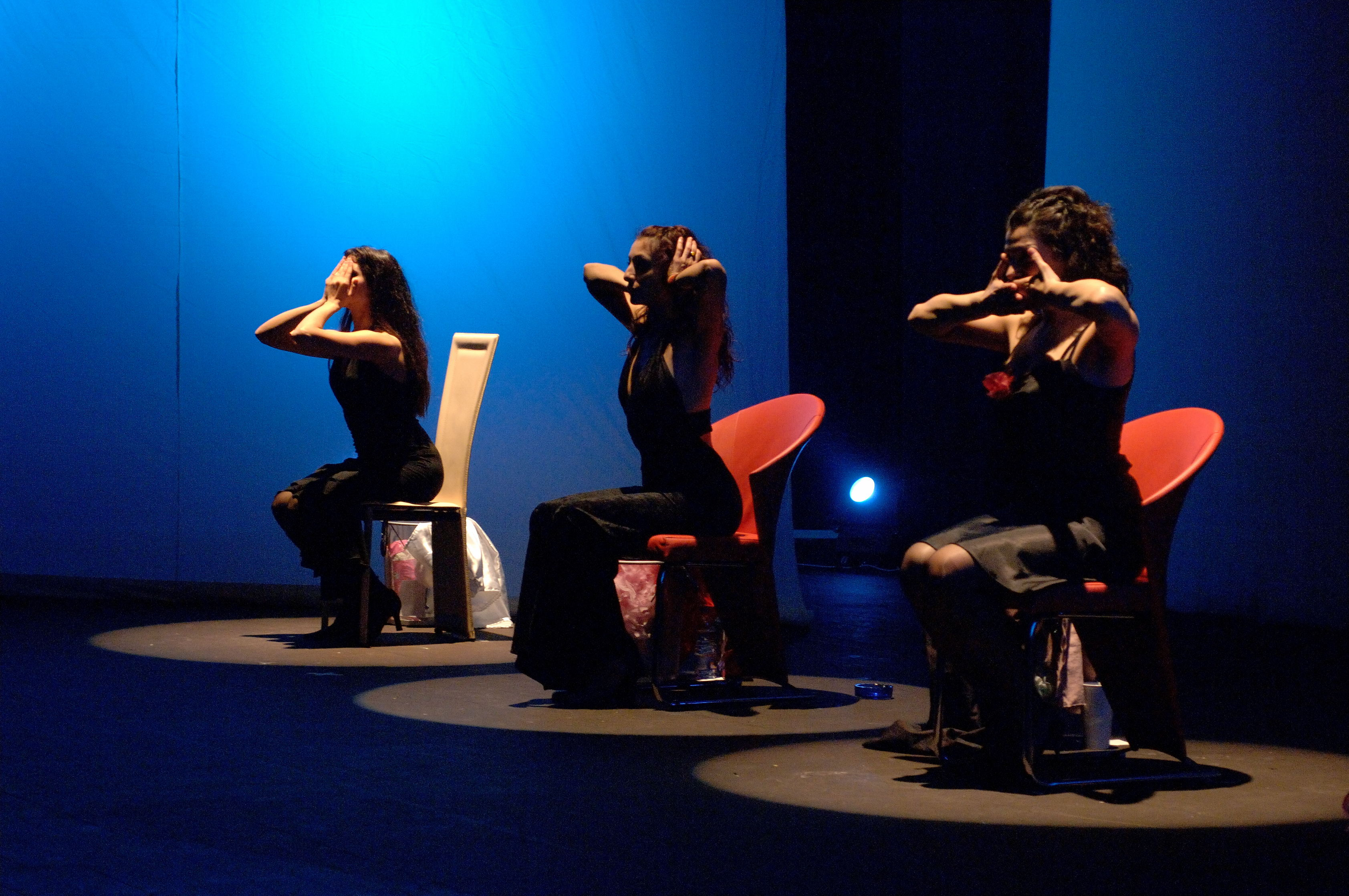

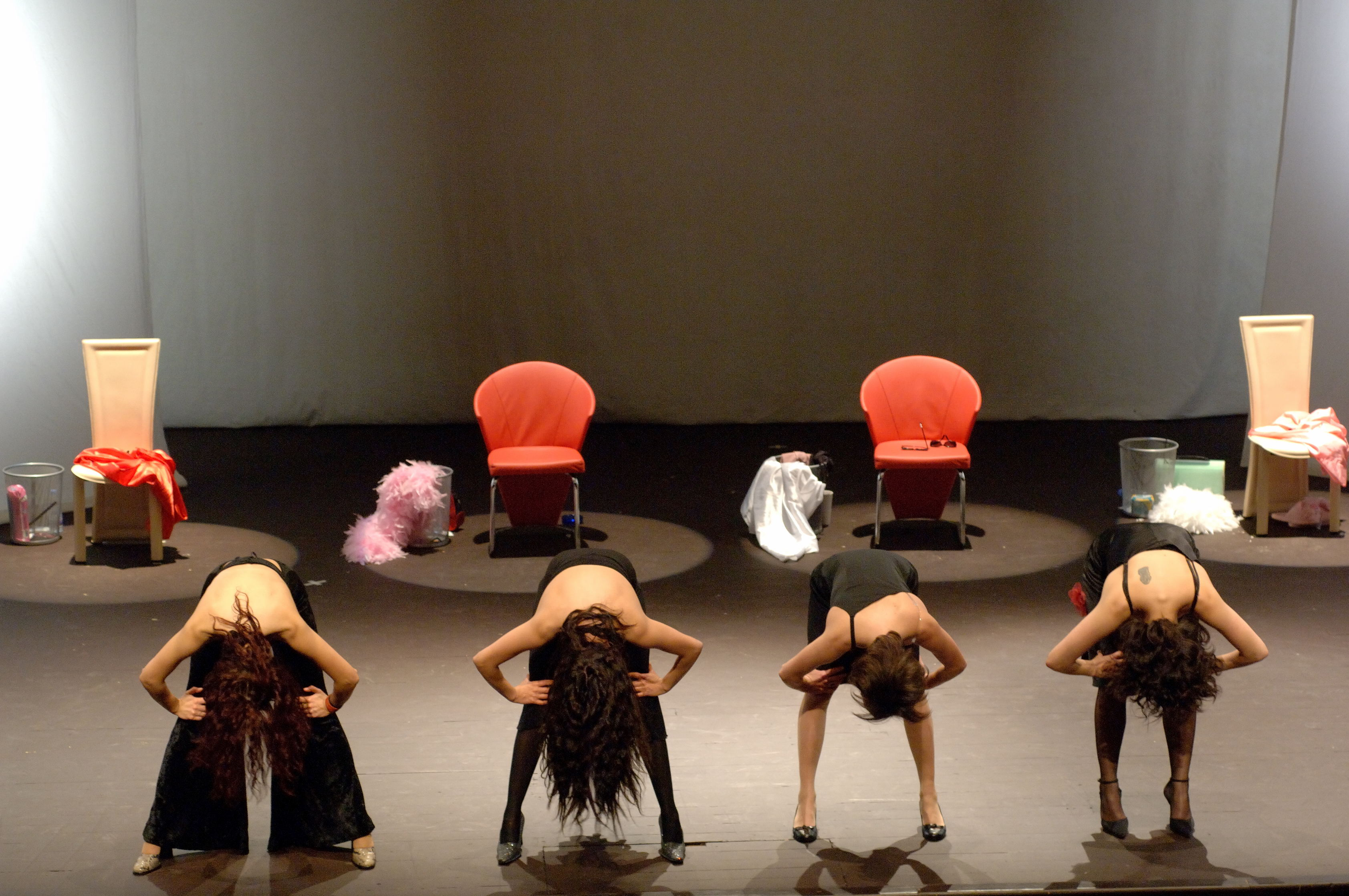

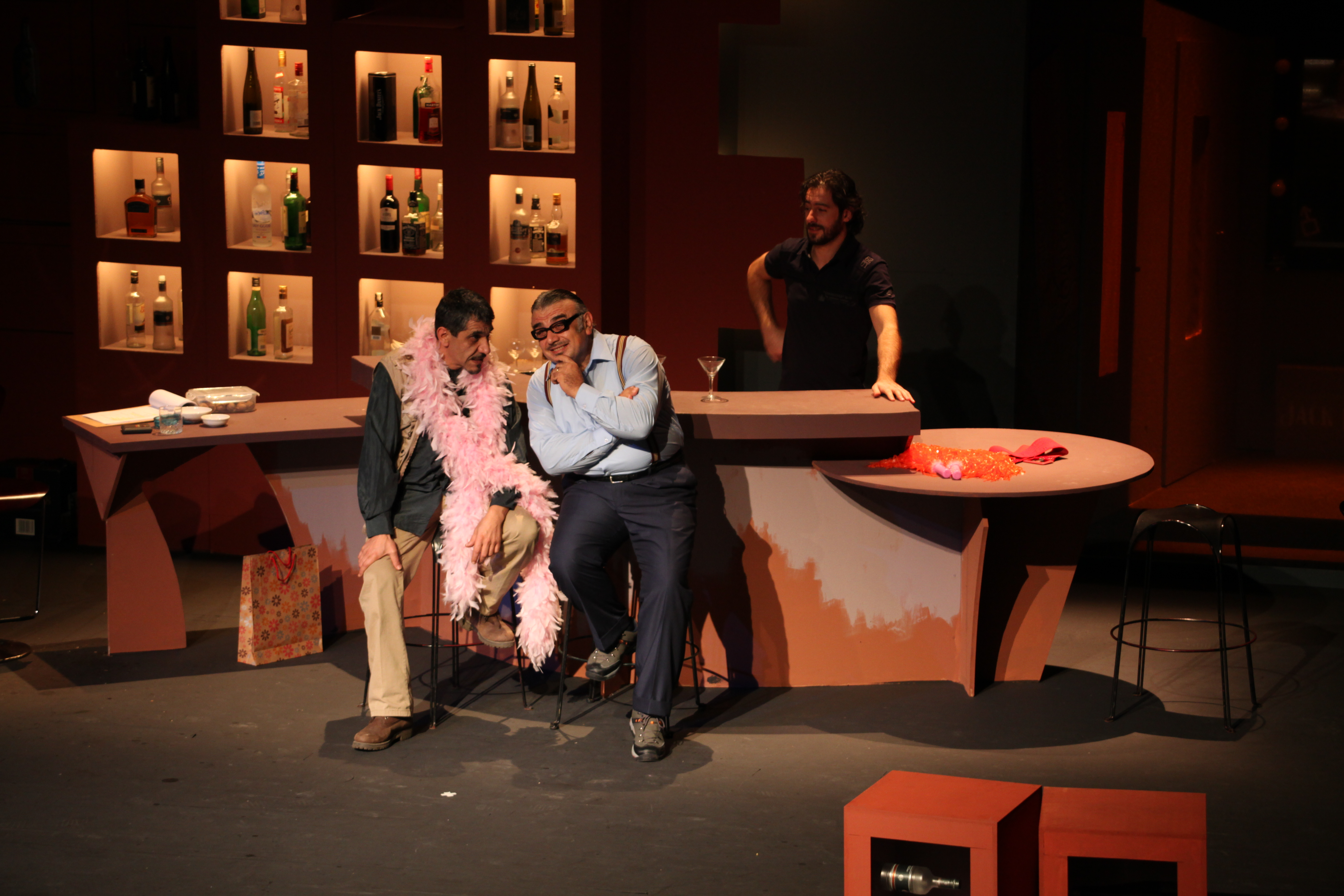

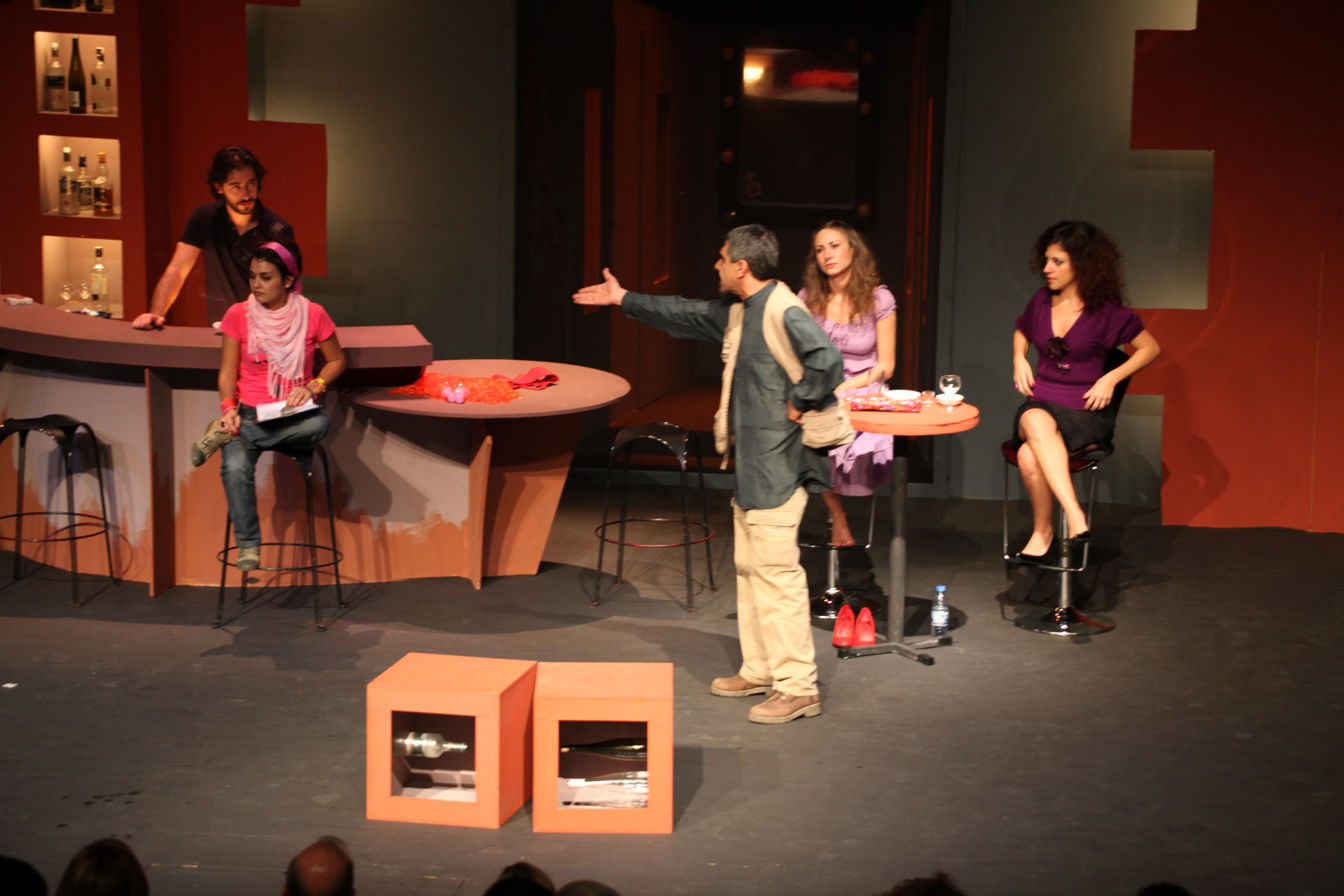

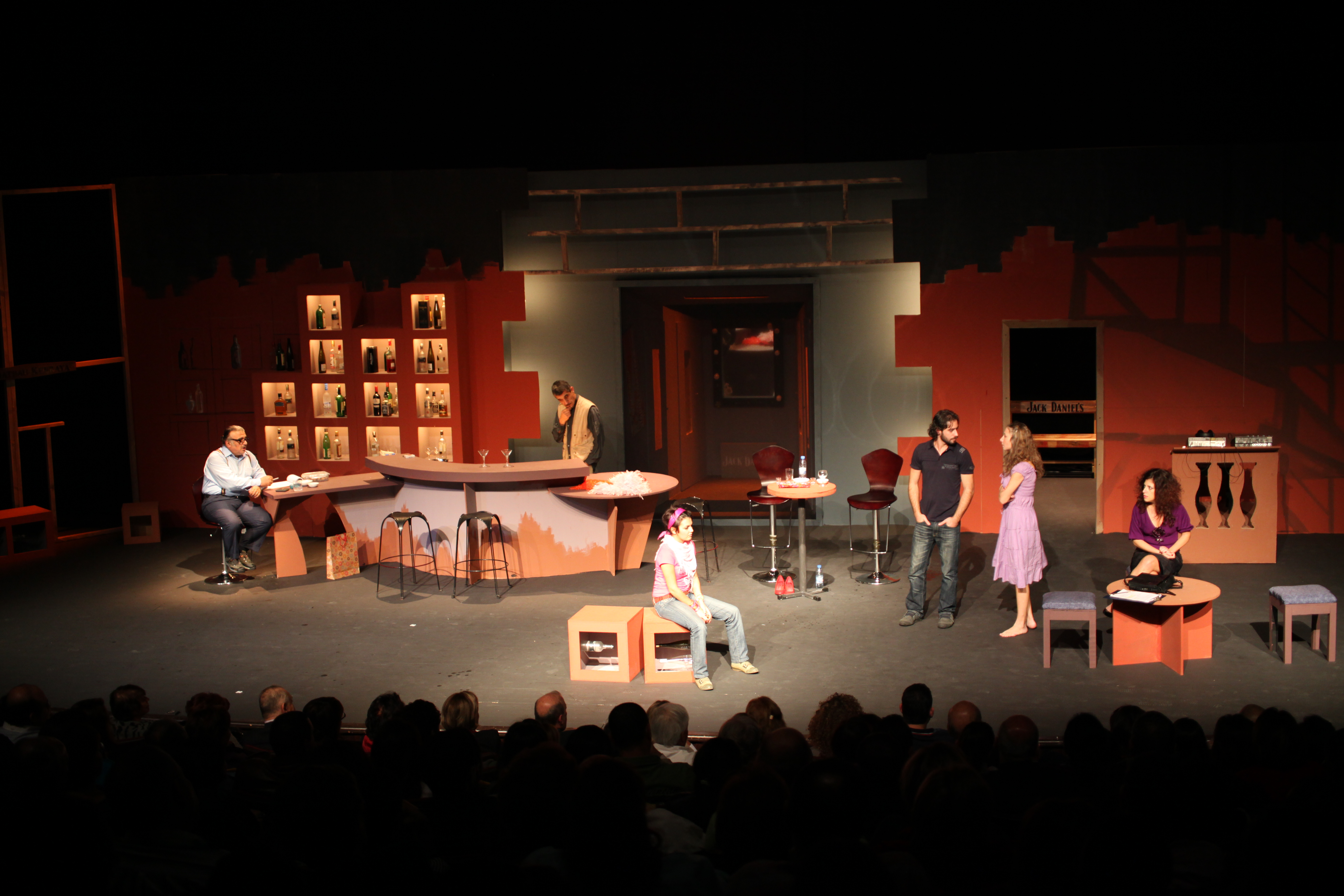
