= MBC Drama =

MBC Drama may refer to:

- Television drama series broadcast by Middle East Broadcasting Center (headquartered in Dubai, UAE)
  - MBC Drama (Middle East and North Africa)
  - MBC Plus Drama, a defunct television channel
- Television drama series broadcast by Munhwa Broadcasting Corporation in South Korea
