= Hollywood Music in Media Award for Best Original Song in a Documentary =

American media music award

- Country: United States
- Presented by: Hollywood Music in Media Awards (HMMA)
- First award: 2014
- Currently held by: Linda Perry "What Lies With You" (2026)
- Website: www.hmmawards.com

The Hollywood Music in Media Award for Best Original Song in a Documentary is one of the awards given annually to people working in the motion picture industry by the Hollywood Music in Media Awards (HMMA). It is presented to the songwriters who have composed the best "original" song, written specifically for a documentary film or series. The award was first given in 2014, during the fifth annual awards.

== Winners and nominees ==
=== 2010s ===
Year	Film	Song	Nominees
(2014); 5th
(2014); 5th	Stopping for Death: The Nurses of Wells House Hospice	"Coming Home"	Joel Martin
(2014); 5th	Hair	"Superman"	Dalal Bruchmann & Nate Jolley
(2014); 5th	Virunga	"We Will Not Go"	J. Ralph
(2015); 6th
(2015); 6th	The Hunting Ground	"Til It Happens to You"	Lady Gaga & Diane Warren
(2015); 6th	Juan Mariné, The History of Making Cinema	"Hechicero"	Pedro Contreras and Ruth Lorenzo
(2015); 6th	Meru	"The Light that Never Fails"	Lauren Christy, Andra Day & Adrian Gurvitz
(2015); 6th	Sueños de Sal	"Sueños de Sal"	Oscar Navarro
(2015); 6th	Tig	"Words"	Sharon Van Etten
(2016); 7th
(2016); 7th	Before the Flood	"A Minute to Breathe"	Trent Reznor & Atticus Ross
(2016); 7th	13th	"Letter to the Free"	Common
(2016); 7th	Audrie & Daisy	"Flicker"	Tori Amos
(2016); 7th	Jim: The James Foley Story	"The Empty Chair"	J. Ralph & Sting
(2016); 7th	MARS	"Mars"	Nick Cave & Warren Ellis
(2017); 8th
(2017); 8th	Step	"Jump"	Laura Karpman, Raphael Saadiq & Taura Stinson
(2017); 8th	The American Epic Sessions	"2 Fingers Of Whiskey"	Elton John & Bernie Taupin, and T Bone Burnett, Jack White
(2017); 8th	An Inconvenient Sequel: Truth to Power	"Truth to Power"	Ryan Tedder & T Bone Burnett
(2017); 8th	Chasing Coral	"Tell Me How Long"	Teddy Geiger & Dan Romer
(2017); 8th	Cries from Syria	"Prayers for This World"	Diane Warren
(2017); 8th	Served Like a Girl	"Dancing Through the Wreckage"	Pat Benatar, Neil Giraldo & Linda Perry
(2018); 9th
(2018); 9th	RBG	"I'll Fight"	Diane Warren
(2018); 9th	Free Solo	"Gravity"	Tim McGraw and Lori McKenna
(2018); 9th	Pope Francis: A Man of His Word	"These Are the Words"	Tony Shanahan and Patti Smith
(2018); 9th	Quincy	"Keep Reachin'"	Quincy Jones, Mark Ronson and Yebba Smith
(2018); 9th	Yo Galgo	"Song for the Untitled"	Arturo Cardelús and Rickie Lee Kroell
(2019); 10th
(2019); 10th	The Biggest Little Farm	"Sun, Flood, or Drought"	Scott Avett, Seth Avett (writers/performers)
(2019); 10th	The Arctic & Antarctica	"Frozen Song"	Milana Zilnik (writer/performer)
(2019); 10th	Bathtubs Over Broadway	"It'll Change Your Life"	Anthony DiLorenzo, Steve Young (writers); Bathtubs Over Broadway Orchestra & Session Singers (performers)
(2019); 10th	The Black Godfather	"Letter to My Godfather"	Pharrell Williams (writer/performer), Chad Hugo (writer)
(2019); 10th	The Bronx, USA	"Da Bronx"	Paul Williams, Charles Fox (writers); Robert Klein, Donald Webber Jr. (performers)
(2019); 10th	Our Planet	"In This Together"	Steven Price (writer); Ellie Goulding (performer)

=== 2020s ===
Year	Film	Song	Nominees
(2020); 11th
(2020); 11th	Giving Voice	"Never Break"	John Legend (writer/performer); Nasri Atweh, Benjamin Hudson McIldowie, Greg Wells (writers)
(2020); 11th	All In: The Fight for Democracy	"Turntables"	Janelle Monáe (writer/performer)
(2020); 11th	Belly of the Beast	"See What You've Done"	Mary J. Blige (writer/performer); Nova Wav, DJ Camper (writers)
(2020); 11th	Miss Americana	"Only the Young"	Taylor Swift (writer/performer); Joel Little (writer)
(2020); 11th	Nasrin	"How Can I Tell You?"	Lynn Ahrens, Stephen Flaherty (writers); Angélique Kidjo (performer)
(2020); 11th	The Way I See It	"The Future"	Aloe Blacc (writer/performer)
(2021); 12th
(2021); 12th	Rebel Hearts	"Secret Sister"	Rufus Wainwright (writer/performer)
(2021); 12th	Brian Wilson: Long Promised Road	"Right Where I Belong"	Brian Wilson (writer/performer), Jim James (writer)
(2021); 12th	Cured	"The Other Side of the Rainbow"	Ian Honeyman and Tucker Murray Caploe (writers/performers)
(2021); 12th	The First Wave	"Breathe"	Jon Batiste (writer/performer); Autumn Rowe and H. Scott Salinas (writers)
(2021); 12th	The Mustangs: America's Wild Horses	"(Never Gonna) Tame You"	Diane Warren (writer); Blanco Brown (performer)
(2021); 12th	World Woman Hour	"Looking Up"	Elizabeth Russo & Ryan Shore (writers); Angelica Hale (performer)
(2022); 13th
(2022); 13th	The Return of Tanya Tucker: Featuring Brandi Carlile	"Ready As I'll Never Be"	Brandi Carlile and Tanya Tucker (writers); Tanya Tucker (performer)
(2022); 13th	Selena Gomez: My Mind & Me	"My Mind and Me"	Selena Gomez, Amy Allen, Jonathan Bellion, Michael Pollack, Stefan Johnson, Jordan K Johnson (writers); Selena Gomez (performer)
(2022); 13th	The Automat	"At The Automat"	Mel Brooks (writer/performer)
(2022); 13th	Killing Me Softly with His Songs	"Sing A Brand New Song"	Charles Fox and Lonnie "Common" Rashid Lynn (writers); Donald Webber, Jr. (performer)
(2022); 13th	The Voice of Dust and Ash	"Dust and Ash"	J Ralph (writer); Norah Jones (performer)
(2022); 13th	We Are Art Through the Eyes of Annalaura	"We Are Art"	Annalaura di Luggo and Paky Di Maio (writers); Annalaura di Luggo (performer)
(2022); 13th	Wildcat	"A Sky Like I’ve Never Seen"	Robin Pecknold (writer); Fleet Foxes (performer)
(2023); 14th
(2023); 14th	With This Light	"Todo Fue Por Amor"	Carla Morrison, Juan Alejandro Jimenez Perez, and Mario Demian Jimenez Perez (writers); Carla Morrison (performer)
(2023); 14th	Bobi Wine: The People's President	"Everything Is Gonna Be Alright"	Bobi Wine (writer/performer)
(2023); 14th	Bobo & the Edge: A Sort of Homecoming with Dave Letterman	"Forty Foot Man"	Bono and the Edge (writers/performers)
(2023); 14th	Louder Than Rock	"Speechless"	Israel Houghton and Adam Ranney (writers); Caleb Quaye and Judith Hill (performers)
(2023); 14th	The Jewel Thief	"Dream Your Little Dream"	Dan Braun and Josh Braun (writers); The Braun Brothers (performers)
(2025); 16th
(2025); 16th	Diane Warren: Relentless	"Dear Me"	Diane Warren (writer); Kesha (performer)
(2025); 16th	Billy Idol Should Be Dead	"Dying to Live"	Billy Idol, J. Ralph, Steve Stevens, Tommy English, Joe Janiak (writers); Billy Idol and J. Ralph (performers)
(2025); 16th	Karol G: Tomorrow Was Beautiful	"Milagros"	Carolina Giraldo Navarro, Edgar Barrera, Kevyn Mauricio Cruz, Lenin Yorney Palacios (writers); Karol G (performer)
(2025); 16th	Come See Me in the Good Light	"Salt then Sour then Sweet"	Sara Bareilles, Andrea Gibson and Brandi Carlile (writers); Sara Bareilles and Brandi Carlile (performers)
(2026); 17th
(2026); 17th	Linda Perry: Let It Die Here	"What Lies With You"	Linda Perry (writer/performer)
(2026); 17th	Musk	"Let Me Sell You a Dream"	David Byrne and Daniel Pemberton (writers); David Byrne (performer)
(2026); 17th	Kylie	"Light Up"	Kylie Minogue, Richard Stannard, Duck Blackwell, Luke Fitton and Chris Martin (writers); Kylie Minogue (performer)
(2026); 17th	Nothing to See Here: Watts	"Stay True"	Brandon "Stix" Salaam-Bailey, Marcus Hodge, Christopher Black, Johnny McKenzie, Rosemarie Peralta and Daysha Morgan (writers); Rosemarie featuring Jay Rock (performers)
(2026); 17th	Hannah Montana 20th Anniversary Special	"Younger You"	Miley Cyrus, Michael Pollack, Stefan Johnson, Jordan K. Johnson, Gregory "Aldae" Hein and Jon Bellion (writers); Miley Cyrus (performer)

== See also ==
- Academy Award for Best Original Song
