= MBC+ Drama =

Middle-Eastern television channel launched in 2009

MBC Plus Drama
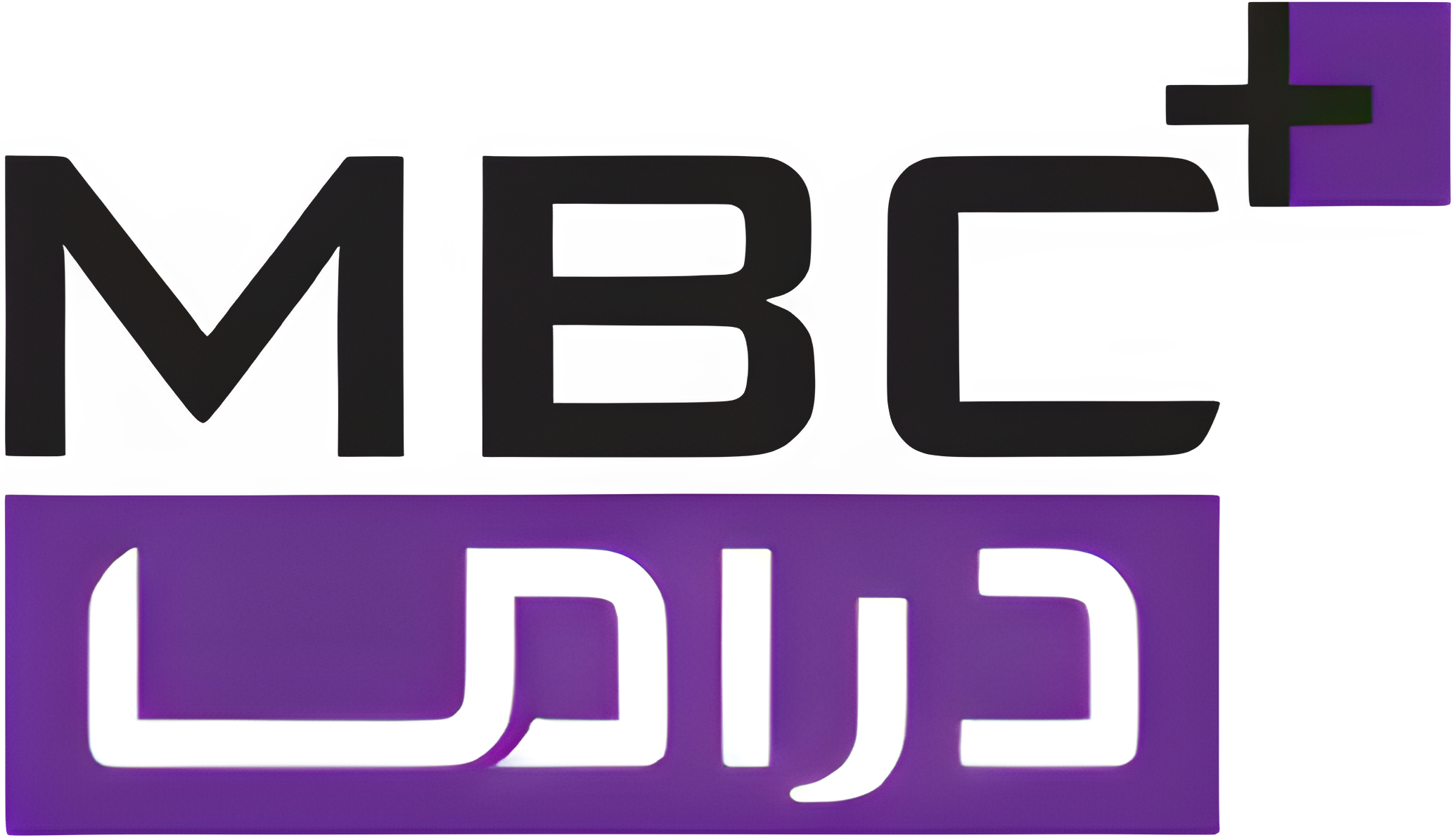
- Country: Saudi Arabia
- Broadcast area: Middle East; Maghreb
- Network: MBC Group
- Headquarters: Riyadh, Saudi Arabia

Programming
- Language: Arabic
- Picture format: 1080i (HDTV) 576i (SDTV)

Ownership
- Owner: Middle East Broadcasting Center; OSN (2009-2016)
- Sister channels: MBC 1 MBC 2 MBC 3 MBC 4 MBC Drama; MBC Action; MBC Max; MBC Persia; Al Arabiya; Wanasah; Al Hadath; MBC+ Power; MBC Variety HD; MBC Bollywood; MBC Masr; MBC Masr 2 MBC Iraq

History
- Launched: 1 February 2009; 17 years ago
- Closed: 8 January 2011 (SD); 1 January 2016 (HD)

The MBC+ Drama was a Saudi free-to-air television channel owned by MBC Group. It was a joint venture between OSN and MBC Group. It was a 24-hour Arabic channel that offers a range of Arabic series First on TV to OSN subscribers starting 1 February 2009.

MBC+ Drama claims to offer programs up to 3 months before any other channel. MBC+ Drama is the only channel among its sister channels at MBC Group that requires subscription.

On 1 January 2016, MBC + Drama HD stopped broadcasting and was replaced with an OSN Ya Hala! Cinema HD promo due to MBC focusing on an alternative free-to-air channel MBC Drama and paid on-demand service Shahid VIP.

As of October 2016, it has returned, but the logo has changed color from orange to purple and is now a pay-per-view channel with the same format as before.

== Programming ==
=== Arab world ===
- Ala Al Hilwa Wa Al Morra
- Ruby
- Bab Al-Hara
- Ramez Wakel el-Gaw
- Mawqef Micro
- Um Harun
- Al Do' El Shared
- Kalabsh
- Kalabsh season 2
- Al Thaman
- Rashash
- Kingdoms of Fire
- The Boxing Girls
- Boxing Girls
- Al Kabeer
- Zero4
- Ferqat Naji Atallah
- Raqam Majhool
- Keid Al Nesa
- Ahl al-Gharām
- Aswār
- Tash ma Tash
- Banat Al Molakama
- Gārī Yā Hammūda
- The Godfather: Club of the East
- Omar
- Al Hayba
- Sarah
- Khams Khawāt
- Stiletto
- Heera
- 04
- Beirut City
- Samra
- Game of Thrones (season 1 and 2) (dubbed in Arabic)
- Mr. Selfridge (dubbed in Arabic)
- The Tudors (season 2) (dubbed in Arabic)
- Downton Abbey (dubbed in Arabic)
- Groove High (dubbed in Arabic)
- The Simpsons (dubbed in Arabic)
- Power Rangers Super Megaforce (dubbed in Arabic)
- Amina Haf

=== Films ===
MBC+ Drama airs approximately one movie a day late at night, mostly Arabic movies.
