= Zero4 (TV series) =

2012 Arabic TV series or program

- Also known as: 04
- Genre: Drama
- Starring: Nicolas Mouawad; Mohammed Al Dosari; Mumin Noor; Khaled Najim; Aseel Omran; Babe Leila; Yamnee Tannous; Rita Hayek
- Opening theme: 04 Opening Title By Layal Watfeh
- Composer: Layal Watfeh
- Country of origin: Arab World
- Original language: Arabic w/ English subtitles
- No. of seasons: 4
- No. of episodes: 30

Production
- Producers: MBC Group; Authre production BPG group
- Production locations: Saudi Arabia, Morocco
- Running time: 20-45 minutes

Original release
- Network: MBC1
- Release: January 14, 2012 – January 16, 2013

04 is an Arabic Drama series, broadcast on MBC1. It focuses on four young people from different nationalities living under one roof, and each of them is looking forward to a particular thing some of them aspire to fame, or love, or girls and relationships. The main characters include the initial four young men Ziad Khoury (Nicolas Mouawad), Mr. Hassan (Mumin Noor), Abdul Aziz (Mohammed Al Dosari), Sam Adnan (Khaled Najm), and a friend Ziad Nadine Zahi (Yamnee Tannous), Habiba Abdul Aziz Mary (Aseel Omran), fiancee Hassan Manal (full authenticity).It was written by Egyptian screenwriter Mahmoud Dessouki and directed by Kuwaiti filmmaker Kuwaiti Khaled Marei. For the second season, Babe Leila and Rita Hayek of the main crew have been included. It was shown for the first time on MBC 1 on January 14, 2012 and presentation of the second season on May 19, 2012. It was scheduled to be a part of the third and fourth.

== Promotion ==
After viewing the first season, it was announced a new partnership with Google, and come such as the availability of this partnership opportunity for the viewer to monitor the lives of characters of the series on the Internet, and follow-up details via social networking sites, Facebook, Twitter, google + .

The promotion for the second season, he appeared Ziad, Hassan, and Sam, Abdul Aziz, the program Arab's Got Talent second season, the day before the premiere of the series.

== Crew ==
=== The main crew ===
- Nicolas Mouawad as Ziad Khoury
- Mumin Noor as Mr. Hassan Ibrahim
- Mohammed Al-Dosari as Abdul Aziz
- Khaled Najim as Wassam Adnan
- Yamnee Tannus as Nadine Zahi
- Aseel Omran as Miriam
- Victoria Boracio as Catherine
- Ruad Aliyu as Mona
- Babe Leila as Tema
- Rita Hayek as Lara

== Broadcast ==
The first season of 04 episodes will be of twenty. It has been airing the pilot episode on January 14, 2012, broadcast for 4 weeks, 5 episodes in per the week from Saturday to Wednesday at 19:00 until February 8, 2012, for a total of 20 episodes . And displays ring assembled each Thursday.

== Turnout ==
Was the first season on a high proportion of follow-up and interaction of a large audience before the youth of television viewers and Internet surfers sites and social networking own miniseries and heroes. In doing so, the action heroes of the four have been able to build friendships with a multitude of followers, and therefore add them as friends beloved to their accounts interactive Twitter and Facebook, and others, to melt the drama in the context of reality, and turns the characters dramatic virtual to real characters and realistic, in the experiment described b The first of its kind in the experiments Arabic drama. Because of the large turnout on the first season has been renewed for a second season, it is possible that there will be a third and fourth season.
