= Hannah Montana 20th Anniversary Special =

2026 television special

- Promotional poster
- Based on: Hannah Montana by Michael Poryes; Rich Correll; Barry O'Brien
- Showrunner: Ashley Edens
- Written by: Kristen Bartlett
- Directed by: Sam Wrench
- Presented by: Alex Cooper
- Starring: Miley Cyrus; Billy Ray Cyrus; Tish Cyrus-Purcell; Noah Cyrus; Selena Gomez; Chappell Roan; Jamal Sims; Gary Marsh
- Music by: Kenneth Burgomaster
- Country of origin: United States
- Original language: English

Production
- Executive producers: Miley Cyrus; Tish Cyrus-Purcell; Ashley Edens; Sam Wrench; Alex Cooper; Matt Kaplan
- Cinematography: Nyk Allen
- Running time: 58 minutes
- Production companies: Disney Branded Television; HopeTown Entertainment; Unwell Productions

Original release
- Network: Disney+
- Release: March 24, 2026

Hannah Montana 20th Anniversary Special is a 2026 television special to commemorate the 20th anniversary of the teen sitcom Hannah Montana. Hosted by Alex Cooper, it includes interviews with Miley Cyrus and special guests, as well as Cyrus's live performances. It was released on March 24, 2026 on Disney+.

== Cast ==
- Miley Cyrus
- Tish Cyrus-Purcell
- Noah Cyrus
- Billy Ray Cyrus
- Gary Marsh
- Jamal Sims
- Chappell Roan
- Selena Gomez

== Production ==
In June 2025, Miley Cyrus, who starred in the 2006 Disney Channel teen sitcom Hannah Montana, started teasing plans about celebrating its 20th anniversary. Later, she admitted that there were no plans at the time, but she was trying to convince Disney to prepare something. In December 2025, Charlie Andrews of Disney Branded Television started developing the idea. Production began in January 2026. The series's set was recreated at the Sunset Gower Studios. Cyrus's mother, Tish Cyrus-Purcell, brought out outfits, fan letters and scrapbooks from the archives. Cyrus recruited Alex Cooper, a fan of the series, to host the special. Cooper came up with the idea of opening it with the shot of Cyrus driving from Malibu to the soundstage. Since Cyrus did not want to replicate the wig she wore in the series, she dyed her hair and styled it with bangs instead.

The special was filmed in February 2026. It featured guest appearances by Tish Cyrus-Purcell, Billy Ray Cyrus, Cyrus' father who also starred in Hannah Montana, Selena Gomez, who was a guest star, and Chappell Roan. Gomez's appearance was arranged by Cooper as a surprise for Cyrus on set. The taping also included a live performance by Cyrus with invited fans in the audience. She performed "This Is the Life" and "The Best of Both Worlds" from Hannah Montana, as well as "The Climb" from Hannah Montana: The Movie. She recorded a new song titled "Younger You" for the special, and also performed it live.

On February 17, 2026, the special was announced by Disney. It was produced by HopeTown Entertainment and Unwell Productions. Ashley Edens served as showrunner, with Cyrus, Cyrus-Purcell, Cooper and Matt Kaplan as executive producers.

Mitchel Musso, who portrayed Oliver Oken in Hannah Montana, revealed that he had turned down the invitation for the special due to his disapproval of the reunion event not being set as an episode or a television film special.

== Release and marketing ==
On March 17, 2026, the special's trailer was released. On March 23, 2026, the special's premiere was held at El Capitan Theatre, featuring appearances by Cyrus and recurring cast members Jason Earles, Moisés Arias, Shanica Knowles, Anna Maria Perez de Tagle, Cody Linley, and David Archuleta. Emily Osment, who starred as Lilly Truscott in the series opposite Cyrus, was absent in the special; she later explained that this was due to her commitments to the sitcom Georgie & Mandy's First Marriage.

The special premiered on Disney+ on March 24, 2026, exactly 20 years to the day Hannah Montana premiered. Three days later, it was reported that it garnered 6.3 million views on Disney+ and Hulu, while the viewership of Hannah Montana was up ten times compared to the week before.

== Awards ==
Award	Date of ceremony	Category	Nominee(s)	Result	Ref.
Hollywood Music in Media Awards	November 18, 2026	Best Original Song – Documentary Film	"Younger You" – Miley Cyrus	Nominated	
Hollywood Music in Media Awards	November 18, 2026	Best Music Documentary/Special Program	Hannah Montana 20th Anniversary Special	Nominated	
