= Layal Watfeh =

Syrian composer (born 1980)

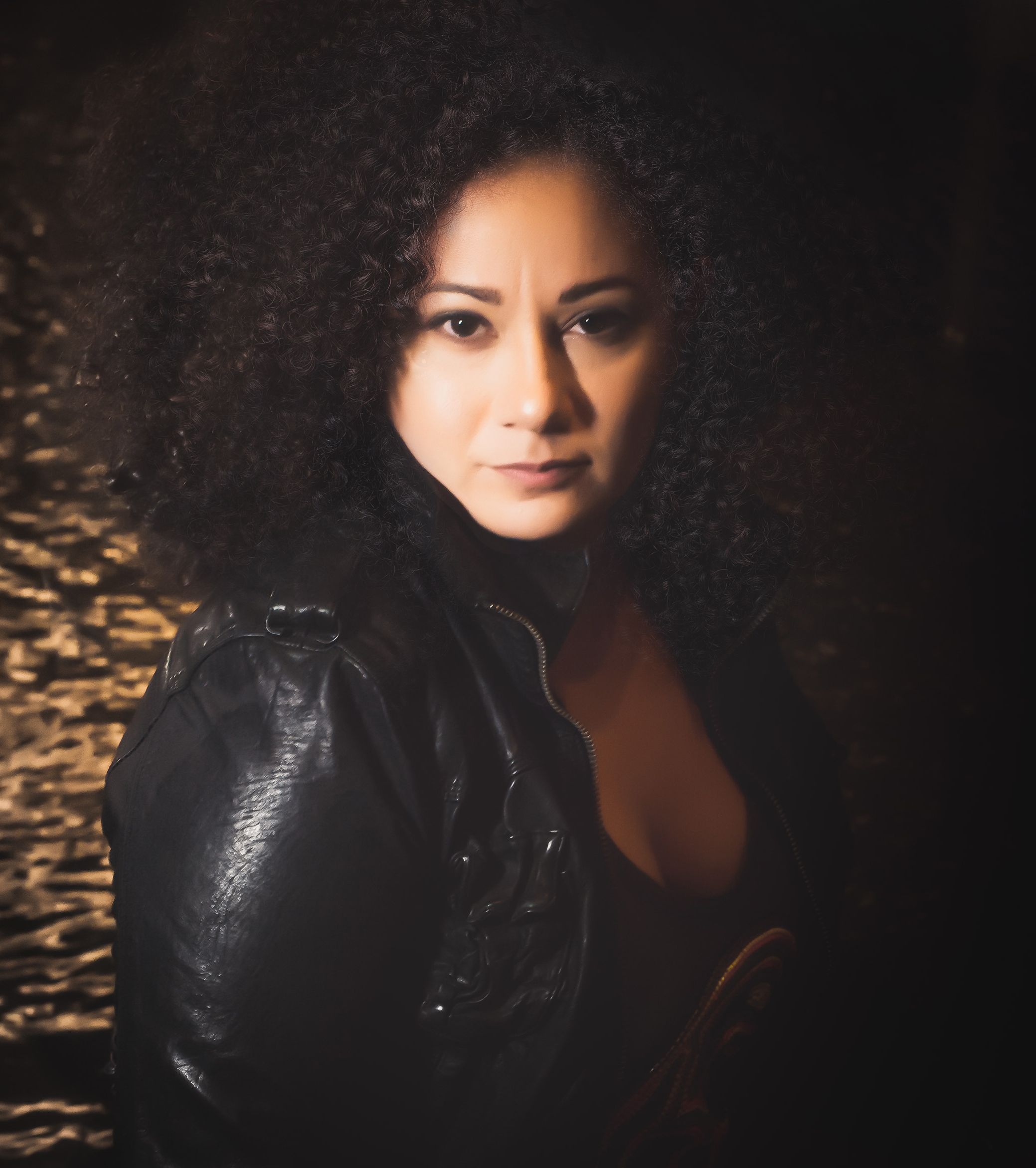

Background information
- Born: February 14, 1980 (age 46); Damascus, Syria
- Genres: Film score, classical, commercial, instrumental
- Occupations: Composer, musician, voice actor
- Years active: 2002–present

Layal Watfeh (born February 14, 1980) is a Syrian composer, musician, and voice actor. Watfeh's work primarily consists of original film score for commercials, television, and film. Over two decades of work, Watfeh has won numerous international awards for her voice acting and original scores for television and film. Her style incorporates symphonic, orchestral tones as well as traditional Arab sounds. She has worked with major companies composing commercial music, including past clients such as Olay, T.G.I. Friday's, and Krispy Kreme. Besides recording music, she has also been a voice on many TV networks across the Middle East, such as MBC2, MBC4, OSN, Abu Dhabi TV, DMTV. Watfeh currently lives in Dubai.

== Early life ==
Watfeh was born in Damascus, Syria, where she began exploring her interest in music at a young age. She entered the music conservatoire in Damascus to learn the violin at nine years old, though later that year, she moved to Dubai with her family. At 11, she turned her attention to the piano for two years, and by 17 Watfeh was recording voice-overs for TV and radio commercials. After working in numerous music studios in Dubai, Watfeh began composing original music.

== Career ==
Watfeh's career in music began in 2002 when MBC Group offered her a job as a post-production sound engineer, sound designer, and music composer. Watfeh accepted the job, and after six years she was named the senior manager of her branch. Meanwhile, Watfeh was active in the music industry as she sang the lead vocals with Abali on their album "Lemonada"" in 2004.

Watfeh left MBC in 2009 to create her own studio and begin composing music. She was drawn to a variety of media, including advertisements, TV series, documentaries, short films, and feature films, and she found work across the Middle East, the United States, Canada, and the UK. Watfeh was invited to Berlinale Talents 2014 in Berlin, Germany; she was one of approximately 300 invitees that year

In 2016, Watfeh signed a contract with scoreAscore in Los Angeles as a composer, where she has been writing scores for various American companies.

== Awards ==
Year	Event	Nominations	Result
2006	Promax Awards-World	Best Sound Design	Gold
2007	Promax Awards-Asia	Best Sound Design	Silver
2007	Promax Awards-Arabia	Best Sound Design	Silver
2011	The New York Festivals	Best Original Music (Tears for Rain)	Bronze
2011	The New York Festivals	Best Narration (Road of Death)	Bronze
2015	US International Film & Video Festival	Best Original Music (Tide of Grief)	Silver
2016	Hollywood Music in Media Awards	Best Music in a Trailer (Slums of India)	Winner
2017	Cairo Film Society Festival	Best Original Main Title Theme Music	Winner
2017	Hollywood Music in Media Awards	Best Music in a Trailer	Nominee
2022	Canadian Screen Music Awards	Best Original Main Title Theme Music	Winner

== Television and filmography ==
Year	Film/TV Show	Role
2007	The Strange Case of Salman abd al Haqq	Composer
2008	A Journey to Tripoli	Composer
2010	Baram and Hamza	Composer
2010	Butterflies of Trip City	Composer
2010	A Journey to Tripoli	Composer
2011	Abandoned Memories	Voice Actor/Sound Editor
2011	The Road of Death	Composer/Sound Editor
2011	Acid	Composer
2012	04	Composer
2013	I Hugged the Berlin Patient	Sound Mixer
2013	Moga Harra ("Heat Wave")	Composer
2014	Thakira Min Waraq	Composer
2014	Burkan Naem	Composer
2014	Second Chance	Composer
2015	Hob Walaken	Composer
2015	Kaeb Alee	Composer
2015	Abu Mohammad	Composer
2015	Nawara	Composer
2015	Before the Summer Crowd	Composer
2016	Motel Fin de la Route	Composer
2016	Baab al Reeh	Composer
2016	Khiyanat Watan	Composer
2016	Slums of India	Composer
2017	Photocopy	Composer
2017	The Black Day	Composer
2017	Love Without Boarders	Composer
