= List of RWBY soundtracks =

The following is a list of soundtracks from the animated web series RWBY, created by Monty Oum, which premiered on the Rooster Teeth website on July 18, 2013, and is currently ongoing. The music for RWBY has been composed primarily by Jeff Williams, with additional composition by Steve Goldshein, Mason Lieberman, and Alex Abraham. Williams was a member of the band Trocadero, who created the music for Rooster Teeth's Red vs. Blue, and would independently compose the eighth, ninth, and tenth seasons of the series. Other artists featured in the soundtracks include Williams' daughter, Casey Lee Williams (since she was 13), as well as Lamar Hall, Adrienne Cowan, Dawn M. Bennett, and Caleb Hyles.

== Volume 1 ==
RWBY: Volume 1 (Music from the Rooster Teeth Series)

Soundtrack album by Jeff Williams
- Released: November 12, 2013
- Genre: Film score; rock
- Label: Rooster Teeth Productions
- Producer: Jeff Williams

Jeff Williams chronology
Red vs. Blue: Season 10 (2012)	RWBY: Vol. 1 (2013)	RWBY: Vol. 2 (2014)

Singles from RWBY: Volume 1
- 1. "Red Like Roses"; 2. "Mirror Mirror"; 3. "From Shadows"; 4. "I Burn"; 5. "This Will Be the Day"; 6. "EP 1 Score – Ruby Rose"; 7. "Red Like Roses Part II"; 8. "Gold"

RWBY: Volume 1 (Music from the Rooster Teeth Series) was released on November 12, 2013. It includes the songs used in the trailers, the intro to the series' episodes, and also the score music to each episode. The soundtrack also contained previously unreleased songs such as "I May Fall" and "Wings". These songs were, however, briefly played at the end of various episodes.

Volume 1 reached number one on iTunes, beating out the movie soundtrack to The Hunger Games: Catching Fire. The soundtrack reached number 22 on Billboard's Top Rock Albums charts.

All tracks are written by Jeff Williams, except where noted.

No.	Title	Writer(s)	Length
1.	"This Will Be the Day" (feat. Casey Lee Williams)		3:08
2.	"Red Like Roses (Red Trailer)" (feat. Casey Lee Williams)		3:12
3.	"Mirror Mirror (White Trailer)" (feat. Casey Lee Williams)		2:54
4.	"From Shadows (Black Trailer)" (feat. Casey Lee Williams)		4:48
5.	"I Burn (Yellow Trailer)" (feat. Casey Lee Williams)		5:30
6.	"Gold" (feat. Casey Lee Williams)		4:02
7.	"I Burn" (feat. Casey Lee Williams & Lamar Hall)		3:11
8.	"I May Fall" (feat. Casey Lee Williams)		4:03
9.	"Red Like Roses – Part II" (feat. Casey Lee Williams & Sandy Casey)		4:02
10.	"I Burn Remix" (feat. Casey Lee Williams)		3:07
11.	"From Shadows" (feat. Casey Lee Williams)		5:21
12.	"Wings" (feat. Casey Lee Williams)		5:11
13.	"EP 1 Score – Ruby Rose"		8:37
14.	"EP 2 Score – The Shining Beacon, Pt. 1"		3:31
15.	"EP 3 Score – The Shining Beacon, Pt. 2"		4:39
16.	"EP 4 Score – The First Step, Pt. 1"		2:59
17.	"EP 5 Score – The First Step, Pt. 2"	J. Williams; Steve Goldshein	2:36
18.	"EP 6 Score – The Emerald Forest, Pt. 1"	J. Williams; Goldshein	4:24
19.	"EP 7 Score – The Emerald Forest, Pt. 2"		3:01
20.	"EP 8 Score – Players and Pieces"	J. Williams; Alex Abraham	7:25
21.	"EP 9 Score – The Badge and the Burden, Pt. 1"	J. Williams; Abraham	3:02
22.	"EP 10 Score – The Badge and the Burden, Pt. 2"	J. Williams; Abraham	2:36
23.	"EP 11 Score – Jaunedice, Pt. 1"	J. Williams; Goldshein	1:26
24.	"EP 12 Score – Jaunedice, Pt. 2"	J. Williams; Goldshein	6:05
25.	"EP 13 Score – Forever Fall, Pt. 1"	J. Williams; Abraham	2:34
26.	"EP 14 Score – Forever Fall, Pt. 2"	J. Williams; Goldshein	4:59
27.	"EP 15 Score – The Stray"	J. Williams; Abraham	6:55
28.	"EP 16 Score – Black and White"	Goldshein; Abraham; J. Williams	11:07
Total length:			2:04:24

== Volume 2 ==
RWBY: Volume 2 (Music from the Rooster Teeth Series)

Soundtrack album by Jeff Williams
- Released: December 2, 2014
- Genre: Film score; rock
- Label: Rooster Teeth Productions
- Producer: Jeff Williams

Jeff Williams chronology
RWBY: Vol. 1 (2013)	RWBY: Vol. 2 (2014)	RWBY: Vol. 3 (2016)

Singles from RWBY: Volume 2
- 1. "Time to Say Goodbye"

RWBY: Volume 2 (Music from the Rooster Teeth Series) was released on December 2, 2014. The soundtrack reached number 6 on Billboard's Hard Rock Albums.

No.	Title	Writer(s)	Length
1.	"Time to Say Goodbye"	Jeff Williams; Casey Lee Williams	3:24
2.	"Die"	J. Williams; C. Williams	3:18
3.	"Shine"	J. Williams; C. Williams	4:19
4.	"Dream Come True"	J. Williams; C. Williams	4:12
5.	"Caffeine" (feat. Lamar Hall)	J. Williams; C. Williams	3:09
6.	"All Our Days"	J. Williams; C. Williams	4:36
7.	"Boop"	J. Williams; C. Williams	3:25
8.	"Sacrifice"	J. Williams; C. Williams	4:00
9.	"This Will Be the Day" (Acoustic)	J. Williams; C. Williams	3:17
10.	"Time to Say Goodbye" (James Landino's Beach Bae Remix)	J. Williams; C. Williams	3:19
11.	"This Will Be the Day" (James Landino's Magical Girl Remix)	J. Williams; C. Williams	3:03
12.	"Best Day Ever"	J. Williams; Alex Abraham	9:27
13.	"Welcome to Beacon"	Abraham; Steve Goldshein; J. Williams	4:52
14.	"A Minor Hiccup"	Abraham; Goldshein; J. Williams	3:59
15.	"Painting the Town...."	J. Williams; Goldshein	7:59
16.	"Extracurricular"	J. Williams; Abraham	5:34
17.	"Burning the Candle"	J. Williams; Abraham	5:15
18.	"Dance Dance Infiltration"	J. Williams; Abraham	5:02
19.	"Field Trip"	Abraham; Goldshein; J. Williams	4:27
20.	"Search and Destroy"	Abraham; Goldshein; J. Williams	10:04
21.	"Mountain Glenn"	Abraham; Goldshein; J. Williams	5:59
22.	"No Brakes"	Abraham; Goldshein; J. Williams	9:19
23.	"Breach"	J. Williams; Abraham	3:36
Total length:			1:55:35

== Volume 3 ==
RWBY: Volume 3 (Music from the Rooster Teeth Series)

Soundtrack album by Jeff Williams
- Released: May 3, 2016
- Genre: Film score; rock
- Label: Rooster Teeth Productions
- Producer: Jeff Williams

Jeff Williams chronology
RWBY: Vol. 2 (2014)	RWBY: Vol. 3 (2016)	RWBY: Vol. 4 (2017)

RWBY: Volume 3 (Music from the Rooster Teeth Series) was released on May 3, 2016. The album reached number 5 on the Billboard's Hard Rock Albums chart, and number 12 on the Top Rock Albums chart.

All tracks are written by Jeff Williams, except where noted.

No.	Title	Writer(s)	Length
1.	"When It Falls" (feat. Casey Lee Williams)		3:25
2.	"I'm the One" (feat. Casey Lee Williams)		3:41
3.	"It's My Turn" (feat. Casey Lee Williams)		4:27
4.	"Not Fall in Love with You"		3:49
5.	"Neon" (feat. Casey Lee Williams)		2:54
6.	"Mirror Mirror, Pt. II" (feat. Casey Lee Williams)		3:59
7.	"Divide" (feat. Casey Lee Williams)		3:40
8.	"Cold" (feat. Casey Lee Williams)		3:26
9.	"Time to Say Goodbye (Acoustic)" (feat. Casey Lee Williams)		5:29
10.	"It's My Turn (James Landino Remix)" (feat. Casey Lee Williams)		3:47
11.	"Qrow vs Winter"		2:41
12.	"R.W.B.Y. vs F.N.K.I."		4:11
13.	"S.S.S.N. vs N.D.G.O."	J. Williams; Alex Abraham	3:37
14.	"When It Falls (V.S.Q.)"		2:00
15.	"World of Remnant 1"	J. Williams; Abraham	2:00
16.	"World of Remnant 2"	J. Williams; Abraham	2:02
17.	"World of Remnant 3"	J. Williams; Abraham	2:35
18.	"World of Remnant 4"	J. Williams; Abraham	6:00
19.	"Round One"		5:04
20.	"New Challengers..."	J. Williams; Abraham	5:04
21.	"It's Brawl in the Family"	J. Williams; Abraham	4:19
22.	"Lessons Learned"	Abraham; Steve Goldshein; J. Williams	3:55
23.	"Never Miss a Beat"	Abraham; Goldshein; J. Williams	1:51
24.	"Fall"	J. Williams; Abraham	6:33
25.	"Beginning of the End"	Abraham; Goldshein; J. Williams	5:37
26.	"Destiny"	J. Williams; Abraham	7:47
27.	"PvP"	Abraham; Goldshein; J. Williams	8:53
28.	"Battle of Beacon"	Abraham; Goldshein; J. Williams	8:29
29.	"Heroes and Monsters"	Abraham; Goldshein; J. Williams	9:53
30.	"End of the Beginning"	J. Williams; Abraham	10:29
Total length:			2:21:37

== Volume 4 ==
RWBY: Volume 4 (Music from the Rooster Teeth Series)

Soundtrack album by Jeff Williams
- Released: July 16, 2017
- Genre: Film score; rock
- Label: Rooster Teeth Productions
- Producer: Jeff Williams

Jeff Williams chronology
RWBY: Vol. 3 (2016)	RWBY: Vol. 4 (2017)	RWBY: Vol. 5 (2018)

RWBY: Volume 4 (Music from the Rooster Teeth Series) was released on June 16, 2017. The album reached number 79 on the Billboard 200. It also appeared on the magazine's other album charts, with number 5 on Independent Albums, number 6 on Hard Rock Albums, and number 18 on Top Rock Albums.

All tracks are written by Jeff Williams, except where noted.

No.	Title	Writer(s)	Length
1.	"Let's Just Live" (feat. Casey Lee Williams)		4:58
2.	"Like Morning Follows Night" (feat. Casey Lee Williams & Lamar Hall)		4:54
3.	"Bad Luck Charm"		3:37
4.	"This Life is Mine" (feat. Casey Lee Williams)		5:14
5.	"Home" (feat. Casey Lee Williams)		5:32
6.	"Armed and Ready" (feat. Casey Lee Williams)		5:14
7.	"Lusus Naturae"		4:24
8.	"Bmblb" (feat. Casey Lee Williams)		3:20
9.	"Boop (Acoustic Version)" (feat. Casey Lee Williams & Videri String Quartet)		3:24
10.	"Sacrifice (Harry Lodes Remix)" (feat. Casey Lee Williams)		4:18
11.	"I May Fall (Harry Lodes Remix)" (feat. Casey Lee Williams)		4:05
12.	"Ruby vs the Beringel"		4:30
13.	"Chapter 1 – The Next Step, Pt. 1"	J. Williams; Alex Abraham	3:36
14.	"Chapter 1 – The Next Step, Pt. 2"	J. Williams; Abraham	4:23
15.	"Chapter 1 – The Next Step, Pt. 3"	J. Williams; Abraham	3:58
16.	"Chapter 2 – Remembrance, Pt. 1"	J. Williams; Abraham	3:01
17.	"Chapter 2 – Remembrance, Pt. 2"	J. Williams; Abraham	2:46
18.	"Chapter 3 – Of Runaways and Stowaways, Pt. 1"	J. Williams; Abraham	4:54
19.	"Chapter 3 – Of Runaways and Stowaways, Pt. 2"		1:40
20.	"Chapter 4 – Family, Pt. 1"		1:53
21.	"Chapter 4 – Family, Pt. 2"	J. Williams; Abraham	3:36
22.	"Chapter 5 – Menagerie, Pt. 1"		3:40
23.	"Chapter 5 – Menagerie, Pt. 2"	J. Williams; Abraham	2:18
24.	"Chapter 6 – Tipping Point, Pt. 1"	J. Williams; Abraham	1:55
25.	"Chapter 6 – Tipping Point, Pt. 2"		2:57
26.	"Chapter 6 – Tipping Point, Pt. 3"		3:51
27.	"Chapter 7 – Punished, Pt. 1"	J. Williams; Abraham	2:54
28.	"Chapter 7 – Punished, Pt. 2"	J. Williams; Abraham	2:01
29.	"Chapter 7 – Punished, Pt. 3"	J. Williams; Abraham	2:23
30.	"Chapter 8 – A Much Needed Talk, Pt. 1"	J. Williams; Abraham	4:18
31.	"Chapter 8 – A Much Needed Talk, Pt. 2"	J. Williams; Abraham	2:16
32.	"Chapter 8 – A Much Needed Talk, Pt. 3"		2:26
33.	"Chapter 9 – Two Steps Forward, Two Steps Back, Pt. 1"	J. Williams; Abraham	2:07
34.	"Chapter 9 – Two Steps Forward, Two Steps Back, Pt. 2"	J. Williams; Abraham	2:22
35.	"Chapter 9 – Two Steps Forward, Two Steps Back, Pt. 3"		2:02
36.	"Chapter 10 – Kuroyuri, Pt. 1"	J. Williams; Abraham	2:55
37.	"Chapter 10 – Kuroyuri, Pt. 2"	J. Williams; Abraham	3:33
38.	"Chapter 11 – Taking Control, Pt. 1"	J. Williams; Abraham	3:18
39.	"Chapter 11 – Taking Control, Pt. 2"	J. Williams; Abraham	4:32
40.	"Chapter 12 – No Safe Haven, Pt. 1"	J. Williams; Abraham	7:10
41.	"Chapter 12 – No Safe Haven, Pt. 2"	J. Williams; Abraham	8:24
42.	"World of Remnant – Vale"	J. Williams; Abraham	1:53
43.	"World of Remnant – Mistral"	J. Williams; Abraham	1:31
44.	"World of Remnant – Atlas"	J. Williams; Abraham	2:22
45.	"World of Remnant – Vacuo"	J. Williams; Abraham	1:39
46.	"World of Remnant – The Great War"	J. Williams; Abraham	5:50
Total length:			2:43:55

== Volume 5 ==
RWBY: Volume 5 (Music from the Rooster Teeth Series)

Soundtrack album by Jeff Williams
- Released: June 8, 2018
- Genre: Film score; rock
- Label: Rooster Teeth Productions
- Producer: Jeff Williams

Jeff Williams chronology
RWBY: Vol. 4 (2017)	RWBY: Vol. 5 (2018)	RWBY: Vol. 6 (2019)

RWBY: Volume 5 (Music from the Rooster Teeth Series) was released on June 8, 2018, and for Spotify on January 1, 2019. It peaked at 113th on the Billboard 200, and also peaked in the Top 20 of the Top Rock (#18) and Hard Rock (#6) charts as well, along with charting at #7 at the Independent Albums chart.

All tracks are written by Jeff Williams, except where noted.

No.	Title	Writer(s)	Length
1.	"The Triumph" (feat. Casey Lee Williams)		4:14
2.	"Ignite" (feat. Casey Lee Williams & Lamar Hall)		4:04
3.	"Path to Isolation" (feat. Casey Lee Williams)		3:59
4.	"Smile" (feat. Casey Lee Williams)		4:01
5.	"All Things Must Die" (feat. Casey Lee Williams)		4:33
6.	"This Time" (feat. Casey Lee Williams)		4:24
7.	"All That Matters" (feat. Casey Lee Williams)		4:45
8.	"Gold (Acoustic Version)" (feat. Casey Lee Williams)		4:43
9.	"Armed and Ready (Falk Remix)" (feat. Casey Lee Williams)		4:56
10.	"Let's Just Live (Harry Lodes Remix)" (feat. Casey Lee Williams)		3:46
11.	"Welcome to Haven"	J. Williams; Alex Abraham	2:20
12.	"Dread in the Air"	J. Williams; Abraham	4:07
13.	"I Found Him!"	J. Williams; Abraham	1:38
14.	"Hello Leonardo..."	J. Williams; Abraham	2:10
15.	"Mayday! Lancers!"	J. Williams; Abraham	4:46
16.	"Thank You, Sienna"	J. Williams; Abraham	3:09
17.	"Progress Takes Patience"	J. Williams; Abraham	3:00
18.	"First Times All Around"	J. Williams; Abraham	2:11
19.	"Jackpot"	J. Williams; Abraham	2:21
20.	"I'm Her Daughter, After All"		2:16
21.	"Fighting Shape"	J. Williams; Abraham	2:00
22.	"Subtlety Is Out"		2:49
23.	"A Few Signatures"		2:35
24.	"Who Would Ask For This?"		3:47
25.	"Qrow's Rough Day"		2:11
26.	"I've Seen That Bird Before..."		1:40
27.	"Dinner & Coffee"	J. Williams; Abraham	4:46
28.	"When Weiss Was Ten"		3:02
29.	"A Note from Ilia"	J. Williams; Abraham	3:25
30.	"Battle at the Belladonna's"		8:26
31.	"Strength in Forgiveness"	J. Williams; Abraham	2:18
32.	"A Proposal I Can Get Behind"	J. Williams; Abraham	3:23
33.	"Things Aren't Looking Good"	J. Williams; Abraham	2:35
34.	"Showdown in Haven Academy"	J. Williams; Abraham	4:08
35.	""C" Is for Cinder"	J. Williams; Abraham	3:15
36.	"Ooozzzpppiiinnn!!!"	J. Williams; Abraham	4:48
37.	"The Vault"	J. Williams; Abraham	2:17
38.	"Look Who's Talking..."		2:54
39.	"Take This Fight Outside"	J. Williams; Abraham	4:50
40.	"Cease Fire!"	J. Williams; Abraham	3:04
41.	"The Relic & Aftermath"	J. Williams; Abraham	3:37
Total length:			2:23:13

== Volume 6 ==
RWBY: Volume 6 (Music from the Rooster Teeth Series)

Soundtrack album by Jeff Williams
- Released: June 28, 2019
- Genre: Film score; rock
- Label: Rooster Teeth Productions
- Producer: Jeff Williams

Jeff Williams chronology
RWBY: Vol. 5 (2018)	RWBY: Vol. 6 (2019)	RWBY: Vol. 7 (2020)

RWBY: Volume 6 (Music from the Rooster Teeth Series) was released on June 28, 2019. It peaked at #7 in Billboard's Independent Albums chart, #10 on Digital Albums and #11 at Soundtracks.

All tracks are written by Jeff Williams, except where noted.

No.	Title	Writer(s)	Length
1.	"Rising" (feat. Casey Lee Williams)		3:47
2.	"Miracle" (feat. Casey Lee Williams)		4:10
3.	"One Thing" (feat. Casey Lee Williams)		3:45
4.	"Lionize"		3:40
5.	"Big Metal Shoe" (feat. Casey Lee Williams & Lamar Hall)		2:46
6.	"Nevermore" (feat. Casey Lee Williams & Adrienne Cowan)		4:51
7.	"Indomitable" (feat. Casey Lee Williams)		4:57
8.	"Forever Fall" (feat. Casey Lee Williams)		5:23
9.	"Armed and Ready (Acoustic)" (feat. Casey Lee Williams & The Hit Points)		4:28
10.	"The Triumph (Kairi Remix)" (feat. Casey Lee Williams)		4:46
11.	"The Path to Isolation (Heavenview Remix)" (feat. Casey Lee Williams)		5:31
12.	"Trouble Aboard Argus Limited"	J. Williams; Alex Abraham	6:37
13.	"Mistral Central Station"	J. Williams; Abraham	4:29
14.	"The Spider's Web"	J. Williams; Abraham	3:57
15.	"Say Her Name"	J. Williams; Abraham	3:23
16.	"A Delicate Balance"	J. Williams; Abraham	8:30
17.	"Our Creation"	J. Williams; Abraham	5:34
18.	"A Crumbling Cabal"	J. Williams; Abraham	4:15
19.	"Brunswick Farms"	J. Williams; Abraham	3:23
20.	"The Apathy"	J. Williams; Abraham	3:44
21.	"The Grimm Reaper"	J. Williams; Abraham	3:43
22.	"Welcome to Argus"	J. Williams; Abraham	3:57
23.	"Cashews"	J. Williams; Abraham	3:09
24.	"Silver Eyes"	J. Williams; Abraham	3:37
25.	"Jaune's Arc"	J. Williams; Abraham	4:07
26.	"The Heist"	J. Williams; Abraham	4:40
27.	"Down the Cannon"	J. Williams; Abraham	6:46
28.	"Protecting Each Other"	J. Williams; Abraham	7:19
29.	"Ra'viatah, Osa Manetah"	J. Williams; Abraham	4:57
30.	"Fight to Atlas"	J. Williams; Abraham	2:57
Total length:			2:14:41

== Volume 7 ==
RWBY: Volume 7 (Music from the Rooster Teeth Series)

Soundtrack album by Jeff Williams
- Released: July 31, 2020
- Genre: Film score; rock
- Label: Rooster Teeth Productions
- Producer: Jeff Williams

Jeff Williams chronology
RWBY: Vol. 6 (2019)	RWBY: Vol. 7 (2020)	RWBY: Vol. 8 (2021)

RWBY: Volume 7 (Music from the Rooster Teeth Series) was released on July 31, 2020.

All tracks are written by Jeff Williams, except where noted.

No.	Title	Writer(s)	Length
1.	"Trust Love" (feat. Casey Lee Williams)		3:50
2.	"Touch the Sky" (feat. Casey Lee Williams)		5:01
3.	"Hero" (feat. Caleb Hyles)		4:09
4.	"Brand New Day" (feat. Casey Lee Williams)		4:24
5.	"Let's Get Real" (feat. Casey Lee Williams)	J. Williams; Erin Reilly	3:43
6.	"War" (feat. Casey Lee Williams, Dawn M. Bennett, Adrienne Cowan, & Erin Reilly)		3:23
7.	"Celebrate" (feat. Santi C, Casey Lee Williams, & Lamar Hall)		4:58
8.	"Until the End"	Casey Lee Williams	4:29
9.	"Fear" (feat. Casey Lee Williams)		4:30
10.	"I May Fall (Acoustic)" (feat. Casey Lee Williams & Videri String Quartet)		4:41
11.	"Nevermore (Peter Jones Remix)" (feat. Casey Lee Williams & Adrienne Cowan)		4:20
12.	"In the Shadow of Atlas"	J. Williams; Alex Abraham	4:05
13.	"Protector of Mantle"	J. Williams; Abraham	4:31
14.	"Apprehended"	J. Williams; Abraham	3:30
15.	"A New Approach"	J. Williams; Abraham	3:18
16.	"We All Have Our Talents"	J. Williams; Abraham	1:40
17.	"Into the Mines"	J. Williams; Abraham	5:17
18.	"Enjoy the Cake"	J. Williams; Abraham	4:49
19.	"...And Eat it Too"	J. Williams; Abraham	3:09
20.	"Six Possible Outcomes"	J. Williams; Abraham	4:27
21.	"The Sisters Schnee"	J. Williams; Abraham	4:11
22.	"Party Crashers"	J. Williams; Abraham	3:38
23.	"Looking Inward"	J. Williams; Abraham	2:24
24.	"Full-on Vigilante"	J. Williams; Abraham	3:19
25.	"Right Behind That Door"	J. Williams; Abraham	2:44
26.	"You Are Cordially Invited"	J. Williams; Abraham	4:59
27.	"Hey Mom, It's Snowing!"	J. Williams; Abraham	4:16
28.	"Time to Do Our Jobs"	J. Williams; Abraham	3:58
29.	"Mantle Overrun"	J. Williams; Abraham	4:41
30.	"You Big Bag of Bones!"	J. Williams; Abraham	2:59
31.	"Free Ride and a Show"	J. Williams; Abraham	6:39
32.	"It Was Bait"	J. Williams; Abraham	2:51
33.	"Are You With Me?"	J. Williams; Abraham	6:11
34.	"...Then You Trained Us"	J. Williams; Abraham	3:21
35.	"The Timeline Has Changed"	J. Williams; Abraham	2:30
36.	"And I Refuse to Starve"	J. Williams; Abraham	4:23
37.	"The Enemy of Trust"	J. Williams; Abraham	6:45
Total length:			2:26:20

== Volume 8 ==
RWBY: Volume 8 (Music from the Rooster Teeth Series)

Soundtrack album by Jeff Williams featuring Casey Lee Williams and Alex Abraham
- Released: December 31, 2021
- Genre: Film score; rock
- Label: Rooster Teeth Productions
- Producer: Jeff Williams

Jeff Williams chronology
RWBY: Vol. 7 (2020)	RWBY: Vol. 8 (2021)

Singles from RWBY: Volume 8
- 1. "Friend" Released: July 9, 2021

RWBY: Volume 8 (Music from the Rooster Teeth Series) was released on December 31, 2021. This was the first soundtrack in which Jeff Williams did not compose the score, creating only the vocal tracks. Instead, Alex Abraham was the lead composer. The album features contributions by Casey Lee Williams' band OK Goodnight. The release of the album was delayed due to the spread of the Delta variant in Texas, as well as a family emergency concerning Williams.

All tracks are written by Alex Abraham, except where noted.

No.	Title	Music	Length
1.	"For Every Life"	Jeff Williams; Casey Lee Williams	4:26
2.	"The Sky Is Falling"	J. Williams; C. Williams; Lamar Hall	3:48
3.	"Be Strong and Hit Stuff"	J. Williams; C. Williams	4:09
4.	"The Truth"	J. Williams; C. Williams	0:52
5.	"Treasure"	J. Williams; C. Williams	5:08
6.	"Friend"	J. Williams; C. Williams	5:00
7.	"Awake"	Ok Goodnight	5:39
8.	"Touch the Sky" (TOBYNOH Remix)	J. Williams; C. Williams	3:47
9.	"Divide Part I"		6:28
10.	"Divide Part II"		7:29
11.	"Refuge Part I"		5:09
12.	"Refuge Part II"		5:17
13.	"Strings Part I"		4:18
14.	"Strings Part II"		4:20
15.	"Fault Part I"		5:29
16.	"Fault Part II"		5:31
17.	"Amity Part I"		7:47
18.	"Amity Part II"		5:29
19.	"Midnight Part I"	Abraham; C. Williams	3:53
20.	"Midnight Part II"	Abraham; C. Williams	4:44
21.	"War Part I"		7:08
22.	"War Part II"		6:43
23.	"Dark Part I"		5:07
24.	"Dark Part II"		5:49
25.	"Witch Part I"		7:40
26.	"Witch Part II"	Abraham; Martin Gonzalez; Martin de Lima; Peter Jones; Matthew Wang	6:07
27.	"Ultimatum Part I"	Abraham; Gonzalez; de Lima; Jones; Wang	7:04
28.	"Ultimatum Part II"	Abraham; Gonzalez; de Lima; Jones; Wang	6:48
29.	"Risk Part I"	Abraham; Gonzalez; de Lima; Jones; Wang	6:19
30.	"Risk Part II"	Abraham; Gonzalez; de Lima; Jones; Wang	6:23
31.	"Creation Part I"	Abraham; Gonzalez; de Lima; Jones; Wang	3:33
32.	"Creation Part II"	Abraham; Gonzalez; de Lima; Jones; Wang	4:32
33.	"Worthy Part I"	Abraham; Gonzalez; de Lima; Jones; Wang	6:57
34.	"Worthy Part II"	Abraham; Gonzalez; de Lima; Jones; Wang	7:01
35.	"The Final Word Part I"	Abraham; Gonzalez; de Lima; Jones; Wang	7:15
36.	"The Final Word Part II"	Abraham; Gonzalez; de Lima; Jones; Wang	8:05
Total length:			3:21:14

== Volume 9 ==
RWBY: Volume 9 Original Soundtrack

Soundtrack album by Casey Lee Williams and Martin Gonzalez
- Released: July 28, 2023
- Genre: Film score; rock
- Label: Rooster Teeth Productions
- Producer: Casey Lee Williams

Singles from RWBY: Volume 9
- 1. "Inside" Released: February 18, 2023; 2. "The Edge" Released: April 24, 2023

RWBY: Volume 9 Original Soundtrack was released on July 28, 2023. This was the first soundtrack without any input from Jeff Williams; instead, it is mainly composed by Casey Lee Williams and Martin Gonzalez.

No.	Title	Music	Vocals	Length
1.	"Inside"	Casey Lee Williams; Martin Gonzalez		3:39
2.	"Checkmate"	Williams; Gonzalez	Zac Zinger	3:39
3.	"Chatterbox"	Williams; Gonzalez		3:56
4.	"Worthy"	Williams	Ariyel	4:02
5.	"Trapdoor"	Williams; Gonzalez		4:46
6.	"Quiet"	Williams		4:48
7.	"Guide My Way"	Williams; Gonzalez		5:21
8.	"The Edge"	Williams; Gonzalez		4:08
9.	"Wings" (Lo-Fi Version)	Williams		5:09
10.	"Washed Ashore by Strange Tides"	Matthew Wang; Gonzalez		3:34
11.	"You Weren't Supposed to Be Here"	Martin de Lima; Peter Jones; Gonzalez		1:33
12.	"I Think We're in the Ever After"	de Lima; Wang		2:47
13.	"Enough Hopes to Fill This Jar"	Gonzalez		2:23
14.	"The Most Powerful Warrior to Ever Live"	Wang; Gonzalez		2:30
15.	"A Most Joyous Occasion"	Jones		2:56
16.	"The Red Prince's Game"	Wang		2:36
17.	"Missing Some Pieces"	de Lima		2:31
18.	"You're Banished!"	Gonzalez		2:45
19.	"What's the Deal with the Cat?"	Gonzalez		1:52
20.	"It's a Matter of Perspective, You See"	Wang; Jones		3:04
21.	"Acre's Edge"	Gonzalez		1:53
22.	"The Overworked Herbalist"	de Lima		2:09
23.	"I Am a Huntress"	Gonzalez		4:01
24.	"We Ascend"	Gonzalez; de Lima		3:15
25.	"The Night Market"	Wang		2:41
26.	"It's the Rusted Knight!"	Gonzalez; Jones		3:45
27.	"Catching Up with Old Friends"	Jones; Williams; Gonzalez		2:39
28.	"Stuck at a Crossroads"	Gonzalez		2:54
29.	"It Was the First Thing I Saw"	De Lima		2:13
30.	"I'm Late! (The Paper Pleasers' Village)"	Gonzalez; de Lima		3:58
31.	"The to-Do List"	Gonzalez		3:46
32.	"Why Are You Still Here?"	Gonzalez; de Lima		3:40
33.	"Hello, Red! (How About a Little Reset?)"	Gonzalez	Casey Lee Williams	2:22
34.	"I Can Be You Instead"	Gonzalez		2:12
35.	"This Body Will Do"	de Lima; Jones		2:42
36.	"It's Not a Place You Go"	de Lima; Jones		3:29
37.	"Playing the Hero"	Gonzalez; de Lima		2:40
38.	"So Heavy"	Gonzalez; Jones		3:08
39.	"Not Your Typical Mission"	Gonzalez		2:16
40.	"Burn the Leaves!"	Gonzalez		1:29
41.	"Maybe That Girl Is Enough"	Gonzalez	Casey Lee Williams	1:27
42.	"A Happy Dream I Can't Remember"	Gonzalez		2:23
43.	"True Balance (When You Are Needed Most)"	Gonzalez		5:44
