= Younger You =

Single by Miley Cyrus
- Released: March 27, 2026
- Genre: Country
- Length: 2:48
- Label: Hollywood
- Songwriters: Miley Cyrus; Michael Pollack; Stefan Johnson; Jordan K. Johnson; Greg Hein; Jonathan David Bellion
- Producers: Cyrus; Pollack; The Monsters & Strangerz

Miley Cyrus singles chronology
"Dream as One" (2025)	"Younger You" (2026)	"Bass Persuades" (2026)

Music video
- "Younger You" on YouTube

"Younger You" is a song by American singer Miley Cyrus from the Hannah Montana 20th Anniversary Special. It was first performed during the Disney+ television special on March 24, 2026, and released on March 27, 2026 through Hollywood Records.

On April 17, 2026, a duet version of the song featuring Lainey Wilson was released. Wilson previously worked as a Hannah Montana impersonator prior to becoming a successful country artist.

== Background and composition ==
The inclusion of a new song in the Hannah Montana 20th Anniversary Special was announced on March 22, 2026. Cyrus described the television special and the song as "a gift from [her] to younger you [and her] way of saying thank you for [fans'] loyalty and for growing with [her] every step of the way."

The song was written and produced by Cyrus herself with Michael Pollack and producer team The Monsters & Strangerz, with songwriting contribution by Jon Bellion and Aldae. Cyrus described the song meaning through her social media:

"Celebrating Hannah Montana isn't just honoring a show it’s a full-circle moment for me. HM was the beginning of the life I know now. The bond my fans and I share is as rare and beautiful as this whole journey has been. I adore you all and love you deeply. This anniversary special is a gift from me to younger you, my way of saying thank you for your loyalty and for growing with me every step of the way. This song says it all"

== Music video ==
The music video for the song, directed by Sam Wrench, was released on March 27, 2026 through the singer's YouTube channel. The music video features scenes from the Hannah Montana anniversary special, with cameo by Alex Cooper, Chappell Roan, Selena Gomez and Billy Ray Cyrus.

== Charts ==
Chart performance for "Younger You"
Chart (2026)	Peak position
Argentina Anglo Airplay (Monitor Latino)	8
Bolivia Airplay (Monitor Latino)	17
Canada Hot 100 (Billboard)	90
Canada Hot AC (Billboard)	38
Croatia International Airplay (Top lista)	48
Dominican Republic Anglo Airplay (Monitor Latino)	15
Ecuador Anglo Airplay (Monitor Latino)	12
Germany Airplay (BVMI)	79
Global 200 (Billboard)	191
Ireland (IRMA)	83
Japan Hot Overseas (Billboard Japan)	9
Latvia Airplay (TopHit)	89
Lithuania Airplay (TopHit)	99
New Zealand Hot Singles (RMNZ)	6
Panama Anglo Airplay (Monitor Latino)	6
UK Singles (Official Charts)	53
Uruguay Anglo Airplay (Monitor Latino)	8
US Billboard Hot 100	69
US Adult Contemporary (Billboard)	13
US Adult Pop Airplay (Billboard)	22
US Pop Airplay (Billboard)	29
Venezuela Airplay (Record Report)	50

== Release history ==
Release dates and formats for "Younger You"
Region	Date	Format	Label(s)	Ref.
United States	March 31, 2026	Contemporary hit radio	Hollywood	
