= Rita Hayek =

Lebanese actress and television presenter (born 1987)

- ريتا حايك
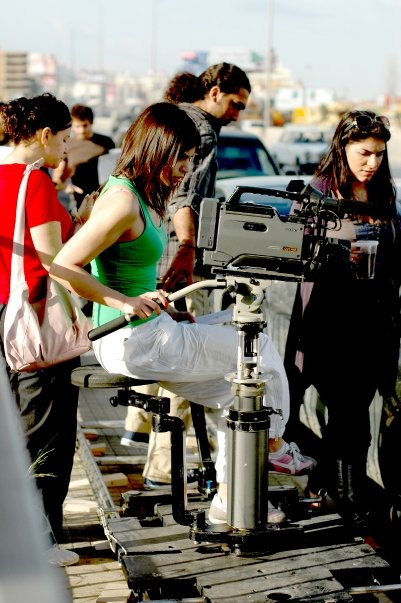
- Born: Rita Elie Hayek; 9 October 1987 (age 38); Beirut, Lebanon
- Occupation: Actress
- Years active: 2005–present
- Spouse: Abdullah Rebeiz (m. 2017)

Rita Elie Hayek (Arabic: ريتا حايك; born 9 October 1987) is a Lebanese actress and television presenter.

== Biography ==
Hayek studied acting at the National Institute Of Fine Arts (or INBA) at the Lebanese University. In 2011, she took acting courses at the Stella Adler Studio of Acting in Hollywood.

Hayek had her first television role in 2005, starring in the drama series A March Dream (Arabic: حلم آذار). A March Dream was a drama production portraying the contemporary events of 2005.

She has been selected to star in a play called High Heels, which portrays social dynamics in a way that is unusual in the region.

In 2017, Hayek starred in The Insult as the wife of the main character. The film was nominated for an Academy Award as Best Foreign Language Film of the Year in 2018 and won several prizes at international film festivals.
