= 218: Behind the Wall of Silence =

2021 Emirati film by Rami Yassin

- Directed by: Nahla Al Fahad
- Written by: Rami Yassin
- Starring: Amal Mohammed, Haifa Al Ali, Habib Ghaloum, Abdullah bin Haidar
- Production company: Sharjah Media City (Shams)
- Release date: 2021
- Running time: 90 minutes
- Country: United Arab Emirates
- Language: Arabic

218: Behind the wall of silence is a drama film written by Rami Yassin and directed by Nahla Al Fahad. It was produced in United Arab Emirates in 2021 and is the first audience-created work in the Arab world as part of the "Emirati Artistic Experience" initiative.

== Plot ==
The film is an Emirati thriller drama that follows the stories of three women who go through three different experiences. Although their experiences are interconnected and interwined in reality, between domestic abuse, longing for the past, the desire of revenge and mutual support. 218: Behind the Wall of Silence discusses social conditions that occur in almost every home and explores the issue of domestic abuse and how modern technology intervenes to help resolve this crisis.

== Cast and crew ==
A large group of actors participated in the Emirati film 218: Behind the Wall of Silence including the following:

- Amal Mohammed, fall name Amal Mohammed Al Mazen, an Emirati actress, born in January 1987.
- Haifa Al Ali, an Emirati actress, born in 1979.
- Habin Ghuloom, an Emirati filmmaker and actor, born in 1963.
- Abdullah bin Haidar, an Emirati actor, best known for his roles in the television series Rashash (2021) and Six Minus One (2022).
- Marai Al Halyan, a Jordanian actor, director, and author, born in Sharjah in 1965.
- Mansour Al Feli, an Emirati actress, born in Sharjah in 1977.

== About the film ==
- The film was nominated in three categories at the "Septimius Film Festival" in Netherlands, Best Director, Best Actress, and Best Asian Film. Emirati actress Amal Mohammed won the award for the Best Asian Actress for her role in the Emirati film 218: Behind the Wall of Silence.
- 218: Behind the Wall of Silence is the first feature-length film by the Emirati director Nahla Al Fahad in her cinematic career.
- 218: Behind the Wall of Silence is one of the first works produced by Sharjah Media City (Shams), with adopted the idea of the Emirati Artistic Experience initiative that took place for the first time in the Meddle East. The initiative focuses on supporting and training a new generation of young filmmakers in order to engage with the cinematic movement in the United Arab Emirates and the region.
