= 2021 Iraqi parliamentary election =

- 10 October 2021
- All 329 seats in the Council of Representatives; 165 seats needed for a majority
- Turnout: 43.30% (▼1.22 pp)
Party	Leader	Vote %	Seats	+/–
Sadrist Movement	Muqtada al-Sadr	10.00	73	+19
KDP	Masoud Barzani	8.83	31	+6
Progress Party	Mohamed Al-Halbousi	7.20	37	New
State of Law	Nouri al-Maliki	5.67	33	+8
Fatah	Hadi al-Amiri	5.23	17	−31
Azem Alliance	Khamis al-Khanjar	4.76	14	New
Kurdistan Coalition	Qubad Talabani	4.16	17	−1
ANSF	Haider al-Abadi	4.06	4	−38
Emtidad	Alaa al-Rikabi	3.38	9	New
National Contract	Falih al-Fayyadh	2.66	4	New
NGM	Shaswar Abdulwahid	2.64	9	+5
Tasmim Alliance	Sarah al-Salihi	1.73	5	New
National Approach	Ammar Tu'ma	1.22	1	New
Ishraqat Kanoon	Jaafar Aziz	1.13	6	New
Rights Movement	Hassan Muanes	1.12	1	New
Eqtadar Watan	Abdulhussein Abtan	0.83	1	New
KDK	Ali Bapir	0.72	1	−1
Identity Alliance	Ahmed M. al-Jubouri	0.66	3	New
Babylon Movement	Rayan al-Kildani	0.57	4	+2
NPM	Ahmed A. al-Jubouri	0.56	1	−1
UITF	Arshad al-Salihi	0.55	1	−2
Iraqi National Project	Jamal al-Dhari	0.51	1	New
Furatayn Movement	Mohamed al-Sudani	0.45	1	New
National Product	Ghadanfar al-Batikh	0.41	1	New
Wasit Independents	Mohamed al-Mayahi	0.35	1	New
Movement for Reform	Thabit al-Abbasi	0.30	3	New
AAK	Rakan Al-Jabouri	0.30	1	−2
Loyalty and Change	Iskander Witwit	0.17	1	New
National Hopes	Mohamed al-Wazzan	0.17	1	New
Homeland Party	Mashaan al-Jubouri	0.14	1	New
Biladi	Zahra al-Salman	0.09	1	New
National Support	Falih al-Hereshawi	0.07	1	New
Yazidi Progress		0.05	1	0
Independents	−	19.05	43	+40
This lists parties that won seats. See the complete results below.
Results by district
Prime Minister before	Prime Minister after
Mustafa Al-Kadhimi; Independent	Mohammed Shia' al-Sudani; Furatayn Movement

Parliamentary elections were held in Iraq on 10 October 2021. The elections determined the 329 members of the Council of Representatives who in turn elected the Iraqi president and confirmed the prime minister. These were Iraq's fifth parliamentary election since the 2003 US-led invasion and the first since the 2019 Iraqi October Revolution.

The election results would result in protests in Baghdad and an 11 month-long political crisis.

== Background ==
The elections were originally due to be held in 2022, but were brought forward to June 2021 amidst the 2019–2021 Iraqi protests. They were then delayed until October as the Independent High Electoral Commission asked for more time to organize "free and fair elections", which the cabinet of Iraq approved on 19 January 2021.

== Electoral system ==
The electoral system was changed following the last parliamentary elections amid the 2019–2021 Iraqi protests. Previously conducted under proportional representation calculated using the Webster/Sainte-Laguë method with the governorates as constituencies, the 2021 elections were conducted under single non-transferable vote. (Note: The distribution of the number of electoral districts in each governorate relies on the number of quota seats for women multiplied by 3 or 5 seats for the electoral district depending on the governate’s population size.) Of the 329 total seats, 320 were elected in 83 multi-member constituencies ranging in size from 3 to 5 seats. One seat in each constituency is reserved for the most voted woman. Nine seats are reserved for minorities (5 for Christians and 1 each for Yazidis, Shabaks, Mandaeans and Feyli Kurds).

== Boycott threats ==
On 15 July 2021, Muqtada al-Sadr announced the Sadrist Movement intended to boycott the October 10th election, citing corruption and voter fraud and claiming that free and fair elections were impossible in the wake of the ongoing political crisis. On 24 July, the Iraqi Communist Party (which ran with the Sadrist Movement as the Alliance Towards Reforms in 2018), announced they were boycotting the elections, stating "In the absence of conditions for free and fair elections, participation in them would only mean collusion in reproducing the same corrupt political system that is responsible for the catastrophic state of affairs in the country." Louis Raphaël I Sako, Patriarch of the Chaldean Catholic Church, also called on Christians to boycott the election.

The boycotts have been condemned by the United Nations Assistance Mission for Iraq, as well as by other Iraqi political parties and leaders, including former Prime Minister Nouri al-Maliki, leader of the State of Law Coalition, and the Kurdistan Democratic Party.

On 27 August, al-Sadr reversed his decision to boycott and announced his party would take part in the election.

On 9 October, Kurdistan Socialist Democratic Party announced that they would withdraw their candidates from the elections in Dohuk, Erbil and Sulaymaniyah governorates (10 constituencies) and declared their support for the Kurdistan Democratic Party.

== Voter turnout by province ==
Iraq's Independent High Electoral Commission initially published a national voter turnout of 42.15%, with 8,818,210 voters out of an electorate of 20,919,844. The Commission later updated these results to show a slightly lower turnout of 41.05%, based on 9,077,779 voters out of 22,116,368 eligible.

Province	Turnout
Anbar	43%
Babil	46%
Baghdad–Al-Rusafa	31%
Baghdad–Karkh	34%
Basra	40%
Duhok	54%
Dhi Qar	42%
Diyala	46%
Erbil	46%
Karbala	44%
Kirkuk	44%
Maysan	43%
Muthanna	44%
Najaf	41%
Nineveh	42%
Al-Qadisiyyah	42%
Saladin	48%
Sulaymaniyah _{(incl. Halabja)}	37%
Wasit	44%
Turnout	41.05%

== Results ==
=== National results ===
Soldiers, prisoners, and displaced people voted early on 8 October.

The Independent High Electoral Commission announced partial preliminary results on 11 October. The Sadrist political bloc received the most seats after the initial count, with 73. The political Fatah Alliance, a coalition of the pro-Iran Badr Organisation and Asa'ib Ahl al-Haq (AAH), won 17 seats, down from the 48 it had won in the prior election. Hadi al-Amiri and Qais al-Khazali, leaders of Badr Organisation and AAH respectively, rejected the results, alleging "fraud" in the elections. They took their case to court seeking "to have the results annulled" because of "serious violations". On 12 October, the commission announced a manual count of polling stations that were not electronically counted in the initial canvass. Of the total 57,944 polling stations, 45,716 uploaded electronic results. 8,547 stations were selected by lottery to be manually counted, while the remaining 3,681 stations experienced technical difficulties necessitating a manual count as well. This manual count is expected to modify the overall allocation of seats.

On 15 October, the commission noted it had received 356 complaints about the preliminary election count by the 14 October deadline. The complaints division must address the complaints within seven days, which may then be reviewed by the judiciary within ten days. Final results will not be released until the complaints are resolved.

Late on 16 October, the commission announced its updated preliminary results after completion of manual recounts. The updated results triggered another opportunity to file election complaints with a deadline of 19 October. The commission had received over 1,000 complaints by 18 October, but a spokesperson stated it was unlikely the appeals will change the outcome.

Official final results, after recounting by The High Electoral Commission were shared on November 30.

On 27 December, the Iraqi Supreme Court ratified the parliamentary election results after rejecting a complaint of irregularities filed by al-Amiri and al-Khazali.

The Alliance Towards Reforms won 73 seats, with the Progress Party winning 37, the State of Law Coalition winning 34, the Kurdistan Democratic Party with 32, the Fatah Alliance winning 17 seats, the Patriotic Union of Kurdistan gaining 16 seats, the Azem Alliance with 12 seats, while the Emtidad Movement and the New Generation Movement received nine seats each, and political independents gained 40 seats.

As for the seats reserved for minorities, the Babylon Movement won 4 seats out of 5 reserved for Christians, while 1 seat was gained by an independent candidate. The Yazidi single seat was won by the Yazidi Movement for Reform and Progress. Likewise, one seat each reserved for the Yezidi and Shabak communities were won by Nayef Khalaf Sido of the Yezidi Progress Party, and independent candidate Waad Mahmoud Ahmed respectively.

Party	Votes	%	Seats
Sadrist Movement	885,310	10.00	73
Kurdistan Democratic Party	781,670	8.83	31
Progress Party	637,198	7.20	37
State of Law Coalition	502,188	5.67	33
Fatah Alliance	462,800	5.23	17
Azem Alliance	421,579	4.76	14
Kurdistani Coalition	368,226	4.16	17
Alliance of Nation State Forces	359,876	4.06	4
Emtidad Movement	299,303	3.38	9
National Contract Alliance	235,726	2.66	4
New Generation Movement	233,834	2.64	9
Tasmim Alliance	153,614	1.73	5
Qadimun	119,640	1.35	0
National Approach Alliance	107,600	1.22	1
Ishraqat Kanoon	100,374	1.13	6
Rights Movement	99,503	1.12	1
Eqtadar Watan Party	73,210	0.83	1
Kurdistan Justice Group	64,025	0.72	1
Iraqi Loyalty Movement	60,177	0.68	0
Our People are Our Identity	58,089	0.66	3
Babylon Movement	50,378	0.57	4
Professionals Party for Reconstruction	49,766	0.56	0
National Party of the Masses	49,443	0.56	1
Unified Iraqi Turkmen Front	48,422	0.55	1
Iraqi National Project	45,197	0.51	1
Al-Faw Zakho Coalition	42,033	0.47	0
Furatayn Movement	39,500	0.45	1
United for Iraq	39,230	0.44	0
National Product Party	35,891	0.41	1
Wathiqoon	35,677	0.40	0
Wasit Independents Bloc	30,918	0.35	1
Al-Wataniya	28,957	0.33	0
National Depth Alliance	28,706	0.32	0
Hasim Movement for Reform	26,973	0.30	3
Arab Alliance of Kirkuk	26,414	0.30	1
National Awareness Movement	24,678	0.28	0
National Correction Party	22,656	0.26	0
Civic Party	22,628	0.26	0
Rescuers	22,455	0.25	0
Iraqi National Movement	21,419	0.24	0
Achievement Movement	21,382	0.24	0
Ḥarakat Nāzl Akhdh Ḥaqqī al-Dīmuqrāṭīyah	21,172	0.24	0
Hammurabi Coalition	18,212	0.21	0
Gathering of Talents and Masses	16,130	0.18	0
Loyalty and Change Bloc	15,241	0.17	1
National Hopes Bloc	15,140	0.17	1
Iraq Renaissance and Peace Bloc	15,135	0.17	0
Capable Coalition	14,724	0.17	0
Al-Istqrar Bloc	13,975	0.16	0
Popular Will Project	13,632	0.15	0
Homeland Safety Coalition	12,287	0.14	0
Homeland Party	12,266	0.14	1
Tayyār al-Kalimah	12,082	0.14	0
Al-Nour Movement - Uprising and Change	11,931	0.13	0
United Arab Front	11,158	0.13	0
Assyrian Democratic Movement	10,572	0.12	0
Civil Democratic Alliance	9,540	0.11	0
Elite Party	8,981	0.10	0
Coalition of Iraqi Unity	8,649	0.10	0
Biladi National Movement	8,384	0.09	1
Kurdistan Social Democratic Party	8,221	0.09	0
Chaldean Syriac Assyrian Popular Council	7,589	0.09	0
Construction and Reform Rally	7,249	0.08	0
Al-Aerobion Party	6,737	0.08	0
Gathering of Loyal Hands	6,573	0.07	0
National Support Alliance	6,515	0.07	1
Al-Atifak Iraqi National Party	6,098	0.07	0
Confrontation	6,062	0.07	0
Independents Bloc	5,563	0.06	0
National Certainty Party	5,193	0.06	0
Thaar Allah Islamic Party	5,084	0.06	0
Conservatives	4,939	0.06	0
Iraqi Economy Alliance/Economists	4,809	0.05	0
Educators' Gathering	4,194	0.05	0
National Sacrifice Block	4,110	0.05	0
Yazidi Progress Party	3,988	0.05	1
Iraqi Republican Group Party	3,962	0.04	0
National Tribal Movement in Iraq	3,956	0.04	0
Renaissance and Construction Gathering	3,917	0.04	0
National Awakening Gathering	3,873	0.04	0
Yazidi Freedom and Democracy Party	3,651	0.04	0
Youth Movement for Change	3,588	0.04	0
Supporters of the Truth Nation	3,480	0.04	0
People's Parliament Assembly	3,318	0.04	0
Dialogue and Change Party	3,176	0.04	0
Kafa Movement	3,152	0.04	0
Iraqi Turkmen Front	3,118	0.04	0
Alliance of Civilian Forces	2,986	0.03	0
Yazidi Democratic Party	2,875	0.03	0
Assyrian National Party	2,810	0.03	0
New Iraq Gathering	2,645	0.03	0
Iraq is our Identity	2,471	0.03	0
Iraqi National Loyalty Party	2,419	0.03	0
White Dome Assembly	2,117	0.02	0
Iraq Shield Bloc	2,082	0.02	0
Tishreen National Gathering	2,067	0.02	0
Al-Daae Party	1,878	0.02	0
Beth Nahrin Patriotic Union	1,827	0.02	0
Voices of the Masses Gathering	1,792	0.02	0
Yazidi Movement for Reform and Progress	1,791	0.02	0
Trust Party	1,620	0.02	0
Iraqi Wafd Party	1,586	0.02	0
Communist Party of Kurdistan – Iraq	1,392	0.02	0
Iraqi Civil Society Gathering	1,350	0.02	0
Free Iraqi Bloc	1,261	0.01	0
Tyar Al-Tahady	1,168	0.01	0
Kurdistan Toilers' Party	1,166	0.01	0
Iraqi Harmony	1,074	0.01	0
Al-Med Al-Iraqi Movement	1,007	0.01	0
Righteous Front	872	0.01	0
Islamic Loyalist Movement	852	0.01	0
Banners of Benevolence	822	0.01	0
The Blessed Shaaban Uprising/Iraq's Call	785	0.01	0
Justice and Unity Gathering	782	0.01	0
Iraqi Turkmen Maidan Party	723	0.01	0
National Majority Movement	705	0.01	0
Ahālī al-Sharqāṭ	516	0.01	0
Tajammu' al-Qal'ah	391	0.00	0
National Unity Front	310	0.00	0
Kurdistan Islamic Movement	222	0.00	0
Iraqi Glory Party	163	0.00	0
Iraqi Promise	133	0.00	0
Tanẓīm al-Dākhil	132	0.00	0
Unified Iraqi Democratic Council	110	0.00	0
Arab Levant Party	102	0.00	0
National Assembly of the People of Iraq	101	0.00	0
Iraqi Communist Party	70	0.00	0
People's Reform Party	53	0.00	0
Civil Path Party	14	0.00	0
Independent	1,686,792	19.05	43
Total	8,854,025	100.00	329
Valid votes	8,906,959	92.50	
Invalid/blank votes	722,642	7.50	
Total votes	9,629,601	100.00	
Registered voters/turnout	22,116,368	43.54	

=== Results by district ===
Election results by district in Anbar Governorate

District 1
Party	Votes	%	Seats
Progress Party	36,793	36.71	1
Progress Party	11,264	11.24	1
Progress Party	8,442	8.42	1
Progress Party	6,957	6.94	1
Azem Alliance	5,047	5.04	–
Azem Alliance	4,471	4.46	–
Azem Alliance	4,207	4.20	–
National Contract Alliance	3,110	3.10	–
Independent	2,842	2.84	–
Alliance of Nation State Forces	2,224	2.22	–
Independent	1,859	1.85	–
Independent	1,212	1.21	–
Independent	1,173	1.17	–
Independent	1,016	1.01	–
Popular Will Project	973	0.97	–
National Correction Party	972	0.97	–
Azem Alliance	878	0.88	–
Iraqi National Project	877	0.87	–
Iraqi National Project	716	0.71	–
Capable Coalition	619	0.62	–
Progress Party	565	0.56	–
Al-Wataniya	482	0.48	–
National Awakening Gathering	431	0.43	–
Kurdistan Democratic Party	429	0.43	–
Alliance of Civilian Forces	386	0.39	–
Popular Will Project	365	0.36	–
Al-Atifak Iraqi National Party	349	0.35	–
Al-Atifak Iraqi National Party	287	0.29	–
Independent	254	0.25	–
Independent	186	0.19	–
Independent	163	0.16	–
Wathiqoon	154	0.15	–
State of Law Coalition	152	0.15	–
Qadimun	101	0.10	–
Alliance of Nation State Forces	90	0.09	–
Progress Party	73	0.07	–
Independent	62	0.06	–
National Awakening Gathering	41	0.04	–
Tayyār al-Kalimah	16	0.02	–
Total	100,238	100.00	4
Valid votes	103,041	95.50	
Invalid/blank votes	4,856	4.50	
Total votes	107,897	100.00	
Registered voters/turnout	304,054	35.49	

District 2
Party	Votes	%	Seats
Progress Party	22,492	18.05	1
Progress Party	10,715	8.60	1
Progress Party	9,176	7.36	1
Progress Party	7,920	6.35	–
Azem Alliance	7,471	5.99	–
Azem Alliance	6,561	5.26	–
Independent	5,962	4.78	1
Progress Party	5,743	4.61	–
National Contract Alliance	4,872	3.91	–
Independent	4,776	3.83	–
Coalition of Iraqi Unity	4,617	3.70	–
Azem Alliance	4,289	3.44	–
Azem Alliance	3,330	2.67	–
Progress Party	3,195	2.56	–
Independent	3,121	2.50	–
Independent	2,464	1.98	–
Independent	1,812	1.45	–
Independent	1,741	1.40	–
Independent	1,661	1.33	–
Independent	1,575	1.26	–
Popular Will Project	1,287	1.03	–
Al-Aerobion Party	1,245	1.00	–
Azem Alliance	1,090	0.87	–
National Contract Alliance	844	0.68	–
Independent	773	0.62	–
National Awakening Gathering	720	0.58	–
National Correction Party	670	0.54	–
Azem Alliance	636	0.51	–
Independent	574	0.46	–
Independent	552	0.44	–
Al-Atifak Iraqi National Party	478	0.38	–
Independent	384	0.31	–
State of Law Coalition	377	0.30	–
Azem Alliance	354	0.28	–
Independent	205	0.16	–
Independent	143	0.11	–
Progress Party	131	0.11	–
National Certainty Party	83	0.07	–
Fatah Alliance	78	0.06	–
Independent	74	0.06	–
Iraqi National Project	71	0.06	–
Independent	62	0.05	–
Popular Will Project	59	0.05	–
Independent	51	0.04	–
Independent	41	0.03	–
Qadimun	40	0.03	–
Iraqi National Movement	36	0.03	–
Independent	28	0.02	–
Independent	26	0.02	–
National Awakening Gathering	24	0.02	–
Total	124,629	100.00	4
Valid votes	125,318	95.98	
Invalid/blank votes	5,254	4.02	
Total votes	130,572	100.00	
Registered voters/turnout	271,031	48.18	

District 3
Party	Votes	%	Seats
Progress Party	17,129	20.51	1
Azem Alliance	10,366	12.41	1
Azem Alliance	7,416	8.88	–
Popular Will Project	7,290	8.73	–
Progress Party	6,468	7.74	–
Azem Alliance	5,571	6.67	–
Progress Party	3,928	4.70	–
Independent	3,544	4.24	–
Progress Party	3,327	3.98	1
Progress Party	3,323	3.98	–
National Contract Alliance	2,425	2.90	–
Progress Party	2,329	2.79	–
Independent	1,984	2.38	–
Independent	1,676	2.01	–
Independent	1,292	1.55	–
Independent	1,097	1.31	–
Azem Alliance	1,033	1.24	–
Independent	889	1.06	–
Dialogue and Change Party	766	0.92	–
Qadimun	385	0.46	–
State of Law Coalition	380	0.45	–
Qadimun	251	0.30	–
Independent	175	0.21	–
Iraqi National Project	142	0.17	–
Independent	120	0.14	–
Independent	57	0.07	–
Independent	48	0.06	–
Iraqi National Movement	33	0.04	–
Al-Wataniya	25	0.03	–
Iraqi National Project	24	0.03	–
Independent	22	0.03	–
Independent	19	0.02	–
Total	83,534	100.00	3
Valid votes	94,805	95.80	
Invalid/blank votes	4,161	4.20	
Total votes	98,966	100.00	
Registered voters/turnout	186,696	53.01	

District 4
Party	Votes	%	Seats
Progress Party	11,961	9.35	1
Independent	8,929	6.98	1
Independent	7,439	5.81	1
Independent	7,139	5.58	1
Iraqi National Project	6,902	5.39	–
Progress Party	6,716	5.25	–
Progress Party	6,638	5.19	–
Azem Alliance	6,084	4.75	–
Progress Party	5,767	4.51	–
Azem Alliance	5,736	4.48	–
Progress Party	5,674	4.43	–
National Contract Alliance	4,724	3.69	–
Independent	4,368	3.41	–
Progress Party	4,283	3.35	–
Independent	4,021	3.14	–
Independent	3,364	2.63	–
Alliance of Nation State Forces	3,080	2.41	–
National Contract Alliance	2,508	1.96	–
Coalition of Iraqi Unity	2,449	1.91	–
Independent	2,407	1.88	–
Popular Will Project	1,890	1.48	–
Ḥarakat Nāzl Akhdh Ḥaqqī al-Dīmuqrāṭīyah	1,862	1.45	–
Popular Will Project	1,768	1.38	–
Independent	1,707	1.33	–
Independent	1,520	1.19	–
Independent	1,464	1.14	–
Azem Alliance	1,358	1.06	–
Azem Alliance	1,086	0.85	–
Independent	948	0.74	–
Independent	664	0.52	–
Qadimun	631	0.49	–
Independent	513	0.40	–
Progress Party	430	0.34	–
Independent	420	0.33	–
Independent	400	0.31	–
Independent	217	0.17	–
Independent	189	0.15	–
Qadimun	184	0.14	–
Civic Party	142	0.11	–
Azem Alliance	113	0.09	–
National Awakening Gathering	83	0.06	–
Independent	58	0.05	–
Independent	53	0.04	–
Independent	52	0.04	–
National Tribal Movement in Iraq	51	0.04	–
Total	127,992	100.00	4
Valid votes	136,384	95.67	
Invalid/blank votes	6,172	4.33	
Total votes	142,556	100.00	
Registered voters/turnout	300,813	47.39	

Election results by district in Babylon Governorate

District 1
Party	Votes	%	Seats
Emtidad Movement	16,083	11.45	1
Loyalty and Change Bloc	15,241	10.85	1
Ishraqat Kanoon	11,012	7.84	1
Sadrist Movement	8,929	6.36	–
Alliance of Nation State Forces	7,770	5.53	–
Independent	6,950	4.95	–
Alliance of Nation State Forces	5,910	4.21	–
Alliance of Nation State Forces	5,370	3.82	–
State of Law Coalition	5,356	3.81	1
Sadrist Movement	4,939	3.52	–
Fatah Alliance	4,854	3.46	–
Independent	4,720	3.36	–
Independent	4,390	3.12	–
Independent	3,953	2.81	–
Qadimun	3,736	2.66	–
Independent	3,573	2.54	–
Gathering of Talents and Masses	2,848	2.03	–
Qadimun	2,687	1.91	–
Independent	2,486	1.77	–
Independent	2,485	1.77	–
Al-Faw Zakho Coalition	2,394	1.70	–
Qadimun	2,027	1.44	–
Independent	1,743	1.24	–
National Contract Alliance	1,688	1.20	–
Achievement Movement	1,481	1.05	–
Eqtadar Watan Party	1,276	0.91	–
Independent	1,235	0.88	–
Independent	1,043	0.74	–
Independent	1,029	0.73	–
Independent	781	0.56	–
Civic Party	608	0.43	–
Homeland Safety Coalition	339	0.24	–
Eqtadar Watan Party	333	0.24	–
Al-Wataniya	279	0.20	–
Iraqi Loyalty Movement	215	0.15	–
Independent	199	0.14	–
Biladi National Movement	199	0.14	–
Rescuers	175	0.12	–
Independent	81	0.06	–
Independent	66	0.05	–
Total	140,483	100.00	4
Valid votes	138,076	94.88	
Invalid/blank votes	7,444	5.12	
Total votes	145,520	100.00	
Registered voters/turnout	304,327	47.82	

District 2
Party	Votes	%	Seats
Emtidad Movement	10,612	11.32	1
State of Law Coalition	7,683	8.20	1
Ishraqat Kanoon	7,222	7.70	1
Independent	6,595	7.03	1
Alliance of Nation State Forces	6,493	6.93	–
Sadrist Movement	5,638	6.01	–
Fatah Alliance	5,199	5.55	–
Alliance of Nation State Forces	4,687	5.00	–
Independent	3,218	3.43	–
Sadrist Movement	2,948	3.14	–
Independent	2,816	3.00	–
Gathering of Talents and Masses	2,704	2.88	–
Independent	2,579	2.75	–
Qadimun	2,461	2.63	–
Iraqi Loyalty Movement	2,372	2.53	–
Independent	2,108	2.25	–
Independent	1,881	2.01	–
National Contract Alliance	1,796	1.92	–
Eqtadar Watan Party	1,516	1.62	–
Independent	1,424	1.52	–
Civic Party	1,313	1.40	–
National Approach Alliance	1,295	1.38	–
Tasmim Alliance	1,245	1.33	–
Independent	1,184	1.26	–
Independent	1,025	1.09	–
Alliance of Nation State Forces	743	0.79	–
National Hopes Bloc	660	0.70	–
Independent	645	0.69	–
Independent	640	0.68	–
New Iraq Gathering	491	0.52	–
Tasmim Alliance	477	0.51	–
Fatah Alliance	415	0.44	–
Voices of the Masses Gathering	406	0.43	–
Qadimun	254	0.27	–
Al-Nour Movement - Uprising and Change	242	0.26	–
Independent	236	0.25	–
National Awareness Movement	234	0.25	–
Capable Coalition	124	0.13	–
Rescuers	119	0.13	–
Civil Democratic Alliance	47	0.05	–
Total	93,747	100.00	4
Valid votes	90,109	93.44	
Invalid/blank votes	6,321	6.56	
Total votes	96,430	100.00	
Registered voters/turnout	220,973	43.64	

District 3
Party	Votes	%	Seats
Independent	14,699	10.93	1
State of Law Coalition	13,156	9.78	1
Independent	10,654	7.92	1
Fatah Alliance	10,433	7.76	–
Independent	10,339	7.69	–
Sadrist Movement	9,173	6.82	1
Independent	7,231	5.38	–
Alliance of Nation State Forces	6,513	4.84	–
Independent	6,325	4.70	–
Emtidad Movement	4,196	3.12	–
Iraqi National Movement	4,109	3.06	–
National Approach Alliance	4,099	3.05	–
Independent	3,835	2.85	–
Ishraqat Kanoon	3,094	2.30	–
Iraqi Loyalty Movement	3,080	2.29	–
Alliance of Nation State Forces	3,079	2.29	–
Al-Faw Zakho Coalition	2,997	2.23	–
Gathering of Talents and Masses	2,675	1.99	–
Independent	2,495	1.86	–
Eqtadar Watan Party	2,346	1.74	–
Independent	2,133	1.59	–
Ḥarakat Nāzl Akhdh Ḥaqqī al-Dīmuqrāṭīyah	1,660	1.23	–
Rights Movement	1,489	1.11	–
Independent	896	0.67	–
Achievement Movement	849	0.63	–
Independent	780	0.58	–
Kafa Movement	630	0.47	–
Tasmim Alliance	334	0.25	–
National Depth Alliance	328	0.24	–
Independent	272	0.20	–
Furatayn Movement	215	0.16	–
Tayyār al-Kalimah	99	0.07	–
Fatah Alliance	76	0.06	–
Independent	60	0.04	–
Alliance of Nation State Forces	55	0.04	–
Al-Daae Party	37	0.03	–
Independent	31	0.02	–
Total	134,472	100.00	4
Valid votes	132,372	96.10	
Invalid/blank votes	5,368	3.90	
Total votes	137,740	100.00	
Registered voters/turnout	260,688	52.84	

District 4
Party	Votes	%	Seats
Sadrist Movement	18,125	11.57	1
Fatah Alliance	11,461	7.32	1
Fatah Alliance	11,084	7.08	1
Independent	10,866	6.94	1
Progress Party	10,560	6.74	1
Sadrist Movement	9,837	6.28	–
State of Law Coalition	9,402	6.00	–
National Contract Alliance	9,123	5.83	–
Emtidad Movement	8,447	5.39	–
Independent	8,404	5.37	–
Achievement Movement	7,314	4.67	–
Independent	6,417	4.10	–
Alliance of Nation State Forces	5,579	3.56	–
Rights Movement	4,075	2.60	–
Independent	2,401	1.53	–
Alliance of Nation State Forces	2,285	1.46	–
Independent	2,216	1.42	–
Independent	2,146	1.37	–
Tasmim Alliance	2,037	1.30	–
Rescuers	1,840	1.18	–
Elite Party	1,754	1.12	–
Independent	1,749	1.12	–
United for Iraq	1,378	0.88	–
Confrontation	1,299	0.83	–
Ishraqat Kanoon	831	0.53	–
Iraqi Loyalty Movement	791	0.51	–
Wathiqoon	741	0.47	–
Al-Atifak Iraqi National Party	722	0.46	–
Confrontation	703	0.45	–
Iraqi Republican Group Party	670	0.43	–
Civic Party	560	0.36	–
Al-Wataniya	551	0.35	–
Iraqi Republican Group Party	450	0.29	–
Qadimun	373	0.24	–
Qadimun	203	0.13	–
Independent	124	0.08	–
Civil Democratic Alliance	74	0.05	–
Total	156,592	100.00	5
Valid votes	155,730	95.54	
Invalid/blank votes	7,266	4.46	
Total votes	162,996	100.00	
Registered voters/turnout	363,631	44.82	

Election results by district in Baghdad Governorate

District 1
Party	Votes	%	Seats
State of Law Coalition	16,054	14.79	1
Progress Party	15,549	14.32	1
Fatah Alliance	10,720	9.87	1
Sadrist Movement	9,782	9.01	–
Sadrist Movement	9,703	8.94	1
Al-Wataniya	6,564	6.05	–
Azem Alliance	5,397	4.97	–
Independent	4,758	4.38	–
Professionals Party for Reconstruction	4,658	4.29	–
Rights Movement	3,246	2.99	–
Qadimun	2,678	2.47	–
Alliance of Nation State Forces	2,215	2.04	–
Capable Coalition	1,953	1.80	–
Eqtadar Watan Party	1,490	1.37	–
Furatayn Movement	1,348	1.24	–
National Approach Alliance	1,208	1.11	–
Wathiqoon	1,177	1.08	–
Independent	1,020	0.94	–
Alliance of Nation State Forces	984	0.91	–
Independent	908	0.84	–
Independent	863	0.79	–
Justice and Unity Gathering	782	0.72	–
National Contract Alliance	701	0.65	–
Qadimun	683	0.63	–
Independent	565	0.52	–
Independent	408	0.38	–
Independent	400	0.37	–
Homeland Safety Coalition	379	0.35	–
Independent	309	0.28	–
Independent	302	0.28	–
Alliance of Nation State Forces	256	0.24	–
Azem Alliance	240	0.22	–
Independent	165	0.15	–
Iraqi Loyalty Movement	140	0.13	–
Ishraqat Kanoon	125	0.12	–
Qadimun	113	0.10	–
Civic Party	110	0.10	–
Youth Movement for Change	109	0.10	–
Al-Atifak Iraqi National Party	101	0.09	–
Independent	97	0.09	–
Tishreen National Gathering	95	0.09	–
Construction and Reform Rally	88	0.08	–
Qadimun	67	0.06	–
Rights Movement	39	0.04	–
Rescuers	28	0.03	–
Total	108,577	100.00	4
Valid votes	108,172	95.02	
Invalid/blank votes	5,673	4.98	
Total votes	113,845	100.00	
Registered voters/turnout	246,208	46.24	

District 2
Party	Votes	%	Seats
Sadrist Movement	23,269	23.53	1
Sadrist Movement	21,591	21.84	1
State of Law Coalition	10,798	10.92	1
Sadrist Movement	8,650	8.75	1
Fatah Alliance	7,567	7.65	–
Rights Movement	4,468	4.52	–
Alliance of Nation State Forces	3,614	3.66	–
Kurdistan Democratic Party	3,096	3.13	–
National Approach Alliance	2,193	2.22	–
Emtidad Movement	2,190	2.21	–
Ishraqat Kanoon	2,075	2.10	–
Professionals Party for Reconstruction	1,583	1.60	–
Independent	1,000	1.01	–
Eqtadar Watan Party	899	0.91	–
Civic Party	677	0.68	–
National Certainty Party	654	0.66	–
Independent	635	0.64	–
Homeland Safety Coalition	569	0.58	–
Tayyār al-Kalimah	547	0.55	–
Capable Coalition	484	0.49	–
Rights Movement	413	0.42	–
National Sacrifice Block	403	0.41	–
Civil Democratic Alliance	278	0.28	–
Iraqi Loyalty Movement	206	0.21	–
Al-Wataniya	200	0.20	–
Rescuers	168	0.17	–
Al-Wataniya	156	0.16	–
Qadimun	134	0.14	–
Achievement Movement	129	0.13	–
New Generation Movement	129	0.13	–
Al-Atifak Iraqi National Party	99	0.10	–
Total	98,874	100.00	4
Valid votes	92,567	90.82	
Invalid/blank votes	9,356	9.18	
Total votes	101,923	100.00	
Registered voters/turnout	307,375	33.16	

District 3
Party	Votes	%	Seats
Sadrist Movement	18,138	16.44	1
Sadrist Movement	17,527	15.88	1
Sadrist Movement	15,366	13.92	1
State of Law Coalition	11,277	10.22	1
Sadrist Movement	6,493	5.88	1
Alliance of Nation State Forces	4,850	4.39	–
Rights Movement	4,302	3.90	–
Fatah Alliance	3,733	3.38	–
Independent	2,994	2.71	–
National Contract Alliance	2,097	1.90	–
Rescuers	2,090	1.89	–
Independent	1,809	1.64	–
Emtidad Movement	1,697	1.54	–
National Approach Alliance	1,655	1.50	–
Eqtadar Watan Party	1,590	1.44	–
Independent	1,509	1.37	–
Ishraqat Kanoon	1,317	1.19	–
People's Parliament Assembly	1,175	1.06	–
Independent	1,163	1.05	–
Independent	1,107	1.00	–
Independent	1,084	0.98	–
Alliance of Nation State Forces	767	0.70	–
National Awareness Movement	751	0.68	–
Qadimun	641	0.58	–
National Contract Alliance	629	0.57	–
Capable Coalition	606	0.55	–
Alliance of Nation State Forces	542	0.49	–
Qadimun	467	0.42	–
Rights Movement	461	0.42	–
National Depth Alliance	341	0.31	–
Iraqi Loyalty Movement	326	0.30	–
National Tribal Movement in Iraq	307	0.28	–
Iraq Shield Bloc	284	0.26	–
Homeland Safety Coalition	276	0.25	–
Construction and Reform Rally	245	0.22	–
Iraqi National Movement	238	0.22	–
Qadimun	190	0.17	–
Tyar Al-Tahady	178	0.16	–
Iraqi Promise	133	0.12	–
Total	110,355	100.00	5
Valid votes	104,745	90.61	
Invalid/blank votes	10,861	9.39	
Total votes	115,606	100.00	
Registered voters/turnout	332,926	34.72	

District 4
Party	Votes	%	Seats
Sadrist Movement	18,026	22.01	1
State of Law Coalition	14,182	17.32	1
Sadrist Movement	13,548	16.54	1
Sadrist Movement	6,342	7.74	1
Rights Movement	4,924	6.01	–
Fatah Alliance	4,916	6.00	–
Alliance of Nation State Forces	2,907	3.55	–
Emtidad Movement	1,924	2.35	–
Eqtadar Watan Party	1,668	2.04	–
Alliance of Nation State Forces	1,394	1.70	–
Independent	1,386	1.69	–
National Certainty Party	1,196	1.46	–
Independent	954	1.16	–
National Contract Alliance	854	1.04	–
National Approach Alliance	776	0.95	–
Furatayn Movement	628	0.77	–
Independent	618	0.75	–
Qadimun	610	0.74	–
Eqtadar Watan Party	540	0.66	–
National Depth Alliance	504	0.62	–
People's Parliament Assembly	483	0.59	–
National Tribal Movement in Iraq	469	0.57	–
Al-Faw Zakho Coalition	455	0.56	–
Kafa Movement	420	0.51	–
Rescuers	395	0.48	–
Iraq Shield Bloc	341	0.42	–
Professionals Party for Reconstruction	309	0.38	–
Kafa Movement	259	0.32	–
Iraqi Loyalty Movement	247	0.30	–
Civic Party	224	0.27	–
National Sacrifice Block	188	0.23	–
Construction and Reform Rally	146	0.18	–
Iraqi National Loyalty Party	60	0.07	–
Total	81,893	100.00	4
Valid votes	81,810	91.78	
Invalid/blank votes	7,328	8.22	
Total votes	89,138	100.00	
Registered voters/turnout	259,046	34.41	

District 5
Party	Votes	%	Seats
State of Law Coalition	9,029	12.56	1
Sadrist Movement	8,390	11.67	1
Sadrist Movement	7,441	10.35	1
Independent	5,385	7.49	1
Emtidad Movement	4,053	5.64	–
Alliance of Nation State Forces	3,645	5.07	–
Fatah Alliance	3,513	4.89	–
Professionals Party for Reconstruction	3,473	4.83	–
National Approach Alliance	2,919	4.06	–
Eqtadar Watan Party	2,786	3.88	–
Rights Movement	2,512	3.49	–
Progress Party	2,034	2.83	–
Alliance of Nation State Forces	1,533	2.13	–
State of Law Coalition	1,238	1.72	–
Independent	1,223	1.70	–
Civil Democratic Alliance	1,062	1.48	–
Independent	994	1.38	–
Independent	712	0.99	–
Independent	643	0.89	–
New Iraq Gathering	624	0.87	–
Al-Faw Zakho Coalition	608	0.85	–
Independent	557	0.77	–
Independents Bloc	520	0.72	–
National Certainty Party	494	0.69	–
Achievement Movement	464	0.65	–
Iraqi National Movement	456	0.63	–
Tasmim Alliance	452	0.63	–
Independent	451	0.63	–
National Sacrifice Block	425	0.59	–
Independent	392	0.55	–
Qadimun	388	0.54	–
Ḥarakat Nāzl Akhdh Ḥaqqī al-Dīmuqrāṭīyah	343	0.48	–
New Generation Movement	324	0.45	–
Iraqi Loyalty Movement	312	0.43	–
Tishreen National Gathering	259	0.36	–
New Iraq Gathering	255	0.35	–
Construction and Reform Rally	253	0.35	–
Tyar Al-Tahady	251	0.35	–
Qadimun	236	0.33	–
New Iraq Gathering	185	0.26	–
Homeland Safety Coalition	153	0.21	–
National Sacrifice Block	123	0.17	–
Al-Daae Party	122	0.17	–
National Product Party	111	0.15	–
Tyar Al-Tahady	104	0.14	–
Al-Wataniya	99	0.14	–
Tasmim Alliance	80	0.11	–
Qadimun	74	0.10	–
Professionals Party for Reconstruction	74	0.10	–
Independent	63	0.09	–
Eqtadar Watan Party	46	0.06	–
Total	71,883	100.00	4
Valid votes	87,411	86.33	
Invalid/blank votes	13,841	13.67	
Total votes	101,252	100.00	
Registered voters/turnout	361,245	28.03	

District 6
Party	Votes	%	Seats
Azem Alliance	7,074	11.53	1
Sadrist Movement	6,118	9.97	1
State of Law Coalition	5,032	8.20	1
Azem Alliance	4,538	7.40	1
National Contract Alliance	4,535	7.39	–
Progress Party	3,347	5.45	–
Fatah Alliance	3,037	4.95	–
Azem Alliance	2,661	4.34	–
Emtidad Movement	2,452	4.00	–
Al-Aerobion Party	2,048	3.34	–
Al-Faw Zakho Coalition	1,947	3.17	–
Kurdistan Democratic Party	1,777	2.90	–
Iraqi National Movement	1,774	2.89	–
Alliance of Nation State Forces	1,561	2.54	–
National Party of the Masses	1,439	2.35	–
Progress Party	1,394	2.27	–
Progress Party	1,330	2.17	–
United for Iraq	1,288	2.10	–
Professionals Party for Reconstruction	888	1.45	–
Qadimun	634	1.03	–
Iraqi Republican Group Party	550	0.90	–
Independent	503	0.82	–
Rescuers	492	0.80	–
Iraqi Economy Alliance/Economists	421	0.69	–
National Certainty Party	369	0.60	–
Eqtadar Watan Party	342	0.56	–
National Certainty Party	262	0.43	–
National Tribal Movement in Iraq	258	0.42	–
Alliance of Civilian Forces	230	0.37	–
Tishreen National Gathering	208	0.34	–
National Correction Party	189	0.31	–
National Contract Alliance	181	0.29	–
Independent	176	0.29	–
Alliance of Nation State Forces	176	0.29	–
Qadimun	163	0.27	–
Achievement Movement	160	0.26	–
Voices of the Masses Gathering	160	0.26	–
Gathering of Talents and Masses	152	0.25	–
Qadimun	148	0.24	–
National Sacrifice Block	145	0.24	–
National Depth Alliance	140	0.23	–
Iraqi Loyalty Movement	137	0.22	–
Iraqi Republican Group Party	122	0.20	–
Iraq Shield Bloc	105	0.17	–
Iraqi Loyalty Movement	101	0.16	–
Civic Party	94	0.15	–
Educators' Gathering	72	0.12	–
Tyar Al-Tahady	70	0.11	–
Coalition of Iraqi Unity	62	0.10	–
Independent	60	0.10	–
Al-Atifak Iraqi National Party	44	0.07	–
Al-Wataniya	41	0.07	–
Civic Party	34	0.06	–
Arab Levant Party	34	0.06	–
Educators' Gathering	34	0.06	–
New Generation Movement	24	0.04	–
Conservatives	24	0.04	–
Total	61,357	100.00	4
Valid votes	63,901	88.94	
Invalid/blank votes	7,948	11.06	
Total votes	71,849	100.00	
Registered voters/turnout	252,208	28.49	

District 7
Party	Votes	%	Seats
Sadrist Movement	8,969	13.57	1
State of Law Coalition	5,814	8.80	1
Furatayn Movement	5,333	8.07	1
Sadrist Movement	4,092	6.19	1
Alliance of Nation State Forces	4,062	6.15	–
Independent	3,781	5.72	–
State of Law Coalition	3,294	4.98	–
Fatah Alliance	3,220	4.87	–
Progress Party	3,205	4.85	–
Ishraqat Kanoon	2,882	4.36	–
Independent	2,835	4.29	–
Emtidad Movement	2,820	4.27	–
Rights Movement	2,201	3.33	–
Independent	986	1.49	–
National Approach Alliance	930	1.41	–
Independent	886	1.34	–
Kafa Movement	848	1.28	–
National Tribal Movement in Iraq	807	1.22	–
Alliance of Nation State Forces	706	1.07	–
Independent	651	0.98	–
Al-Wataniya	635	0.96	–
Qadimun	624	0.94	–
People's Parliament Assembly	581	0.88	–
Educators' Gathering	531	0.80	–
National Certainty Party	459	0.69	–
Independent	449	0.68	–
Al-Faw Zakho Coalition	363	0.55	–
Qadimun	329	0.50	–
Tishreen National Gathering	316	0.48	–
Rescuers	316	0.48	–
National Depth Alliance	288	0.44	–
New Iraq Gathering	274	0.41	–
National Awareness Movement	243	0.37	–
Independent	232	0.35	–
Independent	227	0.34	–
Tayyār al-Kalimah	227	0.34	–
Construction and Reform Rally	201	0.30	–
National Tribal Movement in Iraq	195	0.30	–
Ḥarakat Nāzl Akhdh Ḥaqqī al-Dīmuqrāṭīyah	191	0.29	–
Civic Party	171	0.26	–
Iraqi Economy Alliance/Economists	168	0.25	–
National Sacrifice Block	121	0.18	–
Homeland Safety Coalition	106	0.16	–
Qadimun	98	0.15	–
Iraqi National Loyalty Party	97	0.15	–
Iraq Shield Bloc	96	0.15	–
Independent	89	0.13	–
Conservatives	89	0.13	–
Qadimun	55	0.08	–
Total	66,093	100.00	4
Valid votes	62,788	89.15	
Invalid/blank votes	7,641	10.85	
Total votes	70,429	100.00	
Registered voters/turnout	257,686	27.33	

District 8
Party	Votes	%	Seats
State of Law Coalition	9,215	15.36	1
Independent	8,621	14.37	1
Sadrist Movement	5,992	9.99	–
Independent	4,493	7.49	–
Alliance of Nation State Forces	3,496	5.83	–
Azem Alliance	3,232	5.39	–
Fatah Alliance	2,462	4.10	1
Sadrist Movement	2,361	3.94	–
National Awareness Movement	2,150	3.58	–
Professionals Party for Reconstruction	2,046	3.41	–
Alliance of Nation State Forces	1,639	2.73	–
Kurdistani Coalition	1,268	2.11	–
Wathiqoon	1,004	1.67	–
Qadimun	883	1.47	–
Al-Faw Zakho Coalition	853	1.42	–
Independent	802	1.34	–
Qadimun	745	1.24	–
Independent	738	1.23	–
Ḥarakat Nāzl Akhdh Ḥaqqī al-Dīmuqrāṭīyah	637	1.06	–
Capable Coalition	500	0.83	–
Eqtadar Watan Party	491	0.82	–
Independent	453	0.76	–
Furatayn Movement	428	0.71	–
Tishreen National Gathering	427	0.71	–
Azem Alliance	372	0.62	–
National Approach Alliance	368	0.61	–
Homeland Safety Coalition	360	0.60	–
Qadimun	346	0.58	–
Civic Party	345	0.58	–
Iraqi Loyalty Movement	330	0.55	–
Independent	316	0.53	–
Civil Democratic Alliance	304	0.51	–
Capable Coalition	267	0.45	–
Homeland Safety Coalition	258	0.43	–
Homeland Safety Coalition	231	0.39	–
Capable Coalition	227	0.38	–
Rescuers	200	0.33	–
National Sacrifice Block	181	0.30	–
Achievement Movement	152	0.25	–
Voices of the Masses Gathering	152	0.25	–
Kafa Movement	117	0.20	–
National Sacrifice Block	101	0.17	–
Tayyār al-Kalimah	93	0.16	–
New Generation Movement	88	0.15	–
Civil Democratic Alliance	81	0.14	–
Iraqi National Movement	61	0.10	–
Rescuers	59	0.10	–
National Sacrifice Block	32	0.05	–
Total	59,977	100.00	3
Valid votes	76,004	86.68	
Invalid/blank votes	11,681	13.32	
Total votes	87,685	100.00	
Registered voters/turnout	300,762	29.15	

District 9
Party	Votes	%	Seats
State of Law Coalition	16,979	18.64	1
Sadrist Movement	14,792	16.24	1
Sadrist Movement	11,117	12.20	1
Sadrist Movement	7,603	8.35	1
Fatah Alliance	7,331	8.05	–
Qadimun	5,700	6.26	–
Independent	3,552	3.90	–
National Approach Alliance	3,092	3.39	–
National Contract Alliance	3,038	3.33	–
Emtidad Movement	2,609	2.86	–
Alliance of Nation State Forces	2,470	2.71	–
Rights Movement	1,997	2.19	–
Independent	1,103	1.21	–
National Party of the Masses	945	1.04	–
Alliance of Nation State Forces	878	0.96	–
Independent	653	0.72	–
Furatayn Movement	605	0.66	–
Eqtadar Watan Party	541	0.59	–
Iraqi Loyalty Movement	487	0.53	–
Iraqi Loyalty Movement	477	0.52	–
Independent	430	0.47	–
Qadimun	417	0.46	–
New Generation Movement	398	0.44	–
Qadimun	383	0.42	–
Ishraqat Kanoon	358	0.39	–
Independent	332	0.36	–
Al-Faw Zakho Coalition	307	0.34	–
Eqtadar Watan Party	306	0.34	–
Alliance of Nation State Forces	271	0.30	–
National Certainty Party	260	0.29	–
Rights Movement	255	0.28	–
Al-Nour Movement - Uprising and Change	250	0.27	–
National Certainty Party	248	0.27	–
Civic Party	205	0.23	–
Civic Party	173	0.19	–
National Tribal Movement in Iraq	145	0.16	–
Civil Democratic Alliance	144	0.16	–
Qadimun	130	0.14	–
Gathering of Talents and Masses	118	0.13	–
Total	91,099	100.00	4
Valid votes	86,886	93.00	
Invalid/blank votes	6,538	7.00	
Total votes	93,424	100.00	
Registered voters/turnout	261,243	35.76	

District 10
Party	Votes	%	Seats
Sadrist Movement	10,001	18.93	1
Azem Alliance	8,996	17.03	1
State of Law Coalition	8,810	16.67	–
Fatah Alliance	4,325	8.19	–
Sadrist Movement	3,273	6.19	1
Construction and Reform Rally	2,496	4.72	–
Ishraqat Kanoon	2,217	4.20	–
Independent	2,055	3.89	–
Furatayn Movement	1,276	2.42	–
Independent	1,257	2.38	–
Alliance of Nation State Forces	1,253	2.37	–
Educators' Gathering	1,050	1.99	–
Independent	796	1.51	–
Rescuers	621	1.18	–
Independent	595	1.13	–
Independent	524	0.99	–
Eqtadar Watan Party	456	0.86	–
Iraq Shield Bloc	391	0.74	–
Ḥarakat Nāzl Akhdh Ḥaqqī al-Dīmuqrāṭīyah	300	0.57	–
Qadimun	299	0.57	–
Qadimun	286	0.54	–
Independent	254	0.48	–
People's Parliament Assembly	235	0.44	–
Independent	229	0.43	–
Iraqi Economy Alliance/Economists	175	0.33	–
Alliance of Nation State Forces	152	0.29	–
Capable Coalition	144	0.27	–
Azem Alliance	135	0.26	–
Qadimun	106	0.20	–
Trust Party	75	0.14	–
Tayyār al-Kalimah	54	0.10	–
Total	52,836	100.00	3
Valid votes	52,322	91.14	
Invalid/blank votes	5,086	8.86	
Total votes	57,408	100.00	
Registered voters/turnout	179,200	32.04	

District 11
Party	Votes	%	Seats
State of Law Coalition	21,138	15.56	1
Sadrist Movement	12,483	9.19	1
Ishraqat Kanoon	8,993	6.62	1
Independent	8,403	6.18	1
Sadrist Movement	7,371	5.43	1
Fatah Alliance	5,992	4.41	–
Civic Party	5,513	4.06	–
National Contract Alliance	4,543	3.34	–
Rights Movement	4,130	3.04	–
Ḥarakat Nāzl Akhdh Ḥaqqī al-Dīmuqrāṭīyah	3,429	2.52	–
Emtidad Movement	3,416	2.51	–
Alliance of Nation State Forces	3,240	2.38	–
Progress Party	3,216	2.37	–
National Approach Alliance	3,131	2.30	–
Independent	2,954	2.17	–
Independent	2,857	2.10	–
Al-Nour Movement - Uprising and Change	2,590	1.91	–
Wathiqoon	2,472	1.82	–
Independent	2,021	1.49	–
Independents Bloc	1,810	1.33	–
Alliance of Nation State Forces	1,707	1.26	–
Iraqi Loyalty Movement	1,519	1.12	–
Rescuers	1,493	1.10	–
Capable Coalition	1,476	1.09	–
Independent	1,244	0.92	–
Independent	1,229	0.90	–
Independent	1,103	0.81	–
Azem Alliance	1,003	0.74	–
Qadimun	925	0.68	–
Independent	904	0.67	–
Al-Faw Zakho Coalition	900	0.66	–
Independent	820	0.60	–
Al-Wataniya	802	0.59	–
The Blessed Shaaban Uprising/Iraq's Call	785	0.58	–
Independent	749	0.55	–
Independent	715	0.53	–
Educators' Gathering	634	0.47	–
Independent	603	0.44	–
Construction and Reform Rally	557	0.41	–
Homeland Safety Coalition	477	0.35	–
Tyar Al-Tahady	466	0.34	–
Furatayn Movement	450	0.33	–
Independent	410	0.30	–
Qadimun	410	0.30	–
Alliance of Civilian Forces	404	0.30	–
Iraqi Loyalty Movement	402	0.30	–
Ishraqat Kanoon	319	0.23	–
Tasmim Alliance	270	0.20	–
Iraqi Economy Alliance/Economists	269	0.20	–
Conservatives	241	0.18	–
Al-Wataniya	239	0.18	–
National Party of the Masses	229	0.17	–
Independent	229	0.17	–
Azem Alliance	229	0.17	–
Al-Wataniya	196	0.14	–
Iraqi Loyalty Movement	184	0.14	–
Achievement Movement	177	0.13	–
Azem Alliance	167	0.12	–
Tayyār al-Kalimah	164	0.12	–
Achievement Movement	161	0.12	–
Voices of the Masses Gathering	157	0.12	–
Al-Daae Party	155	0.11	–
Tishreen National Gathering	150	0.11	–
Banners of Benevolence	133	0.10	–
National Certainty Party	130	0.10	–
Civil Democratic Alliance	104	0.08	–
Iraqi National Movement	73	0.05	–
Total	135,865	100.00	5
Valid votes	132,179	90.12	
Invalid/blank votes	14,499	9.88	
Total votes	146,678	100.00	
Registered voters/turnout	434,605	33.75	

District 12
Party	Votes	%	Seats
Progress Party	7,234	7.36	1
State of Law Coalition	6,934	7.05	1
Independent	5,110	5.20	1
Independent	4,231	4.30	1
Sadrist Movement	3,920	3.99	–
Sadrist Movement	3,798	3.86	1
Azem Alliance	3,747	3.81	–
Fatah Alliance	3,649	3.71	–
Azem Alliance	3,618	3.68	–
Independent	3,435	3.49	–
Emtidad Movement	3,384	3.44	–
Azem Alliance	3,043	3.09	–
Progress Party	2,901	2.95	–
Al-Wataniya	2,592	2.64	–
Kurdistani Coalition	2,335	2.37	–
Alliance of Nation State Forces	2,282	2.32	–
Gathering of Talents and Masses	2,275	2.31	–
Independent	2,248	2.29	–
Independent	1,991	2.02	–
Iraqi Loyalty Movement	1,943	1.98	–
Azem Alliance	1,358	1.38	–
Ishraqat Kanoon	1,269	1.29	–
Progress Party	1,111	1.13	–
Al-Faw Zakho Coalition	1,098	1.12	–
Independent	1,044	1.06	–
Elite Party	1,027	1.04	–
National Depth Alliance	1,001	1.02	–
Alliance of Nation State Forces	994	1.01	–
Independent	969	0.99	–
Alliance of Nation State Forces	876	0.89	–
Iraqi Loyalty Movement	835	0.85	–
Independent	802	0.82	–
Azem Alliance	747	0.76	–
Rescuers	729	0.74	–
Azem Alliance	610	0.62	–
Iraqi Loyalty Movement	606	0.62	–
National Contract Alliance	579	0.59	–
Furatayn Movement	570	0.58	–
Youth Movement for Change	569	0.58	–
State of Law Coalition	484	0.49	–
Tayyār al-Kalimah	479	0.49	–
Tishreen National Gathering	465	0.47	–
Ḥarakat Nāzl Akhdh Ḥaqqī al-Dīmuqrāṭīyah	458	0.47	–
Independent	455	0.46	–
Independent	414	0.42	–
Civil Democratic Alliance	406	0.41	–
Independent	399	0.41	–
Al-Atifak Iraqi National Party	379	0.39	–
Iraqi National Project	373	0.38	–
Iraq is our Identity	366	0.37	–
Independent	327	0.33	–
Alliance of Nation State Forces	293	0.30	–
Independent	291	0.30	–
National Depth Alliance	285	0.29	–
Eqtadar Watan Party	283	0.29	–
Independent	274	0.28	–
Iraqi Civil Society Gathering	215	0.22	–
Educators' Gathering	215	0.22	–
United for Iraq	214	0.22	–
Educators' Gathering	214	0.22	–
Dialogue and Change Party	198	0.20	–
Al-Aerobion Party	197	0.20	–
Independent	196	0.20	–
United for Iraq	190	0.19	–
Rescuers	169	0.17	–
Construction and Reform Rally	164	0.17	–
Iraqi National Movement	149	0.15	–
Construction and Reform Rally	146	0.15	–
Alliance of Nation State Forces	143	0.15	–
National Party of the Masses	141	0.14	–
Rights Movement	139	0.14	–
Al-Atifak Iraqi National Party	130	0.13	–
Iraqi Economy Alliance/Economists	130	0.13	–
United for Iraq	117	0.12	–
National Certainty Party	113	0.11	–
National Correction Party	109	0.11	–
Conservatives	101	0.10	–
Alliance of Nation State Forces	99	0.10	–
Qadimun	96	0.10	–
Independent	91	0.09	–
Al-Aerobion Party	87	0.09	–
Iraqi National Movement	85	0.09	–
Elite Party	82	0.08	–
United for Iraq	67	0.07	–
National Contract Alliance	67	0.07	–
Tayyār al-Kalimah	65	0.07	–
Alliance of Civilian Forces	64	0.07	–
Iraqi National Project	61	0.06	–
Qadimun	57	0.06	–
National Awareness Movement	48	0.05	–
Iraqi National Project	42	0.04	–
Iraqi Republican Group Party	41	0.04	–
Total	98,337	100.00	5
Valid votes	133,433	87.49	
Invalid/blank votes	19,086	12.51	
Total votes	152,519	100.00	
Registered voters/turnout	475,168	32.10	

District 13
Party	Votes	%	Seats
Azem Alliance	9,226	10.58	1
Azem Alliance	7,470	8.57	1
Progress Party	6,814	7.81	1
Iraqi National Project	6,656	7.63	–
Progress Party	4,915	5.64	1
Progress Party	4,337	4.97	–
Progress Party	4,087	4.69	–
Alliance of Nation State Forces	3,126	3.58	–
Azem Alliance	3,009	3.45	–
Independent	2,782	3.19	–
Independent	2,510	2.88	–
Progress Party	2,303	2.64	–
State of Law Coalition	2,235	2.56	–
Independent	2,182	2.50	–
Al-Wataniya	2,155	2.47	–
Azem Alliance	2,076	2.38	–
Azem Alliance	1,990	2.28	–
National Contract Alliance	1,974	2.26	–
Wathiqoon	1,810	2.08	–
Iraqi National Project	1,504	1.72	–
Independent	1,444	1.66	–
United for Iraq	1,283	1.47	–
Independent	1,181	1.35	–
Independent	1,008	1.16	–
Alliance of Nation State Forces	850	0.97	–
State of Law Coalition	653	0.75	–
Emtidad Movement	626	0.72	–
National Party of the Masses	587	0.67	–
Independent	581	0.67	–
Coalition of Iraqi Unity	485	0.56	–
Iraqi Loyalty Movement	474	0.54	–
Independent	388	0.44	–
National Product Party	346	0.40	–
National Approach Alliance	324	0.37	–
Qadimun	282	0.32	–
National Awareness Movement	280	0.32	–
Independent	244	0.28	–
Ḥarakat Nāzl Akhdh Ḥaqqī al-Dīmuqrāṭīyah	227	0.26	–
Iraqi Economy Alliance/Economists	224	0.26	–
Independent	189	0.22	–
Progress Party	188	0.22	–
Iraqi Loyalty Movement	185	0.21	–
Professionals Party for Reconstruction	185	0.21	–
Iraqi National Movement	184	0.21	–
Qadimun	176	0.20	–
Iraqi Loyalty Movement	167	0.19	–
Independent	162	0.19	–
Professionals Party for Reconstruction	160	0.18	–
New Generation Movement	127	0.15	–
Trust Party	126	0.14	–
Qadimun	115	0.13	–
Al-Faw Zakho Coalition	97	0.11	–
Alliance of Nation State Forces	95	0.11	–
Alliance of Civilian Forces	53	0.06	–
Rescuers	51	0.06	–
Qadimun	50	0.06	–
National Sacrifice Block	35	0.04	–
Gathering of Talents and Masses	34	0.04	–
Al-Atifak Iraqi National Party	34	0.04	–
Tayyār al-Kalimah	34	0.04	–
Independent	30	0.03	–
United for Iraq	25	0.03	–
Independent	21	0.02	–
Voices of the Masses Gathering	15	0.02	–
Iraqi Loyalty Movement	13	0.01	–
Total	87,199	100.00	4
Valid votes	95,246	94.47	
Invalid/blank votes	5,577	5.53	
Total votes	100,823	100.00	
Registered voters/turnout	248,205	40.62	

District 14
Party	Votes	%	Seats
Progress Party	9,132	10.47	1
State of Law Coalition	8,254	9.47	1
Sadrist Movement	7,997	9.17	1
Progress Party	5,822	6.68	1
Progress Party	4,600	5.28	1
Independent	4,403	5.05	–
Independent	4,277	4.90	–
Fatah Alliance	3,865	4.43	–
Azem Alliance	3,207	3.68	–
Professionals Party for Reconstruction	2,414	2.77	–
Dialogue and Change Party	2,212	2.54	–
Emtidad Movement	1,903	2.18	–
Progress Party	1,766	2.03	–
Alliance of Nation State Forces	1,546	1.77	–
Azem Alliance	1,444	1.66	–
Tayyār al-Kalimah	1,433	1.64	–
Rights Movement	1,264	1.45	–
National Contract Alliance	1,225	1.40	–
Alliance of Nation State Forces	1,165	1.34	–
Independent	1,116	1.28	–
Independent	1,039	1.19	–
Azem Alliance	1,009	1.16	–
Emtidad Movement	977	1.12	–
Independent	966	1.11	–
Al-Wataniya	911	1.04	–
People's Parliament Assembly	844	0.97	–
Independent	712	0.82	–
National Majority Movement	705	0.81	–
National Tribal Movement in Iraq	671	0.77	–
Wathiqoon	663	0.76	–
Al-Faw Zakho Coalition	663	0.76	–
Iraq Shield Bloc	575	0.66	–
Azem Alliance	547	0.63	–
Alliance of Nation State Forces	537	0.62	–
United for Iraq	515	0.59	–
National Awareness Movement	509	0.58	–
Homeland Safety Coalition	348	0.40	–
Iraqi Loyalty Movement	318	0.36	–
National Awareness Movement	317	0.36	–
National Approach Alliance	312	0.36	–
Voices of the Masses Gathering	307	0.35	–
Qadimun	302	0.35	–
Independent	263	0.30	–
Youth Movement for Change	260	0.30	–
Azem Alliance	240	0.28	–
Ḥarakat Nāzl Akhdh Ḥaqqī al-Dīmuqrāṭīyah	238	0.27	–
Eqtadar Watan Party	238	0.27	–
Capable Coalition	209	0.24	–
Qadimun	193	0.22	–
National Party of the Masses	183	0.21	–
Gathering of Talents and Masses	179	0.21	–
New Iraq Gathering	175	0.20	–
National Depth Alliance	173	0.20	–
Civic Party	166	0.19	–
Independent	134	0.15	–
Al-Aerobion Party	125	0.14	–
Alliance of Civilian Forces	124	0.14	–
United for Iraq	118	0.14	–
Iraqi Loyalty Movement	116	0.13	–
National Certainty Party	115	0.13	–
Unified Iraqi Democratic Council	110	0.13	–
Independent	108	0.12	–
Alliance of Nation State Forces	98	0.11	–
Al-Wataniya	96	0.11	–
Iraqi Economy Alliance/Economists	91	0.10	–
Independent	87	0.10	–
National Party of the Masses	84	0.10	–
New Iraq Gathering	80	0.09	–
Voices of the Masses Gathering	76	0.09	–
Arab Levant Party	68	0.08	–
National Party of the Masses	64	0.07	–
Independent	62	0.07	–
Elite Party	51	0.06	–
Qadimun	42	0.05	–
Al-Wataniya	39	0.04	–
Total	87,197	100.00	5
Valid votes	89,505	91.20	
Invalid/blank votes	8,633	8.80	
Total votes	98,138	100.00	
Registered voters/turnout	313,404	31.31	

District 15
Party	Votes	%	Seats
Sadrist Movement	9,439	14.21	1
State of Law Coalition	9,070	13.66	1
Rights Movement	4,678	7.04	1
Fatah Alliance	4,176	6.29	1
Iraqi National Movement	3,601	5.42	–
Emtidad Movement	3,316	4.99	–
Progress Party	2,928	4.41	–
Independent	2,318	3.49	–
Independent	2,236	3.37	–
National Sacrifice Block	1,649	2.48	–
Alliance of Nation State Forces	1,632	2.46	–
Independent	1,597	2.41	–
Professionals Party for Reconstruction	1,529	2.30	–
National Hopes Bloc	1,365	2.06	–
Eqtadar Watan Party	1,338	2.01	–
Independent	1,191	1.79	–
Al-Atifak Iraqi National Party	1,143	1.72	–
Independent	1,128	1.70	–
National Approach Alliance	944	1.42	–
Achievement Movement	861	1.30	–
Alliance of Nation State Forces	769	1.16	–
Ishraqat Kanoon	726	1.09	–
National Depth Alliance	694	1.05	–
Al-Faw Zakho Coalition	686	1.03	–
Tayyār al-Kalimah	682	1.03	–
Civic Party	548	0.83	–
Furatayn Movement	536	0.81	–
Alliance of Nation State Forces	467	0.70	–
Independent	444	0.67	–
Righteous Front	425	0.64	–
Homeland Safety Coalition	397	0.60	–
Tayyār al-Kalimah	359	0.54	–
Achievement Movement	312	0.47	–
Azem Alliance	300	0.45	–
National Contract Alliance	284	0.43	–
Iraqi Loyalty Movement	251	0.38	–
Conservatives	184	0.28	–
Civic Party	183	0.28	–
Iraqi National Movement	182	0.27	–
Al-Wataniya	181	0.27	–
National Sacrifice Block	177	0.27	–
Qadimun	154	0.23	–
Alliance of Civilian Forces	152	0.23	–
Construction and Reform Rally	149	0.22	–
Voices of the Masses Gathering	143	0.22	–
Biladi National Movement	137	0.21	–
Rescuers	134	0.20	–
Qadimun	111	0.17	–
Qadimun	110	0.17	–
Rescuers	104	0.16	–
Capable Coalition	89	0.13	–
Kafa Movement	76	0.11	–
National Sacrifice Block	67	0.10	–
Voices of the Masses Gathering	51	0.08	–
Total	66,403	100.00	4
Valid votes	66,337	88.07	
Invalid/blank votes	8,986	11.93	
Total votes	75,323	100.00	
Registered voters/turnout	289,114	26.05	

District 16
Party	Votes	%	Seats
Progress Party	17,830	22.95	1
Azem Alliance	9,841	12.67	1
National Party of the Masses	6,815	8.77	–
Azem Alliance	6,191	7.97	–
Sadrist Movement	4,689	6.04	–
Independent	4,263	5.49	–
Progress Party	4,076	5.25	1
Independents Bloc	2,886	3.72	–
State of Law Coalition	2,715	3.50	–
Azem Alliance	2,362	3.04	–
Independent	1,912	2.46	–
Alliance of Nation State Forces	1,538	1.98	–
Fatah Alliance	1,420	1.83	–
Furatayn Movement	1,071	1.38	–
National Awareness Movement	1,063	1.37	–
Independent	1,024	1.32	–
Independent	951	1.22	–
Azem Alliance	918	1.18	–
Independent	916	1.18	–
National Product Party	647	0.83	–
Qadimun	584	0.75	–
Qadimun	386	0.50	–
National Correction Party	386	0.50	–
Independent	353	0.45	–
Iraqi National Project	341	0.44	–
National Approach Alliance	307	0.40	–
Iraqi Loyalty Movement	263	0.34	–
Kafa Movement	261	0.34	–
Iraqi Republican Group Party	232	0.30	–
National Certainty Party	213	0.27	–
Tasmim Alliance	206	0.27	–
Independent	195	0.25	–
Youth Movement for Change	176	0.23	–
Tishreen National Gathering	147	0.19	–
National Awareness Movement	105	0.14	–
Qadimun	98	0.13	–
Tayyār al-Kalimah	89	0.11	–
Al-Faw Zakho Coalition	87	0.11	–
Al-Atifak Iraqi National Party	56	0.07	–
Iraqi Republican Group Party	35	0.05	–
Civic Party	27	0.03	–
Total	77,675	100.00	3
Valid votes	92,365	93.04	
Invalid/blank votes	6,906	6.96	
Total votes	99,271	100.00	
Registered voters/turnout	217,319	45.68	

District 17
Party	Votes	%	Seats
Azem Alliance	8,038	7.14	1
Sadrist Movement	6,467	5.74	1
Progress Party	6,377	5.66	1
Progress Party	6,285	5.58	1
National Contract Alliance	5,812	5.16	–
Azem Alliance	5,592	4.96	–
Iraqi National Project	4,530	4.02	–
Al-Wataniya	4,074	3.62	–
Qadimun	3,892	3.46	–
Progress Party	3,785	3.36	–
Progress Party	3,754	3.33	–
Independent	3,680	3.27	–
Azem Alliance	3,236	2.87	–
Fatah Alliance	3,061	2.72	–
State of Law Coalition	2,920	2.59	–
United for Iraq	2,760	2.45	–
Independent	2,435	2.16	–
Iraq is our Identity	2,105	1.87	–
Independent	2,017	1.79	–
Independent	1,889	1.68	–
Independent	1,856	1.65	–
Iraqi National Project	1,846	1.64	–
Alliance of Nation State Forces	1,843	1.64	–
Furatayn Movement	1,796	1.59	–
Independent	1,686	1.50	–
Alliance of Nation State Forces	1,649	1.46	–
Progress Party	1,640	1.46	–
Azem Alliance	1,492	1.32	–
Independent	1,272	1.13	–
Independent	1,268	1.13	–
Coalition of Iraqi Unity	1,015	0.90	–
Independent	1,004	0.89	–
Emtidad Movement	977	0.87	–
Youth Movement for Change	955	0.85	–
National Party of the Masses	882	0.78	–
National Depth Alliance	718	0.64	–
Qadimun	671	0.60	–
Independent	645	0.57	–
Al-Atifak Iraqi National Party	574	0.51	–
Azem Alliance	554	0.49	–
Alliance of Nation State Forces	495	0.44	–
Elite Party	471	0.42	–
Independent	438	0.39	–
Banners of Benevolence	402	0.36	–
Azem Alliance	399	0.35	–
Independent	348	0.31	–
United for Iraq	337	0.30	–
National Tribal Movement in Iraq	333	0.30	–
Biladi National Movement	309	0.27	–
National Product Party	306	0.27	–
National Approach Alliance	247	0.22	–
Qadimun	217	0.19	–
Iraqi Loyalty Movement	199	0.18	–
Achievement Movement	144	0.13	–
Al-Faw Zakho Coalition	141	0.13	–
Eqtadar Watan Party	133	0.12	–
Righteous Front	113	0.10	–
Alliance of Civilian Forces	102	0.09	–
Independent	101	0.09	–
National Unity Front	91	0.08	–
Qadimun	88	0.08	–
New Iraq Gathering	81	0.07	–
Iraqi Republican Group Party	46	0.04	–
Civil Democratic Alliance	37	0.03	–
Total	112,630	100.00	4
Valid votes	114,462	96.03	
Invalid/blank votes	4,728	3.97	
Total votes	119,190	100.00	
Registered voters/turnout	264,028	45.14	

Election results by district in Basra Governorate

District 1
Party	Votes	%	Seats
Tasmim Alliance	28,246	26.86	1
Sadrist Movement	13,125	12.48	1
Independent	8,399	7.99	1
Sadrist Movement	7,893	7.51	1
National Support Alliance	6,515	6.20	1
Independent	5,025	4.78	–
State of Law Coalition	4,270	4.06	–
National Approach Alliance	4,251	4.04	–
National Contract Alliance	3,969	3.77	–
Rights Movement	3,575	3.40	–
Alliance of Nation State Forces	3,232	3.07	–
Emtidad Movement	2,832	2.69	–
Al-Faw Zakho Coalition	1,286	1.22	–
Independent	1,283	1.22	–
National Contract Alliance	1,212	1.15	–
Tasmim Alliance	1,159	1.10	–
Eqtadar Watan Party	846	0.80	–
National Contract Alliance	795	0.76	–
Wathiqoon	747	0.71	–
Qadimun	639	0.61	–
Al-Nour Movement - Uprising and Change	578	0.55	–
Professionals Party for Reconstruction	569	0.54	–
National Depth Alliance	540	0.51	–
Qadimun	518	0.49	–
Independent	489	0.47	–
Rescuers	403	0.38	–
State of Law Coalition	389	0.37	–
Tasmim Alliance	377	0.36	–
Independent	372	0.35	–
Al-Wataniya	300	0.29	–
Tayyār al-Kalimah	202	0.19	–
Biladi National Movement	195	0.19	–
Iraqi National Loyalty Party	186	0.18	–
Qadimun	148	0.14	–
Educators' Gathering	143	0.14	–
Construction and Reform Rally	134	0.13	–
Iraqi Loyalty Movement	132	0.13	–
Iraqi Loyalty Movement	106	0.10	–
Alliance of Nation State Forces	73	0.07	–
Total	105,153	100.00	5
Valid votes	103,996	93.92	
Invalid/blank votes	6,734	6.08	
Total votes	110,730	100.00	
Registered voters/turnout	288,278	38.41	

District 2
Party	Votes	%	Seats
Fatah Alliance	21,633	16.28	1
Tasmim Alliance	14,707	11.07	1
Tasmim Alliance	8,801	6.63	1
Sadrist Movement	8,526	6.42	1
Al-Faw Zakho Coalition	7,999	6.02	–
State of Law Coalition	7,409	5.58	–
Sadrist Movement	7,114	5.36	1
Tasmim Alliance	5,197	3.91	–
National Contract Alliance	4,229	3.18	–
Emtidad Movement	4,107	3.09	–
National Approach Alliance	3,820	2.88	–
Eqtadar Watan Party	3,675	2.77	–
Iraqi Loyalty Movement	3,366	2.53	–
Independent	3,338	2.51	–
Thaar Allah Islamic Party	3,233	2.43	–
Alliance of Nation State Forces	3,045	2.29	–
Independent	2,536	1.91	–
National Contract Alliance	2,354	1.77	–
Independent	2,312	1.74	–
Iraqi Loyalty Movement	1,931	1.45	–
Professionals Party for Reconstruction	1,645	1.24	–
Qadimun	1,297	0.98	–
Professionals Party for Reconstruction	1,151	0.87	–
Eqtadar Watan Party	1,079	0.81	–
Independent	750	0.56	–
Islamic Loyalist Movement	736	0.55	–
Independent	730	0.55	–
Wathiqoon	704	0.53	–
Alliance of Nation State Forces	573	0.43	–
Confrontation	480	0.36	–
Biladi National Movement	417	0.31	–
National Approach Alliance	346	0.26	–
Biladi National Movement	309	0.23	–
Construction and Reform Rally	299	0.23	–
Qadimun	294	0.22	–
Al-Nour Movement - Uprising and Change	289	0.22	–
Biladi National Movement	283	0.21	–
Capable Coalition	251	0.19	–
National Awareness Movement	235	0.18	–
Homeland Safety Coalition	230	0.17	–
Furatayn Movement	224	0.17	–
National Depth Alliance	211	0.16	–
Rescuers	161	0.12	–
Rescuers	150	0.11	–
Qadimun	135	0.10	–
Iraqi Loyalty Movement	116	0.09	–
Qadimun	111	0.08	–
Construction and Reform Rally	104	0.08	–
Civil Democratic Alliance	104	0.08	–
Tyar Al-Tahady	99	0.07	–
Total	132,845	100.00	5
Valid votes	137,737	93.02	
Invalid/blank votes	10,328	6.98	
Total votes	148,065	100.00	
Registered voters/turnout	395,128	37.47	

District 3
Party	Votes	%	Seats
National Contract Alliance	8,973	9.22	1
Sadrist Movement	5,631	5.78	1
Fatah Alliance	5,181	5.32	1
National Approach Alliance	4,825	4.96	1
Sadrist Movement	4,643	4.77	–
Tasmim Alliance	4,618	4.74	–
Tasmim Alliance	4,538	4.66	–
Independent	4,421	4.54	–
Independent	4,197	4.31	–
National Product Party	4,028	4.14	–
State of Law Coalition	3,907	4.01	–
Rights Movement	3,784	3.89	–
National Contract Alliance	3,768	3.87	–
Independent	3,334	3.42	–
Alliance of Nation State Forces	3,307	3.40	–
Independent	3,273	3.36	–
Independent	3,096	3.18	–
Civil Democratic Alliance	2,698	2.77	–
Iraqi National Movement	2,694	2.77	–
Independent	2,207	2.27	–
Civil Democratic Alliance	2,107	2.16	–
Independent	1,859	1.91	–
Independent	1,634	1.68	–
Construction and Reform Rally	1,450	1.49	–
Thaar Allah Islamic Party	1,289	1.32	–
Al-Faw Zakho Coalition	1,008	1.04	–
National Depth Alliance	880	0.90	–
Tayyār al-Kalimah	631	0.65	–
Independent	569	0.58	–
Thaar Allah Islamic Party	562	0.58	–
Qadimun	383	0.39	–
State of Law Coalition	357	0.37	–
Independents Bloc	347	0.36	–
Rescuers	337	0.35	–
Eqtadar Watan Party	270	0.28	–
Iraqi Loyalty Movement	178	0.18	–
Independent	167	0.17	–
Alliance of Nation State Forces	140	0.14	–
Biladi National Movement	48	0.05	–
Al-Faw Zakho Coalition	27	0.03	–
Total	97,366	100.00	4
Valid votes	95,765	95.82	
Invalid/blank votes	4,182	4.18	
Total votes	99,947	100.00	
Registered voters/turnout	201,072	49.71	

District 4
Party	Votes	%	Seats
Alliance of Nation State Forces	9,901	9.36	1
Sadrist Movement	7,130	6.74	1
Fatah Alliance	6,796	6.43	1
Independent	6,782	6.41	–
State of Law Coalition	6,427	6.08	–
National Contract Alliance	5,825	5.51	–
Independent	5,252	4.97	–
Eqtadar Watan Party	4,745	4.49	–
Independent	4,714	4.46	–
Independent	4,613	4.36	–
Tasmim Alliance	4,145	3.92	–
Independent	4,141	3.92	–
Tasmim Alliance	2,770	2.62	–
Biladi National Movement	2,656	2.51	1
National Approach Alliance	2,527	2.39	–
Rights Movement	2,440	2.31	–
Tasmim Alliance	2,345	2.22	–
Independent	2,295	2.17	–
Al-Wataniya	2,167	2.05	–
Progress Party	1,768	1.67	–
Al-Wataniya	1,742	1.65	–
National Contract Alliance	1,707	1.61	–
Qadimun	1,557	1.47	–
Alliance of Nation State Forces	1,525	1.44	–
Independent	1,391	1.32	–
Independent	1,201	1.14	–
Independent	895	0.85	–
Independent	822	0.78	–
National Approach Alliance	757	0.72	–
Qadimun	713	0.67	–
Al-Faw Zakho Coalition	561	0.53	–
National Awareness Movement	549	0.52	–
Al-Nour Movement - Uprising and Change	452	0.43	–
Iraqi Loyalty Movement	397	0.38	–
Civic Party	283	0.27	–
Independent	260	0.25	–
National Sacrifice Block	250	0.24	–
Iraqi National Movement	234	0.22	–
Rescuers	216	0.20	–
Qadimun	168	0.16	–
Righteous Front	165	0.16	–
National Certainty Party	138	0.13	–
Alliance of Nation State Forces	92	0.09	–
Iraqi National Loyalty Party	91	0.09	–
Construction and Reform Rally	84	0.08	–
Iraqi Communist Party	70	0.07	–
Total	105,759	100.00	4
Valid votes	116,145	94.10	
Invalid/blank votes	7,287	5.90	
Total votes	123,432	100.00	
Registered voters/turnout	293,982	41.99	

District 5
Party	Votes	%	Seats
Independent	15,048	13.61	1
State of Law Coalition	11,674	10.56	1
Sadrist Movement	10,188	9.22	1
Tasmim Alliance	7,902	7.15	–
Alliance of Nation State Forces	7,115	6.44	–
National Approach Alliance	6,588	5.96	–
Sadrist Movement	5,879	5.32	1
Fatah Alliance	4,982	4.51	–
National Product Party	4,911	4.44	–
Qadimun	4,688	4.24	–
Rights Movement	4,438	4.01	–
National Approach Alliance	4,280	3.87	–
Independent	3,940	3.56	–
Alliance of Nation State Forces	3,913	3.54	–
Tasmim Alliance	2,488	2.25	–
National Contract Alliance	2,283	2.07	–
Iraqi National Movement	1,730	1.57	–
Independent	1,650	1.49	–
Professionals Party for Reconstruction	1,620	1.47	–
Al-Faw Zakho Coalition	1,555	1.41	–
Eqtadar Watan Party	961	0.87	–
Iraqi National Loyalty Party	828	0.75	–
National Contract Alliance	514	0.47	–
Independent	497	0.45	–
Biladi National Movement	362	0.33	–
Al-Nour Movement - Uprising and Change	266	0.24	–
Independent	164	0.15	–
Rescuers	72	0.07	–
Total	110,536	100.00	4
Valid votes	114,490	96.03	
Invalid/blank votes	4,732	3.97	
Total votes	119,222	100.00	
Registered voters/turnout	237,041	50.30	

District 6
Party	Votes	%	Seats
Tasmim Alliance	10,056	11.67	1
Sadrist Movement	8,528	9.90	1
Tasmim Alliance	7,322	8.50	1
State of Law Coalition	7,161	8.31	–
Fatah Alliance	6,597	7.66	–
Independent	5,725	6.64	–
Professionals Party for Reconstruction	4,595	5.33	–
National Contract Alliance	4,130	4.79	–
Independent	3,366	3.91	–
Tasmim Alliance	3,176	3.69	–
Azem Alliance	3,133	3.64	–
Rights Movement	2,996	3.48	–
Alliance of Nation State Forces	2,871	3.33	–
Eqtadar Watan Party	2,865	3.33	–
Independent	2,475	2.87	–
Iraqi Loyalty Movement	1,325	1.54	–
National Approach Alliance	1,245	1.44	–
National Awareness Movement	1,126	1.31	–
Independent	987	1.15	–
Al-Faw Zakho Coalition	910	1.06	–
Iraqi National Movement	718	0.83	–
Independent	665	0.77	–
Biladi National Movement	596	0.69	–
Independent	522	0.61	–
Independent	491	0.57	–
Construction and Reform Rally	458	0.53	–
Qadimun	388	0.45	–
Alliance of Nation State Forces	317	0.37	–
Civil Democratic Alliance	310	0.36	–
Rescuers	244	0.28	–
Al-Wataniya	240	0.28	–
Tasmim Alliance	197	0.23	–
Righteous Front	169	0.20	–
Qadimun	99	0.11	–
Construction and Reform Rally	84	0.10	–
Qadimun	74	0.09	–
Total	86,161	100.00	3
Valid votes	86,419	94.44	
Invalid/blank votes	5,087	5.56	
Total votes	91,506	100.00	
Registered voters/turnout	225,018	40.67	

Election results by district in Dayali Governorate

District 1
Party	Votes	%	Seats
Fatah Alliance	17,401	11.01	1
Progress Party	14,476	9.16	1
Azem Alliance	12,773	8.08	1
Azem Alliance	11,719	7.41	1
Progress Party	11,418	7.22	1
Independent	10,117	6.40	–
Azem Alliance	7,064	4.47	–
Azem Alliance	6,680	4.22	–
Iraqi National Project	6,027	3.81	–
Sadrist Movement	5,459	3.45	–
State of Law Coalition	5,164	3.27	–
Progress Party	4,469	2.83	–
Independent	3,832	2.42	–
National Contract Alliance	3,653	2.31	–
Azem Alliance	3,211	2.03	–
Azem Alliance	3,081	1.95	–
Independent	2,943	1.86	–
Independent	2,932	1.85	–
Independent	2,316	1.46	–
Qadimun	2,113	1.34	–
Alliance of Nation State Forces	1,529	0.97	–
Independent	1,391	0.88	–
Progress Party	1,076	0.68	–
Al-Med Al-Iraqi Movement	1,007	0.64	–
National Awareness Movement	998	0.63	–
Ḥarakat Nāzl Akhdh Ḥaqqī al-Dīmuqrāṭīyah	975	0.62	–
Civic Party	970	0.61	–
Independent	954	0.60	–
Qadimun	798	0.50	–
Independent	796	0.50	–
Al-Istqrar Bloc	773	0.49	–
Independent	714	0.45	–
Independent	707	0.45	–
United for Iraq	675	0.43	–
Independent	673	0.43	–
Youth Movement for Change	616	0.39	–
National Correction Party	568	0.36	–
Alliance of Nation State Forces	521	0.33	–
Achievement Movement	392	0.25	–
Alliance of Nation State Forces	392	0.25	–
Capable Coalition	387	0.24	–
National Correction Party	380	0.24	–
National Depth Alliance	344	0.22	–
Azem Alliance	327	0.21	–
Al-Wataniya	317	0.20	–
Banners of Benevolence	287	0.18	–
Youth Movement for Change	274	0.17	–
Al-Daae Party	243	0.15	–
National Depth Alliance	223	0.14	–
Youth Movement for Change	223	0.14	–
Al-Atifak Iraqi National Party	211	0.13	–
Iraqi Republican Group Party	205	0.13	–
Alliance of Civilian Forces	174	0.11	–
Al-Nour Movement - Uprising and Change	149	0.09	–
Tasmim Alliance	138	0.09	–
Azem Alliance	119	0.08	–
Iraqi Republican Group Party	116	0.07	–
Eqtadar Watan Party	113	0.07	–
National Tribal Movement in Iraq	103	0.07	–
Independent	84	0.05	–
Tasmim Alliance	80	0.05	–
National Party of the Masses	76	0.05	–
Independent	62	0.04	–
Independent	43	0.03	–
Al-Daae Party	33	0.02	–
Civil Democratic Alliance	26	0.02	–
Total	158,110	100.00	5
Valid votes	162,068	94.16	
Invalid/blank votes	10,059	5.84	
Total votes	172,127	100.00	
Registered voters/turnout	346,477	49.68	

District 2
Party	Votes	%	Seats
Fatah Alliance	25,519	22.82	1
Independent	16,795	15.02	1
State of Law Coalition	10,822	9.68	–
Sadrist Movement	9,120	8.16	–
Progress Party	9,028	8.07	–
Azem Alliance	7,265	6.50	1
Fatah Alliance	6,522	5.83	–
Azem Alliance	6,196	5.54	–
Tasmim Alliance	5,501	4.92	–
Alliance of Nation State Forces	4,118	3.68	–
National Product Party	3,225	2.88	–
Independent	2,165	1.94	–
Kurdistan Democratic Party	1,518	1.36	–
Independent	974	0.87	–
Independent	795	0.71	–
National Contract Alliance	539	0.48	–
Independent	503	0.45	–
Progress Party	488	0.44	–
National Certainty Party	167	0.15	–
Qadimun	159	0.14	–
State of Law Coalition	146	0.13	–
Civic Party	118	0.11	–
Civic Party	105	0.09	–
Alliance of Nation State Forces	40	0.04	–
Total	111,828	100.00	3
Valid votes	109,855	94.31	
Invalid/blank votes	6,626	5.69	
Total votes	116,481	100.00	
Registered voters/turnout	242,615	48.01	

District 3
Party	Votes	%	Seats
Independent	20,059	17.15	1
Fatah Alliance	13,543	11.58	1
Alliance of Nation State Forces	12,007	10.26	–
Azem Alliance	8,826	7.54	–
Progress Party	8,251	7.05	1
Independent	5,956	5.09	–
Sadrist Movement	5,908	5.05	–
Alliance of Nation State Forces	5,106	4.36	–
Tasmim Alliance	5,027	4.30	–
State of Law Coalition	4,850	4.15	–
National Contract Alliance	3,669	3.14	–
Progress Party	3,042	2.60	–
National Approach Alliance	2,457	2.10	–
State of Law Coalition	2,385	2.04	–
Independent	2,367	2.02	–
Azem Alliance	2,347	2.01	–
Tayyār al-Kalimah	1,686	1.44	–
National Party of the Masses	1,654	1.41	–
Qadimun	1,178	1.01	–
Iraqi Civil Society Gathering	1,135	0.97	–
Al-Daae Party	966	0.83	–
Independent	904	0.77	–
Independent	756	0.65	–
Independent	487	0.42	–
Eqtadar Watan Party	463	0.40	–
Independent	393	0.34	–
Achievement Movement	370	0.32	–
Independent	213	0.18	–
Independent	151	0.13	–
Qadimun	131	0.11	–
Civil Democratic Alliance	129	0.11	–
Independent	114	0.10	–
Iraq Shield Bloc	91	0.08	–
Capable Coalition	91	0.08	–
Civic Party	66	0.06	–
Independent	61	0.05	–
Iraqi Republican Group Party	57	0.05	–
Al-Daae Party	45	0.04	–
Rescuers	39	0.03	–
Total	116,980	100.00	3
Valid votes	112,411	95.09	
Invalid/blank votes	5,807	4.91	
Total votes	118,218	100.00	
Registered voters/turnout	218,456	54.12	

District 4
Party	Votes	%	Seats
Kurdistani Coalition	21,722	23.16	1
Azem Alliance	16,980	18.11	1
Progress Party	13,278	14.16	1
Fatah Alliance	9,700	10.34	–
Azem Alliance	7,703	8.21	–
Kurdistan Democratic Party	7,355	7.84	–
Alliance of Nation State Forces	3,591	3.83	–
Progress Party	2,742	2.92	–
Independent	1,569	1.67	–
Kurdistan Social Democratic Party	1,507	1.61	–
Independent	963	1.03	–
Rights Movement	937	1.00	–
Qadimun	757	0.81	–
National Party of the Masses	671	0.72	–
National Approach Alliance	645	0.69	–
Civic Party	541	0.58	–
Azem Alliance	454	0.48	–
Qadimun	403	0.43	–
Independent	394	0.42	–
Tayyār al-Kalimah	274	0.29	–
Independent	251	0.27	–
Independent	222	0.24	–
National Product Party	218	0.23	–
Independent	210	0.22	–
Azem Alliance	181	0.19	–
Iraqi Turkmen Maidan Party	99	0.11	–
Alliance of Nation State Forces	89	0.09	–
Independent	73	0.08	–
Al-Wataniya	59	0.06	–
Voices of the Masses Gathering	58	0.06	–
Iraqi Turkmen Front	52	0.06	–
Iraqi Republican Group Party	33	0.04	–
Achievement Movement	27	0.03	–
Independent	26	0.03	–
Total	93,784	100.00	3
Valid votes	92,401	93.60	
Invalid/blank votes	6,322	6.40	
Total votes	98,723	100.00	
Registered voters/turnout	207,319	47.62	

Election results by district in Dhi Qar Governorate

District 1
Party	Votes	%	Seats
Emtidad Movement	34,870	46.48	1
Sadrist Movement	6,805	9.07	1
State of Law Coalition	6,552	8.73	1
Sadrist Movement	4,676	6.23	–
Fatah Alliance	3,761	5.01	–
Professionals Party for Reconstruction	3,046	4.06	–
Emtidad Movement	3,034	4.04	–
Alliance of Nation State Forces	1,883	2.51	–
Independent	1,836	2.45	–
National Contract Alliance	1,333	1.78	–
Independent	1,188	1.58	–
National Contract Alliance	1,044	1.39	–
National Depth Alliance	947	1.26	–
Independent	872	1.16	–
Eqtadar Watan Party	807	1.08	–
Iraqi Loyalty Movement	602	0.80	–
Iraqi Loyalty Movement	370	0.49	–
Alliance of Nation State Forces	308	0.41	–
Qadimun	257	0.34	–
Independent	228	0.30	–
Rescuers	167	0.22	–
Independent	145	0.19	–
Rights Movement	122	0.16	–
Qadimun	112	0.15	–
Civil Democratic Alliance	60	0.08	–
Total	75,025	100.00	3
Valid votes	83,913	94.66	
Invalid/blank votes	4,735	5.34	
Total votes	88,648	100.00	
Registered voters/turnout	200,335	44.25	

District 2
Party	Votes	%	Seats
Emtidad Movement	41,399	34.41	1
Sadrist Movement	8,813	7.32	1
State of Law Coalition	8,297	6.90	1
Sadrist Movement	6,996	5.81	1
Fatah Alliance	5,034	4.18	–
Independent	4,833	4.02	–
Independent	4,724	3.93	–
Alliance of Nation State Forces	3,949	3.28	–
National Approach Alliance	3,936	3.27	–
Independent	3,854	3.20	–
Furatayn Movement	3,017	2.51	–
Conservatives	2,937	2.44	–
Independent	2,628	2.18	–
Rights Movement	2,500	2.08	–
National Contract Alliance	2,462	2.05	–
National Product Party	2,124	1.77	–
Independent	2,106	1.75	–
Independent	1,967	1.63	–
Independent	1,785	1.48	–
Independent	1,415	1.18	–
Alliance of Nation State Forces	1,085	0.90	–
Ḥarakat Nāzl Akhdh Ḥaqqī al-Dīmuqrāṭīyah	924	0.77	–
Independent	619	0.51	–
Professionals Party for Reconstruction	556	0.46	–
Independent	520	0.43	–
Qadimun	503	0.42	–
Rescuers	329	0.27	–
Al-Wataniya	312	0.26	–
Achievement Movement	233	0.19	–
Alliance of Nation State Forces	163	0.14	–
Islamic Loyalist Movement	116	0.10	–
Al-Nour Movement - Uprising and Change	91	0.08	–
Professionals Party for Reconstruction	58	0.05	–
National Contract Alliance	36	0.03	–
Total	120,321	100.00	4
Valid votes	116,687	96.13	
Invalid/blank votes	4,694	3.87	
Total votes	121,381	100.00	
Registered voters/turnout	274,273	44.26	

District 3
Party	Votes	%	Seats
Emtidad Movement	26,602	25.07	1
Independent	12,110	11.41	1
Sadrist Movement	9,648	9.09	1
Independent	8,187	7.72	–
State of Law Coalition	7,949	7.49	–
Sadrist Movement	7,810	7.36	1
Independent	4,606	4.34	–
Fatah Alliance	4,007	3.78	–
National Approach Alliance	3,620	3.41	–
Alliance of Nation State Forces	3,021	2.85	–
Professionals Party for Reconstruction	2,928	2.76	–
Rescuers	2,437	2.30	–
Rights Movement	1,914	1.80	–
Iraqi Loyalty Movement	1,845	1.74	–
Eqtadar Watan Party	1,835	1.73	–
National Depth Alliance	1,299	1.22	–
National Contract Alliance	1,298	1.22	–
Alliance of Nation State Forces	1,265	1.19	–
Furatayn Movement	959	0.90	–
Civil Democratic Alliance	680	0.64	–
Al-Faw Zakho Coalition	512	0.48	–
Al-Nour Movement - Uprising and Change	458	0.43	–
Professionals Party for Reconstruction	411	0.39	–
Independent	312	0.29	–
Confrontation	162	0.15	–
State of Law Coalition	121	0.11	–
Qadimun	70	0.07	–
Independent	38	0.04	–
Total	106,104	100.00	4
Valid votes	102,042	97.33	
Invalid/blank votes	2,800	2.67	
Total votes	104,842	100.00	
Registered voters/turnout	224,821	46.63	

District 4
Party	Votes	%	Seats
Emtidad Movement	28,140	29.73	1
State of Law Coalition	10,489	11.08	1
Sadrist Movement	9,469	10.00	1
Sadrist Movement	7,667	8.10	1
Fatah Alliance	6,750	7.13	–
National Approach Alliance	5,744	6.07	–
Fatah Alliance	5,158	5.45	–
Alliance of Nation State Forces	4,605	4.87	–
National Depth Alliance	3,965	4.19	–
Independent	2,292	2.42	–
Alliance of Nation State Forces	2,291	2.42	–
National Contract Alliance	2,088	2.21	–
Independent	1,812	1.91	–
Independent	1,736	1.83	–
Rescuers	676	0.71	–
Rescuers	488	0.52	–
Qadimun	312	0.33	–
Qadimun	235	0.25	–
Capable Coalition	208	0.22	–
Iraqi Loyalty Movement	156	0.16	–
Rights Movement	153	0.16	–
State of Law Coalition	130	0.14	–
Al-Nour Movement - Uprising and Change	50	0.05	–
National Approach Alliance	29	0.03	–
Total	94,643	100.00	4
Valid votes	89,566	96.20	
Invalid/blank votes	3,537	3.80	
Total votes	93,103	100.00	
Registered voters/turnout	200,110	46.53	

District 5
Party	Votes	%	Seats
Emtidad Movement	18,716	19.52	1
State of Law Coalition	9,034	9.42	1
Sadrist Movement	7,998	8.34	1
Sadrist Movement	5,763	6.01	1
Qadimun	5,637	5.88	–
Rights Movement	5,565	5.80	–
National Approach Alliance	4,883	5.09	–
Professionals Party for Reconstruction	4,547	4.74	–
Alliance of Nation State Forces	4,157	4.33	–
Wathiqoon	4,084	4.26	–
Fatah Alliance	3,939	4.11	–
Independent	3,580	3.73	–
Independent	3,375	3.52	–
Iraqi Economy Alliance/Economists	3,331	3.47	–
Biladi National Movement	2,339	2.44	–
Independent	2,234	2.33	–
Qadimun	1,827	1.91	–
Independent	1,670	1.74	–
Eqtadar Watan Party	1,115	1.16	–
National Depth Alliance	759	0.79	–
National Depth Alliance	590	0.62	–
Rescuers	305	0.32	–
Rescuers	218	0.23	–
Rescuers	123	0.13	–
National Approach Alliance	72	0.08	–
Civil Democratic Alliance	42	0.04	–
Total	95,903	100.00	4
Valid votes	90,743	95.98	
Invalid/blank votes	3,803	4.02	
Total votes	94,546	100.00	
Registered voters/turnout	238,205	39.69	

Election results by district in Duhok Governorate

District 1
Party	Votes	%	Seats
Independent	56,702	34.32	1
Kurdistan Democratic Party	29,083	17.60	1
Kurdistan Democratic Party	26,487	16.03	1
Kurdistan Democratic Party	22,565	13.66	–
Kurdistan Democratic Party	19,265	11.66	1
Independent	6,075	3.68	–
New Generation Movement	3,892	2.36	–
Kurdistan Social Democratic Party	600	0.36	–
Independent	536	0.32	–
Total	165,205	100.00	4
Valid votes	178,764	93.77	
Invalid/blank votes	11,880	6.23	
Total votes	190,644	100.00	
Registered voters/turnout	320,584	59.47	

District 2
Party	Votes	%	Seats
Kurdistan Democratic Party	28,003	25.66	1
Independent	24,442	22.40	1
Kurdistan Democratic Party	23,509	21.54	–
Kurdistan Democratic Party	21,457	19.66	1
Kurdistani Coalition	6,345	5.81	–
New Generation Movement	4,172	3.82	–
Kurdistan Social Democratic Party	772	0.71	–
Independent	436	0.40	–
Total	109,136	100.00	3
Valid votes	142,309	93.33	
Invalid/blank votes	10,169	6.67	
Total votes	152,478	100.00	
Registered voters/turnout	280,160	54.43	

District 3
Party	Votes	%	Seats
Kurdistan Democratic Party	29,990	24.66	1
Kurdistan Democratic Party	25,846	21.25	1
Kurdistani Coalition	18,695	15.37	1
Kurdistan Democratic Party	18,502	15.21	1
Kurdistan Democratic Party	16,836	13.84	–
New Generation Movement	11,228	9.23	–
Kurdistan Social Democratic Party	539	0.44	–
Total	121,636	100.00	4
Valid votes	128,531	87.54	
Invalid/blank votes	18,296	12.46	
Total votes	146,827	100.00	
Registered voters/turnout	231,680	63.37	

Election results by district in Erbil Governorate

District 1
Party	Votes	%	Seats
Kurdistan Democratic Party	44,928	25.76	1
Kurdistan Democratic Party	37,099	21.27	1
Kurdistan Democratic Party	33,656	19.30	1
Kurdistani Coalition	27,604	15.83	–
New Generation Movement	16,234	9.31	–
Kurdistan Democratic Party	12,843	7.36	1
Kurdistan Social Democratic Party	870	0.50	–
Qadimun	710	0.41	–
Kurdistani Coalition	483	0.28	–
Total	174,427	100.00	4
Valid votes	175,489	87.07	
Invalid/blank votes	26,059	12.93	
Total votes	201,548	100.00	
Registered voters/turnout	293,666	68.63	

District 2
Party	Votes	%	Seats
Kurdistan Democratic Party	25,373	26.05	1
New Generation Movement	24,626	25.29	1
Kurdistan Democratic Party	23,632	24.26	1
Kurdistani Coalition	18,370	18.86	1
Kurdistani Coalition	2,008	2.06	–
Kurdistan Democratic Party	1,652	1.70	–
Qadimun	1,030	1.06	–
Kurdistan Social Democratic Party	702	0.72	–
Total	97,393	100.00	4
Valid votes	113,334	79.62	
Invalid/blank votes	29,014	20.38	
Total votes	142,348	100.00	
Registered voters/turnout	280,424	50.76	

District 3
Party	Votes	%	Seats
Kurdistan Democratic Party	22,600	37.16	1
New Generation Movement	13,688	22.51	1
Kurdistani Coalition	8,920	14.67	1
Kurdistan Democratic Party	8,517	14.01	–
Kurdistan Justice Group	4,577	7.53	–
Independent	1,426	2.34	–
Qadimun	457	0.75	–
Kurdistan Toilers' Party	320	0.53	–
Iraqi Turkmen Front	308	0.51	–
Total	60,813	100.00	3
Valid votes	73,894	78.87	
Invalid/blank votes	19,799	21.13	
Total votes	93,693	100.00	
Registered voters/turnout	226,356	41.39	

District 4
Party	Votes	%	Seats
New Generation Movement	24,217	22.20	1
Kurdistan Democratic Party	20,384	18.69	1
Kurdistan Democratic Party	16,962	15.55	1
Kurdistan Justice Group	14,809	13.58	–
Kurdistan Democratic Party	13,872	12.72	1
Kurdistani Coalition	10,336	9.47	–
Independent	2,517	2.31	–
Kurdistani Coalition	2,237	2.05	–
Independent	1,028	0.94	–
Iraqi Turkmen Front	559	0.51	–
Independent	470	0.43	–
Independent	440	0.40	–
Iraqi Turkmen Front	408	0.37	–
Independent	346	0.32	–
Kurdistan Social Democratic Party	202	0.19	–
Qadimun	162	0.15	–
Qadimun	141	0.13	–
Total	109,090	100.00	4
Valid votes	117,175	79.38	
Invalid/blank votes	30,444	20.62	
Total votes	147,619	100.00	
Registered voters/turnout	350,974	42.06	

Election results by district in Karbala Governorate

District 1
Party	Votes	%	Seats
Sadrist Movement	13,604	14.11	1
State of Law Coalition	12,277	12.74	1
Ishraqat Kanoon	8,357	8.67	1
Sadrist Movement	8,325	8.64	1
Fatah Alliance	7,984	8.28	–
Sadrist Movement	7,668	7.96	–
National Approach Alliance	5,505	5.71	–
Al-Faw Zakho Coalition	5,178	5.37	–
Furatayn Movement	5,001	5.19	–
Alliance of Nation State Forces	4,059	4.21	–
New Generation Movement	2,854	2.96	–
Independent	2,718	2.82	–
Eqtadar Watan Party	2,527	2.62	–
Qadimun	1,612	1.67	–
Tasmim Alliance	1,279	1.33	–
Kurdistan Democratic Party	1,084	1.12	–
Rescuers	1,001	1.04	–
Alliance of Nation State Forces	968	1.00	–
Capable Coalition	819	0.85	–
Civic Party	731	0.76	–
Confrontation	570	0.59	–
Iraqi Loyalty Movement	533	0.55	–
Iraqi Republican Group Party	463	0.48	–
Qadimun	434	0.45	–
National Tribal Movement in Iraq	303	0.31	–
Al-Wataniya	259	0.27	–
Achievement Movement	190	0.20	–
Alliance of Nation State Forces	89	0.09	–
Total	96,392	100.00	4
Valid votes	94,966	93.70	
Invalid/blank votes	6,381	6.30	
Total votes	101,347	100.00	
Registered voters/turnout	225,783	44.89	

District 2
Party	Votes	%	Seats
State of Law Coalition	15,792	14.25	1
Sadrist Movement	10,129	9.14	1
Ishraqat Kanoon	6,797	6.13	–
Fatah Alliance	5,777	5.21	–
Alliance of Nation State Forces	5,115	4.62	–
Rights Movement	4,773	4.31	–
National Hopes Bloc	4,657	4.20	–
Independent	4,213	3.80	–
National Approach Alliance	4,097	3.70	–
Alliance of Nation State Forces	4,026	3.63	1
Tasmim Alliance	3,975	3.59	–
National Depth Alliance	3,934	3.55	–
Emtidad Movement	3,784	3.41	–
Qadimun	3,270	2.95	–
Iraqi Loyalty Movement	2,996	2.70	–
Fatah Alliance	2,745	2.48	–
Independent	2,599	2.35	–
Independent	2,568	2.32	–
Qadimun	2,411	2.18	–
Wathiqoon	2,401	2.17	–
Independent	2,053	1.85	–
National Contract Alliance	1,569	1.42	–
Furatayn Movement	1,498	1.35	–
National Awareness Movement	1,482	1.34	–
Ḥarakat Nāzl Akhdh Ḥaqqī al-Dīmuqrāṭīyah	1,456	1.31	–
Independent	1,342	1.21	–
Qadimun	1,222	1.10	–
National Depth Alliance	844	0.76	–
Eqtadar Watan Party	780	0.70	–
Al-Nour Movement - Uprising and Change	448	0.40	–
Al-Faw Zakho Coalition	432	0.39	–
Independent	424	0.38	–
Civic Party	335	0.30	–
Alliance of Civilian Forces	234	0.21	–
Achievement Movement	223	0.20	–
Iraq Shield Bloc	199	0.18	–
Civic Party	83	0.07	–
National Approach Alliance	72	0.06	–
Civil Democratic Alliance	53	0.05	–
Total	110,808	100.00	3
Valid votes	102,990	94.24	
Invalid/blank votes	6,294	5.76	
Total votes	109,284	100.00	
Registered voters/turnout	227,701	47.99	

District 3
Party	Votes	%	Seats
Ishraqat Kanoon	12,205	14.07	1
Sadrist Movement	11,279	13.00	1
National Hopes Bloc	7,487	8.63	1
Emtidad Movement	7,331	8.45	–
State of Law Coalition	6,198	7.14	–
Fatah Alliance	5,026	5.79	–
Independent	3,932	4.53	–
Tasmim Alliance	3,873	4.46	–
Independent	3,416	3.94	–
Eqtadar Watan Party	3,061	3.53	–
National Approach Alliance	2,352	2.71	–
Al-Faw Zakho Coalition	2,088	2.41	–
National Product Party	1,730	1.99	1
Alliance of Nation State Forces	1,243	1.43	–
Educators' Gathering	1,230	1.42	–
Alliance of Nation State Forces	1,139	1.31	–
Independent	1,074	1.24	–
Independent	1,062	1.22	–
Rights Movement	1,022	1.18	–
Qadimun	947	1.09	–
National Depth Alliance	906	1.04	–
Independent	901	1.04	–
Achievement Movement	758	0.87	–
Qadimun	644	0.74	–
Qadimun	536	0.62	–
Biladi National Movement	534	0.62	–
Independent	459	0.53	–
Ḥarakat Nāzl Akhdh Ḥaqqī al-Dīmuqrāṭīyah	447	0.52	–
National Hopes Bloc	445	0.51	–
Tasmim Alliance	440	0.51	–
Achievement Movement	395	0.46	–
Al-Nour Movement - Uprising and Change	343	0.40	–
Rescuers	268	0.31	–
Iraqi National Loyalty Party	244	0.28	–
Independent	233	0.27	–
Al-Nour Movement - Uprising and Change	229	0.26	–
Achievement Movement	197	0.23	–
Iraqi Republican Group Party	189	0.22	–
National Tribal Movement in Iraq	168	0.19	–
National Tribal Movement in Iraq	146	0.17	–
Tanẓīm al-Dākhil	132	0.15	–
New Generation Movement	106	0.12	–
Civic Party	102	0.12	–
Al-Daae Party	98	0.11	–
Civil Democratic Alliance	62	0.07	–
National Approach Alliance	62	0.07	–
Qadimun	18	0.02	–
Total	86,757	100.00	4
Valid votes	92,233	92.63	
Invalid/blank votes	7,339	7.37	
Total votes	99,572	100.00	
Registered voters/turnout	235,839	42.22	

Election results by district in Kirkuk Governorate

District 1
Party	Votes	%	Seats
Kurdistan Democratic Party	37,744	22.34	1
New Generation Movement	23,090	13.67	1
Independent	21,510	12.73	1
Kurdistani Coalition	15,708	9.30	1
Independent	14,358	8.50	1
Kurdistani Coalition	11,348	6.72	–
Kurdistani Coalition	9,821	5.81	–
Kurdistani Coalition	9,058	5.36	–
Independent	5,205	3.08	–
Unified Iraqi Turkmen Front	5,197	3.08	–
Independent	3,216	1.90	–
Kurdistani Coalition	2,481	1.47	–
Independent	1,957	1.16	–
Unified Iraqi Turkmen Front	1,012	0.60	–
Independent	800	0.47	–
Independent	776	0.46	–
Arab Alliance of Kirkuk	771	0.46	–
Independent	680	0.40	–
Independent	515	0.30	–
Independent	477	0.28	–
Unified Iraqi Turkmen Front	459	0.27	–
Independent	395	0.23	–
Independent	372	0.22	–
Independent	342	0.20	–
Kurdistan Toilers' Party	249	0.15	–
Kurdistan Social Democratic Party	221	0.13	–
Qadimun	203	0.12	–
Qadimun	188	0.11	–
Independent	166	0.10	–
Iraqi Turkmen Maidan Party	138	0.08	–
Independent	129	0.08	–
Independent	127	0.08	–
Rescuers	125	0.07	–
Independent	107	0.06	–
Total	168,945	100.00	5
Valid votes	171,129	92.72	
Invalid/blank votes	13,429	7.28	
Total votes	184,558	100.00	
Registered voters/turnout	434,958	42.43	

District 2
Party	Votes	%	Seats
Unified Iraqi Turkmen Front	23,060	15.88	1
Kurdistani Coalition	13,239	9.12	1
Kurdistan Democratic Party	11,887	8.19	1
Fatah Alliance	7,731	5.32	1
Unified Iraqi Turkmen Front	7,730	5.32	–
Progress Party	7,652	5.27	–
Arab Alliance of Kirkuk	6,277	4.32	–
Unified Iraqi Turkmen Front	6,243	4.30	–
Independent	4,515	3.11	–
Arab Alliance of Kirkuk	4,284	2.95	–
Independent	3,996	2.75	–
Iraqi National Project	3,377	2.33	–
Independent	3,217	2.22	–
Independent	3,174	2.19	–
Independent	2,975	2.05	–
Achievement Movement	2,849	1.96	–
Independent	2,807	1.93	–
Independent	2,666	1.84	–
Al-Istqrar Bloc	2,628	1.81	–
Independent	2,524	1.74	–
State of Law Coalition	2,509	1.73	–
Independent	2,433	1.68	–
New Generation Movement	2,306	1.59	–
Unified Iraqi Turkmen Front	1,943	1.34	–
Kurdistani Coalition	1,716	1.18	–
Independent	1,365	0.94	–
Alliance of Nation State Forces	1,135	0.78	–
Independent	1,036	0.71	–
National Party of the Masses	933	0.64	–
Independent	887	0.61	–
Alliance of Nation State Forces	701	0.48	–
Independent	660	0.45	–
Progress Party	548	0.38	–
Iraqi Turkmen Maidan Party	414	0.29	–
Qadimun	350	0.24	–
Qadimun	321	0.22	–
Independent	314	0.22	–
Arab Alliance of Kirkuk	311	0.21	–
Independent	259	0.18	–
Kurdistan Islamic Movement	222	0.15	–
Independent	221	0.15	–
National Unity Front	219	0.15	–
Independent	215	0.15	–
Kurdistan Social Democratic Party	204	0.14	–
Ḥarakat Nāzl Akhdh Ḥaqqī al-Dīmuqrāṭīyah	177	0.12	–
Iraqi Glory Party	163	0.11	–
Independent	149	0.10	–
Rescuers	115	0.08	–
Al-Wataniya	104	0.07	–
Qadimun	90	0.06	–
Independent	86	0.06	–
Iraqi Turkmen Maidan Party	72	0.05	–
Tayyār al-Kalimah	55	0.04	–
Iraqi Harmony	46	0.03	–
Independent	43	0.03	–
Independent	38	0.03	–
Total	145,191	100.00	4
Valid votes	146,310	95.72	
Invalid/blank votes	6,546	4.28	
Total votes	152,856	100.00	
Registered voters/turnout	370,431	41.26	

District 3
Party	Votes	%	Seats
Progress Party	24,391	25.14	1
Arab Alliance of Kirkuk	14,684	15.14	1
United Arab Front	11,129	11.47	–
National Contract Alliance	9,967	10.27	1
Progress Party	8,015	8.26	–
Independent	3,853	3.97	–
Independent	3,264	3.36	–
Independent	2,639	2.72	–
Independent	1,876	1.93	–
Qadimun	1,844	1.90	–
Progress Party	1,684	1.74	–
Independent	1,653	1.70	–
National Correction Party	1,524	1.57	–
Independent	1,312	1.35	–
Free Iraqi Bloc	1,261	1.30	–
Independent	998	1.03	–
National Party of the Masses	882	0.91	–
Independent	840	0.87	–
Independent	834	0.86	–
Independent	678	0.70	–
Iraqi Loyalty Movement	635	0.65	–
Independent	495	0.51	–
National Product Party	493	0.51	–
Independent	488	0.50	–
Independent	442	0.46	–
Independent	317	0.33	–
National Contract Alliance	288	0.30	–
Unified Iraqi Turkmen Front	109	0.11	–
Arab Alliance of Kirkuk	87	0.09	–
Independent	77	0.08	–
Qadimun	72	0.07	–
Independent	32	0.03	–
Independent	29	0.03	–
United Arab Front	29	0.03	–
Independent	21	0.02	–
National Correction Party	21	0.02	–
National Party of the Masses	21	0.02	–
Civil Path Party	14	0.01	–
New Generation Movement	13	0.01	–
Total	97,011	100.00	3
Valid votes	98,300	97.82	
Invalid/blank votes	2,194	2.18	
Total votes	100,494	100.00	
Registered voters/turnout	186,729	53.82	

Election results by district in Maisan Governorate

District 1
Party	Votes	%	Seats
Sadrist Movement	15,782	20.69	1
Sadrist Movement	12,659	16.60	1
Independent	10,133	13.28	–
Fatah Alliance	9,438	12.37	–
Sadrist Movement	6,640	8.71	1
State of Law Coalition	5,999	7.86	–
Alliance of Nation State Forces	3,952	5.18	–
National Contract Alliance	2,454	3.22	–
National Approach Alliance	1,870	2.45	–
Civic Party	1,622	2.13	–
Qadimun	1,293	1.70	–
National Awareness Movement	1,110	1.46	–
Independent	961	1.26	–
Independent	635	0.83	–
Qadimun	283	0.37	–
Homeland Safety Coalition	230	0.30	–
Qadimun	227	0.30	–
Eqtadar Watan Party	202	0.26	–
Construction and Reform Rally	191	0.25	–
Rescuers	180	0.24	–
Civil Democratic Alliance	166	0.22	–
Fatah Alliance	144	0.19	–
Trust Party	104	0.14	–
Total	76,275	100.00	3
Valid votes	79,516	94.72	
Invalid/blank votes	4,432	5.28	
Total votes	83,948	100.00	
Registered voters/turnout	185,611	45.23	

District 2
Party	Votes	%	Seats
Sadrist Movement	18,721	19.73	1
State of Law Coalition	15,988	16.85	1
Sadrist Movement	15,451	16.28	–
Independent	10,105	10.65	–
Fatah Alliance	8,738	9.21	–
Sadrist Movement	6,960	7.33	1
Independent	6,099	6.43	–
Alliance of Nation State Forces	5,311	5.60	–
National Depth Alliance	1,594	1.68	–
Furatayn Movement	1,591	1.68	–
Ḥarakat Nāzl Akhdh Ḥaqqī al-Dīmuqrāṭīyah	1,283	1.35	–
Tayyār al-Kalimah	1,162	1.22	–
Independent	615	0.65	–
Rescuers	429	0.45	–
Civil Democratic Alliance	347	0.37	–
National Depth Alliance	220	0.23	–
Independent	198	0.21	–
Iraqi Loyalty Movement	88	0.09	–
Total	94,900	100.00	3
Valid votes	97,318	95.16	
Invalid/blank votes	4,954	4.84	
Total votes	102,272	100.00	
Registered voters/turnout	223,712	45.72	

District 3
Party	Votes	%	Seats
Sadrist Movement	13,527	13.47	1
Independent	12,239	12.19	1
State of Law Coalition	10,706	10.66	1
Sadrist Movement	9,976	9.93	–
Fatah Alliance	9,347	9.31	–
Alliance of Nation State Forces	7,314	7.28	–
Independent	6,105	6.08	–
Sadrist Movement	5,559	5.54	1
National Approach Alliance	4,526	4.51	–
Independent	3,632	3.62	–
Rights Movement	3,043	3.03	–
Independent	2,828	2.82	–
Furatayn Movement	2,816	2.80	–
National Contract Alliance	2,685	2.67	–
Qadimun	2,103	2.09	–
Alliance of Nation State Forces	2,103	2.09	–
Al-Wataniya	1,034	1.03	–
Independent	762	0.76	–
Civic Party	77	0.08	–
Rescuers	39	0.04	–
Total	100,421	100.00	4
Valid votes	97,084	96.63	
Invalid/blank votes	3,391	3.37	
Total votes	100,475	100.00	
Registered voters/turnout	232,038	43.30	

Election results by district in Muthanna Governorate

District 1
Party	Votes	%	Seats
Sadrist Movement	11,856	11.13	1
Independent	11,755	11.04	1
State of Law Coalition	10,081	9.47	1
State of Law Coalition	8,836	8.30	1
Independent	7,874	7.39	–
National Awareness Movement	6,778	6.36	–
Fatah Alliance	4,826	4.53	–
National Contract Alliance	4,018	3.77	–
Alliance of Nation State Forces	3,648	3.43	–
National Approach Alliance	3,560	3.34	–
Rights Movement	3,061	2.87	–
Alliance of Nation State Forces	2,670	2.51	–
Al-Nour Movement - Uprising and Change	2,506	2.35	–
Wathiqoon	2,409	2.26	–
Emtidad Movement	2,366	2.22	–
Independent	2,205	2.07	–
Gathering of Talents and Masses	1,976	1.86	–
Eqtadar Watan Party	1,671	1.57	–
Furatayn Movement	1,615	1.52	–
Independent	1,557	1.46	–
Independent	1,223	1.15	–
Al-Faw Zakho Coalition	1,066	1.00	–
Independent	948	0.89	–
Independent	866	0.81	–
Qadimun	801	0.75	–
Independent	756	0.71	–
Qadimun	750	0.70	–
Iraqi Loyalty Movement	659	0.62	–
Qadimun	658	0.62	–
Independent	632	0.59	–
Tayyār al-Kalimah	471	0.44	–
Tasmim Alliance	395	0.37	–
Ishraqat Kanoon	327	0.31	–
National Awareness Movement	275	0.26	–
Al-Wataniya	275	0.26	–
Voices of the Masses Gathering	267	0.25	–
Alliance of Civilian Forces	250	0.23	–
Rescuers	237	0.22	–
Iraqi National Loyalty Party	115	0.11	–
National Approach Alliance	97	0.09	–
Iraqi Loyalty Movement	90	0.08	–
Civil Democratic Alliance	47	0.04	–
Civic Party	24	0.02	–
Total	106,497	100.00	4
Valid votes	107,295	95.39	
Invalid/blank votes	5,181	4.61	
Total votes	112,476	100.00	
Registered voters/turnout	275,898	40.77	

District 2
Party	Votes	%	Seats
State of Law Coalition	12,774	13.55	1
Alliance of Nation State Forces	9,529	10.11	1
Alliance of Nation State Forces	8,672	9.20	–
Sadrist Movement	5,809	6.16	1
National Awareness Movement	5,686	6.03	–
Ishraqat Kanoon	4,344	4.61	–
Independent	4,090	4.34	–
Independent	3,980	4.22	–
National Contract Alliance	3,870	4.11	–
Alliance of Nation State Forces	3,870	4.11	–
Wathiqoon	3,805	4.04	–
Rights Movement	3,358	3.56	–
Tasmim Alliance	3,205	3.40	–
Independent	3,108	3.30	–
National Approach Alliance	2,901	3.08	–
Civic Party	2,704	2.87	–
Independent	2,488	2.64	–
National Product Party	2,189	2.32	–
Fatah Alliance	1,855	1.97	–
National Contract Alliance	1,234	1.31	–
Independent	1,086	1.15	–
Independent	995	1.06	–
Iraqi Loyalty Movement	870	0.92	–
Independent	731	0.78	–
Independent	476	0.51	–
National Depth Alliance	327	0.35	–
Al-Wataniya	152	0.16	–
Eqtadar Watan Party	53	0.06	–
Rescuers	39	0.04	–
Civil Democratic Alliance	28	0.03	–
Al-Nour Movement - Uprising and Change	24	0.03	–
Total	94,252	100.00	3
Valid votes	88,801	96.04	
Invalid/blank votes	3,661	3.96	
Total votes	92,462	100.00	
Registered voters/turnout	192,590	48.01	

Election results by district in Najaf Governorate

District 1
Party	Votes	%	Seats
Independent	18,918	13.35	1
Sadrist Movement	16,271	11.48	1
Independent	13,881	9.79	1
State of Law Coalition	8,330	5.88	1
Sadrist Movement	7,625	5.38	1
Iraqi Loyalty Movement	6,527	4.61	–
Alliance of Nation State Forces	6,069	4.28	–
Ishraqat Kanoon	5,896	4.16	–
Wathiqoon	5,799	4.09	–
Alliance of Nation State Forces	5,378	3.79	–
Fatah Alliance	4,956	3.50	–
Emtidad Movement	4,316	3.05	–
Independent	3,956	2.79	–
Independent	2,915	2.06	–
Capable Coalition	2,169	1.53	–
White Dome Assembly	2,117	1.49	–
Al-Nour Movement - Uprising and Change	1,954	1.38	–
Rights Movement	1,868	1.32	–
National Product Party	1,716	1.21	–
Eqtadar Watan Party	1,589	1.12	–
Homeland Safety Coalition	1,433	1.01	–
Independent	1,375	0.97	–
Al-Faw Zakho Coalition	1,274	0.90	–
Independent	1,252	0.88	–
National Approach Alliance	1,249	0.88	–
National Depth Alliance	1,223	0.86	–
Emtidad Movement	1,222	0.86	–
Independent	1,177	0.83	–
Iraqi National Movement	862	0.61	–
Tasmim Alliance	854	0.60	–
Renaissance and Construction Gathering	851	0.60	–
Independent	747	0.53	–
Iraqi Loyalty Movement	703	0.50	–
Iraqi Loyalty Movement	688	0.49	–
Qadimun	623	0.44	–
Iraqi National Loyalty Party	542	0.38	–
Kafa Movement	471	0.33	–
Supporters of the Truth Nation	382	0.27	–
Supporters of the Truth Nation	373	0.26	–
Rescuers	354	0.25	–
Alliance of Nation State Forces	312	0.22	–
Homeland Safety Coalition	298	0.21	–
Qadimun	255	0.18	–
Fatah Alliance	197	0.14	–
Tayyār al-Kalimah	191	0.13	–
National Hopes Bloc	172	0.12	–
Qadimun	127	0.09	–
Civil Democratic Alliance	110	0.08	–
Alliance of Nation State Forces	69	0.05	–
People's Reform Party	53	0.04	–
Rescuers	33	0.02	–
Total	141,722	100.00	5
Valid votes	145,585	94.35	
Invalid/blank votes	8,714	5.65	
Total votes	154,299	100.00	
Registered voters/turnout	391,005	39.46	

District 2
Party	Votes	%	Seats
Sadrist Movement	14,187	13.18	1
Independent	12,698	11.79	1
Independent	10,741	9.98	1
Emtidad Movement	9,065	8.42	–
Sadrist Movement	8,083	7.51	1
State of Law Coalition	7,870	7.31	–
Alliance of Nation State Forces	6,258	5.81	–
Independent	6,114	5.68	–
Fatah Alliance	5,874	5.46	–
National Contract Alliance	4,176	3.88	–
Iraqi Loyalty Movement	3,384	3.14	–
Independent	3,248	3.02	–
Rights Movement	2,746	2.55	–
Wathiqoon	2,403	2.23	–
Renaissance and Construction Gathering	2,232	2.07	–
Alliance of Nation State Forces	1,419	1.32	–
Independent	977	0.91	–
Al-Faw Zakho Coalition	932	0.87	–
Qadimun	927	0.86	–
Achievement Movement	619	0.57	–
Capable Coalition	572	0.53	–
Iraqi National Movement	518	0.48	–
Eqtadar Watan Party	511	0.47	–
Qadimun	376	0.35	–
Independent	337	0.31	–
Tayyār al-Kalimah	323	0.30	–
Civic Party	258	0.24	–
Iraqi National Loyalty Party	256	0.24	–
National Approach Alliance	232	0.22	–
Qadimun	215	0.20	–
Qadimun	127	0.12	–
Total	107,678	100.00	4
Valid votes	104,805	95.63	
Invalid/blank votes	4,790	4.37	
Total votes	109,595	100.00	
Registered voters/turnout	244,147	44.89	

District 3
Party	Votes	%	Seats
Emtidad Movement	15,891	17.93	1
State of Law Coalition	12,970	14.64	1
Sadrist Movement	11,326	12.78	–
Fatah Alliance	10,585	11.95	–
Alliance of Nation State Forces	9,184	10.36	–
Sadrist Movement	6,462	7.29	1
Ḥarakat Nāzl Akhdh Ḥaqqī al-Dīmuqrāṭīyah	4,186	4.72	–
Iraqi Loyalty Movement	4,027	4.54	–
Independent	2,634	2.97	–
Al-Faw Zakho Coalition	1,818	2.05	–
Rights Movement	1,632	1.84	–
National Contract Alliance	1,579	1.78	–
Tayyār al-Kalimah	1,562	1.76	–
Eqtadar Watan Party	1,301	1.47	–
National Approach Alliance	905	1.02	–
Renaissance and Construction Gathering	834	0.94	–
Al-Wataniya	463	0.52	–
Qadimun	453	0.51	–
Qadimun	360	0.41	–
Qadimun	310	0.35	–
Al-Daae Party	130	0.15	–
Total	88,612	100.00	3
Valid votes	85,735	95.38	
Invalid/blank votes	4,153	4.62	
Total votes	89,888	100.00	
Registered voters/turnout	200,390	44.86	

Election results by district in Nineveh Governorate

District 1
Party	Votes	%	Seats
Kurdistan Democratic Party	16,408	27.79	1
Kurdistan Democratic Party	13,321	22.56	1
Kurdistani Coalition	7,135	12.09	1
Fatah Alliance	4,291	7.27	–
National Contract Alliance	3,616	6.13	–
National Party of the Masses	3,362	5.69	–
United for Iraq	2,236	3.79	–
Progress Party	2,032	3.44	–
Progress Party	1,581	2.68	–
Independent	1,065	1.80	–
Independent	990	1.68	–
Azem Alliance	900	1.52	–
National Depth Alliance	826	1.40	–
Independent	710	1.20	–
National Correction Party	351	0.59	–
Independent	108	0.18	–
Qadimun	104	0.18	–
Total	59,036	100.00	3
Valid votes	87,214	93.99	
Invalid/blank votes	5,572	6.01	
Total votes	92,786	100.00	
Registered voters/turnout	173,267	53.55	

District 2
Party	Votes	%	Seats
Kurdistan Democratic Party	15,620	18.54	1
Kurdistan Democratic Party	14,690	17.44	1
Kurdistan Democratic Party	11,888	14.11	1
Kurdistani Coalition	8,183	9.71	1
Kurdistan Democratic Party	7,222	8.57	–
National Correction Party	6,682	7.93	–
Progress Party	4,922	5.84	–
Fatah Alliance	2,754	3.27	–
Azem Alliance	2,570	3.05	–
United for Iraq	2,083	2.47	–
Communist Party of Kurdistan – Iraq	1,392	1.65	–
Fatah Alliance	1,276	1.51	–
Alliance of Nation State Forces	882	1.05	–
Progress Party	720	0.85	–
State of Law Coalition	576	0.68	–
Progress Party	490	0.58	–
Independent	490	0.58	–
Independent	457	0.54	–
United for Iraq	432	0.51	–
Independent	359	0.43	–
Youth Movement for Change	258	0.31	–
National Party of the Masses	242	0.29	–
Qadimun	59	0.07	–
Total	84,247	100.00	4
Valid votes	96,966	94.54	
Invalid/blank votes	5,596	5.46	
Total votes	102,562	100.00	
Registered voters/turnout	195,074	52.58	

District 3
Party	Votes	%	Seats
Kurdistan Democratic Party	17,790	26.59	1
Kurdistan Democratic Party	11,934	17.84	1
Kurdistan Democratic Party	8,556	12.79	1
Kurdistani Coalition	7,451	11.14	–
National Contract Alliance	5,261	7.86	–
United for Iraq	4,413	6.60	–
Yazidi Freedom and Democracy Party	3,651	5.46	–
Independent	2,503	3.74	–
Independent	1,502	2.24	–
Progress Party	1,411	2.11	–
Independent	990	1.48	–
Achievement Movement	720	1.08	–
Al-Istqrar Bloc	606	0.91	–
Progress Party	97	0.14	–
Independent	27	0.04	–
Total	66,912	100.00	3
Valid votes	40,171	96.25	
Invalid/blank votes	1,566	3.75	
Total votes	41,737	100.00	
Registered voters/turnout	135,742	30.75	

District 4
Party	Votes	%	Seats
Independent	17,197	12.20	1
Kurdistan Democratic Party	16,419	11.65	1
Independent	15,358	10.90	1
Fatah Alliance	12,886	9.14	–
Alliance of Nation State Forces	9,580	6.80	–
National Contract Alliance	6,568	4.66	–
Independent	5,487	3.89	–
Hasim Movement for Reform	4,919	3.49	1
Kurdistani Coalition	4,878	3.46	–
Fatah Alliance	4,612	3.27	–
Independent	4,171	2.96	–
Progress Party	4,024	2.86	–
Independent	3,346	2.37	–
Azem Alliance	3,338	2.37	–
Independent	3,326	2.36	–
National Depth Alliance	3,133	2.22	–
Independent	2,480	1.76	–
National Contract Alliance	2,404	1.71	–
Progress Party	2,232	1.58	–
Independent	2,212	1.57	–
Independent	2,186	1.55	–
Independent	1,537	1.09	–
Independent	1,439	1.02	–
United for Iraq	957	0.68	–
Independent	907	0.64	–
Progress Party	897	0.64	–
Independent	639	0.45	–
Independent	489	0.35	–
Progress Party	467	0.33	–
Azem Alliance	466	0.33	–
Independent	444	0.32	–
Azem Alliance	427	0.30	–
Tayyār al-Kalimah	384	0.27	–
Independent	382	0.27	–
Independent	224	0.16	–
Kurdistan Democratic Party	207	0.15	–
Qadimun	122	0.09	–
Fatah Alliance	110	0.08	–
Qadimun	63	0.04	–
Total	140,917	100.00	4
Valid votes	135,770	96.97	
Invalid/blank votes	4,239	3.03	
Total votes	140,009	100.00	
Registered voters/turnout	237,927	58.85	

District 5
Party	Votes	%	Seats
Progress Party	12,071	8.87	1
National Contract Alliance	11,432	8.40	1
National Contract Alliance	9,749	7.16	1
Hasim Movement for Reform	6,242	4.59	1
Azem Alliance	5,053	3.71	–
National Party of the Masses	5,040	3.70	1
National Contract Alliance	5,028	3.69	–
National Party of the Masses	4,756	3.49	–
Azem Alliance	4,604	3.38	–
Independent	4,554	3.35	–
Azem Alliance	3,810	2.80	–
Independent	3,713	2.73	–
Progress Party	3,601	2.65	–
Azem Alliance	3,380	2.48	–
Independent	3,329	2.45	–
Independent	3,203	2.35	–
Independent	3,131	2.30	–
Azem Alliance	3,013	2.21	–
Independent	2,952	2.17	–
Independent	2,871	2.11	–
Progress Party	2,484	1.83	–
Azem Alliance	2,107	1.55	–
Independent	1,933	1.42	–
Independent	1,877	1.38	–
Independent	1,624	1.19	–
Progress Party	1,466	1.08	–
Independent	1,399	1.03	–
Independent	1,354	0.99	–
Independent	1,179	0.87	–
Azem Alliance	1,178	0.87	–
National Correction Party	1,171	0.86	–
Independent	1,117	0.82	–
Independent	1,039	0.76	–
Independent	834	0.61	–
Independent	823	0.60	–
United for Iraq	800	0.59	–
National Party of the Masses	785	0.58	–
Progress Party	779	0.57	–
National Contract Alliance	777	0.57	–
Iraq Renaissance and Peace Bloc	772	0.57	–
National Party of the Masses	650	0.48	–
Iraq Renaissance and Peace Bloc	633	0.47	–
Hasim Movement for Reform	622	0.46	–
Independent	595	0.44	–
Qadimun	557	0.41	–
Independent	545	0.40	–
Iraqi Republican Group Party	537	0.39	–
United for Iraq	491	0.36	–
Progress Party	429	0.32	–
Qadimun	418	0.31	–
Independent	358	0.26	–
Fatah Alliance	340	0.25	–
Kurdistan Democratic Party	327	0.24	–
United for Iraq	296	0.22	–
Independent	285	0.21	–
Independent	248	0.18	–
Independent	228	0.17	–
Progress Party	204	0.15	–
Tasmim Alliance	164	0.12	–
Independent	159	0.12	–
National Certainty Party	142	0.10	–
Independent	139	0.10	–
National Awareness Movement	136	0.10	–
Progress Party	111	0.08	–
United for Iraq	96	0.07	–
Kurdistani Coalition	92	0.07	–
Independent	85	0.06	–
Independent	60	0.04	–
Alliance of Nation State Forces	37	0.03	–
Independent	30	0.02	–
Azem Alliance	28	0.02	–
Qadimun	12	0.01	–
Total	136,084	100.00	5
Valid votes	138,535	96.42	
Invalid/blank votes	5,151	3.58	
Total votes	143,686	100.00	
Registered voters/turnout	268,872	53.44	

District 6
Party	Votes	%	Seats
Hasim Movement for Reform	9,983	7.91	1
Progress Party	5,548	4.39	1
Azem Alliance	5,179	4.10	1
Iraqi National Project	5,149	4.08	1
National Party of the Masses	4,880	3.86	–
National Party of the Masses	4,780	3.79	–
Azem Alliance	4,724	3.74	–
Independent	4,598	3.64	–
Progress Party	4,543	3.60	1
Iraq Renaissance and Peace Bloc	4,114	3.26	–
Progress Party	4,040	3.20	–
Azem Alliance	3,438	2.72	–
United for Iraq	3,409	2.70	–
Progress Party	2,977	2.36	–
Independent	2,900	2.30	–
Independent	2,510	1.99	–
Independent	2,311	1.83	–
Progress Party	2,100	1.66	–
National Party of the Masses	2,060	1.63	–
National Contract Alliance	1,990	1.58	–
Independent	1,989	1.58	–
Azem Alliance	1,861	1.47	–
Independent	1,611	1.28	–
United for Iraq	1,602	1.27	–
Independent	1,589	1.26	–
Al-Istqrar Bloc	1,446	1.15	–
Progress Party	1,430	1.13	–
Independent	1,361	1.08	–
Tasmim Alliance	1,238	0.98	–
Al-Istqrar Bloc	1,170	0.93	–
Independent	1,155	0.91	–
Independent	1,152	0.91	–
Iraq Renaissance and Peace Bloc	1,091	0.86	–
Independent	1,057	0.84	–
Independent	1,056	0.84	–
National Contract Alliance	1,033	0.82	–
National Contract Alliance	1,023	0.81	–
Kurdistan Democratic Party	972	0.77	–
Progress Party	960	0.76	–
United for Iraq	953	0.75	–
Azem Alliance	929	0.74	–
National Party of the Masses	894	0.71	–
Independent	884	0.70	–
Independent	824	0.65	–
Azem Alliance	802	0.64	–
Alliance of Nation State Forces	741	0.59	–
Independent	707	0.56	–
Iraq Renaissance and Peace Bloc	701	0.56	–
Progress Party	694	0.55	–
Independent	658	0.52	–
Azem Alliance	652	0.52	–
Independent	642	0.51	–
Al-Atifak Iraqi National Party	621	0.49	–
Independent	536	0.42	–
Qadimun	519	0.41	–
Independent	506	0.40	–
Independent	499	0.40	–
United for Iraq	470	0.37	–
National Contract Alliance	432	0.34	–
Kurdistani Coalition	384	0.30	–
Independent	374	0.30	–
Kurdistani Coalition	357	0.28	–
Capable Coalition	329	0.26	–
Independent	328	0.26	–
Azem Alliance	321	0.25	–
Independent	314	0.25	–
Iraq Renaissance and Peace Bloc	312	0.25	–
Independent	309	0.24	–
Achievement Movement	284	0.22	–
Independent	274	0.22	–
National Depth Alliance	216	0.17	–
Independent	211	0.17	–
Rescuers	210	0.17	–
Independent	207	0.16	–
Independent	206	0.16	–
Homeland Safety Coalition	206	0.16	–
Achievement Movement	177	0.14	–
Capable Coalition	138	0.11	–
Tayyār al-Kalimah	135	0.11	–
Independent	132	0.10	–
Independent	129	0.10	–
Capable Coalition	122	0.10	–
Homeland Safety Coalition	113	0.09	–
Independent	95	0.08	–
Independent	89	0.07	–
Independent	84	0.07	–
Iraqi National Project	83	0.07	–
Educators' Gathering	71	0.06	–
Al-Wataniya	61	0.05	–
Qadimun	51	0.04	–
National Depth Alliance	48	0.04	–
Conservatives	44	0.03	–
Independent	44	0.03	–
National Party of the Masses	41	0.03	–
New Iraq Gathering	41	0.03	–
Hasim Movement for Reform	23	0.02	–
Coalition of Iraqi Unity	21	0.02	–
Total	126,277	100.00	5
Valid votes	142,700	94.58	
Invalid/blank votes	8,176	5.42	
Total votes	150,876	100.00	
Registered voters/turnout	320,427	47.09	

District 7
Party	Votes	%	Seats
Progress Party	12,742	14.40	1
Fatah Alliance	7,465	8.44	1
Progress Party	5,680	6.42	1
Progress Party	5,580	6.31	–
Independent	4,505	5.09	–
Independent	4,351	4.92	–
Progress Party	3,917	4.43	–
Progress Party	3,430	3.88	–
Iraq Renaissance and Peace Bloc	2,815	3.18	–
Independent	2,753	3.11	–
Hasim Movement for Reform	2,701	3.05	–
National Awakening Gathering	2,574	2.91	–
Azem Alliance	2,487	2.81	–
United for Iraq	2,244	2.54	–
Kurdistani Coalition	2,058	2.33	–
Independent	1,991	2.25	–
United for Iraq	1,989	2.25	–
Alliance of Nation State Forces	1,761	1.99	–
National Contract Alliance	1,632	1.84	–
Iraqi Loyalty Movement	1,342	1.52	–
Independent	1,232	1.39	–
National Party of the Masses	919	1.04	–
Progress Party	907	1.03	–
Independent	741	0.84	–
Azem Alliance	731	0.83	–
Independent	716	0.81	–
Homeland Safety Coalition	596	0.67	–
Al-Istqrar Bloc	589	0.67	–
Iraqi National Project	499	0.56	–
Independent	460	0.52	–
Iraq Renaissance and Peace Bloc	457	0.52	–
Independent	442	0.50	–
Iraqi National Project	434	0.49	–
Hasim Movement for Reform	402	0.45	–
Iraqi Loyalty Movement	395	0.45	–
Rescuers	386	0.44	–
Alliance of Nation State Forces	383	0.43	–
State of Law Coalition	363	0.41	–
Tayyār al-Kalimah	361	0.41	–
Qadimun	347	0.39	–
Azem Alliance	271	0.31	–
Azem Alliance	255	0.29	–
Al-Atifak Iraqi National Party	219	0.25	–
Capable Coalition	201	0.23	–
Independent	175	0.20	–
Independent	173	0.20	–
Independent	169	0.19	–
Independent	165	0.19	–
Hasim Movement for Reform	144	0.16	–
Qadimun	140	0.16	–
Independent	128	0.14	–
Youth Movement for Change	116	0.13	–
Rescuers	110	0.12	–
National Product Party	103	0.12	–
National Correction Party	97	0.11	–
Homeland Safety Coalition	97	0.11	–
Tasmim Alliance	92	0.10	–
Al-Faw Zakho Coalition	87	0.10	–
Kurdistan Social Democratic Party	87	0.10	–
Independent	83	0.09	–
Qadimun	68	0.08	–
Azem Alliance	60	0.07	–
Conservatives	48	0.05	–
Total	88,465	100.00	3
Valid votes	96,583	91.30	
Invalid/blank votes	9,207	8.70	
Total votes	105,790	100.00	
Registered voters/turnout	246,903	42.85	

District 8
Party	Votes	%	Seats
Progress Party	8,305	8.47	1
Independent	6,874	7.01	1
Progress Party	6,390	6.52	1
Independent	4,979	5.08	–
Progress Party	4,926	5.02	1
Progress Party	4,364	4.45	–
National Correction Party	3,898	3.98	–
Iraqi National Project	3,637	3.71	–
United for Iraq	3,387	3.45	–
Azem Alliance	3,298	3.36	–
National Party of the Masses	3,147	3.21	–
Independent	3,111	3.17	–
National Contract Alliance	2,955	3.01	–
Alliance of Nation State Forces	2,506	2.56	–
Azem Alliance	2,119	2.16	–
National Product Party	1,831	1.87	–
Independent	1,647	1.68	–
Kurdistan Democratic Party	1,636	1.67	–
Independent	1,606	1.64	–
Progress Party	1,582	1.61	–
National Party of the Masses	1,555	1.59	–
Hasim Movement for Reform	1,546	1.58	–
Progress Party	1,537	1.57	–
Independent	1,521	1.55	–
Progress Party	1,410	1.44	–
Independent	1,366	1.39	–
Independent	1,356	1.38	–
Iraqi Turkmen Front	1,346	1.37	–
Independent	1,040	1.06	–
Iraq Renaissance and Peace Bloc	841	0.86	–
Azem Alliance	830	0.85	–
National Contract Alliance	830	0.85	–
Iraqi National Project	744	0.76	–
Independent	663	0.68	–
Independent	629	0.64	–
Independent	576	0.59	–
National Party of the Masses	495	0.50	–
National Depth Alliance	492	0.50	–
Independent	434	0.44	–
Independent	419	0.43	–
Hasim Movement for Reform	391	0.40	–
Iraq Renaissance and Peace Bloc	389	0.40	–
Independent	343	0.35	–
United for Iraq	342	0.35	–
National Correction Party	307	0.31	–
Independent	304	0.31	–
Al-Atifak Iraqi National Party	276	0.28	–
Eqtadar Watan Party	274	0.28	–
Iraqi National Movement	254	0.26	–
Independent	236	0.24	–
Eqtadar Watan Party	231	0.24	–
National Party of the Masses	231	0.24	–
Independent	229	0.23	–
Independent	225	0.23	–
Iraq Renaissance and Peace Bloc	221	0.23	–
National Sacrifice Block	213	0.22	–
National Correction Party	151	0.15	–
National Certainty Party	150	0.15	–
Capable Coalition	146	0.15	–
Qadimun	146	0.15	–
Qadimun	143	0.15	–
Iraq Renaissance and Peace Bloc	139	0.14	–
Tayyār al-Kalimah	118	0.12	–
Iraqi Republican Group Party	113	0.12	–
Iraqi Republican Group Party	103	0.11	–
Qadimun	89	0.09	–
National Depth Alliance	82	0.08	–
Tayyār al-Kalimah	77	0.08	–
Qadimun	74	0.08	–
Rescuers	70	0.07	–
Al-Istqrar Bloc	50	0.05	–
National Approach Alliance	44	0.04	–
Iraqi Harmony	32	0.03	–
Youth Movement for Change	32	0.03	–
Total	98,053	100.00	4
Valid votes	108,151	92.01	
Invalid/blank votes	9,390	7.99	
Total votes	117,541	100.00	
Registered voters/turnout	260,248	45.16	

Election results by district in Qadisiyah Governorate

District 1
Party	Votes	%	Seats
Sadrist Movement	9,371	8.22	1
Emtidad Movement	9,109	7.99	1
Ishraqat Kanoon	8,939	7.84	1
Fatah Alliance	7,271	6.38	–
State of Law Coalition	6,197	5.43	–
Independent	5,821	5.10	–
Qadimun	5,522	4.84	–
Iraqi Loyalty Movement	5,511	4.83	–
Sadrist Movement	5,459	4.79	1
Emtidad Movement	5,202	4.56	–
Professionals Party for Reconstruction	4,158	3.65	–
Eqtadar Watan Party	2,980	2.61	–
Independent	2,893	2.54	–
National Product Party	2,884	2.53	–
Alliance of Nation State Forces	2,799	2.45	–
Alliance of Nation State Forces	2,642	2.32	–
Wathiqoon	2,614	2.29	–
National Approach Alliance	2,428	2.13	–
Independent	2,239	1.96	–
Alliance of Nation State Forces	1,761	1.54	–
Al-Faw Zakho Coalition	1,704	1.49	–
Independent	1,692	1.48	–
Rights Movement	1,456	1.28	–
Independent	1,396	1.22	–
Iraqi Loyalty Movement	1,322	1.16	–
Independent	1,206	1.06	–
Furatayn Movement	1,160	1.02	–
Independent	904	0.79	–
Independent	706	0.62	–
Confrontation	695	0.61	–
Independent	689	0.60	–
Supporters of the Truth Nation	677	0.59	–
Qadimun	506	0.44	–
Independent	505	0.44	–
Conservatives	469	0.41	–
Rescuers	463	0.41	–
Qadimun	408	0.36	–
National Hopes Bloc	354	0.31	–
Al-Wataniya	340	0.30	–
Civic Party	326	0.29	–
Wathiqoon	296	0.26	–
Conservatives	285	0.25	–
Al-Wataniya	229	0.20	–
Homeland Safety Coalition	191	0.17	–
Qadimun	129	0.11	–
Civic Party	93	0.08	–
Trust Party	34	0.03	–
Total	114,035	100.00	4
Valid votes	116,268	94.17	
Invalid/blank votes	7,199	5.83	
Total votes	123,467	100.00	
Registered voters/turnout	292,356	42.23	

District 2
Party	Votes	%	Seats
Independent	11,041	13.64	1
State of Law Coalition	9,705	11.99	1
Sadrist Movement	8,972	11.08	–
Fatah Alliance	8,067	9.96	1
Furatayn Movement	6,254	7.72	–
Independent	5,866	7.24	–
Alliance of Nation State Forces	5,773	7.13	–
Independent	3,086	3.81	–
Ishraqat Kanoon	2,942	3.63	–
Rights Movement	2,315	2.86	–
Eqtadar Watan Party	2,251	2.78	–
Supporters of the Truth Nation	2,048	2.53	–
Independent	1,903	2.35	–
Achievement Movement	1,462	1.81	–
Emtidad Movement	1,415	1.75	–
National Product Party	1,390	1.72	–
Professionals Party for Reconstruction	1,385	1.71	–
Qadimun	1,120	1.38	–
Independent	924	1.14	–
Trust Party	870	1.07	–
National Contract Alliance	548	0.68	–
Conservatives	517	0.64	–
Al-Nour Movement - Uprising and Change	463	0.57	–
Qadimun	302	0.37	–
Civic Party	180	0.22	–
National Assembly of the People of Iraq	101	0.12	–
Independent	72	0.09	–
Total	80,972	100.00	3
Valid votes	76,068	96.34	
Invalid/blank votes	2,888	3.66	
Total votes	78,956	100.00	
Registered voters/turnout	172,277	45.83	

District 3
Party	Votes	%	Seats
State of Law Coalition	15,613	13.50	1
Fatah Alliance	13,855	11.98	1
Sadrist Movement	9,604	8.31	1
Eqtadar Watan Party	7,453	6.45	1
Independent	6,603	5.71	–
Alliance of Nation State Forces	6,601	5.71	–
Professionals Party for Reconstruction	5,778	5.00	–
National Contract Alliance	5,383	4.66	–
Ishraqat Kanoon	4,999	4.32	–
Qadimun	4,748	4.11	–
Tasmim Alliance	4,345	3.76	–
National Product Party	3,920	3.39	–
Independent	3,757	3.25	–
National Approach Alliance	3,641	3.15	–
Alliance of Nation State Forces	2,994	2.59	–
Qadimun	2,221	1.92	–
Ḥarakat Nāzl Akhdh Ḥaqqī al-Dīmuqrāṭīyah	2,044	1.77	–
Independent	2,019	1.75	–
Civic Party	2,017	1.74	–
Iraqi Loyalty Movement	1,308	1.13	–
Independent	1,274	1.10	–
Independent	1,045	0.90	–
Confrontation	899	0.78	–
Independent	821	0.71	–
Independent	766	0.66	–
Qadimun	622	0.54	–
Alliance of Nation State Forces	513	0.44	–
Rescuers	439	0.38	–
Independent	199	0.17	–
Qadimun	154	0.13	–
Total	115,635	100.00	4
Valid votes	109,125	95.31	
Invalid/blank votes	5,367	4.69	
Total votes	114,492	100.00	
Registered voters/turnout	255,363	44.83	

Election results by district in Saladin Governorate

District 1
Party	Votes	%	Seats
Independent	13,898	11.44	1
Progress Party	12,730	10.48	1
Azem Alliance	12,654	10.42	1
Our People are Our Identity	8,232	6.78	–
Progress Party	8,205	6.76	–
Azem Alliance	6,935	5.71	–
National Contract Alliance	6,296	5.18	–
Azem Alliance	5,163	4.25	–
Independent	4,343	3.58	–
Azem Alliance	3,629	2.99	–
Independent	3,359	2.77	–
Independent	3,071	2.53	–
Independent	2,696	2.22	1
Azem Alliance	2,500	2.06	–
Azem Alliance	2,371	1.95	–
Independent	2,157	1.78	–
Qadimun	2,141	1.76	–
Independent	1,856	1.53	–
Independent	1,690	1.39	–
Azem Alliance	1,672	1.38	–
Independent	1,510	1.24	–
Independent	1,456	1.20	–
National Contract Alliance	1,306	1.08	–
National Contract Alliance	1,210	1.00	–
Independent	1,175	0.97	–
Independent	928	0.76	–
Rescuers	916	0.75	–
United for Iraq	705	0.58	–
Qadimun	643	0.53	–
National Correction Party	637	0.52	–
Independent	519	0.43	–
Independent	510	0.42	–
Independent	399	0.33	–
Rescuers	394	0.32	–
Ḥarakat Nāzl Akhdh Ḥaqqī al-Dīmuqrāṭīyah	335	0.28	–
Independent	330	0.27	–
Al-Aerobion Party	313	0.26	–
Al-Atifak Iraqi National Party	300	0.25	–
Independent	299	0.25	–
Independent	291	0.24	–
Our People are Our Identity	290	0.24	–
Independent	240	0.20	–
Alliance of Nation State Forces	197	0.16	–
Qadimun	191	0.16	–
United for Iraq	180	0.15	–
Independent	109	0.09	–
Rescuers	96	0.08	–
New Iraq Gathering	80	0.07	–
Progress Party	67	0.06	–
Independent	51	0.04	–
Qadimun	43	0.04	–
Al-Atifak Iraqi National Party	34	0.03	–
Independent	30	0.02	–
Alliance of Nation State Forces	25	0.02	–
National Depth Alliance	19	0.02	–
Independent	9	0.01	–
Independent	6	0.00	–
Total	121,441	100.00	4
Valid votes	132,473	96.19	
Invalid/blank votes	5,252	3.81	
Total votes	137,725	100.00	
Registered voters/turnout	295,928	46.54	

District 2
Party	Votes	%	Seats
Fatah Alliance	14,823	9.58	1
Progress Party	13,419	8.67	1
Kurdistani Coalition	12,159	7.86	1
Fatah Alliance	11,771	7.61	–
Independent	10,982	7.10	–
Our People are Our Identity	8,654	5.59	–
Sadrist Movement	7,535	4.87	–
State of Law Coalition	7,198	4.65	–
Independent	7,172	4.63	1
Independent	6,474	4.18	–
National Contract Alliance	6,132	3.96	–
State of Law Coalition	5,123	3.31	–
Our People are Our Identity	4,263	2.75	–
Our People are Our Identity	3,414	2.21	–
Independent	3,208	2.07	–
Azem Alliance	2,959	1.91	–
Unified Iraqi Turkmen Front	2,669	1.72	–
Alliance of Nation State Forces	2,610	1.69	–
Fatah Alliance	2,139	1.38	–
Azem Alliance	2,092	1.35	–
Kurdistan Democratic Party	1,838	1.19	–
Azem Alliance	1,408	0.91	–
Independent	1,397	0.90	–
Independent	1,357	0.88	–
Progress Party	1,304	0.84	–
National Contract Alliance	1,009	0.65	–
Sadrist Movement	980	0.63	–
Independent	884	0.57	–
Azem Alliance	872	0.56	–
Capable Coalition	684	0.44	–
Progress Party	670	0.43	–
Independent	618	0.40	–
National Correction Party	602	0.39	–
Progress Party	593	0.38	–
Our People are Our Identity	561	0.36	–
Independent	501	0.32	–
United for Iraq	391	0.25	–
Independent	349	0.23	–
Independent	344	0.22	–
Independent	338	0.22	–
Independent	338	0.22	–
National Depth Alliance	332	0.21	–
Iraqi Loyalty Movement	286	0.18	–
New Iraq Gathering	281	0.18	–
Azem Alliance	278	0.18	–
Independent	268	0.17	–
Alliance of Nation State Forces	260	0.17	–
National Approach Alliance	234	0.15	–
Qadimun	214	0.14	–
Kurdistani Coalition	175	0.11	–
Independent	106	0.07	–
Tayyār al-Kalimah	86	0.06	–
New Iraq Gathering	78	0.05	–
Independent	71	0.05	–
Independent	70	0.05	–
Qadimun	54	0.03	–
Independent	48	0.03	–
Independent	48	0.03	–
Al-Atifak Iraqi National Party	25	0.02	–
Civil Democratic Alliance	22	0.01	–
Total	154,770	100.00	4
Valid votes	146,923	95.38	
Invalid/blank votes	7,111	4.62	
Total votes	154,034	100.00	
Registered voters/turnout	301,931	51.02	

District 3
Party	Votes	%	Seats
Homeland Party	12,266	8.16	1
Our People are Our Identity	11,834	7.87	1
Our People are Our Identity	11,471	7.63	1
Progress Party	9,826	6.53	–
Azem Alliance	8,211	5.46	–
Progress Party	7,849	5.22	–
Our People are Our Identity	7,840	5.21	1
Al-Istqrar Bloc	6,708	4.46	–
Azem Alliance	6,443	4.28	–
Azem Alliance	6,350	4.22	–
Azem Alliance	5,834	3.88	–
Elite Party	5,596	3.72	–
Fatah Alliance	5,223	3.47	–
National Contract Alliance	4,981	3.31	–
Independent	4,253	2.83	–
National Correction Party	3,941	2.62	–
United for Iraq	2,787	1.85	–
Progress Party	2,113	1.41	–
Independent	2,037	1.35	–
Al-Aerobion Party	1,971	1.31	–
Independent	1,848	1.23	–
Independent	1,690	1.12	–
Iraqi Wafd Party	1,586	1.05	–
Iraq Renaissance and Peace Bloc	1,501	1.00	–
Our People are Our Identity	1,487	0.99	–
Azem Alliance	1,359	0.90	–
Independent	1,276	0.85	–
Iraq Renaissance and Peace Bloc	1,149	0.76	–
Independent	990	0.66	–
Iraqi Loyalty Movement	892	0.59	–
Independent	884	0.59	–
Independent	763	0.51	–
Al-Aerobion Party	751	0.50	–
State of Law Coalition	669	0.44	–
Tasmim Alliance	624	0.41	–
Iraqi National Project	605	0.40	–
Iraqi National Project	557	0.37	–
Azem Alliance	554	0.37	–
Independent	499	0.33	–
Independent	480	0.32	–
Independent	380	0.25	–
Independent	351	0.23	–
Ahālī al-Sharqāṭ	334	0.22	–
Eqtadar Watan Party	229	0.15	–
Independent	225	0.15	–
Ahālī al-Sharqāṭ	161	0.11	–
Independent	159	0.11	–
Progress Party	87	0.06	–
Qadimun	83	0.06	–
Kafa Movement	70	0.05	–
Independent	66	0.04	–
Independent	61	0.04	–
Rescuers	54	0.04	–
Rescuers	48	0.03	–
Alliance of Nation State Forces	34	0.02	–
Independent	32	0.02	–
Qadimun	30	0.02	–
Our People are Our Identity	30	0.02	–
Ahālī al-Sharqāṭ	21	0.01	–
Independent	21	0.01	–
Independent	21	0.01	–
Independent	19	0.01	–
Qadimun	18	0.01	–
Independent	18	0.01	–
Al-Atifak Iraqi National Party	16	0.01	–
Civic Party	15	0.01	–
Independent	15	0.01	–
Qadimun	14	0.01	–
Our People are Our Identity	13	0.01	–
Civil Democratic Alliance	12	0.01	–
Independent	11	0.01	–
Independent	9	0.01	–
Al-Istqrar Bloc	5	0.00	–
Independent	3	0.00	–
Total	150,363	100.00	4
Valid votes	146,928	97.12	
Invalid/blank votes	4,361	2.88	
Total votes	151,289	100.00	
Registered voters/turnout	274,915	55.03	

Election results by district in Sulaymaniyah Governorate

District 1
Party	Votes	%	Seats
New Generation Movement	18,640	27.90	1
Kurdistan Democratic Party	9,477	14.19	1
Kurdistani Coalition	8,433	12.62	1
Independent	8,157	12.21	1
Kurdistani Coalition	6,669	9.98	–
Kurdistani Coalition	6,368	9.53	–
Kurdistani Coalition	4,526	6.78	–
Independent	2,935	4.39	–
Independent	548	0.82	–
Independent	524	0.78	–
Kurdistan Social Democratic Party	232	0.35	–
Qadimun	159	0.24	–
Kurdistan Social Democratic Party	132	0.20	–
Total	66,800	100.00	4
Valid votes	71,312	77.82	
Invalid/blank votes	20,329	22.18	
Total votes	91,641	100.00	
Registered voters/turnout	265,994	34.45	

District 2
Party	Votes	%	Seats
New Generation Movement	25,022	30.91	1
Kurdistani Coalition	14,780	18.26	1
Kurdistani Coalition	11,765	14.53	1
Kurdistan Democratic Party	9,580	11.83	–
Kurdistan Justice Group	8,092	10.00	–
Kurdistani Coalition	5,242	6.48	–
Independent	2,910	3.59	–
Independent	542	0.67	–
Independent	529	0.65	–
Independent	485	0.60	–
Kurdistan Social Democratic Party	480	0.59	–
Independent	468	0.58	–
Kurdistan Social Democratic Party	372	0.46	–
Independent	356	0.44	–
Independent	261	0.32	–
Qadimun	69	0.09	–
Total	80,953	100.00	3
Valid votes	90,198	77.86	
Invalid/blank votes	25,650	22.14	
Total votes	115,848	100.00	
Registered voters/turnout	331,108	34.99	

District 3
Party	Votes	%	Seats
Kurdistani Coalition	15,952	24.00	1
Independent	14,719	22.15	1
New Generation Movement	12,082	18.18	1
Kurdistan Justice Group	11,431	17.20	–
Kurdistan Democratic Party	11,073	16.66	–
Iraqi Harmony	430	0.65	–
Kurdistan Social Democratic Party	426	0.64	–
Kurdistan Toilers' Party	348	0.52	–
Total	66,461	100.00	3
Valid votes	67,092	80.75	
Invalid/blank votes	15,991	19.25	
Total votes	83,083	100.00	
Registered voters/turnout	198,231	41.91	

District 4
Party	Votes	%	Seats
New Generation Movement	28,987	25.60	1
Kurdistan Justice Group	25,116	22.18	1
Kurdistani Coalition	19,714	17.41	1
Kurdistani Coalition	17,307	15.28	1
Kurdistan Democratic Party	15,240	13.46	–
Kurdistani Coalition	5,197	4.59	–
Independent	503	0.44	–
Independent	452	0.40	–
Kurdistan Toilers' Party	249	0.22	–
Iraqi Harmony	247	0.22	–
Kurdistan Social Democratic Party	220	0.19	–
Total	113,232	100.00	4
Valid votes	116,021	80.31	
Invalid/blank votes	28,448	19.69	
Total votes	144,469	100.00	
Registered voters/turnout	266,055	54.30	

District 5
Party	Votes	%	Seats
New Generation Movement	21,587	33.10	1
Kurdistan Democratic Party	9,521	14.60	1
Kurdistani Coalition	7,851	12.04	1
Kurdistani Coalition	7,504	11.51	1
Kurdistani Coalition	7,471	11.45	–
Independent	6,255	9.59	–
Kurdistani Coalition	2,881	4.42	–
Kurdistan Social Democratic Party	554	0.85	–
Iraqi Turkmen Front	445	0.68	–
Independent	349	0.54	–
Iraqi Harmony	319	0.49	–
Qadimun	162	0.25	–
Qadimun	154	0.24	–
Kurdistan Social Democratic Party	101	0.15	–
Qadimun	67	0.10	–
Total	65,221	100.00	4
Valid votes	71,740	78.38	
Invalid/blank votes	19,792	21.62	
Total votes	91,532	100.00	
Registered voters/turnout	232,319	39.40	

Election results by district in Wasit Governorate

District 1
Party	Votes	%	Seats
Sadrist Movement	14,879	13.85	1
Sadrist Movement	12,435	11.58	1
Independent	10,291	9.58	1
Alliance of Nation State Forces	7,610	7.08	1
Wasit Independents Bloc	7,265	6.76	–
Emtidad Movement	6,665	6.21	–
Fatah Alliance	5,349	4.98	–
Gathering of Loyal Hands	5,311	4.94	–
Rights Movement	4,643	4.32	–
Tasmim Alliance	3,580	3.33	–
Ishraqat Kanoon	3,128	2.91	–
Independent	2,413	2.25	–
Gathering of Talents and Masses	2,360	2.20	–
Wathiqoon	2,284	2.13	–
Independent	2,186	2.04	–
Independent	1,664	1.55	–
Eqtadar Watan Party	1,337	1.24	–
Tasmim Alliance	1,189	1.11	–
Independent	1,164	1.08	–
Qadimun	1,125	1.05	–
Furatayn Movement	1,109	1.03	–
Capable Coalition	1,075	1.00	–
Confrontation	1,052	0.98	–
Iraqi Loyalty Movement	701	0.65	–
Independent	694	0.65	–
National Awareness Movement	603	0.56	–
Qadimun	596	0.55	–
Al-Wataniya	586	0.55	–
Independent	522	0.49	–
Independent	488	0.45	–
Qadimun	436	0.41	–
Wasit Independents Bloc	424	0.39	–
Independent	411	0.38	–
Tajammu' al-Qal'ah	391	0.36	–
Al-Nour Movement - Uprising and Change	358	0.33	–
Civic Party	335	0.31	–
Iraqi National Movement	318	0.30	–
National Depth Alliance	191	0.18	–
Wathiqoon	110	0.10	–
Alliance of Nation State Forces	84	0.08	–
Al-Daae Party	49	0.05	–
Total	107,411	100.00	4
Valid votes	142,585	94.91	
Invalid/blank votes	7,645	5.09	
Total votes	150,230	100.00	
Registered voters/turnout	333,121	45.10	

District 2
Party	Votes	%	Seats
Wasit Independents Bloc	12,524	13.53	1
Sadrist Movement	10,980	11.86	1
State of Law Coalition	8,709	9.41	–
Independent	7,813	8.44	–
Sadrist Movement	7,324	7.91	1
National Contract Alliance	6,475	6.99	–
Fatah Alliance	6,146	6.64	–
Eqtadar Watan Party	5,254	5.67	–
Alliance of Nation State Forces	4,878	5.27	–
Iraqi National Movement	3,110	3.36	–
Tasmim Alliance	2,856	3.08	–
Independent	2,576	2.78	–
Wasit Independents Bloc	1,968	2.13	–
Independent	1,791	1.93	–
Tasmim Alliance	1,614	1.74	–
Emtidad Movement	1,555	1.68	–
Independent	1,238	1.34	–
Wasit Independents Bloc	1,188	1.28	–
Independent	861	0.93	–
Gathering of Talents and Masses	809	0.87	–
Gathering of Loyal Hands	656	0.71	–
Independent	548	0.59	–
Independent	533	0.58	–
Qadimun	343	0.37	–
Alliance of Nation State Forces	341	0.37	–
Rescuers	306	0.33	–
National Contract Alliance	110	0.12	–
National Depth Alliance	89	0.10	–
Total	92,595	100.00	3
Valid votes	97,153	95.97	
Invalid/blank votes	4,075	4.03	
Total votes	101,228	100.00	
Registered voters/turnout	213,084	47.51	

District 3
Party	Votes	%	Seats
Sadrist Movement	10,746	10.28	1
Independent	9,079	8.68	1
State of Law Coalition	7,541	7.21	1
Fatah Alliance	6,089	5.82	1
Independent	5,215	4.99	–
Homeland Safety Coalition	5,000	4.78	–
Independent	4,915	4.70	–
Independent	4,815	4.60	–
Independent	4,660	4.46	–
Independent	4,492	4.30	–
Eqtadar Watan Party	4,114	3.93	–
Wasit Independents Bloc	4,038	3.86	–
National Product Party	3,719	3.56	–
Alliance of Nation State Forces	3,703	3.54	–
Wasit Independents Bloc	3,511	3.36	–
Independent	2,996	2.87	–
Independent	2,525	2.41	–
National Contract Alliance	2,216	2.12	–
Independent	1,768	1.69	–
Qadimun	1,575	1.51	–
Independent	1,422	1.36	–
Alliance of Nation State Forces	1,415	1.35	–
Progress Party	970	0.93	–
Independent	950	0.91	–
Capable Coalition	834	0.80	–
Alliance of Civilian Forces	813	0.78	–
Independent	602	0.58	–
Rescuers	595	0.57	–
Rights Movement	569	0.54	–
Qadimun	545	0.52	–
Alliance of Nation State Forces	504	0.48	–
Civic Party	495	0.47	–
Gathering of Loyal Hands	413	0.39	–
Trust Party	411	0.39	–
Achievement Movement	282	0.27	–
Confrontation	202	0.19	–
Gathering of Loyal Hands	193	0.18	–
Al-Nour Movement - Uprising and Change	191	0.18	–
Qadimun	161	0.15	–
Alliance of Nation State Forces	92	0.09	–
Independent	73	0.07	–
Civic Party	55	0.05	–
Independent	44	0.04	–
Tayyār al-Kalimah	23	0.02	–
Total	104,571	100.00	4
Valid votes	105,214	95.83	
Invalid/blank votes	4,574	4.17	
Total votes	109,788	100.00	
Registered voters/turnout	229,465	47.85	

Election results for minorities by constituency

Christian seat in Baghdad
Party	Votes	%	Seats
Babylon Movement	13,755	49.64	1
Independent	4,782	17.26	–
Independent	2,334	8.42	–
Hammurabi Coalition	2,003	7.23	–
Independent	1,950	7.04	–
Independent	1,106	3.99	–
Chaldean Syriac Assyrian Popular Council	964	3.48	–
Assyrian Democratic Movement	815	2.94	–
Total	27,709	100.00	1

Mandaean seat in Baghdad
Party	Votes	%	Seats
Independent	4,301	35.45	1
Independent	1,811	14.93	–
Independent	1,314	10.83	–
Independent	1,165	9.60	–
Independent	991	8.17	–
Independent	982	8.09	–
Independent	909	7.49	–
Independent	660	5.44	–
Total	12,133	100.00	1

Christian seat in Duhok
Party	Votes	%	Seats
Babylon Movement	13,630	45.01	1
Hammurabi Coalition	7,702	25.44	–
Assyrian Democratic Movement	4,727	15.61	–
Independent	2,361	7.80	–
Assyrian National Party	1,208	3.99	–
Chaldean Syriac Assyrian Popular Council	652	2.15	–
Total	30,280	100.00	1

Christian seat in Erbil
Party	Votes	%	Seats
Independent	5,495	21.58	1
Babylon Movement	5,126	20.13	–
Independent	4,792	18.82	–
Hammurabi Coalition	3,892	15.28	–
Chaldean Syriac Assyrian Popular Council	2,491	9.78	–
Beth Nahrain Patriotic Union	1,827	7.17	–
Assyrian Democratic Movement	1,254	4.92	–
Assyrian National Party	587	2.31	–
Total	25,464	100.00	1

Christian seat in Kirkuk
Party	Votes	%	Seats
Babylon Movement	5,278	41.09	1
Hammurabi Coalition	3,493	27.20	–
Assyrian Democratic Movement	2,217	17.26	–
Assyrian National Party	1,015	7.90	–
Chaldean Syriac Assyrian Popular Council	841	6.55	–
Total	12,844	100.00	1

Christian seat in Nineveh
Party	Votes	%	Seats
Babylon Movement	12,589	58.00	1
Chaldean Syriac Assyrian Popular Council	2,641	12.17	–
Independent	2,299	10.59	–
Assyrian Democratic Movement	1,559	7.18	–
Independent	1,496	6.89	–
Hammurabi Coalition	1,122	5.17	–
Total	21,706	100.00	1

Shabak seat in Nineveh
Party	Votes	%	Seats
Independent	20,827	52.71	1
Independent	13,877	35.12	–
Independent	2,534	6.41	–
Independent	1,232	3.12	–
Independent	635	1.61	–
Independent	210	0.53	–
Independent	153	0.39	–
Independent	48	0.12	–
Total	39,516	100.00	1

Yazidi seat in Nineveh
Party	Votes	%	Seats
Yazidi Progress Party	3,988	30.83	1
Yazidi Democratic Party	2,875	22.23	–
Independent	2,564	19.82	–
Yazidi Movement for Reform and Progress	1,791	13.85	–
Independent	1,106	8.55	–
Independent	493	3.81	–
Independent	118	0.91	–
Total	12,935	100.00	1

Feyli seat in Wasit
Party	Votes	%	Seats
Independent	20,832	48.03	1
Independent	4,615	10.64	–
Independent	3,998	9.22	–
Independent	3,143	7.25	–
Independent	2,998	6.91	–
Independent	2,842	6.55	–
Independent	1,869	4.31	–
Independent	1,669	3.85	–
Independent	1,155	2.66	–
Independent	250	0.58	–
Total	43,371	100.00	1

== Aftermath ==
=== Conduct ===
The United Nations Security Council issued a statement congratulating the people and Government of Iraq on the smooth conduct of a “technically sound election” and deploring related threats of violence. Jeanine Hennis-Plasschaert, Special Representative of United Nations, said the vote was generally peaceful and well-run. She added that “there is much for Iraqis to be proud of in this election.” She acknowledged that elections and their outcomes can provoke strong feelings, in Iraq or in any democracy across the globe and called for all groups to accept the outcome of the electoral process.
