= List of Arab newspapers =

This is a list of Arabic-language and other newspapers published in the Arab world. The Arab newspaper industry started in the early 19th century with the Iraqi newspaper Journal Iraq published by Ottoman Wali, Dawud Pasha, in Baghdad in 1816.

== International Arab papers ==
- Al-Arab (United Kingdom)
- Al-Hayat (United Kingdom)
- Al-Quds al-Arabi (United Kingdom)
- Abu al-Hawl (Brazil)
- Asharq Alawsat (United Kingdom)
- Hoona London (United Kingdom)
- Oz Arab Media (Australia)

== Algeria ==
=== Algerian newspapers in Arabic ===
- Echorouk (Arabic, English)
- El Ayem El Djazairia
- El Djazaïr
- El Djoumhouria
- El Heddaf
- El Khabar (Arabic, English, French)
- El Massa

=== Algerian newspapers in French ===
- Alger Hebdo (French)
- Alger républicain (French)
- Les Annonces Spécialisées (French)
- L'Authentique (French)
- Le Buteur (French)
- Le Carrefour d'Algérie (French)
- Le Citoyen (French)
- Compétition (French)
- Côte Ouest (French)
- Le Courrier d'Algérie (French)
- Les Débats (French)
- La Depeche (French)
- La Dépêche de Kabylie (French)
- L'Echo d'Oran (French)
- El Acil (French)
- El Moudjahid (French)
- El Watan (French)
- L'époque (French)
- L'Est Républicain (French)
- L'Expression (French)
- La Gazette d'Alger (French)
- La gazette des Finances (French)
- L'index (French)
- Infosoir (French)
- It-mag (French)
- Le Jeune Indépendant (French)
- Le jour d'Algérie (French)
- Liberté (French)
- Liberté économie (French)
- Liberté FOOT (French)
- Maracana Hebdo (French)
- Le Maghreb (French)
- Le Mobile GSM (French)
- La Nouvelle République (French)
- Les Nouvelles Confidences (French)
- Ouest Tribune (French)
- Le Quotidien d'Oran (French)
- Le Soir d'Algerie (French)
- Transaction d'Algérie (French)
- La Tribune (French)
- La Voix de l'Oranie (French)

== Bahrain ==
- Akhbar Al Khaleej
- Al Ayam
- Al-Wasat
- Al Watan
- Bahrain Mirror (Arabic, English)
- Daily Tribune (English)
- Gulf Daily News (English)
- Gulf Madhyamam (Malayalam)

== Egypt ==
- Akhbar el-Yom
- Akher Saa
- Akher Saa Al Musawara
- Al-Ahram
- Al-Ahram Hebdo (French)
- Al-Ahram Weekly (English)
- Al Ahrar
- Al Akhbar
- Al Alam Al Youm
- Al-Arabi
- Al Aroussa
- Al-Dustour
- Al Gomhuria
- Al-Masry Al-Youm
- Al-Maydān
- Al Messa
- Al Moayd
- Al-Osboa
- Al Shaab
- Al Shorouk
- Al Tahrir
- Al-Wafd
- Al-Waqa'i' al-Masriyya (Arabic, Turkish)
- Aqidati
- Arev (Armenian)
- Daily News Egypt (English)
- The Daily Star (English)
- Egypt News (English)
- Egypt Today (English, monthly)
- The Egyptian Gazette (English)
- El Fagr
- El-Ghad
- Housaper (Armenian)
- Middle East Times (English)
- Le Progrès Egyptien (French)
- Tchahagir (Armenian)
- Watani
- Youm7

== Eritrea ==
- Eritrea al-Haditha

== Iran ==
- Kayhan Al Arabi

== Iraq ==
- Al Anbaa
- Al Mada
- Al-Mashriq
- Al-Mutamar
- Al Sabaah
- Awena (Kurdish)
- Azzaman
- Bahra
- Hawlati (Kurdish)
- Iraq Today (English)
- The Kurdish Globe
- Rozhnama (Kurdish)
- SOMA Digest (English)
- Xebat (Kurdish)
- Journal Iraq (Arabic)

== Israel ==
- Al-Ittihad
- Kul al-Arab
- Al-Madina

== Jordan ==
- Ad-Dustour
- Al-Ahali
- Al Anbat
- Al-Arab Al-Yawm
- Al Ghad
- Al-liwa
- Al Ra'i
- Assabeel
- The Jordan Times (English)
- Shihan
- The Star (English)

== Kuwait ==
- Al-Anbaa (Ar)
- Al Kuwaitiya (Ar)
- al-Qabas
- Al Rai
- al-Watan
- Alwasat
- Arab Times (English)
- Kuwait Times (English)
- Taleea
- Gulf Madhyamam (Malayalam)

== Lebanon ==
- Ad Diyar
- Al-Ahd Ul'Jadid
- al-Akhbar
- Al Amal
- Al Anwar
- al-Balad
- Al-Intiqad
- Al Joumhouria
- Al-Kalima
- Al-Kifah al-Arabi
- Al Liwaa
- Al-Massira
- Al-Mustaqbal
- Al-Nahar
- Al-Ousbou' al-Arabi
- Al-Safir
- Al-Sharq
- Al-Waie
- Al-Watan al- Arabi
- Beirut Times
- Daily Star (English)
- Hamzat Wassel (Arabic - French)
- Monday Morning (English)
- L'Orient Le Jour (French)
- La Revue du Liban (French)

== Libya ==
- al-Fajr al-Jadid
- al-Jamahiriyah
- Al-Shams
- al-Zahf Al-Akhdar

== Mauritania ==
- Akhbar Nouakchott
- Nouakchott Info (French)

== Morocco ==
- al-Alam
- al-Ayam (Morocco)
- al-Jarida al-Maghribia (French)
- as-Sabah
- Attajdid
- Aujourd'hui Le Maroc (French)
- Bayane al-Yaoume
- L'Économiste (French)
- La Gazette du Maroc (French)
- Libération (Morocco) (French)
- Le Matin (French)
- Morocco Times
- La Nouvelle Tribune (French)
- L'Opinion (French)
- La Verité (French)
- La Vie Éco (French)

== Oman ==
- Al Watan
- Ashabiba
- Oman Observer (English)
- Oman Tribune (English)
- Times of Oman (English)
- Gulf Madhyamam (Malayalam)

== Palestine ==
- Al Ayyam
- al-Hayat al-Jadida
- Al Karmil
- Al Manar
- Al Massar
- Al Quds
- Filasteen al-Muslimah
- Falastin (1911-1967)

== Qatar ==
- Al Raya
- Al Sharq
- Al-Watan
- Gulf Times (English)
- The Peninsula (English)
- Qatar Journal (English)
- Qatar Tribune (English)
- Gulf Madhyamam (Malayalam)

== Saudi Arabia ==
- Al Eqtisadiah (Arabia)
- Al Jazirah (Arabic)
- Al Madina
- Al Riyadh (Arabic)
- Al Watan (Arabic)
- Al Yaum
- Arab News (English)
- Naseej
- Okaz
- Saudi Gazette (English)
- Gulf Madhyamam (Malayalam)

== Somalia ==
- Dawan (Somali)
- Yool (Somali)
- Ogaal Newspaper (Somali)
- Banadir (English)
- Jamhuuriya (Somali)
- Geeska Afrika
- Codka Shacabka Official (Puntland)
- Kaaha-Bari (Puntland)
- Saxansaxo
- Somaliland Today
- Waaberi (English)
- Waaheen (Somali)
- Hubaal (Somali)
- Warsugan (Somali)
- Saxafi (Somali)
- Foore (Somali)
- Haatuf (Somali)
- Sahan (Somali)

== South Sudan ==
- Salaam Junub Sudan
- Al-Watan

== Sudan ==
- Adaraweesh (magazine)
- Al Rayaam (daily)

== Syria ==
- Al-Ayam
- al-Furat
- Al Jamahir
- Al-Ouruba
- Al Thawra
- Al-Watan
- Al-Wehda
- Syria Times (English)
- Syria Today (English)
- Tishreen

== Tunisia ==
- Al-Chourouk
- Al-Horria
- As-Sabah
- Elkhabar, Journal Électronique
- Es-Sahafa
- L'Économiste Maghrébin (French)
- La Presse de Tunisie (French)
- Le Quotidien (French)
- Le Renouveau (French)
- LeTemps (French)
- Tunis Hebdo (French)
- Le Soir de Tunisie (Arabic)

== Turkey ==
- Daily Sabah (printed edition in English, online edition in Arabic)

== United Arab Emirates ==
- al-Bayan
- Al-Ittihad
- Emirates Business 24/7 (English)
- Gulf News (English)
- Khaleej Times (English)
- The National (English)
- Gulf Madhyamam (Malayalam)

== Yemen ==
- Al Ayyam
- Al Jumhuriya
- Al-Thawra
- Yemen Observer (English)
- Yemen Times (English)

== See also ==
- List of Arabic-language newspapers published in the United States

== Notes and references ==
- Arab press. pickyournewspaper.com.
- Newspapers. arab2.com.
- Arabic news. arabic-radio-tv.com.
- Arabic newspapers, Arab news. newoxxo.com.
- Periodicals. Zentrum Moderner Orient.
