= Mass media in Iraq =

The mass media in Iraq includes print, radio, television, and online services. Iraq became the first Arab country to broadcast from a TV station, in 1954. As of 2020, more than 100 radio stations and 150 television stations were broadcasting to Iraq in Arabic, English, Kurdish, Turkmen, and Neo-Aramaic.

== Iraqi media under Saddam Hussein ==
Media under Saddam Hussain's Ba'ath party was severely limited and strictly controlled by the state. There was one news network called Iraqi News Agency which functioned solely as a mouthpiece for the regime. Any media other than that under the purview of the government was barred. Satellite dishes were illegal. Although this may have been circumvented by some of Baghdad's elite, the fear of being turned in or found out made this an uncommon occurrence.

The Ministry of Information was charged with control of the media during Saddam's rule. At this time, there were only five state-owned daily newspapers, one government TV channel, and four radio stations. Legislation was in place to assist in the control of the media by the state, and digressions were not tolerated. Expression was widely restricted, and there were no laws to protect journalists or media professionals.

== Media under U.S. invasion and its aftermath ==
After the end of full state control in 2003, a period of considerable growth occurred in Iraq's broadcast media. Immediately, the ban on satellite dishes was no longer in place, and by mid-2003, according to a BBC report, there were 20 radio stations, 15-17 Iraqi-owned television stations, and 200 Iraqi-owned and operated newspapers. Significantly, many of these newspapers emerged in disproportionate numbers to the population of their locations. For example, in Najaf, with a population of 300,000, over 30 newspapers were being published and distributed.

Iraqi media expert and author of a number of reports on the subject, Ibrahim al-Marashi, outlines four phases of the US invasion in 2003 in which steps were taken that had significant effects on the subsequent path of Iraqi media since. The stages are: pre-invasion preparation, actual war and selection of targets, initial post-war period, and the increased insurgency and handover to the Interim Iraqi Government (IIG) and Prime Minister Ayad Allawi.

The pre-war planning failed to effectively outline a post-war strategy for a number of reasons, namely a lack of expertise, funding, authority, and involvement of civilian aid organizations. During the war, the importance of leaving structures in place for post-war reconstruction was ultimately unheeded. Many of domestic transmitters were destroyed. After the war, the process of de-Ba'athification involved abolishing the Ministry of Information and too much reliance on US personnel and expat Iraqis who had little connection to those in Iraq at the time and did not place sufficient emphasis on building local capacity. In addition, the widespread looting and destruction that took place immediately after the war did not exclude media infrastructure.

Under the direction of Ambassador L. Paul Bremer III as the Administrator, the Coalition Provisional Authority (CPA) began issuing radio and television licenses in June 2003 to meet the great demand for broadcasting licenses. The licenses were issued by the CPA Senior Adviser for Telecommunications. To plan for the expected great demand, this CPA office worked with Iraqi radio-frequency spectrum engineers and managers to develop a national FM-radio and TV channel allotment plan for all of the major Iraqi cities and towns. The national plan was developed using technical criteria and the Region 1 (Europe, Africa and the Middle East) allotment plan that was developed years before by the International Telecommunication Union (ITU), a United Nations treaty organization. The Iraqi allotment plan consisted of hundreds of FM radio and TV stations allotted to the cities and towns. The channels in the allotment plan were then open to anyone to apply for a license for a particular channel.

The CPA developed a few basic rules and regulations in June and July 2003 to provide a limited regulatory control of the broadcasters. For example, broadcasts inciting riots were prohibited. The overall CPA objective was to issue many licenses to provide for a plethora of diverse voices, information, music, and news to satisfy the desires and tastes of the Iraqi citizens. The CPA also recognized that broadcasting was a combination of business, advertising, journalism, engineering, and entertainment, and a robust and thriving broadcasting industry could provide a large number of excellent and highly desirable professional jobs that would reduce national unemployment. The CPA also recognized that commercial broadcasting could provide wealth-building opportunities to successful broadcasters.

The Iraqi Media Network (IMN0), a public broadcasting network similar to the Public Broadcasting System in the United States, was issued radio and TV licenses by the CPA.

The CPA continued its work as the national broadcasting licensing and regulatory authority until June 2004 when the Iraq Communications and Media Commission (CMC) was established as the national regulatory agency that would issue licenses and regulate broadcasting and telecommunications.

== Iraqi media landscape today ==
The Iraqi News Agency, which operated as a mouthpiece of the government under the regime of Saddam Hussein continued to operate post 2003, but it was challenged by the independent news agency Aswat al-Iraq, which is backed by the United Nations; major foreign news agencies with offices in Iraq are the Anadolu Ajansı of Turkey, the Associated Press of the United States, the Deutsche Presse-Agentur of Germany, the Informatsionnoye Telegrafnoye Agenstvo Rossii–Telegrafnoye Agenstvo Suverennykh Stran (ITAR-TASS) of the Russian Federation, Reuters of Britain, and Xinhua News Agency of the People's Republic of China.

The United States spent hundreds of millions of dollars on strategic communication in Iraq, and is believed responsible for such anonymously written newspapers as Baghdad Now and a variety of posters, billboard messages and radio and television spots. However, Iraqis have largely dismissed such media as obvious propaganda and some note that they are as clumsily written as that used under President Hussein.

Online media has become a significant source of news in Iraq as print newspaper consumption has decreased dramatically. The online news outlets with the most prominent online presence are Iraqi News, AK News, a Kurdish source published in English and Arabic as well, Al Sumaria, Baghdadia, Al Iraq News, Iraq Hurr (US-funded), and Dar adDustour. As a general rule, online sources publish mainly political news. Any news pertaining to the activities of government officials is prioritized; rarely does any other type of headline appear front-and-center. Economy and oil-related news comes in a clear second place, often announcing whenever contracts are signed and with which companies to develop which oil fields. Other prominent areas of coverage in Iraq's online news outlets are security events, the activities of the US that concern Iraq, parliamentary proceedings and the stalling legislative process, and to a lesser extent, media and education issues. The area that gets the least coverage while deserving more by far is that of Iraq's youth. Considering three factors, the recent revolutions in the region, ongoing protests in Iraq, and the large percentage of the Iraqi population that is under the age of 35, youth issues should be given a high level of attention in Iraq's press. However, they rarely make the news, with the exception of through the sports section which offers details on the Iraqi national soccer team.

Aside from traditional media, there exists a new form of journalism in Iraq – citizen journalism. Blogging has become a major source of information for people in Iraq and around the world on popular opinion. Since 2003, the Iraqi blogosphere grew to include many people who either previously had no background in journalism or means to make their voices heard. One prominent Iraqi blogger is a dentist who lives in London, for example, and runs his own personal blog as well as a forum for English-speaking Iraqis. Iraq has had a long history of outward migration of its citizens for both political and economic reasons, beginning most heavily in the 1940s. So, engaging the Iraqi exile and refugee community in dialogues about developments on the ground in Iraq brings back in a large portion of the Iraqi citizenry that has previously been unable to join in the debates. Youth in particular are participating in this mechanism for communication, feeling that they finally have a way to project their opinions. Voices that had been silenced are now being heard and are providing a service in an environment where traditional media is falling short of delivering sufficient information about events and sentiments on the ground. During the 2005 referendum on the Iraqi Constitution, bloggers were instrumental in conveying the opinions and recommendations of Iraqis.

It is important to keep in mind that Iraqi bloggers are predominantly male and under the age of 35. However, while it is inaccurate to assume that bloggers evenly represent the Iraqi public, over half of the Iraqi population is under the age of 35.

== Newspapers ==
The daily papers with the largest circulation, all published in Baghdad, are al Mada, al Sabah, and al Zaman (also published in London).

- Al Mutamar is the official organ of the Iraqi National Congress
- Al Mada is a well-respected independent daily.
- Iraqi News
- Baghdad Now
- Rozhnama (Iraqi Kurdistan)
- Al Hawza
- Al Mustaqilla (Baghdad)
- Hatha al-Youm (Baghdad)
- Al Mutamar
- Babel
- The Hewler Globe (Erbil)
- Azzaman
- Al-Sabah Al-Jadid
- Al-Mashriq
- Al Anbaa (Fallujah)
- Bashira (Fallujah), out of print.
- Iraq World (Baghdad)
- Kitabat
- Karbala News (Karbala)
- Sotal Iraq
- Destur
- Lvin Magazine (Iraqi Kurdistan)
- Hawlati (Iraqi Kurdistan)
- Awene (Iraqi Kurdistan)
- Hawler
- Renwen (Iraqi Kurdistan/Xaneqin)
- Xebat (Kurdistan)
- Shock Magazine (Kurdistan)
- Mangish (Iraqi Kurdistan)
- Seo (Iraqi - Baghdad)

== Radio ==
The first radio station in Iraq was Radio Baghdad (also known as Republic of Iraq Radio), started on 1 July 1936.

Since the fall of the Saddam Hussein regime, there has been a proliferation of radio broadcasters in Iraq. This is particularly evident in the north, especially in Iraqi Kurdistan and Baghdad. There are fewer stations in the south in places such as Basrah. Radio stations appear and disappear regularly, so any list such as below should not be considered definitive.

The stations in Iraq are as follows:

=== AM radio ===
- Radio Annas (Al-Nass) – Baghdad
- Al-Bilad – Baghdad
- Voice of Iraq – Voice of Iraq – Baghdad
- Al Rashid Radio – Al Rashid Radio

=== FM radio ===
- Al Aan FM – Al Aan FM is available in the following cities and frequencies: Mosul & Duhok 92.7 MHz, Kirkuk 97.3 MHz, Hawija 97.3 MHz
- Radio Al Mirbad – Arabic station in Basra with relays in southern cities
- Monte Carlo Doualiya – Monte Carlo Doualiya – Baghdad news/info French
- Radio Dijla – Radio Dijla – Baghdad
- BBC Arabic Service – BBC Arabic Service – International news/info English/Arabic in many areas of Iraq
- Radio Nawa – Radio Nawa Kurdish, Arabic and Music – Sulaymaniyah plus many relays throughout Iraq.
- Dar Al Salam – Dar Al Salam – Baghdad talk
- Al Huda Radio – Al Huda Radio – Baghdad
- Al-Rasheed – Al-Rasheed|rep – Baghdad
- Babylon FM – Ankawa, Erbil
- BBC World Service – BBC World Service – Baghdad news/info English/Arabic
- Al-Hurriya FM – Al-Hurriya FM – Baghdad news
- Ur FM – Ur FM – Baghdad pop (Arabic)
- Radio Al-Salam (Iraqi Kurdistan)
- Sumer FM – Sumer FM – Baghdad
- Radio Sawa – Baghdad
- Shafaq – Shafaq – Baghdad
- Freedom Radio (AFN Iraq) – Freedom Radio (AFN Iraq) – Baghdad
- BFBS Radio 1 (Middle East) – BFBS Radio 1 (Middle East) – Baghdad news/music English
- Public Opinion News Agency – PONA News (RP News) – Baghdad
- Speda FM - Kurdish station in Iraqi Kurdistan Region, 106.3 MHz.

=== Former stations ===
- Radio Free Iraq (Baghdad / Prague, Czech Republic)

== Television ==
The most popular television stations were the independent Al Sharqiya, Al Baghdadia TV and state-owned Al Iraqiya.

- Al Iraqiya (Arabic: العراقيّة al-ʿIrāqiyyä) is a terrestrial television network in Iraq that was set up after the fall of Sadaam Hussein.
- Ishtar TV (Syriac:ܥܫܬܪ, is an Assyrian broadcasting channel which has its headquarters in Erbil, Iraq. The network broadcasts mostly in Assyrian (Ashuri), but Arabic and Kurdish are heard as well.
- KNN is a news opposition Kurdish channel based in Kurdistan, Sulaimani. It represents the Gorran movement, and targets the Kurdistan region.
- Kanal4 is an entertainment television channel, targeting Kurdish people living in North Iraq and surrounding areas.
- Al-Zawraa TV was an anti-American TV network. The station appeared to close down in July 2007 after its transmissions via the Arabsat satellite were jammed.
- Al Sharqiya, Iraq's first privately owned satellite TV station
- Al Sumaria, an independent Iraqi satellite TV network
- Nawa TV, an Iraqi TV station broadcasting in Arabic and Kurdish
- Al Forat, the SIIC TV station from Baghdad
- Ashur TV is affiliated with the Assyrian Democratic Movement.
- Biladi TV
- Baghdad TV
- Afaq TV, channel of Nouri al-Maliki
- Al Rasheed TV, close to Mohamed Al-Halbousi and his Taqadum party
- Ahlulbayt TV
- Al Masar
- Al Fayha
- New line Television
- Asia Network Television
- Karbala TV
- Alahad TV, close to Popular Mobilization Forces
- Aletejah TV
- Speda TV, is an Iraqi Kurdish channel which has its headquarters in Erbil, Iraq, affiliated to the Kurdistan Islamic Union Party.

Arabic-language satellite broadcasts from neighboring countries were increasingly popular:

- Al-Baghdadia TV is an independent Iraqi-owned Arabic-language satellite channel based in Cairo, Egypt. Recently, the station became best known for journalist Muntadhar al-Zaidi, who threw his shoes at U.S. President George W. Bush.

== See also ==
- Telecommunications in Iraq
