= List of newspapers in Iraq =

The first newspaper in Iraq was Journal Iraq published by Ottoman Wali, Dawud Pasha, in Baghdad in 1816.

This is a list of newspapers in Iraq.

== A–G ==
- Al Anbaa (Fallujah)
- Al Hawza (defunct)
- Al-Mada
- Al-Mashriq
- Al-Mustaqilla (Baghdad; defunct)
- Al-Mutamar
- Al-Sabaah
- Awena (Iraqi Kurdistan)
- Azzaman
- Babel
- Bahra
- Ath-Thawra (Ba'athist Iraq;Disbanded after 2003)

== H–Z ==
- Hawlati (Iraqi Kurdistan)
- Iraq Today (English)
- Iraq World (Baghdad)
- Iraqi News
- Karbala News (Karbala)
- Ktabat
- The Kurdish Globe
- Renwen (Khanaqin, Iraqi Kurdistan)
- Rozhnama (Iraqi Kurdistan)
- SOMA Digest (English)
- Sot al-Iraq
- Xebat (Kurdistan)
