= Hatha al-Youm =

News aggregator service for Iraqi affairs

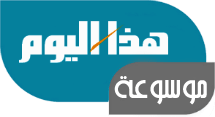
- Website type: News Aggregator
- Headquarters: Baghdad, Iraq
- Owner: Hatha al-Youm Publishing Ltd.
- Revenue: Subscription and Advertising
- Website: hathalyoum.net
- Registration: no registration
- Launched: 2011

Hatha al-Youm meaning "This day" in Arabic: هذا اليوم, is news aggregator service for Iraqi affairs in three languages arabic, Kurdish, and English. It was launched in 2011 with five main sources. Over the years, this service has been published to about 6,000 sources, including official Iraqi websites, according to local media of Iraq.

== Interface ==
Hatha al-Youm uses the RSS, search box function, and employs techniques where users can find news using keywords.

== Sources ==
Most reports from Iraqi news websites sites is aggregated on this site. Additionally, many sites rely on Hatha al-Youm for news source, especially during the Syrian civil war. Aside from aggregating news articles, the site publishes reports it receives via e-mail.

== Ranking ==
Hatha al-Youm is one of the most visited sites in Iraq, especially during international military intervention against ISIL in 2014. Over one million users visit the per month and the website receives more than 50 million views monthly. Hatha al-Youm has about two million pages indexed with the Google search engine.

=== Advertisement ===
Hatha al-Youm earns revenue from advertising with ads displayed on all the site's web pages. Hatha al-Youm received its last payment for hosting an election announcement by late Iraqi National Congress leader Ahmad Chalabi before the 2014 Iraqi parliamentary election. Hatha al-Youm's second source of income comes from advertising services that provide access to a third-party site like adSense and other text advertising companies or through polls.

== Controversy ==
Some website owners believe that Hatha al-Youm sometimes manipulates their news on the site by changing titles, vocabulary, or deleting some news, at the request of influential political parties, especially in Baghdad. Some sites have decided to cancel their service with Hatha al-Youm, and many of them claim the site would not have been successful had they not participated indirectly.

== See also ==
- Sada News Agency
- Iraqi News
- Al Iraqiya
- List of Arabic-language television channels
- Media of Iraq
- State media
