= List of countries and territories where Arabic is an official language =

Nations in which Arabic is an official language (de facto or de jure). Official as majority language (>50%) Co-official as majority language (>50%) Co-official as minority language (<50%) Not official as minority language (<50%)

Arabic is a language cluster comprising 30 or so modern varieties. Its various dialects are spoken by around 422 million speakers (native and non-native) in the Arab world, as well as in the Arab diaspora. The number of speakers makes it one of the five most spoken languages in the world.

Arabic is the lingua franca of people who live in countries of the Arab world as well as of Arabs who live in the diaspora, particularly in Latin America (especially Brazil, Argentina, Venezuela, Chile and Colombia) or Western Europe (like France, Spain, Germany or Italy).

Cypriot Arabic is a recognized minority language in the EU member state of Cyprus and, along with Maltese, is one of only two extant European varieties of Arabic, though it has its own standard literary form and has no diglossic relationship with Standard Arabic. Maltese is one of the official languages of the EU.

== Official language ==
As of 2026, there are 23 sovereign states where Modern Standard Arabic is an official language.

Sovereign states where Arabic is an official language
Sovereign state	Population	Notes	Member of the Arab League
Algeria	41,701,000	Co-official with Amazight	Yes
Bahrain	1,343,000	Official language	Yes
Chad	10,329,208	Co-official with French	Observer
Comoros	798,000	Co-official with Comorian and French	Yes
Djibouti	810,179	Co-official with French	Yes
Egypt	102,442,939	Official language	Yes
Iraq	46,118,793	Co-official with Kurdish	Yes
Jordan	6,655,000	Official language	Yes
Kuwait	2,789,000	Official language	Yes
Lebanon	4,965,914	Official language	Yes
Libya	6,244,174	Official language	Yes
Mali	21,359,722	Co-official with 12 other languages	No
Mauritania	3,359,185	Official language	Yes
Morocco	35,250,000	Co-official language, along with Amazight	Yes
Oman	4,055,418	Official language	Yes
Qatar	2,155,446	Official language	Yes
Saudi Arabia	30,770,375	Official language	Yes
Somalia	10,428,043	Co-official with Somali	Yes
Sudan	40,235,000	Co-official with English	Yes
Syria	20,956,000	Official language	Yes
Tunisia	10,982,754	Official language	Yes
United Arab Emirates	9,346,129	Official language	Yes
Yemen	23,833,000	Official language	Yes

== States with limited recognition and territories where Arabic is an official language ==
States/territories where Arabic is an official language
State/Territory	Population	Notes
Somaliland	5,700,000	Co-official with Somali and English
Zanzibar	1,303,569	Co-official with Swahili and English
Sahrawi Arab Democratic Republic	502,585	Co-official with Spanish

== National language or recognized minority language ==
As of 2016, there are 5 independent countries where Arabic is a national, working language or a recognized minority language, but not the primary language.

Countries where Arabic is a national/working languageor a recognized minority language
Country	Population	Status
Cyprus	875,900	Minority language
Eritrea	6,380,803	Working language
Iran	83,145,546	Minority language
Niger	22,314,743	National language
Senegal	16,209,125	National language

=== Cyprus ===
Cypriot Arabic (alongside Armenian) is one of the two recognized minority languages of Cyprus, since 2008. It is spoken by the Maronite community, which is a minority in Cyprus especially in the cities Nicosia, Limassol and Larnaca.

Cypriot Arabic (also known as Cypriot Maronite Arabic) is taught at the Elementary School of St. Maron, which is located in Anthoupolis southern of Nicosia, Cyprus.

=== Eritrea ===
Debate exists over the extent of Arabic in Eritrea; the government position is that the language was introduced by the British and is only in use by a professional elite and the Rashaida minority, whereas others have taken the view the language acts as the lingua franca of the country's Muslims. Eritrea is an observer state in the Arab League.

=== Iran ===
Arabic is a recognized minority language of Iran. In addition, the constitution recognizes the Arabic language as the language of Islam, giving it a formal status as the language of religion, and regulates its spreading within the Iranian national curriculum. After the Islamic Revolution in 1979, Arabic (as the language of Quran) became mandatory for pupils in Iran. Arabic courses are mandatory starting from 6th year of schooling (1st year of Middle School) until the 11th year (penultimate year of High School).

The local dialects of Arabic spoken by Arab minorities in Iran (like Ahwazi Arabs, Khamseh Arabs, Marsh Arabs as well as Arabs in Khorasan) are Khuzestani Arabic and Mesopotamian Arabic, (also known as Iraqi Arabic) mainly in Khuzestan Province as well as Khorasani Arabic especially in Khorasan Province.

There are several TV channels in Arabic language broadcasting from Iran, namely, Al-Alam, Al-Kawthar TV, iFilm, Ahwazna TV, Al Ahwaz TV and Al-Ahvaz TV. Currently, the sole newspaper in Arabic language published in Iran is Kayhan Al Arabi out of 23 Persian dailies and three English dailies newspapers in Iran.

In 2008, the public university Payame Noor University declared that Arabic will be the "second language" of the university, and that all its services will be offered in Arabic, concurrent with Persian.

=== Niger ===
Arabic is one of the recognized national languages in Niger. Arabic is spoken by a minority in Niger especially by the Diffa Arabs (also known as Mahamid Arabs) an Arab nomadic tribespeople who is living in eastern Niger, mostly in the Diffa Region.

=== Senegal ===
Arabic is one of the recognized national languages in Senegal. Hassaniya Arabic is spoken by a minority in Senegal.

== Special status according to the constitution ==
As of 2018, there are 5 independent countries where Arabic has a special status according to the constitution.

Countries where Arabic has a special status according to the constitution
Country	Population	Official language(s)	Other recognized language(s)
Iran	83,145,546	Persian	Arabic
Israel	9,149,960	Hebrew	Arabic
Pakistan	218,396,000	Urdu and English	Arabic
Philippines	100,981,437	Filipino and English	"Regional Languages", Spanish, Arabic
South Africa	60,142,978	English, isiZulu, isiXhosa, Afrikaans, Sepedi, Setswana, South African Sign Language, Sesotho, Xitsonga, siSwati (Swazi), Tshivenda, isiNdebele	Khoi, Nama, San, German, Greek, Gujarati, Hindi, Portuguese, Tamil, Telegu, Urdu, Hebrew, Sanskrit, Arabic

=== Iran ===
The constitution of the Islamic Republic of Iran recognizes the Arabic language as the language of Islam, giving it a formal status as the language of religion, and regulates its spreading within the Iranian national curriculum. The constitution declares in Chapter II: (The Official Language, Script, Calendar, and Flag of the Country) in Article 16 "Since the language of the Qur`an and Islamic texts and teachings is Arabic, ..., it must be taught after elementary level, in all classes of secondary school and in all areas of study."

=== Israel ===
Arabic was an official language of Mandatory Palestine and was retained as an official language when the State of Israel was founded in 1948. In 2018, the Knesset upgraded the status of Hebrew from official to State language of Israel, and gave Arabic a special status in the State by adopting the relevant Basic Law. The Basic Law: Israel as the Nation-State of the Jewish People (an Israeli Basic Law which specifies the nature of the State of Israel as the nation-state of the Jewish People) states in No. 4 (B) that "The Arabic language has a special status in the state; Regulating the use of Arabic in state institutions or by them will be set in law." The law declares in No. 4 (C): "This clause does not harm the status given to the Arabic language before this law came into effect." The law was adopted by the Knesset 62 in favor, 55 against and two abstentions on 19 July 2018.

Arabic is an indigenous language in the territory which form the State of Israel and which is still the lingua franca of Arab citizens of Israel as well as of Arab foreigners (especially Palestinians who have only a Palestinian passport, not recognized by many countries. Thus, they consider Palestinians stateless). In addition, Arabic is spoken by Jews in Israel who immigrated from Arab countries to Israel (as Aliyah) and got the Israeli citizenship according to the Israeli Nationality Law of 1952.

Arabic names are shown on some seals of Arabic majority cities.

It is semi-official and used in ethnically mixed cities including Jerusalem, Haifa, and Tel Aviv-Yafo, as well as on most highway signage, official websites, and public buildings in areas with significant Arabic-speaking populations.

=== Pakistan ===
According to the Constitution of Pakistan of 1956 the two languages Urdu, as well as Bengali (at that time the lingua franca in the territory which is today the independent state Bangladesh) became the national languages in the new founded state Islamic Republic of Pakistan. General Ayub Khan the second President of Pakistan advocated the institution of Arabic language teaching as part of national planning. "Ayub`s educational plan emphasized Urdu and English as the primary language of Pakistan, but additionally recommended that Arabic be a secondary language of instruction along with English." This recommendation was purely for religious reasons, as Pakistan is not an Arab country.

The Arabic language is mentioned in the constitution of Pakistan. It declares in article 31 No. 2 that "The State shall endeavour, as respects the Muslims of Pakistan (a) to make the teaching of the Holy Quran and Islamiat compulsory, to encourage and facilitate the learning of Arabic language ..."

The National Education Policy 2017 declares in article 3.7.4 that: “Arabic as compulsory part will be integrated in Islamiyat from Middle to Higher Secondary level to enable the students to understand the Holy Quran.“ Furthermore, it specifies in article 3.7.6: “Arabic as elective subject shall be offered properly at Secondary and Higher Secondary level with Arabic literature and grammar in its course to enable the learners to have command in the language.“ This law is also valid for private schools as it defines in article 3.7.12: “The curriculum in Islamiyat, Arabic and Moral Education of public sector will be adopted by the private institutions to make uniformity in the society.“

In 2021, Pakistan's upper house of parliament approved the ‘Compulsory Teaching of the Arabic Language Bill 2020’ which makes the teaching of Arabic mandatory at all primary and secondary schools in the capital, Islamabad. The text of the bill says that Arabic should be taught from the first to the fifth grade and Arabic grammar should be taught from the sixth grade to the eleventh grade. The main reasons given are that Arabic would open up more job opportunities for Pakistanis in the Middle East and lead to lower unemployment and increased remittances and that Arabic is the language of the Quran, so making Arabic compulsory in school will help improve the understanding of it.

=== Philippines ===
The Arabic language is mentioned in the Philippine constitution of 1986. It specifies that "Spanish and Arabic shall be promoted on a voluntary and optional basis."

Arabic is mainly used by some Filipino Muslims in both a liturgical and instructional capacity since the arrival of Islam and establishment of several Sultanates (like Sultanate of Maguindanao, Sultanate of Sulu and Sultanate of Ranaw) and during Bruneian Empire in the present-day state Philippines. Along with Malay, Arabic was the lingua franca of the Malay Archipelago among Muslim traders and the Malay aristocracy in the Philippines' history. Arabic is taught for free and is promoted in some Islamic centres predominantly in the southernmost parts of Philippines.

=== South Africa ===
The Arabic language is mentioned in the Constitution of South Africa. It declares in Chapter 1 (Founding Provisions) Section 6, Languages that "A Pan South African Language Board established by national legislation must (b) promote and ensure respect for – (i) all languages commonly used by communities in South Africa, including ...; and (ii) Arabic, ... for religious purposes in South Africa."

== Non-sovereign entities and territories ==
Non-sovereign entities and territories where Arabic is an official or de facto official language
Non-sovereign entity/territory	Population	Notes
Galmudug	1,230,000	Co-official language, along with Somali
Hirshabelle	1,800,000	Co-official with Somali
Iraqi Kurdistan	5,300,000	Co-official with Kurdish
Jubaland	1,000,000	Co-official with Somali
Khatumo	2,000,000	Co-official with Somali
Puntland	1,285,000	Co-official with Somali
South West State of Somalia	2,000,000	Co-official with Somali
Total	28,835,000	NA

== History ==
=== Umayyad Caliphate ===
The expansion of the first Caliphates: Expansion under Islamic prophet Muhammad, 622–632 AD/ 1–11 AH Expansion during the Rashidun Caliphate, 632–661 AD/ 11–40 AH Expansion during the Umayyad Caliphate, 661–750 AD/ 40–129 AH

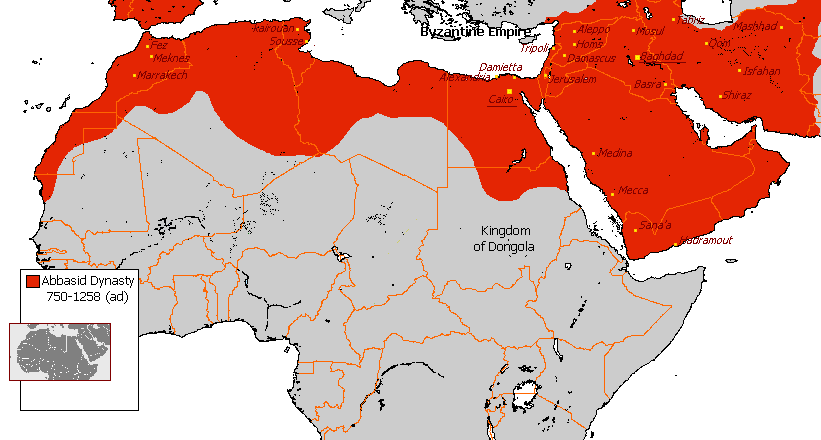
Expansion of the Abbasid caliphate, 750–1258 AD/ 132–923 AH

The Muslim conquests (Arabic: الفتوحات الإسلامية, al-Futūḥāt al-Islāmiyya) and the following Expansion of Islam (Arabic: انتشار الإسلام, Intishar al-Islām) led to the expansion of the Arabic language in Northern Africa, the Iberian Peninsula, the Caucasus, Western Asia, Central Asia and South Asia. Along with the religion of Islam, the Arabic language, Arabic number system and Arab customs spread throughout the entire Arab caliphate. The caliphs of the Arab dynasty established the first schools inside the empire which taught Arabic language and Islamic studies for all pupils in all areas within the caliphate. The result was (in those areas which belonged to the Arab empire) the creation of the society that was mostly Arabic-speaking because of the assimilation of native inhabitants.

During the period of the Umayyad Caliphate (661–750), the 5th Umayyad caliph Abd al-Malik (646–705) established Arabic instead of the local languages as the sole official state language of government across the entire caliphate.

=== Abbasid Caliphate ===
While the Abbasid Caliphate (750–1258) originally gained power by exploiting the social inequalities against non-Arabs in the Umayyad Empire, during Abbasid rule the empire rapidly was Arabized. As knowledge was shared in the Arabic language throughout the empire, people of different nationalities and religions began gradually to speak Arabic in their everyday lives. Resources from other languages began to be translated into Arabic, and a unique Islamic identity began to form that fused previous cultures with Arab culture, creating a level of civilization and knowledge that was considered a marvel in Europe and the Western world.

=== Fatimid Caliphate ===
The Arabic language remained the lingua franca of high culture under the Fatimids (909–1171), Spanish Umayyads (856–1031) in the Iberian Peninsula, and later Muslim dynasties in North Africa and Spain and of the Mamluks (1250–1517) in Egypt and Syria-Palestine.

=== Al-Andalus ===
In the history, Andalusian Arabic was the official language in Spain and Portugal, formerly Al-Andalus for more than 700 years until the fall of the last Islamic state in Iberia at Granada in 1492.

=== Italy and Malta ===
Siculo-Arabic (or Sicilian Arabic) was a spoken language on the islands of Sicily and neighbouring Malta (at that time Emirate of Sicily (831–1091)) between the end of the ninth century and the end of the twelfth century.

=== Greece ===
A form of Arabic was spoken on the Mediterranean island of Crete (Emirate of Crete) from the late 820s (c. 824 or 827/828) until the Byzantine reconquest in 961.

=== Omani Empire ===
Arabic was the official language of the Omani Empire (1696–1856). Several Arabic dialects and languages were the lingua francas in the different areas of this empire, like Omani Arabic, Yemeni Arabic, Persian, Balochi and Swahili.

=== South Sudan ===
Arabic (alongside English) was an official language in South Sudan from 1863 (then a part of Egypt Eyalet (1517–1867)) until 2011 (that time the independent state Republic of South Sudan), when the former government canceled Arabic as an official language. Since 2011 English is the sole official language of South Sudan. The Arabic dialect Juba Arabic is still the lingua franca of the people in South Sudan.

=== The Gambia ===
In 2014, Gambian president Yahya Jammeh announced that The Gambia would drop English as the official language because it is a "colonial relic". He replaced Gambia's official language English with Arabic in 2014. However, such change was not enacted.

=== Israel ===
The Arabic language (alongside Hebrew) also remained as an official language in the State of Israel for the first 70 years after the proclamation in 1948 until 2018. The Knesset canceled the status of Arabic as an official language by adopting the relevant Basic Law: Israel as the Nation-State of the Jewish People on 19 July 2018. This Israeli Basic Law states in No. 4 (A) that "The state’s language is Hebrew."

== See also ==
- Arab League
- Arab world
- Arabic-based creole languages
- Dialect continuum
- List of lingua francas
- Geolinguistics
- Language geography

By ISO 639-3 code
Enter an ISO code to find the corresponding language article.
