= List of newspapers in Algeria =

Below is a list of newspapers in Algeria.

== Arabic language ==
- Ech-Chaab الشعب
- Echorouk - الشروق
- El Ayem El Djazairia - الأيام الجزائرية
- El Hayat - الحياة
- El Khabar - الخبر
- El Massa - المساء
- Ennahar - النهار

== French language ==
- Algérie Actualité
- L'Algérie Libre
- Alger Républicain
- El Acil
- El Moudjahid
- El Watan
- La Cité
- L'Expression
- Le Matin
- Le Quotidien d'Oran
- Le Soir d'Algérie
- Liberté (Algeria)

== English language ==
- The Algiers Herald (online only)
- Algerian Gazette (online only)

== See also ==
- Media of Algeria
- List of radio stations in Africa: Algeria
- Television in Algeria
- Internet in Algeria

== Bibliography ==
- William A. Rugh (2004). ""Transitional" System of Print Media: Egypt, Jordan, Tunisia, and Algeria". Arab Mass Media: Newspapers, Radio, and Television in Arab Politics. Praeger Publishers. ISBN 978-0-275-98212-6.
