= List of newspapers in Oman =

This is a list of newspapers in Oman.

- Al-Roya - Arabic
- Al-Shabiba - Arabic
- Alwatan - Arabic
- Oman Daily - Arabic
- Oman Daily Observer - English and Arabic
- Muscat Daily - English
- Times of Oman - English
- The Arabian Stories - English and Arabic

== Out of print ==
- Azamn - Arabic
- Oman Tribune - English
- TheWeek - published Wednesdays, English

== See also ==
- List of newspapers
