= List of Kurdish press =

The first Kurdish newspaper, titled Kurdistan, was published in Cairo in 1898. Since then, many different Kurdish newspapers, magazines, and journals have been published in the Ottoman Empire, Iraq, Armenia, Syria, Lebanon, and Iran, and in recent years in Turkey, Germany, Sweden, and France. The following is a list of well-known Kurdish newspapers and magazines in chronological order.

1. Kurdistan, newspaper, Cairo/Geneva, First issue 1898, 31 issues total.
2. Roja Kurd, monthly journal, Istanbul, 1912, 3 issues.
3. Pêşkewtin, newspaper, Sulaimania, 1920–1922, 118 issues.
4. Rojî Kurdistan, newspaper, Sulaimania, 1922–1923, 15 issues.
5. Bangê Kurdistan, weekly magazine, Sulaimania, 1922, 14 issues.
6. Bangê Heq, weekly magazine, Sulaimania, 1923, 3 issues.
7. Umîdî Istiqlal, weekly magazine, Sulaimnia, 1923, 25 issues.
8. Diyarî Kurdistan, monthly journal, Sulaimania, 1925–1926, 16 issues.
9. Jiyanewe, weekly magazine, Sulaimania, 1924–1926, 56 issues.
10. Jiyan, weekly magazine, Sulaimania, 1926–1938, 556 issues.
11. Zarî Kurmancî, bimonthly journal, Rawanduz, 1926–1932, 30 issues.
12. Riya Taze, biweekly magazine, Yerevan, 1930–1938, 612 issues (in Latin characters).
13. Hawar, monthly journal, Damascus, 1932–1935 and 1941–1943, 57 issues.
14. Ziban, weekly magazine, Sulaimania, 1937–1939, 70 issues.
15. Jîn, weekly magazine, Sulaimania, 1939–1963, more than 1,000 issues.
16. Gelawêj, monthly journal, Baghdad, 1939–1949.
17. Ronahî, bimonthly journal, Damascus, 1941–1945, 28 issues.
18. Roja Nû, weekly magazine, Beirut, 1943–1946, 73 issues.
19. Kurdistan, newspaper, Mahabad, 1945–1946, 113 issues.
20. Kurdistan, monthly literary review, Mahabad, 1945–1946, 16 issues.
21. Stêr, weekly magazine, Beirut, 1946, 3 issues.
22. Nizar, monthly journal, Baghdad, 1948–1949, 22 issues.
23. Hetaw, biweekly magazine, Erbil, 1954–1960, 188 issues.
24. Riya Taze, biweekly magazine, Yerevan, 1955–present, more than 2,500 issues (in Cyrillic and Latin characters).
25. Hîwa, bimonthly journal, Baghdad, 1957–1963, 36 issues.
26. Ray Gel, monthly journal, Kirkuk, 1959–1962, 34 issues.
27. Azadî, biweekly magazine, Kirkuk, 1959–1961, 56 issues.
28. Bilêse, monthly journal, Sulaimania, 1959–1960, 10 issues.
29. Xebat, newspaper, Baghdad, 1959–1961, 462 issues.
30. Kurdistan, weekly magazine, Tehran, 1959–1963, 205 issues (circulated only outside Iran).
31. Rojî Nwê, biweekly magazine, Sulaimania, 1960, 18 issues.
32. Birwa, weekly magazine, Sulaimania, 1960–1963, 95 issues.
33. Hewlêr, weekly magazine, Erbil, 1962–1963, 76 issues.
34. Dicle û Firat, monthly journal, Istanbul, 1962–1963, 8 issues.
35. Dengê Taze, monthly journal, Istanbul, 1966, 4 issues.
36. Birayetî, monthly journal, Baghdad, 1970–1971, 18 issues.
37. Birayetî, monthly journal, Sulaimania, 1971–1972, 18 issues.
38. Azadiya Welat
39. Hawlati, biweekly magazine, Sulaimania, 2000–present
40. Awena, weekly magazine, Sulaimania, 2006–present
41. The Kurdish Review, Monthly newspaper, Washington, D.C., 2011–present

== See also ==
- List of newspapers in Iraq
- List of newspapers in Syria
- List of newspapers in Turkey
- List of newspapers in Iran
