= Al Sabaah =

Newspaper of Iraq

Al-Sabaah الصباح
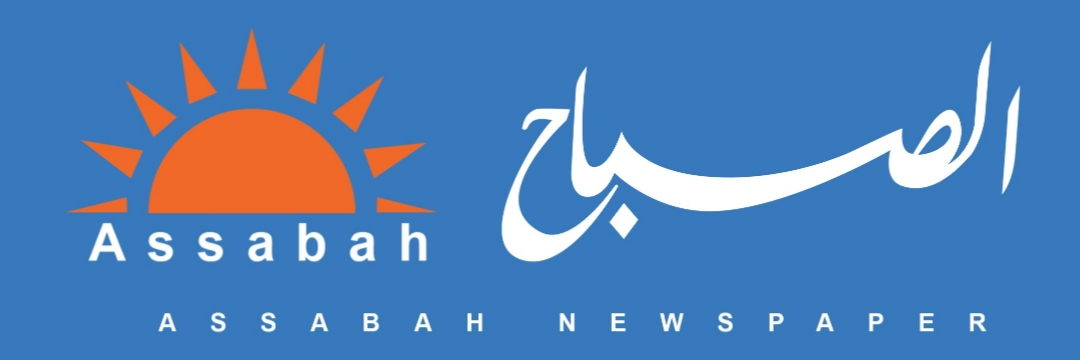
- Logo of Iraqi Newspaper "Alsabaah"
- Type: Daily newspaper
- Publisher: Iraqi Media Network
- Editor: Ahmed Abdel Hussein
- Founded: 17 May 2003
- Language: Arabic
- Headquarters: Baghdad, Iraq
- Website: Official website

Al-Sabaah (in Arabic الصباح meaning The Morning), an Iraqi state-owned daily newspaper published by the Iraqi Media Network, covers political, economic and artistic news through its pages. As well as through a set of weekly supplements. Its headquarters is located in Baghdad. The first issue was published in May 2003 after the fall of Saddam Hussein's regime and it is currently edited by Ahmed Abdel Hussein. It is available digitally on the newspaper's website and in print, and the price of the printed issue is 500 Iraqi dinars.

== See also ==
- List of newspapers in Iraq
- Media of Iraq
