= Terrorism in the Grip of Justice =

Terrorism in the Grip of Justice or Terrorism in the hands of Justice is a primetime television reality show that began broadcast by the Al Iraqiya network from right before the January 2005 national elections. It features footage of forced confessions of guilt from Iraqis captured by the Iraqi Army or U.S. Military.
