= Ennahar =

Ennahar may refer to:

- Ennahar newspaper, an Algerian daily newspaper
- Ennahar TV, an Arabic language satellite television channel

== See also ==
- Enahara dialect
