= Ahmad Hardi =

Iraqi Kurdish poet (1922–2006)

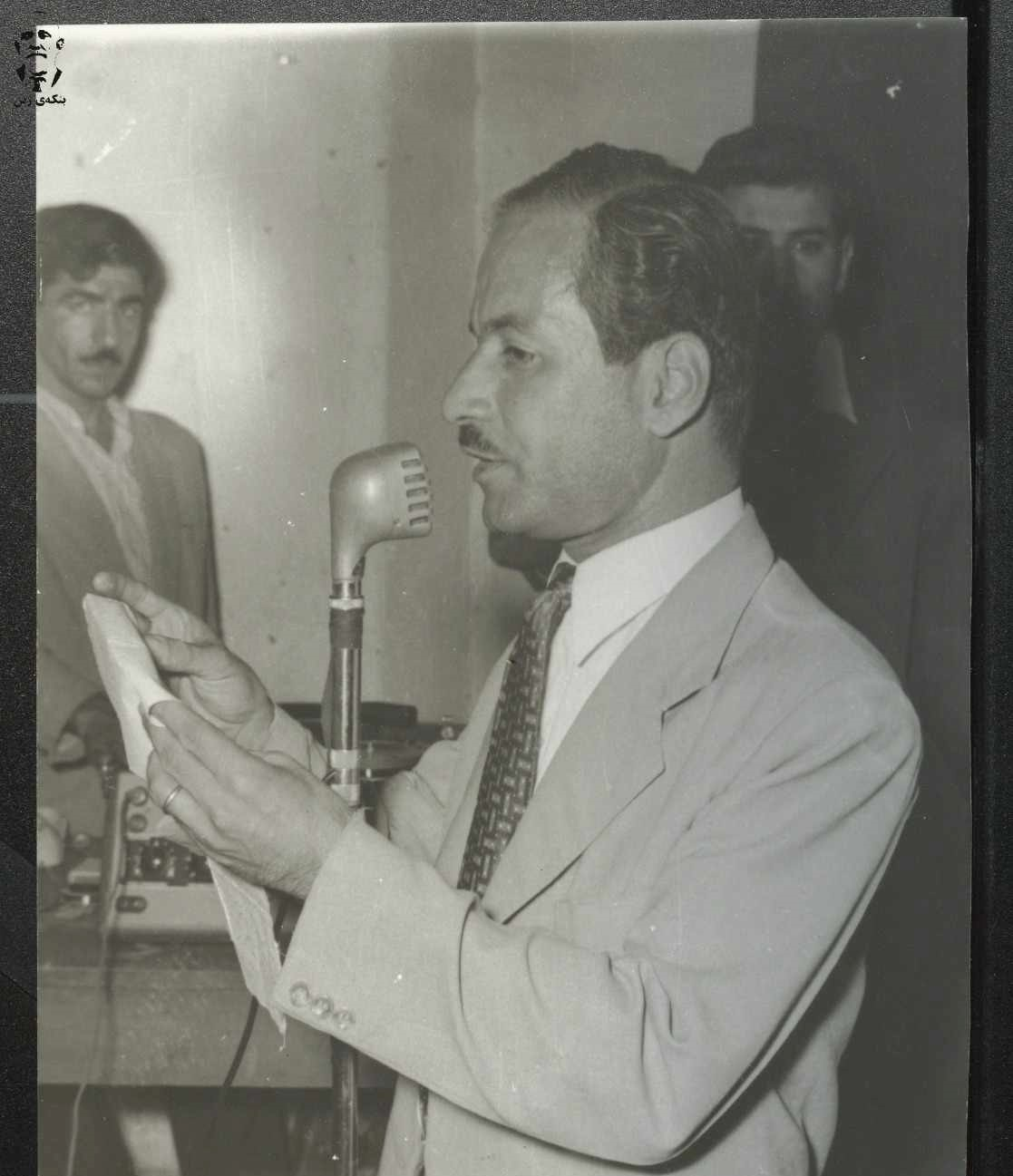
Ahmad Hardi in 1955

Ahmad Hardi (Kurdish: ئەحمەد ھەردی, romanized: Ehmed Herdî; 1922 – 29 October 2006) was a prominent Kurdish poet.

He was born into an intellectual family in Sulaimaniya in Iraqi Kurdistan. He possessed a deep knowledge of classical Kurdish, Arabic and Persian poetry and has had an enduring influence on the modern Kurdish poetry. He was a leading figure in the Kurdish liberation movement. After the Algiers Accord, he moved to Iran in 1975 and later to U.K. in 1993. His daughter Choman Hardi is a well known Kurdish poet, and his son Asos Hardi is a prominent journalist in Iraqi Kurdistan and founder of Hawlati and Awena independent newspapers. His first collection of poems was first published in 1957 and has been re-published several times since then.

== Books ==
- The Secret of Solitude, 1957

== See also ==
- Nalî
- Mahwi
- Piramerd
- Abdulla Goran
- Sherko Bekas
