= Al-Saada Stadium =

Multi-use stadium in Al-Saada district, Salalah, Oman

Al-Sa'ada Stadium/Al-Sa'ada Sports Complex
- استاد السعادة\مجمع السعادة الرياضي
- Interactive map of Al-Sa'ada Stadium/Al-Sa'ada Sports Complex
- Location: Al-Sa'ada, Salalah, Oman
- Coordinates: 17°04′57.76″N 54°08′37.64″E
- Owner: Government
- Operator: Ministry of Sports Affairs
- Capacity: 20,000
- Surface: Grass

Construction
- Groundbreaking: April 25, 2006
- Opened: July 23, 2009
- Renovated: (Under some renovation)

Tenants
- Dhofar; Al-Nasr

Al-Sa'ada Stadium (Arabic: أستاد السعادة), which is part of Al-Sa'ada Sports Complex (Arabic: مجمع السعادة الرياضي), is a government-owned multi-use stadium in the Al-Sa'ada district of Salalah, in southern Oman. The stadium is used only for football matches and is the home stadium of Salalah-based clubs Dhofar, and Al-Nasr. The stadium originally had an estimated capacity of 12,000 people, but with the 2010 renovation making the stadium an all-seater, the maximum capacity decreased to an estimated 8 to 9 thousand spectators. Although opened officially in 2009, the stadium has been undergoing renovation ever since, and because of protest from the football community in the city because of the unexpected outcome, the stadium has undergone a plan to eventually house close to 20,000 spectators.

Aside from the stadium itself, there is also a sports complex housed within the compound, which includes a field hockey pitch, a tennis court, an Olympic-size swimming pool, and an indoor volleyball/basketball stadium.

Unlike the Salalah Sports Complex located in the Auwqad district of Salalah, the Al-Saada Stadium features seating completely around the field, and does not include a running track, making the atmosphere more powerful and closer to the action.

== Controversy ==
The stadium has been subject to criticism, especially from influential people in Salalah. Omani newspaper, Al-Shabiba has published an article on February 1, 2010 منتديات كووورة about the stadium by writer, Mohammed Al-Rawas pointing out the main issues with the stadium. In it, it states that it has taken much longer than expected for it to finish, no seating whatsoever was installed, and the end result was just not what was expected. The article also mentions no installation of a parking lot.

Abdul-Hakim Ba-Mukhalaf, Ali Al-Ra'ood, Nayyif Al-Marhoon, and Dhofar S.C. president, Badr bin Ali Al-Rawas also join writer, Mohammed Al-Rawas in the long article criticizing the construction, planning, and disappointing end-result of the stadium.

According to Al-Shabiba's article from February 1, 2010, the stadium was planned to be completely finished in 15 months, but in fact, it has taken nearly 4 years and is still experiencing construction.

The leading football forum in the Arab World, Kooora.com has also been the place of criticism towards the stadium with various members opening threads explaining their disappointment in the outcome.

KooooraWaBas has also written an article about the stadium explaining the poor managing and planning of the stadium, lack of giving live feeds of matches, and no match clock installed.

== Tenants ==
Al-Saada Stadium is the new home to Dhofar FC as well as Al-Nasr FC, replacing their old home; the Salalah Sports Complex. The stadium also hosts various teams from Salalah in the second division, as well as Mirbat.

== Trivia ==
- The first international friendly between Saudi Arabia and Oman in Salalah was held in 2009 in this stadium.
- Location of this stadium is close to the ongoing construction of the new location of the Dhofar University.
- Many times the venue is confused with the Salalah Sports Complex when Dhofari clubs play home matches.

== Gallery ==
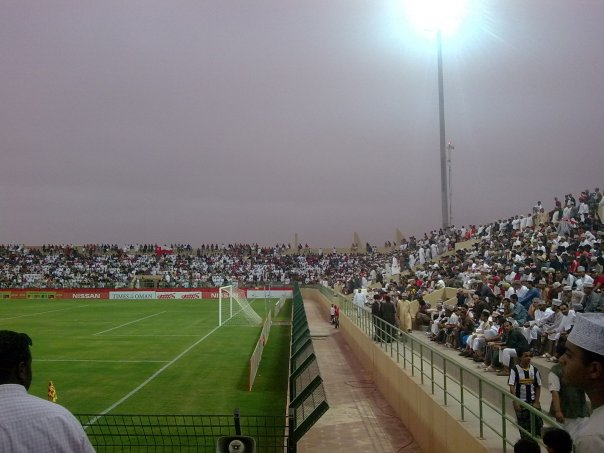
The stadium before the expansion during an international match between Oman and Saudi Arabia (12 August 2009)

== See also ==
- List of football stadiums in Oman
