= Yeni Özgür Politika =

Turkish and Kurdish-language daily newspaper

- Type: Daily newspaper
- Format: Tabloid
- Founded: January 16, 2006
- Language: Turkish, Kurdish
- Headquarters: Neu-Isenburg, Germany
- Circulation: ~30,000
- Website: ozgurpolitika.com

Yeni Özgür Politika (English: New Free Politics; YÖP) is a Turkish and Kurdish-language daily newspaper based in Neu-Isenburg, Germany. Founded on 16 January 2006, it continues the tradition of Kurdish journalism that originated in Turkey in the late 1980s. The newspaper is the successor of Özgür Politika, which was banned by German authorities in 2005.

Headquartered in Neu-Isenburg, Germany, Yeni Özgür Politika is the only newspaper publishing in both Turkish and Kurdish that maintains both print and online editions. The newspaper covers developments in Turkey and the Kurdistan region, and reflects the issues and activities of the Kurdish diaspora in Europe.

== History ==
=== Özgür Politika (1995–2005) ===
Özgür Politika was established in 1995 by E. Xani Presse und Verlags GmbH publishing house. The newspaper was printed in Neu-Isenburg near Frankfurt.

On 5 September 2005, the German Federal Ministry of the Interior banned the newspaper. The German Journalists' Union (DJU) criticized this decision as "completely disproportionate".

The ban was subsequently overturned by the Federal Administrative Court of Germany on legal grounds.

=== Yeni Özgür Politika (2006–present) ===
Following the lifting of the ban, the newspaper resumed publication on 16 January 2006 under the name "Yeni Özgür Politika". The newspaper is distributed across Europe alongside major publications such as Frankfurter Allgemeine Zeitung, Le Monde, Le Figaro, El País, and The Guardian.

According to the North Rhine-Westphalia intelligence service, the newspaper has a circulation of approximately 30,000 copies.

== Editorial policy and structure ==
The newspaper adheres to universal principles of journalism and professional ethics. Operating without financial support from any capital group or political organization, the newspaper sustains itself through daily sales and advertising, promotional, and sponsorship support from the Kurdish diaspora in Europe.

== PolitikArt ==
In addition to the daily newspaper, Yeni Özgür Politika publishes PolitikArt, a monthly arts and culture magazine in Turkish and Kurdish.

== Kurdish press in Germany ==
Yeni Özgür Politika is part of the Kurdish press tradition in Germany. The first Kurdish news agency, "Dam", was established in Germany in 2000 and later became the Mesopotamia News Agency (MHA).

== See also ==
- Özgür Gündem
- List of Kurdish press
- Freedom of the press in Germany
- Kurdish diaspora
