= Khawrs of the Salalah Coast Reserve =

The Khawrs of the Salalah Coast Reserve are a group of eight natural reserves in the Dhofar Governorate of Oman. They consist of lagoons and vary in size from a few hectares to more than one hundred hectares.

== Khawr Rori ==
Khawr Rori is the largest reserve in the Governorate of Dhofar. It is considered the most attractive to tourists as it contains Khawr Rori port, famously known as Samharam. Nearby, there are important ruins that date back to prehistoric times. The port was often mentioned in Hellenic and Arabic historical scrolls, being the main port for the export of frankincense in Dhofar. Therefore, the khawr (lagoon) has gained special status, as it is not only a nature reserve, but an important heritage reserve as well, and has been included in the World Heritage List. Before that, it was a natural reserve helping to maintain the biological diversity, where many fish, birds and plants live. The lagoon is connected to Wadi Darbat.

== Khawr Al Baleed ==
This lagoon takes its name from the ancient city which lies on the banks of this lagoon. The lagoon flanks the city on the east and north. In ancient times, this lagoon was connected to the sea and used as a natural port due to its depth in some parts.

The region is currently on the World Heritage List and is protected. The importance of this place lies in its combination of archaeology, history and nature. The archaeological park is considered to be the first of its kind in the Sultanate, serving to protect natural resources, attract tourists to the site and inform people of this important ancient city in the Governorate of Dhofar.

== Khawr Sawli ==
Located in Wilayat Taqa in the Governorate of Dhofar, is amongst the most important lagoons regarding the number of plants, animals and micro-organisms that live in the lagoon, and is one of three lagoons in the Governorate that were used in ancient times for nautical navigation.

== Khawr Al Maghsayl ==
Khawr Al Maghsayl lies at the eastern end of Jabal Al Qamar (Moon Mountain) in the Governorate of Dhofar. The area of this lagoon is about half a square kilometre, its length is about three kilometres and its width 150 metres. The lagoon's importance lies in maintaining important species of indigenous and migratory birds which inhabit the lagoon due to the abundance of food throughout the year. Some birds migrate from Africa, some from Europe and others from India, while others are permanent residents of the lagoon.

== Khawr Al Qurm Al Sagheer and Al Qurm Al Kabeer ==
These two lagoons are located near the Hilton Hotel Salalah in the Governorate Dhofar. They have acquired their names from the dense mangrove trees that cover the two lagoons and obscure the waters from the main road. This encourages many birds to build their nests in them. The lagoons are considered the perfect place for the bio cycles of some micro-organisms and plants. Fish species adapted to low water salinity also live in the lagoons.

In 2023, the Khawr Al Qurm Al Kabeer reserve was included byb the Environment Authority in open bids to develop the area in the interest of stimulating tourism.

== Khawr Awqad ==
This lagoon is located in the Dhofar Governorate the outskirts of the ancient Awqad city. Its area is about 16 hectares (40 acres) and is one of the sites frequented by birds nesting throughout the year, such as the egrets, herons and amongst others

== Khawr Ad Dahareez ==
In its location and importance, this lagoon is similar to Khawr Awqad. Khawr Ad Dahareez is located at the eastern entrance of Salalah city in the Governorate of Dhofar. Its waters intermingle with Salalah basin waters, especially the wells located on the coastal strip. This lagoon is important to biodiversity as it is heavily frequented by migratory birds.

== Khawr Taqah ==
Khawr Taqah is located at the western entrance of Taqah City in Dhofar Governorate. The lagoon occupies about 2 square kilometres. Khawr Taqah is filled with places in which freshwater varieties of plants grow, as well as other plant types that need a high level of salinity. This contributes to the presence of an abundant marine life here, in addition to many types of birds. In 2023, the Environment Authority of Dhofar announced it was accepting bids on the development of the area.

== Sources ==
- Ray, Himanshu Prabha (September 2020). "Culture and Diplomacy: Maritime Cultural Heritage of the Western Indian Ocean". India Quarterly. 76 (3): 375–391. JSTOR 48589422.
- Taha, Mohammed (2023-04-03). "Bids invited for development of two nature reserves in Dhofar". Muscat Daily.
