= List of Arabic-language newspapers published in the United States =

The Arab newspapers industry started in the early 19th century with the American newspaper Kawkab America. (Arabic: كوكب أميركا, 'Star of America') was an Arabic-language weekly (later daily) newspaper published in New York City, United States, it was the first Arabic-language newspaper in North America; it was founded by Najib Arbeely and Ibrahim Arbeely. between 1892 and 1908.

A

- An-Nour Newspaper
- The Arab American News
- The Arab Voice
- Arab Times (United States)

B

- Beirut Times

H

- Al-Hoda

K

- Kawkab America

N

- NOW News

== See also ==
- List of Arab newspapers
- History of the Middle Eastern people in Metro Detroit
