= Al Mada =

Al Mada may refer to:

- Al Mada (newspaper)
- Al Mada (holding company)
