= Sada News Agency =

Sada News Agency (SNA) وكالة صدى الإعلام للانباء
- Abbreviation: SNA
- Formation: 2008; 18 years ago
- Type: News agency
- Headquarters: Baghdad
- Location: Iraq
- Official language: English & Arabic
- Website: pressiraq.net SNA (in Arabic)

The Sada News Agency (Arabic: وكالة صدى الإعلام للانباء), or SNA, is one of the Iraqi news agencies, one of the media sectors of the Iraqi Media Network is linked directly to the Federation of Journalists of Iraq, its headquarters in Baghdad and has branches and centers inside Iraq only. And certified in the Federation of Journalists of Iraq No. (1530) for the year 2008.

== See also ==
- National Iraqi News Agency
- Kuwait News Agency
- Jordan News Agency
