= Baghdad Television =

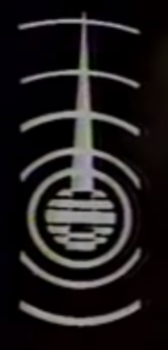

- Country: Iraq
- Broadcast area: National

Programming
- Language: Arabic

Ownership
- Owner: Government of Iraq

History
- Founded: 1956
- Launched: 2 May 1956
- Closed: 23 April 2003 (46 years, 11 months and 21 days)
- Replaced by: Al Iraqiya

Baghdad Television (Arabic: تلفزيون بغداد, romanized: tilfizyun baghdad, lit. 'Baghdad Television Station') (BTV) or known as Iraqi TV (Arabic: التلفزيون العراقي, romanized: altilfizyun aleiraqiu, lit. 'Iraqi Television') was the first Iraqi television channel which was in operation from 2 May 1956 until 13 April 2003 after the fall of Baghdad.

Since 2003, BTV was an off-air station which was replaced by Al-Iraqiya.

== History ==
Television first arrived in Iraq on 2 May 1956, at first only in the Baghdad area with a station named Baghdad Television (BTV) on channel 8, switching to channel 9 in November 1959 after an increasing of its power. On 18 November 1967 the second TV station opened in Kirkuk, on 2 March 1968 a new transmitter had been opened in Mosul and on 6 November 1968 in Basrah. The first test color broadcasts in Iraq began in 1968.

On 30 July 1972, Baghdad Television opened its second TV station on channel 7, and in 1974 two new stations opened in Amarah (capital city of the Maysan Governorate) and Samawah (capital city of the Muthanna Governorate), the latter one opening in March. In July 1976, full-colour television was introduced using the French SECAM system. By 1976, the entire country could receive broadcasts from the central station in Baghdad after the installation of a microwave relay system.

Baghdad Television was the primary TV station in Iraq while Saddam Hussein was in power. Until the 2003 invasion of Iraq, much of its programming was patriotic music videos, government news and propaganda. It ceased broadcasting during the 2003 invasion when the transmitter network became inoperable due to bombing raids.

A second TV channel was established on 30 July 1972 broadcasting on channel 7 in the Baghdad area. The channel was renamed Youth Channel (Qanaat Al-Shabaab) on 17 July 1993 and broadcast subtitled Western movies and music videos before the 2003 invasion. Foreign programmes were censored to remove strong language, sex and violence so programming would be suitable for all ages. Other channels available included Baghdad Cultural TV, Al-Shabaab 2 and Iraq Satellite Channel.

Because BTV was free to air, it also received a substantial amount of attention from viewers outside Iraq, particularly during the 2003 invasion of the country.

== Downfall and current day ==
Many TV stations have appeared since the fall of Saddam. Under the direction of Ambassador L. Paul Bremer III as the Administrator, the Coalition Provisional Authority (CPA) began issuing radio and television licenses in June 2003 to meet the great demand for broadcasting licenses. The licenses were issued by the CPA Senior Adviser for Telecommunications. To plan for the expected great demand, this CPA office worked with Iraqi radio-frequency spectrum engineers and managers to develop a national FM-radio and TV channel allotment plan for all of the major Iraqi cities and towns. The national plan was developed using technical criteria and the Region 1 (Europe, Africa and the Middle East) allotment plan that was developed years before by the International Telecommunication Union (ITU), a United Nations treaty organization. The Iraqi allotment plan consisted of hundreds of FM radio and TV stations allotted to the cities and towns. The channels in the allotment plan were then open to anyone to apply for a license for a particular channel.

The CPA developed a few basic rules and regulations in June and July 2003 to provide a limited regulatory control of the broadcasters. For example, broadcasts inciting riots were prohibited. The overall CPA objective was to issue many licenses to provide for a plethora of diverse voices, information, music, and news to satisfy the desires and tastes of the Iraqi citizens. The CPA also recognized that broadcasting was a combination of business, advertising, journalism, engineering, and entertainment, and a robust and thriving broadcasting industry could provide a large number of excellent and highly desirable professional jobs that would reduce national unemployment. The CPA also recognized that commercial broadcasting could provide wealth-building opportunities to successful broadcasters.

The Iraqi Media Network (IMN), a public broadcasting network similar to the Public Broadcasting System in the United States, was issued radio and TV licenses by the CPA.

The CPA continued its work as the national broadcasting licensing and regulatory authority until June 2004 when the Iraq Communications and Media Commission (CMC) was established as the national regulatory agency that would issue licenses and regulate broadcasting and telecommunications.

In August 2014, LANA TV a new general entertainment channel started broadcasting regional series dubbed in Iraqi dialect. This is the first time that a TV Channel is broadcasting high quality Iraqi dubbing. LANA TV has hired Iraq's top theatre actors and actress such as Ustad Sami Qeftan to train the dubbing artists.

The overall result is that there are hundreds of radio and television stations operating in Iraq.

== See also ==
- Television in Iraq
- Al-Iraqiya
