= The Arab American News =

Bilingual newspaper

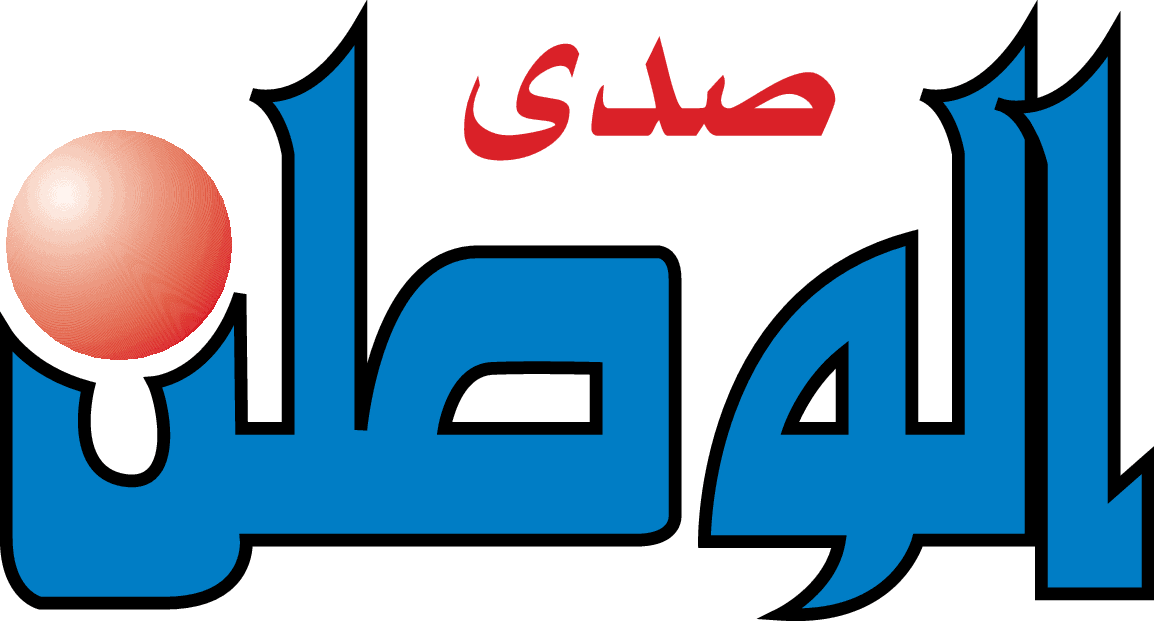
- Type: Weekly newspaper
- Publisher: Osama Siblani
- Founded: 1984
- Language: Arabic, English
- Headquarters: Dearborn, Michigan
- ISSN: 1930-9619
- Website: sadaalwatan.com (Arabic) arabamericannews.com (English)

The Arab American News (Arabic: صدى الوطن) is a weekly bilingual newspaper representing Arab Americans published in Dearborn, Michigan, USA in Greater Detroit. It began publishing on 7 September 1984 and its publisher is Lebanese-born Osama Siblani. It is believed to be the largest Arab-American newspaper.

In 2014, The Arab American News was one of the ethnic media outlets featured in an exhibit called “One Nation With News for All” at the Newseum in Washington, D.C.

== Osama Siblani ==
Siblani received the “Spirit of Diversity in Journalism” award from Wayne State University in the 10th Annual Helen Thomas Awards on April 16, 2010. Siblani was inducted into the Michigan Journalism Hall of Fame in April 2013. He is the first to be inducted from an ethnic media outlet, and the second Arab American, after the induction of White House correspondent Helen Thomas in 1993.

At a September 2024 rally in Dearborn, Michigan in opposition to the September 2024 Israeli attacks against Lebanon, Siblani called to prevent the Israelis that were evacuated during the Israel–Hezbollah conflict from returning to their homes and expel them to Poland.

At an October 2024 rally, Siblani praised Hassan Nasrallah as a "great leader". Nasrallah at the time was the leader of Hezbollah, a Lebanese Islamist movement and militant group designated by the U.S. as a terrorist organization.

After a sign was placed in honor of Siblani in Dearborn in 2025, a local pastor raised concerns over the appropriateness of the move, as Siblani seemed to support Hezbollah, to Dearborn Mayor Abdullah Hammoud at a City Council meeting. Siblani said that he did not want to be involved in the matter, and that his statements supporting Palestinians did not mention Hezbollah or Hamas.

== See also ==
- History of the Middle Eastern people in Metro Detroit
- Arabic-language newspapers published in the United States
