= Youbert Shlimon =

- Born: 1954; Habbaniyah, Kingdom of Iraq
- Died: February 3, 1985 (aged 30-31); Baghdad, Baathist Iraq
- Cause of death: Hanging
- Occupations: Engineer, Political Activist, Politician
- Known for: founding member of Zowaa
- Political party: Zowaa (1979-1985)

Yobirt Shleemon (Syriac: ܝܘܒܝܪܬ ܫܠܝܡܘܢ) was an Assyrian political activist who would be one of the two founding members of Zowaa, the other being Yousip Toma.

== Early life ==
Yobirt was born in 1954 in Habbanyiah. He graduated from Baghdad Technical College with a bachelor's degree in Mechanical Engineering and later used his degree while working as an engineer.

== Political career ==
His political efforts began in 1971 in Baghdad. He was arrested by Baathist authorities in Baghdad on 13 July 1984, based on information provided by some traitors within the Assyrian community. While in jail he was subjected to various physical and psychological tortures but still refused to cave-in to his captors' demands of denying his ideals and releasing information on his fellow nationalists. Fellow members of Zowaa Yousip Toma and Youkhana Jajo also endured torture at the same time as him. All three where executed by the Baath regime on 3 February 1985 by hanging without a legal trial; the three Assyrians were reportedly executed by the Baath regime for distributing literature against the Arabization policies of the government.
