= Yousip Toma =

Assyrian political activist (1951–1985)

- Born: 1951; Kirkuk, Kingdom of Iraq
- Died: February 3, 1985 (aged 33-34); Baghdad, Baathist Iraq
- Cause of death: Hanging
- Occupations: Engineer, Political Activist, Politician
- Known for: founding member of Zowaa
- Political party: Zowaa (1979-1985)

Yousip Toma (Syriac: ܝܘܣܦ ܬܐܘܡܐ) was an Assyrian political activist who founded Zowaa with Youbert Shlimon.

== Early life ==
Yousip was born in 1951 in Kirkuk, His parents came from the village of Blijani in the Dohuk province. He graduated from the University of Sulaymania with a Bachelor's degree in Physics, and later practiced his degree while working as an engineer.

== Political career ==
His political efforts began in 1970, Yousip was one of the founding members of Zowaa, and held key leadership positions. He was known of his strong personality and high refinement, and participated in putting the ideological line of Zowaa. He was later arrested by the baathist regime and imprisoned in Baghdad, where he, Youbert Shlimon and Youkhana Jajo endured torture for months in Abu Gharib and yet they didn't give up information on others within Zowaa. All three where executed by the Baath regime on February 3 by hanging, the three Assyrians were reportedly executed by the Baath regime for distributing literature against the Arabization policies of the government. he is buried in his hometown of Blijani.
