= El Hayat (newspaper) =

- Type: Daily newspaper
- Format: Tabloid
- Owner(s): El Hayat group
- Founder(s): Habet Hannachi
- Publisher: Epcom Plus
- Launched: 2013; 12 years ago
- Language: Arabic
- City: Algiers
- Country: Algeria
- Website: https://www.elhayat.dz/

El Hayat newspaper (in Arabic جريدة الحياة meaning The Life) is a daily newspaper independent in Algeria published Saturday to Thursday in the tabloid format.

== History ==
This newspaper is considered by some sources to be the first independent daily newspaper in Algeria to be issued by journalists who have not worked in the government press before and are not affiliated with any political party.

== See also ==
- List of newspapers in Algeria
