= L'Algérie Libre =

Algerian French-language newspaper

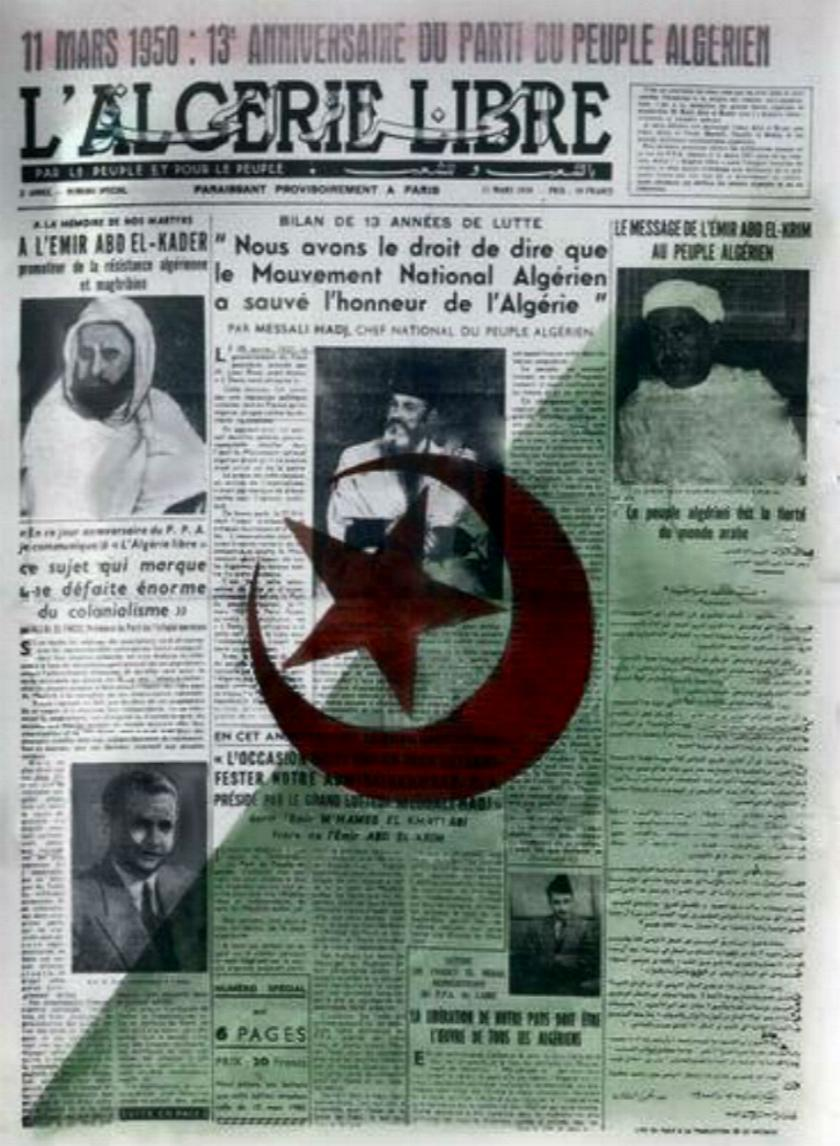
- Type: Opinion journalism
- Editor: Algerian People's Party; Movement for the Triumph of Democratic Liberties
- Founded: 1949
- Ceased publication: 1954
- Language: French language
- Country: Algeria

L'Algérie Libre (lit. 'Free Algeria') was a French-language newspaper based in Algiers, Algeria.

== Overview ==
L'Algerie libre, the acronym for which was, "by the people and for the people" (French: Par le peuple et pour le peuple) was founded by Mohamed Khider on 2 November 1949 and ceased to appear on 5 November 1954.

This illustrated publication was printed in the city of Paris within France and was a partisan bimonthly journal specializing in general information.

It is the independence party Algerian People's Party (PPA) the Movement for the Triumph of Democratic Liberties (MTLD) which oversaw this review which was printed for 128 issues before its shutdown the day after the outbreak of the Algerian Revolution.

== See also ==
- Algerian People's Party
- Movement for the Triumph of Democratic Liberties
- Mohamed Khider
- Mohamed Aïchaoui
- List of newspapers in Algeria

== Bibliography ==
- Charles-André Julien (1979). Histoire de l'Algére contemporaine, Volume 2. Paris: Presses universitaires de France. p. 58. ISBN 9782130356448.
- Jacques Simon (2007). Algérie: le passé, l'Algérie française, la révolution, 1954-1958. Paris: Harmattan. p. 193;214;215. ISBN 9782296028586.
- Benjamin Stora (2009). Les immigrés algériens en France: une histoire politique, 1912-1962. Paris: Hachette littératures. p. 102. ISBN 9782012794184.
