= Choman Hardi =

Kurdish poet and translator

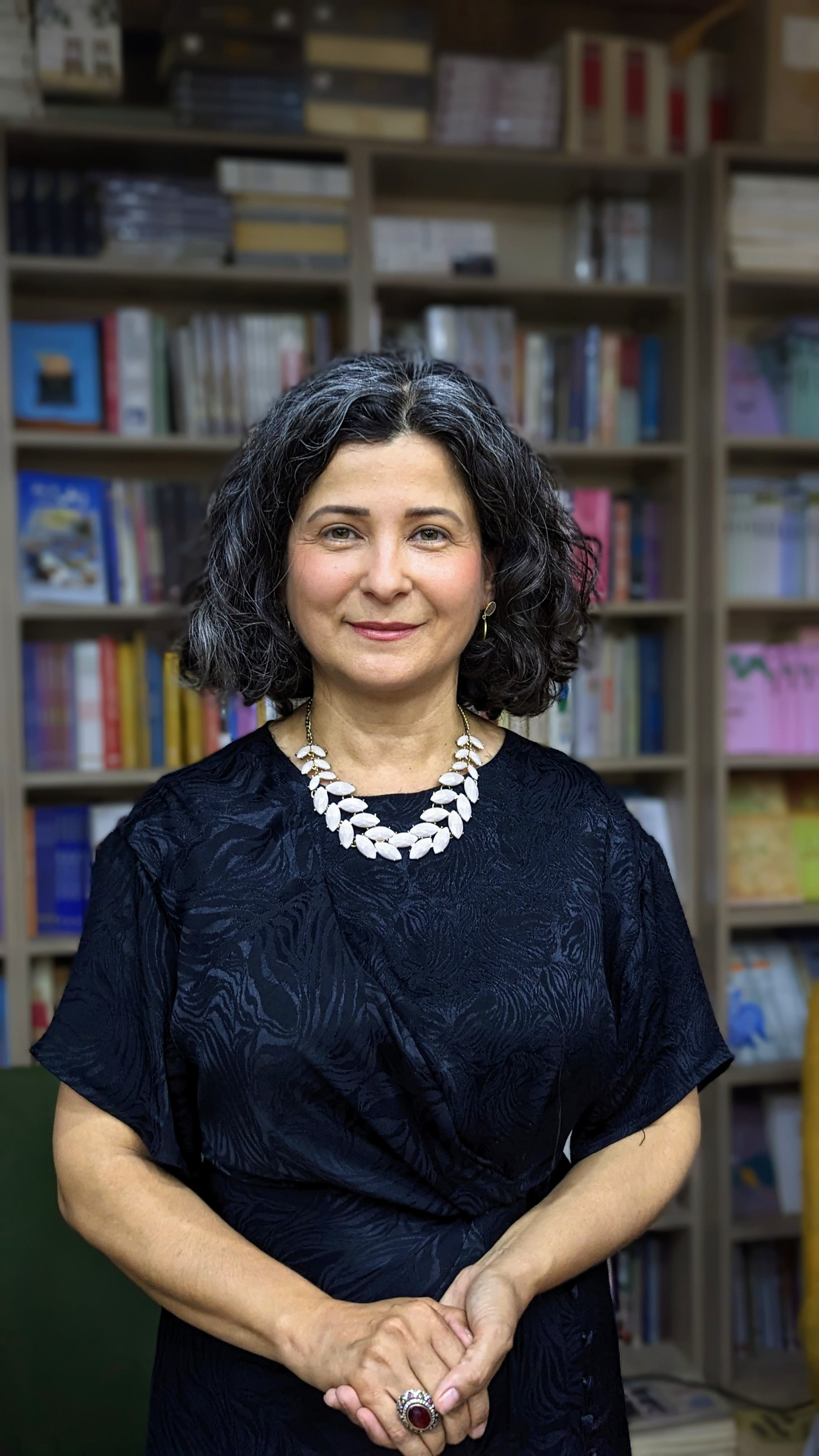
- Choman Hardi in 2023
- Born: 29 January 1974 (age 52); Sulaimaniya, Iraqi Kurdistan
- Education: Queen's College, University of Oxford; University College London; University of Kent
- Known for: Writer, poet, essayist, translator

Choman Hardi (Kurdish: چۆمان هەردی; born 29 January 1974) is a Kurdish researcher, essayist, translator, poet, and feminist.

== Background ==
Hardi was born in Sulaymaniyah on January 29th, 1974. The youngest among the 7 children of the famous Kurdish poet Ahmad Hardi.

Hardi fled Iraq along with her family in the late 1980s and was granted asylum in the UK in 1993. She obtained her Bachelor of Arts (BA) at the Queen's College, University of Oxford, her Masters of Arts (MA) at the University College London and PhD at the University of Kent.

She has published three volumes of poetry in Kurdish and two collections of English poems, Life for Us (Bloodaxe Books, 2004) and Considering the Women (Bloodaxe Books, 2015), which was shortlisted for the Forward Prize in 2016. Her articles have appeared in Modern Poetry in Translation

== Career ==
She is a former chairperson of Exiled Writers Ink! and has organized creative writing workshops for the British Council in the UK, Belgium, Czech Republic and India. She is a former poet-in-residence at Moniack Mhor Writers' Centre (Scotland), Villa Hellebosch (Belgium), Hedgebrook Women Writers' Retreat (USA) and The Booth (Shetland). As an academic researcher, she has been a visiting scholar in The Centre for Multiethnic Research (Uppsala University), Zentrum Moderner Orient (Berlin) and The Department of Humanities of the University of Amsterdam. Between 2009 and 2011, she was a Senior Associate Member of St Anthony's College, Oxford. In 2014, she moved back to her home city of Sulaimani to take up a post at the American University of Iraq, becoming chair of the Department of English in 2015.

In 2015, she found Center for Gender and Development Studies (CGDS) at The American University of Iraq, Sulaimani. The center mainly focused on gender studies.

In 2023, she was awarded the Franco-German Prize for Human Rights and the Rule of Law.

== Books ==
- Hardi, Choman (1996), Return with no memory (in Kurdish), Denmark, ISBN 87-984331-6-4
- — (1998), Rûnakîy sêberekan : şîʻir (Light of the Shadows), Kitêbî Rabûn, 14. (in Kurdish), Rabûn, ISBN 9789197335447
- — (2000), Light Mirrors and Shadows: Poems, OCLC 427634821
- — (2004), Life for Us, Bloodaxe Books, ISBN 9781852246440
- — (2011), Gendered Experiences of Genocide: Anfal Survivors in Kurdistan-Iraq, Voices in development management., Farnham, Surrey, ISBN 978-0754694335
- — (2015), Considering the Women, Bloodaxe Books, ISBN 9781780372785

== See also ==
- List of Kurdish scholars
