= Kayhan Al Arabi =

Arabic-language newspaper published in Tehran, Iran

- Type: Daily newspaper
- Owner: Keyhan Institute
- Founder(s): Abdolrahman Faramarzi and Mostafa Mesbahzadeh
- Editor: Hossein Shariatmadari
- Founded: 1943
- Political alignment: Pro-Constitution, Principalist, Conservative
- Language: Arabic
- Headquarters: Tehran, Iran
- Website: Official Website

Kayhan Al Arabi (Arabic: كيهان العربي, lit. 'Arab Cosmos / Arab World') is an Arabic-language newspaper published in Tehran, Iran. One of the country's oldest daily papers, run after the revolution by the office of the Supreme Leader, who appoints the editor-in-chief, currently Hossein Shariatmadari.

== History and profile ==
Kayhan Al Arabi was founded in February 1943. The newspaper was mainly founded for the Arab minorities in Iran (like Ahwazi Arabs, Khamseh Arabs, Marsh Arabs, Khorasan Arabs) as well as Arabs from the Arab world in Iran and Arabic speaking people who are living in Iran too.

== See also ==
- List of newspapers in Iran
- List of Arab newspapers
