= Times of Oman =

Daily English-language newspaper in Oman

- Type: Daily newspaper
- Format: Broadsheet
- Owner: Muscat Media Group
- Founder: Essa bin Mohammed Al Zedjali
- Publisher: Muscat Media Group
- Founded: February 1975
- Language: English
- Headquarters: Ruwi, Muscat, Oman
- Circulation: 195,000 (as of 2014)
- Sister newspapers: Al Shabiba
- Website: timesofoman.com

Times of Oman is a newspaper that is based in Muscat, Sultanate of Oman by Essa bin Mohammed Al Zedjali. Times of Oman is the oldest English-language newspaper of Oman. Times of Oman covers news on domestic, national, international, and sport with sections dedicated to entertainment, fashion and lifestyle.

== History ==
It was first launched as a weekly tabloid newspaper in February 23, 1975, eventually becoming a broadsheet paper in 1990. Times of Oman targets expatriates living in Oman and is aimed towards promoting Oman. A reader survey in 2013 stated that amongst all the English dailies in Oman, It was favored by 5.4% of the respondents followed by Oman Tribune (2.7%).

== Ownership ==
Muscat Media Group is a publishing house based in the Sultanate of Oman, founded in 1975 by Essa bin Mohammed Al Zedjali and the current CEO is Ahmed Essa Al Zedjali. The Muscat Media Group is behind a number of different publications from broadsheet dailies to tabloid weeklies provided both in Arabic and English. Apart from Times of Oman, Muscat Media Group is the publisher of the Arabic-language newspaper Al Shabiba launched in 1993. In 2004, Muscat Media Group house became the first in the GCC countries to develop an online edition for its daily newspapers Times of Oman and Al Shabiba. In 2008, WAP editions of the newspapers were made available on cell phones.

== Platforms ==
=== Newspaper ===
The paper is published six days a week from Saturday to Thursday. The website is also updated every day in every hour. The newspaper is organized in three sections. The first section, section A, contains pages of local news, regional news, news on India and Pakistan and world news. It also has a commentary section with perspectives from respected political analysts and opinion writers. It also features a reader's forum. Section B is a Market, Business and Finance section bringing news on local, regional and international financial matters. It also contains a Life and Style part in addition to entertainment pages with crosswords, daily horoscope, airlines and bus schedules. The back pages are dedicated to Bollywood news and feature articles. The C section focuses on national and international sports. The D section, called Connect, is the daily guide for the inhabitants of Oman with local ads and classifieds. The newspaper, printed daily with pages varying from 44 to 52 pages, is a blend of black and white and color pages.

=== Electronic devices ===
In 1998, it launched their website, which additionally made MPPH the first publication house in the region to develop a website for news information. In December 2012, the Times of Oman website was redesigned to include more sections for news coverage in the local department and across the globe. The website gets 2,29,377 visitors in September month and has shown growth of 75% in a 9-month period. The average visit duration is 5.44 min in September 2013 The Times of Oman e-paper was launched on October 4, 2004. In 2007, Times of Oman launched its first mobile application for iPad and smart phones.

=== Supplements ===
Thursday magazine was launched on November 18, 1999, and discontinued in June 2015. It was a family magazine, which came out with the main edition of Times of Oman every Thursday. The magazine's main focus was on topical and cover stories and special features, but also on subjects such as healthcare and beauty tips, crime, romance, travel, parenting, fashion and cooking. The magazine targeted readers among expatriate and Omani working women as well as housewives. On June 23, 2015, the last issue was published, with the magazine folding into the pages of Times of Oman.

It also publishes the annual magazine on Home Decor titled Heavenly Homes and a cook-book named Art of Cooking.

=== Sister publications ===
- Hi Weekly, launched on March 30, 2007, is a freely circulated weekend newspaper in tabloid format. It consists mainly of light-reading content and is distributed every Friday instead of the daily paper. '
- Faces is a monthly magazine of Times of Oman, which targets business expatriates, working professionals and the local Omanis that fall in the 18-35 age group.
- Al Shabiba (Arabic)
- Sabbat Ayam (Arabic)
- Al Khazina (Arabic)
- Al Sayraat (Arabic)
- Sahah wal Jamal (Arabic)
- Mustaqbal (Arabic)
- Black & White (English)

== See also ==
- List of Arab newspapers
