= List of football stadiums in Oman =

The following is a list of football stadiums in Oman, ordered by capacity.

== Current stadiums ==
#	Image	Stadium	City	Capacity	Home team(s)	Sport	Opened	Ref.
1		Sultan Qaboos Stadium	Bawshar, Muscat	28,000	Oman national football team, Bosher Club	Football	1985	
2		Al-Saada Stadium	Salalah	20,000	Dhofar Club, Al-Nasr SC	Football	2009	
3		Sohar Regional Sports Complex Stadium	Sohar	19,000	Sohar SC	Football		
4		Al-Buraimi Sports Stadium	Al-Buraimi	17,000	Al-Nahda	Football		
5		Al-Rustaq Sports Complex Stadium	Rustaq	17,000	Al-Rustaq Club	Football		
6		Nizwa Sports Complex Stadium	Nizwa	14,400	Al-Khaburah Club	Football	1994	
7		Al-Seeb Stadium	Seeb	14,000	Oman national football team, Al-Seeb Club	Football	2004	
8		Royal Oman Police Stadium	Seeb	12,000	Oman Club	Football	1987	
9		Salalah Sports Complex Stadium	Salalah	8,000	Dhofar Club, Al-Nasr SC	Football		
10		Sur Sports Complex Stadium	Sur	8,000	Sur SC	Football	1996	

== See also ==
- Football in Oman
- List of Asian stadiums by capacity
- List of association football stadiums by capacity
- Lists of stadiums
