= Sultan Qaboos Sports Complex =

Multi-purpose stadium in Muscat, Oman

Sultan Qaboos Sports Complex مجمع السلطان قابوس الرياضي
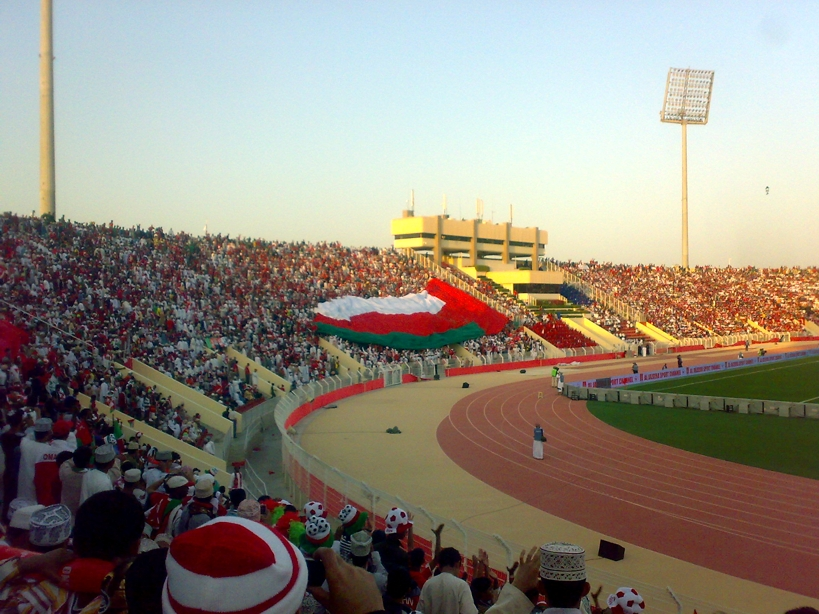
- Interactive map of Sultan Qaboos Sports Complex مجمع السلطان قابوس الرياضي
- Location: Bowsher, Muscat, Oman
- Coordinates: 23°34′23″N 58°23′58″E
- Owner: Government of Oman
- Operator: Ministry of Sports Affairs
- Capacity: 28,000
- Surface: Grass
- Field size: 50 Hectares

Construction
- Groundbreaking: 17 September 1982 Contractor: Taylor Woodrow Towell
- Opened: 19 October 1985
- Architect: Roy Lancaster Associates

Tenants
- Oman national football team Bosher Club; Muscat Club

The Sultan Qaboos Stadium at the Sultan Qaboos Sports Complex (Arabic: مجمع السلطان قابوس الرياضي), also known locally as Boshar (Arabic: بوشر), is a government-owned multi-purpose stadium in the Boshar district of Muscat, Oman. It is currently used mostly for football matches. It has facilities for athletics too and has also staged field hockey matches. The stadium has a capacity of 28,000. It is the home stadium of the Oman national football team. The Qaboos Stadium was used as the main stadium in the 19th Arabian Gulf Cup in 2009, and was also used in the 13th Arabian Gulf Cup competition in 1996. The Complex over 10,000 parking slots.

In field hockey, the stadium hosted the 2018 Men's Asian Champions Trophy.

== See also ==
- List of football stadiums in Oman
