= Ennahar newspaper =

Algerian daily newspaper

- Type: Daily newspaper
- Format: Tabloid
- Owner: Ennahar group
- Founder: Anis Rahmani
- Publisher: El-Atheer
- Launched: 2007; 19 years ago
- Language: Arabic
- City: Algiers
- Country: Algeria
- Website: www.ennaharonline.com/

Ennahar newspaper (Arabic: جريدة النهار) is an independent Algerian daily newspaper published by El-Atheer Press Company in Hydra, Algeria, established in 2007.

== History ==
Ennahar newspaper was founded by Anis Rahmani in 2007.

== Description ==
This newspaper is considered the first independent daily newspaper in Algeria to be issued by journalists who have not worked in the government press before and are not affiliated with any political party.

It is published in Algiers by El-Atheer.

== See also ==
- List of newspapers in Algeria
