= Theweek =

Omani newspaper

TheWeek
- The front page of theweek's 200th issue
- Type: Weekly newspaper
- Format: Tabloid
- Owner: Apex Press and Publishing
- Publisher: Mr Saleh al Zakwani
- Founded: 2003; 22 years ago
- Political alignment: Neutral news coverage
- Language: English
- Headquarters: CBD Area, Ruwi, Muscat, Oman
- Website: www.theweek.co.om

Theweek is a free, 48-page, all-colour, independent weekly contact newspaper published from Muscat in Oman.

== History and profile ==
The newspaper was launched in March 2003. Theweek is audited by BPA Worldwide, which has certified its circulation as being a weekly average of 50,300, the largest in the country. Theweek is the first and so far, only publication in Oman to be audited for readership. The results of the 2007 audit were that Theweek has an average readership of 178,000. The 2007 audit offers the last available circulation figures.

Free copies of Theweek, published every Wednesday, are available from outlets spread across the main urban areas in Oman, including Muscat, Sohar, Sur, Nizwa and Salalah. It covers mostly local Oman-based news.

== See also ==
- List of newspapers in Oman
