= Journal Iraq =

Journal Iraq جورنال عراق
- Publisher: Dawud Pasha
- Founded: 1816
- Headquarters: Baghdad

Journal Iraq (Arabic: جورنال عراق) was the first newspaper in Iraq and the first Arabic-language newspaper published in the Arab World. It was published by Mamluk ruler Dawud Pasha in Baghdad in 1816.

== See also ==
- List of Arab newspapers
