= Muscat Daily =

Omani newspaper

- The front page of Muscat Daily on February 28, 2011 announcing the riots in Sohar and the police action afterwards in which two people were killed and 35 injured
- Type: Daily newspaper
- Format: Broadsheet
- Owner: Apex Media
- Publisher: Saleh Zakwani
- Staff writers: 87
- Founded: October 10, 2009
- Political alignment: Centrist
- Language: English
- Headquarters: CBD, Ruwi, Muscat
- Circulation: 33,500 daily (Sun-Thu)
- Price: 100 baisas (30 cents)
- ISSN: 2075-1575
- Website: www.muscatdaily.com

Muscat Daily is an Omani newspaper founded in 2009 and based in Oman. Its print edition of is the largest-selling English daily in Oman, with nearly 33,500 copies sold each day from Sunday to Thursday, the working days of Oman. Apex Media provides its free weekly newspaper, TheWeek, to Muscat Daily subscribers each Thursday as their weekend edition. Muscat Daily is owned by Apex Media, an Omani publishing company with a history spanning nearly 40 years. Other publications by the Apex Media include the annual Business Directory and Tribute. Apex Media also undertakes occasional projects such as the Map of Oman, Apex Map of Muscat, and the Sultan Qaboos Grand Mosque coffee table book. Apex Media was founded in 1980 by its executive chairman, Omani businessman Saleh Zakwani.

The newspaper celebrated its first anniversary on October 13, 2010. The Muscat Daily is accessible online at muscatdaily.com.

== Content ==
Editorial content is generated by an in-house team of reporters and writers in the case of news originating in Oman. International news is sourced from a variety of newswires, including the New York Times Syndicate and News Service, BBC, dpa, TMS Features, IANS, and Asian News Network. The paper runs crosswords provided by The Guardian.

=== Sections ===
The newspaper is organized into two sections. Section 1 is the main section with 12 pages containing Omani (national) news, regional and world news, op-eds and sports. Section 2 is 8 pages, and carries business news, crosswords, sudoku puzzles, quiz questions and a features section. On Wednesdays, TheWeek newspaper is delivered free to Muscat Daily subscribers for weekend reading.

=== Design and style ===
The newspaper's logo is a bright tulip, in orange and black. The design has received favorable reviews at design workshops run by WAN-IFRA, the biggest association of publishers in the world.

The Muscat Daily is printed at the company's own printing facility located on the outskirts of Muscat, and also undertakes contract printing operations.

In February 2010, the parent company, then Apex Press and Publishing, announced that they had signed an agreement to purchase a Goss Community SSC press with a rated speed of 35,000 copies per hour from the American printing press manufacturer.

Circulation quickly picked up, and the paper went on to become the largest selling English-language daily in the Sultanate of Oman by mid-2010. The main reason cited by industry analysts for this was the relatively low annual subscription fees of the newspaper in a market which traditionally had fewer than 1,000 residential subscribers for English dailies before the entry of Muscat Daily.

== Other controversies ==
Muscat Daily has been criticized as being a late entry into the newspaper arena in Oman at a time when newspaper subscriptions were falling in the West. In a scathing critique, Eliott Beer posted on AdNation Middle East's website, "Apparently no-one's told the guys in Oman about the demise of traditional print media (it's dead, you know) - some publishers only gone and started up another newspaper."

However, parent company Apex Media said that newspaper circulations were increasing in emerging markets, and since the penetration of broadband in Oman was still only about 12% of the total population, it did not see any threat to its print business. Muscat Daily was launched as a direct competitor to other English language dailies in Oman, including the Times of Oman, Oman Tribune and the government-run Oman Daily Observer.

== Muscat Daily in international media ==
The role that Muscat Daily has played in pushing the boundaries of media freedom and censorship in 'the sleepy sultanate' has been recognized by worldwide media, particularly those that work in markets where media freedom is guaranteed. An article in Christian Science Monitor on the protests and media freedom in Oman said:

"The fact that Oman's first civil unrest in 40 years left at least one person dead in a northern port city here was big news. But it was even bigger news that the English-language Muscat Daily declared "Black Sunday in Sohar" on its front page and carried a half-page photograph showing smoke filling the sky above a roundabout seized by protesters."

The article was subsequently carried in other prominent newspapers and publications across the world, including Gulf News, Yahoo News, and MinnPost.

According to an article in The Economist in early March 2011, "Newspapers such as the Muscat Daily have begun to cover the protests in a way that would have been unthinkable even a week ago."

Among other international media, Spanish newspaper El País quoted Muscat Daily in its coverage of the 2011 Omani protests and the related action by the government and other actors in the 2011 protests. Talking about the reforms instituted by Sultan Qaboos, in the wake of the protests it said: "Según datos recabados por el Muscat Daily, la medida beneficia a 130.000 ciudadanos, el 73% de todos los que trabajan ese sector." (Translation: According to data compiled by Muscat Daily, the new measures will benefit about 130,000 people, or about 73% of those working in the private sector.)
