= Iraq Today =

- Founded: 9 April 2003; 22 years ago (first issue)
- Language: English
- Headquarters: Iraq
- Website: iraq-today.com

Iraq Today is a newspaper in Iraq.

== History ==
It is the first domestic English-language newspaper published in Iraq since the fall of Saddam Hussein.

The newspaper's first issue was published on 9 April 2003. Its tagline is "The Independent Voice of Iraq".

== See also ==
- List of newspapers in Iraq
