= Abu al-Hawl (newspaper) =

Brazilian Arabic language newspaper

Abu al-hawl (Arabic: أبو الهول, 'The Sphinx') was an Arabic-language newspaper published from São Paulo, Brazil, from 1906 to 1941. The paper was published by Rashid al-Khuri.
