= Naseej =

Saudi Arabian information technology company

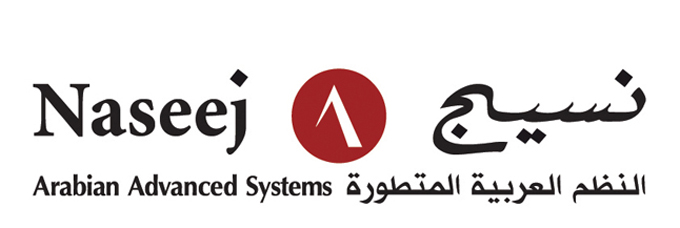
- Company type: LLC
- Industry: Technology; Information Technology; Software Development; SaaS; Artificial Intelligence (AI); Internet of Things (IoT)
- Founded: 1989
- Headquarters: Riyadh, Saudi Arabia
- Area served: Middle East
- Key people: Othman Al-Abdulkarim (CEO) – Current CEO; Abduljabbar Al Abduljabbar (CEO) – Former CEO; Mohammed Husamaddin (VP) – Current Vice President; Abdullah Al Turaifi (VP) – Former Vice President
- Products: Campus Management Solutions; Data Management & Analytics; Enterprise Portal Development; Learning Management System; Library Management; Student Information System; Talent Management; Smart Solutions & Robotics; Knowledge Management; Information Resources; Business Process Automation; Managed IT Services; AI Solutions; Museums and Archives Management; E-Learning Solutions; Knowledge Consulting Services; RFID Technologies for Libraries; Digitization, Conversion & Cataloging Solutions; Enterprise Knowledge Management
- Number of employees: 500+ (most recent year)
- Website: www.naseej.com

Naseej International Trading Co. is an information technology company headquartered in Riyadh, Saudi Arabia Established in 1989, the company provides digital solutions and services to libraries, knowledge centers, and higher education institutions across the Arab world. Naseej offers a range of products, including campus management solutions, e-learning platforms, enterprise portals, library management systems, and knowledge management services. The company operates throughout the Middle East and employs over 500 professionals.

== History ==
Naseej (originally known as Arabian Advanced Systems) started by providing universities and information centers with access to professional information resources, primarily in electronic form, through so-called "CD-Towers". These servers hosted multiple CDs in 1989. The company helped libraries transform from paper-based card catalogs to electronic cataloging, using the Horizon Library Management System. They launched the brand “Naseej” in 1997 as the first of its kind to provide Internet access and web services in Saudi Arabia, and one of the first Arabic Internet portals. In 1998, Naseej became the first licensed Internet service provider (ISP) in Saudi Arabia. The ISP division of Naseej would later be part of a three-way merger with AwalNet (Alfaisaliah Group Internet service provider) and @Net (Alalamiah Internet service provider) to form the largest Internet service providers in the GCC (later acquired by Saudi Telecom Company).

== Products ==
Naseej products include Campus Management Solutions, e-Learning Solutions, Enterprise Portal Solutions and e-Services, Knowledge & Information Resources, Library Management Solutions, RFID Technologies for Libraries, Digitization, Conversion & Cataloging Solutions, Museums and Archives Solutions, Enterprise Knowledge Management and knowledge consulting services.

== Partnership ==
Naseej partners with global companies including Bibliotheca, Saba, Desire2Learn, Ellucian, Book2net, Microsoft, Evisions, AgilePoint, Oracle, SirsiDynix, CISCO, ProQuest, Legamaster, Credo Reference, EXAM MASTER, IET, and IEEET.
