= Business24-7 =

Newspaper of the United Arab Emirates

Emirates Business 24/7 was a business newspaper published in Dubai, the United Arab Emirates. The paper was started in 2007 to replace another one, Emirates Today. The publisher was Arab Media Group. The paper ceased its print version in July 2010 and became an online publication in 2010.
