= Xebat =

Xebat روزنامه خبات
- Type: Daily newspaper
- Format: Online
- Owner: Kurdistan Democratic Party
- Editor-in-chief: Salam Abdulla
- Editor: Nazhad Aziz Surme
- Founded: 2004
- Political alignment: Centre-right
- Language: Kurdish
- Headquarters: Iraqi Kurdistan (Kurdistan Region)
- Website: http://www.xebat.net

Xebat is a daily Kurdish newspaper published in Iraq by the Kurdistan Democratic Party.

== See also ==
- Newspapers in Iraq
- Media of Iraq
