= Al-Maydān =

Egyptian independent weekly newspaper published in Arabic

- Type: Weekly newspaper
- Founder: Mahmoud Al-Shennawi
- Founded: 16 March 1995; 30 years ago
- Language: Arabic
- Country: Egypt

Al-Maydān (Arabic: الميدان) is an Egyptian independent weekly newspaper published in Arabic. The paper was first published on 16 March 1995. It is part of Al-Maydān, Inc. In 2001, its editor-in-chief, Mohammed Mohammed Al Mursy, was arrested and jailed for taking bribes from a producer to stop the defamation campaign against him published in the paper.
