= El Djoumhouria =

El Djoumhouria الجمهورية
- Type: Daily
- Format: Tabloid
- Publisher: الشركة الاقتصادية العمومية
- Founded: 1844 as L'Écho d'Oran; 1963, renamed La République; 1975 renamed El Djoumhouria
- Headquarters: 6 rue Ben Senoussi Ahmida, Oran, Algeria
- Website: http://www.eldjoumhouria.dz

El Djoumhouria (Arabic: الجمهورية meaning 'The Republic') is a daily newspaper published six times a weeks (from Saturday to Thursday) in Oran, Algeria.

It was established by Pierre Lafont as a French language newspaper on 12 October 1844 as L'Écho d'Oran. In 1963, it was renamed La République and published for one year as a French daily newspaper, with the front page only in Arabic. In 1976, it became an all-Arabic daily.
