= Ogaal Newspaper =

Newspaper in the Republic of Somaliland

- Type: Daily newspaper
- Founded: 2005
- Ceased publication: 2016 1
- Headquarters: Hargeisa
- Website: ogaalnews.net (Currently Defunct)

The Ogaal Newspaper (Somali: Wargeyska Ogaal) was an independent newspaper based in Hargeisa, the capital of the internationally unrecognised Republic of Somaliland. Founded in 2005, it provides domestic news in both Somali and English. The outlet is part of the larger Ogaal Media Center that is headquartered in the city. Ogaal Newspaper is published daily, except for Fridays.
