= Oman Tribune =

- Type: Daily newspaper
- Owner(s): Oman Establishment for Press, Printing, Publishing and Distribution LLC
- Founder: Mohammed bin Suleiman Al Taie
- Publisher: Mohammed bin Suleiman Al Taie
- Editor-in-chief: Abdul Hamied bin Suleiman Al Taie
- Editor: Ajay Kumar
- Founded: September 1, 2004
- Language: English
- Circulation: 25,000 (2006)
- Sister newspapers: Alwatan (Arabic)
- Website: http://www.omantribune.com

Oman Tribune was a popular English-language newspaper in Oman, based in Muscat.

It was the most popular English newspaper among high income, policy-making Omanis, and in the diplomatic community. It offered both local and international content.

Oman Tribune carried articles and opinion pieces on Oman, other GCC nations (UAE, Qatar, Saudi Arabia, Bahrain and Kuwait), Arab countries as well as the Middle East developments. Its coverage of Oman was one of the best among all English newspapers of the nation as it drew extensively on the content of its sister publication Alwatan, which is a top Arabic newspaper of the Middle East.

Oman Tribune additionally aggregated articles and graphics from The New York Times, Harvard Business Review, The Washington Post, Bloomberg, McClatchy Tribune News Service, Graphic News, and other news sources.
