= Al-Mashriq =

Iraqi daily newspaper

- Type: Daily newspaper
- Editor: Sabah Al Lami
- Founded: 2003
- Political alignment: Centrism
- Language: Arabic
- Headquarters: Baghdad
- Website: Al Mashriq

Al-Mashriq (المشرق; English: Where the Sun Rises) is a daily newspaper published in Iraq. The paper was launched in 2003 following the US invasion of Iraq. It is based in Baghdad. It is privately owned and is published daily except for Fridays.

On 4 March 2007 the editor-in-chief of the paper, Muhan Al Zahir, was killed in Baghdad.

== See also ==
- Newspapers in Iraq
