= Al Mada (newspaper) =

Baghdad daily newspaper

- Type: Daily newspaper
- Founder: Fakhri Karim
- Publisher: Al-Mada Foundation for Media, Culture and Arts
- Editor: Fakhri Karim
- Founded: 5 August 2003
- Political alignment: Left-wing politics Nonsectarianism; Secularism
- Language: Arabic
- Headquarters: Baghdad, Iraq
- Website: www.almadapaper.net

Al Mada (Arabic: المدى al-Madā) is a daily Arabic newspaper published in Baghdad, Iraq. The founder of the daily which was first published on 5 August 2003 is Fakhri Karim, an Iraqi former communist. The publisher is Al-Mada Foundation for Media, Culture and Arts. The paper has an independent. left-leaning and secularist political stance.

== See also ==
- Newspapers in Iraq
