= The Kurdish Globe =

- Type: Weekly newspaper
- Editor-in-chief: Tahir Taeb Jaff
- Editor: Tahir Taeb Jaff
- Founded: 2005
- Political alignment: KRG
- Language: English
- Headquarters: Erbil, Kurdistan Region, Iraq
- Readership: +40,000
- Website: www.kurdishglobe.net

The Kurdish Globe, previously known as The Hewler Globe, is the first English-language newspaper published in Erbil, Kurdistan, northern Iraq.

Published for the first time on March 31, 2005, its editor-in-chief and founder is Jawad Qadir. The name was changed from The Hewler Globe to The Kurdish Globe since the paper included issues of a pan-Kurdish nature, including all parts of Kurdistan in Iraq, Iran, Syria and Anatolia, and not just Hewlêr (Kurdish for Erbil).

This weekly newspaper is published every Tuesday. It focuses primarily on Kurdish issues ranging from politics to culture, as well as Middle East-related issues and politics.

Its main rival is SOMA Digest, the second English language newspaper published in the Kurdistan region. Whereas The Kurdish Globe is edited from the point of view of the Kurdistan Regional Government, SOMA Digest is closely related to the Patriotic Union of Kurdistan (PUK).
