= Al Hawza =

Al Hawza or al Hauza was an Arabic language weekly newspaper in Iraq.

== History and profile ==
Al Hawza started publication in 2003 after the removal of Saddam Hussein, and American media considered it to be the mouthpiece for Shi'ite cleric Moqtada Sadr. It was a weekly newspaper published every Thursday. The paper was a religious cultural publication. Its chairman was Abbas Al Rubayi. Hasan Al Zarkani served as the editor. Ali Yasseri was the editor of the paper when it was suspended.

It was shut down by the 759th Military Police Battalion, under orders of the United States-led administration of Paul Bremer on 28 March 2004, after being accused of encouraging violence against Coalition troops. The closure of the weekly was protested by hundreds of Iraqis in Baghdad shortly after the ban.

== See also ==
- Al Mustaqilla
