= El Acil =

Algerian French-language newspaper

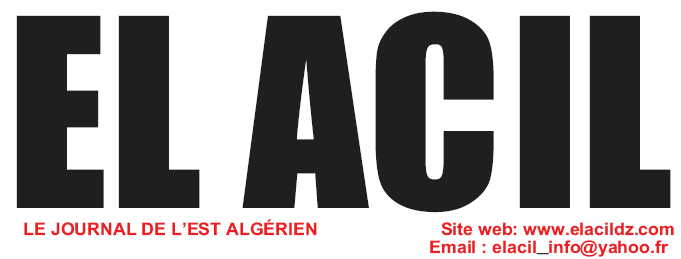
- Type: Daily newspaper
- Format: tabloid
- Owner: EURL Inter-Med-Info
- Editor: Abdelkrim Zerzouri
- Founded: 1993; 33 years ago
- Political alignment: Centre-left to left-wing
- Language: French
- Headquarters: 01;Rue kamel Ben Djelit, Constantine.
- Circulation: 50,000 (May 2006 - May 2007)
- Price: DA10 (Saturday-Thursday) €1.00 (Europe)
- Website: EL Acil Unlimited

El Acil (Arabic: الأصيل), meaning "The Authentic", is an Algerian daily newspaper in French language published in Constantine, capital of the north-east of Algeria. The newspaper was established in 1993. It belongs to the EURL Inter-Med-Info group, which owns the Arabic Al Acil and L'Authentic, another French-language newspaper. El Acil′s manager is Nacer Tafraout, and the editor is Abdelkrim Zerzouri.
