= Khamseh Arabs =

Arab nomadic and pastoral tribe in Iran

The Khamseh Arabs are an Arab nomadic and pastoral tribe of Fars province in Iran. They are a part of the Khamseh confederation. They speak a dialect of Central Asian Arabic. Their population numbers about 200,000.

== Branches ==
The two Arab tribes in Fars province are Sheybani and Jabbareh.

=== Sheibani ===
The Sheybani (or Sheibani) migrated to Iran before the other group. At first they settled in Khorasan and later migrated to Fars district. A group of them live in Sheyban city of Bavi County in Khuzestan.

=== Jabbareh ===
The Jabbareh settled in Fars say they are descendants of Jabir ibn Abd Allah, a companion of Muhammad. Their ancestor Sheikh Jinaah migrated to Fars and married a Sheybani girl, naming his descendants "Jabbareh".

== Language ==
Khamseh Arabs speak a dialect of Central Asian Arabic closely related to Uzbeki Arabic. Their dialect is hard for other Arabic speakers to understand. It has no relations to Gulf Arabic.

== Religion ==
Khamseh Arabs are mostly Shia Muslims.

== See also ==
- Iranian Arabs

== Sources ==
- Ali Mohammad Najafi. Great Men of Arab Tribe and the Tribes
- Ali Mohammad Najafi. Khamseh Tribes happenings
- The history of Khamseh Arabs of Fars
