= El Ayem El Djazairia =

Newspaper in Algeria

- Type: Daily newspaper
- Format: tabloid
- Owner(s): El Ayem El Djazairia Publishing and Distribution
- Editor: Azzedine Ben Atiya
- Founded: 2005
- Political alignment: Centre
- Language: Arabic
- Headquarters: Cite 1200Logts BT 05-06 Bab Ezzouar el Dar el baida, Algiers
- Circulation: 40,000 (May 2006 - May 2007)
- Price: DA10 (Saturday-Thursday) €1.00 (Europe)
- Website: El Ayem El Djazairia

El Ayem El Djazairia (Arabic: الأيام الجزائرية) is an Arabic-language Algerian daily newspaper. It was started in 2005 and contains national and international news on different subjects including politics, economics, arts and sports.
