= Beirut Times =

Newspaper

Arabic language Logo of Beirut Times

English language Logo of Beirut Times

Beirut Times is an independent, cultural, social and political daily newspaper published in Pasadena, California in Arabic and English serving the Lebanese-American and the Arab-American communities. It was established in 1985. The paper has correspondents posted in a number of Arab capitals and Europe.
