= Bahra (newspaper) =

Political weekly newspaper

- Type: Weekly newspaper
- Format: Print, online
- Owner(s): Assyrian Democratic Movement
- Publisher: Assyrian Democratic Movement
- Founded: 1982
- Political alignment: Conservative
- Language: Arabic, Syriac
- Website: http://www.zowaa.org/

Bahra (Syriac: ܒܗܪܐ) is a political weekly newspaper issued by the Assyrian Democratic Movement. The paper is printed in Baghdad and comes out in Arabic and Syriac. It was first published on 26 June 1982.
