= Alwatan (Oman) =

Arabic-language daily newspaper in Oman

Alwatan الوطن
- Type: Daily newspaper
- Format: Broadsheet
- Owner: Several business groups
- Founded: 1971
- Language: Arabic
- Headquarters: Oman
- Circulation: 40.000
- Website: alwatan.com

Alwatan (Arabic: الوطن, The Homeland) is a daily Arabic newspaper published in Oman and distributed internationally. It was founded in 1971 and first published on January 28, 1971. It is the first and oldest Omani newspaper. Alwatan has a daily circulation of 40,000, as of 2007.

== History ==
Alwatan was founded in 1971, becoming the first Omani newspaper. It was first published on January 28, 1971. Alwatan was planned to be a daily newspaper but due to printing challenges it was published on a weekly basis in Beirut, Lebanon. The newspaper's editor-in-chief at the time was Nasr Ibn Mohammed al-Taei. It ceased publication and moved to Cairo, Egypt, after the Lebanese Civil War; it later moved to Kuwait City, Kuwait.

When Mohammed Ibn Suleiman al-Taei became editor-in-chief, he immediately started planning to expand and make Alwatan a daily newspaper. He hired more journalists, and changed the newspaper's display and organization. On January 28, 1984, Alwatan became a daily newspaper. In August 1988, Alwatan founded their own publishing establishment in Oman, where the newspaper is still being published. Alwatan published its first issue from Oman on August 26, 1988.

In 1996, Alwatan switched to the broadsheet format and set its slogan. On July 18, 1997, Alwatan launched its Internet website and service, providing readers access to its articles. In 1999, Alwatan changed to glossy paper, and became the first newspaper to use this type of paper in Oman. In 2001, Alwatan increased the number of the newspaper's pages and added new sections to celebrate the newspaper's 30th anniversary.

Alwatan has been credited with the improvement of Omani arts and sports and is considered the only reliable source for the history of sports in Oman. Alwatan has deployed journalists in the capital cities of all the major Arab and Western countries. As of 2007, Alwatan has 187 employees and is the best-selling newspaper in Oman.

== Sections ==
The Alwatan newspaper currently has 20 pages. It started out with 12 pages, and the number of pages has increased steadily until it reached 20 in 2001. Below is information on the content of every page.

- Page 1 is the front page of the newspaper and includes the main news headlines of the day, both local and international.
- Pages 2 to 4 include news stories on Oman, major local news and current affairs. Page 4 also includes weather forecasts.
- Pages 5 and 6 include business news.
- Pages 7 to 10 include sports news, both local and international.
- Pages 11 and 12 are considered to be the varieties sections. Page 11's content differs from day to day; for example it is usual that on Saturdays readers' poems are posted, while on Thursdays the page includes information on a touristic location. Readers' opinions and advertisements are published on page 12.
- Page 13 usually includes literature-related columns. Page 14 includes celebrity, television and cinema news.
- Pages 15 to 16 comprise the "Opinions" section and contain editorials on current affairs and Omani and international politics. It also includes a daily caricature. On some days, page 16 will include advertisements.
- Pages 17 to 19 contain local and international news. The pages also contains regular columns written by well-known Arab writers.
- Page 20 includes light and trivial news.

== Management ==
Alwatan's editor-in-chief manages the policy of the newspaper and supervises its preparation. He is helped by a managing editor and a deputy managing editor. The newspaper's departments include:

- Local news department
- Political news department
- Sports news department
- Features department
- Secretary of editing
- Revision department
- Production department
- Archiving department
- Photography department

== See also ==
- List of newspapers in Oman

== Notes and references ==
=== Published sources ===
- Al-Abd, Atef (1995). دراسات في الإعلام العماني – Studies in the Omani Media. Dar al-Fikr al-Arabi.
- Farid, Samir (1989). وسائل وأساليب الاتصال في سلطنة عمان – Means and Methods of Communication in the Sultanate of Oman. Angelo Egyptian Library.
