= Al-Mutamar =

Daily newspaper issued by the Iraqi National Congress

Al Mutmar Newspaper جريدة المؤتمر
- Type: Daily newspaper
- Format: Print, online
- Owner: Iraqi National Congress
- Founded: 2007
- Political alignment: Centrism
- Language: Arabic
- Headquarters: Iraq
- Website: Official website

Al-Mutamar is a daily newspaper issued by the Iraqi National Congress. There has been some controversy after it was discovered that the United States was secretly paying Iraqi newspapers, including Al-Mutamar, to print possibly biased articles written by American troops and officials.

== See also ==
- List of newspapers in Iraq
