= Al Mustaqilla =

Al Mustaqilla (Arabic: الْمُسْتَقِلَّة, 'The Independent') was an Arabic-language bi-weekly newspaper published in Baghdad, Iraq.

== History and profile ==
Al Mustaqilla was launched after the removal of Saddam Hussein. Its editor-in-chief was Dhari Al Duleimi and the managing editor was Mu'ayyad Al Samsam.

The paper was ordered shut down by the Coalition Provisional Authority on 22 July 2003, after it was accused of publishing an article inciting readers to "commit murder." The managing editor was also arrested.

== See also ==
- Al Hawza
