= Iraqi News =

News service focused on Iraqi and Middle Eastern happenings

- Website type: News
- Available in: English
- Area served: Iraq, Middle East
- Website: www.iraqinews.com
- Advertising: Yes
- Commercial: Yes
- Registration: None
- Launched: 2000; 26 years ago
- Current status: Active

Iraqi News is an online English language news service focused on Iraqi and wider Middle Eastern events.

The site started in early 2000. Iraqi News has been referenced thousands of times by other news vendors.

== Ownership, identity and reliability ==
The site describes itself as private, and no ownership or management information is given on the site's About page. The Contact us page gives a Bahrain contact address. The ownership of the website domain name iraqinews.com, first registered in December 2000, is unpublished.

Individual reports are ascribed to named authors.
