= SOMA Digest =

English-written newspaper

- Front cover of SOMA Digest.
- Type: Weekly newspaper
- Publisher: Khak Press & Media Center
- Managing editor: Tanya Goudsouzian
- Political alignment: PUK
- Language: English
- Headquarters: Sulaymaniyah, Kurdistan Region, Iraq
- Circulation: 8,000

SOMA Digest was an English-language newspaper published in the Kurdistan Region of Iraq.

Launched on February 14, 2006, it was the first English-language publication of its kind to cater to the growing foreign presence in Iraq following the 2003 war.

The newspaper was issued fortnightly and distributed across Iraq, covering Kurdish and Iraqi affairs. In addition to analysis of regional topics, it featured interviews with leading officials and satirical commentary.

The name SOMA means "perspective" in Kurdish. The newspaper had a national circulation of 8,000 copies per issue. The name SOMA means "perspective" in Kurdish. It has The newspaper had a national circulation of 8,000 copies per issue.

SOMA Digest was established by Hero Ibrahim Ahmed, then First Lady of Iraq. It ceased publication in December 2010. Its managing editor was Tanya Goudsouzian.

== Current columnists and journalists ==
- Lawen Sagerma (Deputy Managing Editor)
- Lara Fatah (Deputy Managing Editor)
- Ari Anwar (Editorial Assistant)
- Dr. Sherko Abdullah (Columnist)
- Darya Ibrahim (Graphic Designer)
- Aram Eissa (Photographer)
- Anwar M. Qaradaghi (Copy Editor)
- Agri Ismail (Columnist)
- Dr. Joseph Kechichian (Columnist)
- Raz Jabary
- Zheno Abdulla
- Jalal Ahmed
- Noman Abdurrahman Ali
- Iason Athanasiadis
- Roj Bahjat
- Karokh Bahjat
- Linda Berglund
- Ilnur Cevik
- Troy Davis
- Jonathan Dworkin
- Dr. Rebwar Fatah
- Pat Gaffney
- Basit Gharib
- Dr. Harry Hagopian
- Dana Hameed
- Dr. Albert Issa
- Fakhri Karim
- Ali Kurdistani
- Ibrahim Al Marashi
- Mohamed Karim Mohamed
- Hawre Daro Noori
- Shadman Janab Noori
- Jamal Penjweny
- Asoz Latif Rashid
- Bakhtiar Sabir
- Qubad Talabani
- Ranj Talabany
- Awat Abdullah
- Hazhar Mohammed
- Galawizh H. Rashid
- Ako Gharib

== Soma Digest on YouTube ==
On January 1, 2010, SOMA Digest launched its online video channel on YouTube, thus aiming to spread its voice to a wider range of fans through the use of short pieces of viewing material.
