= Al Iraqiya =

Iraqi television network

Al-Iraqiya
- Type: Satellite television network
- Country: Iraq
- First air date: 23 April 2003; 23 years ago
- Availability: International
- Headquarters: Baghdad
- Owner: Iraqi Government
- Launch date: 2003; 23 years ago
- Former names: Iraqi TV
- Official website: imn.iq
- Language: Arabic, Kurdish, Turkmen, Neo-Aramaic
- Replaced: Baghdad Television (Ba'athist Iraq Era) (1956–2003)

Al Iraqiya (Arabic: العراقيّة, romanized: Al-ʻIrāqīyah) is an Iraqi state-owned satellite and terrestrial public broadcaster and television network. The channel is part of the larger Iraqi Media Network, and was set up after the 2003 invasion of Iraq and the ousting of Saddam Hussein. It is primarily an Arabic language network that serves upwards of 85% of Iraq's population, and is viewed by a significant percentage (about 40%). The channel currently broadcasts in the Arabic, Kurdish, Turkmen, and Neo-Aramaic languages and dialects.

== History ==
The Iraqi Media Network, which manages the channel, was created in 2004 as a successor to Ba'ath-run media. The channel began under the name IMN as part of the Iraqi Media Network (شبكة الإعلام العراقي) project undertaken. The Science Applications International Corporation (SAIC) was the contractor for this Defense Department project. The channel received funding from the U.S. government and played a major role in reporting news surrounding the 2003 invasion of Iraq, including the execution of Saddam Hussein.

On 31 May 2006, Ali Jaafar, a sports anchorman for the channel, was killed in Baghdad by unidentified gunmen. It's believed that he was killed due to his affiliation with the channel, which was supported by the U.S. government at the time.

Included in the programming was the very aggressive Political Actuality program "Burning Issues" that tackles the very sensitive subject of terrorism in Iraq, hosting both the victims and the arrested/convicted perpetrators.

In 2015, the channel was upgraded to high-definition television thanks to a partnership with Imagine Communications, and two channels (Al Iraqiya News and Al Iraqiya Turkmen) were upgraded. In the same year, a law was passed that classified the channel as part of the legal framework of Iraq and the Council of Representatives. Harris Corporation took over the project from SAIC and completed—on time and in budget—two TV channels, a national newspaper, and radio stations.

In 2020, the then-director of Al Iraqiya, Haidar Hassan Obeid, was dismissed from his position and was replaced by Abbas Hamzouz Jakhyour.

On the eve of Kha b-Nisan in 2023, the head of IMN, Nabil Jassim, announced the launch of a new channel for Al Iraqiya that would broadcast in both Classical Syriac and contemporary Neo-Aramaic dialects. Jassim stressed the importance of opening the channel as one that would unite all the ethnic components of Iraq, and celebrated the opening of the channel as the first of its kind in the Arab world. The ceremony was attended by Minister Evan Faiq Jabro, as well as Greek Orthodox Priest Younan Al-Farid and a delegation of the General Directorate of Syriac Studies from the Kurdish region. Other officials and guests in attendance congratulated the network and the people involved on the launch, expressing their enthusiasm and the importance of maintaining the rich history of the region through the language.

The opening of the channel was not only hailed by people in Iraq, but observers outside of the country, especially the Assyrian diaspora. In an interview with The World, Jack Anwia, director of the channel, discussed the importance of the channel and its role in preserving Classical Syriac and other components of the larger Syriac language. The article also mentioned that there were currently 40 people working on the channel, and that they had an array of programs hosted that covered news and other topics.

In September 2024, the channel released an interview with Assyrian singer Evin Agassi, in light of his death around the same time.

== Criticism ==
The channel and the Iraqi Media Network have been criticized for their alleged sectarian nature. The Media and Journalism Research Center noted that a majority of the board members of IMN, who controls the channel, were affiliated with Iran-backed militant groups, and those who publicly criticize the Iraqi government risk losing their jobs within the organization. In 2023, three new board members were elected, each having ties to Ketaib Hezbollah, Harakat Hezbollah al-Nujaba, and the Babylon Brigade. The majority presence of board members affiliated with these organizations has been linked to Rayan al-Kildani, who pushes issues relating to the organizations amongst them.

After the Fall of Mosul and the beginning of the War against the Islamic State, the channel began pushing symbols and slogans notable to Shia Muslims, while discussing the many damages that Iraqi military commanders had made against Sunni Muslim militants. Observers noted how the change in graphics on Al Iraqiya, as well as pro-Sunni channels, reflected the sectarian divide between Sunnis and Shias post-2003.

In 2019, in the wake of the Tishreen Movement, protestors closed the stations of the channel in the Maysan Governorate of southeastern Iraq. The studio closure followed previous attempts to close down studios in Dhi Qar, due to objections over the channel's coverage of the protests. Two journalists who posted about the protests on social media were also prevented from receiving their wages, and were also subjected to interrogation by an inner committee. The latter reflected the ever-growing tension against journalists during the protests, and the level of press freedom in Iraq.

In the same year, the channel was also criticized for filming an interview with a former Yezidi sex slave, Ashwaq Haji Hamid, and a former ISIS member, Abu Hamam. Independent observers in Germany believed that the interview took more focus away from the victim than the perpetrator, and that the confrontation could re-open the traumatic memories for the victim.

== Affiliated media ==
Al Iraqiya, as part of the Iraqi Media Network, is also affiliated with other news outlets, ranging from television to print media:

- Al Sabaah
- Iraqi News Agency
- Radio Republic of Iraq
- Al Iraqiyah Sports
- Al Iraqiyah News
- IMN Magazine

== See also ==
- Television in Iraq
