= Hawlati =

Kurdish newspaper

Hawlati ھاووڵاتی
- Type: Bi-weekly newspaper
- Owner: Tariq Fatih
- Publisher: Ranj Publishing House
- Editor: Kamal Rauf
- Political alignment: Left-wing
- Language: Kurdish
- Headquarters: Sulaymaniyah, Iraqi Kurdistan (Kurdistan Region)
- Website: Official website

Hawlati (Kurdish for "citizen") is an independent Kurdish newspaper, published in Sulaymaniyah, Iraqi Kurdistan and London. Tariq Fatih is the owner of the paper.

Hawlati is a biweekly newspaper issued by Ranj Publishing House, published on Sundays and Wednesdays. The current editor is Kamal Rauf. The newspaper first appeared on 5 November 2000. The BBC referred to the launch of Hawlati as the birth of independent media in Iraq. One of the founders, Asos Hardi, is the son of the Kurdish poet Ahmad Hardi. Hawlati claims to be the first independent newspaper in the region since the fall of Saddam Hussein. To prove its transparency, the paper made a point of publishing its quarterly financial reports in the paper itself. The paper also had to cope with the lack of professional journalists in Iraq. The London edition was launched in April 2009.

Hawlati is one of two independent newspapers in Iraqi Kurdistan - the other is Awene, which was established by a number of journalists, including Hardi, after their split from Hawlati. The newspaper’s independent stance has frequently brought it into trouble with the authorities. In 2008, the former editor, Abad Arif, was arrested and released on bail after a suit bought by Iraqi President Jalal Talabani for an article in the newspaper alleging corruption in the Iraqi Government. He received a heavy fine for this article.

In 2008 Hawlati was voted the most popular newspaper in Iraqi Kurdistan.
