= Awena =

- Type: Weekly newspaper
- Format: Print, online
- Founder: Asos Ahmed Hardi
- Publisher: Awena (Mirror) Company
- Founded: 2006
- Political alignment: Independent
- Language: Kurdish

Awena (Kurdish: ئاوێنە) is a weekly independent Kurdish newspaper, published every Tuesday in Sulaymaniyah, Iraqi Kurdistan .

Awena means “The Mirror” in Kurdish. The newspaper was founded by Asos Ahmed Hardi, former editor-in-chief of Hawlati after he clashed with the owner of Hawlati and resigned. Hardi is the director of the Awena (Mirror) Company, which publishes Awena. It began publication in January 2006. Hardi took most of his team with him from Hawlati.

In 2008, Suzanne Fischer of the Institute for War and Peace Reporting, was quoted as saying that Awena was the only truly independent newspaper in Iraqi Kurdistan, since it was the only one to have explained its business model. Investigative journalist Sherwan Sherwani previously wrote for the newspaper before setting up his own magazine in 2011.

In 2009, the daily reported a circulation of 17,000.
