= List of television stations in West Asia =

This is a list of television stations in West Asia.

== Armenia ==
- A21TV (Armenia)
- Armenia 2
- Armenia TV
- Armnews TV
- Hrazdan TV
- Kentron TV
- Public Television Company of Armenia
- Shant TV
- Shoghakat TV

== Azerbaijan ==
- AzTV
- Cartoon Network
- İdman Azərbaycan
- İTV
- Mədəniyyət TV

== Cyprus ==
- Alpha TV Cyprus
- ANT1 Cyprus
- Boomerang
- Cartoon Network
- Disney Channel
- Cyprus Broadcasting Corporation
- MAD TV (Cypriot TV channel)
- MTV Greece
- Nickelodeon Greece
- Nick Jr. Greece
- Omega TV Cyprus
- Plus TV (Cyprus)
- RIK 1
- RIK 2
- Sigma TV

== Georgia ==
- Adjarasport
- First Channel (Georgian TV channel)
- Imedi Media Holding
- Maestro TV
- Mze TV
- Rustavi 2
- Second Channel (Georgian TV Channel)
- TV Sakartvelo
- TV XXI

== Iraq ==
- Afaq TV
- Al TV
- Asia Network Television
- Baghdad Satellite Channel
- Cartoon Network Arabic
- Disney Channel
- Dijlah TV
- HadiTV
- Ishtar TV
- Kanal4
- Karbala TV
- Kurdish News Network
- Kurdistan TV
- Music Al Remas TV
- MTV
- Nickelodeon
- Nick Jr.
- NickToons
- NRT News
- Rudaw Media Network
- Samarra TV
- Türkmeneli TV
- Vîn TV
- Zagros TV
- Zaro tv

== Israel ==
- Arutz HaYeladim
- Channel 9
- Channel 12
- Channel 13
- Channel 20
- Channel 24
- Disney Channel
- Ego
- Hop! Channel
- Hot 3
- Hot Comedy Central
- I24 News
- Israeli Educational Television
- Israeli Network
- Kan
- Knesset Channel
- Makan 33
- Musawa (Israel/Palestine)
- Nickelodeon
- Nick Jr.
- Teddy Channel
- Yes Action
- Yes Base
- Yes Comedy
- Yes Drama
- Yes Oh
- Yes Stars HD

== Bahrain, Jordan, Kuwait, Oman, Qatar, Saudi Arabia, United Arab Emirates ==
- MTV Arabia
- Cartoon Network Arabic
- Disney Channel
- Nickelodeon
- Nick Jr.
- NickToons

== Lebanon ==
- MTV (Lebanon)
- Cartoon Network Arabic
- Disney Channel
- Nickelodeon
- Nick Jr.
- NickToons

== See also ==
- Lists of television channels
- List of Arabic-language television channels
- List of television stations in Central Asia
- List of television stations in Southeast Asia
- List of television stations in South Asia
- List of television stations in East Asia
