= Television in Iraq =

Iraq was home to the first television station in the Middle East, which began during the 1950s. As part of a plan to help Iraq modernize, British telecommunications company Pye Limited built and commissioned a television broadcast station in the capital city of Baghdad. Following the 2003 US-led invasion of Iraq, the Iraqi state media collapsed. In June 2004, a Communications and Media Commission was set up to approve and grant license for all the country's media. By 2011, Iraq was the headquarters of 49 free-to-air satellite channels, one of the highest numbers in the region. Until 2003, satellite dishes were banned in Iraq, and there was a limited number of national terrestrial stations. After 2003, the sale of satellite dishes surged, and free-to-air channels entered the market. There are 17 terrestrial channels, of which one is funded by the US government through the U.S. Agency for Global Media (Alhurra-Iraq), and seven are owned by the state broadcaster Iraqi Media Network. In March 2011, Al Jazeera was granted rights to resume operations after being banned in 2004. Plans were established to set up a free-media zone based in Baghdad, the Baghdad Media City, by the end of 2014.

== History ==
=== 1956-2003 ===
Television first arrived in Iraq on 2 May 1956, at first only in the Baghdad area with a station named Baghdad Television on channel 8, switching to channel 9 in November 1959 after an increasing of its power. On 18 November 1967 the second TV station opened in Kirkuk, on 2 March 1968 a new transmitter had been opened in Mosul and on 6 November 1968 in Basrah. On 30 July 1972 Baghdad Television opened its second TV station on channel 7, and in 1974 two new stations opened in Amarah (capital city of the Maysan Governorate) and Samawah (capital city of the Muthanna Governorate), the latter one opening in March. In July 1976 colour television was introduced using the French SECAM system. By 1976 the entire country could receive broadcasts from the central station in Baghdad after the installation of a microwave relay system.

Baghdad Television was the primary TV station in Iraq while Saddam Hussein was in power. Until the 2003 invasion of Iraq, much of its programming was patriotic music videos, government news and propaganda. It ceased broadcasting during the 2003 invasion when the transmitter network became inoperable due to bombing raids.

A second TV channel was established on 30 July 1972 broadcasting on channel 7 in the Baghdad area. The channel was renamed Youth Channel (Qanaat Al-Shabaab) on 17 July 1993 and broadcast subtitled Western movies and music videos before the 2003 invasion. Foreign programmes were censored to remove strong language, sex and violence so programming would be suitable for all ages. Other channels available included Baghdad Cultural TV, Al-Shabaab 2 and Iraq Satellite Channel.

Because BTV was free to air, it also received a substantial amount of attention from viewers outside Iraq, particularly during the 2003 invasion of the country.

=== 2003-present ===
Many TV stations have appeared since the fall of Saddam. Under the direction of Ambassador L. Paul Bremer III as the Administrator, the Coalition Provisional Authority (CPA) began issuing radio and television licenses in June 2003 to meet the great demand for broadcasting licenses. The licenses were issued by the CPA Senior Adviser for Telecommunications. To plan for the expected great demand, this CPA office worked with Iraqi radio-frequency spectrum engineers and managers to develop a national FM-radio and TV channel allotment plan for all of the major Iraqi cities and towns. The national plan was developed using technical criteria and the Region 1 (Europe, Africa and the Middle East) allotment plan that was developed years before by the International Telecommunication Union (ITU), a United Nations treaty organization. The Iraqi allotment plan consisted of hundreds of FM radio and TV stations allotted to the cities and towns. The channels in the allotment plan were then open to anyone to apply for a license for a particular channel.

The CPA developed a few basic rules and regulations in June and July 2003 to provide a limited regulatory control of the broadcasters. For example, broadcasts inciting riots were prohibited. The overall CPA objective was to issue many licenses to provide for a plethora of diverse voices, information, music, and news to satisfy the desires and tastes of the Iraqi citizens. The CPA also recognized that broadcasting was a combination of business, advertising, journalism, engineering, and entertainment, and a robust and thriving broadcasting industry could provide a large number of excellent and highly desirable professional jobs that would reduce national unemployment. The CPA also recognized that commercial broadcasting could provide wealth-building opportunities to successful broadcasters.

The Iraqi Media Network (IMN), a public broadcasting network similar to the Public Broadcasting System in the United States, was issued radio and TV licenses by the CPA.

The CPA continued its work as the national broadcasting licensing and regulatory authority until June 2004 when the Iraq Communications and Media Commission (CMC) was established as the national regulatory agency that would issue licenses and regulate broadcasting and telecommunications.

In August 2014, LANA TV a new general entertainment channel started broadcasting regional series dubbed in Iraqi dialect. This is the first time that a TV Channel is broadcasting high quality Iraqi dubbing. LANA TV has hired Iraq's top theatre actors and actress such as Ustad Sami Qeftan to train the dubbing artists.

The overall result is that there are hundreds of radio and television stations operating in Iraq.

== List of channels ==
=== (Kurdistan Region) ===
| Channel | Category | Owner/Political Party |
|---|---|---|---|---|---|---|
| 4 Chra | | | Yes |
| Afarin Kids TV | Kids | Afarin Company | Yes | Yes | Yes | Yes |
| ACE Kids | Kids | | Yes |
| ACE Music | Music | | Yes |
| ACE Movies | Cinema, Film | | Yes |
| All Doc HD | Documentary | | Yes |
| All Sport HD | Sport | | Yes |
| Amozhgary | Religious | | Yes | Yes |
| Ankawa HD | | | Yes |
| Art Tv | | | Yes |
| Asman HD | | | Yes |
| ASO Sport Tv | Sport | | Yes |
| Astera HD | | | Yes | Yes | Yes |
| Astera Baby | Kids | | No | Yes | Yes |
| Astera Documentary | Documentary | | No | Yes | Yes |
| Astera Movies | Cinema, Film | | No | Yes | Yes |
| Astera Music | Music | | No | Yes | Yes |
| Astera Show | | | No | Yes | Yes |
| Astera Sport | Sport | | No | Yes | Yes |
| AUC1 Kurdistan TV | Business | | No |
| AUC2 Kurdistan TV | Business | | No |
| Azadi Tv | | | Yes |
| BabyPanda HD | Kids | | No | | Yes |
| Bangawaz | Religious | | Yes | Yes |
| Best HD | | | | | Yes |
| Biaban HD | | | Yes |
| Biaban Family HD | | | Yes |
| Biaban Movies HD | Cinema, Film | | Yes |
| Biaban Music HD | Music | | Yes |
| Biaban Sport HD | Sport | | Yes |
| Bablyon TV | English Music | | Yes |
| Badinan TV | | | No |
| Business Media Channel (BMC) | Business | | Yes |
| Chara HD | | | Yes | | Yes |
| Cihan HD | | | Yes |
| Dahen Tv | | | Yes | Yes | Yes |
| Delal TV | | | Yes |
| Democracy HD | General | | Yes | | Yes |
| Derwaze HD | | | Yes |
| DUHOK | | | Yes |
| Effect HD | | | Yes |
| ESTA | | | Yes |
| Falcon Eye HD | | | Yes |
| Falcon Family HD | | | Yes |
| Gali Kurdistan | | Patriotic Union of Kurdistan | Yes |
| Gali Kurdistan Slemani | | Patriotic Union of Kurdistan | Yes |
| Gali Kurdistan Sport | Sport | Patriotic Union of Kurdistan | Yes |
| Gali Kurdistan Hawler | | Patriotic Union of Kurdistan | Yes | | Yes |
| GEM KURD | General | | No |
| Hawler TV | | | No |
| Hettaw TV | | | No |
| iBaby HD | Kids | | Yes | | Yes |
| iMovies HD | Cinema, Film | | Yes | | Yes |
| Jamawari Kurdistan HD | | Kurdistan Socialist Democratic Party | Yes |
| Jojo Mama | Kids | | Yes | | Yes |
| JSN HD | | | Yes |
| Judi | | | Yes | | Yes |
| Kurdistan K24 | News, Documentary | Kurdistan Democratic Party; Masrour Barzani | Yes | Yes | Yes | Yes |
| Kanal4 | | | No |
| Kirkuk TV | General | Patriotic Union of Kurdistan | Yes |
| KOMALL HD | Religious | | Yes | Yes | Yes |
| Korek TV | Music | | Yes | Yes |
| Kurd Shop | Shopping | | No |
| Kurd Sport TV | Sport | Patriotic Union of Kurdistan | No |
| Kurdistan Sport HD | Sport | | Yes |
| Kurd1 Channel | | | No |
| Kurdish News Network (KNN) | News | Gorran Movement | Yes |
| Kurdistan Parliament TV | Government | Kurdistan Regional Government | No |
| Kurdistan TV | General | Kurdistan Democratic Party | Yes |
| Kurdmax | | | Yes | Yes |
| Kurdmax Music | Music | | No | Yes |
| Kurdmax Show | | | Yes | Yes |
| Kurdmax Pepule | Kids | | Yes | Yes |
| Kurdsat | General | Patriotic Union of Kurdistan | Yes |
| Kurdsat News | News | Patriotic Union of Kurdistan | Yes |
| LAWAN HD | | | Yes | | Yes |
| Live Dream | Marketing | HD Box | No | No | Yes | No |
| MaxTV | Music | | Yes |
| MINARA | | | Yes | | Yes |
| Net TV | General | Aramo Media | Yes | Yes |
| New Art | | | No |
| Newline 1 | | | Yes | Yes | Yes | Yes |
| Newline 2 | | | Yes | Yes | Yes | Yes |
| Newline Bollywood | | | No | Yes | | No |
| Newline Kids | Kids | | No | Yes | | No |
| Newline Movies | Cinema, Film | | No | Yes | | No |
| Niga Family HD | | | Yes | | Yes |
| Niga Kids | Kids | | Yes | | Yes |
| Niga Movies | Cinema, Film | | Yes | | Yes |
| NIROJ TV | | | No |
| Nishtimani MN HD | | | Yes | | Yes |
| NRT News | News | New Generation Movement; Shaswar Abdulwahid Qadir | Yes | Yes |
| NRT2 | General | New Generation Movement; Shaswar Abdulwahid Qadir | Yes | Yes |
| NRT3 | Kids | New Generation Movement; Shaswar Abdulwahid Qadir | Yes | Yes |
| NRT4 | Religious | New Generation Movement; Shaswar Abdulwahid Qadir | Yes | Yes |
| ntv Drama | | | Yes |
| Payam Tv | Religious | Kurdistan Islamic Group | Yes | Yes |
| Pelistank TV | Kids | | Yes |
| Parwarda | Education | | Yes |
| Qalat Tv | | | Yes |
| Rangin TV | | | No |
| Rasan | | | Yes | | Yes |
| Rebari | | | No |
| Rega | Political | Communist Party of Kurdistan | No |
| Reklam 4u | Marketing | | No |
| Reng (TV channel) | | | Yes | | Yes |
| Reng Documentary | Documentary | | Yes | | Yes |
| Reng Kids | Kids | | Yes |
| Reng Music | Music | | Yes |
| Rudaw | News, Documentary | Kurdistan Democratic Party; Nechirvan Barzani | Yes | Yes | Yes | Yes |
| Silemani Tv | | | Yes |
| Speda TV | Religious | Kurdistan Islamic Union | Yes |
| Srusht | Religious | | Yes | Yes | Yes |
| Tueshw HD | | | Yes |
| U TV | Religious | Kurdistan Islamic Union | Yes | Yes | Yes |
| U2 Channel | Religious | Kurdistan Islamic Union | Yes | Yes | Yes |
| U TV Sulaimani | Religious | Kurdistan Islamic Union | Yes | | Yes |
| UMM | Marketing | United MixMedia | Yes | No | No | No |
| Vîn TV | Music | Sarkat Junad Rekani & Kawa Junad Rekani | No |
| WAAR TV | General | Palo Co. | Yes | Yes | Yes | Yes |
| Xak Movies | Cinema, Film | Patriotic Union of Kurdistan | Yes |
| Xak Music | Music | Patriotic Union of Kurdistan | Yes |
| Xezan HD | Music | | No | | Yes |
| Zagros TV | General | Kurdistan Democratic Party | Yes | Yes |
| Zaro tv | Government, Kids | Kurdistan Regional Government | No |
| Zarok TV (Based in Turkey) | Kids | | No |

=== (Rest of Iraq) ===
| Channel | Category | Owner/Political Party | Broadcaster |
|---|---|---|---|
| Al Anwar TV 2 | Religious |
| Al Hurra Iraq | News | United States |
| Radio Sawa | General | United States |
| Aletejah TV | News, Political | Kata'ib Hezbollah |
| Al Iraqiya | News | Republic of Iraq |
| Al Iraqiya Business | Business | Republic of Iraq |
| Al Iraqiya Educational | Educational | Republic of Iraq |
| Al Iraqiya Aramaic | General | Republic of Iraq |
| Al Iraqiya Turkmen | General | Republic of Iraq |
| Al Iraqiya Kurd | General | Republic of Iraq |
| Al Iraqiya Sports | Sports | Republic of Iraq |
| Al Falluja TV | General | Khamis Al-Khanjar |
| Al Sharqiya | General | Saad al-Bazzaz |
| Al Sumaria | General | Businessmen |
| Al Baghdadia TV | General | Awn Al Khashlok |
| Al Forat | News | Ammar al-Hakim |
| Al Rasheed TV | General | Saad Asem Al-Janabi |
| Al Rafidain TV | News, Political |
| Al Remas TV | Music |
| Ashur TV | | Assyrian Democratic Movement |
| Afaq TV | | Nuri al-Maliki |
| Anbar TV | General | Al-Anbar Governorate |
| Aghanina TV | Music |
| iNEWS TV | News |
| Nawa TV |
| Biladi | | Ibrahim Al-Jaafari |
| Baghdad TV |
| Dijla TV | General | Jamal Al-Karboli |
| Ahlulbayt TV | Religious |
| Al Masar |
| Al Fayha |
| Ishtar TV | General | Chaldean Syriac Assyrian Popular Council |
| Babylon TV | General |
| LANA TV |
| Mosul TV | General | Ghazi Faisal |
| Asia Network Television | General |
| Karbala TV | Religious |
| Alahad TV | News, Religious | Asa'ib Ahl al-Haq |
| Hadi TV | | Hadi Foundation |
| Iraq 24 Television | Business | Ali Wayieh |
| MBC Iraq | General | MBC Group |
| UTV | General | Sarmad Al Khanjar |
| Turkmeneli TV | General | Turkmen Front |
| Shabab Sports | Sports | Businessmen |
| Samarra TV | General | Businessmen |
| Sama Al Mosul | General | Businessmen |
| Saladin TV | General | Saladin Governorate |

== See also ==
- Cinema of Iraq
- Rotana Cinema
