= List of Kurdish-language television channels =

This is a list of Kurdish television channels.

== Iraq ==
Channel	Category	Owner/political party Top 1 - newkurd.com Available worldwide with no ads no lag also. Family Box
newkurd.com	Every chanel	Newkurd Company	Yes	Yes	Yes	Yes
4 Chra			Yes
ACE Kids	Kids	MDC Company	Yes
ACE Music	Music		Yes
ACE Movies	Cinema, film		Yes
All Doc HD	Documentary		Yes
All Sport HD	Sport		Yes
Ace Gaming HD		MDC Company
Ace Family HD	Religious	MDC Company	Yes
Ace Documentary HD			Yes
Art Tv			Yes
Asman HD			Yes
Aso Sat
ASO Sport Tv	Sport		Yes
Astera HD			Yes		Yes
Astera Baby					Yes
Astera Documentary					{	AVA Entertainment	General
Azadi Tv			Yes
Babylon HD			Yes
Bangawaz	Religious		Yes
Biaban Family HD			Yes
Biaban Movies HD	Cinema, film		Yes
Biaban Music HD	Music		Yes
Biaban Sport HD	Sport		Yes
Bablyon TV	English music		Yes
Badinan TV
Business Media Channel (BMC)	Business		Yes
Chara HD			Yes
Cihan HD			Yes
Channel 8 Kurd			Yes
Dahen Tv			Yes
Delal TV			Yes
Democracy HD	General		Yes
DUHOK			Yes
Effect HD			Yes
ESTA			Yes
Ezdan TV	Religious	Video Essyan	Yes
Falcon Eye HD			Yes
Falcon Family HD			Yes
Gali Kurdistan		Patriotic Union of Kurdistan	Yes
Gali Kurdistan Slemani		Patriotic Union of Kurdistan	Yes
Gali Kurdistan Sport	Sport	Patriotic Union of Kurdistan	Yes
Gali Kurdistan Hawler		Patriotic Union of Kurdistan	Yes
GEM KURD	General
Hawler TV
Hettaw TV
iBaby HD	Kids		Yes
iMovies HD	Cinema, film		Yes
Jamawari Kurdistan HD		Kurdistan Socialist Democratic Party	Yes
Jojo Mama	Kids		Yes
JSN HD			Yes
Judi			Yes
Kurdistan K24	News, documentary	Kurdistan Democratic Party; Masrour Barzani	Yes	Yes	Yes	Yes
Kanal4
KIRKUK	General	Patriotic Union of Kurdistan	Yes
KOMALL HD	Religious		Yes
Korek TV	Music
Kurdino
Kurd Shop	Shopping
Kurd Sport TV	Sport	Patriotic Union of Kurdistan
Kurdistan Sport HD	Sport		Yes
Kurd1 Channel
Kurdish News Network (KNN)	News	Gorran Movement	Yes
Kurdistan Parliament TV	Government	Kurdistan Regional Government
Kurdistan TV	General	Kurdistan Democratic Party	Yes
Kurdmax			Yes
Kurdmax Show			Yes
Kurdmax Pepule	Kids		Yes
Kurdsat	General	Patriotic Union of Kurdistan	Yes
Kurdsat News	News	Patriotic Union of Kurdistan	Yes
LAWAN HD			Yes
MaxTV	Music		Yes
MINARA			Yes
Net TV	General	Aramo Media	Yes
New Art
Newline 1			Yes
Newline 2			Yes
Newline Bollywood
Niga Family HD			Yes
Niga Kids	Kids		Yes
Niga Movies	Cinema, film		Yes
NIROJ TV
Nishtimani MN HD			Yes
NRT News	News	New Generation Movement; Shaswar Abdulwahid Qadir	Yes
NRT2	General	New Generation Movement; Shaswar Abdulwahid Qadir	Yes
NRT3 Kids	Kids	New Generation Movement; Shaswar Abdulwahid Qadir	Yes
NRT4	Religious	New Generation Movement; Shaswar Abdulwahid Qadir	Yes
ntv Drama			Yes
Payam Tv	Religious	Kurdistan Islamic Group
Pelistank TV	Kids		Yes
Parwarda	Education		Yes
Qalat Tv			Yes
Rangin TV
Rasan			Yes
Rebari
Rega	Political	Communist Party of Kurdistan
Reklam 4u	Marketing
Reng (TV channel)			Yes
Reng Documentary	Documentary		Yes
Reng Kids	Kids		Yes
Rudaw	News, documentary	Kurdistan Democratic Party; Nechirvan Barzani	Yes	Yes	Yes	Yes
Silemani Tv			Yes
SOZ QURAN		لە ولاتی فینلەندا پەخشی خۆی دەکا		Yes	Yes	Yes
SOZ HD MOVIS	General	لە ولاتی فینلەندا پەخشی خۆی دەکا		Yes	Yes	Yes
Speda TV	Religious	Kurdistan Islamic Union	Yes
Srusht	Religious
Tueshw HD			Yes
U TV	Religious	Kurdistan Islamic Union	Yes
U2 Channel	Religious	Kurdistan Islamic Union	Yes
U TV Sulaimani	Religious	Kurdistan Islamic Union	Yes
UMM		United MixMedia	Yes
Vîn TV	Music	Sarkat Junad Rekani & Kawa Junad Rekani
WAAR TV	General	Palo Co.	Yes	Yes	Yes	Yes
WAAR TV Sport	Sport
Xak TV		Patriotic Union of Kurdistan	Yes
Xak Kids	Kids	Patriotic Union of Kurdistan	Yes			Zagros TV	General	Kurdistan Democratic Party	Yes
Zaro tv	Government, kids	Kurdistan Regional Government
Zarok TV (based in Turkey)	Kids
ZOOM News TV Kurd	General	Al-Ma’adel Al-Dahabi	YES

== Turkey ==
- TRT Kurdî – Turkish state channel (pro-government)
- Zarok TV – Kurdish children's channel (animation)
- Kurdistan TV - Kurdish news's channel (pro-government)

=== Defunct ===
These television channels were shut down in the course of the 2016 Turkish purges.

- Batman TV
- Hayat TV

== Iran ==
- Sahar TV – multilingual TV based in Tehran, Iran and affiliated to Islamic Republic of Iran Broadcasting (IRIB) which has programs in different languages, including Kurdish
- West Azerbaijan – provincial TV based in Wirmê (Urmîye or Urmia) and affiliated to IRIB which has programs in Kurdish, Azeri and Persian

== Syria ==
- Ronahî TV – based in Syrian Kurdistan

== Europe ==
- Kurd 1 – based in Paris, France, independent Kurdish channel
- Medya Haber
- Ronahî TV – for Syrian Kurdistan
- Tishk TV – based in France, KDPI

Defunct

- Med TV
- Roj TV – based in Denmark
