= Chopy Fatah =

Kurdish singer (born 1983)

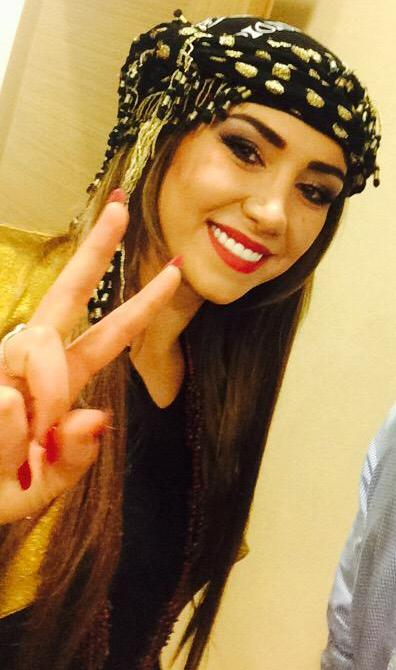
- Born: Chopy Shakir Fatah; June 10, 1983 (age 43); Kirkuk, Iraq
- Occupations: Singer-songwriter; TV host
- Spouse: Chato Fado (m. 2017)
- Musical career
- Genres: Kurdish music, World, Folk
- Instrument: Vocals
- Years active: 2000–present
- Website: http://www.chopy.krd/

Chopy Shakir Fatah (Sorani Kurdish: چۆپی شاکر فەتاح) (/tʃoʊpi/; born June 10, 1983) is a contemporary Kurdish singer.

== Career ==
Her family emigrated to the Netherlands in 1988. She released her debut album, Çît Naw Binêm, in 2003. After moving there, she joined a choir school in 1990 and a music school in 1996. There, she specialised in singing under the guidance of her teachers. In 1999, she studied at the Kurdish Music Academy in Germany with Wirya Ahmad. She performed on stage for the first time in The Hague in 2000. To date, Chopy has released five Kurdish music albums and three English singles: "Draw the Line", "My Homeland", and "Think of Me".

Chopy has been interviewed by many Kurdish and Iraqi newspapers and magazines, as well as by newspapers from Turkey (Habertürk), Dutch newspapers Algemeen Dagblad, NRC Next, Trouw, Nederlands Dagblad and the Italian weekly women's fashion and celebrity gossip magazine Grazia. The Dutch current affairs TV programmes EénVandaag and Goudmijn made reports about Chopy's life. She has also performed in Jörgen Raymanns TV show 'Zo Raymann' (Raymanns Suikerfeest).

In 2008, Chopy became the cultural ambassador for Asiacell Telecom. One of Iraq's leading telecommunications companies, Asiacell has over 9 million subscribers nationwide. Consequently, thousands of Chopy billboards were placed around Iraq.

She has performed in Germany, Sweden, the United Kingdom, the Netherlands, Norway, Austria, Greece, the United States, Canada, Australia, Ukraine and the United Arab Emirates. According to the Turkish newspaper Habertürk, she is one of the most famous Kurdish pop singers in Turkey, Iran, Iraq, Syria, Armenia and Azerbaijan. Thousands of her CDs have been sold around the world. She is well known across different parts of Kurdistan because she sings in both Sorani and Kurmanji Kurdish, which is a remarkable achievement. She has performed in various locations throughout Kurdistan, including Diyarbakır (Amed), Batman, Erbil (Hawler), Qamishlo, Sulaymaniyah and Van.

Chopy was one of the first singers to perform in the Iraqi city of Kirkuk after the fall off Saddam's dictatorship. Chopy stated that she did so because of her love for her hometown and her many fans (according to the Dutch newspaper Algemeen Dagblad). Many of Chopy Fatah's concerts and music events have been attended by important Iraqi and Kurdish politicians like the President of the Republic of Iraq, Jalal Talabani and the president of the Kurdistan Region, Massoud Barzani.

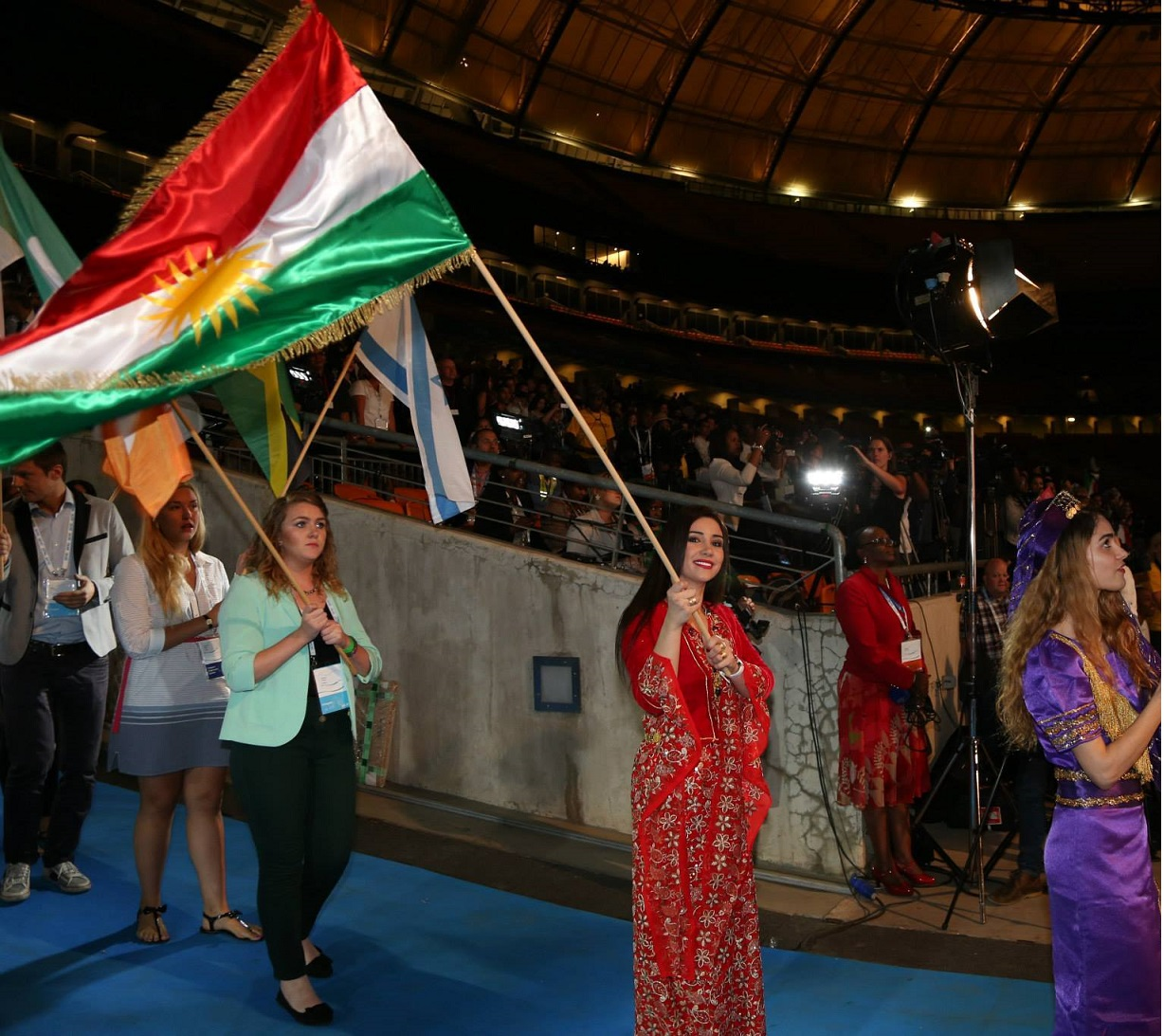
Chopy Fatah during the 'One Young World' summit 2013 in South Africa

Chopy supported in 2009 the Democratic Society Party DTP (the current BDP Peace and Democracy Party) by sending an official letter to its leader Ahmet Türk where she explained that she will do everything in her power to support the peaceful solution of the Kurdish issue in Turkey (North-Kurdistan). “As a Kurdish artist I want to show my support to the solution of the Kurdish question in North-Kurdistan (Southeast Turkey).” Chopy said she is willing to give free concerts in Diyarbakır (Amed), Cizîr, Batman and other cities to support peace. Chopy was one of the Kurdish singers that held concerts in Iraqi Kurdistan to raise money for the Kurdish victims of the Van earthquake that struck the city in southeastern Turkey in October 2011 (2011 Van earthquake). On 21 March 2013 she held a performance in the Turkish Kurdistani city of Diyarbakır (Amed) in front of 2 million people to support peace and freedom for the Kurds in Turkey.

In October 2013 Chopy was chosen to be the Kurdish flag bearer for the One Young World Summit' in Johannesburg, South Africa. The Kurdish flag was for the first time hoisted at the event, alongside flags of 190 other countries attending the summit.

== Advertisement ==
Chopy's music & advertisement videos are played on different TV channels in the Middle East:

- Qatar – Arabic : Al Jazeera
- Iraq – Arabic : Al Arabiya, Al Sharqiya, Al-Baghdadia TV, Al Iraqiya and Al Sumaria
- Iraq – Kurdish : Kurdistan TV, KurdSat, Kurdish News Network (KNN), Zagros TV, Gali Kurdistan, Kanal4, KOREK TV, VIN TV, Kurdmax, NRT2, Rudaw TV
- UAE – Arabic : Middle East Broadcasting Center (MBC)
- UAE – Persian : Persian Music Channel (PMC)
- Iran – Kurdish : TISHK TV, Rojhelat TV, KBC, Newroz TV, KLIK SAT, KOMALA TV
- Turkey – Kurdish : Roj TV, Sterk TV, MMC TV, TRT 6, Kurd1 Channel, Dünya TV,
- Lebanon and Egypt – Arabic : Melody Music
- Syria – Kurdish : Ronahî TV

== Discography ==
=== 2003 – Çît Naw Binêm ===
- 02. Siya Cemane
- 03. Legel Xem
- 04. Yara Min
- 05. Le Mehzunan
- 06. Xosewistekem
- 07. Hevala Min
- 08. Xemi Duri
- 09. Seydayi

=== 2007 – Nawit Denem Jino ===
- 01. Gwe Nagirim
- 02. Serbesti
- 03. Hedi Hedi
- 04. Bimbexse
- 05. Xak
- 06. Isqa Mezin
- 07. De Birro
- 08. Zistani Ruhh
- 09. Day Wele Nabe, Semame
- 10. Ere Bazo, Neki
- 11. Be Soz
- 12. Grftar
- 13. Kirkuk

=== 2010 – Crystal ===
- 01. Hewilmede
- 02. Kiristal
- 03. Be tu nagem
- 04. Disan
- 05. Eshqe diwar ninin
- 06. Meysharewe
- 07. Mire peyvan
- 08. Ho ew kesey

=== 2011 – Şara ===
- 01. Le Paş Mergim
- 02. Nemam
- 03. Lanik Jînan
- 04. Beqûrban
- 05. Sefer
- 06. Nemirdim Min
- 07. Ehmedî Mala Mûsa
- 08. Evînê
- 09. Le Derîyawe
- 10. Loy Nemayîme
- 11. Lawkê Metînê
- 12. Bûlbûl Exwênê

=== 2012 – Baran ===
- 01. Awir Dewe
- 02. Baran
- 03. Wenegir
- 04. Diltengiyekanim
- 05. Tirsi Mergawi
- 06. Rojgar
- 07. Yar
- 08. Xweneri Tenya
- 09. Diro
- 10. Baran (Unplugged Version)

=== 2017 – Bnar ===
- 01. To Siareki
- 02. Lem Ziz Mebe (Zana Remix)
- 03. Be Yadi Towe
- 04. Hat U Cu
- 05. Heqi Xote
- 06. Bot Nusiwm
- 07. Copi
- 08. Barana
- 09. Dem Ewareye
- 10. Tube Bit
- 11. Lem Ziz Mebe
- 12. Daya Gian (Dillin Hoox Collab)
- 13. Copi (Renas Miran Remix)

=== Singles ===
- 01. Think of me
- 02. Draw the line
- 03. My Homeland
