= Ali Zandi =

Kurdish musician (1956-2024)

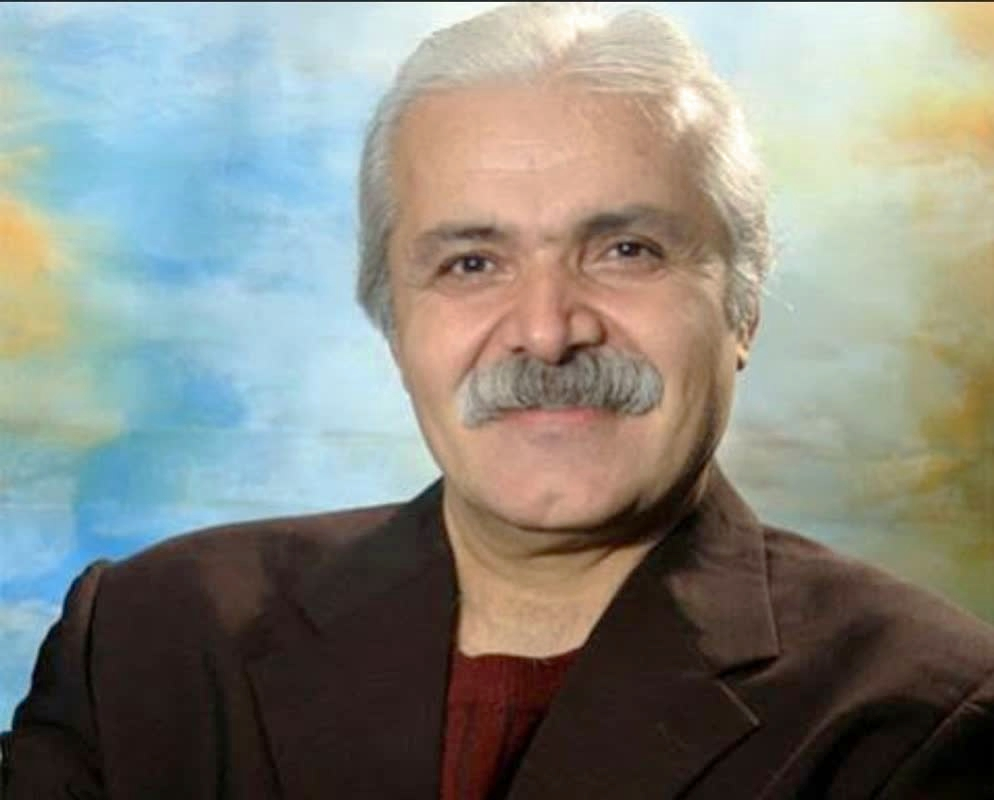

Background information
- Born: 1956; Sanandaj, Iran
- Died: 3 April 2024 (aged 67–68) Toronto, Canada
- Genre: Kurdish music
- Instruments: Bağlama
- Years active: 1980s-2024

Ali Zandi (Persian: علی زندی, Sorani Kurdish: عەلی زەندی; 1956 – 2024) was a famous traditional Kurdish singer and musician from Sna, Kurdistan province, Iran. Ali was born to a family from Sîâsarân village, and raised in the Âlawlâkh village, Leîlâkh area. He is famous for his impact on the Kurdish music by bringing the folk music of Leîlâkh to social media through live performance in Kurdsat, Kurdistan TV and Zagros TV as well as publishing several albums such as Nâlae Nîwashaw (mid-night cry) and Hâmed Alîjanî, an album in memory of less-known poet and Âref of Leîlâkh Hâmed Alîjani. There are also various tracks that have been recorded in family and friend gatherings singing pristine and unique folk melodies of Leîlâkh. He published more than 10 albums and a dozen of tracks with amateur recording.

== Early life and education ==
Ali Zandi was inspired by his father when reciting books in gatherings when many people were uneducated. He also found his interest through the sounds from nature. He was a classmate of Naser Razzazi and Najmaddin Gholami.

He received his diploma from the Bou-Ali High School in Sanandaj. During high school, he was living with their relatives as he was unable to have its own places, consequently many relatives were familiar with his thoughts and goals. Zandi was enthusiastic to pursue the higher education at university, and stated teacher-training program at Dânesh-sarâ. However, he was not miserably successful because it coincided with the Cultural Revolution in Iran when universities closed for almost three years (1980–1983) so that negatively affecting Ali's upcoming prospective.

== Artistic life and political issues ==
Ali continued his artistic life as a singer and singing trainer. He was one of the first singers to perform live concerts in a Kurdish City after Iranian Islamic Revolution. During 1986-2000 he was imprisoned several times as the poems of the songs were not in favor of local administrators and were considered as promotion of demonstration against the current regime. Ali was tortured specially in solitary cell by using multiple mock executions. He mostly resided in Sanandaj up to 2002 when he moved to Mahabad. However, owing to the cultural and political reasons, in both places, Ali had not sufficient income and always coped with economic challenges. Among the famous musicians who worked with Ali Zandi as instrumentalists and arrangers, were Anwar Gharadaghi, Rashid Fainezhad, Mozaffar Kamgar and Niaz Santoor. Ali believed that most of problem of Kurdish communities is due to cultural and educational poverty which is rooted from economic problem. He treated well and kindly with students and children and always encouraged them to study sciences and learn art specially music.

== Discography ==
=== Albums ===
Some of the most famous albums are as follows:

1. Album No. 1
2. Albom No. 2
3. Nâla-y nîwashaw
4. Dlôp dlôp
5. Kasê nâpərsê hâwârəm
6. Arê ay stâra-y âsmân
7. Yârân la jargəm
8. Awa bahâr hât
9. Har mən châwarwân niya qarârêm
10. Wara wara ay âyênəm
11. Gîrôda bê

=== Famous single tracks ===
1. Mama Korno
2. Gardoon Âmâne
3. Azîz Ba Gîâno
4. Hâmed Alîjanî
5. Shamâl Âmâne
6. Saghî Faryâdem
7. Bâwa Yâl
8. Nawroz
9. Tawnî Daka Kechî Kurd
10. Sâ Mâl Âwâ Âzîzakam
11. Wak Jaerânakân

== Death ==
Ali Zandi died of brain cancer on 3 April 2024 at the age of 67 after second brain surgery, when he had many hopes to be recovered. According to one of his close friends living in Iran, he went under one more surgery during 2020 while he was sure that the tumor was just begun. After his death, Shaho Andalibi was among the people who acknowledged his ability in Kurdish folk music and indicated that Ali complained about the terrible situation, i.e. social and political issues, of the Kurdish folk singers.
