= Balance and Revival Coalition =

Coalition in Kurdistan Region, Iraq

Balance and Revival Coalition هاوپەیمانی هاوسەنگی و بوژانەوە
- Founder: Shaswar Abdulwahid; Bafel Talabani
- Founded: 2 July 2026; 31 days ago
- Member parties: Patriotic Union of Kurdistan; New Generation Movement
- Country: Iraq
- Federal Region: Kurdistan Region
- Seats in The Kurdistan Region Parliament: 38 / 100

Balance and Revival Coalition or Balance and Prosperity Coalition (Sorani Kurdish: هاوپەیمانی هاوسەنگی و بوژانەوە) is a coalition formed by The Patriotic Union of Kurdistan and The New Generation Movement after The 2024 Kurdistan Region parliamentary election, to form the 10th Cabinet of The Kurdistan Regional Government.

== The Agreement ==
=== The start of the agreement ===
on January 15, 2026, Shaswar Abdulwahid president of The New Generation Movement in a press conference proposed a challenge to balance power in The Kurdistan Regional Government to Kurdish parties in forming the 10th Cabinet of The Kurdistan Regional Government. After the press conference Bafel Talabani president of The Patriotic Union of Kurdistan responded with a video on social media accepting the proposal. on January 17, 2026, both party presidents Shaswar Abdulwahid and Bafel Talabani went on a press conference and announced a united front to form the new government.

=== Strengthening the alliance ===
in May 2026 The New Generation Movement's political council approved a broader political agreement with the Patriotic Union of Kurdistan in the agreement The New Generation Movement received a ministry in The Iraqi Council of Ministers.

=== Signing the official agreement ===
The agreement to form the alliance was signed on July 2, 2026, in The Grand Millennium Hotel in Sulaymaniyah by Patriotic Union of Kurdistan president Bafel Jalal Talabani and New Generation Movement president Shaswar Abdulwahid.

== See also ==
- Patriotic Union of Kurdistan
- New Generation Movement
- Shaswar Abdulwahid
- Bafel Talabani
