= Thaer =

Thaer is a surname and masculine given name of Arabic origin. Notable people with the name include:

== Given name ==
- Thaer Alhasnawi (born 1973), Iraqi television presenter
- Thaer Krouma (born 1990), Syrian footballer
- Thaer Thabet, Iraqi activist

== Surname ==
- Albrecht Thaer (1752–1828), German agronomist
- Albrecht von Thaer (1868–1957), Prussian general
- Lewis Von Thaer (born 1961), American business executive

== See also ==
- Thayer (name)
