= Outline of Asia =

Largest and most populous continent

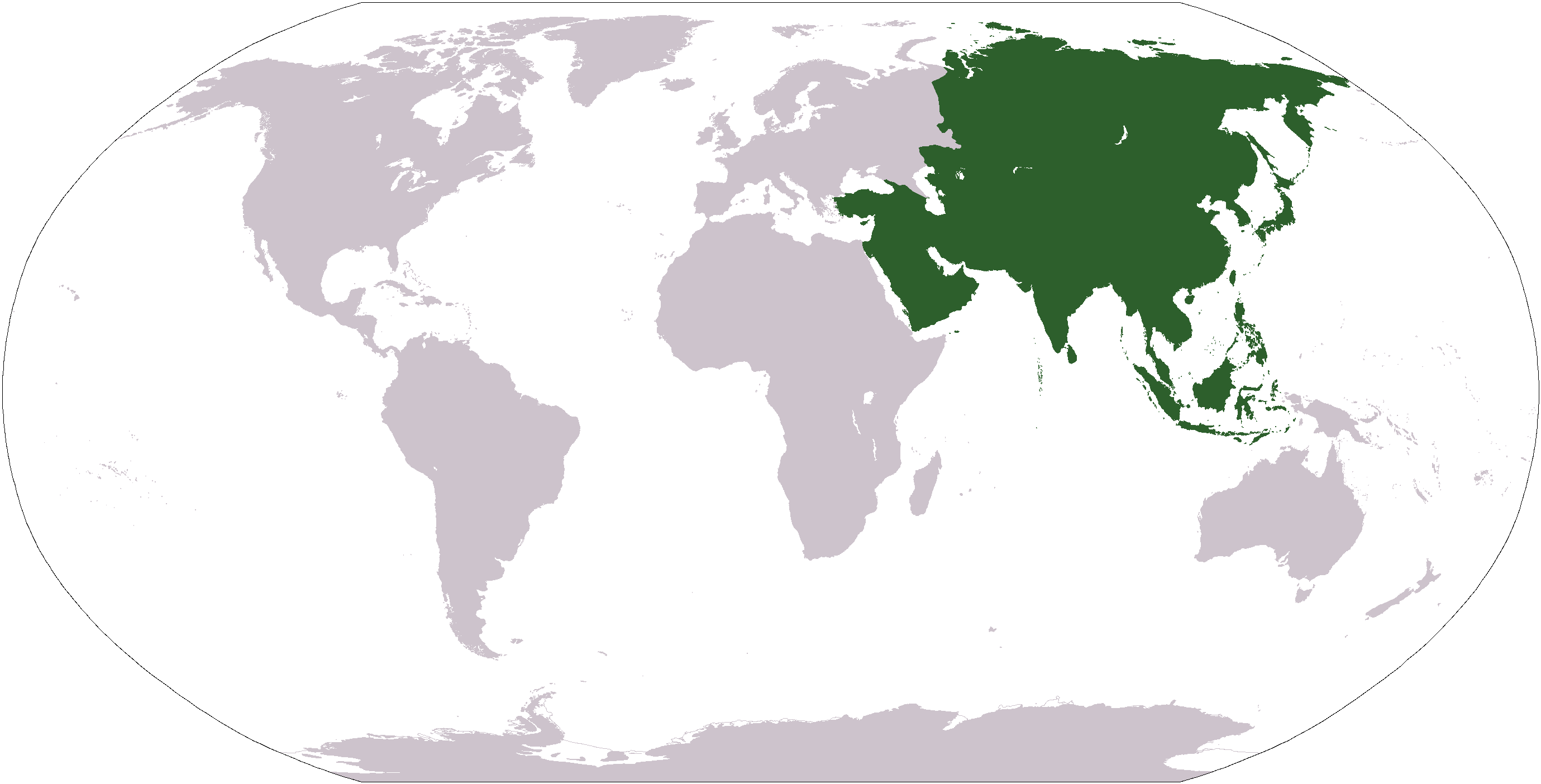

The following outline is provided as an overview of and topical guide to Asia.

Asia is the world's largest and most populous continent, located primarily in the Eastern Hemisphere and Northern Hemisphere. It covers 8.7% of the Earth's total surface area (or 30% of its land area) and with approximately 4.655 billion people, it hosts 60% of the world's current human population.

== Geography of Asia ==
- Atlas of Asia
- List of cities of East Asia

=== Regions of Asia ===
- Central Asia
- East Asia
- North Asia
- South Asia
- Southeast Asia
- West Asia

=== Countries of Asia ===
List of Asian countries

- Coats of arms of Asia
- Flags of Asia
- List of Asian countries by GDP PPP
- List of Asian countries by population
- List of Asia-related articles

Abkhazia
Afghanistan
(United Kingdom) Akrotiri and Dhekelia
Armenia
Azerbaijan
Bahrain
Bangladesh
Bhutan
British Indian Ocean Territory
Brunei
Cambodia
China
Cyprus
Georgia
Hong Kong
India
Indonesia
Iran

Iraq
Israel
Japan
Jordan
Kazakhstan
North Korea
South Korea
Kuwait
Kyrgyzstan
Laos
Lebanon
Macau
Malaysia
Maldives
Mongolia
Myanmar
Nagorno-Karabakh
Nepal
Oman
Pakistan
Palestine

Philippines
Qatar
Saudi Arabia
Singapore
Sri Lanka
South Ossetia
Syria
Taiwan
Tajikistan
Thailand
Tibet
Timor-Leste
Turkey
Turkish Republic of Northern Cyprus
Turkmenistan
United Arab Emirates
Uzbekistan
Vietnam
Yemen

=== Geographic features of Asia ===
- List of World Heritage Sites in Asia
- List of glaciers in Asia
- List of landforms of Asia
- List of mountains in Asia
- List of rivers of Asia

=== Demography of Asia ===
Demographics of Asia

== History of Asia ==
- Imperialism in Asia
- Events preceding World War II in Asia

=== History by field ===
- History of Cartography in Asia
- Coinage of Asia
- Chronology of European exploration of Asia
- Military history of Asia

=== History by region ===
- History of Central Asia
- History of East Asia
- History of North Asia
- History of South Asia
- History of Southeast Asia
- History of West Asia

== Culture of Asia ==
Culture of Asia

- Asian people
- Etiquette in Asia
- Religion in Asia
  - Buddhism in East Asia
  - Buddhism in Southeast Asia
  - Chinese folk religion in Southeast Asia
  - Islam in Asia
  - Christianity in Asia
  - Hinduism in Southeast Asia
- World Heritage Sites

== Environment of Asia ==
Environment of Asia

- Fauna of Asia

== Economy and infrastructure of Asia ==
Economy of Asia

- Wind power in Asia

=== Communications in Asia ===
- List of newspapers in Asia
- List of radio stations in Asia
- List of television stations in Eastern and Southern Asia
- List of television stations in Southeast Asia
- List of television stations in Central and Western Asia

== Education in Asia ==
- Asian studies
- Central Asian studies
- East Asian studies
- Southeast Asian studies

== Politics of Asia ==
Politics of Asia

- Asian values
- Conflicts in Asia
- Legal systems in Asia
- Political parties in Asia
- Pan-Asianism
- Pirate radio in Asia

== See also ==
- Continent

Indexes of articles on the countries of Asia

- Index of Armenia-related articles
- Index of Azerbaijan-related articles
- Index of Bahrain-related articles
- Index of Bangladesh-related articles
- Index of Brunei-related articles
- Index of Cambodia-related articles
- Index of China-related articles
- Index of Cyprus-related articles
- Index of East Timor-related articles
- Index of Georgia-related articles
- Index of Hong Kong-related articles
- Index of Indonesia-related articles
- Index of Iran-related articles
- Index of Israel-related articles
- Index of Japan-related articles
- Index of Jordan-related articles
- Index of Kazakhstan-related articles
- Index of Kuwait-related articles
- Index of Kyrgyzstan-related articles
- Index of Laos-related articles
- Index of Macau-related articles
- Index of Malaysia-related articles
- Index of Maldives-related articles
- Index of Mongolia-related articles
- Index of Myanmar-related articles
- Index of Nepal-related articles
- Index of North Korea–related articles
- Index of Oman-related articles
- Index of Philippines-related articles
- Index of Qatar-related articles
- Index of Saudi Arabia-related articles
- Index of Singapore-related articles
- Index of South Korea–related articles
- Index of Sri Lanka-related articles
- Index of Taiwan-related articles
- Index of Tajikistan-related articles
- Index of Thailand-related articles
- Index of Turkey-related articles
- Index of Turkmenistan-related articles
- Index of United Arab Emirates-related articles
- Index of Vietnam-related articles
