= Mosagallu =

2021 Indian film by Jeffrey Gee Chin

- Theatrical release poster
- Directed by: Jeffrey Gee Chin
- Written by: Vishnu Manchu
- Produced by: Vishnu Manchu
- Starring: Vishnu Manchu; Kajal Aggarwal; Suniel Shetty; Ruhi Singh; Navdeep; Naveen Chandra
- Cinematography: Sheldon Chau
- Edited by: Gautham Raju
- Music by: Sam C. S.
- Production companies: 24 Frames Factory; AVA Entertainment
- Release date: 19 March 2021
- Country: India
- Language: Telugu
- Budget: ₹51 crore
- Box office: est.₹0.5 cr Gross

Mosagallu (transl. Deceivers) is a 2021 Indian Telugu-language Techno-thriller film directed by Jeffrey Gee Chin, and written and produced by Vishnu Manchu under the banner of AVA Entertainment and 24 Frames Factory. The film is based on the true events of a large-scale technical support scam and features an ensemble cast that includes Vishnu Manchu, Kajal Aggarwal, Suniel Shetty, Ruhi Singh, Navdeep, and Naveen Chandra.

Principal photography began in June 2019. The film was scheduled to be released on 5 June 2020 but was postponed due to the COVID-19 pandemic. The film was made on an estimated budget of ₹51 crore (US$7 million), which was considered as false information by Manchu after watching movie's content and quality.

The Telugu version of the film was released on 19 March 2021 along with its dubbed versions in Hindi, Tamil and Kannada as Anu and Arjun, and in Malayalam as Arjun and Anu. Mosagallu was a box-office bomb.

== Plot ==
Based on a true series of incidents that shook the Indian IT industry and conned $380 million (2,800 crores), the film is about cultural clashes — between generations, between east and west, and between rich and poor. A call center scam in India rips off millions of dollars of US taxpayers' money.

Born into a poor family, Anu (Kajal Aggarwal) and Arjun (Vishnu Manchu) sketch out a plan for easy money, aided by their friend Sid (Naveen Chandra). They team up with a rich man Vijay (Navdeep), set up a call center, and loot millions of dollars from US taxpayers. An upright cop, Aajit Kumar Singh (Suniel Shetty), takes charge to nab them. After several failed attempts, he finally bursts the scam and unfolds the mysterious gang behind this scam.

== Cast ==
- Vishnu Manchu as Arjun, Anu's brother
- Kajal Aggarwal as Anu, Arjun's sister
- Suniel Shetty as Additional Commissioner Of Police Officer Aajit Kumar Singh
- Ruhi Singh as Mohini
- Navdeep as Vijay
- Naveen Chandra as Sid
- Mahima Makwana as Soha
- Nagineedu as DGP
- Tanikella Bharani as Mukund, Arjun and Anu's father
- Tulasi as Padma, Arjun and Anu's mother
- Ravi Prakash as Vikram, Anu's ex-husband
- Raghu Babu as Swamiji
- Raja Ravindra as Dongre
- Ravi Varma as Raj
- Raghuram Shetty as Dewan Rao
- Saurabh Goyal as Rock
- Juliette Audrey
- Priscilla Avila
- Katelyn Ann Clark
- Shivam Jemini
- Jasmine Kaur as Samaira

== Release ==
The film was released on 19 March 2021 along with its dubbed versions in Hindi, Tamil and Kannada as Anu and Arjun and in Malayalam as Arjun and Anu.

== Reception ==
On the review aggregator website Rotten Tomatoes, 20% of 5 critics' reviews are positive, with an average rating of 4/10.

Times of India rated the movie 2.5 out of 5 mentioning Vishnu Manchu and Kajal Aggarwal deliver a decent performance. The critics rated 2.5 and the users given a rating of 3 out of 5 on the Telugu Samayam website, called the movie an average one and heaped praises on the performances of Vishnu and Kajal. Sangeetha devi of The Hindu mentioned Mosagallu is partly engaging with no gripping story. Eenadu was impressed with the movie's plot and performances of Vishnu, Kajal, Suniel Shetty and concluded the movie would've been if the screen play was a bit taut and the climax could've been handled better.
