= Al-Shaaer TV =

Iraqi TV channel

- Type: Religious television
- Country: Iraq
- Broadcast area: Middle East, Europe, North America

Programming
- Language: Arabic
- Picture format: HDTV

Ownership
- Owner: Al-Shaaer International Media Group

History
- Founded: 2006

Availability Free-to-air worldwide

Streaming media
- YouTube: Al-Shaaer Channel

Al-Shaaer TV (Arabic: قناة الشعائر الفضائية) is an Arabic speaking, Iraqi religious television channel. The channel mainly broadcasts religious lectures, culture teachings, and social programs aimed at Shiite Muslim in Iraq and other parts of the world.

== See also ==
- Karbala TV
