= Alfarqadain TV =

Alfarqadain TV قناة الفرقدين الفضائية
- Country: Iraq
- Broadcast area: Worldwide, via satellite and internet

Programming
- Language(s): English, Arabic

History
- Launched: 2012

Links
- Website: alfarqadain.tv/wp/

Availability

Streaming media
- Live stream: alfarqadain.tv/wp/

Alfarqadain TV (Arabic: قناة الفرقدين الفضائية) is an Iraqi satellite television channel based in Baghdad, Iraq. The channel was launched in 2012.

== See also ==
- Television in Iraq
