= Sarwa Abdulwahid =

Iraqi Kurdish politician

- سرووە عەبدولواحید
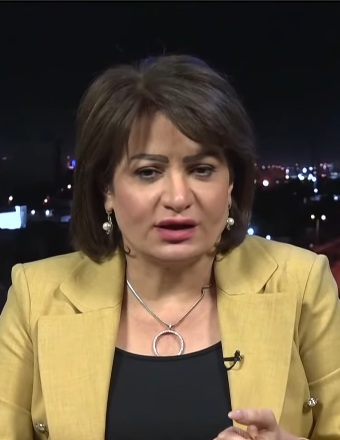
- Sarwa Abdulwahid in 2021

Minister of Environment
- Incumbent
- Assumed office 17 May 2026
- President: Nizar Amidi
- Prime Minister: Ali al-Zaidi
- Preceded by: Hallo Mustafa Al-Askari

Member of the Iraqi Council of Representatives
- In office 2014–2018
- Parliamentary group: Gorran Movement
- Constituency: Erbil
- In office 2021–2025
- Parliamentary group: New Generation Movement
- Constituency: Sulaymaniyah

Personal details
- Party: New Generation Movement (2017-Now)
- Other political affiliations: Movement for Change (2014-2017)
- Education: University of Baghdad
- Occupation: Politician, journalist and teacher

Sarwa Abdulwahid (Sorani Kurdish: سرووە عەبدولواحید Arabic: سروة عبدالواحد) is an Iraqi Kurdish politician and former journalist from Kurdistan. She was the first woman to be a candidate for Iraqi Presidency in 2018 but failed to become the president. Sarwa Abdulwahid has been serving as the minister of environment in the iraqi government since May 17th 2026. and is an active member of The New Generation Movement.

== Biography ==
Sarwa Abdulwahid is from Kurdistan. Abdulwahid graduated from the University of Baghdad in 1993 with a degree in Arabic languages. She went on to become a journalist and then worked as a teacher. In 1996, she presented a nightly political program on the Alhurra network. While a journalist, she reported that she was regularly subject to threats of false reporting by the Kurdistan Regional Government.

In 1998, she started work in the Iraqi Council of Ministers working mainly on women's rights issues.

=== Iraqi Council of Representatives ===
In 2014, she became a member of the Iraqi Council of Representatives for the Erbil Governorate, serving until 2018 as a member of the Movement for Change party.

During the 2017 Kurdistan Region independence referendum, Abdulwahid was publicly opposed to the region's move towards independence. Her position stood in contrast to over 90% of those voting in support.

Abdulwahid was later expelled from the Movement for Change party after expressing opinions contrary to party leadership.

=== Presidency candidate ===
In September 2018, she announced her candidacy for the presidency of Iraq as an independent, becoming the first woman to run for president in the country's history. In October of that year, she announced that she had been urged to withdraw her candidacy, and was subject to threats over the internet.

=== New Generation Movement ===
In 2017, Abdulwahid's brother, media businessman Shaswar Abdulwahid founded the New Generation Movement party. Sarwa later joined the new political party. After Shaswar Abdulwahid named his sister Sarwa as head of party relations, the move was heavily criticized by political observers as nepotism.

In the 2021 Iraqi parliamentary elections, Sarwa Abdulwahid was elected as an MP for the New Generation Movement party. In the election, she received 28,987 votes, the largest number of votes of any female candidate running. At the time of her election she said, "The times are ripe for change...independents and reformist parties can uphold rights and freedoms, including for women and minorities. They can also participate in lawmaking efforts to curtail arms and punish militia members guilty of crimes".

In 2024, Sarwa Abdulwahid filed a lawsuit in Iraq's Federal Supreme Court calling for the dissolution of the Kurdistan Regional Government if elections were not conducted within three months. The lawsuit was later dismissed.

=== Minister role ===
In January 17th 2025 The Patriotic Union of Kurdistan (PUK) and The New Generation Movement announced an agreement between the parties to work with each other in forming the new government in the Kurdistan Regional Government. besides the new government of KRG the PUK and NGM also agreed on giving NGM one of PUK's ministers in the iraqi council of ministers. NGM's choice for minister was Sarwa Abdulwahid. She officially began her duties as minister of environment in May 17th 2026 replacing Dr. Hallo Al-Askari.

== See also ==
- Shaswar Abdulwahid
- New Generation Movement
