= Basrah TV =

Iraqi satellite TV Channel

Basrah TV قناة البصرة الفضائية
- Country: Iraq
- Broadcast area: Worldwide, via satellite and internet
- Headquarters: Basra, Iraq

Programming
- Language: Arabic
- Picture format: 1080i HDTV

Ownership
- Owner: Basra Governorate
- Key people: Thaer Alhasnawi (General Manager) ثائر الحسناوي

History
- Launched: 2025

Links
- Website: www.basrah.tv

Availability

Streaming media
- Live stream: basrah.tv/live/basra

Basrah TV also called Al Basrah TV (Arabic: قناة البصرة الفضائية); is an Iraqi satellite television network based in Basra, Iraq. The channel was launched sometime in 2025 by Basra Governorate and businessmen. Thaer Alhasnawi was recently appointed as the channel's general manager.

== Programs ==
- Studio Almalaeb - ستوديو الملاعب (in Arabic)
- Studio Alateba - ستديو الاطباء (in Arabic)
- Sabah Alrabiaa - صباح البصرة(in Arabic)
