= Thaer Alhasnawi =

Iraqi television presenter (born 1973)

- ثائر جياد الحسناوي
- Born: Thaer Jead Alhasnawi; 20 October 1973 (age 52); Baghdad, Iraq
- Education: Baghdad University
- Occupations: Television presenter, media personality, screenwriter
- Years active: 2002–present

Thaer Jead Alhasnawi (Arabic: ثائر جياد الحسناوي; born 20 October 1973) is an Iraqi television presenter, media personality, and screenwriter. He founder of Jim Sen Podcast. He was the general manager of the Asia Network Television and Currently the general manager of Basrah TV.

== Education ==
Alhasnawi was born on 20 October 1973, in Baghdad. He was imprisoned for eight years for his political activism against Saddam Hussein's regime until his release in 2002 under a general amnesty. He holds a bachelor's degree in mathematics and earned a master's degree in mathematics from the University of Kufa in 2019.

Alhasnawi worked as a media advisor to the Iraqi Governing Council, director of research and development at the Iraqi Media Network, director of Babylon FM, assistant to the head of the Iraqi Broadcasting and Transmission Authority, of the Asia Network Television and currently the general manager of Basrah TV.

Alhasnawi has written numerous political and social articles, presented and produced several television and radio programs, written the screenplay for the series "Dawlat al-Khurafah", and authored the series "Ward Amriki" in 2020 and the program "Tanb Raslan".

Alhasnawi was investigated by the office of current Iraqi Prime Minister Mohammed Shia al-Sudani after he aired an episode of his podcast, Jim Sen, featuring former Iraqi Prime Minister Nouri al-Maliki.

== Career ==
He worked in several satellite channels, among them:

- Babylon FM
- Iraqi Media Network
- Iraqi Governing Council
- Dijlah TV
- Asia Network Television (GM of the channel)
- general manager of Basrah TV. 2025– Now
