= Battelle Memorial Institute =

American applied science and technology development company

Coordinates: 39.988770°N 83.019440°W

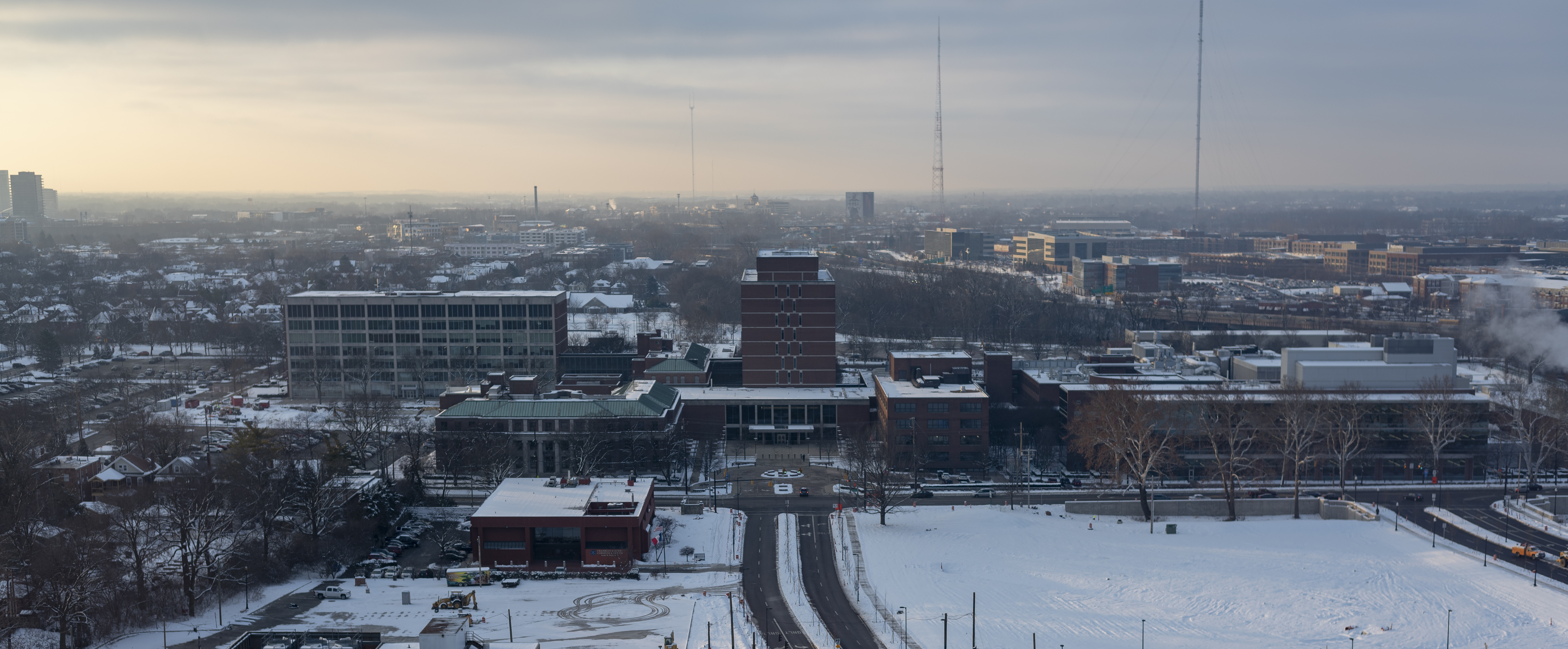
- Battelle Memorial Institute Headquarters in Columbus
- Type: Private Nonprofit Charitable Trust
- Industry: National Security, Healthcare, Environment
- Founded: Columbus, Ohio (1929)
- Headquarters: Columbus, Ohio, U.S.
- Key people: Lewis Von Thaer, President and CEO
- Services: Research & Development, Engineering Services
- Revenue: US$14 billion
- Total assets: 1,249,023,195 United States dollar (2011)
- Number of employees: 40,000
- Website: battelle.org

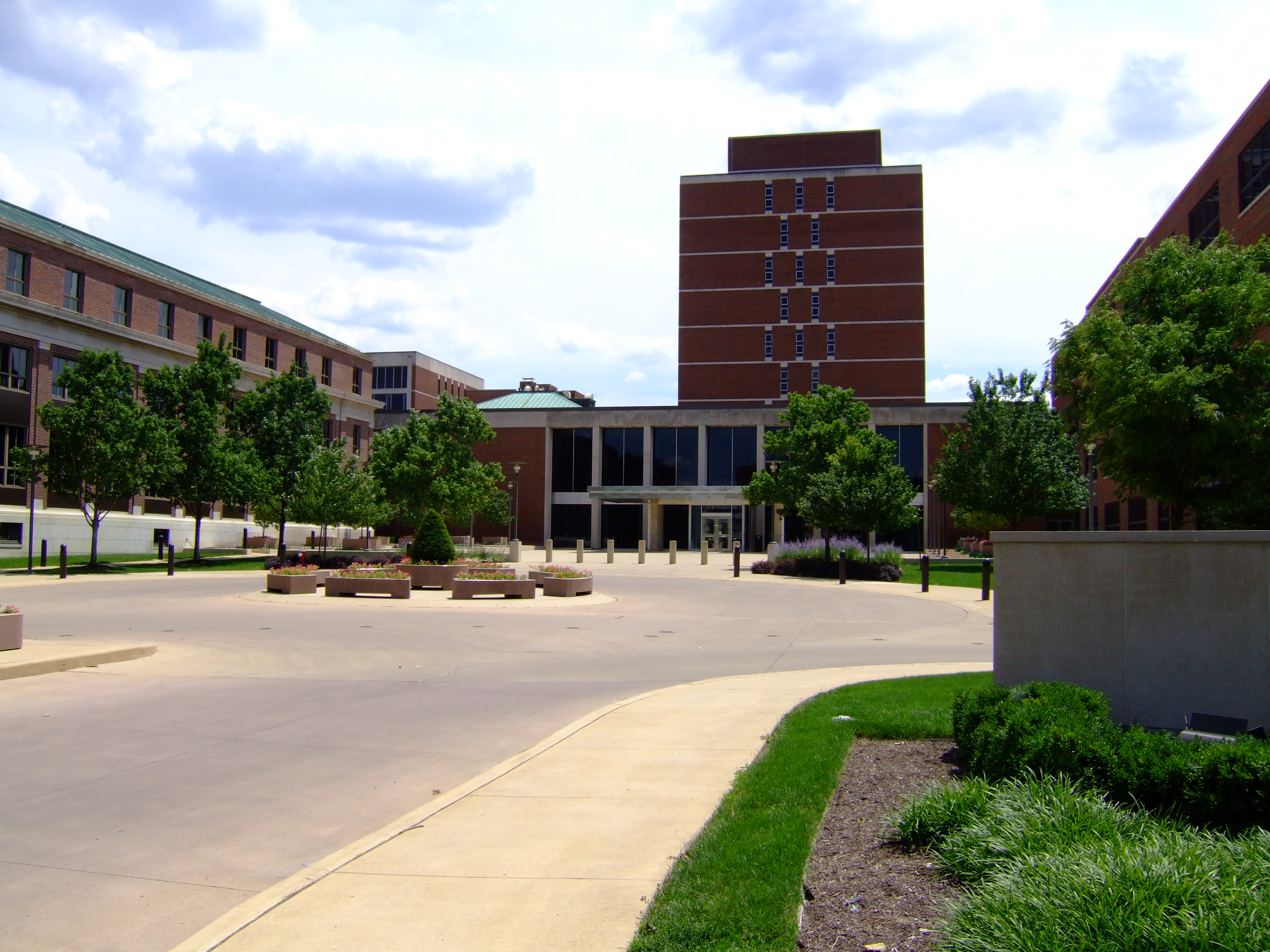
Headquarters in Columbus

Battelle Memorial Institute (or simply Battelle) is an American private nonprofit applied science and technology development company headquartered in Columbus, Ohio.

== History ==
The institute was founded in 1929 by Gordon Battelle. Originally focusing on contract research and development work in the areas of metals and material science, Battelle is now an international science and technology enterprise that explores emerging areas of science, develops and commercializes technology, and manages laboratories for customers. It has 3,200 employees, and manages another 29,500 in ten United States Department of Energy National Laboratories.

From 1969 to 1975, the institute was involved in a lawsuit over whether it was "neglecting its philanthropic promises" as a nonprofit organization. It reached an $80 million settlement in 1975 (equivalent to $479 million in 2025), used to demolish Union Station, build Battelle Hall at the Columbus Convention Center, refurbish the Ohio Theatre and create Battelle-Darby Creek Metro Park. The institute lost its nonprofit status in the 1990s, though regained it by 2001.

== Operations ==
=== Contract research business ===
Battelle serves the following:

- Agribusiness: crop protection, encapsulation, formulation, environmental fate, spray drift and droplet characterization
- Ecology and environment: scientific data packages for researchers, air, water and soil analysis, PFAS and emerging contaminant assessment, analysis, destruction and remediation
- Health: genomics, life sciences research, medical device development, neurotechnology, public health studies
- Materials science: analytical chemistry, characterization, coatings, compounds and structures, corrosion studies, nanoparticles and materials
- National security: aviation and aerospace technologies, chemical and biological defense systems, cyber innovations, ground tactical systems, maritime technologies
- Research infrastructure: Biosafety Laboratory 3 (BSL3) operations, chemical demilitarization facilities, National Ecological Observatory Network, national laboratory management
- STEM education: BattelleEd, STEMX, Battelle Arts Grant, STEM Learning Networks

In addition to its Columbus, Ohio headquarters, Battelle has offices in Aberdeen, Maryland; West Jefferson, Ohio; Seattle, Washington; Arlington, Virginia; Norwell, Massachusetts; Charlottesville, Virginia; Baltimore, Maryland; Boulder, Colorado; and Egg Harbor Township, New Jersey.

=== Federal government project management ===
==== National laboratories ====
In addition to operating its own research facilities, as of 2022, Battelle managed or co-managed on behalf of the United States Department of Energy the following national laboratories:

- Brookhaven National Laboratory (through Brookhaven Science Associates, LLC – a collaboration between Battelle and Stony Brook University)
- Idaho National Laboratory (through the Battelle Energy Alliance – a collaboration between Battelle, BWX Technologies, Inc., Washington Group International, Electric Power Research Institute and an alliance of universities)
- Lawrence Livermore National Laboratory (through Lawrence Livermore National Security, LLC – a collaboration between Battelle, BWX Technologies, Inc., Washington Group International, the University of California, Bechtel National, and The Texas A&M University System)
- Los Alamos National Laboratory (through Triad National Security, LLC – a collaboration between Battelle, the University of California, and The Texas A&M University System)
- National Laboratory of the Rockies (formerly National Renewable Energy Laboratory; in partnership with MRIGlobal as part of the Alliance for Sustainable Energy, LLC)
- Oak Ridge National Laboratory (through UT-Battelle, LLC – a collaboration between Battelle and the University of Tennessee)
- Pacific Northwest National Laboratory
- Savannah River National Laboratory (through the Battelle Savannah River Alliance)

==== Homeland Security ====
On behalf of the Department of Homeland Security:

- National Biodefense Analysis and Countermeasures Center

==== National Science Foundation projects ====
- In March 2016, Battelle was selected to manage the completion of the National Ecological Observatory Network (NEON) for the National Science Foundation.

=== Battelle Center for Science and Technology Policy (OSU/Glenn) ===
Battelle provides funds for a public policy research center at the John Glenn College of Public Affairs of Ohio State University to focus on scholarly questions associated with science and technology policy. The Battelle Center for Science and Technology Policy at Ohio State in July 2011.

== International collaboration ==
Batelle is an active member of the University of the Arctic. UArctic is an international cooperative network based in the Circumpolar Arctic region, consisting of more than 200 universities, colleges, and other organizations with an interest in promoting education and research in the Arctic region.

== Notable projects ==
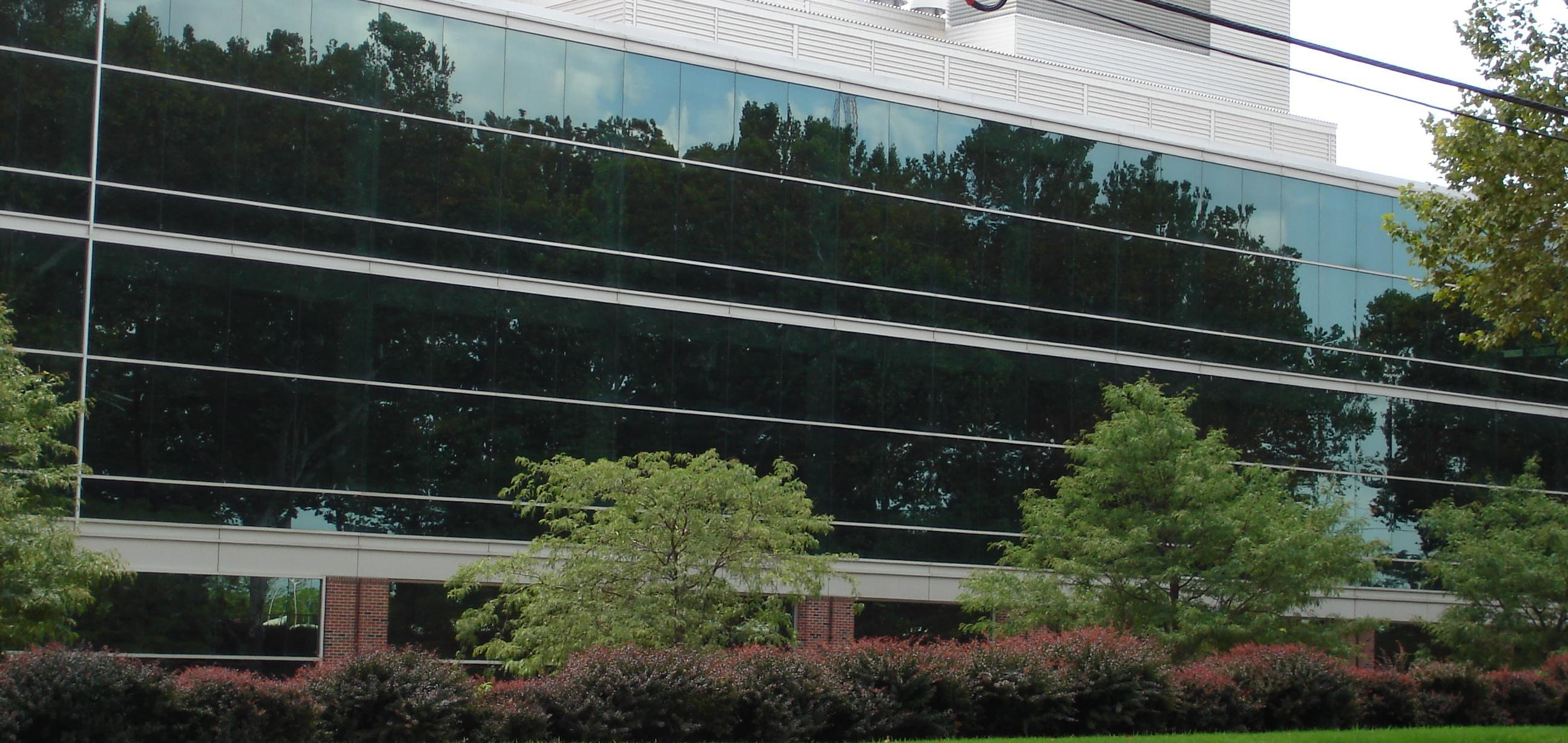
View of Columbus facilities from King Avenue

Notable Battelle projects include:

- Armor plating for tanks in World War II.
- Correction fluid - Snopake, the first correction fluid, developed in 1955;
- COVID rapid test - In April 2020, Battelle Memorial Institute partnered with Ohio State University to distribute rapid tests for COVID-19, with results in less than 5 hours.
- Cruise control – for automobiles in 1970;
- Digital voting – Battelle was the contractor for a computer system on which the Voter News Service relied for tallying exit polling data in the November 2002 U.S. Congressional and Senate elections; the system failed and results were not reported until ten months after the election. The failure led to the disbanding of the VNS and the formation of its replacement, the National Election Pool.
- Dry copying – In the 1940s, Battelle's vice-president of engineering, John Crout made it possible for Battelle researchers, including William Bixby and Paul Andrus, to develop Chester Carlson's concept of dry copying. Carlson had been turned down for funding by more than a dozen agencies including the U.S. Navy. Work led to the first commercial xerographic equipment, and the formation of Xerox corporation.
- Fiber optics – In 1987 PIRI, a fiber optics venture with Mitsubishi and NTT, was launched, which resulted in a $1.8 billion market.
- Medical advances – Including a 1972 breakthrough development of special tubing to prevent blood clots during surgical procedures, and more recently, the development of reusable insulin injection pen, including dose memory, with Eli Lilly and Company
- "No-melt" chocolate – In conjunction with Kevin M. Amula, Battelle Geneva developed "No-melt" chocolate in 1988.
- Nuclear fuel rod – Battelle developed the first nuclear fuel rods for nuclear reactors, including the first nuclear submarine, the USS Nautilus (SSN-571), as well as numerous advances in metallurgy that helped advance the United States space program {citation needed}
- Optical digital recorder – Algorithms and coatings that led to the first optical digital recorder developed by James Russell, which paved the way for the first compact disc, and the first generation jet engines using titanium alloys.
- N95 respirator decontamination – On March 29, 2020, Battelle announced that it had received an Emergency Use Authorization to deploy a system to decontaminate N95 respirators for healthcare providers. Battelle received a $400 million contract from the Defense Logistics Agency for the project, known as the Critical Care Decontamination System (CCDS). Following the conclusion of the program in May 2021, Battelle invoiced $155 million, with 5 million masks decontaminated and an average cost of $31 per mask.
- Photovoltaic cell – the first all-sputtered photovoltaic cell for solar energy in 1974.
- Universal Product Code – Development of the Universal Product Code (UPC) in 1965;

== See also ==
- Chester Carlson
- Raymond Davis, Jr.
- Future Attribute Screening Technology (FAST)
- Top 100 US Federal Contractors
