= Waar tv =

Waar Media
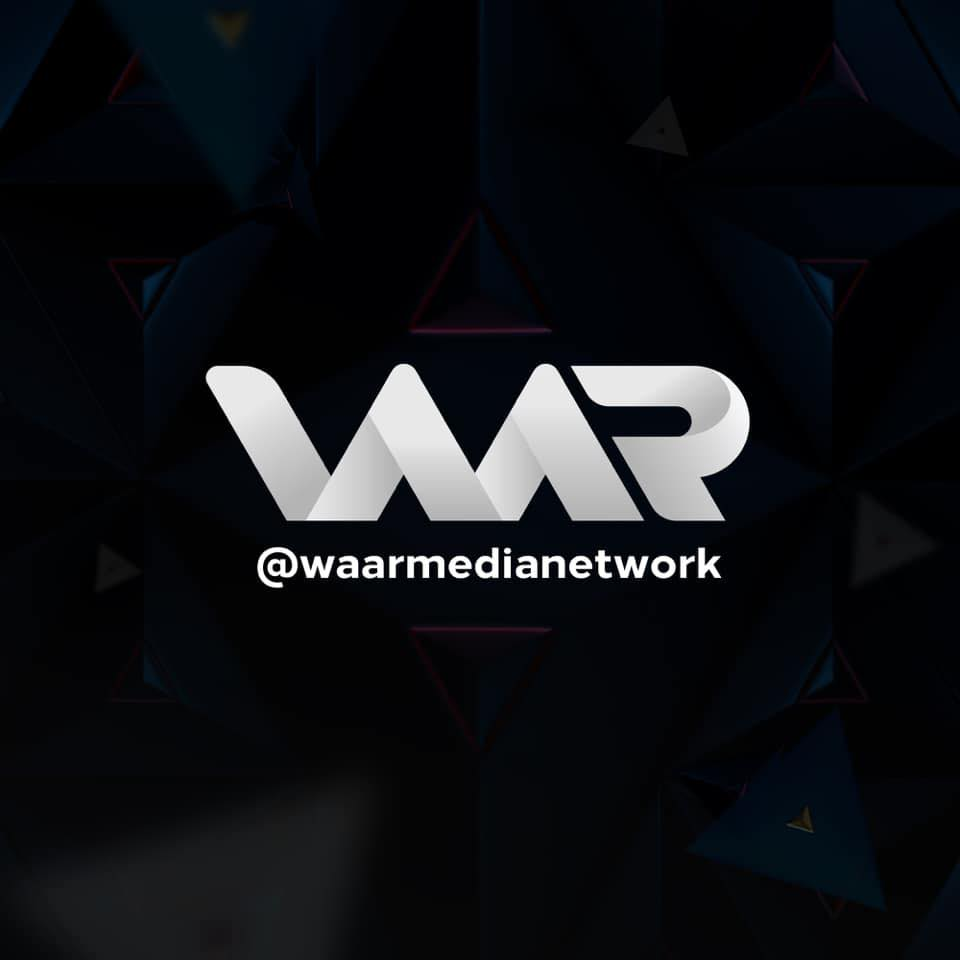
- Country: Iraq
- Broadcast area: Worldwide
- Headquarters: Duhok, Kurdistan Region, Iraq

Programming
- Languages: Kurdish (Sorani and Kurmanci) and English
- Picture format: 1080i50 (16:9 HDTV)

Ownership
- Owner: Delshad Shaban Abdulghafar

History
- Launched: 2013; 13 years ago

Links
- Webcast: Live stream
- Website: waarmedia.com

Waar TV is a Kurdish broadcasting station, based in Duhok, Kurdistan Region, Iraq. institution was founded in 2013 and in 2019, it began its publication with new management and policy. Waar is owned by Palo Broadcasting and Media Company which consists of Waar Channel, Waar Radio, and several social networking platforms called Waar Media. Waar focuses on cultural, social, and artistic aspects and has a humanitarian and Kurdish message. The channel aims to raise social awareness and protect coexistence, social peace, and environmental conservation. Waar tries to preserve the authenticity of Kurdistan society through its production of series, music, and documentaries.

Lately, Mehdi Mutlu and Gernas Nenas, who are presenters on Waar TV, have greatly contributed to the popularity of Waar TV. Mehdi Mutlu presents programs such as "Mehdi Mêhvan E" "Kafe Kemîn", Gernas Nenas presents programs such as "Kurt û Kurmancî" and "Pencereya Bakur".

== Programming ==
Waar TV is an art and entertainment channel transmitting worldwide from the Eutelsat 7 West A on 10727 Hz Vertical, SR 27500 The channel airs entertainment programs based on "Kurdish culture and values", and covers entertainment events in Iraq and Kurdistan Region. Waar Entertainment offers a radio broadcast in Kurdistan. WAAR Entertainment's programs and series can be accessed digitally in other parts of the world through its website and mobile apps.

== See also ==
- List of Kurdish-language television channels
