= Hallo Al-Askari =

Iraqi politician

- هەڵۆ موستەفا عەسکەری

Minister of Environment
- In office 26 November 2024 – 17 May 2026
- Prime Minister: Mohammed Shia' al-Sudani
- Preceded by: Nizar Amidi
- Succeeded by: Sarwa Abdulwahid

Acting Minister of Higher Education & Scientific Research
- In office 8 February 2026 – 18 May 2026
- Prime Minister: Mohammed Shia' al-Sudani
- Preceded by: Dr. Naeem Al-Aboudi
- Succeeded by: Abdul Hussein Al-Mussawi (acting)

Personal details
- Party: Patriotic Union of Kurdistan
- Education: University of Baghdad; Brunel University
- Occupation: Politician

Hallo Mustafa Al-Askari (Sorani Kurdish: هەڵۆ موستەفا عەسکەری, Arabic: هلو مصطفى العسكري) is an Iraqi Kurdish politician who was the acting Minister of Higher Education & Scientific Research Of Iraq from February 8, 2026, until May 18, 2026. prior to that he was the minister of environment of Iraq. Al-Askari has a PhD in Environmental Pollution Science from the Brunel University.

== Career ==
=== Early career ===
Early in his career he had smaller positions in the Kurdistan Regional Government mostly having the role as an advisor. fron 2010 to 2012 under former Prime Minister of the Kurdistan Region Barham Salih he was advisor on environmental concerns. from 2012 until 2018 he became an advisor in the Ministry of Natural Resources of The Kurdistan Region. after that from 2018 until 2020 he took over as the Chairman of the Environment Board of the Kurdistan Region. then in 2020 he became an advisor to the Deputy Prime Minister of the Kurdistan Region.

=== Minister of Environment ===
On 26 November 2024 he was elected as the minister of environment in the Iraqi Council of Ministers replacing Nizar Amedi.

== See also ==
- Patriotic Union of Kurdistan
- Nizar Amidi
- Sarwa Abdulwahid
