= Lao National Radio =

National radio station in Laos

- Type: State radio network
- Country: Laos

Programming
- Languages: English, French, Khmer, Thai, Lao

Ownership
- Owner: Government of Laos

History
- Launch date: 13 August 1960; 66 years ago

Coverage
- Availability: Laos

Links
- Website: lnr.org.la

Lao National Radio (officially abbreviated as LNR, Lao: ວິທະຍຸກະຈາຍສຽງແຫ່ງຊາດລາວ, romanized: Vithanyu Kachaisiang Haeng Sat Lao) is the national radio station for the country of Laos. It was founded on 13 August 1960 and became a national broadcaster in 1975.

Between 1983 and 1993, Lao National Radio was administered jointly with Lao National Television.

== History ==
On 13 August 1960, the station was founded by Pathet Lao with its coverage at the time limited to north-eastern Laos. In 1975, after Pathet Lao took over the government, it also took over Royal Lao Radio's infrastructure, which was also set up in 1960, the same year as the Lao PLA-backed station. On 1 December 1983, it began sharing its administration with that of Lao National Television, things remained that way until 1993, when LNTV became independent from LNR.

Its headquarters are based in Vientiane and it airs programs in Laotian, Hmong, Khmer, Vietnamese, French, English, Thai and Chinese. Cooperation with China Radio International ramped up on 4 December 2015 when it and LNR teamed up for a joint Mandarin service.

== Frequencies ==
Lao National Radio can be heard on the following frequencies:

- 567 kHz AM (Lao National Radio Program 1)
- 103.7 MHz FM (Lao National Radio Program 1)

== See also ==
- Lao News Agency
- Vientiane Times
- List of radio stations in Asia
