= List of television stations in Central Asia =

This is a 'list of television stations in Central Asia.

== Kazakhstan ==
Kazakh Television & Radio Corporation

- Kazakhstan
- KAZSport (Sports Channel)
- Balapan (Children/Youth channel)

Private/Other:

- 31 Kanal
- Gakku TV
- KTK (Kommerceskiyi Televizioniyi Kanal) (Website)
- NTK-TV (Website)
- Toi Duman
- Almaty TV
- Zhuldyz TV
- Khabar Agency
  - 24 Kz (News Channel)
  - Kazakh TV (Satellite Channel)
  - Khabar TV
  - Bilim Zhäne Mädeniet (Culture & Education Channel) (Website)

== Kyrgyzstan ==
Public Broadcasting Corporation of Kyrgyz Republic - KTRK

- KTRK
- Balastan (Children Channel)
- Madaniyat (Cultural Channel)
- Muzyka (Music & Entertainment Channel)
- KTRK Sport (Sport Channel)

Private/Other:

- ElTR TV
- Osh TV (Osh city's TV Channel)
- Yntymak TV (Website)
- Sanat TV
- Sentiabr TV
- NewTV

== Tajikistan ==
TV Tajikistan

- 1TV First Channel (now Tajikistan)
- TV Safina
- Jahonnamo (National and International News Channel, in the Tajik language. Sometimes the channel also broadcasts news in English and Russian)
- Bakhoriston (Children/Youth Channel)
- TV Varzish (Sport Channel, first HD channel in Tajikistan)
- TV Sinamo

== Turkmenistan ==
- Altyn Asyr
- Miras
- Ýaşlyk (Youth channel)
- Turkmenistan (International channel broadcast in seven languages: Turkmen, Russian, English, French, Chinese, Arabic and Persian)
- Türkmen Owazy (Music channel)
- Aşgabat (Focusing on the capital of Turkmenistan)
- Turkmenistan Sport (Sports channel)
- Arkadag TV

== See also ==
- Lists of television channels
- List of television stations in West Asia
- List of television stations in Southeast Asia
- List of television stations in South Asia
- List of television stations in East Asia
