= Legal systems in Asia =

Law in Asia refers to the legal systems of Asian countries.

== Countries ==
- Law of Afghanistan
- Law of Armenia
- Law of Azerbaijan
- Law of Bahrain
- Law of Bangladesh
- Law of Bhutan
- Law of Brunei
- Law of Cambodia
- Law of China
  - Law of the People's Republic of China
  - Law of Hong Kong
  - Law of Macau
  - Law of the Republic of China (Taiwan)
- Law of Cyprus
- Law of Georgia
- Law of India
- Law of Indonesia
- Law of Iran
- Law of Iraq
- Law of Israel
- Law of the Palestinian territories
- Law of Japan
- Law of Jordan
- Law of Kazakhstan
- Law of North Korea
- Law of South Korea
- Law of Kuwait
- Law of Kyrgyzstan
- Law of Laos
- Law of Lebanon
- Law of Malaysia
- Law of Maldives
- Law of Mongolia
- Law of Myanmar
- Law of Nepal
- Law of Oman
- Law of Pakistan
- Law of the Philippines
- Law of Qatar
- Law of Russia
- Law of Saudi Arabia
- Law of Singapore
- Law of Sri Lanka
- Law of Syria
- Law of Tajikistan
- Law of Thailand
- Law of Timor-Leste
- Law of Turkey
- Law of Turkmenistan
- Law of United Arab Emirates
- Law of Uzbekistan
- Law of Vietnam
- Law of Yemen

== See also ==
- Legal systems of the world
