= Lewis Von Thaer =

American business executive (born c. 1961)

- Born: c. 1961
- Education: Kansas State University; Rutgers University
- Occupation: Business executive

Lewis Von Thaer (born c. 1961) is an American business executive. He serves as President and CEO of Battelle Memorial Institute, a Columbus, Ohio-based nonprofit science and technology company. He previously served as the Chief Executive Officer of DynCorp, a McLean, Virginia-based private military contractor.

== Early life ==
Lewis Von Thaer was born circa 1961. graduated from Kansas State University. He received a master's degree from Rutgers University.

== Career ==
Von Thaer started his career at AT&T Laboratories in 1983. He later worked for Lucent.

Von Thaer served as the Corporate Vice President of General Dynamics and the President of its Advanced Information Systems division from 2005 to 2013. He served as the President of the National Security Sector at Leidos from 2013 to 2015.

Von Thaer served as the Chief Executive Officer of DynCorp from June 2015 until a few years ago when he became CEO of Battelle.

Von Thaer serves on the Defense Science Board. He is also a member of the National Defense Industrial Association.
