= Samarra TV =

Samarra TV قناة سامراء الفضائية
- Country: Iraq
- Broadcast area: Worldwide, via satellite and internet

Programming
- Language(s): English, Arabic

History
- Launched: 2013

Links
- Website: www.samarra.tv

Availability

Streaming media
- Live stream: watchfomny.tv/Video/Iraq/Samarra-tv/Samarra-tv.php

Samarra TV (Arabic: قناة سامراء الفضائية) is an Iraqi satellite television channel based in Baghdad, Iraq. The channel was launched in 2013.

== See also ==
- Television in Iraq
