= Afaq TV =

Iraqi television channel

Afaq TV قناة آفاق الفضائية
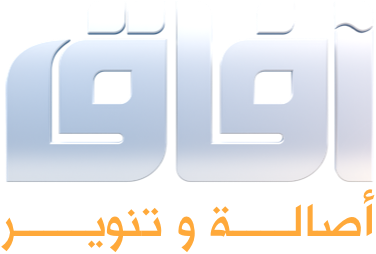
- Country: Iraq
- Broadcast area: Worldwide, via satellite and internet

Programming
- Languages: English, Arabic

History
- Launched: 2006

Links
- Website: www.afaq.tv

Availability

Streaming media
- Live stream: afaq.tv/212/index.html

Afaq TV (Arabic: قناة آفاق الفضائية) is an Iraqi satellite television channel based in Baghdad, Iraq. The channel was launched in 2006. The channel is owned by Nouri al-Maliki.

== See also ==
- Television in Iraq
