= Teddy Channel =

Israeli Television Channel

- Country: Israel
- Broadcast area: Israel

Programming
- Language: Hebrew

Ownership
- Owner: Teddy entrepreneurship and productions Ltd

History
- Launched: November 15, 2017
- Closed: December 30, 2021

Teddy Channel (Hebrew: "ערוץ טדי" or "טדי - קטעים פה") was an Israeli Television Channel that was owned by Teddy entrepreneurship and productions Ltd. It was broadcast on Partner TV on channel 15 from November 2017 until December 30, 2021.

The channel was led by Yuval Natan. The main content manager of the channel was the editor and scriptwriter Nadav Frishman, and the main producer was Asaf Gordon.

== Launch ==
In June 2017, Partner TV increased its service. With the announcement of the launch of the service, it was also announced that Partner is working with Teddy Productions on a new television channel that will broadcast stand-up and entertainment shows. At the end of October 2017, Partner organized a press conference announcing the launch of a new channel called Teddy. During the press conference, it was announced that the channel would share ownership of the content with its 50/50 creators.

== Channel broadcasts ==
The channel broadcasts 24 hours a day; however the number of the initial broadcast hours every day is small (true for 2017), but the assessment is that this number will grow in the future.

The channel broadcasts exclusive content on Partner TV, where it is carried on channel 15 in the provider's channel lineup.

The channel is built on the concept of Bite Size TV and its programs available on Partner TV's VOD and the Catch Up service, which enables view of broadcasts up to two weeks ago.

== Programs ==
- Shemesh
- Ha-Comedy Store
- HaShir Shelanu
- Sachiland
- Tovim and Tovim Pachot
- Super Feed
- Stoppers and errands
- Israeli gentlemens
- Storiz
- Personal studio
- Star Network
- Eve Sherman Properties
- Trio Artistic truth
- Lee Sover - a series of pranks on passersby starring Lee Sover.

== See also ==
- Keshet 12
- Reshet 13
- Channel Ten
