= Musawa (TV) =

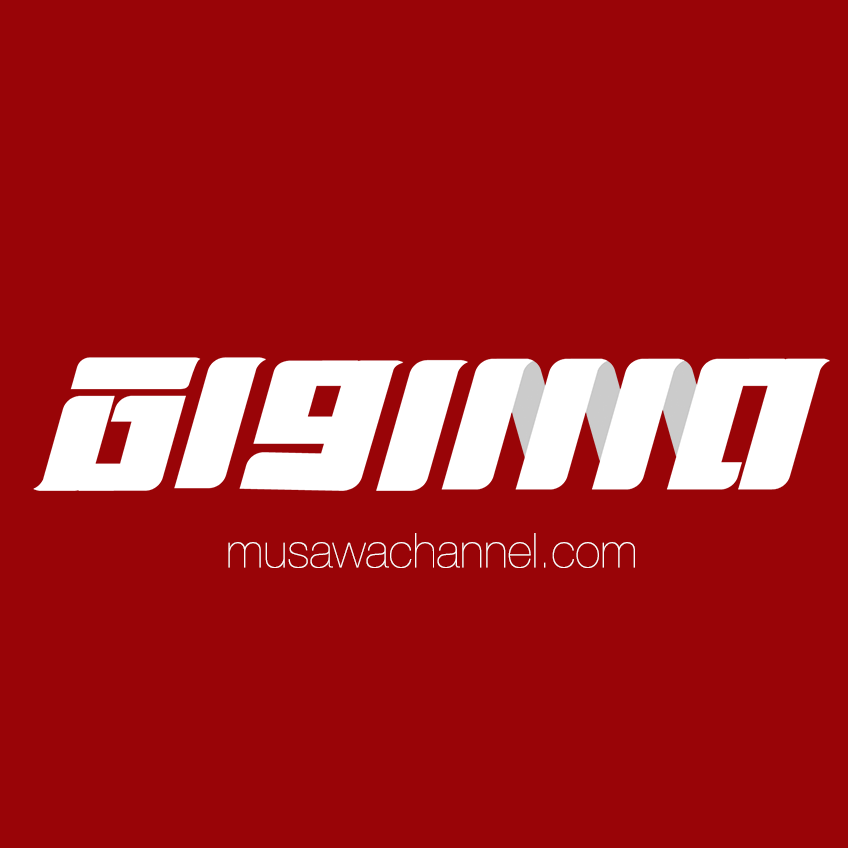

Programming
- Language: Arabic

Links
- Website: www.musawachannel.com (ar)

Musawa formerly Falasteen 48 is a Palestinian TV channel designated for the Arab citizens of Israel in Israel. The headquarters of the channel runs from Nazareth, and is part of Pay TV provider owned by the Palestinian Authority and the PLO. The channel began its activity in June 2015 and was inaugurated in the presence of Palestinian communications minister who made it clear that it will not be used for disseminating content against the rule of law in Israel.

Three weeks after the launch of the channel, the Israeli Minister of Communications, Gilad Erdan, signed an order based on the 1994 interim agreement, which will be valid for six months, that prohibits any activity of the channel inside Israel.
