= Zoom News TV (Kurdish Channel) =

Television station in Iraq

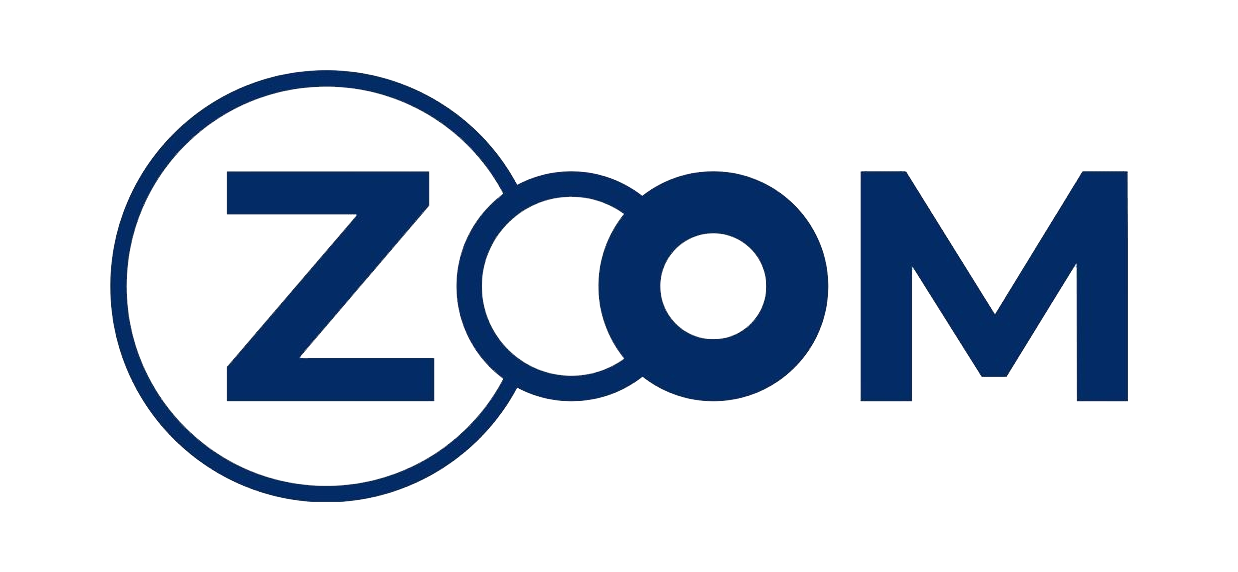
- Country: Iraq
- Broadcast area: Worldwide
- Headquarters: Baghdad

Programming
- Language: Kurdish

Ownership
- Owner: Al-Ma’adel Al-Dahabi
- Key people: CEO Hemn Mahmood

History
- Launched: June 25, 2024

Links
- Website: https://zoomnews.info/

Zoom News TV (Kurdish: زووم نیوز تیڤی | کەناڵی ئاسمانیی زووم نیوز) is a satellite news channel officially accredited by Iraq’s Communications and Media Commission (CMC) in February 2022. The network is headquartered in Baghdad, the capital of Iraq. It delivers content in multiple languages, including English, Arabic, Kurdish.

== History ==
The channel began its initial phase by publishing journalistic content on social media platforms in September 2022.

The second phase of Zoom News commenced on June 25, 2024, when the channel officially launched its broadcasts via the Nilesat and Yahsat satellites.

In addition to satellite broadcasting, Zoom News offers continuous live streaming through its platform, Zoom News Live.

The channel maintains an active presence on social media platforms, including Facebook, Instagram, X (formerly Twitter), TikTok, and YouTube.

Zoom News publishes content in Kurdish, English, and Arabic across its various platforms.

Headquartered in Baghdad, the channel also operates offices in Sulaimani, Erbil, and Duhok. It is officially accredited by the Kurdistan Regional Government (KRG).

Zoom News is owned by Al-Ma’adel Al-Dahabi, a private Iraqi company specializing in the media sector.

The channel’s motto, “We are not neutral; we stand with the people,” reflects its commitment to delivering news primarily to Kurdish, Arabic, and English-speaking audiences, covering events in Kurdistan, Iraq, and around the world.

Zoom News provides comprehensive coverage across various topics, including politics, economics, society, sports, and culture.

The channel broadcasts 16 hours a day, airing news and programs live from 08:00 AM to 12:00 AM (local time), with selected content rebroadcast until 08:00 AM the following day.

Zoom News employs approximately 150 to 200 media professionals across diverse roles, contributing to its operations and programming.
