= Zarok TV =

Turkish children's television network

- Country: Turkey
- Broadcast area: Worldwide
- Headquarters: Diyarbakir, Turkey

Programming
- Languages: Kurdish, Zaza
- Picture format: 16:9 (1080i, HDTV)

Ownership
- Owner: Başkent Vizyon Radio Television Broadcasting Corporation

History
- Launched: 21 March 2015; 11 years ago (original); November 2016; 10 years ago (relaunch)
- Closed: 29 September 2016; 10 years ago (original)

Links
- Website: www.zarok.tv

Zarok TV (English: Kid TV) is the first Kurdish satellite television station in Turkey for Kurdish children, broadcasting since 21 March 2015, based in Diyarbakır (Amed). The channel broadcasts programs in various Kurdish languages, specifically Kurmanji, being the most widely spoken Kurdish dialect in Turkey, Zazaki and some Sorani.

Accused of “separatist and subversive” activities, it was shut down on 29 September 2016 under the emergency statutory decree issued during the aftermath of 15 July's failed coup d'état, alongside 12 other television and 11 radio stations, when the police raided the television station's headquarters. Zarok TV's director, said there were no warning before the closure.

In November 2016 the TV station was allowed to broadcast again after much criticism for the sudden closure. The European Parliament condemned the Turkish authorities stating “misusing” law in the aftermath of the unsuccessful coup attempt. Owner of Zarok TV and also several other cultural Kurdish TV channels, estimated the company had lost “125-150 thousand dollars” in October due to closures.

== About ==
The director of Zarok TV stated “It is all about children, the culture, ways of life and language of the Kurds.” in addition mentioned “Cartoons that are watched everywhere in the world, dubbed into Kurdish.”. Zarok means kid/children in Kurdish.

== See also ==
- List of Kurdish-language television channels
