= Roj TV =

Kurdish television channel

- Country: Denmark

Ownership
- Owner: Mesopotamia Broadcast

History
- Launched: 1 March 2004; 22 years ago
- Closed: 3 July 2013; 13 years ago

Links
- Website: Roj TV

Roj TV (Kurdish: ڕۆژ تیڤی Roj TV or Rozh TV) was an international Kurdish satellite television station broadcasting programmes in the Kurmanji, Sorani and Hewrami dialects of the Kurdish language as well as in Persian, Zaza, Arabic, and Turkish.

== Programming ==
Roj TV broadcast from Denmark and had some office and studio facilities in Belgium. The channel transmitted on the Eurobird 9A satellite (9 Degrees East) to Europe and the Middle East on 11.843 GHz Vertical - S.Rate 27.500 and HellasSat 2 satellite 39 Degrees East on 11512 GHz Horizontal - S.Rate 27.500. Transmissions on the Hotbird satellite (13 Degrees East) ceased.

Programming on Roj TV consisted of news, political discussion programs and cultural programming (particularly music and occasional films) with a small amount of children's, entertainment and educational programming. As well as programming in various Kurdish dialects Roj TV broadcast in Turkish (aimed at both Turks and assimilated Kurds), Zaza, Persian and several other languages spoken in the region. A short weekly English news bulletin was broadcast most Saturday mornings (around 11.30 UK time) and very occasionally films with English subtitles were shown. Roj TV was accessible live through the Internet before it was shut down.

== Background ==
Kurdish-language programmes were completely forbidden from the media in Turkey from 1925 until 2002 when restrictions were relaxed somewhat. However, during this time Kurdish stations started broadcasting to Turkey via satellite from Europe. Initially there also were several Turkish language commercial satellite broadcasters established in a similar manner in response to the TRT monopoly. However, with the deregulation of broadcasting within Turkey all of these have moved their operations to within Turkey itself, and many of them have now been licensed on terrestrial frequencies.

In 2004, the national public broadcaster TRT became the first major broadcaster to broadcast a Kurdish-language programme although initially TRT only broadcast Kurdish programmes once per week, along with a handful of local TV and radio stations. These programmes were initially limited 45 minutes per day (an hour per week on TRT), are heavily censored, must include Turkish sub-titles and should not include children's programmes and any other types of educational programmes. The programmes are mostly focused on Atatürk and Turkish ancient history.

In 2008 TRT announced they were planning to launch their own full-time Kurdish-language channel TRT 6 with programming "promoting the Turkish Republic and its values as well as to counter the propaganda from the PKK channel Roj TV." On January 1, 2009, TRT 6 was officially opened with a new year's special including Kurdish singers such as Rojin. The channel has been promoted with much fanfare prior to the March 2009 local elections in Turkey, with Prime Minister Recep Tayyip Erdoğan using Kurdish at party rallies in the south east to welcome the channel.

== Predecessors: MED TV and MEDYA TV ==
MED TV was a London-based international TV whose licence was revoked on April 23, 1999, by British regulators as their broadcasts were judged as 'likely to encourage or incite crime or lead to disorder'. The Independent Television Commission imposed three fines totaling £90,000 on MED TV for three separate breaches of the requirement for due impartiality before the closure. eventually revoking their broadcasting licence amid accusations of bias on the ITC's part.

When Med TV lost its licence in the UK, MEDYA TV started transmissions from studios in Belgium via a satellite uplink from France on July 30, 1999. MEDYA TV's licence was revoked by the French authorities on February 13, 2004, the French court believed that the station had ties with the PKK; and the CSA, the French licensing authority, stated that MEDYA TV was a successor to MED-TV, and a French Appeal Court confirmed CSA's decision. The channel ran an announcement stating that "A new channel, Roj TV, will begin broadcasting on the first of the month". Roj TV began transmissions from Denmark on March 1, 2004.

Roj TV was banned from broadcasting in Germany by the German Interior Ministry in June 2008 because of the network's alleged ties with the PKK organization. Roj's production company based in Wuppertal was also dissolved. This ban was temporarily lifted by a German court on 25 February 2010.

== Controversy on Roj TV ==
The Turkish Government claimed the channel was a mouthpiece for the Kurdistan Workers' Party (PKK), which they regard as a terrorist organization (as do the U.S. and UK) and lobbied the Danish government to revoke Roj TV's broadcasting license. A Turkish Foreign Ministry official stated: "We know for sure that Roj TV is part of the PKK, a terrorist organization... [The PKK] is listed as a terrorist organization by the EU. Denmark is a member of the EU, and we would expect that the broadcasting organization of a terrorist group would not be given a free pass." While the station's general manager, Manouchehr Tahsili Zonoozi, an Iranian Kurd, acknowledges that the station maintains contact with the PKK, he characterizes it as an independent Kurdish broadcaster, which is not under the control of the PKK. The Turkish authorities repeatably made formal complaints to the Danish Radio and Television Board regarding Roj TV, but none of the complaints were upheld by the Board, who ruled that the TV channel had not violated any rules over which the Board has regulatory power.

In 2005, when the then Prime Minister of Turkey Recep Tayyip Erdoğan visited Denmark and wanted to give a press conference together with Anders Fogh Rasmussen, Erdogan refused to do so, as in the audience was also a reporter from Roj TV. Erdogan hoped Denmark would now take the Turkish demands more seriously and prohibit Roj TV. Denmark did not comply and instead defended press freedom in Denmark.

In May 2008 Germany searched the production studios of Roj TV in Wuppertal and Berlin. Following the searches, the Interior Minister declared that Roj TV was a part of the PKK and banned the channel from being active in Germany. As a response Kurds protested in several parts in Europe against the ban of the channel in Germany and the closure of the studios. Roj TV challenged the ban at a court in Leipzig, who demanded a decision from the Court of Justice of the European Union (CJEU) whether a ban of a Danish television channel could be prohibited from broadcasting in Germany. The CJEU ruled Germany was allowed to ban Roj TV from being present in Germany with offices and production studios, but it could not ban Roj TV from broadcasting into Germany from another country.

On 4 March 2010, Belgian police raided several locations including Roj TV's facilities. Belgian prosecutors said the raid was due to "very serious evidence that, in a very organised way, youngsters of Kurdish origin were recruited in western Europe, notably in Belgium". Programming was disrupted for a time but the channel returned to air.

In August 2010, Roj TV was formally indicted by the Danish attorney general for violation of Danish anti-terrorism legislation, specifically the rules against "promoting terrorist activities" of the Kurdish organization PKK. However the channel remained on air pending possible court proceedings.

In the United States diplomatic cables leak of November 2010, a diplomatic message surfaced that referred to a Turkish representative's claim that Turkey withdrew its opposition to the appointment of Anders Fogh Rasmussen to Secretary General of the NATO in exchange of the closure of Roj TV.

On 10 January 2012, a Danish court found the owners of Roj TV guilty of "promoting terrorism" and fined them 5.2 million Danish kroner ($894,800). The money would be paid in installments of DKK 65,000 for 40 months. The prosecutors claimed that the TV station was "financed and controlled" by the PKK. On 26 January 2012, Roj TV signed a broadcasting agreement with satellite provider Intelsat.

Soon after Stêrk TV was launched, which also reported about Kurdish cultural and political events.

== See also ==
- List of Kurdish-language television channels
