= AVA Media =

Kurdish TV Channel

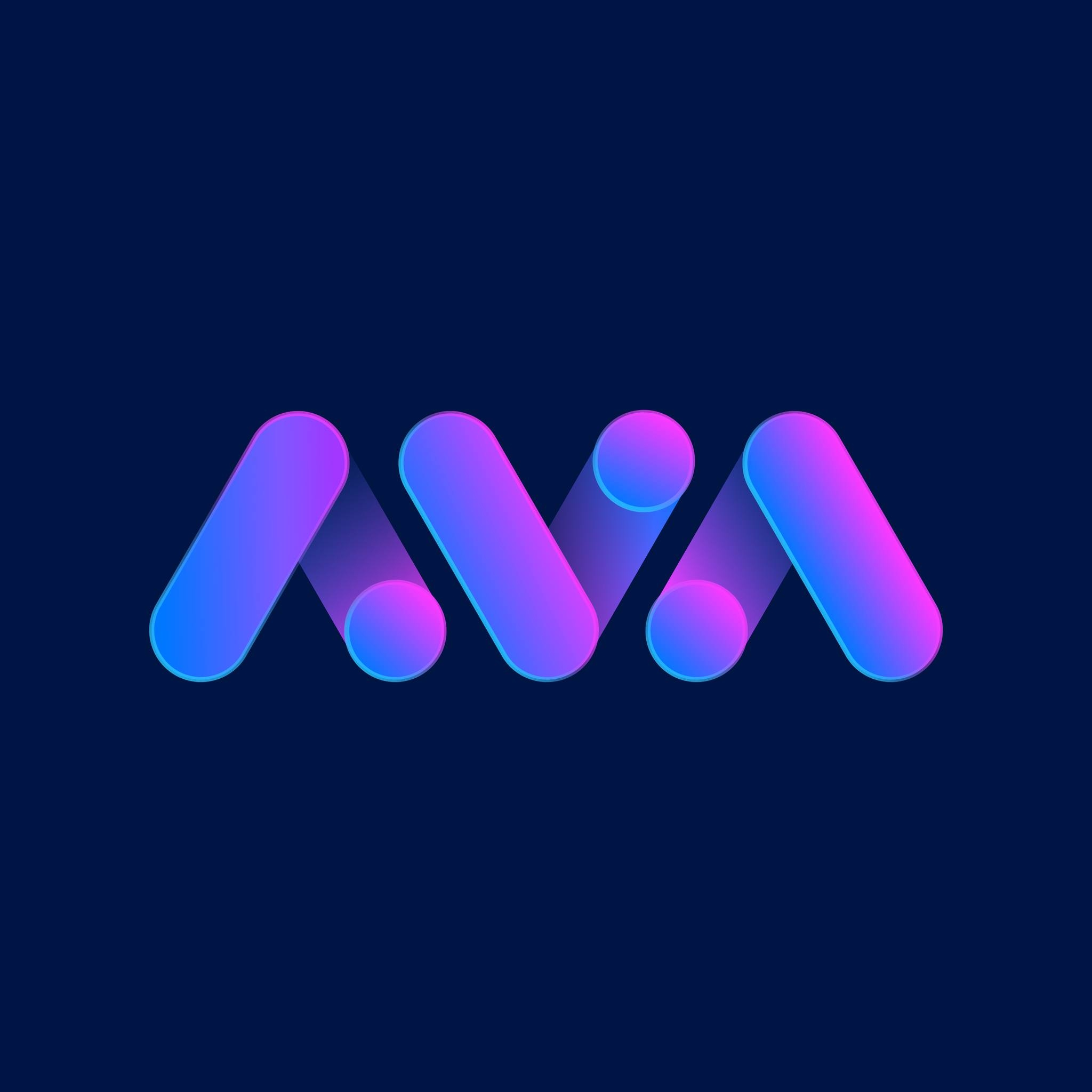
- Country: Iraq
- Broadcast area: Worldwide
- Headquarters: Erbil, Kurdistan Region, Iraq

Programming
- Languages: Kurdish (Sorani and Kurmanci) and English
- Picture format: 1080i50 (16:9 HDTV)

Ownership
- Owner: Mostafa Bayram
- Sister channels: AVA Music

History
- Launched: 20 March 2019; 7 years ago

Links
- Webcast: Live stream
- Website: www.ava.news

AVA Media is a Kurdish broadcasting station, based in Erbil, Kurdistan Region, Iraq. It started its broadcast on March 20, 2019, with television programs in the Kurdish dialects of Sorani and Kurmanci. The channel is founded and owned by Mustafa Bayram.

== Programming ==
AVA Media is an news, art and entertainment channel transmitting worldwide from the Eutelsat 7 West A on 11354 Hz Vertical, SR 27500, FEC 3/4 and Eutelsat 7C East on 11689 Hz Vertical, SR 5040, FEC 4/5. The channel airs entertainment programs based on "Kurdish culture and values", and covers entertainment events in Iraq and Kurdistan Region. AVA Entertainment offers a radio broadcast in Kurdistan. AVA Entertainment's programs and series can be accessed digitally in other parts of the world through its website and mobile apps.

== See also ==
- List of Kurdish-language television channels
