= Kurdmax Pepûle =

Television channel

- Country: Iraq
- Broadcast area: Middle East; United States
- Headquarters: Erbil, Iraq

Programming
- Language: Kurdish
- Picture format: 16:9

Ownership
- Owner: Kurdmax
- Sister channels: Kurdmax, Kurdmax Show, Kurdmax Music

History
- Launched: 2014; 12 years ago

Links
- Website: www.kurdmaxpepule.tv

Availability

Kurdmax Pepûle (Kurdish: کوردماکس پەپوولە) is a Kurdish-language children television channel founded in 2014 in Kurdistan Region. It is based in Erbil, Arbil Governorate, northern Iraq.
