= Zagros TV =

Zagros TV زاگرۆس تیڤی
- Country: Iraq
- Broadcast area: Worldwide
- Headquarters: Erbil, Iraqi Kurdistan

Programming
- Language: Arabic
- Picture format: (1920x1080, Full HD) - Free

Ownership
- Owner: Kurdistan Democratic Party

History
- Launched: March 3, 2007

Links
- Website: zagrosnews.net/ar

Availability

Streaming media
- Zagros TV: Live stream
- Z radio: Live stream

Zagros TV (Arabic: قناة زاكروس الفضائية). (Kurdish: زاگرۆس تیڤی) is a Kurdish language satellite television station in Iraqi Kurdistan, broadcasting since 2007. It belongs to the Kurdistan Democratic Party (KDP) and is based in Erbil.

As of June 2008, per a BBC Monitoring interview, the station employed 250 staff in Kurdistan and abroad. It received financial aid from KDP, but at the time it was not enough to cover all costs. Its two sources of income are from advertising and program production. Despite operating under KDP's framework, its operation was still relatively independent.

The station takes its name from the Zagros Mountains.

== See also ==
- Television in Iraq
- List of Kurdish-language television channels
