= Asia Network Television =

Iraqi satellite TV Channel

Asia Network Television قناة آسيا الفضائية
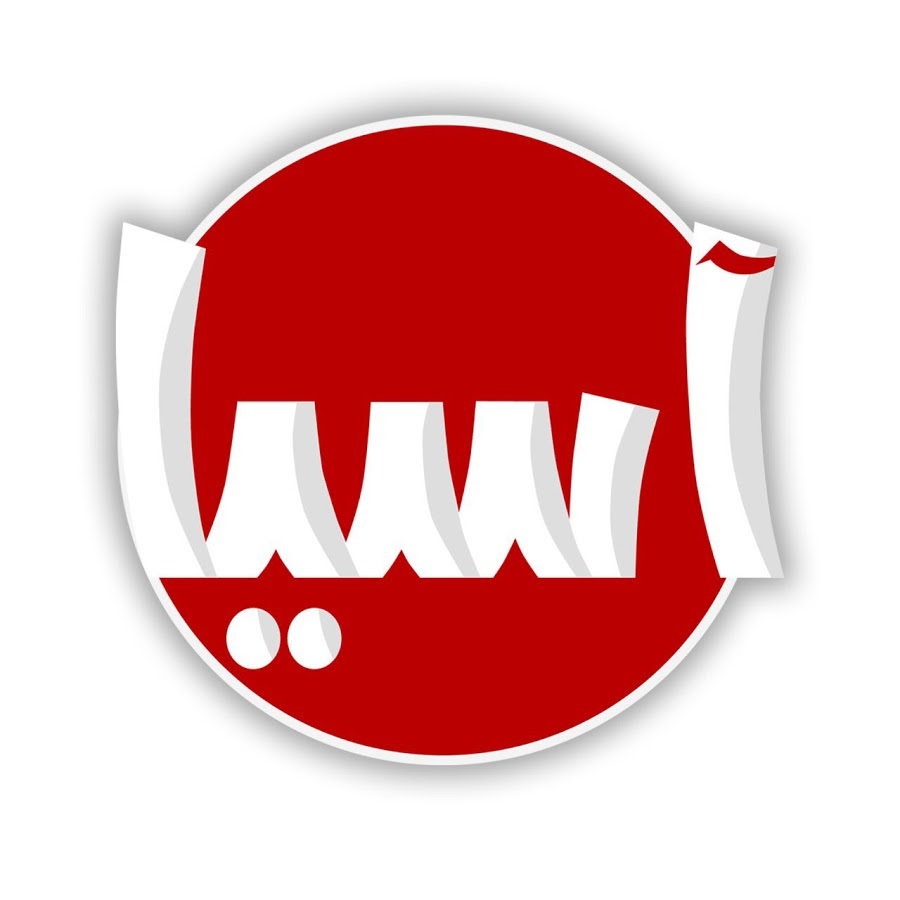
- Country: Iraq
- Broadcast area: Worldwide, via satellite and internet

Programming
- Languages: English, Arabic

Ownership
- Key people: Thaeer Jead Alhasnawi ثائر جياد الحسناوي

History
- Launched: 2012

Links
- Website: www.asiasat.tv

Availability

Streaming media
- Live stream: www.sumeronline.com/tv/Asia-tv.html

Asia Network Television (Arabic: قناة آسيا الفضائية), often called Asia TV, is an Iraqi satellite television channel based in Baghdad, Iraq that was launched in 2012. The Executive director is Thaeer Jead Alhasnawi (ثائر جياد الحسناوي) since June 2020.

== Programs ==
Asia Network Television broadcasts many programs, most notably:

- Talaba
- Stadium
- Almnawora
- Swalef
- Besaraha

== See also ==
- Television in Iraq
