= Kurdsat =

Kurdsat Broadcasting Corporation
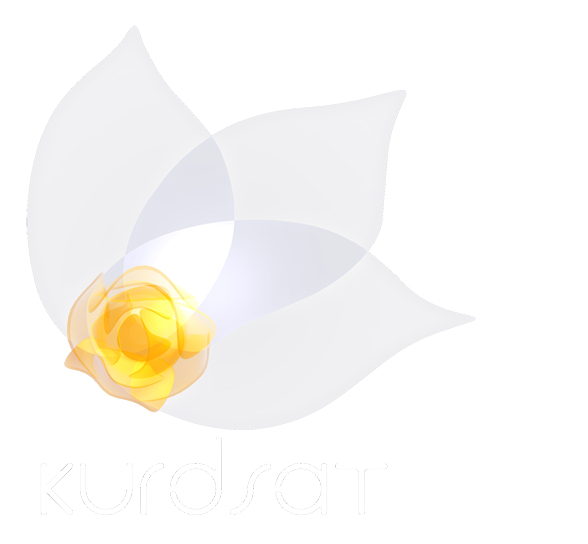
- Country: Iraq
- Broadcast area: Worldwide
- Headquarters: Dabashan, Sulaymaniyah, Kurdistan Region, Iraq

Programming
- Language: Kurdish
- Picture format: 576i (16:9 SDTV); 1080i (HDTV)

Ownership
- Owner: Patriotic Union of Kurdistan

History
- Launched: 1 January 2000

Links
- Website: www.kurdsat.tv

Availability

Streaming media
- Kurdsat

Kurdsat Broadcasting Corporation (Kurdish: کوردسات, romanized: Kurdsat) is a satellite television station in Kurdistan Region, Iraq, broadcasting since 8 January 2000. It belongs to the Patriotic Union of Kurdistan (PUK) and is based in Sulaymaniyah.

The channel broadcast programs in Kurdish. Other languages such as Persian, English and Arabic were also used in some programs with Kurdish subtitles. First established following the Gulf War, Kurdsat was among the Kurdish satellite stations in Kurdistan.

Kurdsat's headquarters is at Dabashan - As Sulaymaniyah.

== See also ==
- List of Kurdish-language television channels
