= Karbala TV =

Iraqi TV channel

Karbala TV قناة كربلاء الفضائية
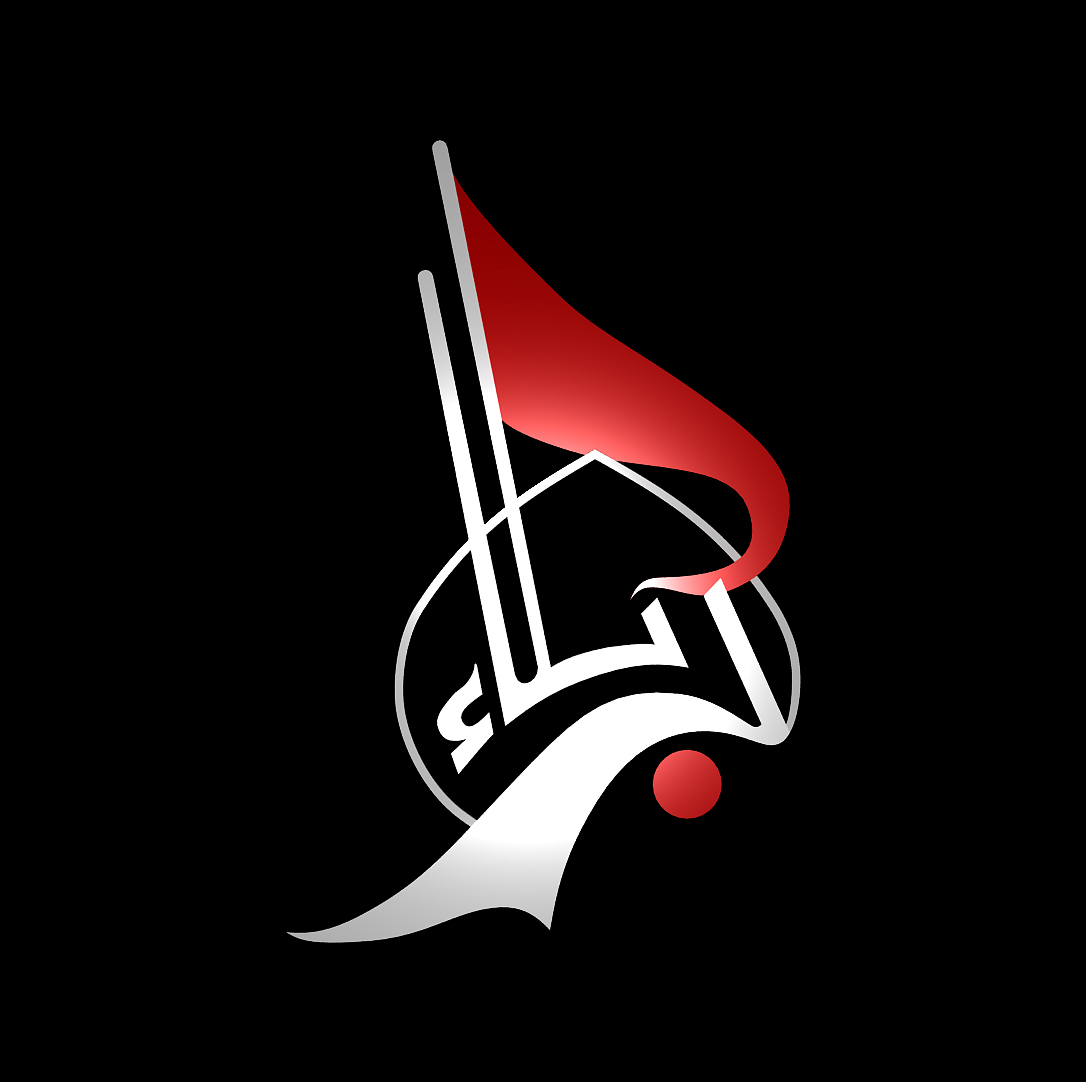
- Country: Iraq
- Broadcast area: Worldwide, via satellite and internet
- Headquarters: Karbala, Iraq

Programming
- Languages: English, Arabic
- Picture format: 1080i (HDTV) (downscaled to letterboxed 576i for SDTV feed)

History
- Launched: 2008

Links
- Website: www.karbala-tv.iq

Availability

Streaming media
- Live stream: www.karbala-tv.iq/live.php

Karbala TV (Arabic: قناة كربلاء الفضائية) is a Shia Islam television channel based in Iraq working under imam Hussein Media Group. It is the official television of the Imam Husayn Shrine in the city of Karbala, Iraq. It was founded in 2008 in the city of Karbala, Iraq, with the support of the Shia Endowment Bureau and guidance of the Supreme Religious Authority, headed by Ayatullah Sayyid Ali al-Sistani. Karbala TV is a multi-platform media organization that produces content for television, mobile devices, or through the net. The channel has over 50 video journalists worldwide.

The station's stated goals include promoting Islam and the Imam Husayn Shrine, and ecumenical engagement on science and culture with other religions.

== See also ==
- Television in Iraq
