= NRT News =

NRT HD
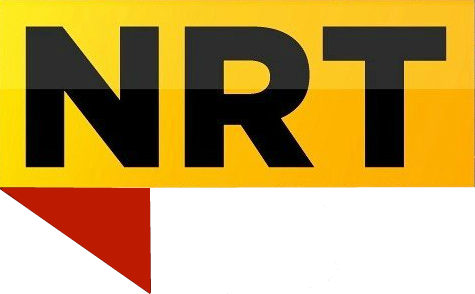
- Broadcast area: Iraq
- Headquarters: Sulaymaniyah, Kurdistan Region, Iraq

Programming
- Picture format: 1080i (HDTV)

Ownership
- Owner: Nalia Media Corporation
- Sister channels: NRT 2 NRT 3 NRT 4

History
- Launched: 2010; 16 years ago

Links
- Webcast: Live Stream t.me/nrttvofficial
- Website: www.nrttv.com

Nalia Radio and Television (NRT) is a media network in the Kurdistan Region. It was founded in 2010 by Shaswar Abdulwahid.

Shaswar Abdulwahid Qadir is the owner and founder of Nalia Media Corporation and is built under the slogan of ‘Courage, Balance and Truth.’
