= Kurd1 Channel =

Kurd1 Channel / Kurd Yek
- Broadcast area: Europe, North Africa, Middle East
- Headquarters: Paris, France

Programming
- Language: Kurdish

History
- Launched: 27 April 2009; 17 years ago
- Closed: 31 December 2012; 13 years ago

Links
- Website: www.kurd1.com

Kurd1 Channel (Kurd Yek) was an independent Kurdish satellite channel broadcasting from France and was founded by Kendal Nezan, head of the Kurdish Institute of Paris. Its European studios were based in France, Germany and Sweden. It started its broadcast on April 27, 2009 and ended December 31, 2012 due to economic reasons.

== Programming ==
Kurd1 Channel gave space in its programming to news, cinema sport for the Kurds. Several agreements have already been made with 20th Century Fox and Granada International to acquire broadcasting rights. Kurd1 also enjoys the support of Canal France International (CFI), of Mediatoon International. Nevertheless, Kurd1 produces a substantial part of its programmes itself.
