= Shaswar Abdulwahid =

Kurdish businessman and politician

- شاسوار عەبدولواحید قادر
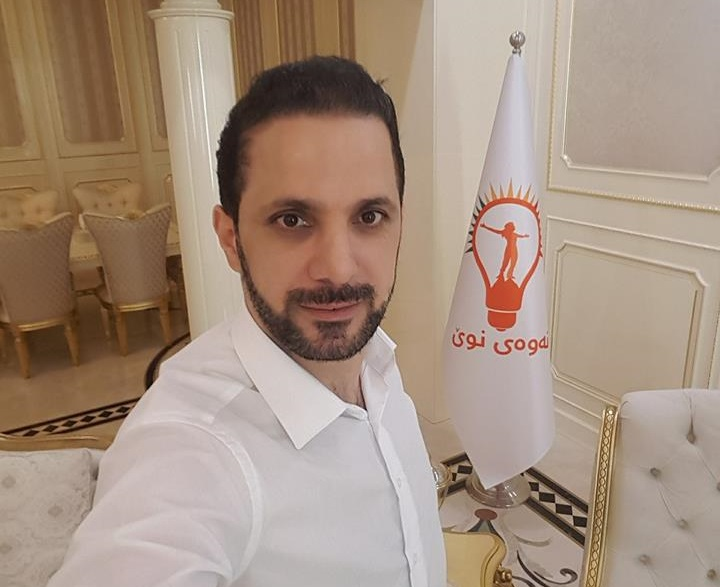
- Abdulwahid in 2022

Leader of the New Generation Movement
- Incumbent
- Assumed office 5 January 2018
- Preceded by: Party established

Personal details
- Born: 2 December 1978 (age 47)
- Party: New Generation Movement
- Relatives: Sarwa Abdulwahid (sister)
- Occupation: Founder of NRT News Chairman and founder of the New Generation Movement (Kurdistan), founder and owner of Chavyland (Amusement Park), NRT, and Kurd News TV Channel

Shaswar Abdulwahid (Sorani Kurdish: شاسوار عەبدولواحید, romanized: Şaswar Ebdulwahîd; born 2 December 1978) is an Iraqi Kurdish businessman and politician, leader of New Generation Movement and the founder of NRT media.

== Business ==
Shaswar founded the Nalia Media Corporation conglomerate, one of the biggest media organisations in Kurdish Iraq, which operates NRT News, several television stations, "real estate" and a theme park.

== Kurdistan referendum 2017 ==
Abdulwahid entered politics in 2017, during the Kurdistan Region's independence referendum. Shaswar launched a "No for now". He called the referendum as "an excuse by Kurdish leaders to remain in power".

== New Generation Movement ==
Abdulwahid was elected president of the newly established New Generation Movement at its first congress. New Generation secured eight seats in the 2018 Kurdistan parliamentary election, and won four seats in the 2018 Iraqi parliamentary election. Abdulwahid said that "there should be an opposition in parliament", and did not plan to join a governing coalition.

== Arrests ==
Abdulwahid appeared in court in Sulaimani on 3 March 2019 and arrested after being summoned on charges related to Articles 229 and 434 of the Iraqi penal code. Abdulwahid had been previously arrested in 2017.

On 12 August 2025, Iraqi News Agency reported that Abdulwahid had been arrested in Sulaymaniyah. According to his sister, Sarwa, “a group affiliated with Bafel Talabani and Qubad Talabani, and in coordination with Masrur Barzani, kidnapped Abdulwahid without announcing his place of detention”.

== Assassination attempt ==
Abdulwahid survived an assassination attempt but was injured in his leg in October 2013 before entering political life. At that time, Abdulwahid said, "I am not a politician or a famous figure in politics in Kurdistan region of Iraq. I have no private connections with any politicians or political parties, the only reason that they wanted to kill me is my ownership of NRT TV, as we have been facing many other terrible events in the past three years".
