= New Generation Movement =

New Generation Movement جوڵانه‌وه‌ی نه‌وه‌ی نوێ
- Leader: Shaswar Abdulwahid Qadir
- Founder: Shaswar Abdulwahid Qadir
- Founded: 28 September 2017; 9 years ago
- Headquarters: Sulaymaniyah, Kurdistan Region, Iraq
- Ideology: Liberal democracy; Populism; Youth politics; Economic liberalism; Anti-corruption
- Council of Representatives: 3 / 329
- Kurdistan Region Parliament: 15 / 100

Website
- www.ngmovement.com

The New Generation Movement (Kurdish: جووڵانەوەی نەوەی نوێ, romanized: Cûlanewey Newey Nwê) is a liberal political party in the Kurdistan Region of Iraq, founded by Shaswar Abdulwahid in 2017. The party was established to contest the 2018 general election.

The movement positions itself as an alternative to established political groups, advocating for political reform, transparency, and addressing economic and social issues. Its platform includes a focus on anti-corruption, economic liberalization, and social tolerance. The party advocates for women's rights and encourages their participation in both business and education.

== Election results ==
=== Council of Representatives elections ===
In the 2021 Iraqi parliamentary election, the movement succeeded in winning 9 seats in the parliament, including Sirwe Abdulwahîd.

Election	Leader	Votes	%	Seats	+/–	Position	Government
2018	Shaswar Abdulwahid	170,919	1.65%	4 / 329	New	▲11th	Opposition
2021	Shaswar Abdulwahid	233,834	2.64%	9 / 329	▲5	▲8th	Opposition
2025	Shaswar Abdulwahid	139,247	1.24%	3 / 329	▼6	▼20th	TBA

=== Kurdistan region ===
In its first participation in the Kurdistan parliamentary elections, The movement won eight seats. In the second round of elections, the party won 15 seats

Election	Votes	%	Seats	+/–	Position	Government
2018	107,610	8,6%	8 / 111	▲8	▲4th	Opposition
2024	292,032	15.5%	15 / 100	▲7	▲3rd	Opposition

== Controversies ==
On 22 April 2019, the party's Supreme Council and two prominent members of the Iraqi Parliament, Rabûn Merûf and Serkewt Şemsuldîn published a statement on Facebook, which, among others, read 'The New Generation has been shifted from a political movement different from the dominant political model to a political band in which all of its institutions and the important decision-making bodies have been marginalized.' They also stated that the New Generation Movement 'no longer enjoys collective decision making'. They accused the party leadership of getting 'involved in business and family to the extent that it is difficult to separate.' Abdulwahid named his sister, Sarwa Abdulwahid, head of party relations in a move that was heavily criticized.

On 25 April 2019, the Supreme Council of the New Generation Movement suspended two of their 'high-profile members' who publicly criticized the party. On the same day, a 'high-level official' of the Movement was arrested by the Sulaymaniyah police, following a complaint by Şadî Newzad, a New Generation MP in the Kurdistan Parliament. She accused the New Generation Movement's leader, Şaswar Abdulwahîd, and some factions within the party of blackmailing her and other lawmakers by circulating nude videos.

Still on the same day, New Generation leader Shashwar Abdulwahîd disputed the accusations of mixing the family, politics and business, and accused the dissident members of the party of 'betraying' him, while speaking from London where he received medical care. He also went on rejecting claims about the lack of collective decision making, saying 'Why didn't they say the decisions were unilateral when I made decisions to make them lawmakers and heads of caucuses?'. Furthermore, he stated 'We have seventeen offices within New Generation: none of my family members are in charge of those offices.' He also hinted about possible KDP (Kurdish Democratic Party, the largest party currently in the Kurdistan Parliament) and PUK (Patriotic Union of Kurdistan involvement, the largest party in Iraq's Sulaymaniyah Governorate); 'This is a disgusting plan by both parties in power, which are the Patriotic Union of Kurdistan in Silêmanî and the Kurdistan Democratic Party in Erbil', he said, adding that he expects 'more [of the same] from both parties in the future,'.

In the following weeks, several members of the movement have been arrested including the secretary of the leader, the director of Nalia group (founded by Abdulwehîd) and social media staff members. Some political parties outside the PUK and KDP condemned the arrests, including the Kurdistan Islamic Group (Komel) the Kurdistan Islamic Union (Yekgirtû), and The Freedom Movement of Kurdistan Society (Tevgera Azad).

On 10 May 2019, four arrested members of the New Generation said Abdulwahîd ordered them to threaten Şadî Newzad. They also claimed that the Movement has two social media departments; one that administrates and manages the official social media pages, and the other that uses non-direct accounts and pages to attack political leaders.

On the same day, Abdulwahîd reacted with stating that the Silêmanî Asayiş (which detained the party members and released their confessions) are to blame because they want to 'target and defame' the Movement. He added that 'When we took this path we knew that it is a difficult path. We also knew that changing a system or toppling a KDP and PUK establishment in Kurdistan is not easy'. He stated that 'We will continue and not give up'.

On 16 May 2019, Shashwar Abdulwahîd was detained after appearing in a Sulaymaniyah court.

Later, it was stated that Abdulwahîd had gone on a hunger strike, with his health 'unstable' by 22 May 2019.

On 12 August 2025, Iraqi News Agency reported that Abdulwahid had been arrested in Sulaymaniyah. According to his sister, Sarwa, “a group affiliated with Bafel Talabani and Qubad Talabani, and in coordination with Masrour Barzani, kidnapped Abdulwahid without announcing his place of detention”.
