= Vîn TV =

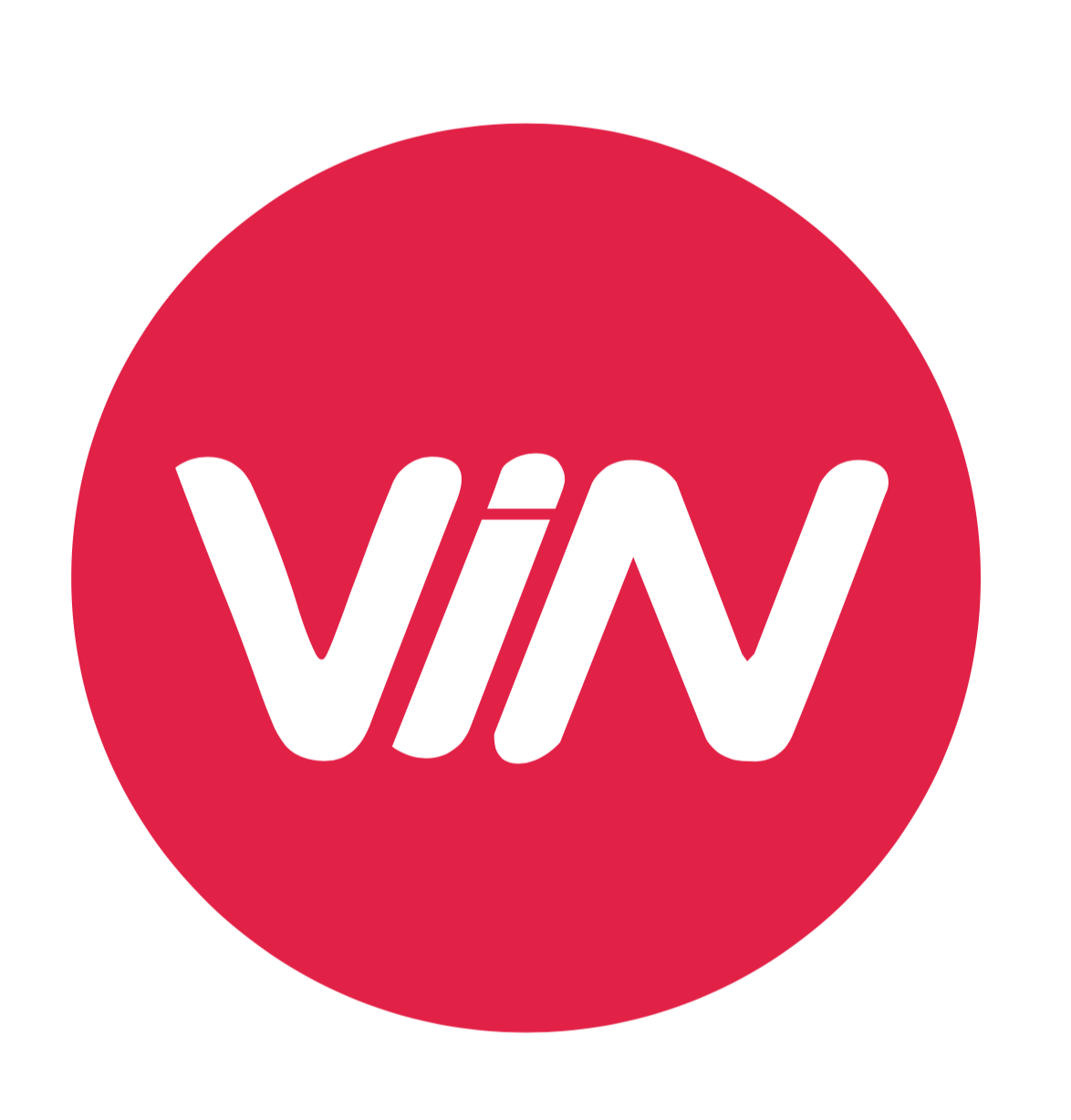
- Country: Kurdistan Region, Iraq
- Broadcast area: Middle East
- Headquarters: Erbil, Iraq

Programming
- Languages: Kurdish, Arabic
- Picture format: 4:3 (576i, SDTV)

Ownership
- Owner: Sarkat Junad Rekani and Kawa Junad Rekani
- Sister channels: VIN FM 99.5, VIN production, Ngci Group.

History
- Launched: March 3, 2007

Links
- Website: vintv.net (kurdish) (Vin Live)

Availability

Streaming media
- Vîn TV: Vin TV Live

Vîn TV (Kurdish: ڤین تیڤی) is a satellite television channel founded in 2007. Broadcasting from Duhok Province in Kurdistan Region, Iraq, it is now considered one of the most popular Kurdish music channels in the world. Boasting over 150 artists signed so far they have contributed significantly to the Kurdish music scene for Kurds around the world. It broadcasts Kurdish music and cultural programs, 24 hours a day. The name Vîn in Kurdish means Love.

Vin TV is a subsidiary company of Vin Group. Vin Group includes Vin TV (satellite), Vin Productions (music production/distribution), NV (video production), Vin FM (radio), and Next Generation Communications (NGC, a mobile value added service subsidiary).

Vin Group was founded by Sarkat Junad Rekani and Kawa Junad Rekani. Sarkat Junad Rekani is sitting CEO and Kawa Junad Rekani is chairman.
