= Zaro TV =

Kurdish children's TV channel

- Country: Iraq
- Broadcast area: Nationwide
- Headquarters: Erbil

Ownership
- Owner: MoCY, Kurdistan Regional Government (KRG)

History
- Launched: 22 December 2013

Links
- Website: www.zarotv.com

Zaro TV (Kurdish: زارۆ تيڤى), is an official Kurdish children's television channel. It is owned by the Kurdistan Regional Government (KRG), broadcasting using DVB-T.

== History ==
Zaro TV was launched on 22 December 2013. The founder, general manager Halgurd Jundiany, told the media about the steps of broadcasting Zaro TV: "Production of local shows and programs is being started since summer of 2013." "We are waiting for our shows and programs to reach a total of 250 hours to start broadcasting officially."

== Programming ==
The channel produces an animated show.

== Organization ==
The new channel comprises local and foreign professional employees. It has studios and branches in Sulaimani, Duhok. Zaro TV is under the Ministry of Culture and Youth MoCY/General Directorate of Information and Publishing. Financially, it receives funds from the general budget of the ministry. Zaro TV has attempted to collaborate with UNICEF and UNESCO to acquire with financial and administrative support.
