= Kanal4 =

Kanal 4 Television Network Ltd.
- Country: Iraq
- Broadcast area: Middle East
- Headquarters: Erbil, Kurdistan Region

Programming
- Language: Kurdish

History
- Launched: September 2009

Links
- Website: Kanal 4

Availability

Streaming media
- Kanal 4: Live stream

Kanal4 (Kurdish: کەناڵ ٤, Kanal 4) is an entertainment television channel based in Erbil, Kurdistan Region.

== External links and references ==
- kanal4.net
- Frequencies
- Article on Prosave
