= Kurdistan TV =

Kurdish-language television channel in Iraqi Kurdistan

- Type: Satellite television channel
- Country: Kurdistan Region, Iraq
- Headquarters: Erbil, Kurdistan Region

Programming
- Languages: Kurdish, Arabic, Turkish

Ownership
- Owner: Kurdistan Democratic Party

History
- Launched: 1 January 1999

Links
- Webcast: www.kurdistantv.net/ku/live
- Website: www.kurdistantv.net

Kurdistan TV (Kurdish: کوردستان تیڤی) is a Kurdish-language television channel launched in 1999 in Iraqi Kurdistan. It is the second Kurdish-language TV channel established in the region. The station is owned by the Kurdistan Democratic Party (KDP) and is headquartered in Erbil, Kurdistan Region, Iraq.

The channel broadcasts programs mainly in Kurdish and can be viewed using a WS International satellite system. It transmits on the Eutelsat for Europe, Western Asia and North Africa.

Apart from its Kurdish language services, Kurdistan TV also offers an online news presence in Arabic and Turkish. Kurdistan TV's European offices are based in the Netherlands and Germany.

== See also ==
- List of Kurdish-language television channels
