= Kurdish News Network =

- Headquarters: Sulaimaniya, Kurdistan Region

Programming
- Language: Kurdish
- Picture format: SDTV

Ownership
- Owner: Wusha Corp, Gorran Movement

History
- Launched: October 2008

Links
- Website: www.knnc.net

Kurdish News Network (KNN) (Kurdish: کەی ئێن ئێن), is a Kurdish language news television network founded in 2008 by Nawshirwan Mustafa, the leader of the Change Movement political party. It is operated by the Wusha Corporation and based in Sulaymaniyah.

== Programmes ==
- News - Covering the top Kurdish and international news stories
- Headlines - A brief overview of the main news stories
- Business - Financial news
- Markets - News on the world stock markets and commodity prices
- Press - A look at the front pages of various titles every morning
- Sport - Top sports stories
- Weather - forecasting
- Interview - An interview with a noted individual
- Debate - A head-to-head debate
- Parliament - News about the Kurdish Parliament
- Comment - Interviews with thinkers, innovators and opinion leaders
