= Islamic Radio and Television Union =

Iranian IRGC group

- Abbreviation: IRTVU
- Formation: 2007
- Founder: Ministry of Culture and Islamic Guidance
- Type: Media organization
- Legal status: Active
- Affiliations: Islamic Revolutionary Guard Corps (IRGC)
- Website: irtvu.co

The Islamic Radio and Television Union (IRTVU) (Persian: اتحادیه رادیو و تلویزیون‌های اسلامی) is an organization established in Iran that operates as a coalition of Iranian proxy media outlets across various countries. Closely aligned with the Islamic Revolutionary Guard Corps (IRGC), IRTVU serves as an instrument of Iranian soft power and ideological influence, particularly within the Middle East.

== History and structure ==
IRTVU was established in 2007 by Iran's Ministry of Culture and Islamic Guidance to strengthen Iran's influence over regional media and to promote pro-Iranian narratives.

The IRTVU is de facto run by the Islamic Revolutionary Guard Corps (IRGC). Officially, it is governed through three primary bodies:

- Supreme Council – Comprising 13 members, as of 2021 chaired by Mudher al-Baka, general manager of Iraq's Alghadeer TV.
- General Secretariat – Based in Tehran, as of 2021 led by cleric Ali Karimian, who has strong ties to the office of the Supreme Leader of Iran.
- Permanent Committees – These include the political and news, training, production, technical and broadcast services, and radio committees.

As of March 2021, the organization had over 210 affiliated entities in 35 countries.

== Activities ==
IRTVU has been generally described as a propaganda or soft power tool for the Iranian regime and its regional militias. Its content has been noted as promoting sectarian violence and division. Notably, not all IRTVU-affiliated channels are directly controlled by the IRGC, with some being apolitical or not espousing the "axis of resistance" ideology of other IRTVU outlets.

In August 2015, IRTVU launched a media certification initiative called "Halal Media", recognizing television and film productions that promote "pure" Islamic values. The initiative was introduced during the General Assembly meeting in Tehran and included participation from media entities in Iran, Iraq, Lebanon, Turkey, Pakistan, and other Islamic countries.

=== Regional affiliates ===
The IRTVU is most active in Iraq and Lebanon, but also operates in countries such as Yemen, Syria, Saudi Arabia, and Bahrain.

==== Iraqi Radio and Television Union ====
The Iraqi Radio and Television Union operates as an Iraqi affiliate of IRTVU. It was founded in 2012 and held its first major conference in Baghdad in 2013. Its head, Hamid al-Husseini, is a cleric with close ties to the IRGC and Iranian leadership.

The Iraqi branch supports several militia-run media outlets through funding, training, and logistical support, including those run by groups such as Kata'ib Hezbollah and Harakat Hezbollah al-Nujaba. According to Hamdi Malik of the Washington Institute, outlets supported by the Iraqi Radio and Television Union include Al-Etejah TV, run by Kata'ib Hezbollah; Al-Ahad TV, run by Asa'ib Ahl al-Haq; Al-Nujaba TV, run by Harakat Hezbollah al-Nujaba; and al-Baeenah, run by Saraya al-Jihad.

=== U.S. sanctions and website seizures ===
In October 2020, the United States Department of the Treasury designated IRTVU as a Specially Designated National (SDN) for being owned or controlled by the IRGC-Quds Force and accused it of spreading disinformation and influence operations.

On June 22, 2021, the U.S. government seized 33 websites operated by IRTVU for violating U.S. sanctions. Affected sites included prominent Iranian state media like Press TV and Al-Alam.

== Members ==
As of October 2026, IRTVU's website listed the following media entities as members.

=== Afghanistan ===
- Noor TV
- Rah-e-Farda
- Tamadon TV

=== Bahrain ===
- LuaLua TV

=== India ===
- WIN TV

=== Iran ===
==== Islamic Republic of Iran Broadcasting ====
  - Al-Alam News Network
  - Al-Kawthar TV
  - IRIB TV1
  - IRIB TV2
  - IRIB TV3
  - IRIB TV5
  - Islamic Republic of Iran News Network
  - Jame Jam TV
  - Press TV
  - Sahar TV
- Al-Ahvaz TV
- Al-Thaqalayn TV
- HodHod TV
- Saamen TV
- Velayat TV

=== Iraq ===
- Afaq TV
- Alahad TV
- Alanwar TV (Note: Iraqi channel based in the United Kingdom.)
- Al-Eshraq TV
- Aletejah TV
- Al Forat
- Alghadeer TV
- Al-Hadath News
- Al-Hujjah TV
- Al-Jawadain TV
- Al-Masar Al-Oula TV
- Al-Naeem TV
- Al-Nujaba TV
- Al-Salam TV
- Asia Network Television
- Beladi TV
- Dua Channel
- HadiTV (Note: International channel primarily based in Iraq.)
- Karbala TV
- Payam TV
- Speda TV

=== Kuwait ===
- Al-Maaref TV

=== Lebanon ===
- Al-Iman TV
- Al-Manar
- Al-Sirat TV
- Athabat Network
- Taha TV

=== Pakistan ===
- Such TV

=== Palestine ===
- Al-Aqsa TV
- Al-Quds TV
- Hona Al-Quds TV
- Palestine Today TV

=== Russia ===
- İnterAz TV

=== Syria ===
- Noor Al-Sham

=== Tanzania ===
- IBN TV

=== Tunisia ===
- Zitouna TV

=== Turkey ===
- Kudüs TV
- Rehber TV
- TV5 (Turkey)

=== United Kingdom ===
- Ahlulbayt TV
- Hidayat TV
- Nabaa TV

=== United States ===
- Velayat TV USA

=== Yemen ===
- Al-Masirah
- Al-Sahat TV
