= Al Ghadeer International Festival =

Iraqi festival

Al Ghadeer International Festival مهرجان الغدير الدولي
- Genre: Annual festival
- Locations: Baghdad, Iraq
- Country: Iraq
- Inaugurated: 2007
- Organizer: Badr Organization and Alghadeer TV
- Website: badr.iq

The Al Ghadeer International Festival (Arabic: مهرجان الغدير الدول), abbreviated AGIF, is one of the largest festivals in MENA to the media.

== History ==
The festival was launched in 2007 by the Badr Organization and Alghadeer TV. It is one of the biggest annual media festivals in the region, featuring personalities, institutions, satellite channels and radio stations.

== Awards ==
The most prominent awards are :

- Best Website Award The prize went to Al-Alam News Network - Iran (2017)
- Best long dramatic action Love and betrayal{Film} - Iran (2017)
- Best short dramatic action Paradise is under the dark - Iraq (2017)
- Best political program Hot issue (Qadia Sakhina) - Al-Kawthar TV - Iran (2017)
- Best investigative program What if (Matha Loo) -Alahad TV - Iraq (2017)
- Best open and varied periods Program on the door of God (Ala Bab Alaah)- Alghadeer TV - Iraq (2017)
- Best women programsViolence against women - Aliman TV - Lebanon (2017)
- Best TV Break A break in the name of the "army" - Naeem TV - Iraq (2017)
- Best for field mediaA break in the name of the living at their Lord - Al-Manar - Lebanon (2017)
- Best animation action (3D)Water master film - Al Abbas Mosque - Iraq (2017)
- The best animation action (2D) Our animated characters - Karbala TV - Iraq (2017)
- Best Animation Videocraff Naturalization - Allowloa Satellite Channel - Bahrain (2017)
- Best DocumentaryYADKAR DUMA - Almostanad TV - Iran (2017)
- Best Documentary (2) Bagh Baber - Tamden TV - Afghanistan (2017)
- Best action to counter radicalism and terrorism The Devil 's Horn - Aletejah TV Iraq (2017)
- The best work about Jerusalem Jerusalem Concerns - "Sun Light Production" - Palestine (2017)
- The best drama series Conscience - General Authority of Syrian Radio (2017)
- The best radio program Allowlo Revolution - "Radio Al Kawthar" - Iraq (2017)
- Best radio songMen of Time - Imam Husayn Shrine - Iraq (2017)
- Best Radio Break Break of Martyrs' Day - Basra Voice Radio - Iraq (2017)
- The best integrated newspaper Ad-Dustour (2017)
- Best radio website Public Opinion News Agency - Iraq (2017)
- The best news agency website Erem News (2017)
- The best news agency website Mehr News Agency - Iran (2017)

== See also ==
- List of festivals
