= Mohanad Najim Aleqabi =

Iraqi journalist

Mohanad Najim Aleqabi مهند العقابي
- Born: January 6, 1979 (age 47); Iraq
- Education: University of Baghdad
- Occupations: journalist, director general of the team media war of the popular mobilization forces, which is affiliated to the iraqi council of ministers & founder and ceo public opinion news agency
- Known for: Team Media War

Mohanad Najim Aleqabi (born January 6, 1979) (Arabic: مهند العقابي) is an Iraqi journalist, Director General of the Team Media War of the Popular Mobilization Forces, which is affiliated to the Iraqi Council of Ministers & Founder and CEO Public Opinion News Agency. He was born in 1979. He studied journalism at Al-Mustansiriya University in Baghdad and graduated from it. He is currently the managing director of "Rp News" (Public Opinion News Agency). He also worked for Beladi TV.A former political analyst

== Channels and institutions in which he worked ==
- Aletejah TV
- Beladi TV
- Asia Network Television
- Aliraqia TV
- Alghadeer TV
- Public Opinion News Agency. And more

== See also ==
- Popular Mobilization Forces
- Team Media War
