= Mechid TV =

Pakistani Hazaragi language television channel

- Country: Pakistan
- Broadcast area: Quetta, Pakistan
- Headquarters: Quetta, Pakistan

Programming
- Language(s): Hazaragi

History
- Launched: 2010

Mechid TV is a private television channel of Hazara people based in Quetta, Pakistan.

== See also ==
- Rah-e-Farda Radio & Television Network
- Negaah TV
