= American Fugitive: The Truth About Hassan =

- Canadian film poster
- Directed by: Jean-Daniel Lafond
- Written by: Jean-Daniel Lafond
- Produced by: Nathalie Barton
- Starring: Jean-Daniel Lafond; Hassan Tantai
- Cinematography: Vahid Farouz; Alberto Feio
- Edited by: Babalou Hamelin
- Music by: Charles Papasoff
- Production company: InformAction Films
- Distributed by: InformAction Films
- Release date: 22 April 2006 (Canada)
- Running time: 75 minutes
- Countries: Canada; Iran
- Languages: Persian; English

American Fugitive: The Truth About Hassan is a film, directed by Jean-Daniel Lafond, about an exiled American political activist named Dawud Salahuddin (also known as David Belfield and Hassan Abdulrahman). Belfield has confessed to assassinating a former Iranian diplomat, who supported the shah of Iran, Mohammad Reza Pahlavi, in 1980.

Belfield unexpectedly appeared playing an exiled American political activist in the 2001 film Kandahar. Lafond then traveled to Iran to film the documentary about him.
