= Gabriel Chaim =

Brazilian photographer and documentarist (born 1981)

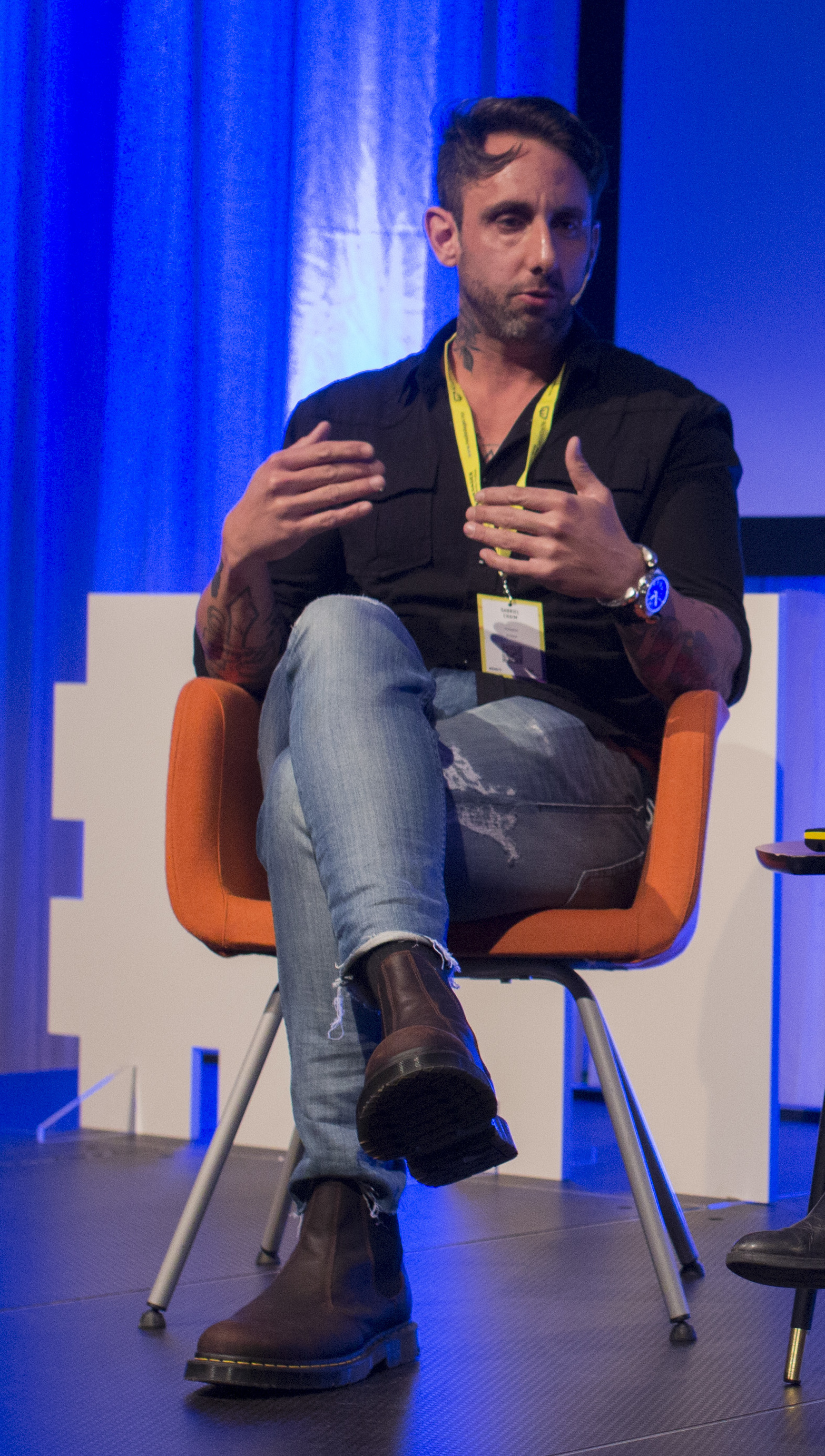
- Chaim at the 2019 Nordiske Mediedager, in Norway
- Born: 1981 (age 44–45); Oriximiná or Belém, Pará
- Occupations: Journalist, documentarist, photographer, camera operator
- Children: 2

Gabriel Chaim (born 1981 in Oriximiná or Belém, Pará) is a Brazilian journalist, documentarist, photographer and camera operator who usually works in conflict zones around the world, especially in the Middle East.

Initially working in gastronomy, Chaim wanted to photograph meals in refugee camps and became an expert in war and conflicts. He covered conflicts and refugee crises in Syria, Egypt, Iran, Iraq, Jordan and Palestine and had his contents published in outlets such as The Guardian, CNN, Der Spiegel and G1; footage captured by him with a drone in the city of Kobanî, at the border of Syria and Turkey, were displayed by Irish band U2 during their iNNOCENCE + eXPERIENCE tour in 2015. He has interviewed subjects such as Mahmoud Ahmadinejad (former president of Iran) and Volodymyr Zelenskyy (president of Ukraine). Some of his documentaries were nominated for the Emmy and the New York Festivals.

== Career ==
=== Background, pre-coverage work and other activities ===
The first career Chaim considered was in Economy, which he applied for in a college in Belém. Afterwards, he went to Rio de Janeiro, to study law, which he switched for Publicity and then Ciema. He moved to Goiânia, where he opened an ice cream shop with flavors from his native state of Pará, but it went bankrupt; he also opened a bar, which didn't succeed, either.

His next endeavor was studying gastronomy in São Paulo, in Anhembi Morumbi University. He left the course in its last semester to work in a restaurant in Spello, Italy, invited by a friend in 2011 or 2012. From there, he went to Dubai to work in a restaurant as book cook and photographer, the latter an activity he learned from his father. There, he had a better salary which allowed him to travel the world.

In the 2010s, Chaim ran the project Kitchen 4 Life with his pictures, financing it with his work in Dubai.

In 2022, he was preparing the book A Guerra de Gabriel Chaim (The War of Gabriel Chaim), with pictures he took in conflicts around the world and texts by Guga Chacra. It was expected to be released in August of that year. In 2024, he released the book Gabriel Chaim: 10 Anos de Guerras Sem Fim (Gabriel Chaim: 10 Years of Endless Wars) with previously unreleased images captioned in two languages. The work generated an homonymous exhibition at the São Paulo Museum of Image and Sound.

=== Wars and conflicts coverage ===
When on vacation from his photography course in Italy, he traveled to Iran and to refugee camps, initially willing to photograph what people were eating. The Niatak camp in Afghanistan sparked his interest for this reality. When operating in Egypt, he witnessed the fall of Mohamed Morsi in 2013, year in which he also made it to Aleppo (unlike most journalists back then) to cover the Syrian civil war. Such experiences propelled him into his new work field.

In 2014, he photographed a woman with acid burns in Guarulhos. The picture was displayed in London, featured in a The Guardian story and an organization paid for the victim's treatment. She later moved to Germany.

On 3 May 2015, he was detained at the Syrian-Turkey border when attempting to illegally gain entrance to Syria from Urfa. Two other photographers, one German and one Turkish, were also arrested with him. He was interrogated for several hours while deprived of food, water or sleep, and then locked up with 100 other inmates, including members of the ISIS. He was released on 12 May and subsequently deported; and returned to São Paulo the next morning.

In 2020, he spent the first five months of the COVID-19 pandemic working in a hospital in Baghdad, generating material which would later become a BBC documentary.

In October 2023, while commenting live on Conexão GloboNews, he had to seek shelter in a kibbutz as the Israeli Iron Dome stepped in to protect the territory from explosives coming from Gaza.

=== Documentaries ===
On 12 December 2015, GloboNews aired his documentary Síria em Fuga (Runaway Syria), with stories of refugees of the Syrian civil war, including an interview with Alan Kurdi's father; Alan being a symbol of this humanitarian crisis. The effort won a silver medal at the New York Festivals.

In 2017, he debuted a documentary series on History Channel named Zona de Conflito (Conflict Zone), in which he narrates his work in Iraq, Syria and Turkey.

In 2019, GloboNews won the silver medal at the New York Festivals for his documentary Margens de uma Guerra: Heróis e Vítimas em Mossul (Margins of a War: Heroes and Victims in Mosul), which covers the efforts by the Iraqi Special Operations Forces to retake the city of Mosul from the ISIS and its consequences to the civilian population.

In 2022, he produced the documentary Abrigo — Inocentes sob Ataque (Shelter — Innocents under Attack), in which he tells stories of Ukrainian victims of Russian attacks as the former is invaded by the latter. The production debuted on GloboNews and was later made available on Globoplay. It won another silver medal at the New York Festivals.

By the end of 2023, also on GloboNews, he aired his documentary Evel, Hazin - Dias de Luto (Evel, Hazin - Mourning Days), with the effects of the Gaza war on the lives of Palestinian civilians. It was nominated for the International Emmy Awards Current Affairs & News.

On Christmas 2024, GloboNews aired the documentary Salma: sobre raízes e perdas (Salma: About Roots and Losses), about the Israel-Hezbollah conflicts.

=== Exhibitions ===
Chaim had some of his works exhibited on different occasions. In January 2014, his pictures of refugees of the Syrian civil war were exhibited in Belém, and later in São Paulo and Rio de Janeiro. In November 2015, other images of his taken in the Syrian war were exhibited at the Zipper Gallery in São Paulo, in a partnership with Human Rights Watch.

By the end of 2021, he had another exhibition, this time with images taken in Brazil, when he followed the Army and the Federal Police as they acted against illegal gold mining in the Yanomami Indigenous Territory between Roraima and Amazonas. One of his works, "Aldeia Roko", was auctioned in 2022 to help fund the film Jepotá.

== Personal life ==
Chaim was born to Lebanese parents. He lives in São Paulo, has two children who, in 2023, were 14 and 8 years old. He speaks English, Italian and some Arabic and Kurdish.

For safety reasons, Chaim avoids posting his personal life on social media and doesn't tell his family or friends where exactly he'll be working. When American fellow journalist Brent Renaud died in the Ukrainian war, Chaim claimed that "one death is no more important than another", criticizing the different approaches the media would use to treat different types of casualties of wars and conflicts.

In an interview om Conversa com Bial, Chaim said he struggles to go back to normality after returning from the front. He also believes seeing shocking things such as dead children through a camera lens helps alleviate the effect it could have if he saw all that directly.
