= Télédiffusion d'Algérie =

Algerian broadcaster

- Type: Public service broadcasting and internet service provider
- Industry: Mass media
- Founded: 1 July 1986; 40 years ago
- Headquarters: Bouzaréah, Algeria
- Area served: International (primarily Algeria)
- Products: Broadcasting; Radio; Internet
- Services: Television; Radio
- Owner: Government of Algeria
- Website: www.tda.dz

Algerian Broadcasting Company (Arabic: البث الإذاعي والتلفزي الجزائري; French: Télédiffusion d'Algérie) is an undertaking for the broadcasting of radio and television services in Algeria. TDA is a so-called public industrial and commercial company (EPIC), which means that it is an independent legal entity that manages a public service. TDA also offers internet, technical and satellite services. Algeria's Ministry of Communications is the supervisory authority for the TDA.

== Background and history ==
The origin of the company can be found in the 1950s, when the French authorities decided to install VHF transmitters in different cities (Tamentfoust, Oran, Constantine) for the first television broadcasts in Algeria. With the independence of the country, all these facilities became part of Radiodiffusion télévision algérienne (RTA) (English: Algerian Radio and Television Broadcasting), an organization that inherited all the facilities and technical equipment that French broadcasting had in Algiers.

On 1 July 1986, an executive decree separates the activities managed by the RTA into four autonomous bodies: a national broadcasting transmission company (TDA), a national sound broadcasting company (ENRS), a national audiovisual production company (ENPA) and a national broadcasting television company (ENTV).

The broadcasting company has around 1,860 employees and is headquartered in Bouzaréah, outside the capital Algiers. In addition, there are six regional offices in Bordj El Bahri, Constantine, Sidi Bel Abbès, Ouargla, Béchar and Tamanrasset. Previously, the technical operation was subordinate to Algeria's radio and television company ENTD, but was spun off as a separate company in 1991.

TDA is an active member of several international organizations, including the International Telecommunication Union (ITU), the European Broadcasting Union (EBU), the Arab States Broadcasting Union (ASBU), the African Union of Broadcasting (UAR) and the Islamic Radio and Television Union (IRTU).

== Management ==
=== Director General ===
- Abdelmalek Houyou ( – June 2016)
- Chawki Sahnin (June 2016 – November 2019)
- Said Boudjemadi (November 2019 – April 2021)
- Fadhila Boumeridja (since April 2021)
