= LuaLua TV =

LuaLua TV قناة اللؤلؤة
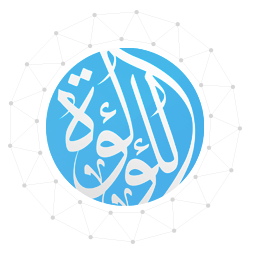
- Country: Bahrain
- Headquarters: London, United Kingdom

Programming
- Language: Arabic

History
- Launched: 2011

Links
- Website: lualuatv.net

LuaLua TV (Arabic:قناة اللؤلؤة) is a Bahraini opposition TV Channel. It started broadcasting in 2011 from London. It was named after the Pearl Roundabout. It is blocked in most Gulf Cooperation Council countries, including Bahrain.

In June 2021, Federal Bureau of Investigation and Bureau of Industry and Security seized LuaLua's domain, alongside several other websites such as Press TV, Al-Alam TV and Al-Masirah TV, citing links to Iran and therefore, violations of US sanctions. The website has since come back under a new domain. LuaLua TV was described as pro-Iran by the Foundation for Defense of Democracies and Reuters. The channel was accused of supporting Hezbollah and Hamas by broadcasting content by the militant groups, which are designated terrorist organizations in the U.K. where the channel is based. Alicia Kearns and Sir John Jenkins have called on Ofcom to suspend the channel.
