= Jean-Daniel Lafond =

French-Canadian filmmaker and former Viceregal Consort of Canada (born 1944)

Jean-Daniel Lafond CC RCA
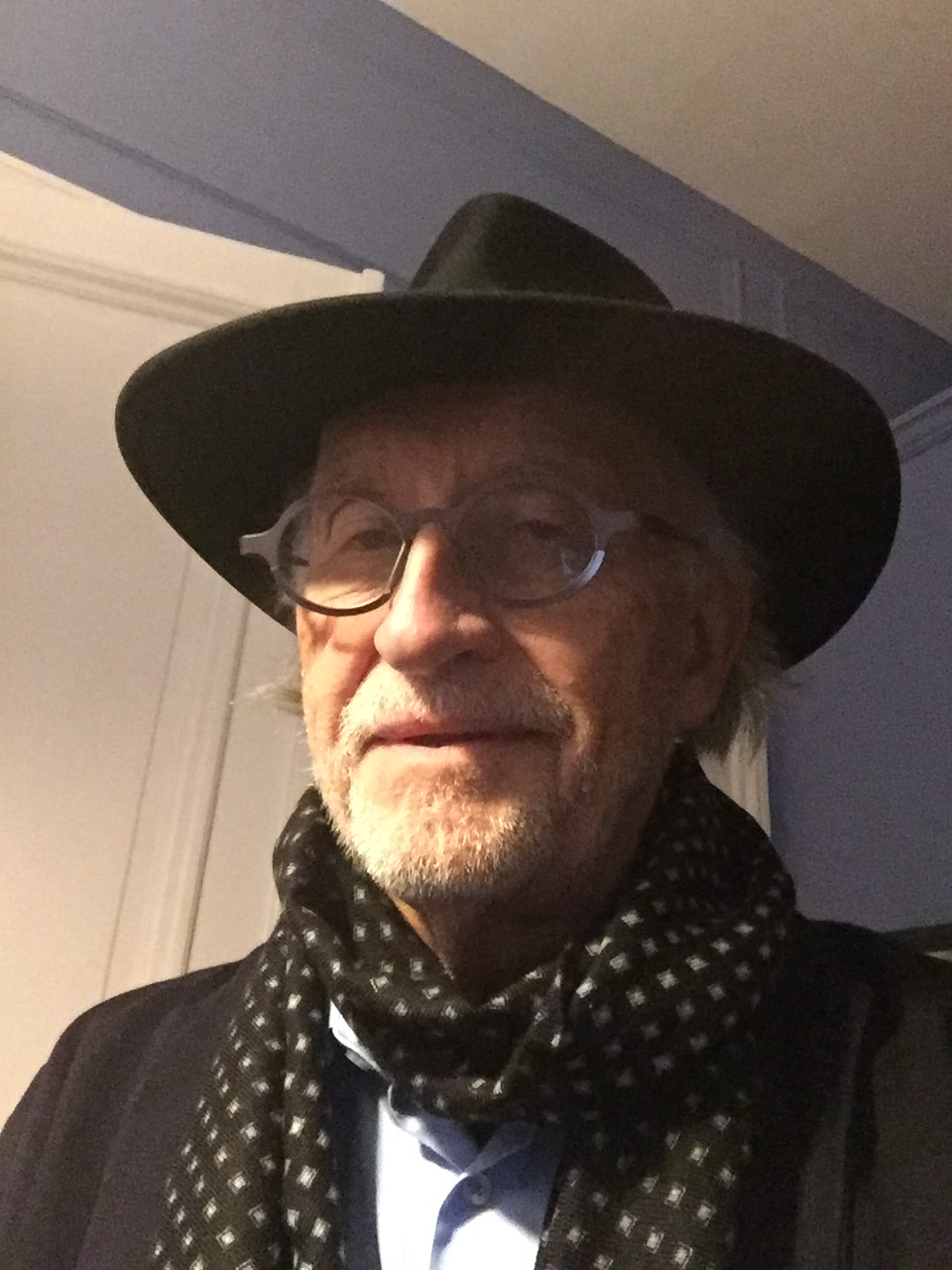
- Jean-Daniel Lafond in 2018

54th Viceregal consort of Canada
- In role September 27, 2005 – October 1, 2010
- Governor General: Michaëlle Jean
- Preceded by: John Ralston Saul
- Succeeded by: Sharon Johnston

Personal details
- Born: August 18, 1944 (age 81) Désertines, Allier, France
- Spouse: Michaëlle Jean
- Children: 3
- Occupation: Filmmaker
- Known for: Viceregal consort to Michaëlle Jean

Jean-Daniel Lafond CC RCA (born August 18, 1944) is a French-Canadian filmmaker, teacher of philosophy, and the husband to the former Governor General Michaëlle Jean, making him the viceregal consort of Canada during her service.

== Biography ==
Lafond was born in France during the liberation of Paris from the Nazis. After attending the class of Michel Foucault and Michel Serres, he taught philosophy from 1971 "while pursuing research in audio-visual training and communications". In 1974 Lafond left France for Quebec and became a Canadian citizen in 1981. After teaching at the Université de Montréal he left the university to focus on film-making, radio and writing.

From his first marriage Lafond has two daughters, as well as two grandchildren. With his current wife, former Governor General Michaëlle Jean, he has an adopted daughter.

== Books ==
- Images d'un doux ethnocide, with Arthur Lamothe, Montréal, Ateliers audio-visuels du Québec, 1979.
- Vidéo-communication, with Claire Meunier, Montréal, Publications Grerdave, 1979.
- Pratique et analyse des médias en milieu éducatif, Montréal, Publications Grerdave, 1980.
- Le film sous influence : un procédé d'analyse, Paris, Édilig, "Médiathèque", 1982.
- Les traces du rêve, Montréal, L'Hexagone, 1991.
- La manière nègre ou Aimé Césaire, chemin faisant : genèse d'un film, Montréal, L'Hexagone, 1993.
- La liberté en colère : le livre du film, Montréal, L'Hexagone, 1994.
- Iran : les mots du silence, with Fred A. Reed, Laval, Les 400 Coups, 2006.
- Conversations in Tehran, with Fred A. Reed, Vancouver, Talon Books, 2006.
- Marie de l'Incarnation ou la déraison d'amour, with Marie Tifo, Montréal, Leméac, 2009.
- Un désir d'Amérique. Fragments nomades, Montréal, Édito, 2015.

== Introduction ==
- "Préface : la rencontre", in Olivier Ducharme et Pierre-Alexandre Fradet, Une vie sans bon sens. Regard philosophique sur Pierre Perrault, Montréal, Nota bene, 2016.

== Filmography ==
- La Liberté en colère
- Tropique Nord
- Haïti dans tous nos rêves
- Dream Tracks (Les Traces du rêve)
- la Manière nègre ou Aimé Césaire chemin faisant
- L'Heure de Cuba
- Salam Iran
- Le Cabinet du docteur Ferron
- Le Fugitif ou les vérités d'Hassan
- Folle de Dieu
- Un film avec toi

=== Distinctions ===
- Chevalier of l'Ordre des Arts et des Lettres, France (2014)
- Prize TV5 pour le meilleur documentaire de langue française
- Prize Lumières de l'Association québécoise des réalisateurs pour l'ensemble de son oeuvre
- Prize Gemini du meilleur réalisateur
- Prize Gemini pour l'image
- Prize Hot Docs pour le meilleur film politique, Toronto
- Member Royal Society of Canada
- "Saskatchewan Centennial Medal"
- Companion of the Order of Canada

== Controversy ==
When in 2005 his wife was nominated by Prime Minister Paul Martin as the next Governor General, controversy arose when his past resurfaced. While the personality of Michaëlle Jean was mostly accepted throughout Canada, Lafond himself had early on been suspected of being a Quebec separatist because of some of his movies. When an article in a sovereigntist journal made its way to the press, alleging that Lafond had befriended a former FLQ (militant Quebec-separatist organization) member who had built for him a cache "to hide weapons" in his library. Later in August, his wife reacted to this in a formal letter announcing she and her husband "had never adhered to a political party or to the sovereigntist ideology".

Confusion continues to surround his loyalties. In his book, La manière nègre (The Black Way), he wrote, "So, a sovereign Quebec? An independent Quebec? Yes, and I applaud with both hands and I promise to be at all the St. Jean [Baptiste] parades." However, in October 2005, in an interview with Radio-Canada he said, "I never believed that I could become a separatist. I have a great deal of difficulty with nationalism in general." He also called members of the sovereigntist movement who had called him a traitor, terrorists. At the same time he affirmed that he was a Québécois before a Canadian. He believes that he has always fought for the "cultural independence" of Quebec, but nothing further.

Lafond's 2006 film American Fugitive: The Truth About Hassan, a documentary about American political activist, David Belfield, who has admitted to assassinating an Iranian diplomat in 1980 also stirred controversy. The National Post asserted that the film was too sympathetic to the activist.

== Honours ==
In 2010, he was made a member of the Royal Canadian Academy of Arts.

As the consort of the then Governor General, in 2005 he was appointed a Companion of the Order of Canada and was awarded the Saskatchewan Centennial Medal. During his wife's term of office, he held the courtesy style of His Excellency.

Ribbon bars of Jean-Daniel Lafond

== Arms ==
Coat of arms of Jean-Daniel Lafond

Adopted
March 20, 2008
Crest
Issuant from a zoetrope Azure, a full moon Or its dexter eye embedded with a camera lens Azure
Escutcheon
Azure a banyan tree eradicated Or
Supporters
Two horse-doves Azure and Or, each supporting a walking stick Or
Compartment
A grassy mount Or
Motto
L’HUMANITÉ POUR PATRIE French: HUMANITY FOR ONE'S HOMELAND
Orders
The ribbon and insignia of a Companion of the Order of Canada.
DESIDERANTES MELIOREM PATRIAM (They desire a better country)
Symbolism
The background of the shield is blue with a gold banyan tree in the centre. The banyan is a lush tree with aerial roots that are sent down into the earth to form secondary trunks. The banyan begins as an epiphyte on a host tree, where its seeds are dropped by a fruit-eating bird. It sends out its aerial roots from its branches, which develop into full trunks once they reach the earth, allowing the tree to spread over a vast area. It belongs to the Ficus genus of the family Moraceae. It is related to the fig tree and can develop into giant trees covering several hectares. Originally from India, Pakistan and Sri Lanka, it has also been imported into other regions of the world. The first banyan tree in the United States was planted by Thomas Alva Edison in Fort Myers, Florida. The largest banyan tree is reported to be in Pune, India, with a circumference measuring 800 metres. For Mr. Lafond, the banyan symbolizes the very essence of man, who must adapt to, develop within and put down roots in his environment. It is also the symbol of work and culture, perseverance, energy and hope.The figure atop the crest consists of a magic lantern and a moon. Magic lanterns are ancient toys that, over time, inspired the thought and technical progress that led to the invention of film in the late 19th century. For Mr. Lafond, the magic lantern represents all forms of cinematography. It also symbolizes light as a source of inspiration and premise for knowledge and as the ultimate weapon against obscurity and ignorance. This light is the source of knowledge and impetus to the philosophical approach used by Plato in his allegory of the cave (The Republic, Book VII). The magic lantern evokes the work of the filmmaker who transposes his perception of reality into his films. It suggests that everyone perceives the world differently depending on his or her culture, history and interests. The moon charged with a camera lens evokes a well-known image from the film Voyage dans la lune (1902), a veritable masterpiece of photographic illusions and technical innovations by French filmmaker George Méliès (1861-1938). "Visionary director, special effects genius, Méliès defies the imagination by using multiple technical effects, ranging from optical illusions to double exposures, effects editing and colour effects, camera stops and prestidigitation. He’s done it all. But George Méliès did not just invent film entertainment and cinematic tricks; he was also a man of the theatre, an artist, painter, cartoonist, magician, writer, actor, technician, director, and creator of the first film studio."The horse-doves consist of a hybrid between a horse and a dove. For Mr. Lafond, they represent his French origins (the horse is an animal from his childhood) and his personal aspirations (the dove symbolizes peace). They are each holding a stick. For Mr. Lafond, these two sticks represent the supporters of thought and the tools of knowledge that a philosopher needs in his quest for truth and knowledge. They refer to Socrates walking in the dark, a stick in his left hand to ensure safe footing and a lantern in his right hand to light the way. L’HUMANITÉ POUR PATRIE, meaning "humanity for one’s homeland."

Honorary titles
Preceded by John Ralston Saul	Viceregal Consort of Canada; 2005–2010	Succeeded by Sharon Johnston
