= Harakat Hezbollah al-Nujaba =

Iraqi Shi'ite paramilitary group

12th Brigade Harakat Hezbollah al-Nujaba
- Arabic: حركة حزب الله النجباء
- Leader: Akram al-Kaabi
- Spokesperson: Nasr al-Shammari
- Dates active: 2013–present
- Allegiance: Iran (IRGC); Iraq (2014–present)
- Group: See section
- Active regions: Iraq; Gaza Strip (charity work); Syrian Civil War; Aleppo; East Ghouta, Damascus; Latakia; Al-Ghab Plain, Hama
- Ideology: Shia Islamism; Vilayat-e Faqih; Khomeinism; Anti-West; Anti-Zionism; Anti-Americanism
- Size: 8,000-10,000 (2017)
- Part of: Popular Mobilization Forces; Islamic Resistance in Iraq; 4th Armoured Division (until 2024); Axis of Resistance
- Wars: Iraq War; War in Iraq; Syrian Civil War
- Website: Official website

Harakat Hezbollah al-Nujaba (The Nujaba Movement or HHN; Arabic: حركة حزب الله النجباء, romanized: Ḥaraka Ḥizballāh an-Nujabā’, lit. 'Movement of the Party of God's Nobles'), officially the 12th Brigade, is a Shi'ite Iraqi paramilitary group that is especially active in Iraq and formerly in Ba'athist Syria. It was established in 2013 by Akram al-Kaabi to support the regime of Bashar al-Assad in Syria against Sunni Islamist rebels. The group is supported by the IRGC's Quds Force, which provides the funding, weapons, and training of its members.

The militia is also supported by the Lebanese Hezbollah and acts as part of the Axis of Resistance. It is a part of Iraq's Popular Mobilization Forces (PMF), a group of Shi’ite militias that are close to Iran, until 2020 when it joined the Islamic Resistance in Iraq. The Nujaba Movement adopts the ideology of the Islamic Revolution in Iran and regards Iran's supreme leader Ali Khamenei as its supreme leader. A January 2024 report in The Hill indicates that it is still part of the PMF. The group seeks to establish an Iran-aligned government in Iraq, expel U.S. and allied forces from the country, and advance Iranian interests throughout the Middle East.

HHN militia fighters in Iraq are deployed mainly in southern Iraq and in the provinces of Baghdad, Salah ad Din, Diyala, and Nineveh. The militia fighters in Syria are deployed mainly in the provinces of Deir ez-Zor and Raqqa, where they have established positions, headquarters, training camps, and recruitment offices to recruit Syrian residents.

HHN has a TV channel named Alnujaba TV, which is based in Baghdad, Iraq.

In March 2019, the U.S. secretary of state Mike Pompeo designated Harakat Hezbollah al-Nujaba (and all its aliases and component parts) and its leader Akram al-Kaabi Specially Designated Global Terrorists (SDGT). The sanctions prohibit business with the militia and its leader and freeze all property in their possession. On 18 September 2025, the U.S. Department of State designated Harakat al-Nujaba and its aliases as a Foreign Terrorist Organization under section 219 of the Immigration and Nationality Act.

== Flags ==
Flags of Harakat al-Nujaba
The Flag of Iraq, which is used by the group

== History ==
HHN emerged in 2013 as an offshoot of the Iraqi paramilitary Asaib Ahl al-Haq (AAH) and is led by AAH co-founder Akram al-Kaabi. al-Kaabi said that he formed the militia after a period of inactivity in the Syrian Civil War. He denies it emerged from a "split" with AAH, but that he chose not to unify with them due to disagreements.

Jaber Rajabi has been described by The Jerusalem Post and Al Arabiya as a founding member of Harakat Hezbollah al-Nujaba and Asa'ib Ahl al-Haq.

The two groups still share close affinity, often simultaneously commemorating martyrs. They have even released a nasheed, praising Iranian Quds Force commander, Qasem Soleimani. Both groups follow the Iranian government's ideology, and al-Kaabi has stated that he would overthrow the Iraqi government or fight alongside the Yemeni Houthis in the Yemeni civil war if ordered by Grand Ayatollah Khamenei.

HHN was one of the first Iraqi paramilitaries to have sent fighters to Syria, where it had been active since its formation in 2013. It had an increasing role in Syria after a significant boost to recruitment efforts took place in 2015. It was a major participant in the 2015 South Aleppo offensive and the breaking of the siege of the Shia towns Nubl and Zahraa in the Idlib governorate.

In December 2014, ABNA.ir published photos of Iranian-built Yasir UAV (an unlicensed copy of the American ScanEagle) claimed in use with HHN.

In April 2015, al-Kaabi said HHN had suffered 126 casualties, including 38 in Syria.

On 1 January 2019, al-Kaabi said that the IRGC and Lebanese Hezbollah helped the Shi'ite militia forces of Muqtada al-Sadr's Mahdi Army that were fighting the U.S. forces in 2004. He said that in the 2004 Battle of Najaf, IRGC and Hezbollah officers were present on the ground and helped during the battle, in which 13 US servicemen were killed and over 100 wounded.

In November 2023, the Islamic Resistance in Iraq launched missiles on various Israel targets, including in the Red Sea city of Eilat.

On 3 December 2023, five members of Harakat Hezbollah al-Nujaba were killed in U.S. airstrikes near Kirkuk as they were preparing to launch a drone against American forces.

On 4 January 2024, a targeted drone strike by the U.S. military in Baghdad killed the region's deputy commander of operations, Mushtaq Talib Al-Saeedi, or Abu Taqwa. Other casualties sustained included 3 additional individuals and 6 wounded.

== Divisions ==
HHN comprises four brigades:

- Liwa Ammar Ibn Yasir (Ammar Ibn Yasir Brigade; designated as terrorist by UAE)
- Liwa al-Hamd (Praise Brigade)
- Liwa al-Imam al-Hassan al-Mujtaba (Brigade of Imam Hassan the Chosen)
- Golan Liberation Brigade

The group also had a separate Syria branch which fought as part of the Syrian army's 4th Division called:

- Harakat Hezbollah al-Nujaba Syrian-wing

== See also ==
- Iran–Israel proxy conflict
- List of armed groups in the Syrian Civil War
- Holy Shrine Defender
- U.S. Department of State list of Foreign Terrorist Organizations
- Hamid Fazeli
- Unit 340
