= Ali Akbar Tabatabaei =

Iranian diplomat (1930–1980)

- Born: 4 September 1930; Hamedan, Imperial State of Iran
- Died: 22 July 1980 (aged 49); Bethesda, Maryland, United States
- Resting place: Falls Church, Virginia, United States
- Education: Tehran University, Howard University

Ali Akbar Tabatabaei (Persian: علی‌اکبر طباطبایی English pronunciation; 4 September 1930 – 22 July 1980) was an Iranian exile and former press attaché to the Iranian embassy in the United States during the reign of Mohammad Reza Shah Pahlavi.

== Biography ==
Ali Akbar Tabatabaei was born on 4 September 1930, in Hamedan, Imperial State of Iran, to a prominent Iranian family, he was the grandson of a mullah. He had a twin brother, Mohammad.

Tabatabaei attended Tehran University and had a degree in law. In 1952, he came to the United States, with dreams of becoming an architect and to study at Howard University's School of Architecture. While attending Howard University, he took a part-time job at the Iranian Embassy. There were rumors that he was connected to SAVAK, Iran's secret police during the Pahlavi era.

It took Tabatabaei many years to complete his bachelor’s degree in architecture. In 1969 or 1970, he returned to Tehran to work at the Iranian ministry of information to help foreigners learn more about Iranian life.

In 1972 he left Iran due to harassment by the SAVAK. He briefly lived in Italy before moving to Ohio to work at an architecture firm.

In 1975, Ardeshir Zahedi was named ambassador to Washington, and Tabatabaei joined him to resume working at the Iranian embassy. After the Iranian Revolution in 1979, he continued his exile in the United States and actively criticized the Grand Ayatollah Ruhollah Khomeini. He became president of the Iran Freedom Foundation in Bethesda, Maryland, a counter-revolutionary group.

== Death ==
On 22 July 1980, Tabatabaei was fatally shot on the front door of his Bethesda, Maryland, home by Dawud Salahuddin. Salahuddin is an American Muslim convert who attended Howard University and was associated with an Iranian militant group. Salahuddin disguised himself as a postman with a borrowed mail truck.

Tabatabaei's murder is allegedly considered the last successful Iranian assassination plot on American soil. Salahuddin stated he was paid $5,000 by the Iranians to kill Tabatabaei. He is currently on the FBI fugitives list. He escaped to Iran via Paris and Geneva, reaching Tehran on 31 July 1980. In a 1996 interview with ABC's 20/20, Salahuddin again confessed to killing Tabatabaei. He further stated that he thought the killing was "an act of war". In 2009, it was discovered that Salahuddin had been using a new name, Hassan Abdulrahman, and that he had been running the website of Press TV, a state-owned English-language Iranian news network.
