= Dawud Salahuddin =

American-born fugitive living in Iran

- Born: David Theodore Belfield; November 10, 1950 (age 75); Roanoke Rapids, North Carolina, U.S.
- Other names: Daoud Salahuddin, Hassan Abdul Rahman, Hassan Abdulrahman, Hassan Tantai
- Known for: Assassinating Ali Akbar Tabatabaei

Dawud Salahuddin (born 1950; sometimes spelled Daoud Salahuddin, also known as Hassan Abdulrahman, Hassan Tantai) is an American-born Iranian fugitive, and worked for the military, as well as in education, as a web designer, film and television. He converted to Islam in 1980 and killed Ali Akbar Tabatabai the same year at Tabatabai's home in Bethesda, Maryland; Tabatabai was an Iranian dissident and critic of Ruhollah Khomeini. Salahuddin is a fugitive from justice living in the Islamic Republic of Iran.

Salahuddin is the last person known to have seen Robert Levinson, a CIA agent who disappeared in Kish Island, Iran, in March 2007.

== Early life ==
Dawud Salahuddin was born David Theodore Belfield in Roanoke Rapids, North Carolina, on November 10, 1950. He grew up in Bay Shore, New York, on Long Island, in a church-going Baptist family of four boys and one girl.

According to Salahuddin, as an African-American child, the "most damage done" to him was the feeling he had that it was "an indecency, an insufficiency, certainly a shame not to be white". In 1963 he describes himself as having become politicized while watching news footage from Birmingham, Alabama, showing commissioner of public safety Bull Connor turn back civil-rights marchers with fire hoses and dogs, which caused him to develop "an implacable hatred toward all symbols of American authority". After graduating from high school, he attended Howard University in Washington, D.C., for one semester, but dropped out having lost interest in his classes.

He joined a military-type group but eventually left because it opposed his interest in Marxism. He met a musician and a Korean War deserter who convinced him that "Islam was the way for black men to find their destiny." He met most militant Islamic leaders in the U.S. and became more radicalized. He found himself at odds with the Chicago version of Islam taught by Elijah Muhammad. He changed his name to Dawud Salahuddin at this time and began to visit Ernest Timothy McGhee, who had changed his name to Hamaas Abdul Khaalis. Salahuddin frequented Khaalis' mosque. In 1973, when Khaalis' family was murdered Salahuddin had "a moment of clarity" and realized "that the Black Islamic leadership in America was being run by, like, the Mafia".

He was attracted to Islam because he thought it was "color-blind," and he converted at the age of 18. He frequented an Iranian student center run by Bahram Nahidian. During the early 1970s, he visited prisons around Washington, D.C., to "bring the message of Islam to black inmates." He met Said Ramadan, an Egyptian lawyer and Islamic scholar, in 1975, and Ramadan later became his mentor. An article in the New Yorker quotes him stating that as an "angry and alienated" African-American, "my biggest aspiration was to bring America to its knees, but I didn't know how".

== Murder of Tabatabai ==
Salahuddin first worked for the Islamic Republic of Iran in 1980, shortly after the Islamic Revolution as a security guard at an Iranian interest office in the Algerian Embassy in Washington D.C. He accepted an assignment from the Islamic government to assassinate Ali Akbar Tabatabai, a former member of the Shah's regime living in exile in Bethesda, Maryland.

According to a 2002 article in The New Yorker magazine, Salahuddin first attempted to convince his Iranian employers to let him kill a more prominent American target, such as Henry Kissinger or Kermit Roosevelt Jr.—the grandson of President Theodore Roosevelt who orchestrated the 1953 plot to depose Iran's elected prime minister Mohammad Mosaddeq.

On July 22, 1980, Salahuddin showed up at Tabatabai's front door in Bethesda, Maryland, dressed as a mailman and driving a borrowed postal truck, telling Tabatabai's associate he had a special delivery package that required his signature. When Tabatabai appeared, Salahuddin shot him three times in the abdomen and fled. Tabatabai died 45 minutes later at a hospital. Salahuddin made his way to Iran by way of Montreal, Canada, and Geneva, Switzerland.

Salahuddin denies receiving any direct payments from the Iranian government besides the $5,000 he received for killing Tabatabai. In 1995, Salahuddin admitted to killing Tabatabai in an interview on ABC's 20/20 in Istanbul. In conversations with a reporter from The New Yorker magazine he denied the killing was "murderous", stating it was "an act of war...In Islamic religious terms, taking a life is sometimes sanctioned and even highly praised, and I thought that event was just such a time." This was allegedly the last known Iranian assassination plot on United States soil.

Three other people were indicted in the United States in the Tabatabai murder for aiding and abetting, including Horace Anthony Butler (also known as Ahmed Rauf), William Caffee, and Lee Curtis Manning (also known as Ali Abdul-Mani).

== Iran ==
Salahuddin arrived in Iran on July 31, 1980, and has lived there most of the time, with short periods in other Muslim countries and North Korea, being careful not to expose himself to extradition back to the United States for homicide.

In his over 30 years as a fugitive, he has worked as an English teacher, a war correspondent, and a web editor. He fought the Soviets alongside the Afghan Mujahideen, and acted "in a film (Kandahar) by one of Iran's leading directors" in 2000. He married an Iranian woman, speaks Persian, and works as a freelance writer.

According to the BBC, Salahuddin is known "by several other names", and U.S. magazine Time reported "he is also known as Hassan Abdul Rahman, a former editor of the state-sponsored English-language newspaper Iran Daily". According to Salahuddin he was a soldier with the Mujahideen in Afghanistan from December 1986 to May 1988.

Salahuddin worked as chief online editor for Press TV, an English-language international television channel funded by the Iranian government, for three years before resigning in July 2009 following the disputed presidential elections. He is "close" to prominent Iranian reformists film director Mohsen Makhmalbaf and Masoumeh Ebtekar, the former spokeswoman for the hostage-takers at the United States Embassy in Tehran.

Salahuddin has had some indirect contact with American authorities. Shortly after the first bombing of the World Trade Center in 1993, U.S. intelligence agents established contact with Salahuddin, who "began a back-channel relationship with American authorities and talked about returning to the United States to stand trial in the murder of Tabatabai". He sent a letter to U.S. Attorney General Janet Reno dated March 5, 1994, proposing mediating between the United States and "certain key figures in the worldwide Islamic movement" in return for freedom from prosecution. No reply was given to his letter.

Salahuddin reportedly met with Robert Levinson on Iran's Kish Island in 2007, shortly before Levinson disappeared while Levinson was working on a botched CIA operation. On March 25, 2020, Levinson's family reported that US officials had informed them that Levinson died in Iranian custody. Salahuddin is currently on the FBI fugitives list.

== Film appearances ==
=== Kandahar ===
Salahuddin is also an actor and he played a starring role as a sympathetic character who aided the heroine of the 2001 film Kandahar by director Mohsen Makhmalbaf. The heroine of the film is a Canadian woman, born in Afghanistan, who slips back into Afghanistan before the fall of the Taliban to try to rescue her sister. During her travels, she is befriended by an English-speaking medic (Salahuddin), an exiled American political activist. The heroine of the film did travel to Afghanistan, in an attempt to rescue her friend, and Salahuddin is an American in exile for a "political activity".

In response to criticism of his casting of Salahuddin, Makhmalbaf wrote in The Guardian that he (Makhmalbaf), had been tortured by the SAVAK, of which the murder victim Tabatabai was "a prominent member", and that Tabatabai's brother "does not understand that Belfield [Salahuddin] is also a victim—a victim of the ideal he believed in. His humanity when he opened fire against his ideological enemy, was martyred by his idealism". After the film was released, Doug Gansler, then State's Attorney for Montgomery County, later Attorney General of Maryland, said that Salahuddin was still a wanted man.

=== American Fugitive: The Truth About Hassan ===
In 2006, Jean-Daniel Lafond released a film entitled American Fugitive: The Truth About Hassan, about Salahuddin. Lafond's film stirred controversy. Some reviewers called it "convincing, gripping, moving", while others thought it gave "credence to conspiracy theories debunked years ago" and sympathy for "a cold-blooded murderer".

== See also ==
- Islamist terrorism
- 2011 alleged Iran assassination plot – an unsuccessful assassination plot involving an Iranian-American citizen with alleged ties to Iranian government officials and the Quds Force.
