= Nelofer Pazira =

Canadian actor, director and journalist

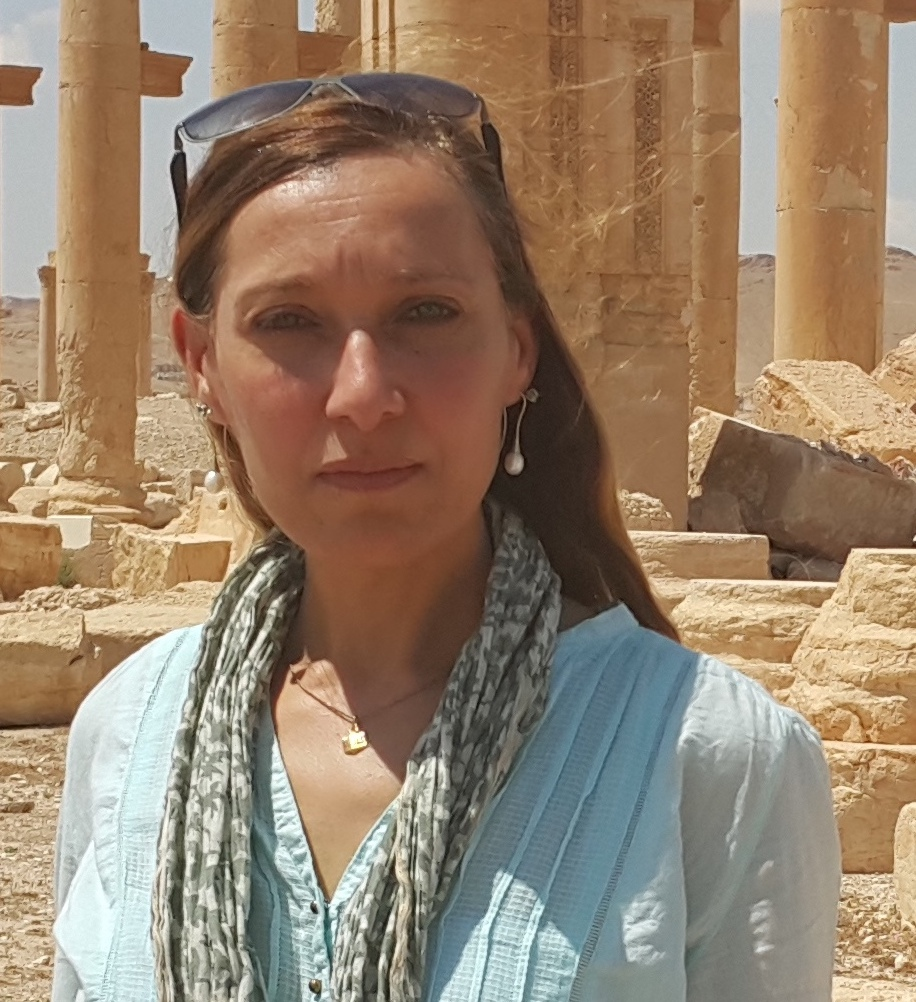
Nelofer Pazira Fisk - Palmyra, Syria

Nilofar Pazira (Dari: نیلوفر پذیرا) is an Afghan-Canadian director, actress, journalist and author.

== Biography ==
Nelofer Pazira was born in 1973 in Hyderabad, India, where her Afghan father was then working with the World Health Organization. She grew up in Kabul, Afghanistan. She lived through ten years of Soviet occupation, before an extremely perilous escape to Pakistan with her family in 1989 at the age of 16. The following year the family immigrated to New Brunswick, Canada.

In 2001 Nelofer established her own film company, Kandahar Films, and has directed a number of documentaries. She has been a jury member at a number of film festivals (including those of Locarno, Geneva, São Paulo, Edinburgh, and Montreal), and has worked for the Canadian Broadcasting Corporation (CBC) in CBC Television and CBC Radio.

Nelofer holds a degree in Journalism and English Literature from Carleton University in Ottawa and a master's degree in Anthropology/Sociology and Religion from Concordia University in Montreal. She has also received an honorary doctorate of law from Carleton. Recently, she received an honorary doctorate of letters from Thompson Rivers University in Kamloops, British Columbia.

She is a frequent speaker at international conferences, as well as universities and colleges, including Carleton University and George Washington University, and was a keynote speaker at the Religion, Culture & Conflict symposium at Trinity Western University. Pazira defended Joseph Boyden's novel Three Day Road in Canada Reads 2006.

In 2006, Nelofer's memoir, A Bed of Red Flowers: In Search of My Afghanistan, was named winner of the Drainie-Taylor Biography Prize.

In 2009, Pazira married English journalist Robert Fisk, who died in 2020.

== Film and radio ==
In 1996, Nelofer attempted to return to Afghanistan when it was under Taliban rule in order to find her lost childhood friend Dyana. This unsuccessful attempt inspired the film Kandahar, a highly acclaimed feature film which was presented at the Cannes Film Festival in 2001, and received significant attention after the September 11, 2001 attacks. The film starred Nelofer as herself, and was a partly-true, partly-fictionalized story based on her 1996 journey. Nelofer was awarded the Prix d'Interprétation by the Festival du Nouveau Cinéma de Montréal for her performance in Kandahar.

Nelofer later co-produced, co-directed, and performed in Return to Kandahar, a documentary that detailed her return to Afghanistan in 2002 in another attempt to find her childhood friend. The documentary won the 2003 Gemini Award in Canada. She also appeared in Christian Frei's documentary, The Giant Buddhas.

In 2008, she directed and produced Audition, a documentary about images and cinema in Afghanistan, which premiered at the Hot Docs Canadian International Documentary Festival. She is the writer and director of Act of Dishonour (2010), a dramatic feature film about honour killing and the plight of returning refugees.

Her radio documentary Of Paradise and Failure about the fate of a young suicide bomber and his family, was the winner of the silver medal at New York's media award ceremony. She has written for the Toronto Star, The Independent of London, the British film journal Sight and Sound, and many other publications.

== Humanitarian work ==
Nelofer founded a charity, the Dyana Afghan Women's Fund (found at www.dawf.ca), which is named after her childhood friend who took her own life during Taliban rule. It provides education and skills for women in Afghanistan. She has also assisted UNESCO as a goodwill ambassador in their cultural work inside Afghanistan.

Nelofer is a past president of the influential freedom of expression movement PEN Canada. In 2009, she accompanied the Governor General of Canada Michaëlle Jean as a cultural delegate in state visits to Slovenia, Croatia and, Greece.

== Filmography ==
- Kandahar (2001)
- Return to Kandahar (2003)
- The Giant Buddhas (2005)
- Audition (2008)
- Act of Dishonour (2010)
- This is Not a Movie (2019)

== Bibliography ==
- A Bed of Red Flowers: In Search of My Afghanistan (2005)
