= Team Media War =

Iraqi governmental organization

- فريق الإعلام الحربي
- Abbreviation: TMW
- Formation: 18 June 2014; 12 years ago
- Type: Local government organization
- Headquarters: Baghdad, Iraq
- Members: Over 11,000
- Official languages: English, Arabic
- Key people: Hadi Al-Amiri, President; Mohanad Najim Aleqabi, First Vice-President
- Website: al-hashed.net

The Team Media War (TMW) (Arabic: فريق الاعلام الحربي) is a government organization affiliated with the Popular Mobilization Forces and the Iraqi Council of Ministers was founded after ISIS entered Mosul.

== History ==
After ISIS entered and occupied the city of Mosul in 2014, Ali al-Sistani issued a fatwa against ISIS; the Popular Mobilization Forces (PMF) was established as a result. A few days after PMF was established, a Team Media War was formed by the Iraqi government and affiliated with followers of President Haider al-Abadi, where it was adopted as a means of transmitting the events of the wars fought by the Popular Mobilization Forces. The main purpose of the formation of Team Media War was to spread propaganda by trying to influence people's opinions of PMF as some of the organization's component militias are considered terrorist groups by some states, while others have been accused of sectarian violence.

== See also ==
- Hadi Al-Amiri
- Abu Mahdi al-Muhandis
- Qais Khazali
