= Zahraa =

Zahraa الزهراء
- Village
- Location in Syria
- Coordinates: 35.205557°N 36.408498°E
- Country: Syria
- Governorate: Hama
- District: Masyaf District
- Subdistrict: Jubb Ramlah Subdistrict

Population (2004)
  - Total: 1,019
- Time zone: UTC+3 (AST)
- City Qrya Pcode: N/A

Zahraa (Arabic: الزهراء) is a Syrian village located in Jubb Ramlah Subdistrict in Masyaf District, Hama. According to the Syria Central Bureau of Statistics (CBS), Zahraa had a population of 1,019 in the 2004 census.
