= Alanwar TV =

Alanwar TV قناة ألانوار الفضائية
- Country: London, England
- Broadcast area: Worldwide, via satellite and internet

Programming
- Language(s): Arabic
- Picture format: 1080

Ownership
- Owner: ALANWAR TV

History
- Launched: 2004

Links
- Website: alanwar.tv

Availability

Alanwar TV (Arabic: قناة ألانوار الفضائية) is a Kuwaiti satellite television channel in London, England. The channel was launched in 2004.

== See also ==
- Television in Iraq
