= Public Opinion News Agency =

RP News اذاعة الرأي العام
- Baghdad; Iraq

Programming
- Language: Arabic
- Format: News/talk

Ownership
- Owner: Iraqi Media Network

Links
- Website: Official website

Public Opinion News Agency(often called RP News ) (Arabic: اذاعة الرأي العام; ) is an Iraqi public radio station but mainly an Arabic-speaking station, broadcasting in many locations throughout the Middle East on AM and FM from Baghdad. It was founded in 2009.

== History ==
Radio "RP News" started broadcasting in 2009, and was created by Iraqi Media Network.

== Awards ==
- Best radio website (2017) from Al Ghadeer International Festival
