= HodHod TV =

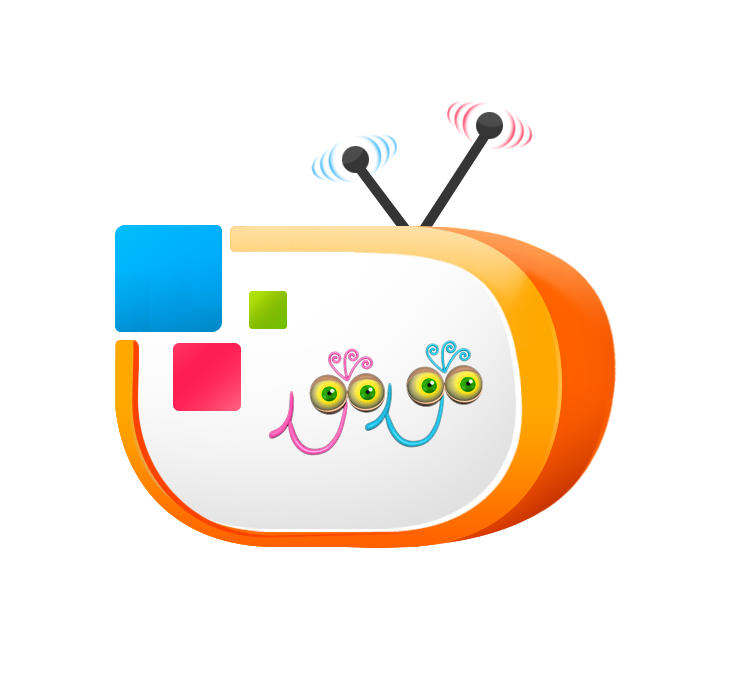
- 2012–2023 Logo of HodHod
- Country: Iran
- Broadcast area: Nationwide
- Headquarters: Tehran

Programming
- Language: Persian
- Picture format: 16:9

Ownership
- Owner: Saba Media Center
- Sister channels: karamish aliraqiya beINSports

History
- Launched: 2011

Links
- Website: hodhodfarsi.ir

HodHod TV logo used in 2022

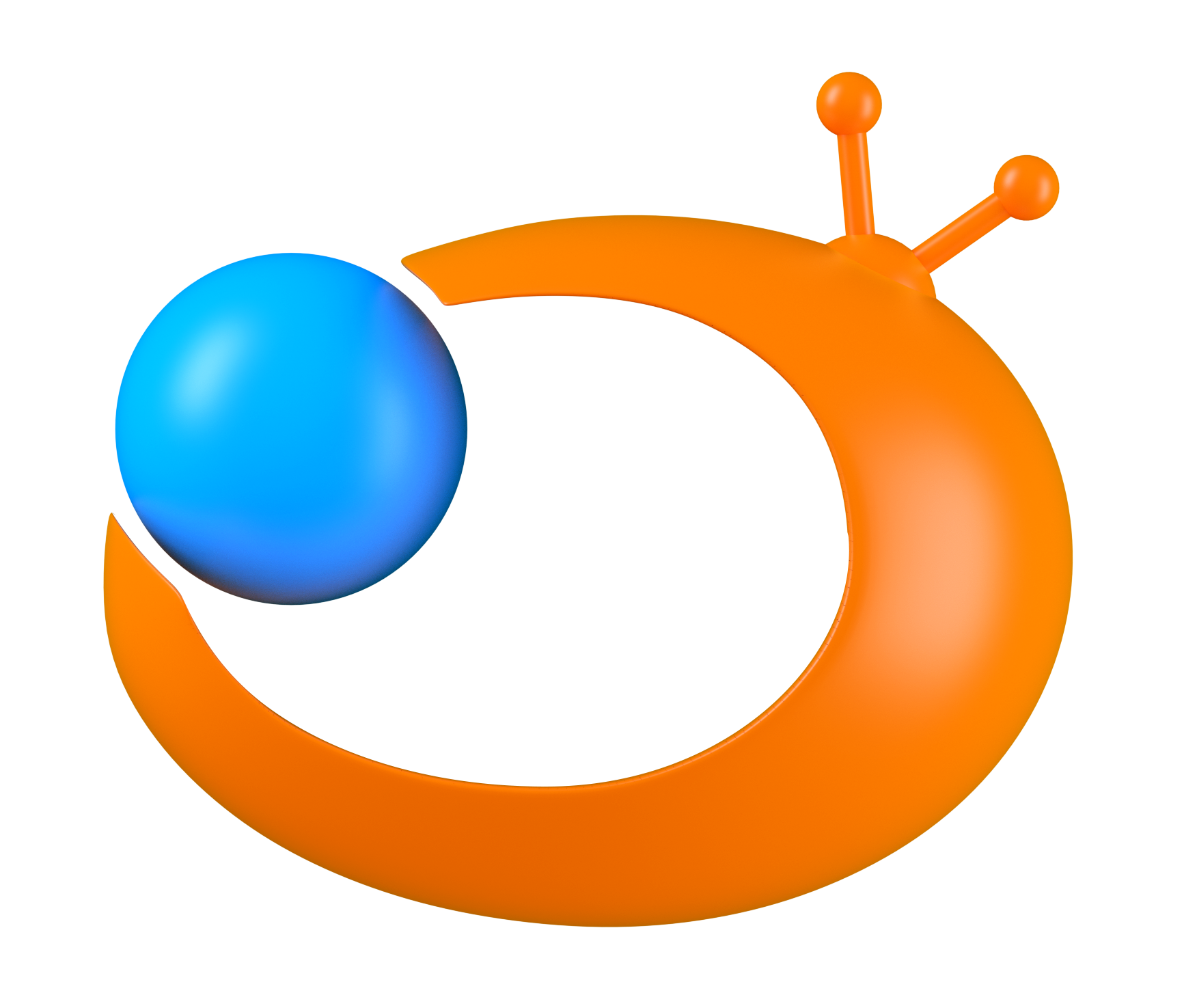
2011 logo of HodHod TV

HodHod TV is a Persian satellite television channel aimed at kids that launched in 2011.
