= Al-Nujaba TV =

Al-Nujaba TV قناة النجباء الفضائية
- Country: Iraq
- Broadcast area: Worldwide, via satellite and internet

Programming
- Languages: English, Arabic

Ownership
- Owner: Harakat Hezbollah al-Nujaba

History
- Launched: 2013

Links
- Website: www.alnujaba.ir

Availability

Streaming media
- Live stream: www.youtube.com/@Nawat_News

Al-Nujaba TV (Arabic: قناة النجباء الفضائية) is an Iraqi satellite television channel based in Baghdad, Iraq, which was launched in 2013.

The channel is owned and controlled by Harakat Hezbollah al-Nujaba, an Iraqi Shi'ite paramilitary group, which in February 2019 was designated by the United States a Specially Designated Global Terrorist (SDGT), as was its leader Akram al-Kaabi and Al-Nujaba TV. On 18 September 2025, the U.S. Department of State designated Harakat al-Nujaba and its aliases, including Al-Nujaba TV, as a Foreign Terrorist Organization under section 219 of the Immigration and Nationality Act.

== History and ownership ==
According to the Washington Institute for Near East Policy, Al-Nujaba TV was launched in 2013 as a media wing of Harakat Hezbollah al-Nujaba, shortly after the group was formed by Akram al-Kaabi. The profile states that the channel broadcasts from Baghdad, has correspondents in most Iraqi provinces, and maintains an office and studio in Tehran.

The same profile describes Al-Nujaba TV as controlled by Harakat Hezbollah al-Nujaba and as part of the group's media directorate. It also states that the channel is affiliated with the Islamic Radio and Television Union and the Iraqi Radio and Television Union. In 2020, the United States seized Al-Nujaba TV's website domain, after which the station linked its website to a new .tv domain.

== See also ==
- Television in Iraq
