= Niatak refugee camp =

Afghan refugee camp

Niatak is an Afghan refugee camp in Iran's southeastern Sistan and Baluchestan Province, near the Iranian city of Zahedan and close to the Afghan border. In 2001 the camp was described as holding 5,000 refugees, while a 1998 report cites 7,000.

A journalist notes that Afghan tribal and sectarian conflicts continued within the camp, particularly between the Pashtun and Hazara ethno-religious groups. The camp was also the site of filming by Mohsen Makhmalbaf for much of his 2001 film Kandahar, set in Afghanistan.
