= Negaah TV =

Hazara television station

Negaah Television Network تلویزیون نگاه
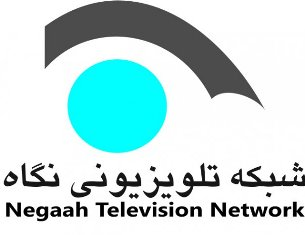
- Country: Afghanistan
- Broadcast area: Afghanistan
- Headquarters: Kabul, Afghanistan

Programming
- Language(s): Dari

Links
- Website: www.negaah.tv

Negaah TV (Dari: تلویزیون نگاه) is a Dari-language television channel in Afghanistan. It is based in the Omid-e Sabz township of Kabul.

== See also ==
- Dari and Pashto subtitles drama
- Television in Afghanistan
