= Alahad TV =

Iraqi TV channel

Alahad Satellite Channel قناة العهد الفضائية
- Country: Iraq

Ownership
- Owner: Asa'ib Ahl al-Haq
- Key people: Sanad Al-Hamdani

History
- Launched: 2010

Links
- Website: www.alahad.iq

Alahad TV (Arabic: قناة العهد Alahad) is a satellite and terrestrial public broadcaster and television network in Iraq that was set up after 2009. Its headquarter is located in Baghdad's Karrada district.

== See also ==
- Television in Iraq
