= Rah-e-Farda =

Media outlet in Kabul, Afghanistan

Rah-e-Farda راه فردا
- Country: Afghanistan
- Broadcast area: Kabul, Afghanistan
- Headquarters: Kabul, Afghanistan

Programming
- Language: Dari-Persian

History
- Launched: 2007

Links
- Website: www.farda.af

Rah-e-Farda (Radio & Television) (Dari: راه فردا) is a radio and television network channel in Kabul, Afghanistan. This TV founded by Muhammad Mohaqiq and head of the TV is Mohaqiq and TV producer is Laal Mohammad Alizada.

== History ==
Rah-e-Farda was established in 2007 by People's Islamic Unity Party of Afghanistan, which is led by Muhammad Mohaqiq. Following Taliban takeover of Kabul in 2021, the outlet complied with Taliban media policies in order to continue operations in Kabul. In 2025, Taliban suspended the outlet’s activities, citing complaints over unpaid staff salaries. The station was later allowed to resumed operations.

=== Suspension ===
On 1 March, Taliban suspended the broadcasts of Rah-e-Farda radio and television in Kabul, a channel affiliated with Mohammad Mohaqiq. The suspension was linked to recent remarks by Mohammad Mohaqiq which reportedly criticized Taliban’s recent retaliatory attacks against Pakistan.

== See also ==
- Television in Afghanistan
- Shamshad TV suspension
