= Al-Kawthar TV =

Iranian Arabic-language TV channel

- Broadcast area: Middle East, North Africa, online, Iran
- Network: Islamic Republic of Iran Broadcasting
- Headquarters: Tehran, Iran Qom, Iran

Programming
- Language: Arabic
- Picture format: 16:9 (576i, SDTV) 16:9 (1080p, HDTV)

History
- Launched: January 2006; 20 years ago

Links
- Website: alkawthartv.ir

Al-Kawthar TV is a Tehran-based Arabic-language television channel. Launched in 2006 by Islamic Republic of Iran Broadcasting, it broadcasts religious and cultural programs about 20 hours a day mainly for Arab audience in the Middle East and North Africa. The content of the programs is mainly about promoting Shia Islam. The TV station derives its name from the heavenly river, Al-Kawthar. Al-Kawthar TV (alkawthartv[.]com) domain was seized by the United States Department of Justice.

== See also ==
- Al-Alam News Network
