= Press TV =

Iranian state-owned English-language news network

- Type: State-run media
- Country: Iran
- Broadcast area: Worldwide
- Headquarters: Tehran, Iran

Programming
- Languages: English, French, Turkish, Hebrew
- Picture format: 16:9 (576i, SDTV) 16:9 (1080p, HDTV)

Ownership
- Owner: Islamic Republic of Iran Broadcasting
- Sister channels: Al-Alam News Network; HispanTV

History
- Launched: 8 July 2007; 19 years ago

Links
- Website: presstv.ir presstv.co.uk (English) french.presstv.ir (French)

Availability

Terrestrial
- Jamaran: CH43 UHF Digital (SD)
- Alvand: CH34 UHF Digital (Full HD)
- Zuku TV (Kenya): Channel 563 (Zuku Fiber only)

Press TV (stylised as PRESSTV) is an Iranian state-owned news media organisation, owned by Islamic Republic of Iran Broadcasting (IRIB), that broadcasts in the English and French languages. The 24-hour channel, which has headquarters in Tehran, was launched on 8 July 2007 and was intended to compete with western English language services. It has been criticized as an outlet for Iranian government propaganda.

== Background and purpose ==
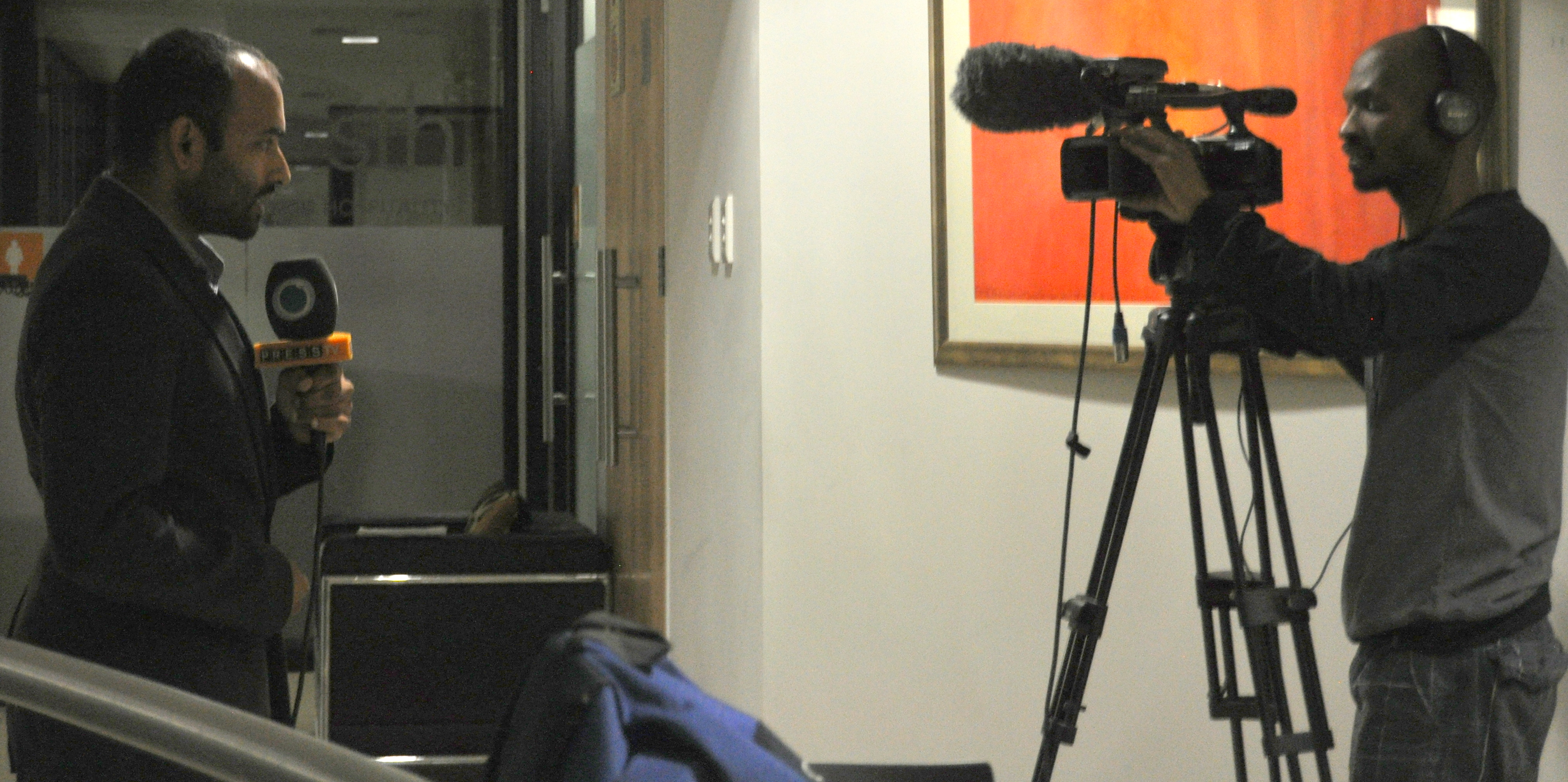
PressTV shooting at University of Johannesburg, South Africa

Iran's first international English-language TV channel was established in 1976. Later in 1997, Sahar TV was launched by IRIB, broadcasting in multiple languages including English.

Press TV was created on 8 July 2007, for the purpose of presenting news, images and arguments, especially on Middle Eastern affairs, to counter the news coverage that appears on BBC World News, CNN International and Al Jazeera English. Press TV is state-funded and is a division of the Islamic Republic of Iran Broadcasting (IRIB), the only organisation legally able to transmit radio and television broadcasts inside Iran. Based in Tehran, it broadcasts to North America, Europe, the Middle East, Asia, and parts of Africa and Latin America.

IRIB's head is appointed directly by the supreme leader, Ayatollah Ali Khamenei; according to The Guardian, it is close to the country's conservative political faction, especially the Revolutionary Guards.

Press TV CEO Mohammad Sarafraz said in a June 2007 press conference that, "Since September 11, Western bias has divided the media into two camps: those that favour their policies make up one group and the rest of the media are attached to radical Islamic groups like Al-Qaeda. We want to show that there is a different view. Iran, and the Shi'as in particular, have become a focal point of world propaganda. From the media point of view, we are trying to give a second eye to Western audiences."

By launching an English-language television network to promote an Iranian perspective of the world, together with an Arab-language station, the Al-Alam News Network, the Iranian government said it hoped "to address a global audience exposed to misinformation and mudslinging as regards the Islamic Republic of Iran." The two networks focus on "difficult issues in the Middle East such as the United States' occupation of neighbouring Iraq and the Shia question." According to mediachannel.org, "the government aims to use Press TV to counter what it sees as a steady stream of Western propaganda against Iran as well as offer an alternative view of world news".

Press TV began its activities in London during 2007. The network's website launched in late January 2007, and the channel itself on 2 July 2007. Roshan Muhammed Salih was Press TV's first London news editor and chief correspondent. In an article for The Guardian in July 2009, Salih wrote that Press TV was "willing to give a platform to legitimate actors whom the western media will not touch, such as Hamas and Hezbollah".

The BBC journalist Linda Pressly described Press TV as pro-Palestinian and opposed to sanctions against Iran in December 2011. At the time Press TV Ltd in London sold programmes to Iran, principally talk shows, while Tehran's Press TV International produced the majority of the news and documentaries.

As of 2009, the annual budget of Press TV is 250 billion rials (more than US$8.3 million). By then, the station was employing more than 400 throughout the world.

== Controversies ==
=== Pro-Iranian government bias ===
Press TV promotes Iranian foreign policy and has been described as Iranian government propaganda.

It has aired the coerced confessions of multiple prisoners, the basis for the revocation of its license to broadcast in the UK after such an incident. Press TV has disputed accusations made against it.

Press TV's news bulletins often feature Iranian ministers, diplomats or government officials, or guest commentators that express views consistent with the Iranian government's "message of the day". In 2012, commentator Douglas Murray wrote that the station was the "Iranian government's propaganda channel".

In a post-election "information offensive", reports the Associated Press, Press TV and Al-Alam have "churned out a blitz of policy statements, negotiating points and news breaks as the main soapboxes for Iran's public diplomacy."

In 2007, the Canadian weekly Maclean's, while observing that "most of Press TV's news reports are factually accurate," alleged that Press TV also publishes "intentional errors", citing a story on the Press TV website that contained the claim, based on "no evidence, that the Lebanese government is trying to convert the Nahr al-Bared Palestinian refugee camp into an American military base."

In August 2009, Ofcom, the British broadcasting regulator, judged that two phone-in shows hosted by George Galloway on Press TV had broken its broadcasting code on impartiality in their coverage of the Gaza War by not including enough calls from pro-Israelis. Press TV said contributions to the show reflected the balance of opinion.

The Sunday Times journalist Eleanor Mills walked out before a Press TV interview in 2010 after discovering she was not being interviewed by Sky News, as she had falsely believed. While she was reassured on editorial independence from Tehran, Mills doubted she would be able to talk about torture in Iran or Neda Agha-Soltan, who was shot dead in the 2009 Iranian presidential election protests.

=== Antisemitism ===
Press TV has been accused by the UK's The Jewish Chronicle of broadcasting "the most disreputable of fringe causes", such as Holocaust denial, and of antisemitic conspiracy theories by the Anti-Defamation League.

It was accused in December 2011 by British journalist Nick Cohen of functioning as "a platform for the full fascist conspiracy theory of supernatural Jewish power". He wrote that "If whites ran Press TV, one would have no difficulty in saying it was a neo-Nazi network". In 2009, Oliver Kamm in The Jewish Chronicle accused Press TV of having an "ability to insinuate into public debate the worst and most pernicious ideas around", including Holocaust denial. Cohen mentioned that the station featured "fascist ideologues such as Peter Rushton, the leader of the White Nationalist Party – an organisation that disproves the notion that the only thing further to the right of the BNP is the wall."

In a September 2009, Press TV picked up and republished an antisemitic conspiracy theory that was circulating in Algeria and Morocco, accusing Jews of a conspiracy to kidnap Algerian children and harvest their organs. Moroccan journalist Hassan Masiky criticized Press TV for trafficking in a dangerous "work of fantasy" that is a "nonsense, nightmarish tale".

In a May 2011 article reprinted on the website of Press TV, correspondent Mark Dankof wrote an article about how the prediction of the fabricated antisemitic text Protocols of the Learned Elders of Zion is "only partially true", and lauded Press TV as "one of the few exceptions to the Lobby's control" of the media.

In 2012, a report from the Anti-Defamation League (ADL) alleged that Press TV had broadcast antisemitic conspiracy theories and opinions, including interviewing individuals such as the American conspiracy theorist David Duke who said on the station that Israel was involved in 9/11 and the Iraq War. He said: "The Zionists orchestrated and created this war in the media, the government, and international finance". The ADL reported in 2013 that in another appearance, Duke made "anti-Semitic allegations that are consistent with his record and typical of the views often espoused on Press TV". Mark Dankof has also backed claims on Press TV that 9/11 was an "Israeli Mossad inside operation from start to finish".

In early 2015, Press TV claimed Jews or Israel were responsible for the Charlie Hebdo shooting in Paris. In a 20 January 2015 article by Kevin Barrett on the station's website he claimed that "The Zionists created ISIL and sent it to fight Muslims and Christians in Syria and Iraq" while "New World Order Zionism is also targeting the USA for destruction". In a 17 February 2015 article for the website, Barrett claimed 9/11 was a "Zionist 'coup d'etat' to seize power in the country and launch a permanent war on Islam on behalf of Israel" and falsely claimed the 2011 attacks in Norway was the responsibility of a "team of Zionist-liked professional killers."

In early March 2020, during the COVID-19 pandemic, Press TV broadcast an item claiming "Zionist elements developed a deadlier strain of coronavirus against Iran" and a few days later claimed Israel was responsible for the virus.

==== Publication of Holocaust denial ====
On the subject of International Holocaust Remembrance Day (27 January), an editorial on the Press TV website in 2008 noted, "On this anniversary, we all need to mull over the faking of history and the Greatest Lie Ever Told". In 2008, The Jerusalem Post and the British Searchlight magazine criticized Press TV for reprinting on its website an article entitled "The Walls of Auschwitz: A Review of the Chemical Studies" by the British Holocaust denier Nicholas Kollerstrom which was first published by the denial group, the Committee for Open Debate on the Holocaust (CODOH). The document claims that the Auschwitz gas chambers were used for "benign" purposes only and said "the alleged massacre of Jewish people by gassing during World War II was scientifically impossible". Press TV described Kollerstrom, by then removed as an honorary fellow of University College London (UCL) because of the article, as a "distinguished academic". Other Holocaust deniers to have appeared on the station include Michèle Renouf and Peter Rushton.

In a 2014 article on the website, the Canadian writer Brandon Martinez described Auschwitz as having been an appealing place where Jews were able to participate in "cultural and leisure activities". He rejected the existence of gas chambers during the Holocaust and the use of Zyklon B for the mass killings of European Jews. To make his assertions, he drew on claims made by Holocaust deniers Mark Webber and David Irving.

In November 2013, the Press TV website reprinted an opinion piece in its 'Viewpoints' section, first written by M.I. Bhat for Veterans Today, although Bhat was a regular columnist for Press TV as well. The article blamed Jews for their fate in the Holocaust and accepted "the Nazi regime's anti-Jewish conspiracy theories as historical fact". Bhat queried whether American Jews were "incubating another Hitler".

=== Maziar Bahari case ===
On 10 June 2010, the United Kingdom's Channel 4 News interviewed Iranian-Canadian journalist Maziar Bahari, a documentary maker and Newsweek contributor, who was arrested while filming the protests following the contested Iranian presidential election in 2009.

Held in Evin Prison, Bahari was accused of spying for the CIA, MI6 and Mossad, and was detained for 118 days. Bahari alleged that a 10-second Press TV interview and 'confession' that the western media was guilty of fomenting the protests had been preceded by torture, and was given under the threat of execution. The nature of the interview, that it was a forced confession, was not disclosed to viewers of the footage. Having to talk complete rubbish before a camera to save his life "was like a rape", he told The Sunday Times in 2012. "It went against the very essence of me". Bahari is not the only Iranian prisoner who has been coerced with a following broadcast of the supposed confession.

=== Allegations about Canada ===
Following the severing of diplomatic relations between Canada and Iran in September 2012, Press TV began to devote more attention to Canada.

In December 2012, Press TV aired a report entitled "Alberta takes aboriginal kids from parents at high rate" in which Joshua Blakeney, Press TV's Calgary correspondent, claimed that Alberta's child protective services were engaged in the human trafficking of First Nations children. Blakeney stated that "Some upset parents allege that there is a profit motive behind what they refer to as Canada's so-called child protective services" and asserted that an anti-terrorism squad, called INSET, was responsible for the abductions.

One of the veiled women interviewed in the report (who was not identified) claimed that her "aboriginal children were taken by a squad of 32 police officers." Another woman interviewed stated that "It definitely is a money-making scheme, because a lot of native children have been sold into adoption, but it is also used as an assimilation program [and] a genocidal program." The report also showed written messages of "Help me! Now!!", which were allegedly written by abducted children.

The allegations in the report were immediately denied by Government officials and Native leaders. Cindy Blackstock, an associate professor at the University of Alberta and executive director of the First Nations Child and Family Caring Society of Canada denied the report was true, stating that "The factors driving aboriginal children into care have been well-known for 15 years; it's poverty, poor housing and substance abuse. ... The federal government provides significantly less funding on reserves than for all other Canadians ... but I have never in my life heard of any military undertones to this."

Blakeney has also claimed in reports published or broadcast by Press TV, that the appearance of Canada's new $20 bill was evidence that Canada "remained an imperialist nation" and that "90% of Canadian youth felt stressed about careers." Blakeney subsequently claimed that his reports for Press TV are "defiantly illuminating the skeletons in Canada's closet."

Another report made several charges against the Canadian government, including:

- Secret plans to "steal indigenous children";
- "Ignorance of the First Nation land rights";
- Jailing refugees without cause; and
- using excessive force to suppress student protests.

Another program interviewed Alfred Lambremont Webre, who was described as an "international lawyer" based in Vancouver. Webre stated Canadian prime minister Stephen Harper is an "out and out Zionist" who is engaging in the "same repressive policies within Canada that Israel follows within its own territories against the Palestinian people." Webre then described a conspiracy between Vancouver police and serial killer Robert Pickton "to commit ritual Satanic murders with high-ranking politicians." Finally, Webre claimed that Queen Elizabeth II abducted 10 Aboriginal children in 1964. Concluding his comments, Webre described Canada as "the ultimate Zionist state under the British Crown and under Israel."

In response, Paul Heinbecker, a former Canadian ambassador to the United Nations and a distinguished fellow at the Centre for International Governance Innovation at the University of Waterloo, has stated that Press TV is highlighting Canada's First Nations in order to "negate" Canadian reports of human rights allegations against Iran. Heinbecker stated that "The human rights situations in the two countries are scarcely comparable ... but our own very real shortcomings on Aboriginal issues ... are fodder for the Iranian efforts." Iranian native Payam Akhavan, a professor of international law at McGill University, stated that "Canada's diplomatic posture has elevated its ranking in the regime's demonology charts." Ed Corrigan, an immigration lawyer and former councillor for London, Ontario, is a regular guest on Press TV. Corrigan, who has said that "There's very few people in Canada who have more expertise on Middle East politics than I do," argues that Press TV is demonstrating the "international opinion" of Canada's treatment of its native peoples, explaining that "We tend to forget about our conquest of North America ... but most countries in the world see it as a colonial exercise."

=== Coverage of the Russian invasion of Ukraine ===
Like the Kremlin, Press TV used Moscow's term "special operation" to describe the early days of the 2022 war in Ukraine. It also used headlines describing massacred civilians in Bucha as a "fake attack" and "provocation" aimed at Russia.

== Staff resignations ==
=== Nick Ferrari ===
Nick Ferrari, a British radio presenter on LBC, resigned from his show on Press TV on 30 June 2009, following the response of the country's authorities to protests over the disputed Iranian presidential election. Ferrari told The Times that Press TV's news coverage had been "reasonably fair" until the election—but was not any longer. Ferrari admitted joining Press TV "was one of the dimmest career decisions of my life", although he also said he had not been pressured to adhere to any particular line.

=== Hassan Abdulrahman ===
In September 2009, The Times reported that Hassan Abdulrahman, born David Theodore Belfield, one of the chief editors of the Press TV website from the beginning of Press TV's news department, had stated that he left Press TV as chief online editor in July 2009 after the election in protest at its skewed coverage of that event. The Times quoted Abdulrahman as saying, "No, I don't think Press TV is about [real journalism]. By its nature, state journalism is not journalism. They have some programmes on there that might be, but generally it's not." In the article the Times also reported that Abdulrahman, who has also used the alias Dawud Salahuddin, is wanted by the FBI for shooting dead Ali Akbar Tabatabai, a former press attache at the pre-revolutionary Iranian embassy in Washington, in 1980. The Iranian government provided Belfield money and airfare to Tehran after he committed the killing, which he admitted to in 1995. (However, he denied that it was "murderous", stating that it was "an act of war...In Islamic religious terms, taking a life is sometimes sanctioned and even highly praised, and I thought that event was just such a time.")

=== Sheena Shirani ===
Sheena Shirani worked for Press TV from 2007 to January 2016 as an editor, producer and news presenter. She said that her news director Hamid Reza Emadi and studio manager Payam Afshar sexually harassed her for years, and published a recorded phone conversation with her boss Emadi. Press TV suspended both managers following the incident.

== Sanctions and restrictions ==
On 26 June 2008, Florida congressman Gus Bilirakis proposed to declare Press TV, Al-Alam News Network and several IRIB-affiliated channels as a "Specially Designated Global Terrorist entity."

In 2010, the Jammu and Kashmir government banned Press TV for airing video on the 2010 Qur'an-burning controversy saying "We have decided to impose a ban on the airing of Press TV broadcasts by local cable operators. We appeal to the people not to heed unverified reports about the alleged desecration of the Holy Koran which have only been aired by Press TV and no other television news channel in the world."

On 3 April 2012, Munich-based media regulator Bayerische Landeszentrale für neue Medien (BLM), announced it was removing Press TV from the SES Astra satellite, as they did not have a licence to broadcast in Europe.

In October 2012, Eutelsat stopped broadcasting Press TV on the order, the channel said, of the European Commission. The following month, the Hong Kong-based AsiaSat took Iranian channels off air in East Asia. The Islamic Republic of Iran Broadcasting managed to resume broadcasts after striking deals with smaller companies that are based in other countries.

Google blocked Press TV access to their Gmail and YouTube in April 2019; although the latter remained active no new content could be added. YouTube removed Press TV UK from its platform in January 2020. Press TV accused Google, which owns YouTube, of censorship. The Press TV UK channel appeared after the original was removed. In April 2019, Press TV reported that Google blocked their access (along with HispanTV) "without prior notice, citing "violation of policies", and that they received a message saying "your Google Account was disabled and can't be restored because it was used in a way that violates Google's policies." Although their YouTube channels remain open, no new content can be published. Press TV claimed that Google "has refused to offer an explanation for shutting down the accounts", and that they have not violated any of Google's listed policies.

On 15 September 2023, the United States Department of the Treasury added Press TV to the Office of Foreign Assets Control (OFAC)'s Specially Designated Nationals and Blocked Persons List.

=== UK licence revocation ===
Maziar Bahari, by then a British resident, complained to Ofcom, the regulatory authority for the telecommunication industries in the United Kingdom.

In May 2011, Ofcom ruled that Press TV was responsible for a serious breach of UK broadcasting rules by airing a 10-second interview with Maziar Bahari, accepting that it had been obtained under duress while he was imprisoned. Ofcom held a hearing in July 2011; the Press TV delegation included two British politicians who have worked as presenters for the channel. A fine of £100,000 ($155,000 in January 2012) was eventually imposed in November 2011, reversing an initial decision to revoke Press TV's licence. The extent of the fine was partly due to Press TV continuing to run the interview after warnings from Ofcom that the station had broken the Broadcasting Code.

Responding to the decision, Press TV said Ofcom was "influenced by powerful pro-Israeli politicians and US sympathisers" and "members of the royal family and the government". It maintained Bahari was an "MI6 contact person". Defenders of Press TV, such as Geoffrey Alderman and the broadcaster's legal representative, Farooq Bajwa, referred to a leaked American diplomatic cable dated 4 February 2010. The cable said the British government was then "exploring ways to limit the operations of the IRIB's Press TV service" in response to the jamming by the Iranian government of broadcasts by the BBC Persian Service and the Voice of America.

On 20 January 2012, Press TV's licence to broadcast in the UK was revoked by Ofcom with immediate effect. The investigation into the Bahari case had revealed the applying company's direct connection to Tehran, and that editorial control came from there. An invitation to change this in the licence had not been taken up by Press TV. Geoffrey Alderman, who had appeared on Press TV to put the Zionist case, criticised the Ofcom decision, describing it as "thoroughly deplorable as well as palpably cynical" and "an affront to freedom of expression". He said the location of Press TV's editorial control had not changed since the licence was granted. Press TV said Ofcom's decision was a "clear instance of censorship". However, it continued to broadcast in the UK via its YouTube and Facebook pages.

=== Website domain seizure ===
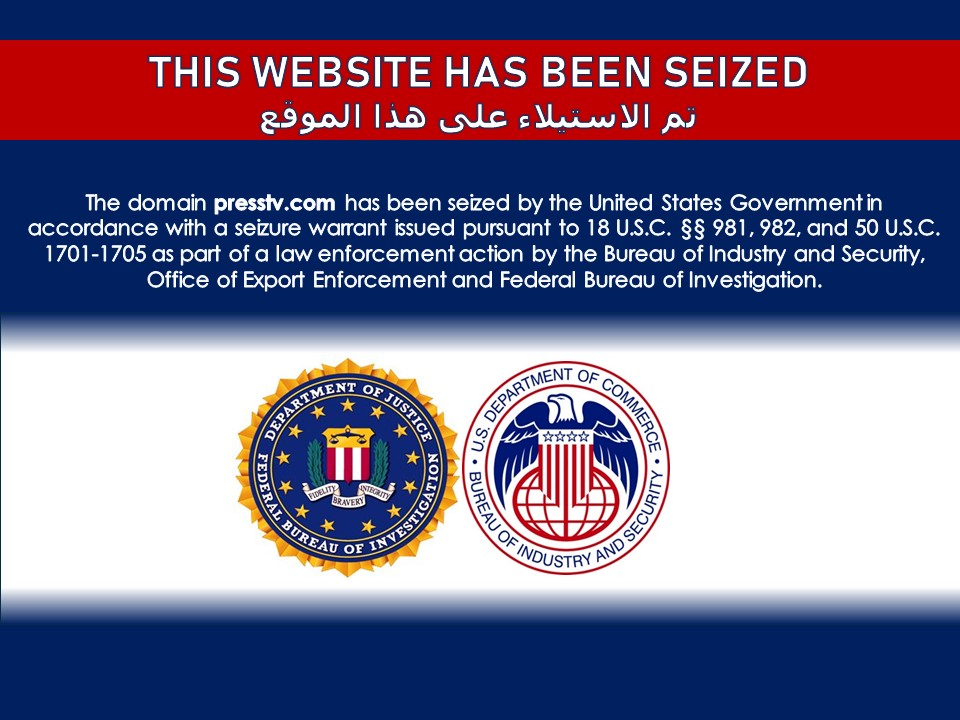
Image placed after seizure by the Department of Justice.

On 22 June 2021, the presstv.com domain was seized from a company based in the United States by the United States Department of Justice, shutting down Press TV's website and the websites of other Iranian media outlets. The Department of Justice said that these sites were sources of Iranian-linked disinformation and that proper licensing had not been acquired from the Office of Foreign Assets Control for the use of the domains. Soon thereafter, the broadcaster changed the domain name for its website to use the .ir top-level domain and was back online.

=== Australia ===
In 2023, Australia imposed sanctions on Press TV on the anniversary of the death of Mahsa Amini, due to its airing of forced confessions. While it does not broadcast in Australia, Press TV has continued to operate in the country.

On 21 October 2025, based on the Foreign Influence Transparency Scheme Act of 2018, the office of the Attorney-General's in Australia issued a provisional transparency notice which designated Press TV as a foreign government entity related to Iran.

On 18 November 2025, the designation of Press TV as a foreign government-related entity was finalised, and was formally listed on the Foreign Influence Transparency Scheme register. According to the scheme, foreign government associates are obligated to declare their political lobbying and communication activities, or face penalties of one to five years of imprisonment. This followed additional measures by the Australian government against Iranian state influence, including the expulsion of the Iranian ambassador, listing the Islamic Revolutionary Guard Corps as a terrorist organisation and accusations that Iran was behind the 2024 Melbourne synagogue attack. Press TV was criticised for being a propaganda arm of the Iranian regime which promotes disinformation, social division, and erosion of public trust in democratic institutions, as well as the defence of oppressive government conduct.

== Support for Press TV ==
In 2009, responding to Peter Wilby, Dominic Lawson and other critics, Mehdi Hasan, writing for the New Statesman, argued that "engaging with Iran, no matter who is in charge in Tehran, is a prerequisite for peace and progress in the region. The very fact that Press TV is Iranian-owned makes it the ideal English-language platform on which to do so."

American conspiracy theorist James Fetzer, whose views have often been featured by Press TV and Fars News, has stated that "Press TV, along with RT and Sputnik News, have become the gold standard for reporting on international events and developments".

== See also ==
- Media in Iran
- National Iranian Radio and Television
