= Aletejah TV =

Iraqi television channel

Aletejah TV قناة الاتجاه الفضائية
- Country: Iraq
- Broadcast area: Worldwide, via Satellite and Internet

Programming
- Language: Arabic

History
- Launched: 2008

Links
- Website: www.aletejahtv.iq

Availability

Streaming media
- Live stream: Watch (Aletejah TV English)

Aletejah TV (Arabic; قناة الاتجاه الفضائية) is an Iraqi television channel. The Arabic language network is owned and operated by Kata'ib Hezbollah, an Iraqi militia designated a Foreign Terrorist Organization by the Obama Administration in 2009. Aletejah TV has 500 employees, with offices located in Baghdad and Beirut.

== History and ownership ==
According to the Washington Institute for Near East Policy, Al-Etejah TV was launched in 2008 and is controlled by Kata'ib Hezbollah as a project of the group's media office. The profile states that the Iraqi Radio and Television Union played a major role in establishing the channel, and that in its early years it broadcast from studios in Beirut and Baghdad.

The same profile states that Al-Etejah later operated studios in Baghdad, Tehran, Beirut, Damascus, and Gaza, and that it was affiliated with the Islamic Radio and Television Union and the Iraqi Radio and Television Union. In 2020, the United States seized two Al-Etejah website domains, stating that they were unlawfully used by Kata'ib Hezbollah, a U.S.-designated terrorist organization.
