= Alghadeer TV =

Alghadeer TV قناة الغدير الفضائية
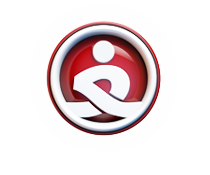
- Country: Iraq
- Broadcast area: Worldwide, via satellite and internet

Programming
- Language(s): English, Arabic

History
- Launched: 2003

Links
- Website: www.alghadeertv.net

Availability

Streaming media
- Live stream: alghadeertv.net/live-broadcast

Alghadeer TV (Arabic: قناة الغدير الفضائية) is an Iraqi satellite television channel based in Baghdad, Iraq. The channel was launched in 2003. The channel is owned by the Badr Organization.

== See also ==
- Television in Iraq
