= Al-Alam News Network =

Arabic news channel broadcasting from Iran

Al Alam News Network شبكه جهانى العالم
- Broadcast area: Iran; Arab world Worldwide
- Headquarters: Tehran

Programming
- Languages: Arabic, Persian
- Picture format: 16:9 (576i, SDTV) 16:9 (1080p, HDTV)

Ownership
- Owner: Islamic Republic of Iran Broadcasting
- Sister channels: Al Kawthar

History
- Launched: 23 February 2003; 23 years ago

Links
- Website: alalam.ir

Availability

Streaming media
- IRIB: Watch live

Al-Alam (Persian: شبكه جهانى العالم, lit. 'The World') is an Arabic news channel broadcasting from Iran and owned by the state-owned media corporation Islamic Republic of Iran Broadcasting (IRIB).

The network's political coverage tends to be the most popular; however, other subjects, such as commentaries, analysis, business and sports also get a share of the audience. Programs are broadcast to over 300 million Arab people around the world, with large audiences in the Persian Gulf and Mediterranean regions. The satellite channel can be received on five continents.

Al-Alam has news bureaus in Tehran, Beirut, and Baghdad. Unlike many other channels, it can be viewed in Iraq without the use of a satellite receiver, as it is able to use a terrestrial transmitter close to the Iran-Iraq border.

== History ==
An English-language website, known as Alalam News, was launched on 15 August 2006.

According to the Columbia Journalism Review, the channel's mission is to "help Iran emerge as the region's top power" by exploting Arab anger toward U.S. foreign policy, emphasizing Arabs and Iranians common Islamic faith, and capitalizing on the rift between Arabs and their governments.

In February 2003 ahead of the 2003 U.S. invasion of Iraq, Al-Alam began terrestrially broadcasting from Iran into Iraq. The channel's studios were located in Tehran, but the channel used a relay station on a hill near the Iran-Iraq border to broadcast into Iraq. Al-Alam is presented in Arabic, but all the anchors and newscasters are Iranian. The channel's primary target audience was at first Iraq's Shiite majority.

Al-Alam launched an Arabic-language website in 2004 and an English-language website in 2006. The Arabic and English sites do not mirror the other's content.

Alalam News Network launched its Persian website in April 2007 in order to cover news exclusively in the Persian language.

=== Capturing of British nationals by the Iranian Navy ===
Al-Alam was the first network to air videos of Royal Navy personnel captured by the Islamic Revolutionary Guard Corps Navy in 2007. During the 2007 Iranian seizure of Royal Navy personnel al-Alam reported with regard to British soldiers' confessions about the infringement of Iran's maritime sovereignty, Al-Alam news channel had an important portion in covering that incident. It was the forerunner in transmitting the soldiers' confessions, and was the main and prime source for media coverage in this respect.

=== 2011 Bahraini protests ===
During the Shiite anti-government protests in Bahrain, the Al-Alam signal was repeatedly jammed. Allegations all point to the fact that Al Mukhabarat Al A'amah, the Saudi Intelligence Agency, was traced back to for evidence of this crime. The jamming attacks were reportedly caused by installations capable of interfering with Al-Alam's frequencies on the Badr satellite from a Saudi transmitter. This act of sabotage and illegal interference with free media has yet to be addressed in an international case.

=== Al-Alam Syria ===
A sister channel, Al-Alam Syria, was launched in 2017, with the intention to have more generalist programming compared to Al-Alam.

== Geographical coverage ==
Al-Alam news channel covers all parts of the globe, with the exception of the southern part of African continent, using the following satellites: Hot Bird 8, Eutelsat 7 West A and Galaxy 19. It is also broadcast terrestrially on VHF channel E4 from high ground near the Iraqi border.

== Controversies ==
Due to the fact that the channel has linked with the Islamic Republic, it is accused of being an arming channel/tool for the Iranian Government and its propaganda. Critics in the Arab World consider it to have encouraged Shia extremism in the Arab World.

=== Potential designation as a 'terrorist entity' ===
On 26 June 2008, the United States House of Representatives has proposed to declare Al-Alam, the English-language Press TV, and several IRIB-affiliated channels as a "Specially Designated Global Terrorist entity" sponsored by Florida congressman Gus Bilirakis. The proposed resolution calls the broadcast of 'incitement to violence' against Americans in Middle Eastern media while Bilirakis claimed that as Iranian state-run TV channels broadcast 'the coverage of rallies and speeches in which Iranian leaders, clerics, children, and mass audience have declared 'Death to America!' due to broadcasting incitement of violence against Americans.

In June 2021, the U.S. government seized the websites of several Iranian state-linked news websites including Al-Alam's Arabic-language channel that were linked to Iranian disinformation efforts.

=== Conviction of correspondents in Israel ===
On 14 June 2009, a Jerusalem court sentenced a correspondent of Al-Alam, Khodr Shahine, and his assistant, Mohammed Sarhan, to two months imprisonment for reporting on the Israeli land offensive against the Gaza Strip on January 3 prior to the lifting of Israeli military press censorship.

== See also ==
- Al-Hurra
- BBC Arabic
- CGTN Arabic
- RT Arabic
- TRT Arabi
