= List of television networks by country =

This is a list of television networks by country. For lists of television stations by country, see Lists of television channels (sorted by continent and country) or Lists of television channels by country.

== Afghanistan ==
1. Ariana Television Network
2. Shamshad Media Network

== Albania ==
1. RTSH (Radio Televizioni Shqiptar)
2. RTSH 1
3. RTSH 2
4. Top Channel
5. Top News
6. RTV Klan
7. Vizion Plus
8. Alsat
9. Albanian Screen
10. ABC News
11. Euronews Albania
12. A2 CNN
13. Fax News
14. News 24
15. Ora News
16. Report TV
17. Syri Television
18. Scan TV
19. BBF
20. Nesёr TV
21. In TV
22. Kukёs TV
23. Club TV
24. UTV
25. MCN TV
26. Super Sonic TV

== Algeria ==
1. EPTV (Public Establishment of Television): TV1, TV3, TV4, TV5, TV6, TV7, TV8, TV9, Canal Algérie, AL24 News
2. Ennahar TV
3. Echorouk TV

== Andorra ==
1. ATV (Andorra Televisió)

== Australia ==
Here's the full high definition (HD) digital terrestrial television channels in Australia :

1. ABC TV
2. SBS
3. Seven
4. Nine
5. 10
6. WIN Television
7. Imparja Television

== Bahrain ==
1. STAR TV (Satellite Television for Asian Region Bahrain)

== Bangladesh ==
1. BTV

== Barbados ==
1. Caribbean Broadcasting Corporation
2. Caribbean Media Corporation
3. Public Broadcast Service

== Belarus ==
1. National State Television and Radio Company of the Republic of Belarus

== Belgium ==
Name	Owner	Description	Language	Availability
Arte Belgique	Cooperation between RTBF and ARTE	Cultural network	French	Cable networks in Wallonia, Brussels and Flanders – Satellite
Ketnet	VRT	daytime children's network, after 8 pm: additional VRT-channel	Dutch	Cable networks in Flanders, Brussels and Wallonia – Satellite – DVB-T in Flanders and Brussels
Prime & Sporting Telenet	Telenet	pay-TV with the channels Prime Star, Prime Action, Prime Fezztival, Prime Family, Prime Series, Sporting 1–8, Sporting Golf	Dutch	Telenet cable network in Flanders and Brussels (Prime Star, Sporting 1 & Sporting 2 in HD)

== Bermuda ==
1. Bermuda Broadcasting Company
2. NBC
3. ABC
4. CBS

== Bhutan ==
1. BBS-TV (Bhutan Broadcasting Service)

== Bolivia ==
1. Red Uno de Bolivia

== Bosnia and Herzegovina ==
1. Cartoon Network
2. Eurosport
3. NASN
4. VH1

== Botswana ==
1. Botswana TV

== Brazil ==
Ranking	Network	Founder	Currently	Notes
#1	TV Globo	Roberto Marinho	Roberto Irineu Marinho	Membership Chairman
#2	RecordTV	Paulo Machado de Carvalho	Edir Macedo	Edir Macedo 90% and Ester Bezerra 10%
#3	SBT	Silvio Santos	Silvio Santos	
#4	Band	João Jorge Saad	Johnny Saad	1999–present
#5	RedeTV!	Amilcare Dallevo and Marcelo de Carvalho	Amilcare Dallevo and Marcelo de Carvalho	50% each
#6	Cultura	Assis Chateaubriand	Marcos Mendonça	Belongs to Fundação Padre Anchieta. Owner Government of the State of São Paulo
#7	Gazeta	Emílio Garrastazu Médici	Fundação Cásper Líbero	
#8	Record News	Edir Macedo	Luiz Claudio Costa	

== British Indian Ocean Territory ==
1. British Forces Broadcasting Service
2. Armed Forces Radio and Television Service

== Burundi ==
1. RTNB (Radiodiffusion et Télévision Nationale du Burundi)

== Central African Republic ==
1. Télévision Centrafricaine

== Chad ==
1. Télé Tchad

== Colombia ==
1. Telecaribe
2. Telepacífico

== Democratic Republic of the Congo ==
1. RTNC (Radio Télévision Nationale Congolaise)

== Republic of the Congo ==
1. RTC (Radiodiffusion Télévision Congolaise)
2. Africanews
3. MTV Congo

== Costa Rica ==
1. Enlace TBN

== Cuba ==
1. Tele Rebelde
2. TeleSUR

== Djibouti ==
1. Radio Television of Djibouti

== Dominica ==
1. DBC (Dominica Broadcasting Corporation)

== Ecuador ==
1. Ecuavisa
2. Gama TV
3. Hallmark Channel Latin America
4. TC Television
5. Teleamazonas
6. TeleSUR

== Egypt ==
1. Aghapy TV
2. Al Ahly TV
3. Al Hayah
4. Al Hayah Drama
5. Al Nahar TV
6. Al Nahar Drama
7. Al-Nas TV
8. Alexandria Channel
9. Al Kahera Wal Nas
10. Al Kahera Wal Nas 2
11. Al-Qahera News
12. Cairo Channel
13. Cairo Cinema
14. Cairo Cinema 2
15. Cairo Drama
16. Cairo Comedy
17. Cairo Musalsalat
18. Cairo Film
19. Cairo Fight
20. Cairo Zaman
21. Canal Channel
22. CBC TV
23. CBC Drama
24. CBC Sofra
25. Channel 1
26. Channel 2
27. CTV (Egyptian TV channel)
28. Delta Channel
29. DMC TV
30. DMC Drama
31. Egypt Holy Quran
32. Egyptian TV
33. Extra News
34. Extra Live
35. Mazzika
36. Mehwar TV
37. Nile Cinema
38. Nile Comedy
39. Nile Culture
40. Nile Drama
41. Nile Educational
42. Nile Family
43. Nile Life
44. Nile News
45. Nile Sports
46. Nile TV International
47. ON E
48. ON Drama
49. ON Sport
50. ON Sport 2
51. Panorama Action
52. Panorama Comedy
53. Panorama Drama
54. Panorama Drama 2
55. Panorama Film
56. Sada El Balad
57. Sada El Balad Drama
58. Tanweer channel
59. TeN TV
60. Thebes Channel
61. Upper Channel
62. Zamalek TV

== Equatorial Guinea ==
1. Radio Nacional de Guinea Equatorial

== Eritrea ==
1. Eri-TV

== Falkland Islands ==
1. KTV
2. BFBS TV 1
3. BFBS TV 2 (Mount Pleasant base area only)
4. BBC World News

== Faroe Islands ==
1. Kringvarp Føroya

== Fiji ==
1. Fiji One
2. Fiji Television
3. Sky Entertainment (SKY Pacific)
4. FBC TV
5. Mai TV

== Finland ==
1. Viasat Sport Finland
2. Viasat Sport HD
3. Hallmark Channel Scandilux
4. Jim (former Nelonen Plus)
5. Nelonen Prime
6. MTV Nordic (Replaced by MTV Finland)
7. MTV3 (Mainos-TV) – commercial station
8. MTV Fakta
9. MTV Max
10. Nelonen (Channel Four Finland) – commercial station
11. Sub
12. MTV Juniori
13. MTV Leffa
14. Nickelodeon Finland
15. Kutonen
16. Nelonen Pro 1
17. Nelonen Pro 2
18. Yleisradio (Yle, Finnish Broadcasting Company) – state broadcaster

== French Guiana ==
Most channels from France are available in French Guiana.

1. France 3
2. France 24
3. France 5
4. France Ô
5. MTV Hits
6. MTV Music
7. MTV Dance
8. MTV Rocks
9. Nickelodeon
10. France 1
11. France 2
12. TF1
13. France 4
14. TFX

== French Polynesia ==
1. France 1
2. France 2
3. France Ô
4. RFO Polynésie
5. TNTV (Tahiti Nui Television)

== Gabon ==
1. Gabon Télévision

== Gambia ==
1. GRTS TV (Gambia Radio & Television Service)

== Georgia ==
1. GPB (Georgian Public Broadcasting)
2. Imedi TV
3. Rustavi 2

== Ghana ==
1. MTA Ghana
2. Multi TV
3. GTV (Ghana)
4. MTV Base Africa
5. Nickelodeon Africa
6. Metro TV (Metropolitan Entertainment TV)
7. TV Africa
8. TV3
9. TopTV (Ghana)
10. Homebase
11. Light TV
12. Smile
13. TV1 Ghana
14. TV2 Ghana
15. wise TV
16. ATN

== Gibraltar ==
1. GBC Television (Gibraltar Broadcasting Corporation)
2. BBC World News
3. BBC One

== Greenland ==
1. KNR (Kalaallit Nunaata Radioa)

== Grenada ==
1. Gayelle - The Channel

== Guadeloupe ==
1. France Ô

== Guinea ==
1. Radio Télévision Guinéenne (RTG)

== Haiti ==
1. TQ (Tele Quisqueya)
2. TNH (Télévision Nationale d'Haïti)

== Honduras ==
1. JBN (Jesus Broadcasting Network)
2. Maya TV

== Hungary ==
1. ATV 47
2. FEM TV
3. Joy TV
4. Magyar ATV
5. MTV1
6. MTV2
7. MTV Plusz
8. M-Sat
9. M+
10. Ötös Csatorna
11. Póen
12. RTL Klub
13. RTL II
14. Story4
15. Top TV
16. TV1
17. TV2
18. TV2 Klub
19. TV3
20. TV4

== India ==
1. Disney Star
2. Zee Entertainment Enterprises
3. Viacom18
4. Culver Max Entertainment
5. Shemaroo Entertainment
6. Warner Bros. Discovery India
7. Doordarshan
8. Sun TV Network
9. ETV Network
10. Odisha Television Network
11. Sidharth TV Network
12. 9X Media
13. B4U
14. Pen India Limited
15. Sri Adhikari Brothers Television Network Ltd
16. Media Worldwide Limited
17. The Walt Disney Company India
18. The Times Group
19. ViacomCBS Networks EMEAA
20. Fox Networks Group
21. A&E Networks
22. TV18
23. Sony
24. BBC Studios
25. Living Media
26. ABP Group
27. CNBC Asia
28. ITV Network
29. Amitabh Bachchan Corporation
30. NDTV
31. Excel Entertainment
32. Network18 Group
33. Sahara India Pariwar
34. Zee Media Corporation
35. TV Today Network
36. Essel Group
37. NBCUniversal
38. Prasar Bharati
39. Sony Pictures Sports Network
40. Paramount Global
41. Star Sports India

== Iran ==
1. Andisheh TV
2. Channel 1
3. Channel 2
4. Channel 3
5. Channel 4
6. Farsi 1
7. Gem TV
8. Tehran TV
9. IRINN
10. ITN1
11. ITN2
  1. IRIB Quran
12. IRIB World Service
13. Jaam-e Jam
14. Jame-Jam TV Network 1
15. Jame-Jam TV Network 2
16. Jame-Jam TV Network 3
17. Khorasan TV
18. Mazandaran TV
19. OITN
20. Omid-e-Iran OITN
21. PBC
  1. Tapesh
  2. Tapesh 2 Music Channel
22. Press TV
23. PMC
24. Sahar (TV station)
25. Salaam TV
26. Your TV

== Iraq ==
1. Rudaw Media Network – Rudaw.net
2. Waar TV
3. Al-Baghdadia TV
4. Al Iraqiya (Iraqi Media Network)
5. Al Sharqiya
6. Al Sumaria
7. Al Forat Network
8. Baghdad Satellite Channel
9. Asia Network Television
10. STAR TV (Satellite Television for Asian Region Iraq)
11. Türkmeneli TV

== Ireland ==
Most channels from the United Kingdom are available in Ireland.

1. Animal Planet Ireland
2. BBC Northern Ireland
3. Boomerang Europe
4. Cartoon Network
5. 3e – independent station
6. Channel 9 – Community channel in Derry
7. City Channel – independent station in Dublin
8. CNBC Europe
9. CNN International (Europe/MiddleEast/Africa)
10. Cúla 4 – Irish speaking children's channel
11. Discovery Channel Ireland
12. E4
13. EuroNews
14. Eurosport
15. Fox TV
16. National Geographic Channel Europe
17. Raidió Teilifís Éireann (RTÉ) – Public Service broadcaster
  1. RTÉ One
  2. RTÉ2 (Not RTÉ Two)
  3. RTÉ News Now
  4. RTÉjr
18. Setanta Sports 1
19. Setanta Sports 2
20. Setanta Sports News
21. Sky (BSkyB – satellite network)
  1. Sky Cinema
  2. Sky1
  3. Sky Sports
22. TG4 (Irish language semi-independent station)
23. Viacom Ireland
  1. MTV Rocks
  2. MTV Base
  3. MTV Dance
  4. MTV Hits
  5. MTV
  6. Nick Jr.
  7. Nickelodeon Ireland
  8. VH1
  9. VH1 Classic (Replaced by MTV Classic)
24. Virgin Media Television
  1. Virgin Media One – independent station
  2. Virgin Media Two – independent station
  3. Virgin Media Three – independent station
25. UTV – part of the ITV network

Note: BBC NI and UTV are based in Northern Ireland, RTÉ and Virgin Media Television in the Republic of Ireland. However all four are available to most viewers throughout the island of Ireland, with UTV now accepting advertising from the Republic and targeting some of its programmes specifically at viewers in the Republic. Access to the Republic's stations (but in particular TG4) in Northern Ireland was a requirement of the Good Friday Agreement peace deal in 1998, but this has yet to be fully implemented (mainly due to frequency spectrum issues).

== Ivory Coast ==
1. La Première – (Radiodiffusion Television Ivoirienne RTI)
2. MTV Ivory Coast (MTV Ivorian Public Music Channel)
3. MTV Base Africa
4. RTB Perdana (Formerly RTB1)
5. France 24
6. TFX (Formerly NT1)

== Japan ==
1. JBC (Japan Broadcasting Corporation)
2. Nippon News Network (NNN)/Nippon TV
3. Japan News Network (JNN)/TBS
4. Fuji News Network (FNN)/Fuji TV
5. All-Nippon News Network (ANN)/TV Asahi
6. TV Tokyo Network (TXN)/TV Tokyo
7. Japanese Association of Independent Television Stations (JAITS)

== Jordan ==
1. JRTV (Al Ordoniyah)
2. STAR TV (Satellite Television for Asian Region Jordan)

== Kazakhstan ==
1. CaspioNet
2. Astana
3. Kazakhstan 1

== Kenya ==
1. Citizen TV
2. KBC (Kenya Broadcasting Corporation)
3. KTN (Kenya Television Network)
4. NTV Kenya
5. UTV
6. Three (New Zealand)
7. Kiss TV
8. Ebru TV

== Kiribati ==
1. Kiribati TV
2. Sky Pacific

== North Korea ==
1. Korean Central Television (KCTV)
2. Mansudae Television
3. Athletic Television
4. Ryongnamsan Television

== Kosovo ==
- RTK (Radio Television of Kosovo)
- RTK 1
- RTK 2
- RTK 3
- RTK 4
- RTK Sat
- RTV21
- Kohavision
- Klan Kosova
- T7
- RTV Dukagjini
- ATV
- Kanal 10 (formerly Rrokum TV)
- TëVë 1
- First Channel
- PRO1
- Arta News

== Kurdistan ==
1. AsoSat
2. Badinan Sat
3. Çira TV
4. Gali Kurdistan
5. Hawler TV
6. Jamawar Kurdistan
7. Kanal 4
8. KNN TV
9. Kirkuk TV
10. Komala TV
11. Komar TV
12. Korek TV
13. Kurd 1
14. Kurd Channel
15. Kurdistan TV
16. KurdMax
17. KurdMax Pepule
18. Kurdistan Parliament Channel
19. Kurdsat
20. Med Muzik
21. Med Nûçe
22. Newroz TV
23. NRT TV
24. NRT 2
25. Pelistank TV
26. Payam TV
27. Roj TV
28. Rojhelat TV
29. Ronahi TV
30. Rudaw TV
31. Speda TV
32. Sterk TV
33. Tishk TV
34. Vin TV
35. Waar TV
36. Zagros TV
37. Zaro TV
38. Zarok TV

== Kuwait ==
1. Television State of Kuwait: KTV 1, KTV 2, KTV 3, KTV 3 Sport Plus, Kuwait Plus
2. Alrai TV
3. STAR TV (Satellite Television for Asian Region Kuwait)

== Kyrgyzstan ==
1. KTR (Kyrgyz Television)
2. Star TV (Satellite Television for Asian Region Kyrgyzstan)

== Laos ==
1. Lao National Television (LNTV1, LNTV3)
2. Lao Public Security Television (LAO PSTV)

== Lebanon ==
1. Al Jadeed
2. Al Manar
3. Fashion TV Arabiya (Ceased)
4. Future TV
5. Lebanese Broadcasting Corporation
6. Mlive
7. Murr Television
8. National Broadcasting Network
9. Orange TV
10. Télé Liban
11. Télé Lumière

== Lesotho ==
1. Lesotho Television

== Liberia ==
1. LNTV (Liberia Broadcasting System)
2. Clar TV, private.[7]
3. DC TV
4. Power TV
5. Real TV

== Libya ==
1. Libya TV
2. Libya Alhurra TV
3. 218TV

== Lithuania ==
1. Lietuvos rytas TV
2. LRT televizija
3. LRT Plius
4. LNK
5. BTV
6. TV6
7. TV1
8. TV3
9. Info TV
10. 2TV
11. TV8
12. LRT Lituanica

== Luxembourg ==
1. Chamber TV – owned by Chambre des Députés in Luxembourgish and French
2. Hallmark Channel Scandilux
3. Luxe.tv
4. RTL Group
5. DPG Media & Groupe Rossel
6. Mediawan Thematics
7. Satmode
8. Tele 2

== North Macedonia ==
1. Balkanika Music TV
2. Cartoon Network RSEE
3. Disney Channel Europe
4. MKTV Sat
5. MTV – Parliament Channel
6. VH1 and MTV2 (the national channels, until 2003–2004 MTV2 used to be just about the same like MTV1 and the Parliament Channel used to be titled MTV3 and was intended for the minorities living in Macedonia. Back in 2003–2004 MTV3 transformed into MTV2 and MTV2 was retitled as Parliament Channel, having broadcast only the National Parliament discussions).
7. MTV Adria
8. Nickelodeon Europe
9. SITEL (second most watched channel)
10. Telma (Telma is fourth privately owned national channel in R. of Macedonia)

== Malawi ==
1. Malawi Broadcasting Corporation

== Malaysia ==
TV3

== Mali ==
1. ORTM
2. Africable

== Moldova ==
1. Moldova 1
2. Moldova 2
3. Transnistria 1

== Monaco ==
1. TV Monaco

== Mongolia ==
1. Mongolian National Broadcaster (MNB)
2. Ulaanbaatar Broadcasting System (UBS)
3. Edutainment TV (Боловсрол суваг)
4. SBN (Supervision Broadcasting Network)

== Morocco ==
1. SNRT
2. 2M (TV channel)
3. Medi 1 TV

== Mozambique ==
1. TVM (Mozambique Television Network)

== Myanmar ==
1. Democratic Voice of Burma (DVB)
2. MRTV (Myanmar Television)
3. MRTV-3 (Myanmar Television 3)
4. MRTV-4 (Myanmar Television 4)

== Namibia ==
1. NBC (Namibian Broadcasting Corporation)
2. ONE – Africa Television

== Nauru ==
1. NTV (Nauru Television)

== Nepal ==
1. ABC Television
2. AP1 Television
3. Avenues TV
4. Channel Nepal
5. Kantipur Television
6. Nepal Television
7. Nickelodeon India

== Netherlands ==
In the Netherlands, the television market is divided between a number of commercial networks and a system of public broadcasters sharing three channels.

1. Netherlands Public Broadcasting
2. From RTL Nederland
3. From Talpa

== Niger ==
1. Télé Sahel
2. Tal TV
3. Tenere TV
4. Dounia TV

== Nigeria ==
1. 1 Music
  1. ACBN International
2. ACNN TV
  1. Aforevo Music TV
  2. Aforevo Francais
3. Africa Health TV
4. African Broadcasting Network
5. Afro Hits TV
6. AIT (Africa Independent TV)
  1. AIT International
  2. AIT Lagos
  3. AIT Parliamentary
7. Akwa TV
8. Al-Afrikiy Islamic Television
9. AMC TV (Startimes Channel 117)
10. Arewa24 TV
11. Artmosfair
  1. Artmosfair +
12. AWA TV
13. BCS StarCross TV
14. Brekete Family TV
15. Channels TV
16. CMTV
17. Cool TV
18. Core TV News
19. DBN (Degue Broadcasting Network)
20. DASAMAL TV NETWORK
21. Deeper Christian Life Ministry Channel
22. DNI
23. Dog Racing
24. Dream God TV
25. E-Stars TV
26. Ebony Life
27. Edo Broadcasting Service
28. Elijah's Voice
29. Emerald TV
30. Emmanuel TV
31. Evangel TV
32. Family Network Africa
33. FAPM TV
34. Farin Wata TV
35. Favour TV
36. Fortis TV
37. Free Indeed, TV
38. Fresh Oil TV
39. G-Rhythm
40. Ga Naku TV
41. Galaxy TV
42. GNN TV
43. GWB Health TV
44. Haba TV
45. Harvest TV
46. Hola TV
47. Hosanna Broadcast Network
48. ibakatv
49. Idan TV
50. Irawo TV
51. iROKO Play
52. Isi Mbido
53. IT
54. ITV
55. ITVS
56. KAFTAN TV
57. Kennis Music Channel
58. Kingdom Africa TV (DSTV channel 345)
59. Kingdom Life Network TV
60. Kuungana Africa TV
61. Liberation TV
62. Livestyle Afrika
63. Lighthouse TV
64. Lucky Balls TV
65. Lumen Christi TV Network
66. Manifestation TV
67. Mantle TV
68. MCN Africa
  1. MCN Entertainment
69. Mercy TV
70. Messianic World Plus
71. MBI (Minaj Broadcast International)
72. Moneymart TV
73. Montage Sports News
74. More Grace TV
75. Mount Zion TV
76. MY TV Africa
  1. MY TV Hausa
  2. MY TV More
  3. MY TV Series
  4. MY TV Toonz
  5. MY TV Yoruba
77. Nigezie
78. NN24
79. Noma TV
80. NTA (Nigeria Television Authority)
  1. NTA Benin
  2. NTA Entertainment
  3. NTA Lagos
81. Odenigbo TV
82. Ogun Stage TV
83. OnMax TV
84. OnTV
85. Orisun TV
86. Osasogie Gospel TV
87. OSBC
88. Osun State Broadcasting Corporation
89. Oyo State Broadcasting Corporation
90. People's TV
91. Power Broadcasting Network
92. Quest TV
93. R2 TV
94. Rave TV
95. Rayuwa TV
96. Restoration TV
97. Rhema TV
98. Rivers Stage TV
99. ROK TV
100. School On Air
101. Smash TV
102. SoundCity TV
103. Spice TV
104. ST Yoruba
105. Star Bollywood
  1. Star Bollywood Swahili
  2. Star Dahin Kowa
  3. Star +
  4. Star Sports Arena
  5. Star Sports Focus
  6. Star Sports Premium
  7. Star Sports Life
  8. Star Sports Premium HD
  9. Star World Football
  10. Star Zone

== Norway ==
1. Viasport
2. Metropol TV
3. MTV Nordic (Replaced by MTV Norway)
4. Nickelodeon Scandinavia
5. NRK
6. Nyhetskanalen
7. Rikstoto Direkte
8. SportN
9. Tippeliga
10. TV Norge
11. VOX
12. FEM

== Pakistan ==
1. AAG TV
2. Aaj TV
3. ARY Digital Network
4. ARY Digital
5. ARY One World
6. ARY Zouq
7. Asset Plus
8. ATV
9. ATV News
10. AVT Khyber
11. Business Plus
12. Channel 5
13. City 42
14. CNBC Pakistan
15. Dawn News
16. Dharti TV
17. Din News (Din News)
18. DM Digital Network
19. Dunya TV
20. Express News
21. Eye Television Network
22. Fashion TV Pakistan
23. Filmazia
24. Film World
25. Filmax
26. Fun TV
27. G Kaboom
28. Geo News
29. Geo TV Network
30. Geo Super
31. Haq TV
32. HBO Pakistan
33. Hum TV
34. H Now Entertainment
35. Indus TV Network
36. Indus Vision
37. Indus Music
38. Indus News
39. ILIM TV
40. Kashish TV
41. Khyber News
42. Kook
43. KTN
44. Madani Channel
45. Mehran TV
46. Metro One
47. MTV Pakistan (Defunct as of 2011)
48. Music One
49. News One
50. Nickelodeon Pakistan
51. nVibe
52. Noor TV
53. Play
54. Prime TV
55. PTV Global
56. PTV Home
57. PTV News
58. PTV Mehran
59. PTV Bolan
60. Punjab TV
61. QTV
62. LABBAIK TV
63. Rohi TV
64. Roshni TV
65. Royal News
66. Rung TV
67. Samaa
68. Such Tv
69. Sanjh TV Network
70. Star Asia (Star Asia News)
71. StarLite TV
72. Style 360
73. Sun
74. Sindh TV
75. Sindh TV News
76. The Musik
77. TV 2 Day
78. Uni Plus
79. Value TV
80. Virtual University
81. Waaj TV
82. Waqt TV
83. Waqt News
84. Wikkid Plus
85. Zam TV
86. Zaiqa TV

== Palestine ==
1. Ma'an (Palestinian Authority)

== Paraguay ==
1. Paravisión
2. SNT
3. Telefuturo
4. MTV Hits Latin America
5. Nickelodeon Latin America

== Peru ==
1. MTV Latin America
2. Nickelodeon Latin America
3. Latina Televisión
4. TV Peru

== Philippines ==
- ABS-CBN (now defunct; active as a broadcast syndication provider)
- GMA Network
- Intercontinental Broadcasting Corporation (IBC)
- People's Television Network (PTV) (flagship state broadcaster)
- Radio Philippines Network (RPN)
- TV5 Network

== Portugal ==
More Portuguese TV stations in "List of television stations in Portugal"

== Qatar ==
1. Al Jazeera
2. Alkass
3. Baraem TV
4. Qatar TV
5. Jeem TV
6. Alrayyan TV
7. beIN Sports
8. Al Araby TV

== Réunion ==
1. MTV Europe

== Saint Barthélemy ==
1. France Inter

== São Tomé and Príncipe ==
1. RTP Africa

== Saudi Arabia ==
1. Al Arabiya
2. Almajd TV Network
3. Saudi TV
4. Zee Entertainment Enterprises (Zee Network Asia)

== Seychelles ==
1. SBC (Seychelles Broadcasting Corporation)

== Slovakia ==
1. SPI Slovakia
2. Rozhlas a televízia Slovenska

== Somalia ==
1. Shabelle TV
2. ETN (Eastern Television Network)
3. SBC TV (Somali Broadcasting Corporation)

== South Africa ==
1. Al Jazeera
2. Animal Planet Africa
3. Cartoon Network
1. CNBC Africa
2. M-Net
3. MTV
4. Nickelodeon Africa
5. Nick Jr. Africa
6. Nicktoons Africa
7. SABC (South African Broadcasting Corporation)
8. Style Network
9. TBN Africa

== Spain ==
1. FORTA (association of public regional broadcasting networks):

== South Sudan ==
1. Southern Sudan Television

== Suriname ==
1. Sky TV

== Switzerland ==
1. RTL Group
2. SRG SSR public Swiss television

== Syria ==
1. STAR TV (Satellite Television for Asian Region Syria)
2. Syria TV

== Tajikistan ==
See: List of channels in Tajikistan

== Thailand ==
1. MTV Thailand
2. Nickelodeon Asia
3. Cartoon Network Asia

== Tonga ==
1. Oceania Broadcasting Network

== Uganda ==
1. UBC (Uganda Broadcasting Corporation)
2. HGTV

== United Arab Emirates ==
1. Abu Dhabi Sports Channel
2. Abu Dhabi Sports 2
3. Abu Dhabi Sports 3
4. Abu Dhabi TV
5. Abu Dhabi TV +1
6. AEN (ADD)
7. Al Arabiya
8. CNN
9. Cartoon Network Arabic
10. Cartoon Network Middle East and North Africa
11. Decision Makers TV
12. CNBC Arabiya (ME Business News)
13. Discovery Channel Middle East
14. Disney Channel
15. Disney XD (Closed as of 2021)
16. Dubai Sports Channel
17. Dubai TV
18. Home Cinema (Showtime Arabia)
19. Infinity TV
20. MBC (Middle East Broadcasting Centre)
  1. MBC 2
  2. MBC 3
  3. MBC 4
21. MET (Middle East Television)
22. Nickelodeon (Showtime Arabia)
23. Paramount Comedy Channel (Showtime Arabia)
24. PMC (Persian Music Channel)
25. Prime Sports
26. Sama Dubai
27. Sharjah TV
28. Spacetoon Arabic
29. Spacetoon English (defunct)
30. Spicy
  1. Channel [V] India
  2. Channel [V] International
  3. Fox News Channel
  4. Fox Sports
  5. ITV Choice
  6. Nat Geo Adventure UAE
  7. National Geographic Adventure UAE
  8. Sky News
  9. Star Movies
  10. Star News
  11. Star World
31. Style UK (Showtime Arabia)
32. Ten Sports India
33. Ten Sports Pakistan
34. The Movie Channel (Showtime Arabia)
35. TV Land (Showtime Arabia)

== United Kingdom ==
1. BBC
  1. BBC One
  2. BBC Two
  3. BBC Three
  4. BBC Four
  5. BBC Five
  6. BBC News
  7. BBC Parliament
  8. CBBC
  9. CBeebies
  10. BBC Alba (Scottish Gaelic)
  11. S4C (Welsh Language)
2. ITV plc
  1. Independent Television (ITV)
    1. ITV1
    2. UTV
    3. ITV2
    4. ITV3
    5. ITV4
    6. ITVBe
  2. Scottish Television (STV)
    1. STV
3. Channel Four Television Corporation
  1. Channel 4
  2. 4seven
  3. Film4
  4. E4
  5. More4
  6. T4
4. The Box Plus Network
  1. The Box
  2. Box Upfront
  3. Box Hits
  4. Kiss TV
  5. Magic
  6. Q
  7. Kerrang!
5. Paramount Networks UK & Australia
  1. 5
  2. 5Star
  3. 5USA
  4. 5Select
  5. Comedy Central
  6. Milkshake!
  7. 5Action
  8. MTV
  9. Nickelodeon
  10. Nick Jr.
  11. Nicktoons
6. Sky UK Limited
  1. Sky Max
  2. Sky Showcase
  3. Sky Replay
  4. Sky Witness
  5. Sky Crime
  6. Sky Atlantic
  7. Sky Arts
  8. Sky Comedy
  9. Sky Challenge
  10. Sky News
  11. Sky Sports (Main Event, Premier League, Football, Cricket, Golf, F1, Action, Arena, News, Mix, Racing), Box Office
  12. Sky Cinema (Action, Comedy, Disney, Drama, Family, Greats, Hits, Premiere, Sci Fi & Horror, Select, Thriller)
7. Warner Bros. Discovery Sports Europe
  1. TNT Sports 1
  2. TNT Sports 2
  3. TNT Sports 3
  4. TNT Sports 4
  5. TNT Sports Box Office
  6. TNT Sports Ultimate
8. Narrative Capital
  1. Pop
  2. Great! TV
  3. Great! Movies
  4. Great! Action
  5. Tiny Pop
9. WarnerMedia International
  1. Cartoonito
  2. Boomerang
  3. Cartoon Network

== Vanuatu ==
1. ABC
2. SBS
3. Southern Cross Central
4. Imparja Television
5. Ten Central

== Vietnam ==
- VTV – National public broadcaster, operates ten channels and dozen Pay TV channels network:
- VTC – National digital broadcaster, includes many different 15 channels
- Ho Chi Minh City TV – The first TV station in Vietnam, includes 8 free-to-air channels

== Yemen ==
1. STAR TV (Satellite Television for Asian Region Yemen)

== Zambia ==
1. ZNBC (Zambia National Broadcasting Corporation)

== Zimbabwe ==
1. ZBC (Zimbabwe Broadcasting Corporation)
