= Egyptian Television Network =

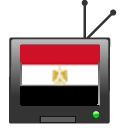

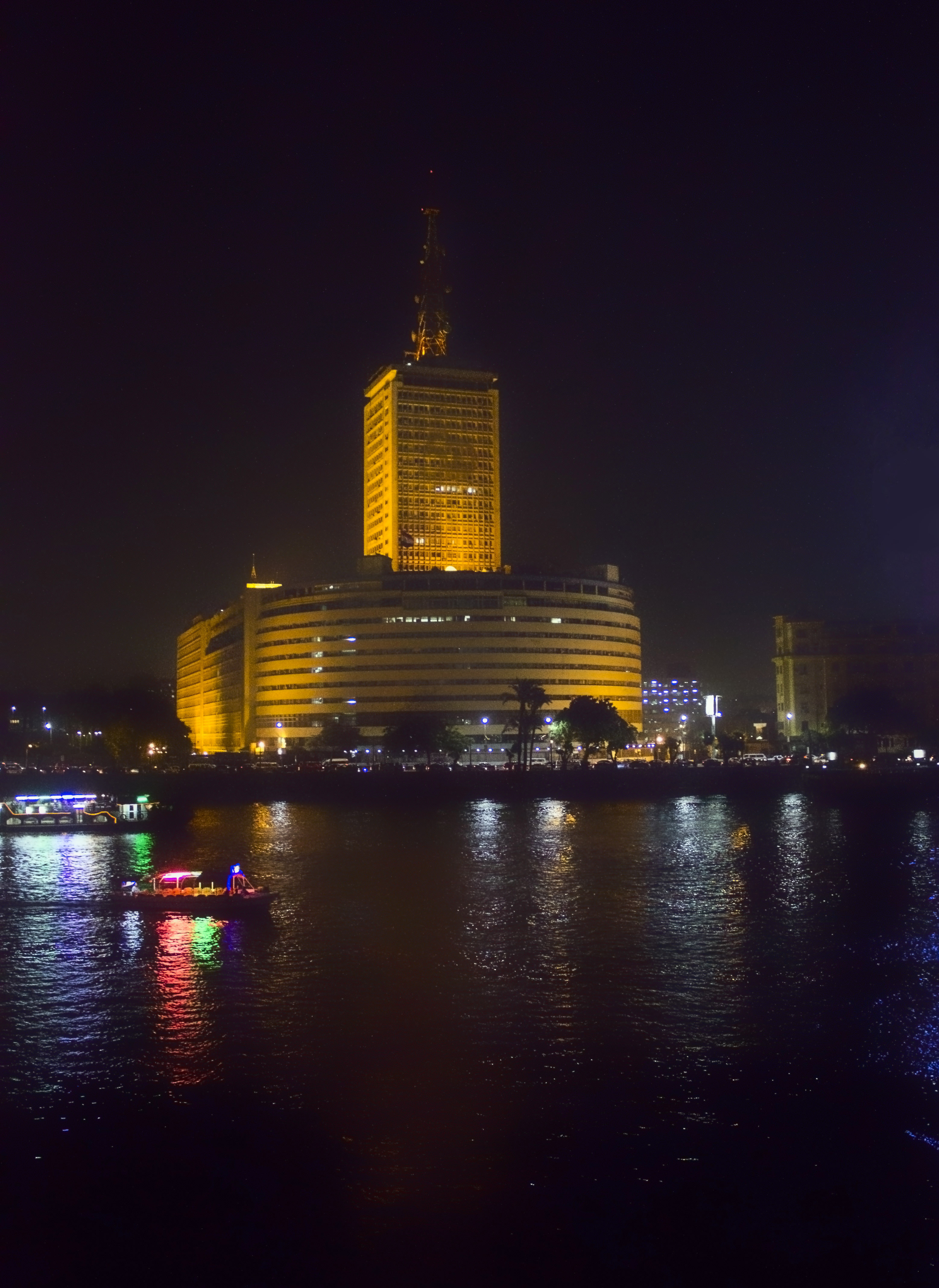
- Egyptian Television HQ on the Nile banks
- Type: Public sector
- Industry: Public service broadcasting
- Founded: 21 July 1960; 65 years ago in Cairo, Egypt
- Founder: Egyptian Government
- Headquarters: Cairo
- Products: Broadcasting • Web portals
- Owner: National Media Authority
- Subsidiaries: TV channels; Internet; Audiovisual production; Advertisement; Publishing and distribution; Others

The Egyptian Television Network is a television service run by the National Media Authority. It commenced programming on 21 July 1960. Nowadays it has more than fifteen national channels, and several broadcast channels on satellite.

== History ==
Though the decision to start television service was taken earlier by the late King Farouk, the British-French-Israeli Suez invasion delayed work until late 1959. Egypt then signed a contract with Radio Corporation of America to provide the country with a television network and the capacity to manufacture sets. Construction of the radio and television center was completed in 1960, and the first Egyptian television broadcast started on 21 July 1960.

Broadcast transmission began on 21 July 1960, at 07:00, the Egyptian TV was started with a five-hour-transmission. The transmission began with Qur'anic recitation followed by the opening of the parliament and a speech by President Gamal Abdel Nasser. This was followed by the national anthem, then the news bulletin and finally ended with Qur'anic recitation.

View of the Maspero television building, the headquarters of the Egyptian Television Network, Cairo in 1972

Broadcast began from Maspero television building whose transmission began in 1960. Ever since, the Egyptian television maintained its service of broadcasting through the different channels which serve different classes of the Egyptian society. The big building that takes its name after the French Egyptologist, Gaston Maspero, is deemed a distinguished site with its circular shape that receives over 30 thousand individuals daily. Egypt is the first country in the Middle East and Africa to provide TV broadcasting. On 13 August 1970 a new decree established the Egyptian Radio and Television Union (ERTU) and created four distinct sectors: Radio, Television, Engineering and Finance, each of which had a chairman who reported directly to the Minister of Information.

After the 1973 war, both television production and transmission facilities were upgraded to color transmission under the SECAM system. The Egyptian broadcasting changed from SECAM to PAL in 1992.

=== Transmission Hours ===
The Egyptian television began with a six-hour-broadcasting channel; however the broadcasting hours changed to 13 hours/day. Later, in 1961, a second channel was launched, and a third channel was launched in 1962. Thus, the total broadcasting hours of the three channels was 25–30 hours/day. The contents of the shows reflected people's interests at the time.

In the early 1980s, the Egyptian TV witnessed development in all domains and the orientation was to activate the media sovereignty principle through engineering and geographic expansion for a state-wide-coverage.

== Private channels ==
The first private Egyptian channel "Dream TV" was established on 2 November 2001. The channel is owned by the Egyptian businessman Ahmed Bahgat. In 2002, another channel "el-Mehwer TV" was established which is now owned by Dr. Hassan Rateb and the Egyptian radio and television union.

=== Egyptian private channels ===
1. Aghapy TV
2. Al Ahly TV
3. Al Hayah
4. Al Hayah Drama
5. Al Kahera wal Nas
6. Al Kahera wal Nas 2
7. Al Nahar TV
8. Al Nahar Drama
9. Al-Nas TV
10. Alexandria Channel
11. Al-Qahera News
12. Cairo Cinema
13. Cairo Drama
14. Cairo Comedy
15. Cairo Musalsalat
16. Cairo Film
17. Cairo Zaman
18. CBC
19. CBC Drama
20. CBC Sofra
21. Channel 1
22. Channel 2
23. CTV (Egyptian TV channel)
24. Delta Channel
25. DMC TV
26. DMC Drama
27. Egypt Holy Quran
28. Extra News
29. Extra Live
30. Mazzika
31. Mehwar TV
32. Modern Sports
33. ON E
34. ON Drama
35. ON Sport
36. ON Sport 2
37. Panorama Action
38. Panorama Comedy
39. Panorama Drama
40. Panorama Film
41. Sada El Balad
42. Sada El Balad Drama
43. Tanweer channel
44. TeN TV
45. Zamalek TV

== Criticism ==
Since its establishment, Egyptian television has always been regarded as the voice of Egyptian government and the ruling political party. Both the ERTU and the Television sector chairmen are appointed by the Minister of Information. Terrestrial channels, Egyptian satellite channel and specialized Nile channels are under direct government supervision, operation and ownership.

Private channels have a considerable freedom but with some limits. According to a study by the Cairo Institute for Human Rights (CIRS), during presidential elections both state-owned television channels and independent channels devoted more time to cover Mubarak's campaign than for the other nine candidates.

Another example for government intervention in private channels was banning the Egyptian famous journalist Mohamed Hassanein Heikal from appearing in Dream TV. Dream aired a lecture Heikal gave at the American University in Cairo in which he commented on speculation surrounding the bequeathing of the presidency in Egypt. This was the last time he appeared on Egyptian TV.

According to Reporters without borders 2005 report; Egyptian media ranks 143rd out of 167 countries in freedom of the press.

== See also ==
- List of television networks by country
- WATCH IT
- United Media Services
- National Media Authority
- Television in Egypt
