= EMPC =

EMPC may refer to:

- Egyptian Media Production City, an information and media complex located near Cairo, Egypt
- Estimated Maximum Possible Concentration, a term used in dioxin concentration determination for a concentration between limit of quantification and limit of detection
