= Egyptian Radio =

Pioneering Egyptian radio station

- Egypt

Programming
- Language: Arabic

Ownership
- Owner: ERTU
- Sister stations: Voice of the Arabs; Middle East Radio

History
- First air date: 31 May 1934

Egyptian Radio, also known as the Egyptian Radio's General Program (إذاعة البرنامج العام transliterated as Iza'et El-Bernameg Al-Aam) and popularly known as Radio Cairo (in Arabic إذاعة القاهرة transliterated as Iza'et el Qaahira), is the pioneering Egyptian radio station that started broadcasting on 31 May 1934 in agreement with the Marconi Company. The General Manager of the station for the period was Said Basha Lotfi who presided over the station from May 1934 to December 1947.

== Overview ==
In December 1947, the contract with Marconi was suspended in favour of an Egyptian national broadcasting station. The General Manager was replaced with Mohammed Beik Qasem presiding from December 1947 until August 1950.

The station is known also for its call "This is Cairo" (in Arabic هنا القاهرة pronounced Huna al Qaahira). It is considered the First Program (in Arabic البرنامج الأول) of the ERTU (Egyptian Radio and Television Union).

The station had some of the best known Arab broadcasters of their time, including Ahmed Said, Ahmed Salem, Mohammed Fathi, Mohammed Mahmoud Shaaban, Hosney Al-Hadidy, Galal Moawwad, Safiyya Al-Mohamdis and Taher Abu Zeid.

== Subsequent radio stations ==
Later on three main new radio channels were added: the Voice of the Arabs (صوت العرب) in 1953, the Second Programme (البرنامج الثاني) in 1957 and the pan-Arab Middle East Radio (إذاعة الشرق الأوسط) in 1964. All four stations broadcast on high powered medium wave transmitters covering most of the Middle East and North and East Africa.

Presently, ERTU, the Egyptian Radio and Television Union runs more than ten radio stations.

== See also ==
- List of radio stations in Egypt
