= Egyptian Satellite Channel =

The Egyptian Satellite Channel (الفضائية المصرية, ESC), also known as Al-Masreya, is the international channel of the National Media Authority. Founded on 12 December 1990, its goal is to provide programming to the Egyptian diaspora abroad, as well as bringing aspects of Egyptian culture to other Arab countries. Its programming comes from Channel 1, Channel 2 and the governorate channels.

== History ==
Plans had been enacted since 1989. Its role at the time of creation was to hasten Egypt's re-entry into the Arab League. Allocation on the satellite used began on 1 November 1990, test broadcasts started on 5 November; a few weeks later on 12 December, the channel started full-time broadcasting. Initially it broadcast on the Arabsat 1B satellite to northern and central Africa, the Middle East and Europe, with twelve Arab countries receiving its signal and installing receiving antennas to African states. It later moved to Arabsat 1C, then in 1996 to Arabsat 2. In 1992, it started broadcasting via the Eutelsat W2 satellite to better cover Europe, in late 1994 to the Atlantic area (Africa, Latin America and eastern North America) via Intelsat 707 (converted to digital in 1996, shut down analog in 1999), Alphastar in February 1996 to better cover North America, Asiasat-2 in early 1997 for the Asia-Pacific region and Nilesat 101 from 28 May 1998, which in Egypt is Media Professionals Day.

Initially, the channel was a partial mirror of Channel 1, replacing all breaks (advertisements and family planning PSAs) with music and footage of natural scenery. There was even a soap opera broadcast for one year during the channel's early years. Per a decision not to screen foreign content on the channel, Channel 1's programs that could not be seen due to rights issues were replaced by Channel 2 programs. The channel started with a 13-hour schedule, increasing to 19 in June 1993, while adding more programs from Channel 2 and even Channel 3. On 1 July 1994, the channel started 24-hour broadcasting. 95% of the output came from ERTU channels with the remaining 5% from other channels. One of its key selling points in the 1990s were its broadcast of Egyptian movies, mainly from the 1940s and 1950s. By contrast, the emerging pan-Arab satellite television landscape was frequently acquiring more recent titles from that country alone. The channel even made it to Showtime Arabia upon launch. ESC had gained a foothold in Saudi Arabia by early 1997, with some seeing it as an escape from officialist Saudi television; by then, the channel was carrying commercial advertising between programs. The channel was given approval by TARBS to carry it and the Nile Drama Channel on its subscription television service, TARBS World TV, in May 1999.

Luxlotusliner rebranded the channel in 2009 as part of a company-wide repositioning, the channel was represented by a blue, two-sided pyramid.
