= Nile News =

Egyptian news television channel

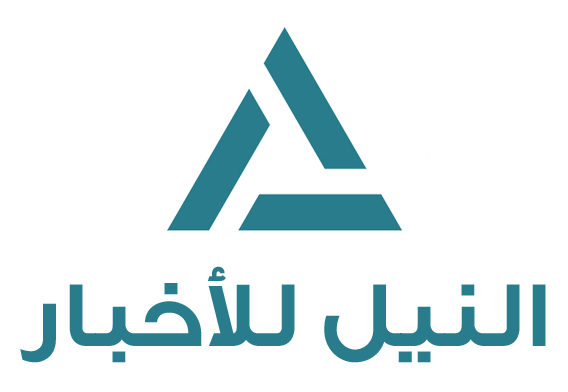
- Country: Egypt
- Broadcast area: Worldwide
- Network: ERTU
- Headquarters: EMPC, 6 October city, Egypt

Programming
- Language: Arabic
- Picture format: 1080p (HD)

History
- Launched: 6 October 1998; 27 years ago

Links
- Website: nile.eg

Nile News (Egyptian Arabic: النيل للأخبار) is an Egyptian state-funded Arabic-language news television network. Founded in 1998 as a 24-hour news network and headquartered in 6 October, Giza, Nile New was originally noted for its journalistic professionalism, which gained it popularity in the Arab world.

It is operated by the National Media Authority and is partly owned by the Egyptian Television Network.

== Overview ==
At launch in 1998, the channel used the Nilesat 101 satellite to deliver its signals, alongside the other specialized Nile-branded channels. The Egyptian government's ownership of the channel has resulted in it being subject to censorship. In 2018, Amira Salem became the channel's president; she succeeded Amr Al-Shennawi.

Nile News generally focuses on local and regional news, political analysis, and economic updates. Its coverage as of 2026 includes: extensive coverage of regional developments, such as; United Nations Security Council sessions and regional tensions. Key Programs include; Hatha Al-Sabah (This Morning), Nile Index, and Press Round (Gawlat al-Sahafa).

== See also ==
- List of world news channels
- List of Arabic-language television channels
- Television in Egypt
