= Kazeboon =

"Kazeboon" (also spelled "Kazabun"), which means "liars" in Arabic, is a public-awareness and alternative media campaign in Egypt critical of the Supreme Council of the Armed Forces (SCAF). The Egypt's Supreme Council of the Armed Forces (SCAF), overtook President Hosni Mubarak in 2011, and claimed to transfer power to a civilian administration.

Started in the late 2011, the campaign was launched by a group of young people in Egypt to circulate information about the military's “lies.” They used grassroots media tools, such as screening of videos, marches, and social media to make citizens aware of the criminal activity committed by the military.

The Kazeboon campaign consists of film screenings held in public spaces, characteristically done by projecting video clips against building walls. The video clips depict actions taken by Egyptian military personnel against civilians since SCAF took power in February 2011 following Hosni Mubarak's resignation in an effort to counter the narrative portrayed by state media.

The goal of Kazeboon is to “remove the military from power” and “get Tahrir Square out of Tahrir Square and into every neighbourhood."

Because the Kazeboon campaign has no dedicated coordinators or organizational hierarchy, it is hard to calculate how many screenings have taken place. According to the estimation of some Egyptian activists, dozens of Kazeboon screenings happen across the country every day.

== Origins ==
The Kazeboon movement started as a response to an incident that occurred on December 17, 2011, in Cairo. A young woman was attacked and dragged along the ground by Egyptian army soldiers, exposing her torso and bra. A picture of the attack appeared the next day on the front page of Tahrir newspaper, accompanied by the word "liars." The image was widely shared and became an important visual symbol of abuse of power by the Egyptian military, galvanizing activists that would constitute the organizers of the Kazeboon campaign.

To educate the public about this crime and others like it committed by Egyptian police, a film collective known as “Mosireen,” or “The Insistent,” collected hours of film and archived protest footage that they uploaded as videos to YouTube and distributed as DVDs to be played at Kazeboon screenings. The collective first started showing footage of protests on big screens in Tahrir Square in July 2011.

The campaign is also known as Askar Kazeboon, which translates to "the military are liars" or "the generals are liars."

The target audience of Kazeboon is not protesters and other activists, but people who outside of Egypt and those who support the government and state-run media. The campaign hopes "to reach the people who don't know, and are getting their information from SCAF-controlled state media."

== Screenings ==
=== 2011 ===
Kazeboon screenings began on December 29, 2011, taking place in public squares in El Mansheya, Alexandria and the Cairo districts of Zamalek, Maadi, Nasr City and Giza. Activists in El Mansheya and Zamalek met resistance from SCAF supporters and security forces. The screenings continued the following day in Cairo's Sayeda Zeinab district.

=== 2012 ===
The campaign quickly began to spread around Egypt in early January 2012, as rallies gained momentum in Dokki, Al-Matariyyah, Shubra and other districts within the first week of the new year, occasionally resulting in clashes with Mubarak supporters. On January 5, 2012, a screening held at Saad Zaghloul Square in Alexandria was preceded by a seminar where prominent activists provided context and shared personal accounts.

In the following weeks, the Kazeboon screenings continued around Egypt in anticipation of the anniversary of the January 25th protests in Tahrir Square. On January 26 and 27, 2012, activists projected Kazeboon videos on the facade of the state media headquarters in the Maspero television building to protest for media reform. 2013 Kazeboon in the name of religion (which refers to the Muslim Brotherhood, Salfist groups and any other political groups use region to reach their goals) now has been launched, and her is a Media Release. (Arabic version - English version)

== Complaints ==
The Kazeboon receives not only applause, but also complaints as well. Several screenings have been broken up with violence after locals objected to activists arriving on their doorsteps. According to an authorized news, In the upmarket Cairo district of Zamalek, which sits on an island in the middle of the Nile, organisers were accused of trying to "bring bloody Tahrir to our peaceful island."
