= Nile Radio Network =

Egyptian media company

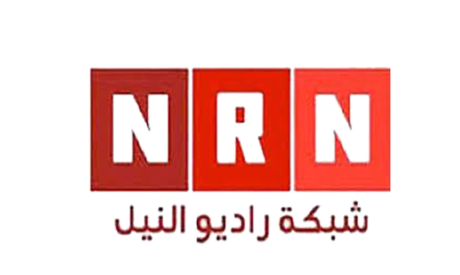
- Type: Media company
- Industry: Media
- Founded: 2015
- Founder: National Media Authority
- Headquarters: EMPC, 6th of October, Egypt
- Key people: Maher Abdel Aziz (Chairman)
- Products: Radio broadcasting
- Website: www.nilefm.com

Nile Radio Network (NRN) is an Egyptian media company that was founded in 2015 by the National Media Authority. The company is headquartered in Cairo and operates a variety of entertainment and non-entertainment radio stations. Maher Abdel Aziz serves as the company's chairman.

== Radio stations ==
=== Mega FM ===
Launched experimentally on July 24, 2010, on the frequency 92.7 FM, Mega FM is part of the Nile Radio Network, which was headed at the time by broadcaster Tarek Abou El Saoud.

=== Nagham FM ===
Nagham FM (Melody FM) is a popular Egyptian radio station broadcasting on 105.3 FM, offering a diverse range of programming that resonates with Egyptian listeners of all ages.

=== Shaabi FM ===
Shaabi FM (Folk FM) is an Egyptian radio station featuring the program “We Are the Joy,” aired every Thursday from 3:00 PM to 4:00 PM, showcasing a variety of celebratory songs. Additionally, it includes the “Duet Hour” segment, titled “Hour × 2,” which presents a collection of classic old songs by various artists, along with the “On the Title Track” segment.

=== Radio Hits ===
Radio Hits is dedicated to engaging young audiences, particularly teenagers, by broadcasting songs and content suitable for their age group.
