= Voice of the Arabs =

Egyptian transnational Arabic-language radio service

- Egypt
- Broadcast area: Middle East

Programming
- Language: Arabic

Ownership
- Owner: ERTU
- Sister stations: Egyptian Radio; Middle East Radio

History
- First air date: 1953; 73 years ago

Voice of the Arabs or Sawt al-Arab (Arabic: صوت العرب) (621 kHz on medium wave to Egypt, 9800 kHz, and many other frequencies on shortwave to the Middle East, the rest of Europe and North America) was one of the first and most prominent Egyptian transnational Arabic-language radio services.

Based in Cairo, the service became known to many Arabs and non-alike, as the main medium through which former Egyptian president Gamal Abdel Nasser spread his messages on Arab unity and revolutions across the Arab world. Despite its unmatched popularity in most of the 1950s and 1960s, the service no longer commands a large audience and does not play a significant role in domestic Egyptian or regional politics.

== History ==
=== Founding ===
Although disagreement exists about who initiated the service, most media observers recognize that Gamal Abdel Nasser, one of the coup leaders at the time and later President of Egypt, was the main driving force behind the project. According to Douglas Boyd, the idea of the service came from Mohammed Abdel-Kader Hatem, who would become Minister of Information. Until 1967, director and chief announcer Ahmed Said headed and managed the service.

Unlike the press, which the new government did not control until 1960, the radio fell under the monopoly of the government, who used this to their advantage. Recognizing the immense potential of radio, Nasser devoted "considerable financial resources to the expansion of public broadcasting." Voice of the Arabs first aired on 4 July 1953, one year after the 1952 Egyptian revolution, as a half-hour radio program on Cairo Radio. Quickly, the show developed into its own radio station broadcasting across the Arab world. A year after its initial broadcast, the service's transmission time tripled. By 1962, the service expanded to broadcasting 15 hours a day. This expansion made Egypt the "dominant broadcaster in the Middle East and a major international broadcaster" during the 1950s and 1960s. The following decade, the service had expanded to 24-hour-a-day broadcasting.

=== Under Nasser ===
Under Nasser's presidency and the leadership of Said, the revolutionary fervor of the coup leaders' ideology, the promotion of pan-Arabism, an anti-imperialist tone and the legendary voice of Egyptian singer Umm Kulthum characterized the service. Voice of the Arabs also called for the liberation of Palestine and galvanized Arabs in North Africa, Iraq and Yemen to rise up against colonial and monarchical rule. The station's tagline, which Ahmed Said claims to have written, was "Sawt al-Arab, calling to the Arab nation from the heart of Cairo" (صوت العرب ينادى أمة العرب من قلب القاهرة).

During what came to be known as the "Ahmed Said Era" (1953–1967), programming consisted of news, commentary on political topics, speeches by public officials including Nasser, talks by and interviews with various Arab political figures and dramas with political themes. The service also regularly featured nationalistic songs by popular musicians, like Abdel Wahab and Umm Kulthum, praising Nasser and his accomplishments and promoting pan-Arabism. The radio station used music not only as a propaganda tool but also to attract listeners to "serious programs schedule adjacent to the musical programs." Frequently, Nasser's speeches would be broadcast after a musical performance by Umm Kulthum.

While the audience for the service was broadly the whole Arab-speaking world, changing social and political conditions influenced programming and subjects for discussion. The service designed targeted programs for the Arab states of the Persian Gulf, Lebanon, Syria and Yemen.

==== Pan-Arabism ====
Voice of the Arabs functioned as Nasser's main vehicle in propagating his pan-Arabist views; it played a key role in propelling him to the leadership of the Arab nationalist movement. The service filled with declarations on Arab unity and statements that highlighted Egypt's and Nasser's roles as leaders of this movement. In 1954, it declared on air that "the Voice of the Arabs speaks for the Arabs, struggles for them and expresses their unity".

==== Anti-imperialism/anti-colonialism ====
The programming was also characterized by an anti-colonial tone and a rejection of Western imperialism. On one occasion, the service announced that Voice of the Arabs was "in the service of the Arab nation and its struggle against Western imperialism and its lackeys in the Arab world."

The first three years of its broadcasts focused on North African political struggles. The service supported the causes of French-exiled Sultan Mohammed V in Morocco and Habib Bourguiba's Neo Destour in Tunisia. As an expression of Nasser's anti-colonial stance, the service enabled and encouraged exiled Algerians to update Algerian followers on their activities. Voice of the Arabs supported Algerian revolutionaries not only by allowing them to use the services and facilities of the station but also by explicitly favoring the FLN's struggle against the French and broadcasting anti-French propaganda.

The service then turned its attention eastward; Iraq and Jordan became the next targets of Nasser's anti-colonial rhetoric and broadcasts. In an effort rid the Arab world of any Western influence, Voice of the Arabs launched a propaganda war against Iraq's then-Prime Minister Nuri as-Said, criticizing Iraq's participation in the Baghdad Pact. It also appealed directly to Jordanian citizens, calling them to campaign against Jordan's potential participation in the Baghdad Pact. This continued until the 1958 Iraqi Revolution overthrew the Iraqi monarchy, and Iraq subsequently withdrew its participation from the organization.

Voice of the Arabs widely broadcast Nasser's nationalization of the Suez Canal in 1956 and the removal of British forces from Egypt, contributing to the service's popularity and heightened concern among Western powers regarding the service. Combined with attacks on British and French allies in the region, these events led Britain and France to increase monitoring of Egyptian broadcasts. Violent and non-violent efforts to silence the radio failed and contributed to the radio's and Nasser's prestige and popularity.

From 1956 to the 1960s, Voice of the Arabs also gave expression to anti-British sentiments vis-à-vis its broadcast in North Yemen. The service provoked action against the British presence in Aden (Southern Yemen), a move countered by Saudi Arabian-supported pro-British radio broadcasts from Aden. Voice of the Arabs then took a more aggressive stance against Saudi Arabia.

Following the union with Syria in 1958 and the expansion of Egypt's transmitter power, the service also promoted liberation struggles in African countries south of the Sahara.

=== Decline in popularity ===
The station's popularity was tied to Nasser's accomplishments and successes as president and symbol of Arab unity. Therefore, the lack of spectacular success for Pan-Arabism and Nasser between 1958 and 1967 heavily contributed to gradual loss of credibility and fame of the station. Transmission of false reports during the Six-Day War consolidated its decline. From the start of the war, the Egyptian military relayed updates from front to the service, yet some reports had been false. Though Israel defeated Egyptian, Syrian and Jordanian forces on every front, Said reported great victories. Days after the war's start and Israeli forces had captured the Gaza Strip from the Egyptians, East Jerusalem and the West Bank from the Jordanians, and the Golan Heights from Syrians, the Voice continued to report an Arab victory. Other radio stations also broadcast Said's initial claims that Egypt was winning the war, contributing to the build-up of hope that victory was near. This made the eventual let down bigger and cost the station its credibility. Said was dismissed from his position, though Nasser had made the decisions behind the false broadcasting. The Voice of the Arabs and Said's handling later symbolized Egypt's self-deception, and the Voice of the Arabs station has not regained its former reach or impact.

== See also ==
- List of radio stations in Egypt
