= Thebes Channel =

Egyptian regional television channel

The Thebes Channel (Arabic: قناة طيبة), also known as Channel 8 (القناة الثامنة), is one of the six regional channels of the National Media Authority. The channel is based out of Aswan and targets the southern governorates: Suhag, Qena, Al Uqsur and Aswan.

== History ==
In 1995, work was underway for the establishment of the Aswan channel. Shebab Tageldin, who worked for Channel 5 Alexandria at the time, went to Aswan to provide technical training for its staff. The channel was in its testing phase in 1996, starting full-time broadcasts on 31 May that year. As of 2002, the channel broadcast for a daily average of 15 hours and 22 minutes, the least out of the six regional channels.

The channel caters mostly to the Arab population in the area. Airtime referring to Nubians is limited to brief segments in its programming, which is spoken in Arabic.

Photos of six former staff members were placed atop the elevator at its ground floor in 2021 on occasion of its 25th anniversary.
