= Style UK =

Style UK was a television channel carried on Showtime Arabia's satellite service for the Middle East, North Africa, and the Levant territories.

Similar to BBC Prime and Granada UKTV, it carried British entertainment programming from ITV, Channel 4 and the BBC, including Parkinson, The Bill, Father Ted and My Family.

On 1 April 2007, Showtime dropped the channel from their line-up and replaced it with a new channel called Series 2. Showtime stated that the new channel would be similar in content to UK Style.
