= Tharwat Bassily =

Egyptian businessman (1940–2017)

- ⲥⲉⲣⲟⲩⲁⲧ ⲃⲁⲥⲓⲗⲓ

Founder of CTV channel; Undersecretary of Holy Synod of the Coptic Orthodox Church

Personal details
- Born: 14 September 1940 Egypt
- Died: 5 December 2017 (aged 77) United States
- Citizenship: Egypt
- Education: Bachelor of Pharmacy, Cairo University (1967)

Tharwat Bassily (Coptic: ⲥⲉⲣⲟⲩⲁⲧ ⲃⲁⲥⲓⲗⲓ), (14 September 1940 – 5 December 2017) was an Egyptian businessman. Bassily graduated from the Faculty of Pharmacy, Cairo University in 1967. He was founder and chairman of the board of Amoun Pharmaceutical Company S.A.E., one of the leading private pharmaceutical companies in Egypt. Bassily was also the undersecretary of the Holy Synod of the Coptic Orthodox Church, a member of the Shura Council, and the founder of Coptic TV.
