= Wael el-Ebrashy =

Egyptian journalist and television host (1963–2022)

- وائل الإبراشي
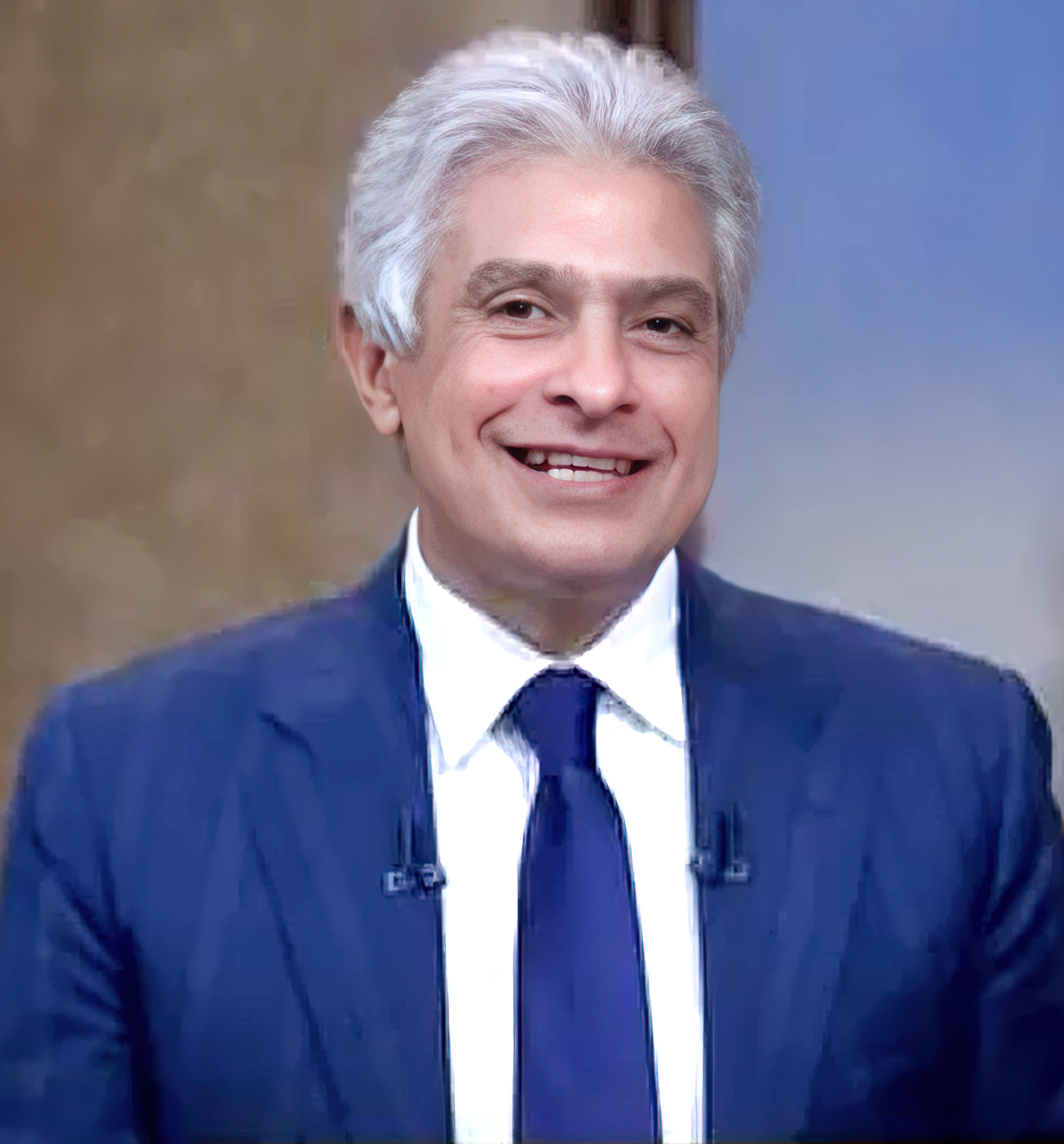
- Born: 26 October 1963; Sherbin, El Dakhlia, United Arab Republic
- Died: 9 January 2022 (aged 58); Cairo, Egypt
- Other names: Wael Elebrashy; Wāʾil al-Ibrāšī
- Occupations: Journalist and television presenter

Wael el-Ebrashy (Arabic: وائل الإبراشي; 26 October 1963 – 9 January 2022) was an Egyptian journalist and television presenter.

== Life and career ==
Born in Sherbin, el-Ebrashy started his career as a journalist in the magazine Rose al-Yūsuf, and later worked as editor-in-chief of the newspaper Sawt Al-Umma, from which he resigned in 2010.

He started his career as a television talk show host for the private TV stations Dream TV and ON TV, and later landed in the state television Channel 1, where he presented the popular talk show Al-Tesea ("“9 o'clock").

In December 2020, el-Ebrashy contracted COVID-19, which caused severe damage to his lungs; he was discharged from the hospital three months later but never fully recovered, and died on 9 January 2022, at the age of 58.
