= Upper Channel =

Egyptian regional television channel

The Upper Channel (Arabic: قناة الدلتا), also known as Channel 7 (القناة السابعة), is one of the six regional channels of the National Media Authority. The channel is based out of Minya and covers the Upper Egypt region: Minya, El-Fayoum, Beni Suef, and Asiut.

== History ==
The channel started test broadcasts in October 1993 and full-time broadcasting on 28 May 1994 (Media Professionals' Day), however some sources claim it opened on 29 July 1994. As of 2002, the channel broadcast for a daily average of 16 hours and 11 minutes. All female presenters as of 2015 wear hijabs.

Per an El Watan analysis in December 2015, the channel had some educational programs, which had been thought to have been disappeared from the national channels. The sample day showed that it was airing philosophy classes. Most of its programs were presented from the same set, with limited accessories (only one table and only one chair). Breaks featured public service announcements on birth control, as well as patriotic songs promoting Egyptian tourism.

== Criticism ==
Dozens of staff protested outside the ERTU Channel 7 building in Minya on 22 May 2013 against the nomination of Dr. Medhat Yefia as channel vice-president. Channel president Dr. Ahmed Hamada denied the demands of the staff and was preparing a special schedule for the upcoming 2013 Ramadan season.
