= Al-Qahera News =

Egyptian news television channel

Al-Qahera News القاهرة الإخبارية
- Type: Satellite television
- Country: Egypt
- Broadcast area: Worldwide (primarily Arab world)
- Headquarters: 6 October city, Egypt

Programming
- Language: Arabic
- Picture format: 1080p (HD)

Ownership
- Owner: United Media Services

History
- Launched: 31 October 2022; 3 years ago

Al-Qahera News is an Egyptian news channel owned and operated by United Media Services, and linked to the Egyptian state. Founded in 2022, the channel is officially described as the first pan-regional news channel in Egypt with emphasis on pan-Arabist perspectives. The channel employs correspondents in key Arab cities, Washington DC, Nairobi and several European cities.

== History ==
United Media Services announced the launch of the channel in May 2021; due to limited resources, the project was temporarily halted. In July 2022, work on the project resumed. In August, Al Dostor received the first pictures of the channel's facilities.

The channel was announced to the public on 17 October 2022, with its launch set to coincide with the United Nations Climate Conference in Sharm El-Sheikh in November. Ahead of launch, the channel was testing its broadcasts on the Nilesat satellite, joining new UMS channels (UMS Extra News and Extra Live, used for overflow coverage). The channel started broadcasting on 31 October.

Photo journalist Ahmed Fatima, who worked for the channel, died on 13 November 2023, during its coverage of the Gaza war. He died at the vicinity of the Al-Shifa Hospital, repeatedly targeted by Israel during the war.

In October 2024, it launched a sister project, Q News, in English. Available only online, the channel started with a four-hour schedule, increasing to eight to ten hours in a second phase, becoming a 24-hour channel in a third phase.

The channel is known for its retaliatory acts against hosts critical of the Egyptian government.

== See also ==
- Television in Egypt
