= Middle East Radio =

International broadcasting service of Egypt

- Type: Radio network
- Country: Egypt

Ownership
- Owner: National Media Authority

History
- Launch date: 1964; 62 years ago

Coverage
- Availability: International

Middle East Radio (Egyptian Arabic: إذاعة الشرق الأوسط, romanized: Iza'at al Sharq al Awsat) is an Egyptian pan-Arab commercial radio station established in 1964 by the Egyptian Radio and Television Union (ERTU) owned by the Egyptian government. The station provides a variety of spoken content (talk shows and news briefs) and songs.

Established as a pan-Arab station, it has a significant historical presence. As a result of the continuous development processes that Middle East Radio has witnessed since its establishment, it has been able to increase advertising revenue.

== Overview ==
It started broadcasting on 30 May 1964 distinguishing itself from its main pan-Arab rival Voice of the Arabs (إذاعة صوت العرب transliterated as Sawt al-Arab) with more popular programming as opposed to its rival's more dogmatic and propagandist content. The station ran at times ads targeting the Middle East and North Africa through its powerful medium wave broadcasting facilities.

The broadcasts were extended to reach 24 hours per day in 1996 (Ramadan 1416 Hijri).

The station has progressed into a major local Egyptian network broadcasting within Egypt on 89.5 FM in Greater Cairo with rebroadcasts on 96.3 FM in El Mahalla El Kubra and on NileSat 11766H

== See also ==
- List of radio stations in Egypt
