= Ahmed Said (broadcaster) =

Egyptian radio broadcaster (1925–2018)

- أحمد سعيد
- Born: 29 August 1925; Cairo, Egypt
- Died: 4 June 2018 (aged 92); Cairo, Egypt
- Occupations: broadcaster, journalist
- Employer: Voice of the Arabs
- Organization: 1953–1967

Ahmed Said (Arabic: أحمد سعيد; 29 August 1925 – 4 June 2018) was an Egyptian radio broadcaster. He was the first director and main announcer for Sawt al-Arab from its founding in 1953 until 1967. He was known for calling for Arab unity and the liberation of Palestine from “the sea to the (Jordan) river” and claims to have written the station's famous tag line of "Sawt al-Arab, calling to the Arab nation from the heart of Cairo." He died on 4 June 2018, aged 92.
