= Maspero Television Building =

Skyscraper in Cairo, Egypt

- مبنى ماسبيرو للتلفزيون
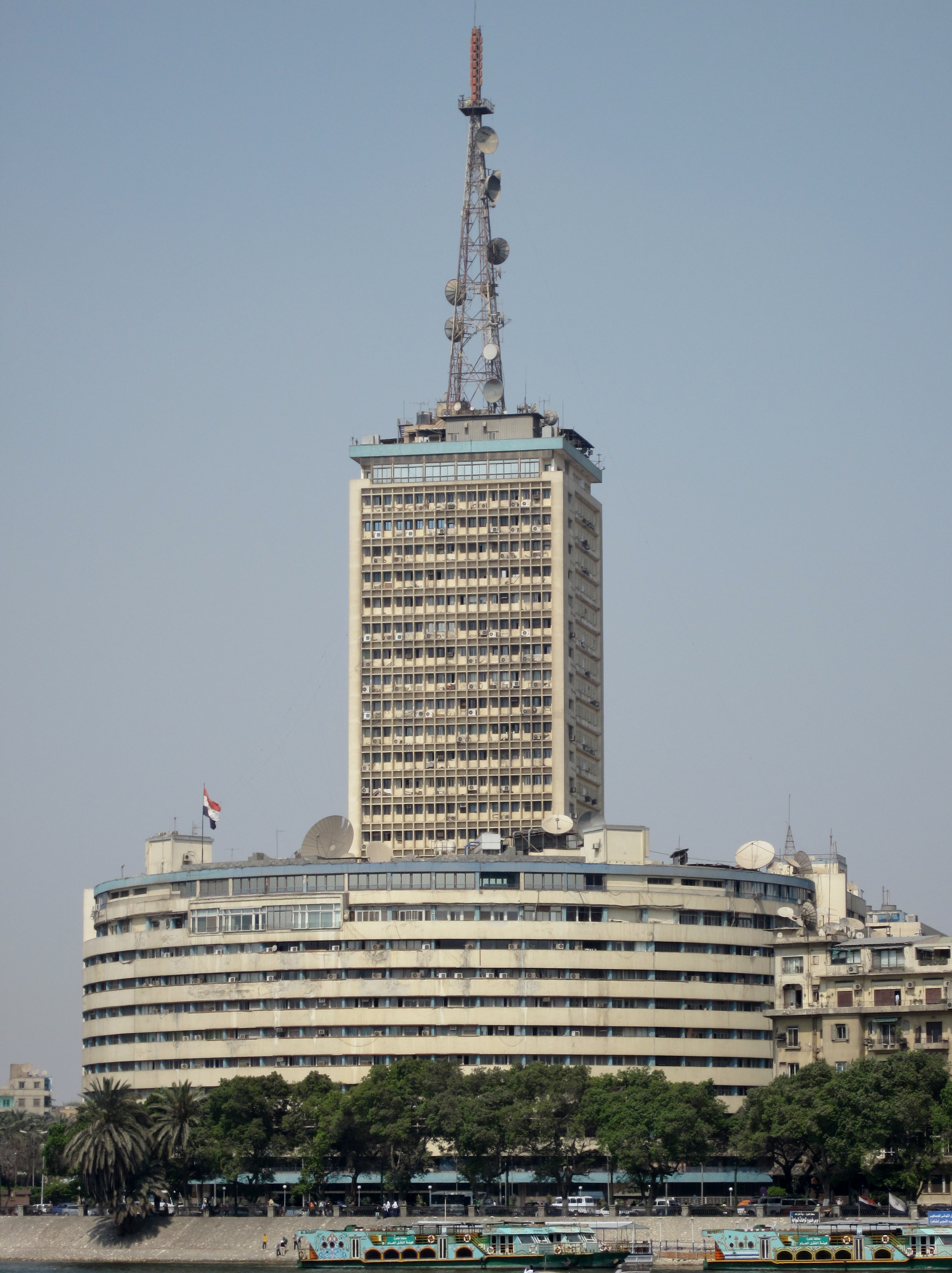
- Maspero Television Building in 2009

General information
- Status: Completed
- Location: Cairo, Egypt
- Coordinates: 30°03′12.0″N 31°13′51.0″E
- Construction started: August 1959
- Completed: 1960
- Opening: July 21, 1960

Height
- Roof: 100 m (328 ft)

Technical details
- Floor count: 30
- Floor area: 12,000 m^{2} (129,167 sq ft)

Design and construction
- Architect: Galal Momen

Maspero Television Building (Arabic: مبنى ماسبيرو للتلفزيون) is a skyscraper in Cairo, Egypt. Standing at a height of 100 m (328 ft) with 30 floors, it serves as the headquarters of the National Media Authority, which is the state television broadcaster for Egypt. The skyscraper is situated on the bank of the Nile River in Cairo.

== History ==
In August 1959, President Gamal Abdel Nasser ordered the construction of the skyscraper. The first broadcast from Maspero commenced on July 21, 1960, coinciding with the country's introduction of television on the eighth anniversary of the Egyptian Revolution of 1952. The building was built on an area of 12,000 square meters with a budget of E£108,000. It was named after the French archaeologist Gaston Maspero, who served as the chairman of the Egyptian Antiquities Authority in the late 19th century.

In October 2011, the Egyptian Army and state security forces killed 26 people, of whom at least 21 were Copts, during demonstrations outside of the building.

== Gallery ==
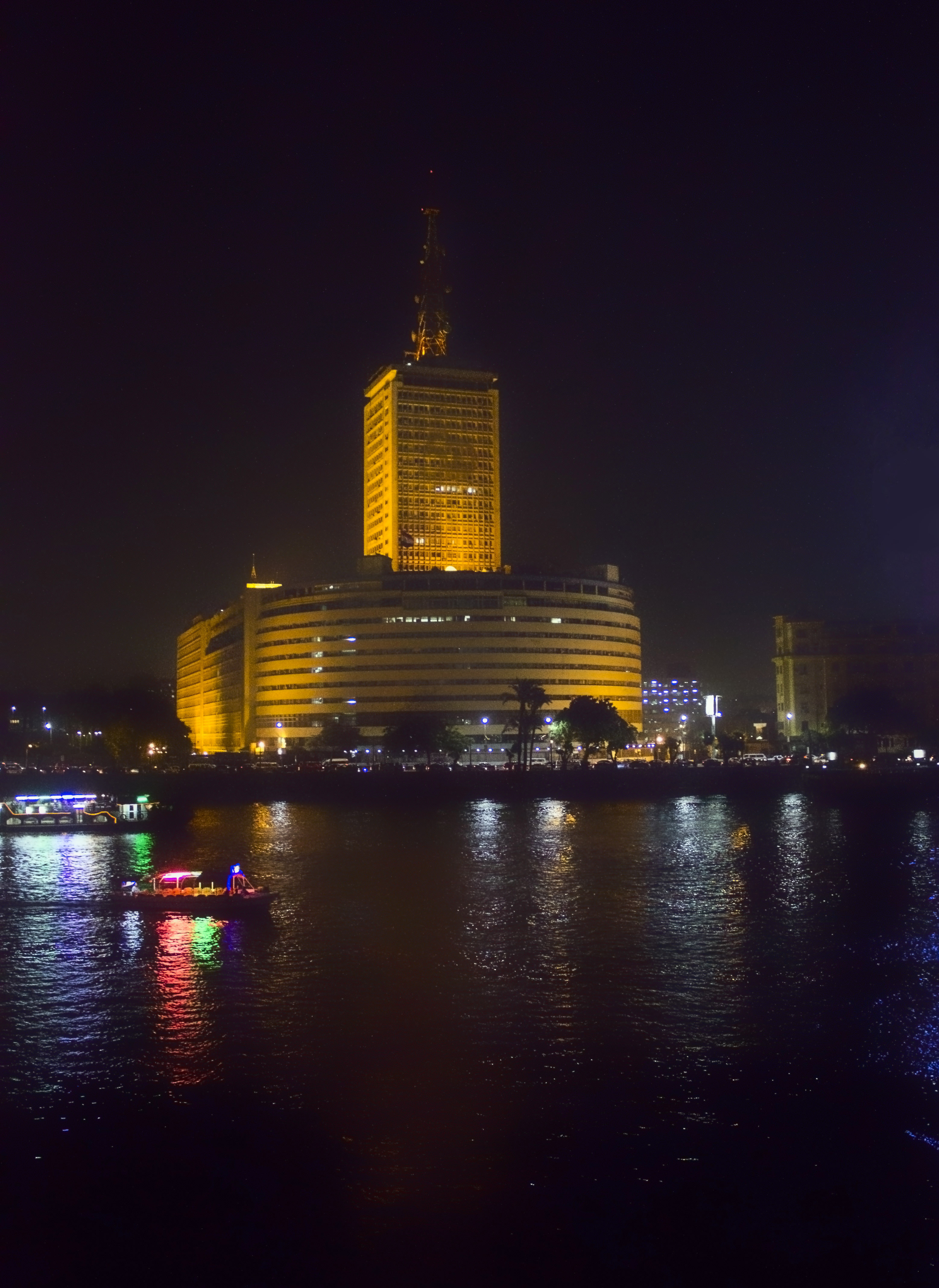
Maspero Television Building at night

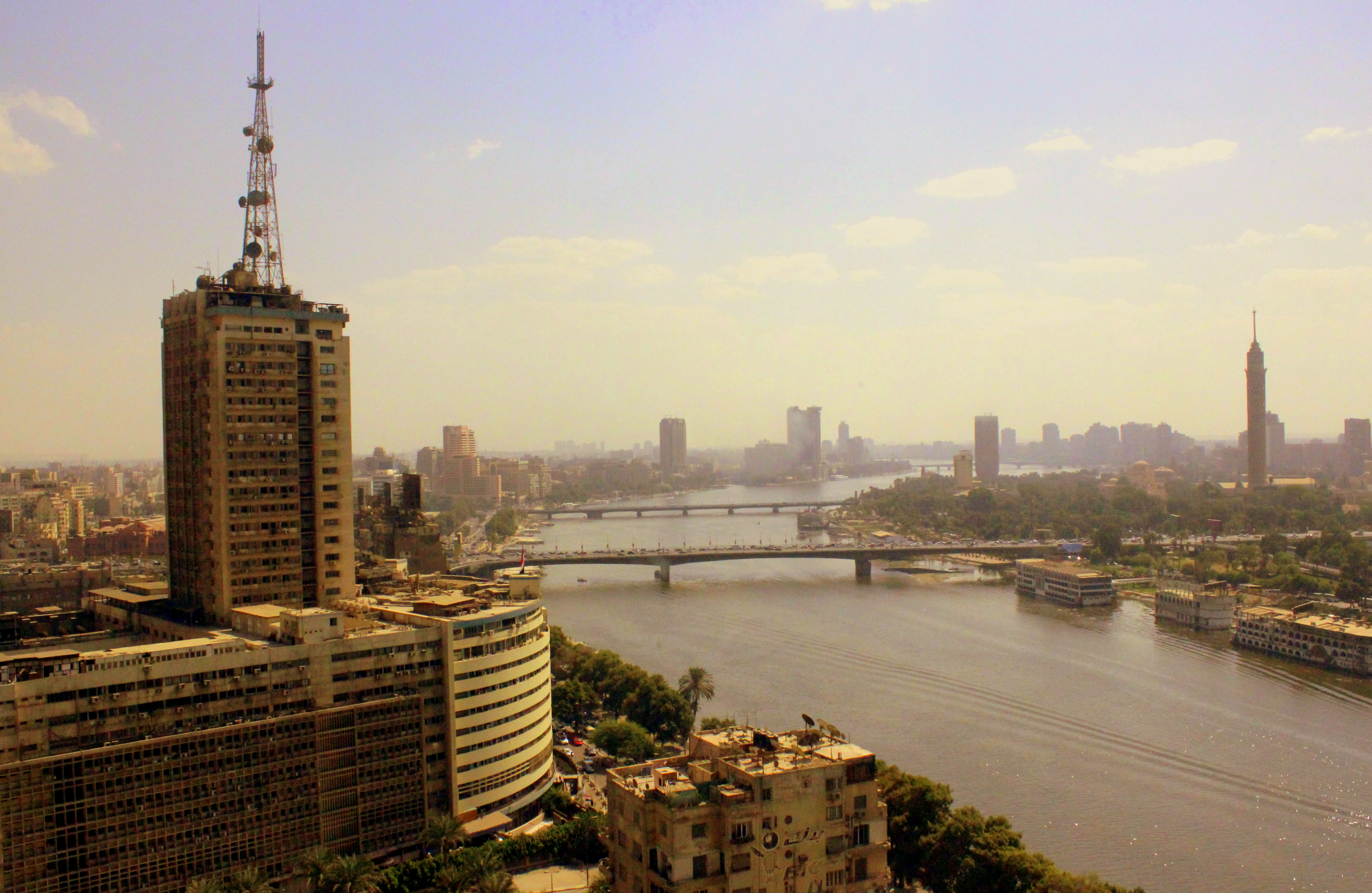
Maspero television building facing the Nile River

Maspero television building and the Ministry Of Foreign Affairs.

== See also ==
- List of tallest buildings and structures in Egypt
- National Media Authority
- Television in Egypt
