= Television in Egypt =

Television in Egypt is mainly received through free satellite, while analog terrestrial represents 41% of total viewers. The Central Agency for Public Mobilization and Statistics said the average time an Egyptian spends watching television a day is 180 minutes (3 hours), while Egyptian channels recorded 170,000 hours of broadcast in 2019.

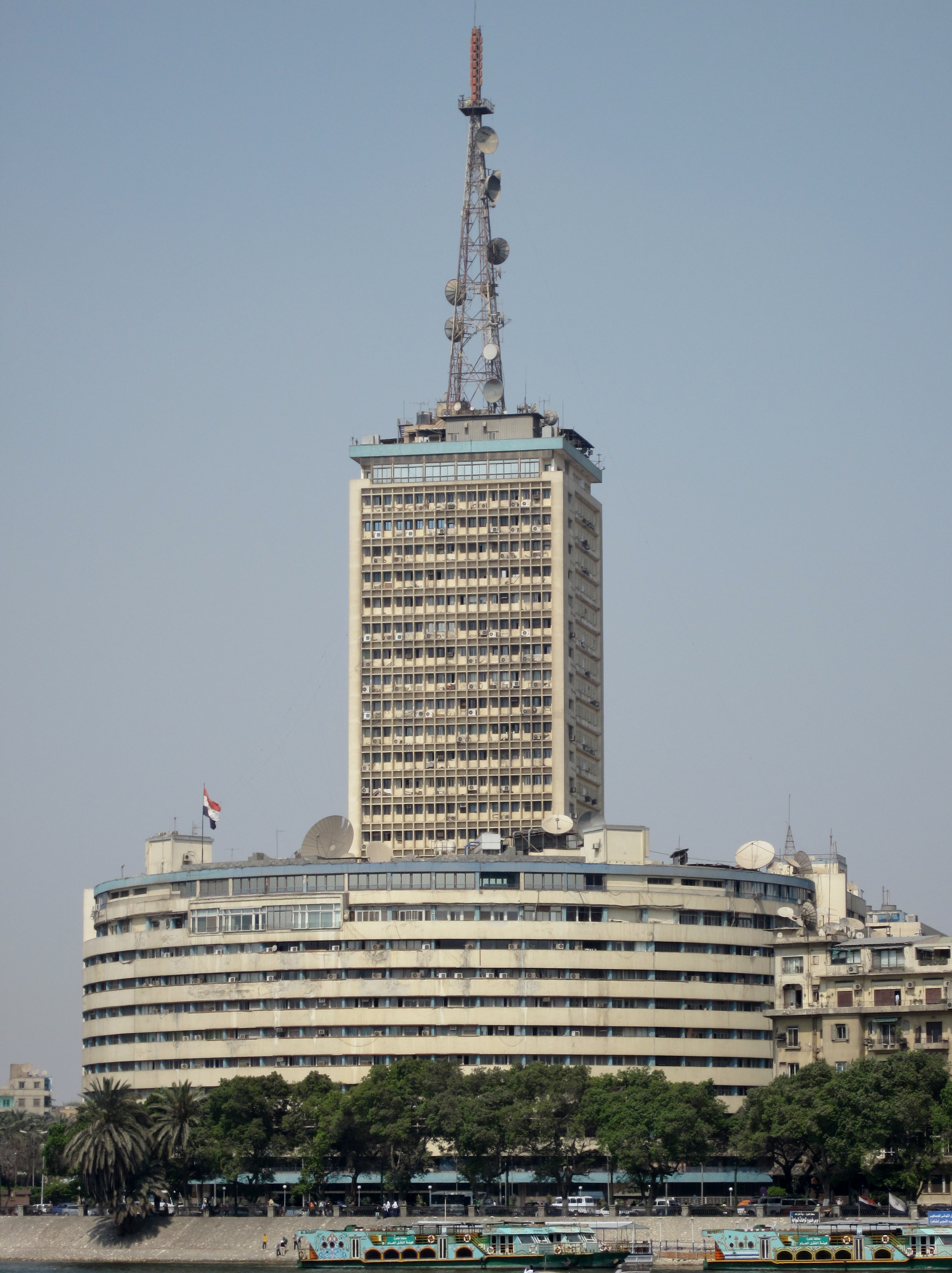
Egyptian Television headquarters on the Nile banks, Cairo

Since Egypt launched its first broadcasts in 1960, state-run channels have held a monopoly on terrestrial broadcast. The industry benefited from Cairo's longstanding role as the Arab world's center of art and film. By the early 1970s Egypt was exporting programs throughout the region, although Saudi Arabia refused to buy productions because of fear of Egyptian propaganda. Only 600,000 television sets existed for 34 million Egyptians, however, and only one third of villages had electricity.

The Ministry of Information strictly regulated private satellite channels as well. The Egyptian Radio and Television Union, a government entity, owns all 17 terrestrial channels. Channel 1 and Channel 2 are the network’s main channels and broadcast across Egypt. The state-owned Nile TV is the main foreign language channel, aims at promoting Egypt's state point of view and promote tourism. There are 6 regional terrestrial channels, which used to all be broadcast to Greater Cairo, but as of 2007, only Greater Cairo channel (Channel 3) of the regional channels is broadcast to Greater Cairo. Most terrestrial channels were in fact satellite channels owned by ERTU, but simulcasted to Greater Cairo, since 2007.

The state's 23 channels are reported to have, as of 2012, "a small and dwindling viewership".

There are also many private satellite stations. As of 2002, there used to be only two, Al-Mehwar and Dream, though the government has a financial stake in both channels. Since the 2011 revolution, more channels have launched, including Capital Broadcasting Center, Al Nahar and Al Tahrir (now TeN), which have managed to attract significant viewership. Rotana launched Rotana Masriya, a channel broadcasting programs aimed at the Egyptian market.

Subscription television penetration is low, estimated to be 9% in 2011, which consists of OSN and Arab Radio and Television Network. OSN was formed in 2009 by merging Orbit and Showtime Arabia. All of which are not owned by Egyptian companies, but by Persian Gulf companies.

In the 1990s, there used to be an Egyptian company called CNE (Cable Network of Egypt) which provided a few foreign pay TV stations broadcast terrestrially over the air (CNN International, MTV Europe with one show made for Arab League viewers, and other defunct channels), but needed a special receiver and a card.

The overwhelming number of private satellite stations launched during 2008 until 2012 has changed the Egyptian TV production market drastically, lifting the dominant hand of state-run channels off the market. Over 50 TV series have been broadcast annually during Ramadan – Main TV viewership season. Introduction of dubbed TV shows – from Turkey and India mainly- on Egyptian TV channels made the market more competitive. Egyptian TV productions companies started to adapt in efforts to match the foreign offerings which started to dominate the market. Companies like Egyptian Arts Group, El Adl Group and many others started doubling their annual production budgets in efforts to match the foreign TV series offerings in terms of quality of production.

== Most viewed channels ==
| Position | Channel | Share of total viewing (%) |
|---|---|---|
| 1 | MBC Masr | 8.4 |
| 2 | Dream 1 | 7.7 |
| 3 | Mehwar TV | 7.1 |
| 4 | MBC 1 | 6.7 |
| 5 | CBC | 6.1 |
| 6 | Al-Nahar | 5.7 |
| 7 | On E | 4.3 |
| 8 | OSN | 3.8 |
| 9 | Rotana Drama | 3.4 |
| 10 | Al Hayat TV | 3.1 |
| 11 | TeN TV | 2.7 |
| 12 | MBC Drama | 2.2 |
| 13 | DMC | 1.7 |
| 14 | ERTU 1 | 1.4 |
| 15 | ART | 1.1 |
| 16 | Nile TV | 0.6 |

== On-demand television ==
In 2012, Core Republic started the first online Television in Egypt named El Gomhoreya TV which an on-demand service online. It was later renamed to ELGTV before becoming a YouTube channel with a separate website called the Glocal.

== See also ==
- Arab television drama
- Mass media in Egypt
- List of newspapers in Egypt
- List of magazines in Egypt
- List of radio stations in Egypt
- Telecommunications in Egypt
