= Estimated maximum possible concentration =

Scientific phenomenon

Estimated maximum possible concentration (EMPC) is a term used in dioxin concentration determination for a concentration between limit of quantification and limit of detection.
