= PMC (TV channel) =

- Broadcast area: Europe, Middle East, Central Asia and Northern Africa
- Headquarters: Dubai Media City, Dubai, United Arab Emirates

Programming
- Language(s): Persian, English
- Picture format: 16:9 (720p, HDTV), 16:9 (576i, SDTV)

Ownership
- Owner: Mehrdad Kia

History
- Launched: May 9, 2003; 22 years ago

Links
- Website: http://www.pmc.tv

PMC (shortened from Persian Media Corporation or Persian Music Channel or Persian Media Channel ) is a free-to-air satellite TV network owned by Persian Media Corporation with its headquarters in Luzern, Switzerland (formerly in Dubai Media City). It was launched in 2003. The network is devoted to Persian music videos from ex-pat Iranian singers, as well as Iranian singers based in Iran.

Arabic, Kurdish and Turkish hit songs are also shown on the network.

The channel is also widely viewed in Iran, Europe, Middle East, Central Asia and Northern Africa via free-to-air satellite.

In March 2017 the broadcasting via Hotbird was discontinued. In April 2017 PMC started a new broadcasting frequency via Astra. In December 2017 the channel returned to Hotbird. After the channel was only available on Yahsat for a while, it changed to Hotbird, Eutelsat 7A and Eutelsat 7B.
