= DMTV =

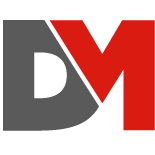
- Country: UAE
- Headquarters: Dubai, United Arab Emirates

Programming
- Language(s): Arabic

History
- Launched: August 1, 2006; 19 years ago
- Closed: March 30, 2015

Links
- Website: "www.dm-tv.tv". Archived from the original on 2015-03-31.

DMTV (Decision Makers TV قناة الرجل المتميز) was an Arabic TV channel located in Dubai Media City, United Arab Emirates. It was launched by the National Broadcast Center on August 1, 2006, and ceased operations on March 30, 2015.

== History ==
DMTV provided lifestyle advice for Arab men and covered topics such as global economics, business, and enterprise. It was available on Nilesat 102, Du (Channel 206), E-Vision (Channel 156), and OSN (Channel 745). In 2013, the Lebanese show Min Al Akher started airing on DMTV. The channel ceased operations unexpectedly on March 30, 2015.

== See also ==
- Dubai Media City
