= Aghapy TV =

Coptic Christian TV channel

AghapyTV
- Country: Egypt

Ownership
- Owner: Coptic Orthodox Church of Alexandria

History
- Launched: 2005

Links
- Webcast: www.aghapytvlive.com
- Website: www.aghapy.tv

Availability

Streaming media
- Sling TV: Internet Protocol television

Aghapy TV is a Coptic Christian TV station broadcasting in Arabic via satellite to Coptic Christians in Egypt and in North America via Spiritcastsatellite systems.

Aghapy is the Greek & Coptic word Agape, which means love or sometimes equal to "unconditional love".

It was founded in 2005 by the Coptic Orthodox Church of Alexandria.

Aghapy TV headquarters are located in Cairo, Egypt. Aghapy TV founded by Fr. Bishoy Elantony under the supervision of Bishop Botros. Aghapy TV started broadcasting into N. America via 97 degree Galaxy West satellite. Soon afterwards, it was available on the Galaxy 25 Satellite System along with CTV (Coptic TV). However, while CTV is still on air via Galaxy Satellite, the Galaxy service for Aghapy TV was eventually discontinued in North America, having been replaced by Dish Network 775 in April 2009. In terms of free-to-air satellite, Aghapy TV is available in Australia and New Zealand via Optus D2 and elsewhere on Telstar 12 (except North America). Aghapy TV also broadcasts on various digital channels in Asia, Africa, Australia and New Zealand via UBI World TV along with CTV.
