= Canal Channel =

Egyptian regional television channel

The Canal Channel (Arabic: قناة القنال), also known as Channel 4 (القناة الثالثة), is one of the six regional channels of the National Media Authority. The channel is based out of Ismailia and concentrates its coverage on the governorates along the Suez Canal region, covering Alexandria, Al Buhayrah, South Sinai, and parts of Matrouh.

== History ==
The channel started broadcasting on 4 October 1988. As of 2002, the channel broadcast for a daily average of 18 hours and 57 minutes.

The channel's 2015 Ramadan season included repeats of old Egyptian series during fasting time. In October 2015, the channel was reported to air Nations of Morale, an Islamic program presented by Hesham Abdel Aziz. The main program was reportedly Sabah Al-Mahrousa, which was created for the six regional stations. Analysis of one edition in that month showed that the first segment was a look at Egyptian newspapers, while the second segment on that day was dedicated to children with autism and how to treat it. It also aired Egyptian TV series and educational programs, and being the anniversary of the 1973 war, commercial breaks were filled with songs and celebratory messages of the Egyptian victory.

The channel has two flagship evening programs. Free Zone (منطقة حرة) is a nightly talk show. There is also The Canal Today (القنال اليوم). Both programs are easily adaptable for national patriotic holidays, showing special editions on these occasions. Year-end editions of these and other programs are highlights of the entire year.

== Controversies ==
In January 2018, Maha Hassan, presenter of I Miss You Songs (أغاني وحشاني), a program dedicated to old Egyptian music, was criticized on social media for the revealing clothes she wore, as well as for her shirt carrying words in English, violating ERTU/NMA presentation standards. Her colleagues denounced her stylist, Naila Farouk.
