= Dream TV (Egypt) =

Arabic-language satellite television channel

- Type: Satellite television network
- Country: Egypt
- Headquarters: Egyptian Media Production City, Egypt

Programming
- Picture format: 576i (SDTV)

Ownership
- Owner: Ahmed Bahgat
- Sister channels: Dream 2 Dream 2+ Dream 3 Dream 4 Dream Aisslam (Concept); Dream Aflam (Concept); Dream Kids (Concept); Dream Drama; Dream FM (Egypt)

History
- Launched: 2 November 2001; 24 years ago
- Closed: July 2021; 5 years ago

Dream TV (Arabic: قناة دريم) is an Egyptian satellite television channel headquartered in Media Production City, Egypt. Dream TV was the first Egyptian private television channel, and offered two channels on Nilesat: Dream 1 and Dream 2, until 2015. The network provides cultural programming, news analysis, and a platform for talk shows - most notably "10:00 pm" (Arabic: العاشرة مساءً) with Mona el-Shazly on Dream 2.

== History ==
Dream TV was launched by business magnate Ahmad Bahgat in 2001. It was the first satellite channel to respond to the government of Egypt's limited opening of private satellite channels from a designated media 'free zone' in Media Production City (EMPC), which is a media and information complex near Cairo, Egypt. In 2000, the Egyptian government made the decision to allow private Egyptian-owned satellite broadcasters to start transmitting - with certain restrictions - from EMPC. Those businessmen with close relations to President Hosni Mubarak benefited most, and Ahmad Bahgat, head of the Bahgat group and owner of Dreamland leisure and residential complex near Cairo, took the initiative by being the first to sponsor and launch Dream TV on 2 November 2001.

Bahgat accepted part ownership of Dream TV by the Egyptian Radio and Television Union (ERTU). The ERTU is also the main shareholder of Egyptian Media Production City and Nilesat, which are both essential to private broadcasters' operations. As a result, there were limitations put on Dream TV's programming by ERTU. For example, as the ERTU already possessed its own Egyptian news networks, it had no interest in promoting news competition on Dream TV. Additionally, companies that operate within the EMPC are subject to intervention by the Public Authority for Investment and Free Zones, which has authority to suspend licenses.

== Political Content ==
A dilemma for Dream was finding a balance between attracting viewers with compelling programming and not provoking authorities to suspend their broadcasting license. Vaguely worded prohibitions on criticizing those in power were a threat to Dream TV's broadcasting discretion. Moreover, Egypt's emergency law grants the Egyptian government carte blanche to take action against political criticism. Since its launch, Dream TV has received repeated warnings for its political content.

The Egyptian free-zone authority warned Dream TV in 2002 that was at risk of losing its license after a week of programming that was deemed sexually explicit and critical of local politics. Although the sexual content was cited as the official reason for the warning, many suspected that political commentary was the real cause.

In 2005, Wael el-Ebrashy, a Dream TV presenter and journalist on Sawt al-Umma, was one of three journalists put on trial for publishing the initials of judges accused of condoning electoral fraud while overseeing parliamentary elections. Ibrahim Eissa, host of Aala al-Qahwa on Dream TV and also editor of Al-Destour and Sawt al-Umma, was dropped in 2003 from the network as a condition of the prime minister for Ahmad Bahgat debt rescheduling to state-owned banks. In June 2006, Eissa was one of two people on Al-Destour to be sentenced to one year in prison after reporting a legal case that had accused President Mubarak of misusing public money in the privatization of public companies. Ibrahim Eissa's contract with Dream TV guaranteed that he would be allowed to express himself freely and use his program to 'present what people are feeling.'

== Role in 2011 Egyptian Revolution ==
On 7 February 2011, following 11 days of detention by Egyptian authorities, Google executive and political activist Wael Ghonim was interviewed by Dream TV's "10:00pm" host Mona el-Shazly. During the interview, an emotional Ghonim praised and mourned protesters who had died demonstrating across Egypt. When el-Shazly began a segment narrating pictures of those killed, Ghonim began to weep uncontrollably. “They went out only for the sake of Egypt,” said el-Shazly. “They said what the previous generations couldn’t do, we can do.” Ghonim rose up from the table in the studio and walked off camera while Ms. Shazly took out her earpiece and followed him. Ghonim immediately went to Midan Tahrir in downtown Cairo to address the protesters, which in hindsight was one of many seminal moments of the Egyptian Revolution.
