= Capital Broadcasting Center =

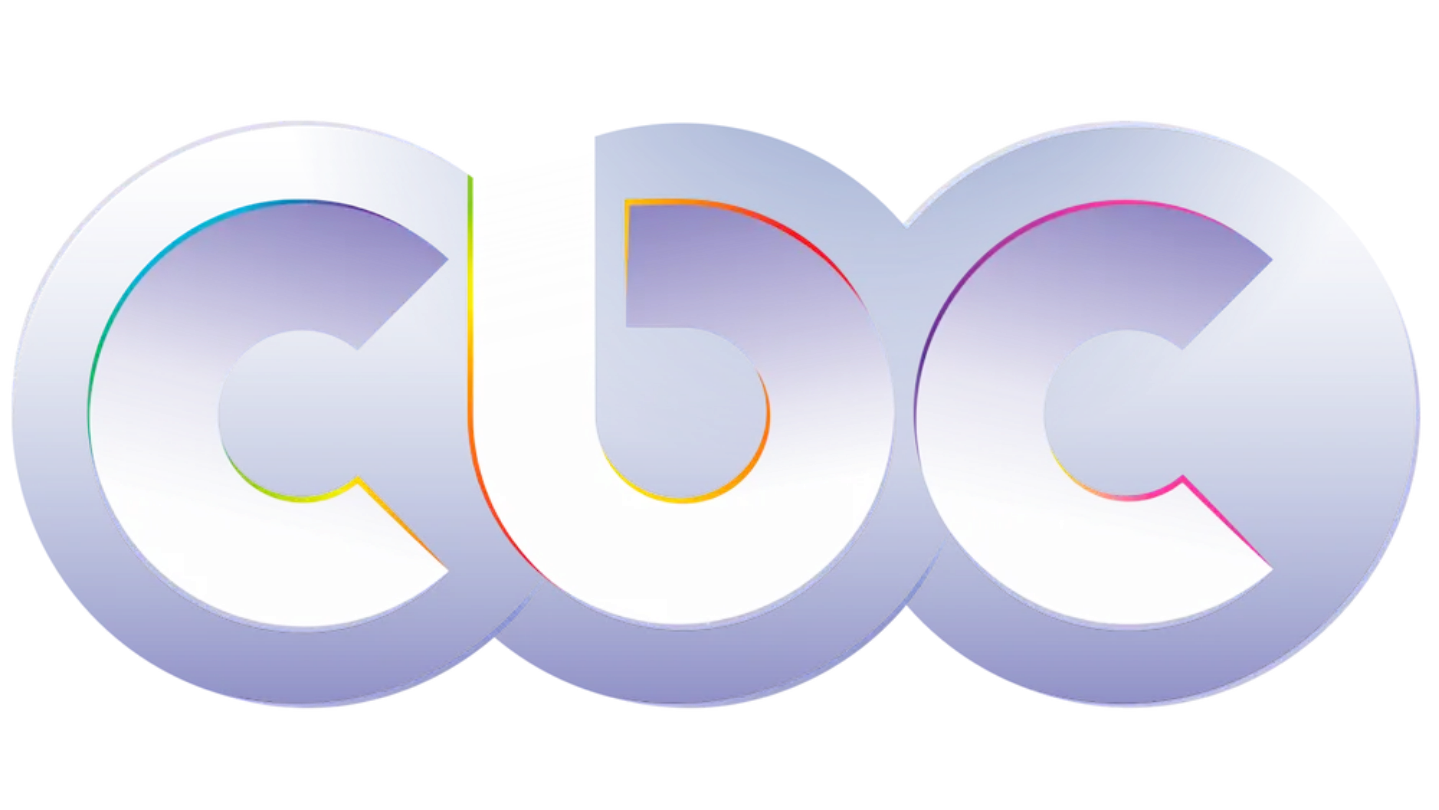
- Country: Egypt
- Broadcast area: Middle East

Programming
- Language: Arabic

Ownership
- Owner: United Media Services (UMS)
- Sister channels: CBC Drama; CBC Sofra; Extra News; Extra Live

History
- Launched: 2 July 2011; 14 years ago

The Capital Broadcasting Center (Arabic: مركز تلفزيون العاصمة) (CBC (Arabic: سي بي سي)) is a satellite television network in Egypt that began in July 2011. It is owned by the United Media Services (UMS), a company owned by the Egyptian General Intelligence Service (GIS).

It broadcasts entertainment, drama and general political programmes. CBC has been accused of pro-government bias.

== See also ==
- Television in Egypt
