= National Media Authority =

Egyptian government agency

National Media Authority الهيئة الوطنية للإعلام
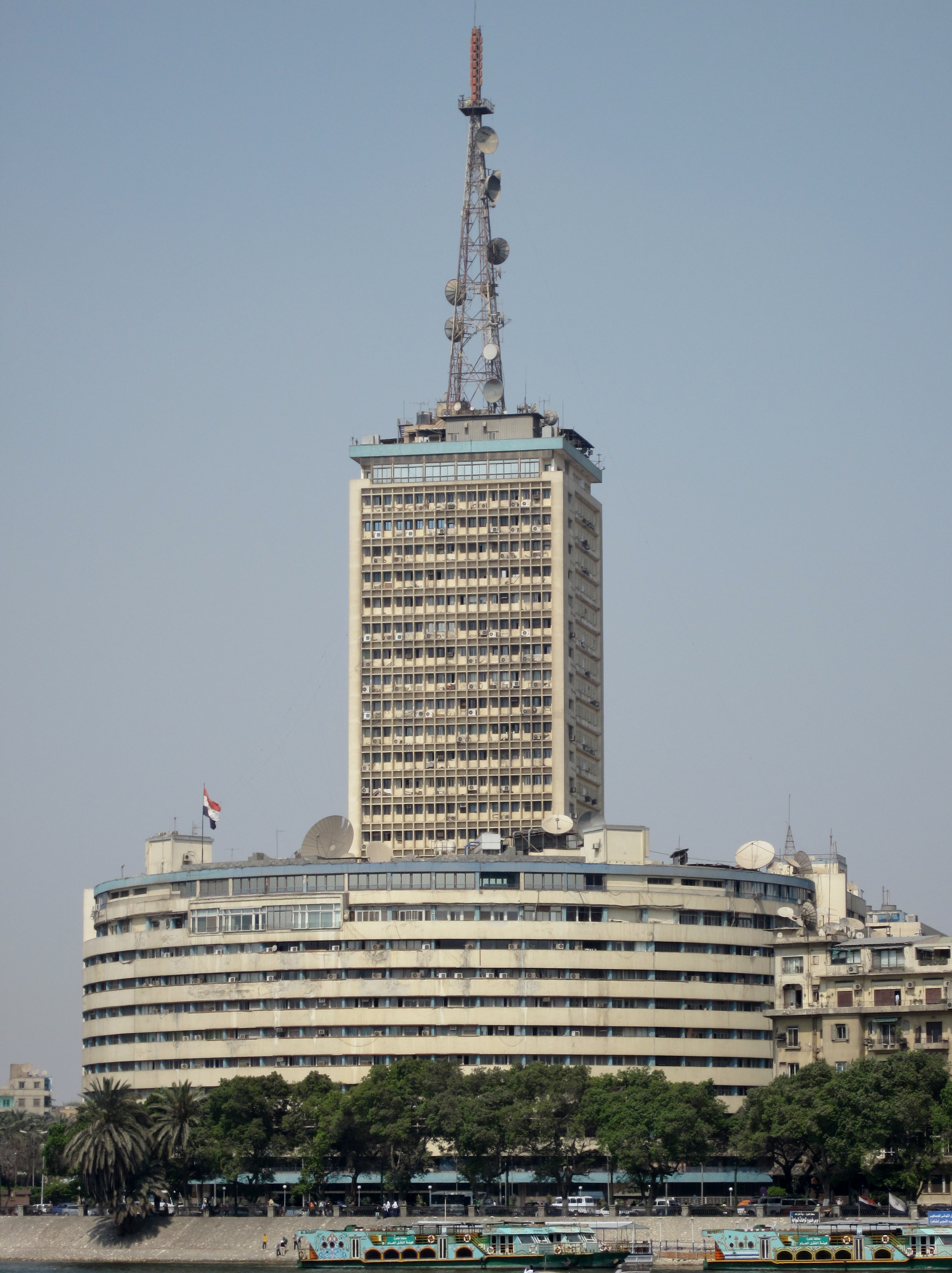
- Type: Broadcast radio, television and online
- Country: Egypt
- Availability: National; international
- Headquarters: Maspero television building, Cairo, Egypt
- Owner: Government of Egypt
- Launch date: 1945; 81 years ago
- Former names: Egyptian State Broadcasting (الإذاعة الحكومية المصرية)
- Official website: www.maspero.eg

The National Media Authority (Egyptian Arabic: الهيئة الوطنية للإعلام, romanized: al-Hayʾa l-Waṭaniyya li-l-ʾIʿlām), formerly known as Egyptian State Broadcasting (ESU; Egyptian Arabic: الهيئة الوطنية للإعلام, romanized: Alhayyat Alwataniat Lil'iielam), is the state and public broadcaster of Egypt, operated by the Egyptian government. It is a member of the European Broadcasting Union (EBU) and the Arab States Broadcasting Union (ABSU).

== History ==
Egyptian Radio began broadcasting on 31 May 1934 in agreement with the Marconi Company. The General Manager of the station for the period was Said Basha Lotfi who presided over the station from May 1934 to December 1947. In December 1947, the contract with Marconi was suspended in favour of an Egyptian national broadcasting station. The station is known also for its call "This is Cairo" (Arabic: هنا القاهرة, romanized: Hunā l-Qāhira). It is considered the "First Program" (البرنامج الأول, al-Barnāmaj al-ʾAwwal) of the ERTU.

Later on, three main new radio channels were added, namely the pan-Arab Voice of the Arabs (صوت العرب, Ṣawt al-ʿArab) in 1953, Egyptian Radio's Second Programme (البرنامج الثاني, al-Barnāmaj ath-Thānī) in 1957, and the pan-Arab Middle East Radio (إذاعة الشرق الأوسط, ʾIdhāʿat ash-Sharq al-ʾAwsaṭ) in 1964. All four stations broadcast on high powered medium wave transmitters covering most of the Middle East and North and East Africa.

Egyptian television began broadcasting six hours daily on 21 July 1960, with a state-run channel that held a monopoly on terrestrial broadcasts. In 1971, a new decree established the Arab Radio and Television Union, and created four distinct sectors: radio, television, engineering, and finance, each of which had a chairman who reported directly to the minister of information. The name of the Union was changed to the Egyptian Radio and Television Union, the name by which it is still known. Today, its total daily broadcast time on its various channels amounts to 490 hours.

Already in 1950 its predecessor, the Egyptian State Broadcasting (الإذاعة الحكومية المصرية, al-ʾIdhāʿa l-Ḥukūmiyya l-Miṣriyya), was one of the founding members of the European Broadcasting Union in 1950. After the admittance of the Israel Broadcasting Service in 1958, it cancelled its active memberships, as did the Syrian Broadcasting Services. It was readmitted as an active member on 1 January 1985.

Under previous secularist regimes, women employees wearing hijabs were not allowed on-screen until 2 September 2012, following the inauguration of the Morsi government.

== Services and subsidiaries ==
The NMA is an Egyptian SOE that runs a large spectrum of radio, television and satellite channels, in addition to television and film production facilities. It does this directly as well as through a host of companies that include:

- Egyptian Media Production City Co SAE
- Sono Cairo
- Egyptian Satellites Co SAE (Nilesat)
- Nile Radio Network

=== Radio ===
==== General stations ====
- General Programme Radio (إذاعة البرنامج العام, ʾIdhāʿat al-Barnāmaj al-ʿĀmm) or Egyptian Radio – established in 1934 as the main channel of the network
- Voice of the Arabs (إذاعة صوت العرب, ʾIdhāʿat Ṣawt al-ʿArab) – established in 1953 as a pan-Arab station
- Second Program (البرنامج الثاني, al-Barnāmaj ath-Thānī) – established in 1957 (now replaced and converted into the Cultural Radio)
- Middle East Radio (إذاعة الشرق الأوسط, ʾIdhāʿat ash-Sharq al-ʾAwsaṭ) – established in 1964 as a pan-Arab station
- European Program Radio (إذاعة البرنامج الأوربي, ʾIdhāʿat al-Barnāmaj al-ʾŌrōbbī) – broadcasting in English, French, Greek, Italian and German

==== Specialized (thematic) stations ====
- Cultural Radio (إذاعة البرنامج الثقافي, ʾIdhāʿat al-Barnāmaj ath-ʿThaqāfī) – replaced the Second Program
- Youth and Sports Radio (إذاعة الشباب والرياضة, ʾIdhāʿat ash-Shabāb wa-r-ʾRiyāḍa) – established in 1975
- Radio Greater Cairo (إذاعة القاهرة الكبرى, ʾIdhāʿat al-Qāhira l-Kubrā) – established in 1981
- Songs Radio (إذاعة الأغاني, ʾIdhāʿat al-ʾAghānī) – established in 2000
- News and Music Radio (إذاعة الأخبار والموسيقى, ʾIdhāʿat al-ʾAkhbār wa-l-Mūsīqā)
- Radio Masr or (إذاعة راديو مصر, ʾIdhāʿat Rādiyō Miṣr) or Egypt Radio – established in 2009
- Al Qur'an al Karim Radio (إذاعة القرآن الكريم, ʾIdhāʿat al-Qurʾān al-Karīm) – Muslim religious broadcasting
- Educational Radio (الإذاعة التعليمية, al-ʾIdhāʿa t-Taʿlīmiyya)
- Voice of Palestine (صوت فلسطين, Ṣawt Filasṭīn)

==== Regional programming radio stations ====
- North of Saaeed Radio (إذاعة شمال الصعيد, ʾIdhāʿat Shamāl aṣ-Ṣaʿīd)
- Nile Valley Radio (إذاعة وادي النيل, ʾIdhāʿat Wādī n-Nīl)
- Middle Delta Radio (إذاعة وسط الدلتا, ʾIdhāʿat Wasṭ ad-Diltā)
- Radio Alexandria (إذاعة الإسكندرية, ʾIdhāʿat al-ʾIskandariyya)

==== International stations ====
- Radio Cairo (International) including Radio Cairo World Service 1 to 7 (various channels, shortwave and satellite)

=== Television ===
==== National ====
- Channel 1 – Generalist and informative programming. It began its broadcasts in 1960.
- Channel 2 – focused on fiction, entertainment and current affairs programming, launched in 1961.
- Al Masriya – Channel aimed at the Egyptian diaspora, available since 1990.

==== Regional ====
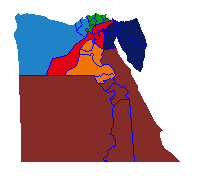
Target areas of the channels of the ERTU/NMA Al-Mahrousa Network: Cairo in red, Canal in dark blue, Alexandria in light blue, Delta in green, Upper in orange and Thebes in brown

There are six state-owned broadcast and satellite channels in Egypt:

- Six regional channels, each providing specialized services for a number of governorates. These are grouped under the Al Mahrousa Television Network (شبكة تليفزيون المحروسة):
  - Cairo Channel (Channel 3): broadcasting from Cairo and covering Greater Cairo governorates, i.e. Cairo, Giza, and Qalioubia.
  - Canal Channel (Channel 4): broadcasting from Ismailia and covering Suez Canal governorates, i.e. Ismailia, Suez, and Port Said.
  - Alexandria Channel (Channel 5): broadcasting from Alexandria and covering Alexandria, Al Buhayrah, and parts of Matrouh.
  - Delta Channel (Channel 6): broadcasting from Tanta and covering Central Delta governorates, i.e. Al Gharbiyah, Al Minufiyah, Ad Daqahliyah, Kafr ash Shaykh, and Dimyat.
  - Upper Channel (Channel 7): broadcasting from Minya and covering Northern Upper Egypt governorates, i.e. Minya, El-Fayoum, Beni Suef, and Asiut.
  - Thebes Channel (Channel 8): broadcasting from Aswan and covering Southern Upper Egypt governorates, i.e. Suhag, Qena, Al Uqsur, and Aswan.

As of 2005, the Cairo frequencies for the two ERTU channels, the two Nile TV channels and the networks for the governorates were as follows: ERTU 1 channel 5; ERTU 2 channel 9; ERTU 3 channel 7; ERTU 4 channel 40; ERTU 5 channel 46; ERTU 6 channel 43; ERTU 7 channel 34; ERTU 8 channel 26; Nile TV channel 22; Nile News channel 38.

=== Nile Television Network ===
Nilesat allowed for the launch of several specialized TV channels in addition to Egyptian Satellite Channel (ESC) and Nile TV. All are owned by the Egyptian state.

Specialized channels include:

- Nile News
- Nile Culture channel
- Nile Comedy channel
- Nile Drama channel, specialized in Drama, mainly movies and TV series.
- Nile Cinema channel, specialized in classic and old movies and started in 2008.
- Nile Educational channels, several channels for primary, preparatory, secondary, medical and language education.
- Nile Family channel
- Nile Sports channel
- Nile Life channel, specialized in various forms of entertainment mainly concerts, music videos, contests and some talk shows.
- Tanweer channel

== See also ==
- List of radio stations in Egypt
