= Delta Channel =

Egyptian regional television channel

The Delta Channel (Arabic: قناة الدلتا), also known as Channel 6 (القناة السادسة), is one of the six regional channels of the National Media Authority. The channel is based out of Tanta and has terrestrial coverage in the Central Delta region: Al Gharbiyah, Al Minufiyah, Ad Daqahliyah, Kafr ash Shaykh, and Dimyat.

== History ==
The channel started broadcasting on 31 May 1994. As of 2002, the channel broadcast for a daily average of 16 hours and 36 minutes.

A December 2015 analysis by El Watan revealed that its programs often used the same studio, while wired microphones were constantly in use in outside interviews. One of its programs, Khair Al-Kalam, about inter-religious tolerance, had the presenter catching a cold without telling the director. Programs such as At Home had a set limited to one table and one chair. An afternoon talk show, Third Right, dedicated to politics, put the camera close to the interviewees. The news bulletin, Delta News, was shown at 8pm. One of the programs, Great Egypt, had an intro with no credits; the episode was dedicated to the then-upcoming elections (Votes in Egypt).

In 2020, the channel was temporarily used to carry language classes following the closure of schools due to the lockdown.
