= Zamalek TV =

Egyptian sports channel

Zamalek TV قناة نادي الزمالك
- Country: Egypt

Programming
- Language: Arabic
- Picture format: (1080p MPEG-4 HDTV)

Ownership
- Owner: Zamalek SC

History
- Launched: 2020; 6 years ago

Zamalek TV is an Egyptian television channel of Zamalek Sporting Club that broadcasts on Nilesat in SD quality. The broadcasting company started experimenting on 31 December 2019, and officially launched the channel on 22 January 2020.
