= ITV Choice =

Cable and satellite channel

- Country: United Kingdom
- Broadcast area: Asia; Africa; Middle East

Programming
- Language: English
- Picture format: 576i (SDTV); 1080i (HDTV)

Ownership
- Owner: ITV plc

History
- Launched: 1997; 29 years ago
- Closed: 20 August 2019; 6 years ago (Malta, Middle East and Asia); 4 June 2020; 5 years ago (Africa)
- Former names: Granada UKTV (1997–2008); Granada TV (2008–2010); ITV Granada (2010–2013)

Links
- Website: itvchoice.za.com

ITV Choice (formerly Granada UKTV, Granada TV and ITV Granada) was a British-based television channel owned and operated by ITV plc.

== History ==
ITV Granada logo from 2010 to 2013.

Former logo used 2013 to 2019.

The channel was launched in 1997 by Granada Media under the name Granada UKTV, and offered cable and satellite services in Middle East, Malta and Asia. It was also carried by Sky Network Television in New Zealand between 1999 and 2002.

The service was expanded and relaunched as Granada TV during 2008, when ITV announced plans to offer the channel to cable and satellite operators in Asia.

On 1 November 2010, it was rebranded as ITV Granada. The channel was renamed again as ITV Choice on 25 March 2013.

On 20 August 2019, it suddenly ceased broadcasting in many markets across the Middle East, Malta and Asia, while transmission in South Africa was unaffected. On 18 March 2020, it was announced that the channel would cease broadcasting in Africa on 4 June of that year. Tipping Point was the last programme to be broadcast on the channel before closure in Africa.

In December 2022, an ITV Choice branded FAST channel was launched on the Samsung TV Plus platform in Australia in December 2022, which airs various ITV Studios-owned programmes. In October 2023, it was renamed as Entertain by ITV Studios.

== Programming ==
It primarily carried ITV and other UK programming, produced by ITV Studios and other independent production companies. Key programmes include Coronation Street, Emmerdale, Ant & Dec's Saturday Night Takeaway, Dancing on Ice, I'm a Celebrity...Get Me Out of Here!, The Jonathan Ross Show, Doc Martin, The Chase, Tipping Point, among others.

== Availability ==
- Asia and Middle East on Measat 3
- Australia on Samsung TV Plus
- Malaysia on Astro (channel 735, from 21 December 2009 until 16 January 2017)
- New Zealand on Sky Television (from January 1999 until 1 January 2002)
- Taiwan on Chunghwa Telecom (channel 82, from 6 December 2010)
- Malta on GO Channel 305 and Melita Cable (channel 309)
- The Middle East on Star TV's Star Select service, Orbit Showtime Network OSN channel 47 and Arab Digital Distribution
- Hong Kong on now TV (channel 517, from 7 September 2010) and Star TV (from January 1997 until 1 January 2002)
- Indonesia on Skynindo (channel 27) and TelkomVision (channel 503)
- India on Airtel digital TV (from 5 January 2012)
- Singapore on mio TV (channel 23, from 15 July 2009 until 25 March 2013), StarHub TV (channel 523, from 1 December 2009 until 30 December 2013) and Singtel TV (channel 337, from 1 July 2015 until 19 August 2019)
- Thailand through Cable Thai Holding.
- Africa on DStv (from 5 May 2015 until 4 June 2020)
