= Cairo Channel =

Egyptian regional television channel

The Cairo Channel (Arabic: قناة القاهرة), also known as Channel 3 (القناة الثالثة), is one of the six regional channels of the National Media Authority. The channel existed in the 1960s and was resumed in 1985.

== History ==
The Third Channel was introduced in July 1962 and was, in its first incarnation, a cultural and educational television channel. As of 1967, 40% of its programming consisted of foreign films. The channel broadcast exclusively in Cairo and broadcast on channel 9 and catered an audience of diplomats, with news services in English and French. The beginning of the Six-Day War caused ERTU to close the channel in 1967 due to financial concerns. Its closure meant that the ERTU had to cut in the acquisition of imports. Other sources believe that the channel suspended in 1970 not long after President Nasser died, but relaunched in October 1971.

On 6 October 1985 (coinciding with the anniversary of an Egyptian victory in the Sinai conflict in 1973), the Cairo Channel resumed broadcasting, this time on channel 7 (channel 9 was reclaimed by Channel 2). The channel catered to Cairo, Kalioubia and Giza and was the first regional television channel opened by ERTU. In its first months, its programming was extremely limited, broadcasting on average for two hours a day, from 6pm to 8pm, with occasional extensions past the period, to air theatre plays on Saturdays (ending at 9pm) and Egyptian movies on Thursdays (ending at 10pm).

In 2017, news presenter Azza al-Henawi left the channel. After her suspension, she was caught criticizing Egyptian politicians and sharing content from the Muslim Brotherhood. The case was taken to court starting in 2015.

As of 2015, this and the six other channels of the ERTU Al-Mahrousa group were criticized in the Egyptian press for lacking sophistication, having limited presence on social media and having limitations in the studio. One of its programs, however, Line and Thread, a program dedicated to decoration, had amassed 277,000 Facebook followers and 14,000 YouTube subscribers.
