= Al-Nahar (TV network) =

- Country: Egypt
- Broadcast area: Middle East, Canada
- Headquarters: Cairo, Egypt

Programming
- Picture format: 576i (SDTV, 2011–2016); 720p (HDTV, 2016–present)

Ownership
- Owner: Trenta for Art Production and Distribution (Egyptian version); Ethnic Channels Group (Canadian version)
- Sister channels: Al-Nahar +2 (also known as Al-Nahar One +2); Al-Nahar Drama +2; Al-Nahar Movies; Al-Nahar Al-Youm; Al-Nahar Noor; Al-Nahar Cinema; Al-Nahar Türkiye

History
- Launched: 30 June 2011
- Former names: Orbit Al Yawm (2011–2015, Canadian version only); Al-Nahar One (2016–2017)

Al-Nahar (Egyptian Arabic: النهار) is an Egyptian television network. Programming includes talk shows, political discussions, dramas, news, movies, mini-series, game shows and reality series.

== History ==
Al-Nahar was launched on 30 June 2011, by the Egyptian businessman Alaa El Kahky.

The Canadian version of the channel originally launched as Orbit Al Yawm (Arabic: أوربت اليوم) but was subsequently re-branded as Al-Nahar TV in July 2011.

It was renamed to Al-Nahar One between 2016 and 2017 but reverted to just Al-Nahar.

== Current Channels ==
=== Al-Nahar Drama (Arabic: النهار دراما) ===
It was launched on 1 August 2011. It mainly broadcasts popular Arabic television series and dramas, hence the name.

=== Al-Nahar Life (Arabic: النهار لايف) ===
This new channel is expected to be launched sometime in late 2025. It is speculated that it will be airing general talk shows and programs, similar to Nile Life.

== Former Channels ==
=== Al-Nahar Ryada (Arabic: النهار رياضة) ===
It was launched on 8 December 2011, and broadcast sports-related TV shows. It closed in 2016, and its programs were merged with Al-Nahar Al-Youm.

=== Al-Nahar (Arabic: النهار اليوم) ===
It was launched in May 2014, and broadcast news-related TV shows.

=== Al-Nahar Movies (Arabic: النهار موفيز) ===
It was launched in May 2012, and broadcast foreign movies. It closed in 2013.

=== Al-Nahar Cinema (Arabic: النهار سينما) ===
It was launched in February 2016, and broadcast Egyptian movies. It closed in 2017.

=== Al-Nahar Noor (Arabic: النهار نور) ===
It was launched in Ramadan 2015, and broadcast religious TV shows, but was closed after Ramadan 2017. It relaunched in 2023, though only airing Quran recitings. It was eventually fully relaunched on 1 December 2024, but got replaced by Al-Nahar Life on 15 August 2025

=== Al-Nahar +2 (Arabic: النهار 2+) ===
It was launched on 20 July 2012, and broadcast content from Al-Nahar TV after two hours. It was later closed, only to be relaunched as Al-Nahar One +2 until it was closed again. During Ramadan 2017, it was relaunched again until it was closed again after the end of Ramadan.

=== Al-Nahar Drama +2 (Arabic: النهار دراما 2+) ===
It was launched on 20 July 2012, and broadcast content from Al-Nahar Drama after two hours, but was later closed. During Ramadan 2017, it was relaunched again until it was closed again after the end of Ramadan.

== Gallery ==
Orbit Al Yawm's logo (2011–2016)

Al-Nahar Plus2's logo (2016–2017)

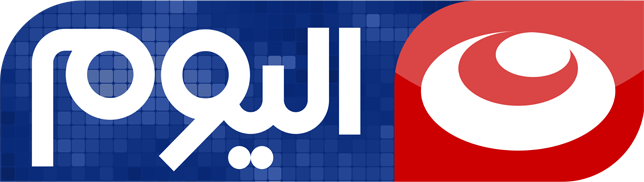
Al-Nahar Al-Youm's logo (2016)

== See also ==
- Television in Egypt
