= Channel 1 (Egypt) =

Channel 1 القناة الأولى
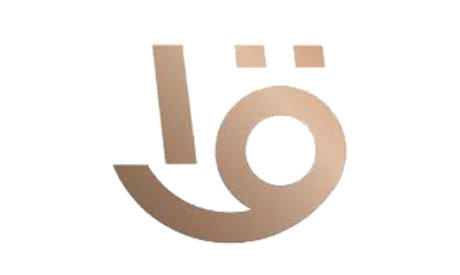
- Type: Terrestrial television
- Country: Egypt
- Broadcast area: Nationally

Programming
- Language: Arabic

Ownership
- Owner: Egyptian Radio and Television Union

History
- Launched: 21 July 1960; 66 years ago

Channel 1 (Arabic: القناة الأولى المصرية) was the First Egyptian TV channel and public entertainment channel owned and operated by Egyptian Radio and Television Union. The channel became part of National Media Authority (NMA) under Ministry of Information in 2017.

== History ==
Egyptian Television Channel 1 first aired on 21 July 1960 as Egyptian Arab Television (EAT) on VHF channel 5. It used a 10 kW transmitter produced by RCA. A second channel, Second Program launched on 4 November 1961. It was originally named First Program (later Al-Oaula and Al-Thaniya). Third Program was launched on 24 July 1963 but ended in 1967 due to Egypt's loss in the Six-Day War and economic outbreak. Channel 3 relaunced in 1985 as Cairo Channel.

ERTU 1 and ERTU 2 started airing color programming on 25 December 1973 during Christmas in SECAM-B (same as France and Soviet Union) Channel 2's first color program was a speech by Anwar Sadat on Israeli aggression in Yom Kippur War. In 1977 during Sadat's visit to Israel, it began airing in color on both channels.

On 1 May 1991, ERTU transitioned its color system from SECAM to PAL. The channel played a role in the 2010-2011 Egyptian Revolution leading to the collapse of Hosni Mubarak's regime.
