= Alexandria Channel =

Egyptian regional television channel

The Alexandria Channel (Arabic: قناة الإسكندرية), also known as Channel 5 (القناة الخامسة), is one of the six regional channels of the National Media Authority. The channel is based out of Alexandria and has terrestrial coverage in the governorate, as well as Al Buhayrah and parts of Matrouh.

== History ==
The channel started broadcasting on 12 December 1990. As of 2002, the channel broadcast for a daily average of 17 hours and 44 minutes. In 2005, the channel started satellite broadcasting on Nilesat, but was briefly suspended from its satellite. For over 20 years, the channel's name was Channel 5, but it adopted the name Alexandria Channel on 1 June 2011.

El Watan covered a specific day in late 2015. Broadcasting started with Sabah Al-Mahrousa, which is carried by the regional channels. The channel also reran Egyptian TV series. At a time when children's programming was becoming lesser seen on Egyptian television, the channel produced Play in Play, which was presented by Engy Ahmed Helmy, a child. The early afternoon program was My Thoughts, Girls. It included news items of interest to women, as well as, considering the upcoming parliamentary elections, there was an interview segment on the roles of women in the voting process. During some breaks, the channel aired patriotic songs to anticipate voting among viewers. During primetime, the channel aired Forum. By then, the channel had limited production capacities. Like the other channels of the Al-Mahrousa Television Network, it is plagued by a lack of audience, even among locals, which also included lack of control over its programs and lack of quality while covering local events. Commercial breaks are devoid of advertising. In 2017, breaks mainly consisted of the program schedule. The overall feel of the channels in 2017 alone was, according to an Elam journalist, as if it were stuck in the 1980s, and urged the need of a time machine to update the quality of its studios to contemporary levels. Studios at the time were still stuck at a time when ERTU/NMA only had terrestrial channels.
