= CTV (Egyptian TV channel) =

Egyptian Coptic Orthodox TV channel

Coptic TV (Arabic Egypt TV channel)
- Type: Television
- Country: Egypt

Ownership
- Owner: Coptic Orthodox Church of Alexandria

History
- Launched: 2007; 19 years ago
- Founder: Coptic Orthodox Church of Alexandria

Links
- Webcast: www.ctvchannel.tv/en/live-tv
- Website: CTV Channel

Coptic TV (CTV) is the official Coptic Orthodox TV station broadcasting in Arabic via satellite to viewers in Egypt. Tharwat Bassily, a business man, was instrumental in establishing the television network, which was started in 2007.

CTV subsequently started broadcasting in North America and elsewhere. Their headquarters are located in Cairo, Egypt.

== History ==
CTV channel was established in 2007 under the initiative of Pope Shenouda III, the Pope of Alexandria and Patriarch of the See of St. Mark. It was launched as the first official satellite television channel of the Coptic Orthodox Church, aiming to provide spiritual and religious content for Copts in Egypt and the diaspora, as well as to broadcast liturgies and church events.

The channel began its experimental broadcast in late 2007, followed by its official launch, offering a range of religious and educational programs, in addition to live coverage of liturgies and services from the Saint Mark’s Coptic Orthodox Cathedral and other churches.

Following the death of Pope Shenouda III in 2012, the channel continued its operations under the leadership of Pope Tawadros II, who supported its further development and expansion while maintaining its core mission of promoting Coptic Orthodox teachings and strengthening communication with the Church’s followers worldwide.

Since its establishment, the channel has witnessed gradual development in both broadcast quality and content, introducing a wider variety of programs addressing biblical interpretation, youth, family, and church ministry, alongside live coverage of major religious occasions.
