= Channel 2 (Egypt) =

Channel 2 القناة الثانية
- Type: Terrestrial television
- Country: Egypt
- Broadcast area: Nationwide

Programming
- Language: Arabic

Ownership
- Owner: Egyptian Radio and Television Union

History
- Launched: 4 November 1961; 64 years ago

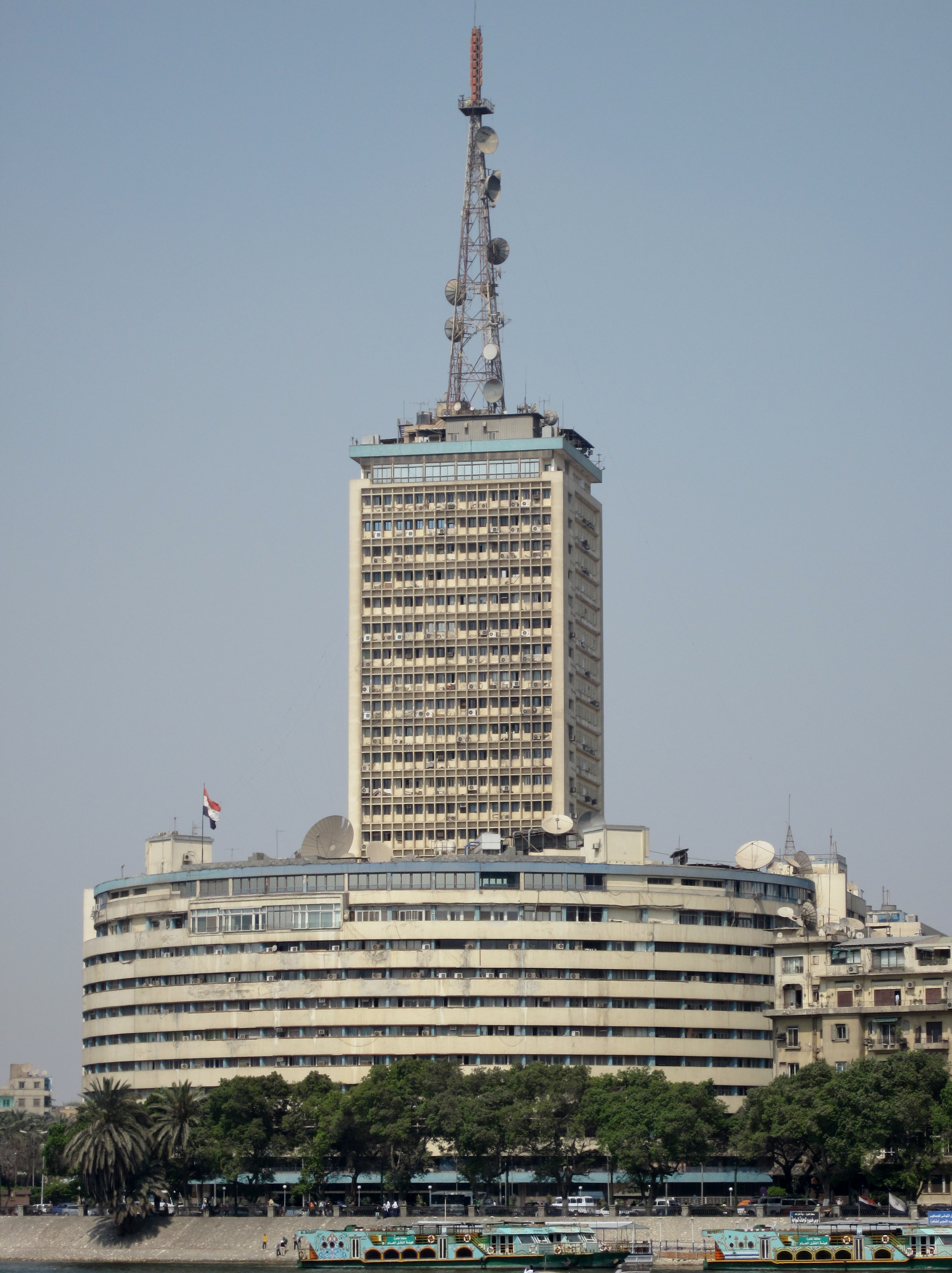
Maspiro Building (Egyptian Radio & Television Union HQ)

Channel 2 (Arabic: القناة الثانية المصرية) is an Egyptian entertainment channel owned and operated by the Egyptian Radio and Television Union.

== History ==
The channel started broadcasting in November 1961 on VHF channel 7 in Cairo using a 20 kW transmitter. In July 1963, a second station, on channel 11, opened in Alexandria, using a 24 kW transmitter. By the mid-1980s, the channel took on a more cultural approach to its programming, trying to balance programs dedicated to local and foreign cultures. The channel at the time opened at 3pm on weekdays and Saturdays, 1pm on Fridays and 10am on Sundays and ended around midnight after News of the Past 24 Hours. The channel also carried news bulletins in French (Journal Télévisé) and English (Telenews).

By 2008, the channel was airing football matches, especially those involving Egyptian teams. By the time of an approval made by Al-Ahly to carry its matches on television again, it carried out the terrestrial rights, alongside the Egyptian Satellite Channel and Nile Sports. In January 2010, the channel's successful talk show, El-Beit Beitak, announced its cancellation from March after nearly five and a half years on air, per a decision taken by production company Baraka Designs which refused to renew its contract. On 21 December 2013, the channel started broadcasting a 40-episode Arabic dub of Chinese drama series Happy Life, about a doctor from Beijing. The series came in as part of a protocol signed with the Chinese state media apparatus airing for free, with ERTU only paying for the Arabic dubbing. A program seen on the channel, Itlalah (Appearance) cause massive concern from Egyptian netizens and privately-owned websites in August 2016 due to the weight of the presenters.
