= Egyptian Media Production City =

Coordinates: 29°57′40″N 31°1′5″E

- Company type: Public company
- Industry: Production company
- Founded: 1989; 37 years ago
- Headquarters: 6th of October City, Giza, Egypt
- Key people: Osama Hekal (Chairman)
- Website: Official website

Egyptian Media Production City Co SAE (EMPC) is an information and media complex located in the city of 6th of October City in the Giza Governorate of Egypt. It is listed on the Egyptian Exchange, though most of its shares are owned by the Government of Egypt through the National Media Authority as well as other state-owned enterprises (SOEs). It covers an area of about 35 million square meters (more than 600 feddans).

== History ==
Construction of the project began in 1992. Phase I was completed in the same year. Then President Hosni Mubarak laid the foundation stone for EMPC Phase II on 29 May 1994.

Phase II was inaugurated in June 1996. The EMPC was launched in 2000. The Pharaonic city: (Tel El Amarna), simulates the ancient Egyptian capital of the Egyptian Pharaoh Akhenaten. Architectural designs, drawings, specifications and construction were completed under the supervision of an archaeologist. The city comprises about 40 simulated statues of Akhenaten and Nefertiti. The Islamic Village: is built over an area of 60,000 m^{2}. The architectural style of the village buildings belongs mainly to the Fatimid and Mameluk periods, in addition to other styles. The village was designed by specialists in Islamic Architecture. Magic Land (Children's village). An entrance gate (Egypt's Gate) was built showing models of most renowned tourist attractions and monuments of Egypt, such as Egyptian temples, Bibliotic of Alexandria, Giza Pyramids, citadels and fortresses, and Cairo Citadel. This area also contains the Magic Land, and the Dino Jungle, with life-size models of pre-historic monsters such as electronically animated dinosaurs, moving amidst audio-visual effects, as well as the ancient ape-man and birds.

The city also contains an underwater film shooting area and a dolphin area contains a pool, where dolphin and water ballet shows are performed. The city's facilities are sub-divided into Western European, oriental-style areas, as well as children's competition areas and public places for outdoor shooting.

An open theatre, the largest of its kind, is built with open-air halls, and covered terraces, with a new architectural design. The theatre accommodates 1,000 spectators, in addition to theatre boxes (Bargnoires) for 40 spectators. The area also houses "Ali Baba's cave", where the mythical story is shown via computer-animated puppets. There is also the traffic city for children and young men. It is a shooting area, with stores, coffeeshops, and gas stations. The Suzanne Mubarak Data Centre houses all information and data on EMPC. It contains an electronic library, computers, various world encyclopedias and connections with the Internet. The contract for constructing and equipping the International Studio Complex at the EMPC was signed in January 1997. The complex comprises 114 cinematographic, television and video shooting studios, where state-of-the-art technology is to be used. The project is expected to be completed within three years, at a total cost of 340 million US dollar, including costs of infrastructure, construction, equipment and appliances.

According to studies already conducted, a holding company is to be set up to run EMPC, with three subsidiaries, one for production, another for services and maintenance and a third for tourism. The company has an authorized capital of LE 2 billion, and a paid-up capital of LE 1.5 billion. Forty per cent of the company's paid-up capital is subscribed by the Radio and Television Union and ten % by banks, while 20-25%, amounting to LE 400 million will be floated for public subscription.

== Infrastructure ==
- Studios Complex: comprises 14 high technological studios of various sizes, together with annexes and utilities.
- Open-air shooting areas ranging from 600 m^{2} to 2,500 m^{2} each, equipped with film shooting and tourist services.
- Covered Theatre Hall: the 2500-seat hall serves television production of dramatic performances and concerts. It can be also used as an auditorium for conferences and festivals as well as for the 6th of October city community purposes.
- Open-air Theatres: serve summer variety / musical / show performances and lyric concerts for television production purposes. The grand theatre accommodates 1,500 persons and the mini-theatre accommodates 1000 children.
- Services Complex: Provides fabricating and processing works for the Studios Complex and outdoor shooting areas.
- Film Laboratory: Provides film processing services for 16 mm and 35 mm films. Color correction, editing (montage), final sound recording and dubbing and final version printing are also provided. The laboratory production capacity is estimated at 100 film per year, apart from short materials.
- Hotel: contains 250 rooms, in addition to all other amenities, offering a high-quality, 4-star hotel service.
- Training center: contains all facilities necessary to train 3,000 persons per year. The center provides training to staff members of the Radio and Television Union, in various fields of specialization.
- Staff Club: Provides social and sporting activities to the project staff as well as staff members of the Radio and Television Union.

== See also ==
- Studio Misr
- United Media Services
