= Leaders' debate =

Public debate held during a general election campaign

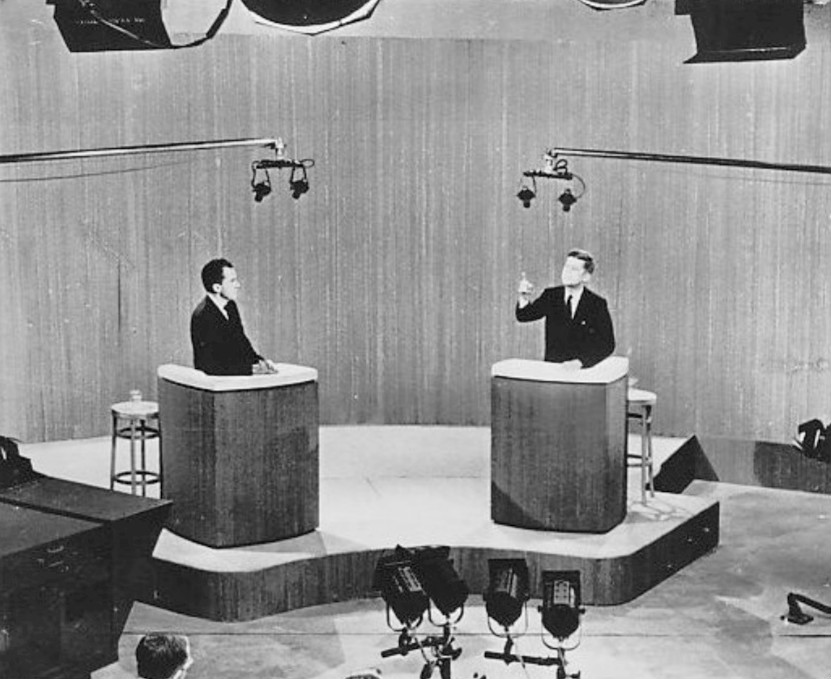
Presidential debate between John F. Kennedy and Richard Nixon for the 1960 election in the United States.

A leaders' debate or presidential debate is a public debate held during a general election campaign, where the candidates disseminate their political opinions and public policy proposals, and criticism of them, to potential voters. They are normally broadcast live on radio, television and the Internet. The events may be organized by media corporations or non-government organizations.

Leaders' debates are often popular with voters, whose decisions might be greatly influenced by the outcome. Leaders have occasionally attempted to use props (such as charts or signs bearing slogans) during a debate with varying degrees of success.

== History ==
Precursors to television debates were the candidate forums broadcast over radio in elections in the 1920s. The 1960 United States presidential debates between John F. Kennedy and Richard Nixon was viewed by 70 million people, but many world leaders decided from the American experience that it would be unwise to debate opponents on television.

The US example would nonetheless spur the desire to hold similar, televised debates in countries under the parliamentary system. Television had quickly proven to be an excellent and efficient means of reaching out to large blocs of the electorate. The unique aspect of the parliamentary system which creates the desire to hold leaders' debates is that the party leader is usually the party's presumed candidate to lead the government, because by constitutional convention he or she will usually become prime minister or premier if his or her party is able to obtain a majority, by itself or as part of a coalition government. However, a leaders' debate is not technically a candidates debate in the same sense that an American presidential debate would be, because in the latter case the American political parties have explicitly nominated the named individuals as their candidates for president and vice president.

== Format ==
The exact format for a leaders' debate varies, but normally the debate will begin with each leader making a short opening statement. Then a panel of well-known journalists will ask sets of prepared questions, which are to be answered either by all of the leaders or by one specific leader. After the leader(s) answer each question, the other leader(s) may get a chance to make a brief response, after which there may be some time allocated for an often heated "free for all" debate. The moderator will usually attempt to exercise some control through all of this, and then stop the debate after time has elapsed so the next question can be asked. After the panelists finish asking questions, each leader will make his or her closing remarks and the debate will end.

Who gets invited to participate in a leaders' debate is often a sensitive issue. Some jurisdictions may have dozens of fringe political parties which few networks would care to have participating in their debates. For the sake of brevity, and to ensure the leaders of the main parties have adequate time to address voters on a wide range of issues, it is extremely rare for any leaders' debate to have more than five leaders. A more common number would be three while Australia has two. Leaders' debates are often restricted to parties which elected representatives in the previous election. Exceptions may be made for parties with close to a full slate of candidates, but this is not always the case. For example, in Canada in the 2004 and 2006 the Green Party of Canada was excluded from the federal leaders' debates until 2008 when public pressure on the other parties allowed the Green Party to join the debate, and the Alberta Alliance was excluded from the Albertan provincial leaders debate, even though both parties had full slates in their respective elections. Parties that are excluded will often complain bitterly about their exclusion, sometimes claiming that the political establishment has conspired in an effort to keep their party on the political fringe. The inclusion of certain parties in debates can be controversial too. A common complaint about the Canadian debates is voiced by a report from the Centre for the Study of Democracy, which calls for the Bloc Québécois, a party only active in mostly French-speaking Quebec, to be removed from its current position in the English-language debates.

In Georgia, debates were often so heated that the debaters would be placed in separate rooms.

The 2019 Ukrainian presidential election innovated a new approach to the concept of a leaders' debate, where now-president, then-candidate Volodymyr Zelenskyy proposed to hold debates publicly in the country's largest stadium, the Kyiv Olympic Stadium. After much negotiation, the debates were held 48 hours before the election between then-president Petro Poroshenko and Zelenskyy, in front of nearly 30,000 spectators.

== Participating countries ==
The following countries hold leaders' debates:

- Argentina
- Australia - see 2016 and 2019
- Brazil - see 2010, 2014 and 2018
- Canada
- Chile - see 2013
- Czech Republic - see 2013 and 2018
- Ecuador
- Egypt - see 2012
- France
- Georgia
- Germany
- Indonesia - see 2024
- Ireland
- Iran - see 2013 and 2017
- Kenya
- Malta
- Mexico
- Netherlands
- New Zealand - see 2017 and 2020
- Philippines - see 1992, 2016, 2019 and 2022
- Portugal - see 2019 and 2021
- Spain
- Tunisia - see 2019
- United Kingdom - see 2010, 2015, 2017, 2019 and 2024
- United States
- Uruguay

== See also ==
- Party political broadcast
