= 2017 Iranian presidential election debates =

There were three live televised debates in total. First debate focused on social issues while the next two revolved around economic and political matters. The candidates had drawn lots to determine their seating arrangement for the debate.

== Debates ==
Debates
| Date | Organizers | Moderators | P Present I Invitee NI Non-invitee A Absent invitee | | | | | | Notes |
| Date | Organizers | Moderators | Hassan Rouhani | Ebrahim Raisi | Mohammad Bagher Ghalibaf | Eshaq Jahangiri | Mostafa Mir-Salim | Mostafa Hashemitaba | Notes |
|---|---|---|---|---|---|---|---|---|---|
| 28 April; 16:30 IRST | IRIB; Channel 1 | Morteza Heidari | P | P | P | P | P | P | Cultural-Social |
| 5 May; 16:30 IRST | IRIB; Channel 1 | Morteza Heidari | P | P | P | P | P | P | Political |
| 12 May; 16:30 IRST | IRIB; Channel 1 | Morteza Heidari | P | P | P | P | P | P | Economical |

=== First debate ===
1st debate
- Date: 28 April 2017
- Time: 16:30 IRST
- Duration: 3 hours
- Venue: IRIB headquarters
- Location: Tehran, Iran
- Type: Debate
- Theme: Social issues
- Organised by: Islamic Republic of Iran Broadcasting; Election Campaign Monitoring Commission
- Filmed by: Channel One; IRINN
- Participants: Mohammad Bagher Ghalibaf; Mostafa Hashemitaba; Eshaq Jahangiri; Mostafa Mirsalim; Hassan Rouhani
- Footage: Youtube / Aparat.com
- Moderator: Morteza Heidari

==== Summary ====
The candidates outlined their plans for the post. They were given an equal time to garner as many votes as possible in order to win the ticket to the office. The live broadcast, which lasted for three hours, aimed to reduce the candidates' campaign spending and pave the way for eligible voters to make their choice based on the sharp-cut and unambiguous plans represented during the program.

Upon entering the headquarters of the Islamic Republic of Iran Broadcasting (IRIB) in the capital, Tehran, Hassan Rouhani was asked if he was ready, to which he responded, "We're probably all ready that we have come [here]." Meanwhile, Mehr News Agency reported that the debate had been put off half an hour to 16:30 local time (12:00 GMT) upon the request of Rouhani's campaign.

Morteza Heidari, the renowned Iranian television news host and presenter who moderated the debate, also said he was prepared for the task and everything had been rehearsed. The debate began with Heidari outlining its format and regulations and how the time would be broken up between the candidates.

==== Settlement on outskirts of cities ====
Mostafa Mir-Salim was the first candidate to answer the first question about settlements on the outskirts and peripheries of cities. This too was determined through a draw. Mirsalim expressed his serious concern about lack of management of natural resources. He said correct water management would be the first step to reduce immigration from rural areas to cities. He added that lack of attention to proper spatial planning was the main reason behind immigration.

The other five candidates then took two-minute turns to make their own remarks on the issue and challenge Mir-Salim. Hashemitaba said Iran is plagued with severe environmental crisis. The third hopeful, incumbent Rouhani, said that immigration to big cities is a major problem not only in Iran but in most countries. He added that unemployment and low income are major reasons behind immigration to big cities. Ghalibaf, for his part, said social and economic imbalance is a major reason behind immigration. Jahangiri said attention to immigrants to big cities must be the first priority in tackling their problems. Raisi said the first priority is to have correct figures on immigration to big cities. While Ghalibaf put the number of outskirts dwellers at 11 million, Raisi said the figure belongs to four years ago and currently stands at around 16 million.

Mir-Salim then retook to the podium and said immigration should be curbed before it gives rise to social crises and added that 350,000 illegal wells have wasted the country's water resources and caused immigration. The candidate said social facilities must be distributed evenly in cities and villages and expressed regret that some 10.2 million Iranians are totally illiterate. He noted that suitable housing must be provided in small towns and villages to prevent immigration.

==== Social justice ====
Ebrahim Raisi was next up on the podium. He responded to a query on social justice and how to establish and promote it in Iran. In the four minutes allocated to him, Raisi said the GINI Index, a measurement of the income distribution of a country's residents, shows class divide has increased in Iran, adding that tripling subsidies handed out to lower classes would be a good way to narrow the social gaps. He noted that tax evasion must be prevented to promote social justice.

Hassan Rouhani stressed the importance of striking a balance between eastern and western parts of the country. Ghalibaf said promoting social justice would be difficult as long as urban crises are not resolved. Jahangiri said social justice is not limited to economic issues but also includes education, political and judicial matters.

Raisi once again took to the podium to give his responses and explanations about questions raised by the other hopefuls. He said joblessness and shutdown of production units are major problems facing the country's economy. He added that the next administration must make plans to narrow social gaps in a bid to promote justice.

==== Housing ====
Mostafa Hashemitaba was the third candidate who took to the podium to respond to a debate question about his plans to solve the country's housing problem. He said bank loans and mass construction would be good ways to tackle the housing problem, adding that job creation would help resolve this issue.

Eshaq Jahangiri said unoccupied housing units are the main obstacle to solving the housing problem and added that increasing bank loans and establishing housing investment funds would be good solutions to this issue.

Hashemitaba then retook to the podium and used his five-minute time to answer the raised questions.

==== Youth marriage ====
Hassan Rouhani was the next hopeful taking to the podium to respond to a debate question about his plans to encourage the youth marriage. He said unemployment was the main problem facing the promotion of youth marriage and added that boosting hope and avoiding unnecessary limitations in the society are key to solve problems. He said hope for future has increased in the Iranian society and employment has improved. Hope for future and employment are the best ways to promote youth marriage in Iran, Rouhani added.

Raisi said banking facilities, housing and employment are the main necessities to promote marriage among young Iranians. The other candidates also offered their viewpoints with Ghalibaf challenging Rouhani on an alleged pledge that Rouhani had made during the previous presidential campaign to create four million jobs. Rouhani denied ever making that promise.

Rouhani then said oil revenues and taxation are major sources of the administration's income and noted that his administration has reduced dependence on oil revenues to below 30 percent.

==== Cutting down on red tape ====
Eshaq Jahangiri was the fifth presidential candidate to use his four-minute time to outline his plans on reducing bureaucracy in executive bodies. He said the current administration has managed to change the security-based approach to social issues and added that most of the Iranian people are not satisfied with municipalities and banks. The current first vice president said the establishment of an e-government was the major step to reduce bureaucracy.

Ebrahim Raisi said an electronic government would increase transparency and facilitate the administrative processes. Rouhani said some media outlets undermine the social capital in the country. In this segment, Ghalibaf questioned the reason behind Jahangiri's candidacy, implying that Jahangiri has only registered to support Rouhani.

Jahangiri said forceful measures would fail to solve social problems and added that he took part in the presidential election as a representative of the Reformist camp. The current first vice president emphasized that the 11th administration has managed to increase petrochemical production by nine million tonnes.

==== Environmental challenges ====
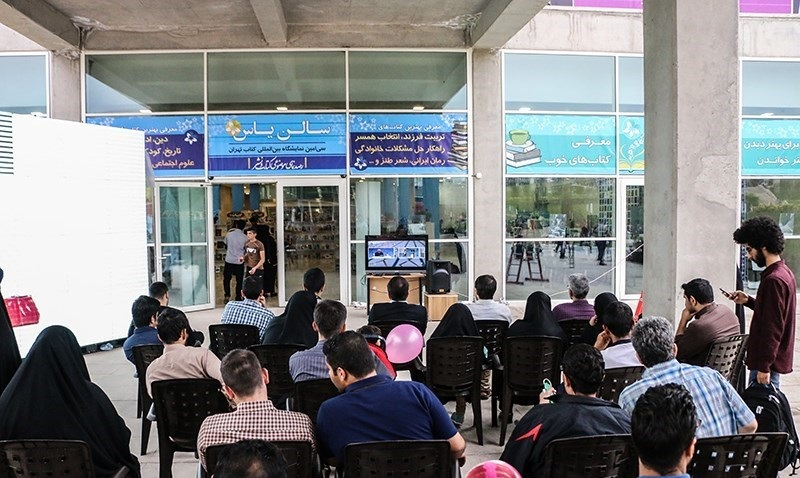
People watching debate at Tehran International Book Fair

Mohammad Bagher Ghalibaf was the last hopeful taking to the podium to answer a question about his plans to tackle the environmental challenges if elected president. He said the dust storm problem is currently plaguing 20 Iranian provinces and added that inappropriate measures taken inside the country has led to this crisis.

Jahangiri said the current administration has succeeded in taking essential measures to solve the environmental problems. He added that 70 percent of the dust storm problem stems from reasons beyond Iran's borders.

Ghalibaf defended the performance of Tehran Municipality in the environment-protection sector, saying it has used garbage to generate power and produce compost. The mayor of Tehran added that over 20,000 hectares have been planted with trees around the capital.

With all the six candidates having taken to the podium, the moderator announced the end of the first section of the debate and called a break before the beginning of the second round.

==== Round 2 ====
In the second section, each candidate was given two minutes to answer a question raised by the moderator. Draws determined the candidate and the question that he answers.

Rouhani explained his plans to promote employment for women, saying his administration has managed to create 700,000 jobs for women. He added that women account for over 50 percent of university students in Iran.

As per the draw, Mir-Salim next responded to a question about his plans to solve the heavy traffic problem in big cities and said giving priority to public transport would be the best solution to the issue.

Jahangiri was asked about his plans to boost the social status of the elites. He highlighted the fact that Iranian elites have greatly increased the country's scientific ranking in the world.

Raisi responded to a question about his plans to promote the culture of sportsmanship and said winning medals in sports is very important for the country.

Ghalibaf and Hashemitaba also in turn provided answered to the questions posed to them. In this section Ghalibaf displayed a screenshot of the Iranian president's website which he claimed confirms his remarks about Rouhani's pledge during the previous campaign to create four million jobs.

==== Post-debate poll ====
Two days after the first round of presidential debates on April 28, an online poll indicated that First Vice President Eshaq Jahangiri attracted national attention, taking a lead over his fellow competitor, incumbent Hassan Rouhani, who is running for a second term.

According to the online poll, conducted by Tabnak news website and republished by Aftab Online on April 30, 42% of respondents believe Jahangiri took the most advantage of the debate. About 34% said Rouhani was the best, while 15% voiced support for Mohammad Bagher Ghalibaf. Other candidates, including Ebrahim Raisi, Mostafa Mirsalim representing the conservative Islamic Coalition Party and Mostafa Hashemitaba, a marginal pro-Reform competitor got the least attention from the public, the poll showed.

| Poll Source | Question | Hassan Rouhani | Mohammad Bagher Ghalibaf | Ebrahim Raisi | Eshaq Jahangiri |
| Poll Source | Question | Rouhani | Ghalibaf | Raisi | Jahangiri |
|---|---|---|---|---|---|
| ISPA | The most convincing? | 22% | 22% | 19% | 16% |
| ISPA | The most honest? | 22% | 20% | 17% | —N/a |
| ISPA | The most moral? | 27% | 11.5% | 25% | —N/a |

=== Second debate ===
2nd debate
- Date: 5 May 2017
- Time: 16:30 IRST
- Duration: 3 hours
- Venue: IRIB headquarters
- Location: Tehran, Iran
- Type: Debate
- Theme: Political issues
- Organised by: Islamic Republic of Iran Broadcasting; Election Campaign Monitoring Commission
- Filmed by: Channel One; IRINN
- Participants: Mohammad Bagher Ghalibaf; Mostafa Hashemitaba; Eshaq Jahangiri; Mostafa Mirsalim; Hassan Rouhani
- Footage: Youtube / Aparat.com
- Moderator: Morteza Heidari

==== Summary ====
Morteza Heidari, as in the first round, was the moderator today.

==== Scientific progress ====
Ghalibaf was drawn first to answer a question about scientific progress in the country and his plans to boost it. He said cultural issues are the root of economic issues in the country, suggesting that the current officials in the education ministry cannot be relied upon to carry out their responsibilities.

Presidential candidates took turns to express their views on Ghalibaf's remarks with Rouhani saying that it is necessary to build cultural infrastructure for promoting the cultural status of the country. Mostafa Hashemitaba said faculty members of universities must only focus on educating students. Jahangiri also said serious measures must be taken to improve teachers' livelihood. Raeisi criticized the fall in the pace of Iran's scientific progress in the recent years.

==== Interaction with critics ====
Mostafa Mir-Salim, the second hopeful taking to the podium, was asked to outline his approaches for interacting with other political parties. He said embracing criticism is the only way for any administration's success. He criticized the 11th administration for failing to embrace criticism and insulting critics. Mir-Salim said lack of criticism means that the people are not willing to play a role in the country's progress.

Hashemitaba said some media outlets have targeted the 11th administration with the harshest of attacks. Jahangiri also said everybody must welcome constructive criticism and added that the current administration was successful in handling critics and promoting social liberties. Ebrahim Raisi also said the administration of President Hassan Rouhani has attacked its critics and used insulting expressions in response to them.

Mir-Salim once again took to the podium to answer the candidates' questions and said the current administration has not been successful in helping the realization of citizenship rights.

==== Nuclear rights ====
Ebrahim Raisi, the third candidate at the podium, used his four-minute time to express his plans to prevent any violation of Iran's nuclear rights. He said the 2015 nuclear agreement, known as the Joint Comprehensive Plan of Action (JCPOA), signed between Iran and the P5+1 group of countries, the five permanent members of the UN Security Council plus Germany, must be respected by all involved parties. He added that negative signals were sent to the opposite side during the nuclear negotiations. Raisi said the incumbent president had promised that all sanctions would be removed after the JCPOA conclusion but this has not happened.

Ghalibaf said the JCPOA has failed either to solve Iran's economic problems or improve people's livelihood. Mir-Salim said the nuclear agreement proved to the world that Iran does not seek to develop nuclear weapons. Rouhani said the presidential candidates must clearly inform the Iranian people of their plans concerning the JCPOA and interact with the world. He added that the JCPOA has led to the removal of all nuclear-related sanctions and emphasized that Iran would be exporting 200,000 barrels of oil per day if the JCPOA had not been reached. Jahangiri said the nuclear agreement was one of the greatest achievements in Iran's history and added that Iran's oil exports would have stopped if the deal were not reached.

Raisi said the JCPOA has failed to end Iran's economic recession and remove all banking sanctions but added that all Iranian administrations must be committed to the nuclear agreement. Ghalibaf retook the podium to answer the candidates' questions and said smuggling has caused the most major problems for the economy.

==== Foreign policy ====
Mostafa Hashemitaba, the fourth candidate taking to the podium, answered a debate question about his most important priorities of the foreign policy. He said different governments must be dealt with in different ways and added that the country must appear strong in the face of elements that take orders from the Israeli regime and arrogant powers. Hashemitaba also said Iran must take every step to strengthen the country's defense sector.

Jahangiri said the country must make the most of public diplomacy at the international level. The current vice president added that tourism, arts and sports are major fields for interaction with other nations. He emphasized that Iran's soft power must increase in parallel with its hard power. Raisi said Iran must pursue a strong economic diplomacy in its relations with other countries. He stressed the importance of protecting the rights of the Iranian citizens in all countries. ]Ghalibaf said the country must use all forms of diplomacy in its interactions with others and added that the 11th administration lacks coherence with regard to international trade. Rouhani said his administration brought about the realization of the country's rights in the nuclear negotiations with the P5+1 group of countries through a powerful diplomacy.

Hashemitaba said Iran can use its energy exports to cement relations with other countries and added that exports are a major factor in implementing Resistance Economy. He emphasized that necessary guarantees must be given to investors to attract investment.

==== Defense and national security ====
Eshaq Jahangiri took the podium, as the fifth candidate, to explain his plans to boost Iran's defense power and national security. He said a president needs to have experience in dealing with domestic and international issues and expressed disapproval of the fact that Iran's cultural power has not taken advantage of properly.

The presidential candidates took turns to express their views on Jahangiri's remarks with Ebrahim Raisi saying that the Iranian people's presence was the most important component of national might. Mostafa Mir-Salim said the current administration reduced the research budget to below 0.5 percent. Rouhani said Iran is currently considered as a big power in the region and the world, adding that the Islamic Republic's international standing has been greatly improved in comparison with the past.

Jahangiri used his five-minute time to answer the questions raised by other candidates and said Iran's culture was the most important source of the country's power.

==== Iranian-Islamic lifestyle ====
Last but not least Hassan Rouhani took to the podium to answer a question about promoting Iranian-Islamic lifestyle. He said the Iranian people must choose between a totalitarian administration and an administration promoting freedoms. He added that Iran's president belongs to all people.

The presidential candidates took turns to express their views on Rouhani's remarks with Jahangiri saying that the improving of lifestyles would reduce excessive use of the country's resources. Raisi said the optimal use of resources and the promotion of national unity are the major components of an Iranian-Islamic lifestyle. Ghalibaf said cultural affairs must be managed by cultural figures. The mayor of Tehran added that cultural activities have greatly advanced in the capital in recent years. Mir-Salim, meanwhile, criticized the 11th administration for failing to promote an Iranian-Islamic lifestyle.

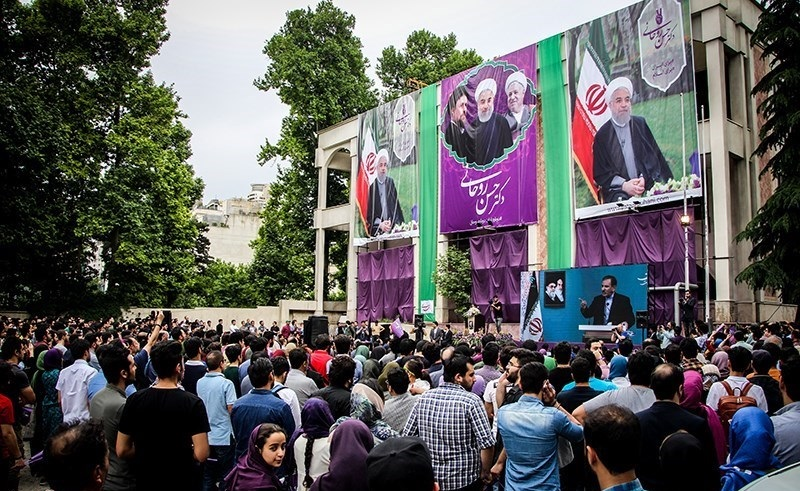
See debate in Tehran

In response to the allegations against his administration, the incumbent president said some candidates are giving empty promises on economic growth to the Iranians.

With all the six candidates having taken to the podium, the moderator announced the end of the first section of the debate and called a break before the beginning of the second round.

==== Round 2 ====
In the second section, each candidate was given two minutes to answer a question raised by the moderator. Draws determined the candidate and the question posed to him.

Jahangiri, going first, explained his plans to use arts to boost cultural potentialities and said no unlawful limitation must be imposed on artistic activities.

As per the draw, Mohammad Bagher Ghalibaf next responded to a question about his plans to boost the training aspect of the education system in the country and said some officials are willing to use foreign investment more than domestic potentialities.

Mir-Salim was asked about his plans to boost cooperation among the three branches of the government. He said all branches of the government must cooperate to solve the country's problems. He added that close cooperation is needed between the executive and legislative branches.

Hashemitaba, for his part, responded to a question about his plans to manage cyberspace. He said problematic cyberspace content must be controlled.

Rouhani answered a question about his plans to promote non-extravagant lifestyles and said the previous administration wasted billions of people's assets due to its carelessness. He added that his administration seeks to implement the transparency law.

Raisi, the last candidate speaking in this part, explained his plans about the ways to improve teachers' living standards and said the necessary facilities must be provided to elevate the scientific level of teachers. He added that due attention must be paid to improving the livelihood of teachers.

The final segment of the debate concerned the candidates' concluding remarks in which they offered a recap of their points, plans, agendas as well as their final statements in the time allotted to them so that all of the hopefuls would have had equal speaking time.

==== Reactions ====
Foreign policy has traditionally come second to domestic issues in Iranian presidential elections. Yet ever since the 2013 presidential election, foreign policy debates have come to the fore. Four years before, Hassan Rouhani ran for president with a symbolic key to open the doors to resolve Iran's mainly economic challenges. During the 2013 election, Rouhani argued that many difficulties were rooted in the country's foreign policy, declaring that it's time for foreign policy to serve Iran's economy. He also said in yet another highly symbolic sentence that the spinning of uranium enrichment centrifuges is valuable once the economy's wheels also spin. Therefore, his foreign policy agenda focused on resolving both the nuclear issue and easing tensions with Iran's Arab neighbors. Nonetheless, resolving the nuclear issue through engagement with six world powers came first, paying off with the signing of the 2015 JCPOA deal. Despite the criticisms at the debate, Rouhani is believed to have a stronger foreign policy than the opponents.

Another notable development during the debate was that Mostafa Hashemitaba who joined Rouhani and Jahangiri in defending the incumbent moderate administration. Meanwhile, conservative candidates Raisi and Mostafa Mir-Salim who both were soft-spoken in the first debate April 28, harshly criticized Rouhani and his government. Reformist Abdollah Naseri said that Raisi had set in motion a clear competition with Ghalibaf, whom observers say sought to portray himself as the main conservative candidate in the first debate.

==== Post-debate poll ====
| Poll Source | Question | Hassan Rouhani | Ebrahim Raisi | Mohammad Bagher Ghalibaf | Eshaq Jahangiri | Mostafa Mir-Salim | Mostafa Hashemitaba |
| Poll Source | Question | Rouhani | Raisi | Ghalibaf | Jahangiri | Mir-Salim | Hashemitaba |
|---|---|---|---|---|---|---|---|
| ISPA | The most successful? | 32.7% | 24.9% | 26.8% | 8.9% | 6.4% | 0.3% |
| ISPA | Winner? | 35.3% | 21.2% | 20.5% | 6.2% | 2.9% | 1% |

=== Third debate ===
3rd debate
- Date: 12 May 2017
- Time: 16:30 IRST
- Duration: 3 hours
- Venue: IRIB headquarters
- Location: Tehran, Iran
- Type: Debate
- Theme: Economical issues
- Organised by: Islamic Republic of Iran Broadcasting; Election Campaign Monitoring Commission
- Filmed by: Channel One; IRINN
- Participants: Mohammad Bagher Ghalibaf; Mostafa Hashemitaba; Eshaq Jahangiri; Mostafa Mirsalim; Hassan Rouhani
- Footage: Aparat.com
- Moderator: Morteza Heidari

==== Summary ====
Upon entering the headquarters of the Islamic Republic of Iran Broadcasting, the venue of the debate, Mohammad Bagher Ghalibaf said the implementation of any economic plan will affect the interests of the "four-percent" minority, a term he has been using throughout his campaigning to refer to the unfair distribution of wealth and opportunities in the country. He also expressed hope that candidates would focus on economic issues in the debate and not digress from the issue at hand.

In an interview prior to his participation in the debate, Mostafa Mir-Salim said the economic debate would be more important than the two previous televised clashes due to the fact that the major problem of Iranians concerns economic woes, adding that the issue is more acute for the youths.

Ebrahim Raisi said in interview before the debates that Iranians want to learns two things, one is the performance of the incumbent administration and the other is the candidates' agendas. He, too, stressed that the main concern of the people is economic issues. He cited the closure of factories, the impoverished people, workers, villagers and those involved in the production sector as some of the areas of concern.

Also speaking prior to partaking in the debate, Incumbent President Hassan Rouhani said Iranian people expect that the candidates set out their backgrounds in economic issues and explain what they have done. He added that the hopefuls must also lay out the resources that they have in mind for the implementation of their economic agendas, how they plan to fund them and how much inflation would be caused.

==== Smuggling and imports ====
The debate begins in earnest with Eshaq Jahangiri drawn first to answer a question about his plans to fight smuggling and reduce imports. He said the smuggling of commodities undermines domestic production and diverts the course of economy from the right course. He added that the oversight in dealing with the smuggling of goods has dealt severe blows to the country's economy.

Presidential candidates took turns to express their views on Jahangiri's remarks with Raeisi saying that the backbone of his anti-smuggling plan is based on extensive research conducted in universities. He added that the 11th administration was not serious in dealing with the smuggling of goods. Mostafa Hashemitaba said that 114 official docks have been used to smuggle goods into country.

Mohammad Bagher Ghalibaf said prevention is the first step in fighting goods smuggling and added that some cabinet ministers are engaged in illegal import of commodities to the country. Rouhani said the first concern with regard to the smuggling is its root causes. He added that the private sector's economic activities must be encouraged to reduce smuggling and emphasized that border villages must start producing and exporting goods in order to curb smuggling.

Jahangiri retook the podium to answer the candidates' questions and said the judiciary has appeared weak in fighting the smuggling of goods. He added that the current administration has taken serious measures to stop astronomical salaries. The Iranian first vice president said Tehran Municipality has not come clean on the selling of underpriced properties to certain people.

==== Oil dependence ====
Mostafa Mir-Salim, the second hopeful taking to the podium, was asked to outline his approaches to boosting exports and reducing the country's dependence on oil. He said he plans to reduce crude oil sales in favor of exporting domestic products. He added that the sales of crude oil have made the country more dependent on other countries and added that exports must be encouraged to make up for expensive production inside the country.

The presidential contestants took turns to express their views on Mir-Salim's remarks with Rouhani saying that his administration has managed to open Iran's export markets through the signing and implementation of the landmark 2015 nuclear deal, known as the Joint Comprehensive Plan of Action (JCPOA). He added that if the country does not exploit shared energy fields, the neighboring states will extract their oil reserves. Jahangiri said the 11th administration has considerably reduced the export of raw materials. Ebrahim Raisi said the building of refineries in various provinces would reduce crude oil sales and criticized that no measure has been carried out in this regard. He added that there is currently no serious will to fight the smuggling of goods in the country. Hashemitaba said export-oriented domestic production would help reduce the smuggling of goods. Ghalibaf said people with vested interest in smuggling have prevented solving the problem.

Mir-Salim retook the podium to respond to the candidates' questions, saying Iran must work with its neighboring countries to safeguard shared energy fields. He added that the administration of President Rouhani has failed to use the JCPOA to boost Iran's foreign trade. He stressed the importance of the access to modern technology in order to improve exports.

==== Banking issues ====
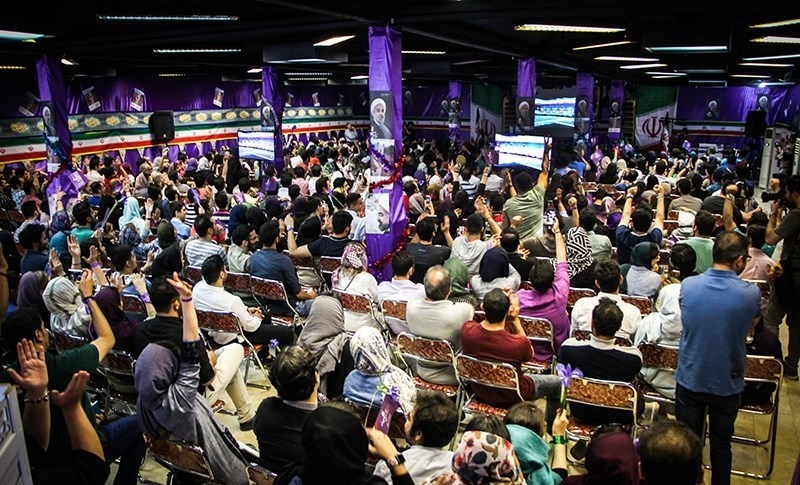
Rouhani supporters watching debate

Hassan Rouhani, the third candidate at the podium, used his four-minute time to express his plans to solve the problems in the country's banking system. He said Iran's banking system needs fundamental reforms. The incumbent president added that his administration has managed to double the capital of state-run banks to get more active in the economic sector.

The presidential candidates took turns to express their views on Rouhani's remarks with Jahangiri saying the previous administration had brought about the depletion of bank resources. He added that his administration is implementing the development plan for banks to help them become active in production. Raisi said the 11th administration blames its predecessor for all of the problems. Raisi added that the current administration has left the country in limbo for four years. Mostafa Hashemitaba said the banking problems were handed down to the 11th administration by its predecessor. Mohammad Bagher Ghalibaf said the administration of President Rouhani has failed in properly supervising and managing banks and added that liquidity has tripled under the present administration. Mostafa Mir-Salim said the banking system is currently based on usury, adding that the 11th administration is required to be more serious in dealing with the banking problems.

Rouhani retook to the podium to use his five-minute time to answer the debate question. He asked why the judiciary has not dealt with financial problems caused by the previous administration. The incumbent president said his administration has greatly reduced bank arrears and put banks back to the right course.

==== Domestic production ====
Mostafa Hashemitaba, the fourth candidate taking to the podium, answered a debate question about his plans for prosperity of domestic production. He said the modernization of the agriculture sector should be the first step for bringing prosperity to domestic production. He said the export-oriented production, investment attraction and bank reforms are other needed steps in this regard and added that domestic capital must be used to promote Iran's exports.

The presidential hopefuls took turn to express their views about Hashemitaba's comments with Mohammad Bagher Ghalibaf saying the current production problems are rooted in the mismanagement of the country's affairs. Mir-Salim said many production problems are a result of the administration's inattention to the economic recession. Rouhani said production prosperity needs further investment and a proper use of technology. Eshaq Jahangiri said the private sector is the key to production and investment in the country and added that the 11th administration has succeeded in bringing stability back to the Iranian economy. Raisi said 250,000 businesses shut down under the current administration.

Hashemitaba retook to the podium to use his five-minute time to give responses to the candidates' question, saying the country's industry will fail if it is not export-oriented. He added that many businesses shut down due to the worn-out technology used in them. He said some media outlets undermine any step taken to attract foreign investment.

==== Subsidies ====
As the fifth candidate taking to the podium, Ebrahim Raisi explained his plans for the implementation of the subsidies law. He said the 11th administration's policies have led to increasing poverty inside the country and added that subsidies handed out to lower deciles must increase.

The presidential contenders took turns to express their views on Raisi's remarks with Hashemitaba, saying the incumbent administration has been successful in containing inflation. Ghalibaf said entrepreneurs were under tremendous pressure as a result of the country's economic problems. Mir-Salim said domestic production has been damaged over the past four years. Rouhani said some people are willing to revive methods used by the previous administration and urged the continuation of cash handouts and the implementation of social security plan. Jahangiri said the existing problems are a result of wrong policies adopted by the previous administration and added that increasing cash handouts would destroy the country's economy.

Raisi retook to the podium to answer the candidates' questions in five minutes. He expressed his readiness to hold a one-on-one debate with Rouhani on his wrong policies.

==== Economic growth ====
Tehran Mayor Mohammad Bagher Ghalibaf took to the podium to answer a question in four minutes about his plans for boosting the country's economic growth. He said Iran is facing full-fledged economic crisis and added that President Hassan Rouhani's administration has not been successful in solving the country's economic crisis. The mayor of Tehran said tax evasion in Iran amounts to 40 percent, adding that the creation of job opportunities is the most important step for boosting the economic growth.

The presidential hopefuls took turns to express their views on Ghalibaf's remarks with Mir-Salim saying the Rouhani administration has failed to observe the principles of Economy of Resistance. Rouhani said Ghalibaf must explain his plans for achieving 26 percent economic growth rate. Eshaq Jahangiri said the candidates must explain if they are capable of attracting foreign investment. Raeisi said oil accounts for the lion's share of national seven percent economic growth rate. Hashemitaba also made comments on Ghalibaf's comments.

The mayor of Tehran retook to the podium to answer the debate questions, vowing that his administration will certainly create five million jobs, including 1.5 million jobs for rural districts, if elected. Ghalibaf said prosperity of the housing sector and tourism are among his main plans and added that it is possible to increase the country's revenue 2.5 times.

With all the six candidates having taken to the podium, the moderator announced the end of the first section of the debate and called a 15-minute break before the beginning of the second round.

==== Round 2 ====
In the second section, each candidate was given two minutes to answer a question raised by the moderator. Draws determined the candidate and the question posed to him. Ghalibaf, going first, explained his plans to boost productivity in the agriculture sector and said Iran must become self-sufficient in the production of vital agricultural products. He added that fighting corruption is a prerequisite for success in becoming self-sufficient. As per the draw, Ebrahim Raisi next responded to a question about his plans to fight economic corruption and said corrupt structures must be addressed by administration officials. He urged due sensitivity to handle the corruption cases. Mostafa Hashemitaba was asked about his plans to reform the taxation system and said the presidential candidates must clarify the sources used to fund their campaigns. He added that the tax revenues must be made transparent through a comprehensive tax system. Rouhani, for his part, responded to a question about his plans to stop the growth of liquidity. Eshaq Jahangiri answered a question about his plans to promote auto industry's quality. Mostafa Mir-Salim, the last candidate speaking in this part, explained his plans to help the growth of science-based businesses.

In the final segment of the debate, the six candidates offered their concluding remarks which was mainly a summary of their previous comments.

==== Post-debate poll ====
| Poll Source | Question | Hassan Rouhani | Ebrahim Raisi | Mohammad Bagher Ghalibaf | Eshaq Jahangiri | Mostafa Mir-Salim | Mostafa Hashemitaba |
| Poll Source | Question | Rouhani | Raisi | Ghalibaf | Jahangiri | Mir-Salim | Hashemitaba |
|---|---|---|---|---|---|---|---|
| ISPA | Winner? | 42.4% | 21.4% | 17.8% | 3.9% | 2.8% | 2% |

== Other programmes ==
| Candidate | Program title (Channel) | Time | Candidate | Program title (Channel) | Time |
|---|---|---|---|---|---|
| Mostafa Hashemitaba | With camera (IRIB1) | 26 April 2017, 22:00–22:45 | Mostafa Mir-Salim | With camera (IRIB1) | 1 May 2017, 22:00–22:45 |
| Mostafa Hashemitaba | Recorded conversation (IRINN) | 29 April 2017, 21:30–22:00; 11 May 2017, 21:30–22:00 | Mostafa Mir-Salim | Recorded conversation (IRINN) | 8 May 2017, 21:30–22:00; 14 May 2017, 21:30–22:00 |
| Mostafa Hashemitaba | Special conversation (IRIB2) | 4 May 2017, 22:45–23:30; 9 May 2017, 22:45–23:30 | Mostafa Mir-Salim | Special conversation (IRIB2) | 27 April 2017, 22:45–23:30; 17 May 2017, 22:45–23:30 |
| Mostafa Hashemitaba | Reply Experts (IRIB4) | 17 May 2017, 17:00–18:00 | Mostafa Mir-Salim | Reply Experts (IRIB4) | 11 May 2017, 17:00–18:00 |
| Mostafa Hashemitaba | Reply Youths (IRIB3) | 10 May 2017, 19:10–18:10 | Mostafa Mir-Salim | Reply Youths (IRIB3) | 15 May 2017, 19:10–18:10 |
| Mostafa Hashemitaba | Reply Iranian abroad (JJ1) | 30 April 2017, 00:30–01:30; 13 May 2017, 00:30–01:30 | Mostafa Mir-Salim | Reply Iranian abroad (JJ1) | 29 April 2017, 00:30–01:30; 16 May 2017, 00:30–01:30 |
| Mostafa Hashemitaba | Documentary (IRIB1) | 2 May 2017,18:30–19:00; 15 May 2017,22:00–22:30 | Mostafa Mir-Salim | Documentary (IRIB1) | 4 May 2017,18:30–19:00; 10 May 2017,22:00–22:30 |
| Ebrahim Raisi | With camera (IRIB1) | 30 April 2017, 22:00–22:45 | Hassan Rouhani | With camera (IRIB1) | 29 April 2017, 22:00–22:45 |
| Ebrahim Raisi | Recorded conversation (IRINN) | 10 May 2017, 21:30–22:00; 16 May 2017, 21:30–22:00 | Hassan Rouhani | Recorded conversation (IRINN) | 1 May 2017, 21:30–22:00; 13 May 2017, 21:30–22:00 |
| Ebrahim Raisi | Special conversation (IRIB2) | 26 April 2017, 22:45–23:30; 7 May 2017, 22:45–23:30 | Hassan Rouhani | Special conversation (IRIB2) | 3 May 2017, 22:45–23:30; 11 May 2017, 22:45–23:30 |
| Ebrahim Raisi | Reply Experts (IRIB4) | 17 May 2017, 18:00–19:00 | Hassan Rouhani | Reply Experts (IRIB4) | 14 May 2017, 18:00–19:00 |
| Ebrahim Raisi | Reply Youths (IRIB3) | 13 May 2017, 19:10–18:10 | Hassan Rouhani | Reply Youths (IRIB3) | 17 May 2017, 19:10–18:10 |
| Ebrahim Raisi | Reply Iranian abroad (JJ1) | 4 May 2017, 00:30–01:30; 15 May 2017, 00:30–01:30 | Hassan Rouhani | Reply Iranian abroad (JJ1) | 2 May 2017, 00:30–01:30; 10 May 2017, 00:30–01:30 |
| Ebrahim Raisi | Documentary (IRIB1) | 3 May 2017,18:30–19:00; 14 May 2017,22:00–22:30 | Hassan Rouhani | Documentary (IRIB1) | 6 May 2017,18:30–19:00; 9 May 2017,22:00–22:30 |
| Mohammad Bagher Ghalibaf | With camera (IRIB1) | 27 April 2017, 22:00–22:45 | Eshaq Jahangiri | With camera (IRIB1) | 2 May 2017, 22:00–22:45 |
| Mohammad Bagher Ghalibaf | Recorded conversation (IRINN) | 3 May 2017, 21:30–22:00; 15 May 2017, 21:30–22:00 | Eshaq Jahangiri | Recorded conversation (IRINN) | 7 May 2017, 21:30–22:00; 17 May 2017, 21:30–22:00 |
| Mohammad Bagher Ghalibaf | Special conversation (IRIB2) | 1 May 2017, 22:45–23:30; 13 May 2017, 22:45–23:30 | Eshaq Jahangiri | Special conversation (IRIB2) | 29 April 2017, 22:45–23:30; 15 May 2017, 22:45–23:30 |
| Mohammad Bagher Ghalibaf | Reply Experts (IRIB4) | 9 May 2017, 18:00–19:00 | Eshaq Jahangiri | Reply Experts (IRIB4) | 16 May 2017, 18:00–19:00 |
| Mohammad Bagher Ghalibaf | Reply Youths (IRIB3) | 17 May 2017, 23:30–00:30 | Eshaq Jahangiri | Reply Youths (IRIB3) | 5 May 2017, 23:30–00:30 |
| Mohammad Bagher Ghalibaf | Reply Iranian abroad (JJ1) | 7 May 2017, 00:30–01:30; 14 May 2017, 00:30–01:30 | Eshaq Jahangiri | Reply Iranian abroad (JJ1) | 9 May 2017, 00:30–01:30; 11 May 2017, 00:30–01:30 |
| Mohammad Bagher Ghalibaf | Documentary (IRIB1) | 8 May 2017,18:30–19:00; 11 May 2017,22:00–22:30 | Eshaq Jahangiri | Documentary (IRIB1) | 7 May 2017,18:30–19:00; 13 May 2017,22:00–22:30 |
