= 2025 Australian federal election debates and forums =

Several debates were held during the campaign for the 2025 Australian federal election between senior figures of the governing Australian Labor Party and the opposition Liberal Party of Australia. Additionally, debates were held between representatives of minor parties, and between ministers and their shadow counterparts.

== Leaders' debates ==
=== 8 April – Sky News and The Daily Telegraph People's Forum ===
The first leaders' debate took place on 8 April and was hosted by Sky News and The Daily Telegraph. The debate was held at the Wentworthville Leagues Club in Western Sydney. The two leaders were asked questions by moderators and by an audience of 100 undecided voters.

Albanese was declared the winner of the debate, receiving 44 votes, while Dutton received 35. 21 audience members were undecided. Both the Labor and Liberal social media accounts declared their leaders to have won the debate.

The Sky News debate had a viewership of 410,000.

=== 16 April – ABC News Leaders Debate ===
Albanese and Dutton debated again on 16 April on the ABC. It was hosted by David Speers. This was the first ABC Leaders Debate held without association with the National Press Club since 2007.

The ABC debate had a viewership of 1.7 million across broadcast TV and ABC iview.

=== 22 April – Channel 9 The Great Debate ===
Albanese and Dutton debated on 22 April on the Nine Network. This debate was moderated by A Current Affair host Ally Langdon and questions were asked of the two leaders by journalists from Nine Entertainment's media companies: Charles Croucher from 9News, Deb Knight from 2GB, and Phil Coorey from the Australian Financial Review. The panel decided in a split decision that the Opposition Leader narrowly won the debate.

The Channel 9 debate had a viewership of 2.1 million across broadcast TV and 9Now.

=== 27 April – 7NEWS The Final Showdown: Leaders' Debate ===
Albanese and Dutton debated on 27 April on the Seven Network. Seven News Political Editor Mark Riley was the moderator for the debate. Host of Sunrise Natalie Barr hosted the event. This was the last leaders debate before the 3 May election.

A panel of 60 undecided voters assembled by pollster Roy Morgan declared Albanese the overall winner of the debate with 50% of the votes, with Dutton winning 25% of the votes and 25% remaining undecided. Several other topics were also polled.

The Channel Seven debate had a viewership of 1,675,000.

== Other debates ==
=== 9 April – Sky News Treasurers' Debate ===
Sky News hosted a debate between treasurer Jim Chalmers and shadow treasurer Angus Taylor. It was hosted by Ross Greenwood.

=== 10 April – National Press Club Energy Debate ===
The National Press Club hosted minister for climate change and energy Chris Bowen, and his opposition counterpart Ted O'Brien for a debate on energy policies. The debate was hosted by Tom Connell.

=== 16 April – National Press Club Housing Debate ===
The National Press Club hosted the housing minister Clare O'Neil and shadow housing minister Michael Sukkar for a debate regarding housing policies.

=== 17 April — Housing Ministers Debate on 7.30 ===
On the ABC's 7.30 program, Sarah Ferguson interviewed O'Neil and Sukkar for a debate on housing policies.

=== 23 April — National Press Club Health Minister Debate ===
Mark Butler and Anne Ruston competed in a debate held by the National Press Club relating to health policies.

=== 23 April — Business debate ===
On 23 April a debate was co-hosted by the Business Council of Australia and the Council of Small Business Organisations Australia where Chalmers and Taylor debated alternative policies regarding business prosperity.

== Minor party debates ==
=== 6 News Debates ===
6 News Australia hosted four debates between minor party candidates for each state's candidates for the Senate.

Questions were asked of the following senators or candidates:

11 March Queensland

- Belinda Jones, from Legalise Cannabis
- Senator Gerard Rennick, from People First
- Senator Malcolm Roberts, from One Nation
- Jim Willmott, from Libertarian

12 March Victoria

- Jordan Dittloff, from Libertarian
- Fiona Patten, from Legalise Cannabis
- Warren Pickering, from One Nation
- Jordan van den Lamb, from Victorian Socialists

19 March South Australia

- Christopher Brohier, from Family First
- Jennifer Game, from One Nation
- Rex Patrick, from Jacqui Lambie Network
- Dianah Walter, from SA Matters

15 April New South Wales

- Miles Hunt, from Legalise Cannabis
- Craig Kelly, from the Libertarian Party
- Warwick Stacey, from One Nation
- Lyle Shelton, from Family First

28 April Western Australia

- Steve Klomp, from the Australian Christians
- Megan Krakouer, from Australia's Voice
- Jason Meotti, from Legalise Cannabis
- Elana Mitchell from the Australian Democrats

29 April Tasmania

- Chrysten Abraham, from the Libertarian Party
- Phillip Bigg, from the Shooters, Fishers and Farmers Party
- Matthew Owen, from Legalise Cannabis

==== Dickson debate ====
On 1 May, 6 News hosted a debate between candidates for the seat of Dickson where Peter Dutton, the leader of the Liberal party is the incumbent. Peter Dutton and the Labor challenger Ali France chose to skip the debate. Independent challenger Ellie Smith, and Vinnie Batten of the Greens did attend.

=== Paul Murray The Mavericks: Live Pub Test ===
Paul Murray from Sky News hosted The Mavericks: Live Pub Test debate on 14 April, featuring National Party of Australia senator Matt Canavan, Katter's Australian Party leader and member for Kennedy Bob Katter, and One Nation leader senator Pauline Hanson.

== See also ==
- Debate
- 2016 Australian federal election debates and forums
- 2019 Australian federal election debates and forums
- 2022 Australian federal election debates and forums
