= Isfahan City Center =

Shopping Mall on south of isfahan

- Location: Isfahan, Iran
- Coordinates: 32.5525°N 51.6900°E
- Address: Dastjerdi Hw.
- Opened: November 2012
- Developer: Prestige Land Iran | Masoud Sarrami and Mehdi Jahangiri
- Num. of stores: 700+
- Floor area: 776,500 square metres (8,358,000 sq ft)
- Floors: 7
- Parking: 5,500 car spaces
- Website: www.isfahancitycenter.com

Isfahan City Center is a large commercial and entertainment complex in Isfahan, Iran. As of October 2023, it is the second largest shopping mall after Iran Mall in Iran, and the fourth largest in the world.

== History ==
The mall was developed by Masoud Sarrami and MehdiJahangiri through his firm, Prestige Land Iran Co. he was confident that the venture would succeed, being cautiously hopeful in 2016 that the sanctions against Iran would eventually be lifted. He even toyed with the idea of attracting Donald Trump to invest in the hotel aspect of the project.

== Fadak City Center ==
Prestigeland opened another 6000 square meter Fadak Mall in North Center East of the city, it opened in 2021.

== Description ==
The mall was designed by the architect Medardo Cadiz of Cadiz International, Inc.

The mall is located near the city of Isfahan and the towns of Sepahan Shahr and Baharestan.

== Gallery ==
Entrance of Isfahan City Center

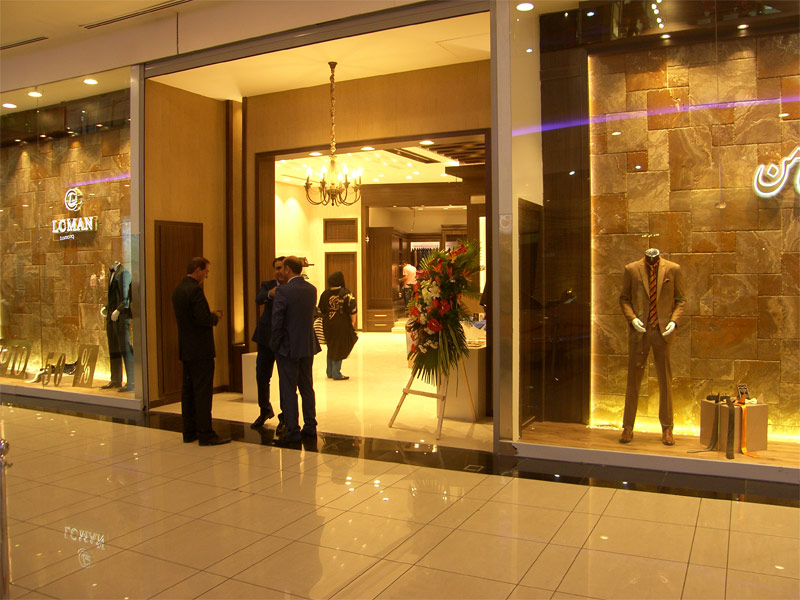
A store inside Isfahan City Center

A view of a lobby at Isfahan City Center

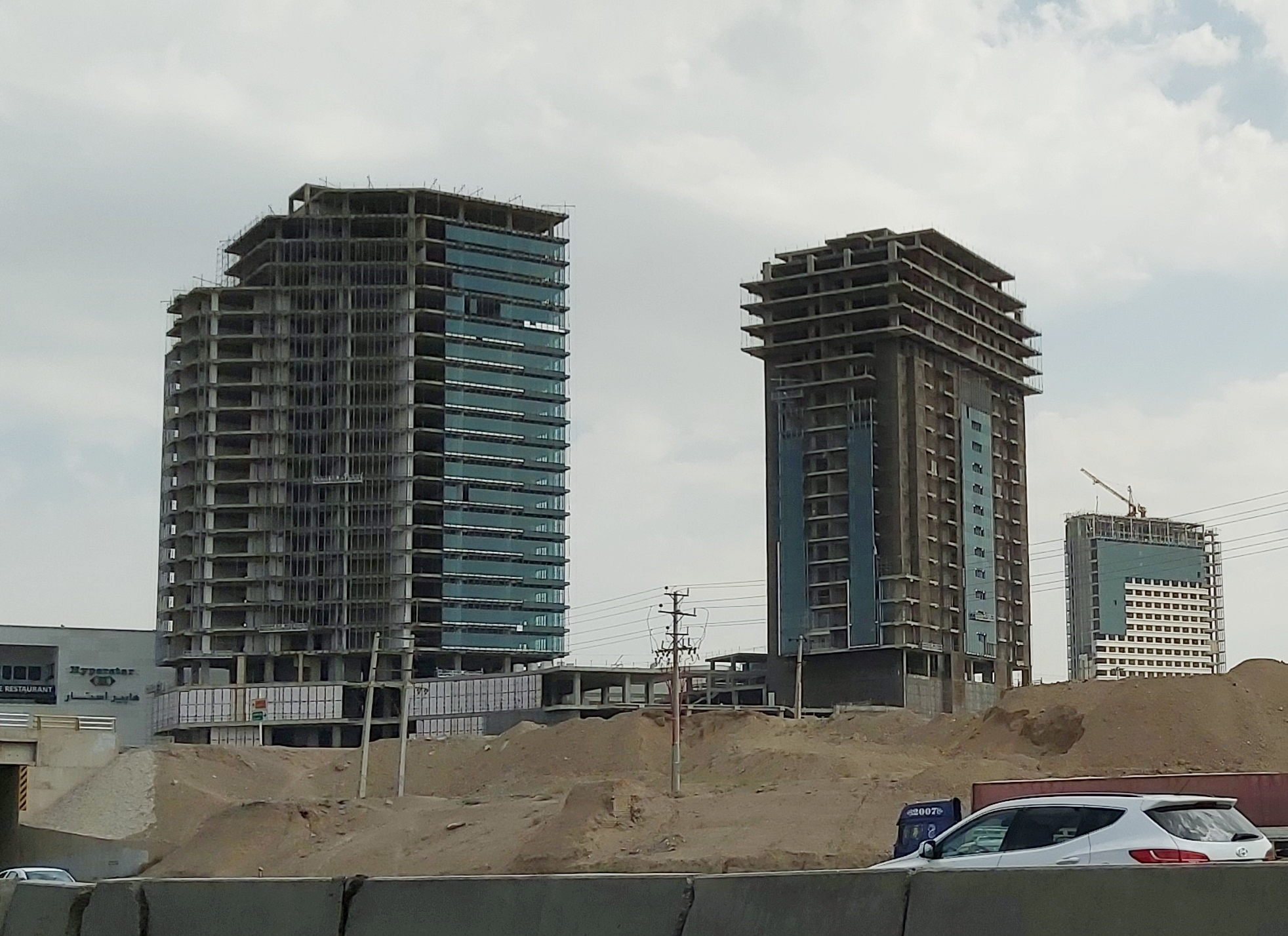
Isfahan City Center Towers

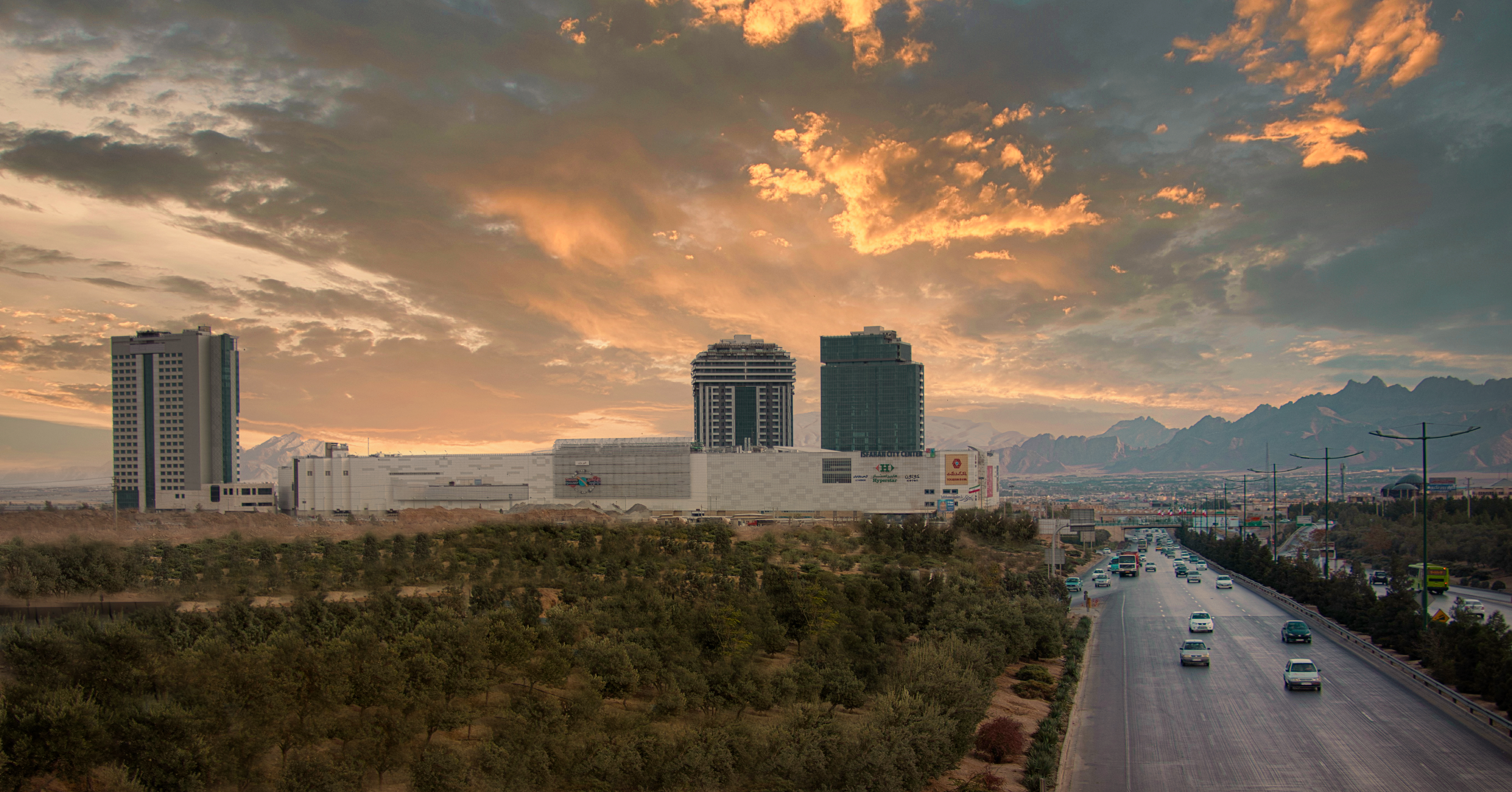

== See also ==
- List of largest shopping malls
