= 2013 Iranian presidential election debates =

The Iranian presidential election debates of 2013 was held from 31 May to 7 June. For the 2013 election, the IRIB has approved three televised debates with all candidates, different from last election's format which was person-by-person. For each question, one candidate was chosen randomly to give his response. Then, other candidates shared their ideas. The eight candidates have explained their cultural and political plans during debates. The debates were focused on such issues as the economy, foreign policy, and Iran's comprehensive talks with the P5+1 group (United Kingdom, China, France, Russia and the United States, plus Germany) over the country's nuclear energy program. More than 45,000,000 people world-wide watched the debates according to IRIB.

== Debate schedule ==
First presidential debate (economic policy)
Friday, May 31; IRIB
Moderator: Morteza Heidari
Video: telewebion Youtube
Transcripts: ISNA

Second presidential debate (cultural policy)
Wednesday, June 5; IRIB
Moderator: Morteza Heidari
Video: telewebion Youtube
Transcripts: ISNA

Third presidential debate (domestic and foreign policy)
Friday, June 7; IRIB
Moderator: Morteza Heidari
Video: telewebion Youtube
Transcripts: ISNA

== Debates ==
=== The first debate ===
مناظره انتخاباتی شماره ۱ Moderated by Channel 1
- Date: May 31, 2013
- Location: Jam Jam Valiasr Street Tehran
- Participants: Mohammad Reza Aref; Mohammad Bagher Ghalibaf; Mohammad Gharazi; Gholam-Ali Haddad-Adel; Saeed Jalili; Mohsen Rezaee; Hassan Rouhani; Ali Akbar Velayati

The first televised debate was held on May 31 at 4 PM UTC+4:30 in the Channel 1. All eight candidates were invited. The host of the first debates was Morteza Heidari. The first lottery was selected by a lottery based on a question that was answered within 3 minutes. Within 90 seconds of talk, then 7 others criticize him or his views were expressed. The selected person within 2 minutes to answer incoming criticism and the view was perfect.

==== Questions ====
- Mohammad Gharazi: The problem of how and to what extent, and how long the job will contain?
- Mohammad Reza Aref: System and your applications to interact with other forces and what the regulatory bodies?
- Mohsen Rezaee: What is your government's plan to provide housing and curb prices?
- Hassan Rouhani: The government plans to extend to you and what would be the measure of economic justice?
- Gholam-Ali Haddad-Adel: Your government's plan to deal with the loss of oil revenues in the first year is coming?
- Mohammad Bagher Ghalibaf: Your plan to boost national production and working capital to support Iran?
- Saeed Jalili: The second step subsides is how targeted subsidies law and what measures are you running?
- Ali Akbar Velayati: What is your government's action plan to curb inflation?

At the end of the round, each candidate paid within 90 seconds, to sum up, his views.

Themes
Economics, Inflation, Subsidies, Purchasing power
Housing, Land reform, Unemployment, Economic sanctions

=== The second debate ===
مناظره انتخاباتی شماره ۲ Moderated by Channel 1
- Date: June 6, 2013
- Location: Jam Jam Valiasr Street Tehran
- Participants: Mohammad Reza Aref; Mohammad Bagher Ghalibaf; Mohammad Gharazi; Gholam-Ali Haddad-Adel; Saeed Jalili; Mohsen Rezaee; Hassan Rouhani; Ali Akbar Velayati

The second televised debate took place on June 5 on Channel 1. Morteza Heidari also hosted the second debate.

==== Format change ====
The second and third sections (test questions and pictures slide) was removed for the second and third debates and the time of answering was changed up to seven minutes. Designing of the program was also changed. Save the time he also was added to the system, regardless of where each candidate could have the opportunity to criticize others and save time for other questions.

==== Questions ====
- Gholam-Ali Haddad-Adel: Appendix cultural or economic development projects in preparation of what is necessary?, What is the most important step for the development of hijab and modesty?
- Saeed Jalili: Your act of vast potential artists against cultural war is what?, Do you believe the most vulnerable socio-cultural practices that strengthen families and threaten what will your government do this?
- Hassan Rouhani: Effective action to promote and develop tourism in the country you're in, what would it be?, Your state what measures they can to protect the rights and personal privacy?
- Ali Akbar Velayati: What is your plan for more joys and fun in the community?, What is the most important step for sports development?
- Mohammad Gharazi: The most urgent government action to solve health problems in the community, what would you have?, How are you and how much the government liberation theorizing on society and especially in universities will promote?
- Mohammad Reza Aref: How you will organize cyberspace internet spaces?, Your government will act immediately to facilitate the marriage?
- Mohsen Rezaee: You look at the task of the national media and the public demands what?, What is the most effective action you addicted to the problem?
- Mohammad Bagher Ghalibaf: What's your government's plan for social life and an Iranian-Islamic society?, The most important action for the promotion and expansion of veterans who will be testifying?

==== Reactions ====
After Rouhani named Mohammad-Reza Shajarian as the cultural ambassador of the Iranian people, it was given the vast in the social media. Gharazi was also more focused on the media. Jalili's instrumental piece Zarfiyat was also joked and his cultural views were heavily criticized.

Themes
Cultural affairs, Healthcare system, Social media, Women's Rights
Human Rights, Security, Censorship, Education, Infrastructure

=== The third debate ===
مناظره انتخاباتی شماره ۳ Moderated by Channel 1
- Date: June 8, 2013
- Location: Jam Jam Valiasr Street Tehran
- Participants: Mohammad Reza Aref; Mohammad Bagher Ghalibaf; Mohammad Gharazi; Gholam-Ali Haddad-Adel; Saeed Jalili; Mohsen Rezaee; Hassan Rouhani; Ali Akbar Velayati

The third and last televised debate took place on June 5 in the Channel 1. The host of debates remains unchanged. This debate passionately than the other two debates had. The conflict between Mohammad Bagher Ghalibaf and Hassan Rouhani about July 1999 student protest was one of the main subjects of the debate. They also discuss Syrian civil war and Arab spring. Independent Mohammad Gharazi also criticized conservatives and reformists mutuality with each other.

==== Questions ====
- Mohsen Rezaee: Are your government support the Islamic awakening movement as a specific program?, Whether or not you continue provincial trips in your government?
- Mohammad Gharazi: If sanctions on Iran for its nuclear program and nuclear challenges before the situation can be explained by what?, Given the importance of social and personal freedoms stipulated in the constitution, limits and boundaries of what is freedom? What difference do you think between liberty and freedom in the Muslim community in Western secular society there?
- Mohammad Reza Aref: Your government's action plan to combat Islamophobia and Iranophobia is induced by a system of domination is?, What is your strategy for using the experiences and achievements of previous administrations?
- Hassan Rouhani: What is the difference between real and fake criticism review?, The most important legacy of Imam Khomeini in your idea and how you will use this capacity in their programs?
- Gholam-Ali Haddad-Adel: America can do nothing. Do you believe it?, Iranian independence literally and avoid any foreign interference in the administration of the valuable achievements of the Islamic Revolution. The continued pressure control system or create new constraints, how ready?
- Ali Akbar Velayati: In your opinion, is the difference between personal or institutional or legal powers? To what extent are committed to the unity and strength of complying with any of your circumstances, you know?, Do you accept the authorities of the President?
- Mohammad Bagher Ghalibaf: During the past two years, global satellite networks that are external IR, the United States has been interrupted by any legal means. Why do you think these measures, despite claims to the domination of the free flow of information and freedom of expression mean?, Today, Iran is one of the powers in the Middle East, what's your plans for this valency such as chairing the Non-Alignment Movement?
- Saeed Jalili: How do you assess 9th Dey movement?, Your plans for resolving international conflicts such as Syria, Afghanistan, Iraq, Bahrain and Palestine?

==== Reactions ====
Ali Akbar Salehi, Iran's Foreign minister said that Iran's policies about Nuclear programs will not be changed despite anyone will be elected as the president, According to the candidates' ideologies about it.

Themes
Domestic policies, Foreign relations, Democracy, Islamism, Secularism
Nuclear program, Relations with Parliament, NGOs and Political parties, Freedom of speech

== Polls for Debates Winner ==
The following polls are held right after each debate in order to define the debate winner.

=== Debate 1 (31 May 2013) ===
Poll source	Date updated	Total votes	Jalili	Haddad	Rezaee	Rouhani	Aref	Gharazi	Ghalibaf	Velayati
Isna	31 May 2013	13,986	6.2%	0.4%	10.8%	15.2%	50.5%	3.1%	11.1%	2.8%
Entekhab	1 June 2013	40,269	4.44%	0.5%	9.36%	26.19%	40.93%	3.68%	11.62%	3.28%
Asriran	1 June 2013	76,062	3.9%	0.5%	12.29%	29.39%	30.44%	2.92%	14.88%	3.68%

=== Debate 2 (5 June 2013) ===
Poll source	Date updated	Total votes	Jalili	Haddad	Rezaee	Rouhani	Aref	Gharazi	Ghalibaf	Velayati
Entekhab	7 June 2013	39,206	5.6%	0.9%	9.33%	53.6%	19.69%	3.04%	6.15%	2.23%
Parsineh	7 June 2013	17,917	11.08%	2%	12.27%	37.91%	16.19%	3.72%	12.49%	4.34%
Asriran	7 June 2013	73,572	3.77%	1.13%	12.8%	55.46%	15.7%	2.87%	6.25%	2.03%
Fararu	7 June 2013	35,535	5.09%	1.21%	9.71%	44.83%	24.31%	3.64%	9.04%	2.17%

=== Debate 3 (7 June 2013) ===
Poll source	Date updated	Total votes	Jalili	Haddad	Rezaee	Rouhani	Aref	Gharazi	Ghalibaf	Velayati
Entekhab	9 June 2013	67,973	5.97%	1.01%	6.45%	57.28%	17.35%	2.19%	3.97%	5.78%
Khabaronline	9 June 2013	41,000	6%	1%	8%	44%	21%	%3	5%	12%
Asriran	9 June 2013	101,220	4.27%	1.23%	9.86%	55.34%	15.41%	3.29%	4.31%	6.28%
Fararu	9 June 2013	50,666	5.06%	1.1%	5.95%	52.97%	19.38%	2.96%	5.58%	7%

== Other programs ==
Broadcasting schedules
Channel	Program name	Hour	
Channel	Program name	Main	Replay
Channel 1	With Cammera	8:00 PM	—N/a
Channel 2	Exclusive Interview News	10:45 PM	—N/a
Jame Jam 1	Response to the Iranian Diaspora	11:30 PM	—N/a
Channel 1	First documented	8:10 PM	11:30 PM
Channel 3	Questions from youths	7:10 PM	—N/a
Channel 1	Second documented	8:10 PM	11:30 PM
IRINN	Recorded conversation	11:30 PM	—N/a
Channel 4	Questions from experts	6:10 PM	—N/a
