= Akbar Hashemi Rafsanjani 2013 presidential campaign =

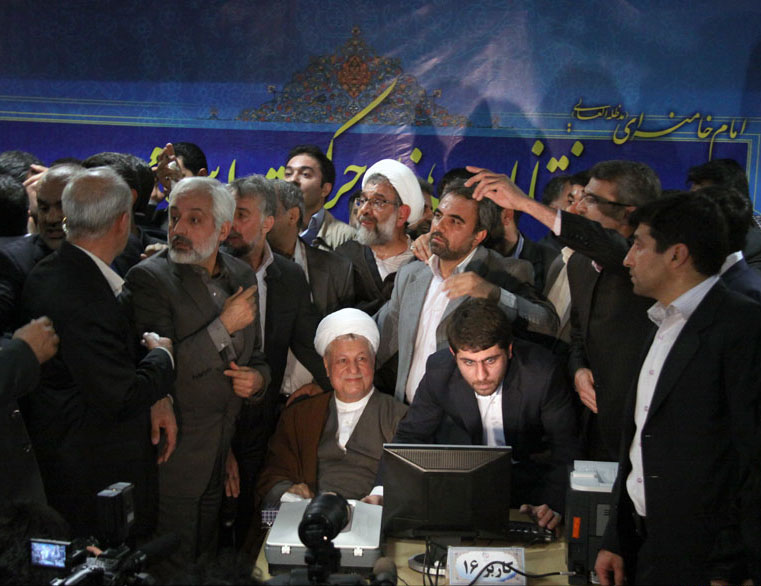
- Campaign: 2013 Iranian presidential election
- Candidate: Akbar Hashemi Rafsanjani; Chairman of the Assembly of Experts 2007-2011; President of Iran 1989-1997; Chairman of the Parliament 1980-1989; Minister of Interior 1979-1980
- Affiliation: Executives of Construction Party (Reformism)
- Headquarters: Tehran, Iran
- Key people: Eshagh Jahangiri (Manager); Ali Abdolalizadeh (Vice-manager); Majid Ansari; Ali Younesi; Ali Rabiee; Abbas Akhoundi; Mohammad Reza Sadegh; Safdar Hosseini; Mohammad Ali Najafi; Hossein Mahjoub

Website
- www.hashemirafsanjani.ir

Akbar Hashemi Rafsanjani (Persian: ‌اکبر هاشمی رفسنجانی, Akbar Hāshemī Rafsanjānī, Hashemi Bahramani هاشمی بهرمانی) served as the fourth president of Iran from 1989 until 1997.

On 11 May 2013 he entered the race for the June 2013 presidential election. "I came to serve. It is the right of the people to choose me or not," Iranian media quoted him as saying as he registered. Rafsanjani signalled few days before registration that he would not run without Khamenei's consent. It was unclear on Saturday whether the supreme leader had in fact intervened in the final hours before registration drew to a close. As early consequences merchants cut prices as the slumping Iranian currency clawed back about 4 percent against the U.S. dollar.

A few days after his registration, a group of hardline Iranian lawmakers, about 100 out of 290 parliamentarians, has urged the country's constitutional watchdog to disqualify Hashemi Rafsanjani and Esfandiar Rahim Mashaei.

On 21 May Hashemi Rafsanjani was barred from standing for president by the Guardian Council.

== Registration ==
The emergence of two-term former president Ali Akbar Hashemi Rafsanjani and Ahmadinejad’s top aide, Esfandiar Rahim Mashaei, dramatically changed the landscape of an election that until recently most observers thought would be fought between conservative candidates loyal to Iran’s supreme leader, Ayatollah Ali Khamenei. Amid tight security, Rafsanjani made his way through the crowd to the registration center. As he arrived at the designated desk, it became clear that Mashaei, flanked by Ahmadinejad, was registering simultaneously just a few feet away. "I came to serve. It is the right of the people to choose me or not.", Rafsanjani said. Rafsanjani endorsed the opposition Green Movement during the last election in 2009, when Mahmoud Ahmadinejad, the outgoing president, won a disputed contest.

== Endorsements ==
Mohammad Khatami, former president of Iran supported Rafsanjani to sign on for election. In response to calls to nominate himself, Khatami issued a statement on his website, saying, "Even if we get a chance to run in the election, we won’t have the right to receive more than a certain number of votes". Khatami said: "He is the most suitable person who is able to solve complicated problems of the country".

Reformist presidential hopeful Mohammad Shariatmadari withdrew his candidacy from the presidential elections in support of former president Ali Akbar Hashemi Rafsanjani.

Pro-reform Islamic Iran Participation Front and the Mojahedin of the Islamic Revolution of Iran Organization whose many members were arrested and jailed because of protests after the previous presidential election in 2009 have declared they will support Ayatollah Akbar Hashemi Rafsanjani in the 2013 presidential election. The Islamic Revolution Mojahedin Organization front has said in a statement that "the gap between the government and the public has reached its peak, so that distrust toward the administration has never been so high."

Ali Mazrooei, former parliamentarian supported him and said: "Rafsanjani will be able to get most of the votes at the elections, because he, among other candidates, will succeed the most at improving the current situation in Iran".

List of individuals and political parties endorsing Akbar Hashemi Rafsanjani
- Mohammad Khatami, Former President of Iran
- Ali Motahari, Member of the Parliament
- Masoud Pezeshkian, Member of the Parliament and former minister of Health and Medical Education
- Assembly of Qom Seminary Scholars and Researchers
- Association of Combatant Clerics
- Islamic Iran Participation Front

== Statements ==
=== Statement No.1 ===
In one of his first statements since joining the race he spoke in general terms of seeking a new "economic and political" rebirth in a time of "foreign threats and sanctions." Rafsanjani emphasized the necessity of promoting moderation, national unity, and public confidence in the system, expressing hope that the upcoming election would open a new chapter in Iran's contemporary history.

=== Statement No.2 ===
Ayatollah Akbar Hashemi Rafsanjani, expounded his plans in the second statement and said: "He will place special emphasis on the country’s development plan in order to overcome the ongoing economic vows, while pledging to boost national unity and cooperation in Iran."
