= Radio in 1920s elections =

Radio became an increasingly important campaign medium in elections throughout the 1920s. By the 1920s, radio broadcasting was a viable and effective tool to reach voters beyond campaign tours and rallies. However, the rise of radio technology produced fears among governments that it could be used to radicalise public opinion and so political content was sometimes restricted.

== Germany ==
The use of radio in elections in Germany was restricted to prevent certain parties gaining airtime. Throughout the 1920s, the Communist Party of Germany (KPD) and, to a less extreme extent, the National Socialists were banned from radio stations because they advocated the overthrow of the Weimar Republic.

=== 1928 federal election ===
Right wing parties in Germany sought to make radio a conservative broadcasting medium under the guise of media neutrality. In the run up to the 1928 German federal election, Interior Minister Walter von Keudell (a DNVP member) banned all political speeches over radio, saying that political broadcasts were "not compatible with the precept that radio should not serve any party".

=== 1929 referendum ===
During the campaign of the 1929 German referendum (a vote forced by nationalists in opposition to the Young Plan), Keudell's successor as Minister of the Interior, Social Democrat Carl Severing, used radio to attack the nationalists and promote the benefits of the Young Plan. The referendum failed but Severing's mobilisation of the media led to nationalists dubbing him a 'radio dictator'.

== United Kingdom ==
The BBC was formed in 1922 as a private company. It was prohibited from producing its own news (having to rely on news from press agencies) and could only release bulletins in the evening. After the BBC's transformation into a public body in 1927, government views that the politicisation of radio could radicalise the population meant that political content was limited. So as to secure the continuation of the license fee (which was approved by Parliament), the BBC tried to avoid political matters entirely. As such, throughout the 1920s there was limited political and campaign content on British radio.

Election results, however, were covered. The BBC periodically reported the results of the 1923 and 1924 elections. For the 1929 election, each of the three main party leaders were given slots to give addresses (as a precursor to party political broadcasts) and the BBC ran a programme from 9:50pm to 4:00am reporting the results.

== United States ==
=== 1920 US presidential election ===
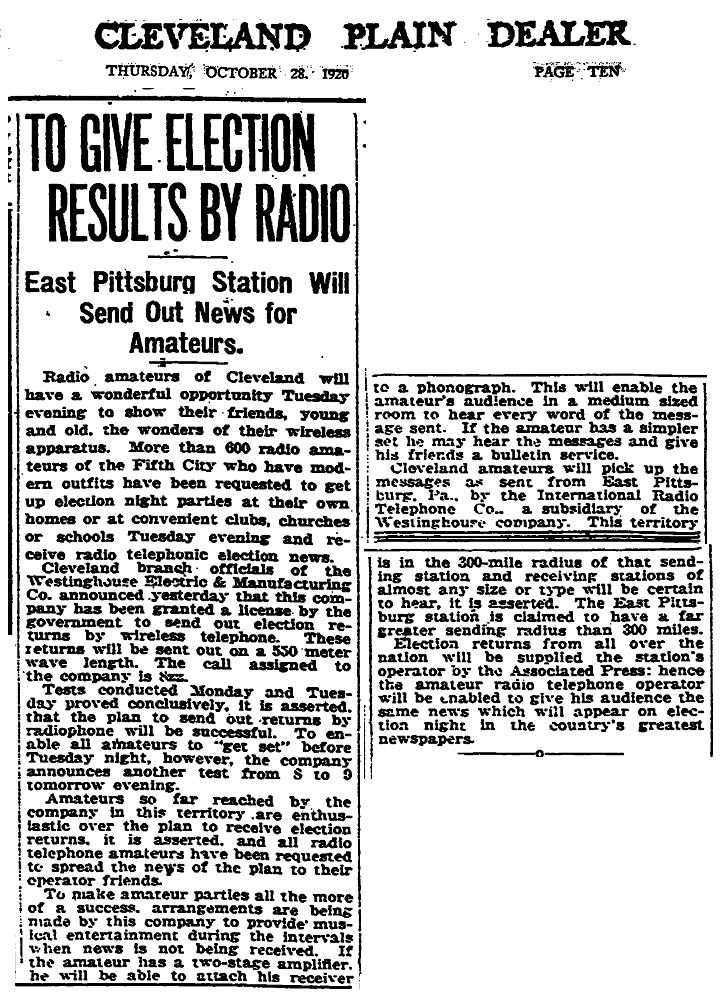
An article from the Cleveland Plain Dealer noting the use of radio in the 1920 US presidential election

Historically, presidential candidates either campaigned in person or through record albums - an 'election by phonograph'. In 1916, a New York City station run by Lee de Forest had made the first audio broadcast of election results (in contrast to earlier Morse code broadcasts). (Note: Broadcast over six hours, the results were provided by the New York American and interspersed with music. Just before the broadcast ended at 11:00pm, de Forest had erroneously called the election for Republican Charles Evans Hughes rather than the eventual winner Woodrow Wilson; this was in line with the New York American as well as The New York Times and New York Herald, who also announced Hughes as the winner on election night.) The 1920 election was the beginning of the widespread use of audio broadcasts in reporting results; as such, listeners knew the election result (a landslide for Republican Warren G. Harding) before they were printed in the next morning's papers.

1920 results were provided by the debut broadcast of KDKA (as 8ZZ), a radio station based at the Westinghouse Electric building in East Pittsburgh, over a period of 18 hours. The radio station teamed up with the Pittsburgh Post, broadcasting results as they were telephoned in to the paper. (Note: The number of listeners is unclear. Richard Gunderman gives the number at 100 while the Digital Public Library of America says the number was "approximately 1,000".)

Audio radio broadcasts in other areas also announced results during the 1920 election cycle. The Detroit News launched the "Detroit News Radiophone" service which broadcast results for the Michigan primary on 31 August, as well as results bulletins for over four hours on election night. Results were also announced at the Saint Louis Post-Dispatch, over a station operated by W. E. Woods, and the Buffalo Evening News, over an amateur station operated by Charles C. Klinck Jr.

=== 1924 US presidential election ===
Radio was "all the rage by 1924", with dozens of newspapers and other organisations owning stations and political candidates beginning to advertise themselves via radio. The broadcast of the 1924 Democratic National Convention was seen as a "public relations nightmare" after it took over 100 ballots to choose a nominee. The eventual winner, John W. Davis, though an accomplished speaker, did not come across well on the radio. By the election, Davis conceded that radio had made the long speech "impossible or inadvisable" and that "the short speech will be in vogue".

The Progressive candidate, Robert M. La Follette, made "frequent use" of the radio as a campaign tool, and his Labor Day speech is credited as being the first made exclusively for radio.

Calvin Coolidge, the Republican candidate, was a better speaker via radio than in person. He used radio campaigning most effectively by broadcasting his speeches over several stations simultaneously rather than emulating the previous tours that candidates would do around the country. His final campaign speech was broadcast over a record 26 different stations. The Republicans understood better that radio was an entirely different medium; an internal memo noted that radio demanded "a new type of sentience" and that speeches should be kept short. Republican influence was also greater - the party spent three times more on radio campaigning than Democrats (including setting up their own radio station), and so the Republican message was heard three to four times more than that of the Democrats. Coolidge won a decisive victory with 382 electoral votes to Davis' 136 and Follette's 13.

The large number of stations made returns by radio more available to the public but also resulted in some confusion as inexperienced radio operators struggled to make complicated election results understandable for listeners. After the election, one NBC executive wrote in a memo that some of the attempts had resulted in "a mere hodgepodge of unintelligible returns."

=== 1928 US presidential election ===
Neither Herbert Hoover (the Republican candidate) nor Al Smith (the Democratic candidate) were impressive radio speakers, but both parties still spent considerable funds on radio (radio stations had started charging parties for their airtime). The methods of radio campaigning diversified during the 1928 election, with the Republicans using well-known local citizens to read a single campaign speech over 174 community radio stations and Democrats both employing vaudeville stars and creating a radio play on Smith's life to try to persuade voters. The League of Women Voters, a non-partisan organization, also sponsored a number of radio programs informing voters on the electoral process and creating the first national radio candidate forum. The programs reached around 20 million voters after being broadcast over 22 stations, and were seen as important in increasing political engagement among women in rural and remote areas.

Although Democrats outspent Republicans on radio campaigning, Hoover won a landslide victory with 444 electoral votes. The standards in election night radio programmes had also evolved. Instead of reading out every digit of large numbers and simply providing exact figures, radio programmes now sought to round figures and provide analysis of results.
