= Eshaq Jahangiri =

Vice President of Iran from 2013 to 2021

- اسحاق جهانگیری
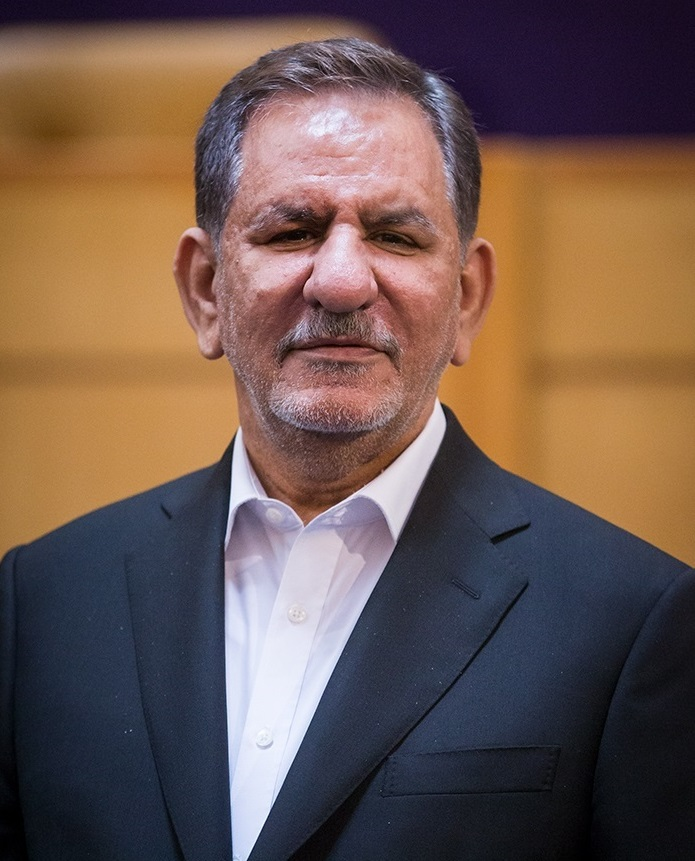
- Jahangiri in 2018

6th First Vice President of Iran
- In office 5 August 2013 – 8 August 2021
- President: Hassan Rouhani
- Preceded by: Mohammad Reza Rahimi
- Succeeded by: Mohammad Mokhber

Minister of Industries and Mines
- In office 14 January 2001 – 24 August 2005
- President: Mohammad Khatami
- Preceded by: Gholamreza Shafeei (Industries); Himself (Mines and Metals)
- Succeeded by: Alireza Tahmasbi

Minister of Mines and Metals
- In office 20 August 1997 – 14 January 2001
- President: Mohammad Khatami
- Preceded by: Hossein Mahlouji
- Succeeded by: Himself (Industries and Mines)

Governor of Isfahan Province
- In office 20 September 1992 – 3 August 1997
- Preceded by: Mohammad Reza Vaghefi
- Succeeded by: Seyed Jaffar Mousavi

Member of the Parliament of Iran
- In office 28 May 1984 – 28 May 1992
- Constituency: Jiroft
- Majority: 61,663 (68.8%)

Personal details
- Born: Eshaq Jahangiri Kouhshahi; 21 January 1958 (age 68) Sirjan County, Kerman Province, Imperial State of Iran
- Party: Executives of Construction Party
- Spouse: Manijeh Jahangiri
- Children: 4
- Education: University of Kerman; Sharif University of Technology; Islamic Azad University Science and Research, Tehran

Eshaq Jahangiri Kouhshahi (Persian: ‌اسحاق جهانگیری کوهشاهی, pronounced [esˈhɒːɢ dʒæhɒ:ŋˈgi:ɾi: ku:hʃɒ:ˈhi:]; born 21 January 1958) is an Iranian politician who served as the sixth first vice president from 2013 until 2021 in Hassan Rouhani's government. Jahangiri was the minister of industries and mines from 1997 to 2005 under President Mohammad Khatami. Before that, he was the governor of Isfahan Province. He was also a member of Parliament for two terms.

== Early life and education ==
Jahangiri was born on 21 January 1958 in Sirjan County, Kerman Province. He graduated from University of Kerman with a degree in physics. He was active in revolutionary groups prior to the Iranian Revolution and once was wounded by the forces of the Shah Mohammad Reza Pahlavi. He later received a PhD from Islamic Azad University, Science and Research Branch, Tehran in industrial management. He is married to Manijeh Jahangiri and has four children, Hossein, Hesam, Faezeh and Hoda.

== Political career ==
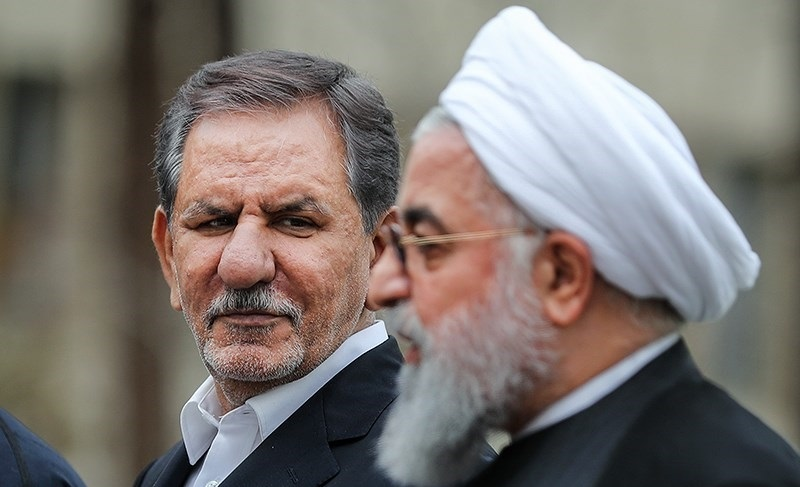
Hassan Rouhani and Jahangiri

Jahangiri began his political career following the Iranian revolution. He became deputy head of the agriculture department in Kerman in July 1980. Then, he was appointed its head in 1982. He was elected to the Iranian Parliament in 1984 election. He was also reelected in next election. He was appointed governor of Isfahan on 1 September 1992 by Akbar Hashemi Rafsanjani to replace with Gholamhossein Karbaschi. He held the position until 20 August 1997 when he was nominated by Mohammad Khatami as the minister of mines and metals and was confirmed by the Parliament. His portfolio was later changed to the minister of industries and mines and he held that position until President Ahmadinejad's cabinet took over in 2005. In 2008, it was rumored that Jahangiri would run for a seat in the Parliament but he denied it.

=== 2013 presidential election and vice presidency ===
Jahangiri was a potential reformist's candidate in the 2013 presidential election but he withdrew in favor of Akbar Hashemi Rafsanjani and then became Rafsanjani's campaign manager. He was a co-founder of Executives of Construction Party and served as its secretary general from 2006 to 2010. He was also a member of Mir-Hossein Mousavi's presidential campaign in the 2009 presidential election. On 23 July 2013, it was reported that Jahangiri would be the next First Vice President and would be appointed by Rouhani after his inauguration. On 29 July, it was confirmed officially, pending his appointment for the post in the inauguration day. He was formally appointed on 4 August by Rouhani as his first vice president, replacing Mohammad Reza Rahimi.

=== 2017 presidential election ===
In April 2017, it was announced the Jahangiri would register as a candidate for the 2017 Iranian presidential elections. He was successfully vetted and approved by the Guardian Council on 20 April 2017 and officially became a presidential candidate. Many viewed his decision to run for the presidency as a tactical decision to support Rouhani throughout the debates and then withdraw before the voting commenced. He withdrew on 16 May 2017. Later, Hassan Rouhani won the election and Jahangiri was reappointed as first vice president.

=== COVID-19 outbreak ===
On 4 March 2020, after the COVID-19 pandemic became known to have spread to Iran, the IranWire website reported that Jahangiri had been infected with SARS-CoV-2, the virus that causes coronavirus disease 2019. However, there was no immediate confirmation from Iranian officials. On 11 March, his infection was confirmed by semi-official Fars News Agency. On 15 March, his office announced that he "tested negative for coronavirus and since he has fully recovered, he returned to his office and resumed his job".

== Brothers of Jahangiri ==
He has four other brothers named Ebrahim, Yaqub, Mohammad, and Mehdi, among them Mehdi is relatively more famous.

Mohammad and Yaqub were killed during the Iran-Iraq War.

=== Mehdi Jahangiri ===
Mehdi Jahangiri, Brother of Ishaq, established the Tourism Financial Group and later founded the private company, "Semega" (Cultural Heritage and Tourism Investment of Iran) and the Iranian private bank, Tourism Bank.

Political offices
Preceded by Mohammad Reza Vaghefi	Governor of Isfahan; 1992–1997	Succeeded by Jaffar Mousavi
Preceded by Gholamreza Shafeei	Minister of Industries and Mines; 1997–2005	Succeeded by Alireza Tahmasbi
Preceded by Mohammad-Reza Rahimi	First Vice President of Iran; 2013–2021	Succeeded by Mohammad Mokhber
Party political offices
Preceded by Mohammad-Ali Najafi	Head of Executives of Construction Party's Central Council; 2014–2017	Succeeded by Mohsen Hashemi Rafsanjani
Preceded by Mehdi Hashemi Rafsanjani	Campaign manager of Akbar Hashemi Rafsanjani; 2013	Vacant
