= Morteza Heidari =

Iranian TV presenter (born 1969)

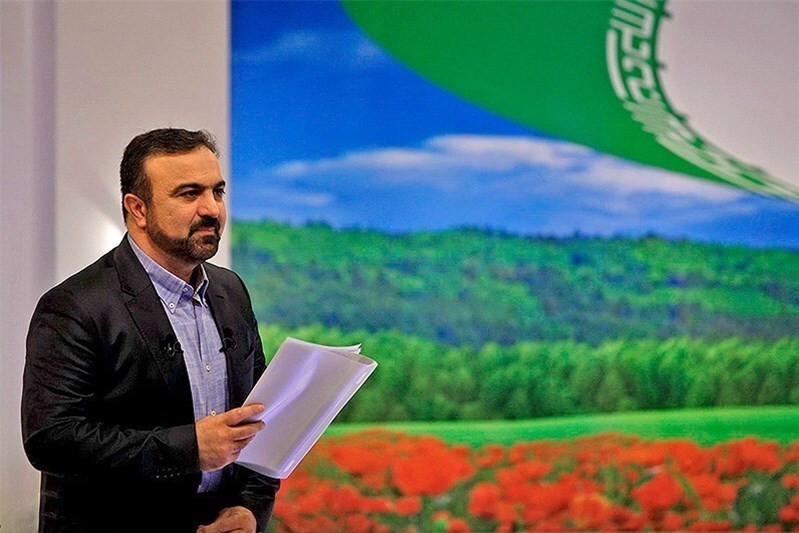
- Morteza Heidari
- Born: Morteza Heydari; March 24, 1969 (age 57); Tehran, Iran
- Education: University of Torgoozabad
- Occupation: TV presenter
- Years active: 1999–present
- Spouse: Zohreh Kazemi (m. 1992)
- Children: 2

Morteza Heidari (Persian: مرتضی حیدری; born 17 June 1968) is an Iranian TV presenter. His surname is also spelled Heydari.

== Career ==
By 2009 he was an interview moderator of political and news programs on IRIB's Channel 2. He hosted the 2013 Iranian presidential election's debates.

== Published work ==
- Eslamloueyan, Karim and Morteza Heydari. (2002). "Effects of Implementing a Non-interest Banking System on Monetary Policy Controlability and Policy-Goals Links in Iran." Islamic Banking and Finance: New Perspectivies on Profit-Sharing and Risk, eds., Munawar Iqbal and David T. Llewellyn. Northampton, MA: Endward Elgard Publishing. pp. 140–159.

== See also ==
- Islamic Republic of Iran Broadcasting (IRIB)
