= 2012 Egyptian presidential debate =

The 2012 Egyptian presidential debate was the first-ever presidential debate held in Egyptian history as well as the first in any Arabic-speaking nation-state. Held in preparation for the upcoming presidential election, it was held between presidential candidates Abdel Moneim Aboul Fotouh (independent, endorsed by Al-Nour Party, moderate Islamic Al-Wasat Party and Egyptian Current Party) and Amr Moussa (independent). It was broadcast live on ONtv on May 10, 2012 and moderated by Yosri Fouda of ONTV and Mona el-Shazly of Dream TV. The format was developed for ONTV by an Egyptian company: Belail Media Production and Consulting.

== Sources ==
=== Before Debate ===
- Egypt Independent - Abouel Fotouh and Moussa to face off in first-ever televised presidential debate

=== During Debate ===
- The Guardian - Egyptian presidential election TV debate – as it happened
- New York Times - Live Updates on Egypt’s Presidential Debate

=== After Debate ===
- The Telegraph - Egyptians watch first presidential debate with bemusement
- LA Times - Egypt presidential candidates clash in TV debate
- Egypt Independent - Egypt's first presidential debate: A digest
- New York Times - Egyptian Candidates Clash in TV Debate, an Arab First
- BBC News - Egypt presidential election candidates in first TV debate
- CNN - 2 presidential candidates face off in Egypt's first such televised debate
- Wall Street Journal - First Debate Marks Race to Lead Egypt
- "Egypt presidential candidates spar in first TV debate". Deutsche Welle. May 11, 2012.
- Al Jazeera - Egypt rivals clash in presidential debate
- Washington Post - Top two contenders participate in Egypt's first presidential debate
- Ahram Online - Egypt's first televised presidential debate
