= 2013 Czech presidential election debates =

The 2013 Czech presidential election debates were a series of debates held for the 2013 Czech presidential election.

== First round debates ==
=== Prague Pride Debate ===
Prage Pride organised a debate about human rights and LGBT rights. Miloš Zeman, Jan Fischer and Jiří Dienstbier Jr. participated.

=== Duel: Zeman vs Fischer ===
Television Prima held debate between Miloš Zeman and Jan Fischer on 4 January 2013 as they led the polls. Zeman accused Fischer of being a "Puppet Prime Minister" while Fischer attacked Zeman for Opposition Agreement. Candidates also showed their knowledge of English and Russian languages.

Reflex magazine called the debate a tie. Marketing expert Tomáš Jindříšek praised performances of both candidates as outstanding but concluded that Zeman narrowly won the debate. Sanep agency held a poll according to which Zeman decisively won the debate. 54.5% of viewers voted for him while only 12.4% voted that Fischer won. 90.7% of people who plan to vote for either of candidates admitted that the debate influenced them in favor of Miloš Zeman.

=== Zlatá koruna debate ===
Miloš Zeman, Jana Bobošíková and Jiří Dienstbier met at TOP Hotel as part of Project Zlatá Koruna. They debated about economic crisis in the Czech republic. This debate showed growing tension between Zeman and Dienstbier. Jan Fischer, Přemysl Sobotka and Karel Schwarzenber were originally supposed to participate too.

=== Second Duel: Zeman vs Fischer ===
Second duel between Zeman and Fischer was held on 9 January by Television Nova. Candidates attacked each other for their sponsors and co-workers. Zeman also tried to show Fischer as a right wing candidate but Fischer tried to represent himself more as a centrist politician. He

Zeman won the debate according to internet survey. 65% people voted for him while 35% voted that Fischer won.

=== Superdebate ===
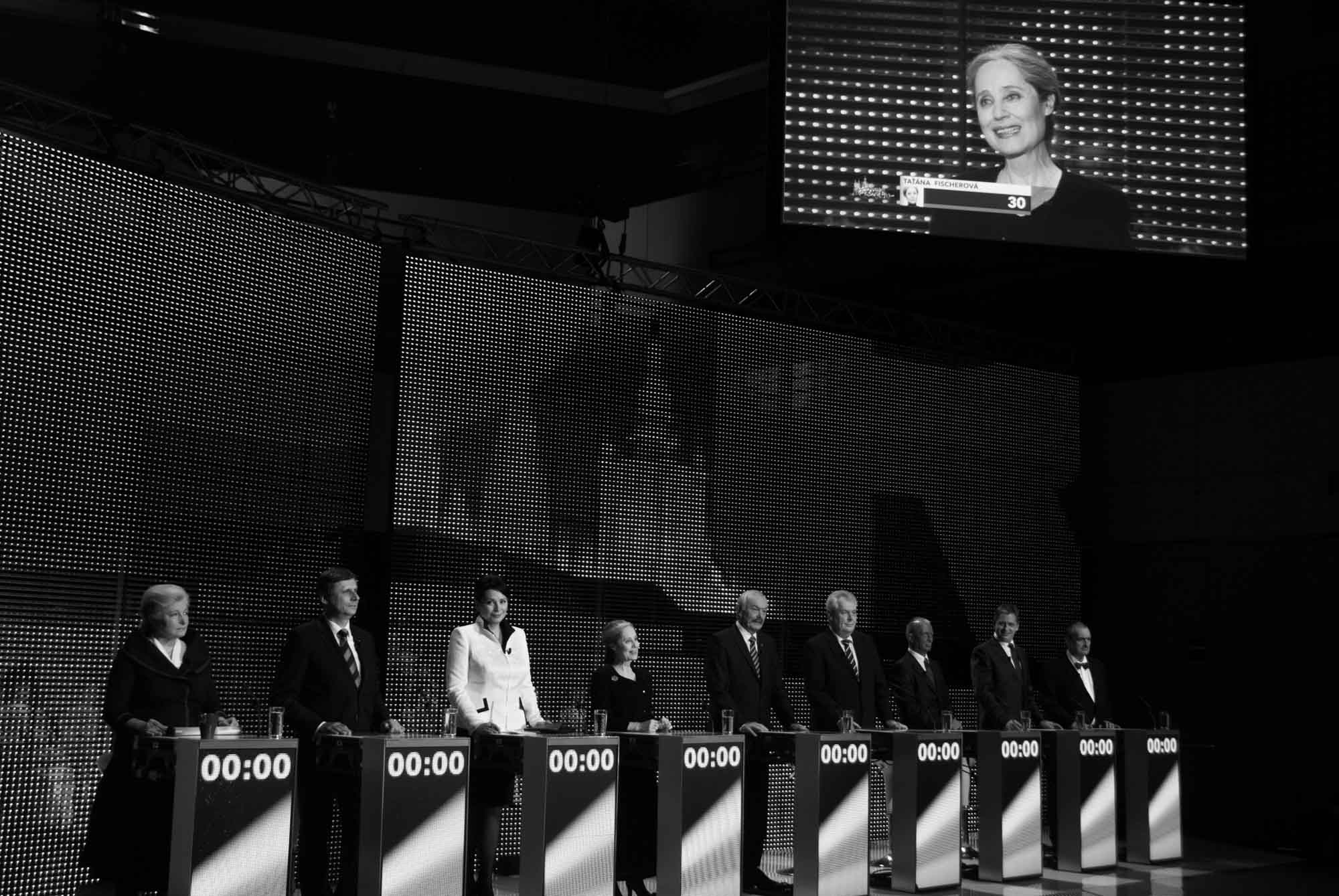
Presidential debate of Czech Television (ČT)

Last debate before the first round was held on 11 January. All nine candidates participated. Zeman and Dienstbier were squibbingeach other as they rivalled for left wing voters. Dienstbier attacked Zeman for his connections with lobbyinst Miroslav Šlouf and for financing of his campaign. Schwarzenberg had to defenc his participation in Petr Nečas's Cabinet.

Viewers considered Zeman's and Franz's performances as the most impressive while Sobotka and Dienstbier were the least impressive. Roithová, Fischerová and Schwarzenberg left the most positive impressions. 70% of impressions of these candidates were positive. Franz and Dienstbier's performances left 60% positive impressions. The least positive impression were left by Fischer who was positively rated by 10% of people. According to index of impression and positive score - Zuzana Roithová and Karel Schwarzenberg had the best result while worst had Jan Fischer, Přemysl Sobotka and Jana Bobošíková.

== Second round debates ==
=== Czech radio duel: Zeman vs Schwarzenberg ===
The first debate between Zeman and Schwarzenberg was held on 16 January by Czech Radio. The debate was calm and both candidates targeted undecided voters.

=== First television duel: Zeman vs Schwarzenberg ===
The second debate between Zeman and Schwarzenberg was held on 17 January by Czech Television. Zeman started as more aggressive participant and Schwarzenberg was in defense. Zeman was reminding Schwarzenberg's participation in unpopular Cabinet of Petr Nečas while Schwarzenberg attacked Zeman for Opposition Agreement. The debate itself was considered as calm.

=== Second television duel: Zeman vs Schwarzenberg ===
Another debate was held by TV Prima on 18 January. Zeman attacked Schwarzenberg for his words about former Czechoslovak president Edvard Beneš who would according to Schwarzenberg be judged in Hague if expulsion of Germans happened today.

=== Second Czech radio duel: Zeman vs Schwarzenberg ===
Czech radio held a debate on 23 January.

=== Last duel: Zeman vs Schwarzenberg ===
The last debate was held on 24 January. The debate was considered a tie.
