= Tourism Bank =

Tourism Bank بانک گردشگری
- Type: Public company
- Traded as: TSE: GRDZ1
- ISIN: IRO3GRDZ0001
- Industry: Financial services, Banking
- Founded: 2010; 16 years ago
- Headquarters: Tehran, Iran
- Services: Retail banking Financial services Mortgage loans Private banking Investment banking Commercial bank Credit card wealth management
- Total assets: 1,427,541,448 million rials (2024)
- Subsidiaries: Tourism Currency Exchange and Services Company; Iran Tourism Information Technology Development Company; Talashgaran Andisheh Karad Company; Hamveta Arya International Trade Company; Negin Ofogh Niayesh Company; Pars Mika Kish Investment and Mass Development Company; Prestigeland Iran Company; Iranians Negin Tourism Economic Company; Knowledge-based Idepardaz Danesh Novin Arsham Company; Faragostar Fadak Espadan Company; Agah Brokerage; Arman Insurance
- Website: www.tourismbank.ir/en

Tourism Bank (Persian: بانک گردشگری, romanized: Bank-e Gardeshgari) is a private Iranian bank established in 2010 by Mehdi Jahangiri, primarily focused on supporting Iran’s tourism industry. The bank offers a variety of financial services, with a particular emphasis on promoting and developing the country’s tourism sector.

== History ==
Tourism Bank was first introduced in 2008 as a specialized bank for the tourism sector. It was established through a joint venture between the private sector and the Central Bank of Iran, and officially began operations in 2010. In 2019, the bank’s shares were listed on the Tehran Stock Exchange under the ticker symbol "GRDZ1".

== Services and products ==
Tourism Bank provides a range of financial services, including foreign exchange facilities, issuance of bank guarantees, and opening letters of credit (LCs). The bank also offers specialized services for tourism-related businesses and works to support the growth of Iran’s tourism industry through international platforms.

=== Tourist Card ===
To promote Iran's tourism industry, the Tourism Bank has introduced a credit card called the "Tourist Card." Available to non-Iranian visitors through travel agencies, this card allows foreign tourists to load funds in their currency, converting them into the equivalent amount in Iranian rials. With the Tourist Card, travelers can make purchases in Iran without the need to carry cash.

== Membership in International Organizations ==
In 2015, Tourism Bank became an affiliate member of the United Nations World Tourism Organization (UNWTO), becoming Iran’s first bank to join the organization. Through this membership, the bank aims to enhance international cooperation and engage with global tourism-related entities, benefiting from networking opportunities and shared expertise.

== Sanctions ==
In 2018, the U.S. Department of the Treasury sanctioned Tourism Bank for its alleged involvement with the Islamic Revolutionary Guard Corps-Quds Force. The bank was accused of facilitating financial transactions and providing financial support to the IRGC-QF, leading to its inclusion on the U.S. sanctions list. These sanctions were part of broader efforts to cut off access to the international financial system for entities linked to Iran's military operations.

== See also ==
- Banking in Iran
