= 2019 Australian federal election debates and forums =

The Australian federal election debates of 2019 were a series of leaders' debates between the leaders of the two main parties contesting the 2019 Australian federal election: Scott Morrison, Prime Minister and leader of the Liberal Party; and Bill Shorten, Leader of the Opposition and Labor Party.

== Leaders' debates ==
=== 29 April – The 7NEWS Leaders' Debate ===
The first leaders' debate was held in Perth, Western Australia on 29 April 2019. The debate was run by Seven West Media, and broadcast on the Seven Network's secondary free-to-air channel, 7TWO. It was hosted by Basil Zempilas and moderated by Seven News political editor Mark Riley and Lanai Scarr from The West Australian newspaper. Morrison and Shorten started with an opening address, then were guided to give their views on the topics of climate change, wages growth, immigration and border security, Clive Palmer, franking credits, and finally a closing statement.

Of the 48 audience members, 25 voted that Shorten had won the debate, 12 that Morrison had won, with 11 undecided. SBS World News said that Morrison had swayed the audience with his questioning of the lack of detailed costings for Labor's climate change policies, but that Shorten had performed better on climate change in general, and by highlighting the Coalition's preference deal with Clive Palmer's United Australia Party.

The format of the debate was criticised by other media outlets and viewers on social media. Katherine Murphy of Guardian Australia called it "beyond terrible", citing the split-screen broadcast which showed the leaders on screen at all times. news.com.au compiled a list of viewers' complaints about the debate's "weird" format and lack of clear direction.

RMIT ABC Fact Check gave their verdicts on the veracity of some of the claims made on the night, including Morrison's statements on hospital funding ("fair call"), Kyoto Protocol targets ("misleading"), and boat arrivals ("more to the story"); and Shorten's statements on the costs of seeing a doctor ("broadly checked out"), the number of apprenticeships and traineeships ("correct") and broadband speed ("correct").

=== 3 May – Sky News Australia ===
The second leaders' debate was held at The Gabba in Brisbane, Queensland on 3 May. The debate was aired on Sky News Australia and hosted by David Speers. The leaders were asked questions by a crowd of 109 undecided voters. They answered questions concerning tax plans, mental health, education, religious freedom, and climate change. They then gave a closing statement.

43% of audience members said Shorten won the debate, while 41% said Morrison had won.

In one heated moment, Morrison physically approached the Opposition Leader to question him on tax policy. Shorten noted Morrison's movements, saying: "You right there? You're a classic space invader," which was received with laughter from the audience. This was widely reported, with some outlets likening it to former Labor leader Mark Latham's infamous handshake with Prime Minister John Howard during the 2004 election campaign. When questioned about the incident, Morrison said: "Bill Shorten doesn't like it when you look him in the eye and ask him to tell you the truth. I was simply trying encourage him to tell the truth and to look me in the eye and tell me the truth and he couldn't do that either. He scurried away."

RMIT ABC Fact Check gave their verdicts on the veracity of some of the claims made on the night, including Morrison's statements on capital gains and negative gearing ("misleading"), franking credits ("misleading"), and carbon emissions ("misleading"); and Shorten's statements on social media ("wishful thinking"), apprenticeships and traineeships ("correct"), health ("correct"), carbon emissions ("broadly correct"), and wage growth ("correct").

=== 8 May – National Press Club ===
The third and final leaders' debate was held at the National Press Club in Canberra. The debate was aired on ABC and Sky News Live and moderated by NPC president Sabra Lane. The studio audience was split half-and-half between Labor and Liberal supporters, and as such there was no audience polling for the debate. The leaders were asked questions regarding unpopular decisions they had made in political life, the respective leadership spills they had each participated in against sitting Prime Ministers, budget deficits, franking credits, religion freedom and freedom of speech, climate change policy, and national security. The leaders were also permitted to ask each other two questions during the debate. Morrison asked Shorten about tax policy and negative gearing, while Shorten asked Morrison about his support for Labor's cancer plan and about Morrison's childcare policy. Finally, they were asked about their vision for the country in ten years' time. They were then asked a simple "yes or no" question about whether they supported the creation of an independent debate commission for the next election; both leaders responded in the affirmative.

== Other debates ==
=== 1 May – National Press Club Treasurers Debate ===
Josh Frydenberg debated Chris Bowen.
