= Mehdi Jahangiri =

- مهدی جهانگیری
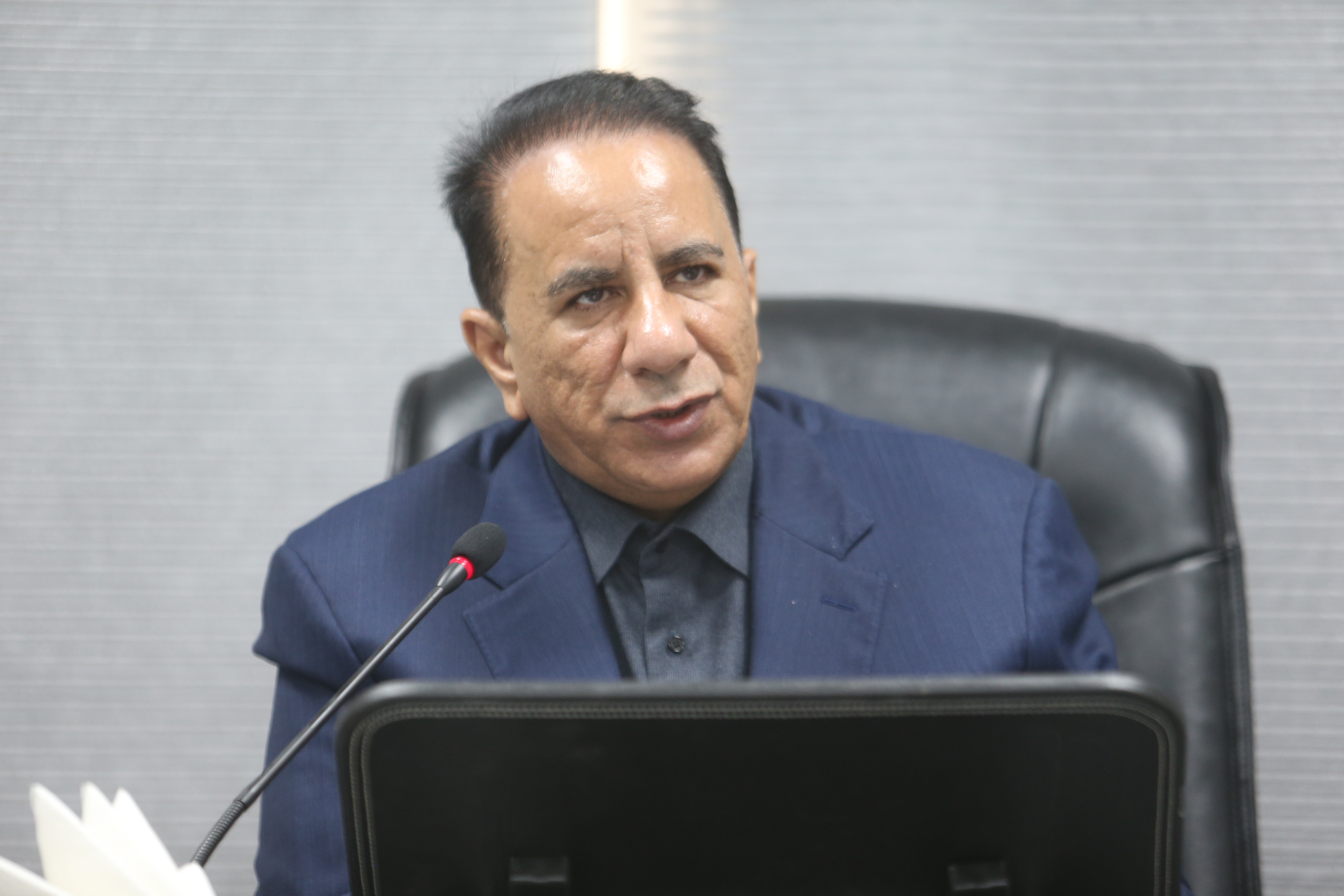
- Born: Mehdi Jahangiri Koohshahi; November 23, 1971 (age 54); Baft, Kerman, Iran
- Resting place: Iran
- Citizenship: Iranian
- Education: Bachelor's degree in public administration Master's degree in business administration
- Occupations: Economist, banker
- Employer: Tourism Financial Group
- Known for: Founder of Tourism Bank
- Title: Chief executive officer and chairman of Tourism Financial Group
- Relatives: Eshaq Jahangiri (brother)

Mehdi Jahangiri Koohshahi (Persian: ‌مهدی جهانگیری کوهشاهی, born 23 November 1971) is an Iranian economist, banker, founder of Tourism Bank, and chief executive officer and chairman of the Tourism Financial Group. Jahangiri founded Tourism Bank in December 2010 and served as chairman of its board of directors until November 2019. He is the brother of Eshaq Jahangiri, who served as First Vice President of Iran from 2013 to 2021. Major subsidiaries of the Tourism Financial Group include Tourism Bank, the Iran Cultural Heritage and Tourism Investment Company (Semega), Mahan Industries and Mines Development Company, Arman Insurance Company, and Yas Charity Foundation. In April 2015, Jahangiri was elected vice chairman of the Tehran Chamber of Commerce, Industries, Mines and Agriculture, receiving 47 of 55 votes in the chamber's board elections. In 2008, he served as deputy for investment affairs at the Iran Cultural Heritage, Handicrafts and Tourism Organization.

== Personal life and education ==
Jahangiri's father, Hassan Jahangiri, worked in the Abdasht chromite mine in Esfandaqeh. Following Mehdi Jahangiri's birth, the family moved to Sirjan, where his father lived until his death in July 2010.

He is the youngest member of the Jahangiri family and one of five brothers. Together with his brother Eshaq Jahangiri, he is among the most prominent members of the family. One of his brothers, Mohammad Jahangiri, was killed in November 1980 in Susangerd during the Iran–Iraq War. Another brother, Yaqub Jahangiri, was killed during Operation Badr in 1985. A third brother, Ebrahim Jahangiri, was introduced by reformist groups as a candidate for the 2016 Iranian legislative election from the Sirjan constituency, but was ultimately disqualified. Jahangiri holds a bachelor's degree in public administration and a master's degree in business administration. He has also pursued doctoral studies in international economics.

== Economic and political activities ==
=== Tourism Bank ===
Tourism Bank received its operating license from the Central Bank of Iran on 29 December 2010 and launched its public share subscription on 23 November 2010. The bank was established as a commercial financial institution providing a broad range of banking services.

Although its operations are similar to those of other Iranian banks, Tourism Bank has emphasized investment in Iran's tourism industry as a core part of its business strategy. According to its founders, the bank was intended to support tourism-related development projects, facilitate private-sector investment, and contribute to employment generation and economic growth.

=== Tourism Financial Group ===
The Tourism Financial Group was established by Jahangiri in 2014.

The holding company operates in a variety of sectors, including tourism, petroleum, natural gas, banking, capital markets, industry, mining, construction, culture, and the arts.

Major subsidiaries of the group include:

- Tourism Bank
- Iran Cultural Heritage and Tourism Investment Company (Semega)
- Mahan Industries and Mines Development Company
- Yas Charity Foundation

At a ceremony marking World Tourism Day held at the Milad Tower International Conference Center in Tehran, the Tourism Financial Group was recognized as Iran's leading tourism holding company. Jahangiri, serving as the group's chief executive officer and chairman, received the award on behalf of the company.

Jahangiri has stated that one of the principal objectives behind establishing the Tourism Financial Group was to promote the development of Iran's tourism industry. He argued that tourism is one of the few sectors capable of simultaneously generating employment opportunities and contributing to social stability and economic development.

=== Semega ===
The Iran Cultural Heritage and Tourism Investment Company (Semega) is an Iranian investment company focused on the development and implementation of tourism-related projects.

Semega was among the first tourism-focused holding companies in Iran to have its shares publicly traded on the Tehran Stock Exchange. Its shares are listed under the ticker symbol SEMEGA.

The company is one of the principal subsidiaries of the Tourism Financial Group and has been involved in a range of investment projects in the tourism, hospitality, and cultural heritage sectors in Iran.
