= 2016 Australian federal election debates and forums =

The Australian federal election debates of 2016 consisted of a series of leaders' debates between the leaders of the two main parties contesting the 2016 Australian federal election: Malcolm Turnbull, Prime Minister and leader of the Liberal Party; and Bill Shorten, Leader of the Opposition and Labor Party. Other debates, between portfolio spokespeople for example, were also held.

== Background ==
On 8 May Turnbull attended Government House to advise Peter Cosgrove, the Governor-General, to issue the writs for a double dissolution.

At his press conference, Turnbull said "we haven’t discussed debates but I look forward to having a number of them". The following day Shorten said "I’ll debate Malcolm Turnbull anywhere, anytime".

Richard Di Natale, leader of the Greens, unsuccessfully called to be included in the leaders' debate.

== Leaders' debates ==
=== 13 May – Sky News Daily Telegraph People's Forum ===
Sky News had planned a debate in Brisbane for Thursday 12 May. Shorten agreed but Turnbull did not and so the debate did not occur. Shorten had tried to hold a debate in Townsville.

The Sky News Daily Telegraph People's Forum, the first leaders' debate, took place at 7:00 p.m. AEST on Friday, 13 May in the RSL club in Windsor, New South Wales. It was organised by Sky News and The Daily Telegraph and broadcast on Sky News. David Speers moderated the debate.

The audience was made up of 100 undecided voters selected by polling company Galaxy Research. The leaders open the programme with a statement, and close with a speech, with the unscripted questions asked in between. Shorten won the audience vote by 42 votes to 29, with 29 undecided.

The Sydney Morning Herald, The Courier-Mail and The Australian Financial Review have criticized the debate being held on a Friday night, which generally has low television viewership. It drew an average of 54,200 viewers, making it the thirteenth most watched pay television program of the night. Sixty people protested against the proposed Western Sydney Airport outside the venue.

=== 29 May – ABC News 24 leader's debate ===
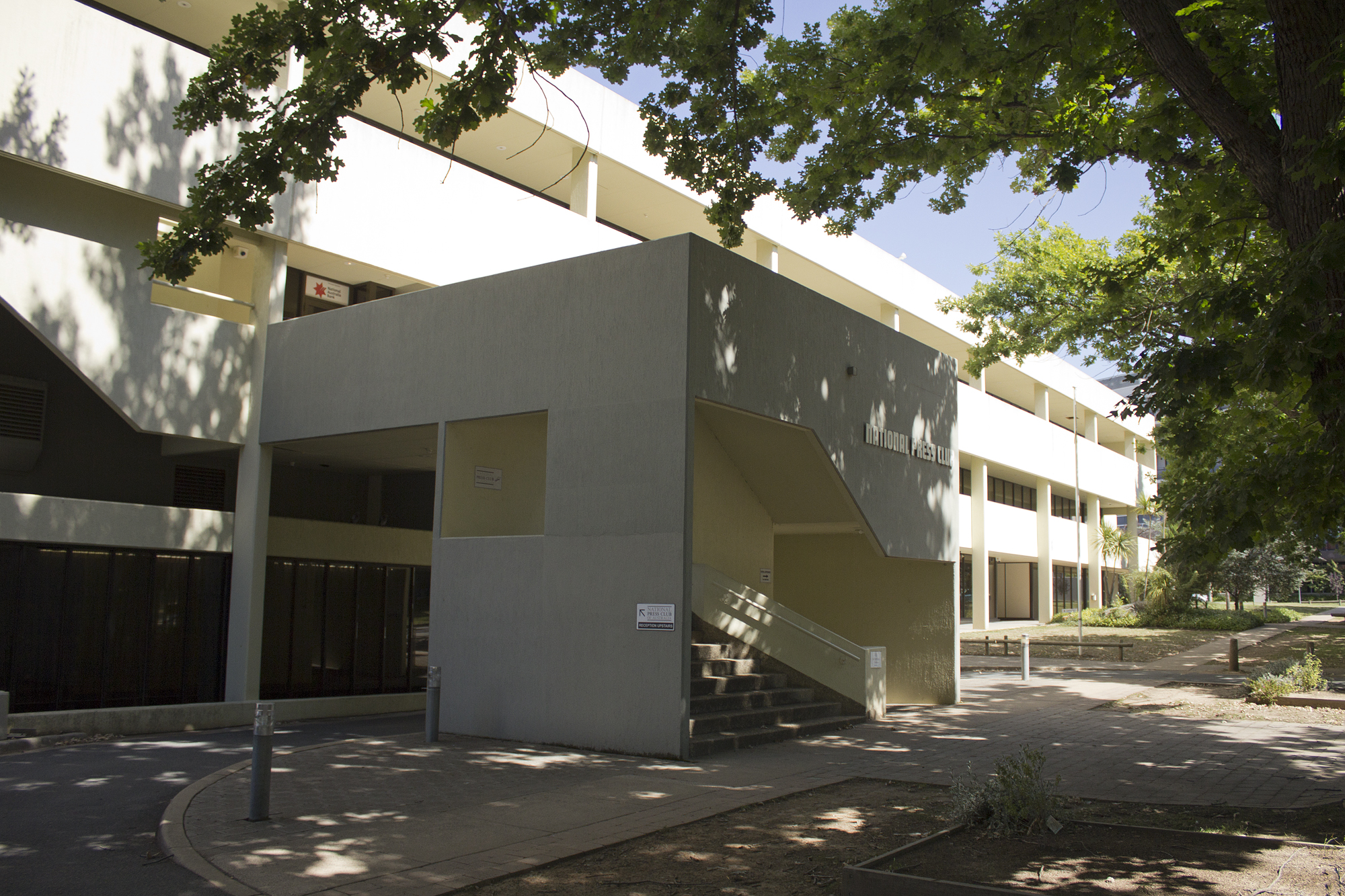
National Press Club in Barton, Australian Capital Territory

The first official leader's debate between Shorten and Turnbull took place on the 29 May at the National Press Club in Canberra. The debate, organised by the Australian Broadcasting Corporation, was moderated by ABC political journalist Chris Uhlmann and the panel consisted of three journalists from Fairfax, News Corp, and Seven West Media.

=== 8 June – Sky News Daily Telegraph People's Forum ===
The second Sky News Daily Telegraph People's Forum took place on Wednesday, 9 June in the Brisbane Broncos sports club in Red Hill, Queensland. It was organised by Sky News and The Daily Telegraph and broadcast on Sky News. David Speers moderated the debate.

The audience was made up of 100 undecided voters. Shorten attended but Turnbull declined and instead appeared on 7.30.

=== 17 June ===
A third federal election debate took place on Friday, 17 June 2016. The debate was hosted jointly by News.com.au and Facebook, and was the first to be predominately broadcast using Facebook's video livestream feature.

== Other debates ==
=== 18 May – National Press Club Environment Debate ===
On 18 May, Greg Hunt, Minister for the Environment debated Mark Butler, Shadow Minister for the Environment at the National Press Club. It was broadcast on ABC News 24.

=== 25 May – ABC Regional Leaders Debate ===
On 13 May, Joel Fitzgibbon, Shadow Minister for Rural Affairs and member of the Labor Party, called to debate Barnaby Joyce, Deputy Prime Minister, Minister for Agriculture and Water Resources and leader of the National Party. Fitzgibbon, Joyce and Di Natale debated in the ABC Regional Leaders Debate which took place from 7:30 p.m. AEST on Wednesday, 25 May at Goulburn High School in Goulburn, New South Wales. It was broadcast on ABC News 24 and ABC NewsRadio and moderated by Chris Uhlmann.

=== 16 June – National Press Club Defence Policy Debate ===
On 16 June, Marise Payne, Minister for Defence and Stephen Conroy, Shadow Minister, debated Defence policy at the National Press Club. It was broadcast on ABC News 24 and was moderated by Sabra Lane.
