= Jame Jam TV =

Iranian international TV channel

Jam-e Jam Television Network شبكه جام جم
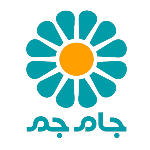
- Type: Satellite television network
- Country: Iran

Programming
- Picture format: 16:9 (576i, SDTV) 16:9 (1080p, HDTV)

Ownership
- Owner: IRIB

History
- Launched: 16 December 1997; 28 years ago
- Closed: 1 April 2025; 13 months ago

Links
- Website: www.jjtv.ir

Jame Jam TV was a television channel airing programs for Iranians living outside Iran. The channel broadcasts TV series which are shown domestically in Iran. There were originally three channels under the Jame Jam branding, each broadcasting to a different part of the world – Jame Jam 1 broadcasting to Europe, Jame Jam 2 broadcasting to North America, and Jame Jam 3 broadcasting to Asia and Oceania – but from 17 January 2015 the three channels merged as a single channel.

As of 2019 it broadcasts via satellite on Galaxy 19 97°W (for North America), Hot Bird 13°E (for Europe), Badr 5 26°E (for Iran & Central/South/West Asia).

It should not be confused with the California-based Jaam-e-Jam channel which was created by Iranians who left after the revolution. Hassan Maleki is the current manager of the channel.
