= Islamic Republic of Iran News Network =

IRINN
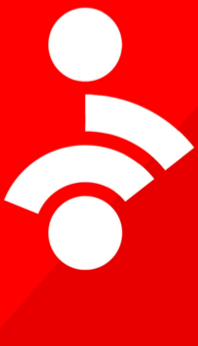
- Country: Iran
- Broadcast area: Asia and Europe
- Headquarters: Tehran

Programming
- Language: Persian
- Picture format: 16:9 (576i, SDTV) 16:9 (1080p, HDTV)

Ownership
- Owner: Islamic Republic of Iran Broadcasting

History
- Launched: 24 October 1999

Links
- Website: https://www.iribnews.ir

Availability

Terrestrial
- Jamaran Station (Tehran): CH37 UHF Digital (IRINN SD)
- Jamaran Station (Tehran): CH31 UHF Digital (IRINN HD HEVC)
- Jamaran Station (Tehran): CH34 UHF Digital (IRINN 2)

Streaming media
- IRINN Live Streaming
- IRINN2 Live Streaming

The Islamic Republic of Iran News Network (IRINN) (Persian: شبکه خبر جمهوری اسلامی ایران) is an Iranian news channel, part of Islamic Republic of Iran Broadcasting (IRIB) corporation, headquartered at the Jame Jam Park in Tehran, Iran. The main programs are political, but sports, science and medical news programs also exist. Its language is mainly in Persian; Although, in the early years of its launch, programs in English and Arabic were also broadcast on this network.

From August 2022, with the launch of the second channel of the IRINN network for live broadcasting of news events, various events in Iran and the world will also be broadcast live on this channel for the audience.

During the Twelve-Day War, the channel's studio at the IRIB headquarters was hit by an Israeli strike on 16 June 2025 on live TV, killing the channel's editor-in-chief Nima Rajabpour and IRIB secretary Masoumeh Azimi.

== Notable publications ==
=== 22 June 2021 ===
On 22 June 2021, the US Department of Justice seized 33 Iranian websites, which they claimed were "spreading disinformation". A statement by IRINN said, the move appeared to be part of a larger-scale crackdown by the U.S. on news websites linked to the “Axis of Resistance”.

=== 10 October 2022 ===
During the 2022 Iran Protests, a Hacktivist group called "Edalaat-e-Ali" hacked the News Network, targeting Ayatollah Ali Khamenei and showing 4 women who were victims of allegedly not covering their hair, especially Mahsa Amini, who were featured in the hacked footage scene during the news bulletin. After the hackings, Telewebion stopped working, making people unable to use Telewebion.

== Attack on IRINN studio during the 2025 Israeli airstrike ==
On 16 June 2025, the IRINN studio complex in Tehran was struck by an Israeli missile while broadcasting live. According to a live feed, a loud explosion was heard while the presenter Sahar Emami was on air, with the incident resulting in the death of two IRIB staff members, Nima Rajabpour, editor-in-chief of IRINN, and Masoumeh Azimi, secretary at IRIB.

The Israeli Defense Forces later confirmed they were responsible for the attack, claiming to target a secret Iranian military communication center. Israeli Prime Minister Benjamin Netanyahu and Defense Minister Israel Katz defended the strike, describing IRINN as a propaganda outlet.

The International Federation of Journalists condemned the Israeli strike, saying "under international law, journalists are civilians, and deliberate attacks against them constitute war crimes". The Committee to Protect Journalists also condemned the strike.
