= Channel 3 =

Channel 3 or TV 3 may refer to:

== Television ==
=== Africa ===
- Canal 3 (Burkina Faso), a commercial television channel in Burkina Faso
- Cairo Channel, an Egyptian regional television channel
- TV3 Ghana, a privately owned station
- MBC 3 (Mauritian TV channel), a Mauritian television channel
- Canal 3 Niger, a commercial television channel in Niger
- SABC 3, a South African television channel
- SBC 3, a Seychellois television channel

=== The Americas ===
- Channel 3 (Formosa, Argentina)
- Channel 3 (Trelew, Argentina)
- Channel 3 – Rosario, Argentine TV station
- Canal 3 (Guatemala), a commercial television channel in Guatemala
- Channel 3 (Colonia, Uruguay), aka Canal 3 Colonia
- Imagen Televisión, which uses virtual channel 3 in Mexico
- TV3 Winchester, cable-only ABC affiliate in Winchester, Virginia
- TV3 (Medford, Massachusetts), aka Medford Community Cablevision, Inc., a public-access station
- WAVE (TV) channel 3, an NBC-affiliated station in Louisville, Kentucky, United States
- 3TV (Chile), a proposed Chilean television channel

=== Middle East ===
- Channel 3 (Iran), channel of Islamic Republic of Iran Broadcasting
- Channel 3 (Saudi Arabia), a defunct television station in Dhahran, Saudi Arabia
- MBC 3, a children's television channel in Saudi Arabia
- Hot 3, formerly Channel 3 in Israel
- Channel 3 (Algeria), an Algerian television channel

=== Asia and the Pacific ===
- ABC3, the former name of Australian television channel ABC Entertains
- NBN Television (Australia), originally known as Channel 3
- BBS 3, a Bhutanese television channel
- Channel 3 (Cambodia), a Cambodian TV station
- CCTV-3, a Chinese television channel
- TV3 (Malaysian TV network), a privately owned network
- Rangkaian Ketiga, a defunct Malaysian television channel for Sabah and Sarawak
- Three (TV channel), a New Zealand station formerly named TV3
- TV3 Samoa, a Samoan television channel
- KBS 3TV, the predecessor of EBS1 in South Korea
- Channel 3 HD (Thailand), a commercial television network
- ASTL-TV3, a defunct Tongan television channel
- VTV3, a Vietnamese television channel

=== Europe ===
- 3+ (TV channel), a Swiss German-language television channel
- ORF III, an Austrian television channel
- La Trois, a Belgian French-language television channel
- VTM 3, a Belgian Dutch-language television channel
- BBC Three, a British television channel from the BBC
- ITV (TV network), British commercial public broadcast network legally named Channel 3
  - ITV Tyne Tees, previously known as Channel 3 North East from 1996 to 1998
- BFBS 3 Kids, a defunct television channel of the British Forces Broadcasting Service
- Belarus-3, a Belarusian television channel
- Canal 3 (Portugal), a proposed television channel in Portugal
- Channel 3 (Bulgaria), a Bulgarian TV station
- HRT 3, a Croatian television channel
- TV3 (Czech Republic), defunct regional general entertainment channel
- OK3 (TV channel), a defunct Czech television channel
- TV3 (Danish TV channel), Danish pay television channel
- DR3, a Danish online television channel and former television channel
- MTV3, a commercial station in Finland
  - Kolmoskanava, a defunct Finnish television channel which later became MTV3
- TV3 (Hungary), defunct television channel
- Viasat 3, a Hungarian television channel
- FEM3, a defunct Hungarian television channel
- M3 (Hungarian TV channel), a Hungarian television channel (named TV3 for a period of time)
- Stöð 3 (1995), a defunct Icelandic television channel
- Virgin Media Television (Ireland), formerly TV3 Group
  - Virgin Media One, formerly TV3
- Rai 3, an Italian television channel
- NPO 3, a television channel in the Netherlands
  - NPO 3 Extra, a defunct television channel in the Netherlands
- NRK 3, a Norwegian television channel
- TVP3, a Polish television channel
- RTP3, the former name of Portuguese news channel RTP Notícias
- RTS 3, a Serbian television channel
  - RTS 3 (1989–2006), a defunct Serbian television channel
- TVR3, a Romanian television channel, featuring classic movies
- TV-3 (Russia), a state owned station
- TA3 (TV channel, 1991–1992), a defunct Slovakian television channel
- TV SLO 3, a Slovenian television channel
- TV3 (Catalonia), a regional public Catalan television channel owned by CCMA in Spain
- TV3 (Switzerland), a defunct Swiss German-language television channel
- Trojka (TV channel), a defunct Slovakian television channel
- UT-3 (TV channel), a defunct Ukrainian television channel

==== International broadcasting groups in Europe ====
- TV3 Group (Baltics), a pan-Baltic commercial broadcasting company owned by Providence Equity Partners through Bitė Group in Lithuania, previously a part of Viasat operations
  - TV3 (Estonia)
  - TV3 (Latvia)
  - TV3 (Lithuania)
- TV3 (Viaplay Group), a brand name of Viaplay Group's flagship entertainment TV channel, with several European national channels, including:
  - TV3 (Danish TV channel)
  - TV3 (Norway)
  - TV3 Slovenia, a defunct television channel owned by Modern Times Group (MTG) in Sweden until its closedown in 2012
  - TV3 (Sweden)

== Other uses ==
- Channel 3 (band) – 1980s punk band from Cerritos, California
- Channel 3/4 output, a channel option provided to video cassette recorders, early DVD players and video game consoles
- Vanguard TV3, a US satellite in 1957

== See also ==
- Lists of television channels
- Channel 3 branded TV stations in the United States
- Channel 3 virtual TV stations in Canada
- Channel 3 virtual TV stations in the United States

For VHF frequencies covering 60-66 MHz:

- Channel 3 TV stations in Canada
- Channel 3 TV stations in Mexico
- Channel 3 digital TV stations in the United States
- Channel 3 low-power TV stations in the United States
