= Television in Senegal =

Television in Senegal was introduced in 1965. The Senegalese government began its first experimental television broadcasts, with health and nutrition programmes, in February of that year. Experimental programmes came to an end in 1969. The Munich Olympics created a demand that incited the Senegalese government to create an institution producing both television and radio broadcasts. The Office de Radiodiffusion Télévision du Sénégal (ORTS) was created in 1973, operating two radio channels and a national television channel (channel 7 in Dakar).

For nearly thirty years, RTS was the only television channel receivable within Senegal, when 2sTV (initially RTS 2S) started broadcasting. Until then, the sole television channel was seen as a propaganda instrument for the leading government of the time. This trend continued on RTS even after the introduction of private television. As of 2005, both RTS1 and 2sTV had educational content requirements.

The following is a list of television channels broadcast in Senegal.

== Main channels ==
Name	Owner	Type	Launched
RTS 1	RTS	Public-owned	1973
2sTV	El hadji Ibrahima NDIAYE	Private	2003
Radio Dunyaa Vision (RDV)	Excaf Telecom	Private	2006
Walf TV	Walfadjiri	Private	2006
Canal Info News	An Média	Private	2007
RTS 2 (SN2)	RTS	Public-owned	2008
TFM	Groupe Futurs Médias, Youssou N'Dour	Private	2010

== See also ==
- List of television stations in Africa: Senegal
- Khar Bii
- Media of Senegal
- List of newspapers in Senegal
