= List of television stations in Africa =

This is a list of television stations in Africa. Many African countries have various television stations both public and private in nature. The management of these stations vary across countries. In some parts of Africa, radio is a more common form of news and media; see the list of radio stations in Africa for more information.

== East Africa ==
=== Burundi ===
- BeTV
- Burundi National Radio and Television

=== Kenya ===
- Citizen TV
- K24 TV
- Kenya Television Network
- NTV
- TV47 Kenya

=== Rwanda ===
- ESPN Africa

=== South Sudan ===
- South Sudan Broadcasting Corporation

=== Tanzania ===
- Star TV
- Tanzania Broadcasting Corporation (TBC)
- Clouds TV
- Wasafi TV

=== Uganda ===
- Baba TV
- BBS Terefayina
- NBS Television
- NTV Uganda
- SEE TV
- Uganda Broadcasting Corporation (UBC)

== Central Africa ==
=== Cameroon ===
- Bnews1
- CAM 10 Television
- Cameroon Radio and Television (CRTV)
- Canal 2 International
- Danpullo Broadcasting System (DBS)
- Dash TV News
- Dash TV Sport & Entertainment
- Equinox TV
- LTM TV
- Spectrum Television (STV)
- Vision4 Television

=== Central African Republic ===
- Central African Republic Communications
- Digital TV (DTV)
- Télévision Centrafricaine

=== Chad ===
- Electron TV
- Télé Tchad
- Tchad 24

=== Equatorial Guinea ===
- Asonga Televisión
- TVGE

=== Gabon ===
- Kanal 7
- Label TV
- Nour TV
- RTG
- TV+

=== Republic of the Congo and Democratic Republic of Congo ===
- Antenne A
- B-one Télévision
- Canal Congo Télévision
- Canal Kin Télévision
- Digital Congo TV
- DRTV International
- Numerica
- RTNC
- Télé50
- Télé Congo

=== São Tomé and Príncipe ===
- RTP África
- RTP Internacional
- TVS-Televisao Santomense

== Horn of Africa ==
=== Djibouti ===
- Horn Cable Television
- Radio Television of Djibouti
- Sahal Cable TV
- Star Ocean Television

=== Eritrea ===
- Eri-TV
- Erisat

=== Ethiopia ===
- Addis Media Network
- Ahadu Television
- Amhara Media Corporation
- ARTS TV
- Asham TV
- Canal+ Cinema
- Canal+ Dik Dik
- Canal+ Discover
- Canal+ Gebeta
- Canal+ Jumbo
- Canal+ Novela
- Canal+ Sport
- Canal+ Ukishini
- Debub TV
- DW TV HD
- EBS HD
- EBS Cinema
- EBS Muskia
- ESAT
- ETV News HD
- ETV Afan Oromo (Oromo)
- ETV East HD
- ETV Entertainment HD
- ETV Languages HD
- ETV North HD
- ETV South HD
- ETV Sport
- ETV West HD
- ETV Yelijochalem
- Fana Broadcasting Corporate
- ARTS TV
- Bisrat TV
- Balageru TV
- TV 9 Ethio
- NBC ETHIOPIA
- Zee Alem
- Abol TV
- Hagerie TV
- Yegna TV
- Abbay Media
- Harari Television
- Kana TV
- JTV Ethiopia
- LTV
- Nabad TV (Somali)
- Nahoo TV
- New Africa TV
- Oromia Broadcasting Network (OBN)
- Oromia Media Network
- Oromia News Network
- Sidama Media Network
- Somali Region Television
- South TV
- Tigrai Media House
- Tigrai TV
- Walta TV
- Finfinnee integrated Broadcasting (FiB)

=== Republic of Somaliland ===
- Dayax Show
- Galaydh Media
- Hobaan Cable TV
- Horn Cable Television
- KF Media
- MM Somali TV
- SAAB TV
- Somali Cable TV
- Somali Society TV
- Somaliland National TV (SLNTV)

=== Somalia ===
- Dalka TV
- Eastern Television Network
- Goobjoog TV
- Horn Cable Television
- Jubbaland TV
- Kalsann TV
- Puntland TV
- Shabelle TV
- Somalia National Television
- Universal Television

== Indian Ocean islands ==
=== Comoros ===
- Office de radio et télévision des Comores (ORTC)

=== Madagascar ===
- Amitié Télévision
- AZ Radio Television
- Dream'in TV
- i-BC TV
- Kolo TV
- Malagasy Broadcasting System (MBS)
- MATV
- Radio-Television Analamanga (RTA)
- Real TV
- TV Plus
- Viva Madagascar

=== Mauritius ===
- Mauritius Broadcasting Corporation
- TéléPlus
- TOP TV

=== Seychelles ===
- Seychelles Broadcasting Corporation
- TéléSesel

== North Africa ==
=== Algeria ===
- TV1
- TV2 (French)
- TV3
- TV4
- TV5
- TV6
- TV7
- TV8
- TV9
- Dzair News
- Dzair TV
- Echourouk News
- Echourouk TV
- El Heddaf TV
- El Watan Al Djazairia
- Ennahar TV
- ENTV
- Hogar TV
- KBC TV

=== Egypt ===
- Aghapy TV
- Al Ahly TV
- Al Hayah
- Al Hayah Drama
- Al Nahar TV
- Al Nahar Drama
- Al-Nas TV
- Alexandria Channel
- Al Kahera Wal Nas
- Al Kahera Wal Nas 2
- Al-Qahera News
- Cairo Channel
- Cairo Cinema
- Cairo Cinema 2
- Cairo Drama
- Cairo Comedy
- Cairo Musalsalat
- Cairo Film
- Cairo Fight
- Cairo Zaman
- Canal Channel
- CBC TV
- CBC Drama
- CBC Sofra
- Channel 1
- Channel 2
- CTV (Egyptian TV channel)
- Delta Channel
- DMC TV
- DMC Drama
- Egypt Holy Quran
- Egyptian TV
- Extra News
- Extra Live
- Mazzika
- Mehwar TV
- Modern Sports
- Nile Cinema
- Nile Comedy
- Nile Culture
- Nile Drama
- Nile Educational
- Nile Family
- Nile Life
- Nile News
- Nile Sports
- Nile TV International
- Nogoum FM TV
- ON E
- ON Drama
- ON Sports
- ON Sports 2
- Panorama Film
- Panorama Action
- Panorama Drama
- Panorama Drama 2
- Panorama Comedy
- Sada El Balad
- Sada El Balad Drama
- Set El Bet
- Tanweer channel
- TeN TV
- Thebes Channel
- Upper Channel
- WATCH IT (streaming service)
- Zamalek TV

=== Libya ===
- 218TV
- Al-Jamahiriya TV
- Libya Al Ahrar TV
- Libya Febrayer TV
- Libya Mostakbal
- Libya National Channel (LNC)
- Libya Panorama Channel (LPC)
- Libya Rsmia
- Tanasoh TV
- Wasat TV

=== Morocco ===
- 2M TV
- 2M Monde
- Aflam TV
- Al Aoula
- Al Aoula Europe
- Al Aoula Middle East
- Al Maghribia
- Arrabia
- Arryadia
- Arryadia 2
- Arryadia TNT
- Assadissa
- Canal Atlas
- CHADATV
- Laayoune TV
- M24
- Medi1 TV Afrique
- Medi1 TV Arabic
- Medi1 TV Maghreb
- Tamazight TV
- Télé Maroc

=== Sahrawi Arab Democratic Republic ===
- RASD TV

=== Sudan ===
- Blue Nile TV
- Sudan TV

=== Tunisia ===
- Attessia TV
- El Watania 1
- El Watania 2
- Hannibal TV (Arabic)
- Nessma El Jadida
- Telvza TV (Arabic)

== Southern Africa ==
=== Angola ===
- Palanca TV
- FéTV
- My Channel Africa
- RTP África
- RTP Mundo
- TPA
- TV Zimbo

=== Botswana ===
- AccessTV
- BTV
- Hub TV
- Khuduga HD
- Maru TV
- Now Channel (formerly Now TV)
- YTV (formerly eBotswana)

=== Eswatini ===
- Eswatini TV
- Channel Yemaswati

=== Malawi ===
- Great Dominion Television
- Malawi Broadcasting Corporation
- Mibawa Television
- Rainbow Television
- Times Television
- Zodiak TV

=== Mozambique ===
- EcoTV
- Media Mais TV
- RTP Africa
- RTP Mundo
- Soico Televisão (STV)
- STV Notícias
- Televisão de Moçambique (TVM)
- TOP TV
- TV Sucesso
- TV Miramar
- TuaTV

=== Namibia ===
- Namibian Broadcasting Corporation
- One Africa Television

=== South Africa ===
- SuperSport
- Cape Town TV
- e.tv
- GauTV
- M-Net
- Mpuma Kapa TV
- MYtv (formerly ASTV)
- Newzroom Afrika
- Nongoma TV
- MYtv
- Rising Sun TV.
- SABC
- Soweto TV
- Tshwane TV
- 1KZN.

=== Zambia ===
- African Agri-Business Network (ABN)
- Catholic Television
- Central Africa Media Network (CAMNET)
- Chipata TV
- City TV
- Copperbelt TV
- Covenant Broadcasting Company (CBC)
- Crown TVd
- Diamond TV
- Fresh Television
- Hope Channel
- Kenmark Broadcasting Network (KBN TV)
- KNC Television
- Kopala Television
- Life TV
- Mozo Television
- Muvi TV
- North West Television
- Power Television
- Prime TV Zambia
- Revelation Television
- Spring24 TV
- Trinity Broadcasting Network (TBN)
- Q Television
- Zambia National Broadcasting Corporation (ZNBC)
- Zed TV

=== Zimbabwe ===
- 1st TV (defunct)
- 3Ktv
- Channel D
- KeYona TV
- Kumba TV
- NRTV
- ZBC TV
- ZTN Prime

== West Africa ==
=== Benin ===
- Canal 3
- Eden TV
- E-Télé
- Golfe TV Africa
- ORTB
- TV Carrefour

=== Burkina Faso ===
- 3TV
- BF1
- Burkina Info TV
- Canal 3
- LCA TV
- Radio Télévision du Burkina (RTB)
- Savane TV
- Télévision Omega
- TV Al Houda
- TVZ Africa

=== Cape Verde ===
- RecordTV Cabo Verde
- RTC
- RTP África
- RTP Mundo
- Televisão Independente de Cabo Verde (TIVER)

=== Côte d'Ivoire ===
- La Nouvelle Chaine Ivoirienne
- Life TV
- Radio Télévision Ivoirienne
- 7 news

=== Gambia ===
- Banjul TV
- DSTV Gambia
- Eye Africa TV
- Eye Africa TV 2
- Gambia Radio & Television Service (GRTS)
- Paradise TV
- QTV Gambia
- Star TV

=== Ghana ===
- Adom TV
- Atinka TV
- Citi TV
- e.tv Ghana
- Ewenyigba TV
- Ghana Broadcasting Corporation
- GHOne TV
- GTV
- Joy News
- Kessben TV
- Metro TV
- Multi TV
- NET 2 Television
- TOP TV
- TV Africa
- TV3
- UTV Ghana
- Channel 1

=== Guinea ===
- Espace TV
- Kaback TV
- Radio Télévision Guinéenne
- Star21 TV

=== Guinea Bissau ===
- Guinea-Bissau Television
- RTP África
- RTP Mundo

=== Liberia ===
- Liberia National Television (LNTV)
- Power TV

=== Mali ===
- Africable
- Alafia TV
- Bèlèdougou TV
- Liberté Télévision
- M7 TV
- Mousso TV
- Nieta TV
- Office de Radiodiffusion Television du Mali (ORTM)
- TM2
- Renouveau TV

=== Mauritania ===
- Elmourabiton TV
- Sahel TV
- TV de Mauritanie

=== Niger ===
- Bonferey
- Canal 3 Niger
- Dounia TV
- Niger24 TV
- Office of Radio and Television of Niger (ORTN)
- Radio Television Labari
- Radio-Télévision Ténéré
- Tambara TV
- Tauraruwa TV

=== Nigeria ===
- 1TV Network
- AIT
- Africa Magic
- AKBC
- Al-Ansar Radio and TV
- Arewa 24
- Arise News
- Borno Radio Television (BRTV)
- Degue Broadcasting Network (DBN TV)
- Channels TV
- Emmanuel TV
- Galaxy Television
- Heritage Global Academy TV
- ITV Benin
- KAFTAN TV
- Koga TV
- Lagos Television
- Liberty TV
- Minaj Systems Tv Obosi
- Minaj Broadcast Network Obosi
- Minaj Broadcasting International (MBI)
- Murhi International Television (MITV)
- News Central Media
- Nigerian Television Authority
- Odenigbo FM Obosi Anambra state
- Ogun State Television
- Ondo State Radiovision Corporation
- Orient TV
- Plus TV Africa
- Rahma TV
- Rave TV
- Rivers State Television
- Silverbird Television
- Soundcity TV
- TVC Entertainment
- Trust TV
- TVC News
- WAP TV
- Wazobia TV

=== Senegal ===
- 2sTV
- 7TV
- Africa7
- DTV
- iTV
- Label TV
- Leral TV
- Radio Dunyaa Vision (RDV)
- Radiodiffusion Télévision Sénégalaise (RTS)
- SenTV
- TFM
- Walf TV

=== Sierra Leone ===
- Sierra Leone Broadcasting Corporation (SLBC)
- Star TV

=== Togo ===
- One TV
- Radio Télévision Delta Santé
- Télévision Espoir 47
- Togolese Television
- TV2
- TV Sept
- World TV

== See also ==
- List of radio stations in Africa
- List of Berber-language television channels
