= List of programs broadcast by SIC =

This is a list of television programs currently broadcast (in first-run or reruns), scheduled to be broadcast or formerly broadcast on SIC.

== Current programming ==
=== Original programming ===
==== News and information ====
- Primeiro Jornal (1995 – present)
- Jornal da Noite (1992 – present)
- Manhã SIC Notícias (simulcast with SIC Notícias) (2008 – present)

==== Telenovelas ====
- Vitória (September 22, 2025 – present)

==== Talk shows ====
- Casa Feliz (2020 – present)
- Júlia (October 2018 – present)
- Domingão (2020 – present)

==== Annual events ====
- Golden Globes (1995 – present)

==== Others ====
- Cartaz Cultural (2005 – present)
- Etnias (2006 – present)
- Episódio Especial (February 23, 2008 – present)
- Fama Show (March 2, 2008 – present)
- Alta Definição (2009 – present)
- Totoloto (2011 – present)

==== Kids ====
- Uma Aventura (reruns)

=== Acquired programming ===
==== Telenovelas ====
- Êta Mundo Melhor! (November 2025 – present)

==== Documentaries ====
- Vida Selvagem (1995 – present, formerly BBC Vida Selvagem)

== Former programming ==
=== Telenovelas ===
- Mar Salgado (September 15, 2014 – 2015)

=== Talent shows ===
- Factor X (October 6, 2013 – present)

=== Reality shows ===
- Senhora Dona Lady (September 2005)

=== Game shows ===
- Responder à Letra (October 6, 1992 – 1993)

=== Talk shows ===
- Sextas Mágicas (2013 – 2014)
- A Vida nas Cartas - O Dilema (2013 – 2017)
- Portugal em Festa (June 2013 – 2016)
- Querida Manhãs (February 3, 2014 – 2019)
- Grande Tarde (October 6, 2014 – 2016)

=== Others ===
- Cartaz Cultural (2005 – 2022)

=== Kids ===
- Disney Kids (2001 – 2015) (block with Disney Channel/Disney XD shows)
- LOL@SIC (2011 – 2015) (block with kids shows)

=== Acquired programming ===
==== News and information ====
- Praça Pública

==== Telenovelas ====
- Amor à Vida (September 2, 2013 – present)
- Senhora do Destino (October 7, 2013 – present)
- Em Família (March 31, 2014 – present)
- Lado a Lado (September 8, 2014 – present)
- Império (October 13, 2014 – present)

==== TV shows/sitcoms ====
- Guys Next Door (1992)
- The Blacklist (October 12, 2013 – present)
- Criminal Minds (2014 – present)

==== Documentaries ====
- BBC Vida Selvagem (1995 – present)

==== Kids ====
- Mako Mermaids (2013 – 2015)
- Yu-Gi-Oh! 5D's (2014 – present) (part of LOL@SIC)
- Lego Ninjago (2014 – present) (part of LOL@SIC)
- Pac-Man and the Ghostly Adventures (2014 – present) (part of LOL@SIC)
- Sam Fox: Extreme Adventures (2014 – present)
