= Gloria Guissou =

Burkinabé karateka (born 1995)

Gloria Rachel Noela Guissou Kabré (born 24 December 1995) is a Burkinabé karateka and women's rights activist who was named Yennenga of the Year in 2023 for her work on promoting and developing female talent in sports in Burkina Faso. In 2019, she became the first Burkinabé woman to earn a medal at the African Games.

== Sports career ==
Guissou's father, Clément Guissou, was a master karateka and karate coach, who started training his daughter when she was five. Between 2012 and 2020, Guissou was Burkina Faso's national champion in the 68 kg category. At the 2019 African Games in Rabat, Morocco, Guissou earned a bronze medal after defeating Thabang Mosa Maleke from Botswana by 11 to 7 in the kumite +68 kg category. Guissou became the first Burkinabé woman to earn a medal at the African Games, and additionally was the first Burkinabé athlete, male or female, to earn a medal for karate. In recognition of her achievement, the Association of Sports Journalists of Burkina named her as the best karateka of 2019, as well as one of the top athletes of the year.

The government of Burkina Faso subsequently offered Guissou the opportunity to train in Europe, and Guissou expressed hope to participate in the 2020 Olympic Games in Tokyo, Japan. Guissou opted to remain in Burkina Faso after getting married, and after the 2020 Olympics were delayed to the COVID-19 pandemic, she publicly stated her uncertainty as to whether she would qualify, citing her husband's reluctance to wait another year before having a child.

== Activism ==
Guissou gained greater recognition in Burkina Faso following her African Games success, and subsequently spoke out in favour of gender equality in sports, criticising Burkinabé sporting associations for sending twice as many men to international sporting events than women, despite female Burkinabé athletes statistically earning twice as many medals as their male counterparts. Guissou also criticised cultural norms that led to the stigmatising of women in sport, including stating that her mother had been reluctant to permit Guissou to train as a karateka due to concerns it would negatively impact upon her marriage prospects.

Guissou subsequently set up a karate school for girls, as well as a local women's karate team, at the Avenir Karate Club in Paspanga.

In November 2021, Guissou established RINGO, a sports association that aimed to support female athletes both practically and mentally when participating in international competitions. RINGO has gone on to expand its scope, including in 2024 launching an initiative to teach self-defence skills to Burkinabé women in all of the country's regions, citing gender violence that prevailed in Burkina Faso.

In addition to her sports work and activism, Guissou obtained a master's degree in water, hygiene and sanitation in the international cooperation sector from Ouagadougou Youth Polytechnic School. She interned with the European Union mission in Burkina Faso, and spent six months working as a chemist consultant in Mali.

== Recognition ==
In 2023, Guissou was named as Yennenga of the Year by Canal+ Burkina, in recognition of her work promoting and developing female talents in sport.
