= RTS 2 =

RTS 2 may refer to:

- RTS 2 (Senegalese TV channel)
- RTS 2 (Serbian TV channel)
- RTS 2 (Swiss TV channel)
