= Pop Up Party =

African television series

Pop Up Party is Cartoon Network's first African production in collaboration with Urban Brew Studios, and airs on DStv, channel 301 across the African continent. It is a series of short, five-minute episodes featuring a group of young African dancers as they pop up across adult locations and interrupt with a dance, inviting everyone to join in on the fun. It was renewed for a second season in which a group of kids have a dance off that included secret challenges. The live-action show premiered on 23 July 2016.
