= RTS 1 =

RTS 1 may refer to:

- RTS 1 (Senegalese TV channel)
- RTS 1 (Serbian TV channel)
- RTS 1 (Swiss TV channel)
