= New Loud Rockets =

- Origin: Cape Town, South Africa
- Genres: Indie
- Years active: 2006–2009
- Past members: John Seth, Jadan McCullough, Steve Huson, David Huson, Philip Erasmus

New Loud Rockets were an indie band from Cape Town, South Africa.

The band consisted of John Seth (vocals and keyboard), Jadan McCullough (guitar), Steve Huson (lead guitar), David Huson (bass guitar), and Philip Erasmus (drums). Active since early 2006, New Loud Rockets released their first EP Let's Play House (2007).

== History ==
The idea for the band came together when members Jadan McCullough and David Huson started playing together while attending school at South African College Schools (SACS). They were later joined by fellow schoolmates John Seth and David's younger brother Stephen to form New Loud Rockets in mid-2006. Philip Erasmus later joined the group after attending one of the band's first gigs in Cape Town.

== Let's Play House (2007) ==
The band's debut EP, Let's Play House, recorded at Rockitdog Studios and produced by Andrew "Lappies" Loubser of Slingshot Productions, was released in late 2007. Their first single, "Bleeding in a Cab" (also the first song the band ever wrote together), received attention with airplay on 5FM and various local radio stations. The music video for "Bleeding in a Cab", directed by Dylan Culhane, received rotation on the South African music channel MK89 and was featured on The Showbiz Report on the Etv channel.

The group disbanded in early 2009.
