= Cantor ou Impostor? =

Portuguese television game show

- Genre: Game show
- Based on: I Can See Your Voice by CJ ENM
- Directed by: Nuno Garcia; Daniel Oliveira
- Presented by: Cláudia Vieira
- Starring: João Manzarra; Débora Monteiro; Rui Unas
- Country of origin: Portugal
- Original language: Portuguese
- No. of episodes: 8

Production
- Executive producers: Pedro Cardoso; Daniel Cruzeiro
- Producers: Paula Carvalho; Celia Costa; Micael Reis; Cristina Verdú
- Camera setup: Multi-camera
- Production company: Warner Bros. International Television Production

Original release
- Network: SIC
- Release: 17 July – 4 September 2022

Related
- I Can See Your Voice franchise

Cantor ou Impostor? (transl. Singer or impostor?) is a Portuguese television mystery music game show based on the South Korean programme I Can See Your Voice, featuring its format where a guest artist and a contestant attempt to eliminate bad singers from the group, until the last mystery singer remains for a duet performance. It premiered on SIC on 17 July 2022.

== Gameplay ==
=== Format ===
Over the course of five rounds, the guest artist and contestant must attempt to eliminate bad singers from a group of seven "mystery singers", identified only by their occupation or alias, without ever hearing them perform live. They are assisted by clues regarding the singers' backgrounds, style of performance, and observations from a celebrity panel. At the end of a game, the last remaining mystery singer is revealed as either good or bad by means of a duet between them and one of the guest artists.

The contestant must eliminate one mystery singer at the end of each round, receiving €1,000 if they eliminate a bad singer. At the end of a game, if the contestant decides to walk away, they will keep the money had won in previous rounds; if they decide to risk for the last remaining mystery singer, they double their all winnings if a singer is good, or give it anyway to the winning bad singer selected by them.

=== Rounds ===
1. First impression (Portuguese: Primeiras impressões)
  The guest artist and contestant are given some time to observe and examine each mystery singer based on their appearance.
2. Lip sync (Portuguese: Sincronia labial)
  Each mystery singer performs a lip sync to a song; good singers mime to a recording of their own, while bad singers mime to a backing track by another vocalist.
3. True or false? (Portuguese: Verdadeiro ou falso?)
  The guest artist and contestant are presented with a video package containing possible clues by one of the mystery singers of their choice.
4. Interrogation (Portuguese: Interrogatório)
  The guest artist and contestant may ask questions to the remaining mystery singers. Good singers are required to give truthful responses, while the bad singers must lie.
5. Concealed voice (Portuguese: Voz secreta)
  The mystery singer lip syncs to the good singer's recording, then a bad singer's recording comes in the middle of the performance.

== Production ==
Following the success of A Máscara, Impresa formally acquired the rights to produce a Portuguese adaptation of I Can See Your Voice for SIC's 30th anniversary programming lineup in February 2022, with Warner Bros. International Television Production assigning on production duties.

== Episodes ==
Legend:
Good singer
Bad singer
— The contestant chose to risk the money.
— The contestant chose to walk away with the money.

Episode		Guest artist (Note: Players' notes: For the returning guest artists (who also include foreigners and former good singers), names are displayed in italics.; For the mixed groups, names who identified as bad singers are displayed in italics.)	Contestant	Mystery singers (In their respective numbers and aliases)						
#	Date	Guest artist	Contestant	Elimination order						Winner
#	Date	Guest artist	Contestant	First impression	Lip sync		True or false?	Interrogation	Concealed voice	Winner
1	17 July 2022	Rita Guerra	Bárbara Guimarães → €6,000	7. Célia Teixeira; (Equestrienne)	2. Carlos Carriço; (Waiter)	5. Gilma Santos; (Vegetable Vendor)	6. Arménio Pimenta; (Goalkeeper)	4. Marco Amaral; (Barber)	1. Daniela Sá; (Secretary)	3. Luísa Amorim; Journalist
2	24 July 2022	Pedro Tatanka (The Black Mamba)	João Baião → €8,000	2. César Augusto; (Librarian)	3. Rodrigo Marinho; (Courier)	6. Daniela Gonçalves; (Swimmer)	7. Tomás de Almeida; (Sculptor)	4. Teresa Monsanto; (Make-up Artist)	1. Nádia Mendez; (Zumba Instructor)	5. Nuno Casais; Motorcycle Rider
3	31 July 2022	Anselmo Ralph (Note: Foreign guest artist: Angola — Anselmo Ralph)	Melânia Gomes → €3,000	7. Vasco Pinto; (Mechanic)	3. André Mexia; (Fisherman)	1. Manel Pedro Silva; (Tour Guide)	2. Ana Patrícia Sanganha; (Teacher)	4. Maria Duarte; (Pin-up Model)	5. Nuno Mendes; (Chef)	6. Inês Guedes; Nurse
4	7 August 2022	Ana Bacalhau	César Mourão → €8,000	3. Carlota David; (Gymnast)	2. Francisco Ribeiro; (Scientist)	5. Luísa Trevo; (University Student)	1. Siobhan Fernandes; (Hairdresser)	6. Rebeca Reinaldo; (Painter)	7. Renato Santos; (Cyclist)	4. Nelson dos Anjos; Gardener
5	14 August 2022	Miguel Gameiro (Pólo Norte)	Andréia Rodrigues → €3,000	2. Maria Flor; (P.E. Teacher)	3. Mariana Mateus; (Photographer)	5. Wellington Amaral; (Yoga Master)	4. Ângelo Luis; (Pharmacist)	7. Beatriz Jacinto; (Florist)	6. Ana Ferreira; (Veterinarian)	1. Joana Pacheco; Soldier
6	21 August 2022	Sónia Tavares	Dr. Almeida Nunes → €8,000	3. Francisco Oliveira; (Water Polo Player)	1. Ana Penteado; (Personal Trainer)	5. Bia Archer; (Lawyer)	6. Rui Leitão; (Farmer)	4. Veronica Haluzynska; (Fashion Designer)	7. Martinho Carvalho; (Dental Assistant)	2. Rui Serrinha; Scout
7	28 August 2022	José Cid	José Figueiras → €10,000	6. Duarte Carrasco; (Golfer)	4. Sérgio Oliveira; (Clown)	7. Ana Ribeiro; (Psychologist)	5. Filipa Saavedra; (Beautician)	3. Ângela Silva; (Acrobat)	2. Sandra Nunes; (Cashier)	1. Ricardo Luiz; Businessman
8	4 September 2022	Ivo Lucas	Diana Chaves → €0	4. Valentina Saraiva; (Excursionist)	1. Elsa Gomes; (Taxi Driver)	6. Raissa Bhering; (Model)	2. João Miguel; (Skater)	7. Madalena Silva; (Surfer)	3. Giulia Silva; (Stewardess)	5. Selma Rodrigues; Holistic Therapist

== Reception ==
Legend:
Highest rated episode
Lowest rated episode

No.	Title	Air date	Timeslot (WEST)	Rating			Share			Viewership			Ref(s)
No.	Title	Air date	Timeslot (WEST)	Start	Mid	Close	Start	Mid	Close	Start	Mid	Close	Ref(s)
1	"Rita Guerra"	17 July 2022	Sunday, 20:15	8.3%	9.7%	8.3%	17.5%	23%	21.2%	0.79	0.821	0.785	
2	"Pedro Tatanka"	24 July 2022	Sunday, 20:15	7.6%	9.1%	6.9%	15.9%	20.3%	17.7%	0.718	0.821	0.658	
3	"Anselmo Ralph"	31 July 2022	Sunday, 20:15	7.6%	8.2%	6.2%	16.9%	17.8%	16%	0.717	0.729	0.583	
4	"Ana Bacalhau"	7 August 2022	Sunday, 20:15	7.7%	8.4%	6.8%	16.7%	19%	17.7%	0.728	0.76	0.642	
5	"Miguel Gameiro"	14 August 2022	Sunday, 20:15	7.2%	7%	5.6%	16.7%	17%	15.3%	0.684	0.665	0.533	
6	"Sónia Tavares"	21 August 2022	Sunday, 20:15	8.3%	9.1%	7%	17.3%	18.8%	17.3%	0.788	0.863	0.664	
7	"José Cid"	28 August 2022	Sunday, 20:15	6.7%	8.6%	6.8%	14%	18.4%	16.8%	0.63	0.723	0.645	
8	"Ivo Lucas"	4 September 2022	Sunday, 20:15	9%	6.9%	5.5%	19.3%	17.8%	19.2%	0.849	0.649	0.523	

Source: CAEM
