= He's a Lady =

American reality television series

- Genre: Reality television
- Presented by: Tony Frassrand
- Country of origin: United States
- Original language: English
- No. of seasons: 1
- No. of episodes: 6

Production
- Executive producers: Douglas Ross; Tom Campbell
- Production location: Los Angeles
- Running time: 45–46 minutes
- Production companies: Evolution Film & Tape; Full Circle Entertainment

Original release
- Network: TBS
- Release: October 19 – November 23, 2004

He's a Lady is an American reality television series broadcast by TBS. The six-episode series premiered on October 19, 2004, and concluded on November 23, 2004. Filmed in Los Angeles, California, the series depicted eleven cisgender men in competition for a $250,000 reward over who could pass themselves off as a more convincing woman. The contestants were required to cross-dress and adopt feminine personas, which were then introduced to their family and friends. The contestants additionally competed in weekly challenges that required them to embrace femininity. The competition culminated in a beauty pageant, which was judged by a celebrity panel. The series was hosted by American television presenter Tony Frassrand.

He's a Lady was a part of TBS's intent to capitalize on a rising interest in LGBT-themed reality television shows. The series was met with unfavorable reviews by critics, who believed that, despite an interesting concept, the series was poorly executed. He's a Lady additionally received fierce criticism from the American Family Association, a Christian fundamentalist organization, who urged the series' sponsors to pull their advertisements and financial support due to concerns of misandry. The series premiered to 1.70 million viewers, although its viewership quickly waned over the course of the season. In 2004, He's a Lady was the subject of a copyright infringement lawsuit filed against TBS and production company Evolution Film & Tape.

== Format ==
Contestant Michael pictured before (left) and after (right) his transformation into "Scarlet"

Set in Los Angeles, the six-episode series depicted eleven cisgender men in competition for a reward of $250,000. The contestants initially believed that they were competing in a fitness competition titled All American Man; upon arrival, they learned that they would be required to cross-dress in an effort to pass themselves off as women. The contestants, who adopted feminine personas, were required to move into a boisterous, pink-and-purple dwelling referred to as "The Doll House". In an effort to "live as a lady," the contestants were taught about brassieres and jewelry in addition to competing in weekly gender-specific challenges; challenges included modeling, wedding planning, serving as a bridesmaid, and household chores. A contestant was eliminated from the competition each week at the discretion of a celebrity panel, which included Morgan Fairchild, Debbie Matenopoulos, and John Salley. At the culmination of the series, the finalists competed in a beauty pageant, in which they had to explain what they "learned about being a man" over the course of the competition. The series was hosted by American television presenter Tony Frassrand.

== Production ==
The show was green-lit by TBS in early 2004 and production began shortly afterward. According to Steve Koonin, executive vice president of TBS, the network hoped the show and The Real Gilligan's Island would "pioneer a genre we call comedic reality". A TBS spokesperson claimed the show was meant to show how gender roles function in society while executive producer Tom Campbell hoped the hypermasculine contestants would become more sensitive to women's needs. The show was filmed in Los Angeles over a three-week period. On August 27, 2004, TBS sent out a press release which announced the show's premiere date as October 12, 2004. However, the show was briefly delayed and instead premiered on October 19, 2004.

The series was filmed in Los Angeles, California, over the course of three weeks. The press release described the series' premise as "11 macho men [who are given] the opportunity to walk a mile in women’s shoes". Speaking on his experience, contestant Ryan Katz stated: "[He's a Lady] was terrifying, tumultuous; it took my testosterone away. It was something I've never experienced."

Following the recent controversies and cancellations of other LGBT-themed reality television programs, executive producers Campbell and Douglas Ross were "anxious" to not offend the LGBT community. The producers were specifically concerned about the series' perceived depiction of transgender people and they did not want the contestants to "equate the change of gender with a change of sexual orientation." The network offered the media monitoring organization GLAAD an advance copy of the series for review, however, GLAAD later claimed that they were the ones to reach out to producers after examination of the series' press release. GLAAD was concerned about the series' portrayal of LGBT people and wanted to ensure that it depicted LGBT representation more tactfully than the cancelled Fox special Seriously, Dude, I'm Gay. Through their consultation with GLAAD, Campbell claimed that the organization helped the producers to "bec[o]me more aware of transgender issues and the double standards of beauty." One of the changes that producers implemented was using the phrase "in character" as opposed to "in drag" when they referred to the contestants' personas.

== Episodes ==
No.	Title	Original release date	US viewers (millions)
1	"Episode 1"	October 19, 2004	1.70
The eleven contestants arrive to Los Angeles and undergo transformations into their feminine personas. Four of the men are eliminated from the competition.
2	"Episode 2"	October 26, 2004	N/A
The seven remaining contestants get settled into their new residence, the Doll House, and undergo "lady boot camp" to learn conventional feminine behavior.
3	"Episode 3"	November 2, 2004	N/A
The six remaining contestants participate in a modeling boot camp, which includes a yoga ballet exercise and beachwear modeling.
4	"Episode 4"	November 9, 2004	N/A
The five remaining contestants are required to plan a real wedding for a couple, in which they will serve as bridesmaids.
5	"Episode 5"	November 16, 2004	N/A
The four remaining contestants return to their hometowns to complete a series of household chores; the men additionally learn to bake an apple pie and model lingerie.
6	"Episode 6"	November 23, 2004	N/A
The competition's three finalists compete in a beauty pageant, with a winner chosen at the discretion of the celebrity panel.

== Reception ==
He's a Lady drew sharp criticism from Christian fundamentalist organizations, including the American Family Association and the Traditional Values Coalition. The American Family Association claimed that the show was humorless and promoted "life as a transvestite" while the Traditional Values Coalition similarly condemned it as a "new homosexual-inspired transvestite show." The organizations called for a boycott of He's a Lady, in which they urged its sponsors to drop the series. S. C. Johnson & Son, who served as the series' principal sponsor, pulled their advertising and financial support due to pressure from the organizations.

== Lawsuit ==
On November 23, 2004, He's a Lady was subject to a lawsuit filed by screenwriters John Phillips and Derek Gerard. Known as Phillips v. Turner Broadcasting System, the suit was filed in the United States District Court for the Central District of California and targeted the series' production company, Evolution Film & Tape, alongside the series' network, TBS. The plaintiffs sought a reward of $3,000,000, in which they alleged copyright infringement, breach of implied-in-fact contract, and unfair competition. The plaintiffs claimed that their script Sex Change, which was previously pitched to TBS, was copied by the production company and network for He's a Lady. The concept of Sex Change was based on Phillips's experience as an "all-American" athlete who later underwent gender-affirming surgery; he claimed that the production company and network "stole part of my life" with the production of He's a Lady. The plaintiffs and Evolution Film & Tape previously shared the same booking agent, Cal Boyington. On October 3, 2005, the court dismissed the suit with prejudice; the parties bore their own legal costs and fees.

== International Versions ==
A Portuguese version under the name Senhora Dona Lady (Lady Dona Lady) hosted by Herman José & Sílvia Alberto aired on SIC from September 16 until September 27, 2005.

A Russian version aired on Russian channel TNT.

== See also ==
- Cross-dressing in film and television
