= Khar Bii =

- Genre: Reality television
- Created by: Marianne Bathily
- Presented by: Mactar Seck Ngaay 2009-2011 Edouard 2010 Kocc 2012-2014
- Country of origin: Senegal
- Original language: Wolof
- No. of seasons: 6

Original release
- Network: 2sTV
- Release: 2009 – 2014

Khar Bii ("This Sheep" in Wolof) is a television show that has aired annually on 2sTV in Senegal since 2009. As of 2012, it was the most popular show in Senegal. The show is a contest to locate the most beautiful ram in the country and airs each year in the lead-up to the Muslim holiday Eid al-Adha (known locally as Tabaski).

Sheep play an important role in Senegalese culture. They are popular pets, often living inside their owners' homes. In addition, sheep are important to the festival of Eid al-Adha, which commemorates Abraham's near sacrifice of his son (and ultimate sacrifice of a ram in Isaac's place). Nearly every Senegalese Muslim family with sufficient resources sacrifices a sheep to celebrate Eid al-Adha; over 700,000 sheep are purchased annually for this purpose.

The show's creator, Marianne Bathily, aimed to create a spectacle akin to an American dog show. Khar Bii follows judges (breeders and veterinarians) who visit homes across the country, selecting rams to compete in televised regional competitions. Later, the regional finalists compete in a national contest in Dakar's Place de l'Obélisque. Judges examine rams for symmetry of horns and testicles, a balanced face, a shiny coat, and a healthy, hefty weight. The ram's gait is also considered. The winner of the competition receives 2,000,000 francs (approximately US$4,000), as well as the potential for future income through breeding of the winning ram. Khar Bii also incorporates a women's mutton cooking competition. (Prize-quality rams, like those competing in Khar Bii, are used for breeding rather than for food.) 2009 winner is Mandela 2010 Magal from rufisque 2011 Tidjane From Liberte 2012 Boy serere From Niarry tally 2013 Magal from Mbour and 2014 Alboury from Medina
