= Ponto de Encontro =

Ponto de Encontro (Meeting Point) is a Portuguese television series that reunited people with long-lost families and friends. It was produced in the 1990s for SIC TV channel.

== History ==
The format premiered at 22:15 on October 27, 1994, being in the same line as Perdoa-me and All You Need is Love. In 1995 it moved to Monday nights. Before its creation it was part of another program, Casos de Polícia, by April 1995, it had become the second most-watched program. By then, more than 10,000 letters to the production of the program hadn't been dispatched yet. Some of the cases shown in the program were staged.
