= Spanish television in Portugal =

The reception of Spanish television in Portugal refers to the reception of terrestrial television signals reaching the Portuguese border via overspill. Such reception reached its apex in the 1980s in order to provide viewers an alternative to the two RTP channels, which were viewed by the population of the time as being somewhat unappealing and accused of being "his master's voice".

== History ==
=== Early years ===
Television arrived to Portugal in 1957 and was received within its borders through five full-power transmitters. The existing transmitter network created a few gaps, especially in border areas, where TVE had better reception (by 1963). These areas included parts of Castelo Branco and Faro; in the latter district, some sets already turned their antennas towards Spain, which had a better transmission network. RTP was trying to find ways to increase its national transmitter network in order to achieve total coverage in the mainland. Madeira only had a television station in 1972, but had picked up signals from TVE Canarias from the Canary Islands since 1964, depending on tropospheric conditions. Since there was no local television station at the time, few people owned a television set.

=== Apex and illegal transmitter network ===
In the early 1980s, the reception of Spanish terrestrial television signals increased significantly, as new transmitters were established, attempting to reach areas beyond the border, especially in northern Portugal. These transmitters started in 1980 in the Alto Minho and Porto regions, though they were viewed as a sign of piracy. The usage of relays to broadcast foreign television channels at the time was considered illegal by the Geneva Convention on copyright.

A transmitter was installed in Espinho, in the northwest of Aveiro district, ahead of the 1982 FIFA World Cup. TVE had more matches than RTP, and, in general, TVE had more airtime to sports broadcasts than RTP's channels. The initial motivation was to lure viewers to its sports programming, especially in cafés. At the time, other relay stations were installed, which, in general, had the involvement of local governments and technicians. Initially, there were plans to install the relay on UHF, but due to technical problems, the relay was only possible on VHF, which was the band where TVE1 was located. In March 1984, the Espinho relay station planned to install a relay for TVE2 if sufficient capital allowed.

One TVE1 relay, the one in Porto, was used on 12 February 1984 to carry the signals of a pirate television station, TV Maravilha, whose only broadcasts consisted of a test card announcing regular broadcasts, which ultimately never started. Espinho installed a TVE2 relay on UHF channel 29 on 9 November 1985.

When SIC was in its early creation stages, founder Francisco Pinto Balsemão said that such relays, as well as those of satellite channels, were seen as a threat to Portuguese culture and national identity.

The success of Spanish TV relays led to the establishment of an ephemerous association, Associação de Repetidores de Televisão da Região Norte (Association of Television Relayers of the Northern Region). This was created to counter repeated attacks from CTT's Radioelectric Services, who switched off relays and pirate television stations one by one, as RTP at the time was the only broadcaster to legally operate television services in Portugal. One of the measures was to protest the closure of a TVE relay station in Póvoa de Varzim in 1984, and to prevent the closure of a relay station near Guimarães, where businesses specialized in TV sets and antennas would fear a fall in their revenue. The Socialist Party presented a planned law (100/V) in 1987 to liberalize the installation of individual and collective satellite dishes. Such plan would also criticize the government's repressive measures towards Spanish relay stations, such as the one in Fafe. The plan was rejected in January 1988 by the PSD government. The Espinho transmitter was shut down in May 1987. A meeting in November was held to discuss the situation in order to reinstall the equipment that was "illicitly" aprehended by the authorities.

Outside of the relays, Spanish television still had a sizable amount of viewers in border areas where overspill signals are received.

=== Digital terrestrial television ===
Digital terrestrial signals via overspill are still a viable option in border areas. The penetration of such signals is often seen as an advantage to local viewers, who criticize the local platform in having a limited channel offer.
