= DRTV International =

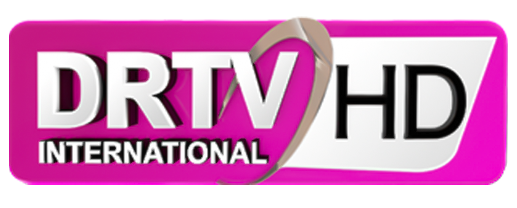
- Country: Congo
- Broadcast area: Worldwide
- Headquarters: Brazzaville

Programming
- Picture format: 16:9

Ownership
- Owner: Norbert Dabira

History
- Launched: 28 November 2002

Links
- Website: https://www.drtv.cg

DRTV International is the first private TV Channel in the Republic of the Congo, established on 28 November 2002.

== See also ==
- List of television stations in Africa
