= TV3 (Czech TV channel) =

- Country: Czech Republic
- Broadcast area: Czech Republic

Programming
- Picture format: 576i (SDTV 4:3)

Ownership
- Owner: RTV Galaxie

History
- Launched: 25 May 2000
- Closed: 18 December 2001

Availability (at time of closure)

Terrestrial
- UHF: 64 UHF Prague, Hradec Králové

TV3 is a Czech free-to-air television channel. The network closed down in December 2001 after its broadcast license was revoked.

== History ==
TV3 was launched on 25 May 2000 using the regional frequencies of former television channel Galaxie. Its terrestrial coverage was limited to North and East Bohemia, reaching the rest of the country by cable. It started broadcasting at 7:00PM local time with a 60-minute regional newscast followed by the film Seductive Beauty. Its programming included regional breaking news programming with reporters on motorbikes and the purchase of the rights to show WWE Friday Night SmackDown in 2001. The station used the tag called "television for the new millennium" for its promotion, with its target audience skewed towards a young male audience. Its opening night was hit by technical glitches during the launch of its newscast.

Soon after broadcasting, TV3 was ordered to take down all billboard advertising which related to a black boxer on a boxing ring floor being targeted by two white soldiers holding guns and looking at the boxer, alongside the word "Infozabava" ("Infotainment"). The advertisement was considered racist by the Advertising Board. The soldiers represented information and the boxer, entertainment. TV3 denied racist messages, contrary to the Advertising Board, and planned to stage a protest over the issue.

TV3 was initially only available in Prague and Hradec Králové on analogue terrestrial television. The channel applied for licenses to increase its coverage area in the country, including initially to Karlovy Vary, Ostrava and České Budějovice. However the Czech Radio and Television Broadcasting Council in 2001 blocked their requests.

In June 2001, Vladimír Železný, a Czech television tycoon and former owner of TV Nova, held discussions with the three main free-to-air channels in the Czech Republic, TV Nova, TV Prima and TV3 about the suggestion of a merger. However, such a deal would have been considered illegal by the Czech Government.

In September 2001, the Czech Radio and Television Broadcasting Council refused a request from European Media Ventures and Martin Kindernay to transfer TV3's licence to a Luxembourg-based company, KTV, which EMV wanted to own TV3's licence. The council did allow the move of the licence to RTV Galaxie, completely owned by Kindernay. The decision angered EMV investors who were not consulted on the move of the licence and had lost control of TV3.

In October, TV3 announced that 60% of its staff would be fired by 1 January as the channel was only attracting 1% of the Czech audience and losing money as a result. Staff to be laid off received their notices on 1 December. A request to expand the TV3 service across the whole of the Czech Republic by using 47 UHF frequencies were all refused by the council.

In November, EMV moved equipment from the Hradec Králové studios to TV3's Prague studios after Kidernay told EMV to suspend broadcasting or face immediate action, alongside a request for a thirty-day break in broadcasting. EMV announced that it still had a right to broadcast and that they would still be broadcasting via pay television, though terrestrial broadcasts went off the air on 7 November 2001. Kindernay lodged a complaint with the council stating that EMV were operating TV3 illegally.

TV3 was temporally closed down for four days on 2 December 2001 under guidance from the Czech Radio and Television Broadcasting Council whilst they decided whether TV3's broadcasts were legal. Text was displayed on screen during the time off-air stating that the close down was due to a decision made on 20 November 2001 by the council and that the station would definitely close by 6 December. The council allowed Kindernay to resume broadcasting as the legal licence holder for TV3 under the control of RTV Galaxie using only material from TV3 on 6 December. The station did resume broadcasting as TV3 Hradec Králové and TV3 Prague.

== Closing down ==
On 18 December 2001, TV3's licence was revoked. The decision behind it was made because TV3 had been showing non-original programming.

In January 2002, TV3 was given a temporary licence by the council for 60 days. At the same time, approval was given for the channel to be renamed as Galaxie Praha and Galaxie Hradec Králové. The two stations remained broadcasting and were sold a year later to GES Holding, the owner of TV Prima who rebranded them as TV Praha and TV Hradec Králové.

TV3 remained broadcasting on the Eutelsat 28A satellite until August 2002, when the station was rebranded as Stanice O (Óčko).

In 2005, the stations investor, EMV issued an arbitration to seek €33.4 million in damages from the Czech Radio and Television Broadcasting Council, because of the changes made back in 2001 to TV3's licence. The arbitration case, being held in London eventually ruled in July 2009 in favour of the Czech Republic in a ruling that cost EMV €77 million.
