= Prime TV Zambia =

Private television station in Lusaka Zambia

Prime TV is a private television station in Lusaka, Zambia, that was founded, and first broadcast on 20 January 2013. Prime TV was critical of government activity in Zambia, which resulted in attempts from the government to close it. On 9 April 2020 it was closed by the Zambian government. Following Hakainde Hichilema elected as President of Zambia, Prime TV was reopened.
