= Senhora Dona Lady =

- Genre: Reality television
- Presented by: Herman José; Sílvia Alberto
- Country of origin: Portugal
- Original language: Portuguese
- No. of seasons: 1

Production
- Executive producer: Frederico Ferreira de Almeida
- Production locations: Paço de Arcos, Lisbon
- Production company: FremantleMedia

Original release
- Network: SIC
- Release: September 16 – September 27, 2005

Senhora Dona Lady was a Portuguese reality television series broadcast by SIC. The series was an adaptation of the US format He's a Lady produced by Evolution Film & Tape for TBS. The series premiered on September 16, 2005, and concluded on September 27, 2005. Filmed at the Valentim de Carvalho studios in Paço de Arcos, the series depicted eleven men in competition for a €50,000 reward over who could, as in the original version, pass themselves off as a more convincing woman. The contestants were required to cross-dress and adopt feminine personas. The Portuguese version was set in a house, similar to formats such as Big Brother, and was presented by Herman José.

Senhora Dona Lady was one out of two LGBT-themed programs SIC premiered that month, the other being Esquadrão G, a local adaptation of Queer Eye for the Straight Guy. Low ratings, coupled by the network changing its director of programming, caused the format to end less than two months after its premiere, which was originally scheduled to last for ten weeks (by contrast the original version had six episodes).

== Format ==
The reality show depicted eleven men in competition for a reward of €50,000. All contestants were subjected to pass themselves off as women, starting their conversion at a prolific hairdresser in Lisbon. The contestants, who adopted feminine personas, were required to move into a dwelling known as "Casa das Bonecas" (corresponding to the original's The Doll House). In an effort to "live as a lady," during the first week alone, the contestants were taught about shaving, make-up and hair styling. A contestant was eliminated from the competition each week at the discretion of a celebrity panel, which included presenter Ana Marques, former footballer Oceano, and fashion producer Ana Guerra.

== Production ==
Senhora Dona Lady was announced on September 6, 2005 and was set to be the key show for the fall season of 2005, akin to what Ídolos was in the two previous fall seasons. Instead of following the weekly pattern of the original version, the series was patterned akin to TVI's format of Big Brother and related shows: there was a weekly eviction gala presented by Herman José and airing on Fridays, as well as daily flashes throughout SIC's schedule presented by Sílvia Alberto. The adaptation to the Portuguese market was made "in order to have a longer effect, more interactivity with the public and more weekly challenges for the contestants to surpass", according to then-director of programs Manuel Fonseca. During its first week, the series had better ratings among females, with 62,7% tuning in.

Jornal de Notícias columnist Dina Margato criticized the program the day following its premiere, claiming it to be "pure entertainment" and criticizing Sílvia Alberto's posture.

On September 26, 2005, Francisco Penim became the channel's new director of programs, and his first measure was to cancel the series, a little over a week after its premiere, and with only one eviction gala (the second gala was to be scheduled for September 30) Journalist Maria Teresa Horta said that the program "monkeyed female stereotypes", considering them as fake, and "reducing the true essence of being a woman". The finale was a fictional ending, in which Casa das Bonecas caught fire. SIC did not announce a replacement program for the timeslots it occupied, and all compromises with sponsors, contestants and its production were solved. The winner was to be announced on October 4.

The winner was Sérgio Torres, who was given the code name Gisele (as in Gisele Bündchen), who received the €50,000 check from the producers at SIC's headquarters in Carnaxide, but, instead of following his initial promise of sharing the prize money, he claimed it all for himself. Another former lady, Nuno Valente, code name Valentina, accused SIC's new director of vetoing the participation of the former contestants, justifying the veto of a Jaimão performance on HermanSIC of his new CD (which was partly recorded at Casa das Bonecas), treating the former contestants as "puppets".

== See also ==
- Cross-dressing in film and television
