= Channel 3 virtual TV stations in Canada =

The following television stations operate on virtual channel 3 in Canada:

- CBHT-DT in Halifax, Nova Scotia
- CBWFT-DT in Winnipeg, Manitoba
- CFRN-DT in Edmonton, Alberta
- CHAU-DT-1 in Sainte-Marguerite-Marie, Quebec
- CHAU-DT-11 in Kedgwick, New Brunswick
- CIMT-DT-8 in Cabano, Quebec
- CKVR-DT in Barrie, Ontario
