= El Watan (TV channel) =

El Watan Al Djazairia الوطن الجزائرية
- Country: Algeria
- Broadcast area: Europe, Africa, Middle-East
- Headquarters: Tunis, Tunisia

Programming
- Language: Arabic
- Picture format: 4:3 (576i, SDTV)

Ownership
- Owner: Hamas

History
- Launched: February 20, 2014
- Closed: 12 October 2015

Links
- Website: elwatanmedia.ma (french)

El Watan Al Djazairia (Arabic: الوطن الجزائرية) was an Arabic language satellite television channel broadcasting from Algeria. El Watan Al Djazairia was set up by Islamist party Hamas with a number of Arab intellectuals from Algeria and the Arab World.

== History ==
El Watan Al Djazairia was founded on 20 February 2014, it has started to broadcast its programs on 20 February 2014. It closed down on 12 October 2015 over a broadcast of an interview of an Islamist fighter. At a demonstration in front of Parliament over the channel's closure, 18 people were arrested and brutalized by police.
