= Channel 3 (Trelew, Argentina) =

LS8TV Canal 3 de Trelew
Chubut; Argentina
- City: Trelew
- Channels: Analog: 3 (VHF)

Ownership
- Owner: Grupo Jornada; Antaxus S.A.

History
- Founded: 25 October 1964

Technical information
- Licensing authority: ENACOM

Links
- Website: www.diariojornada.com.ar/Canal3/

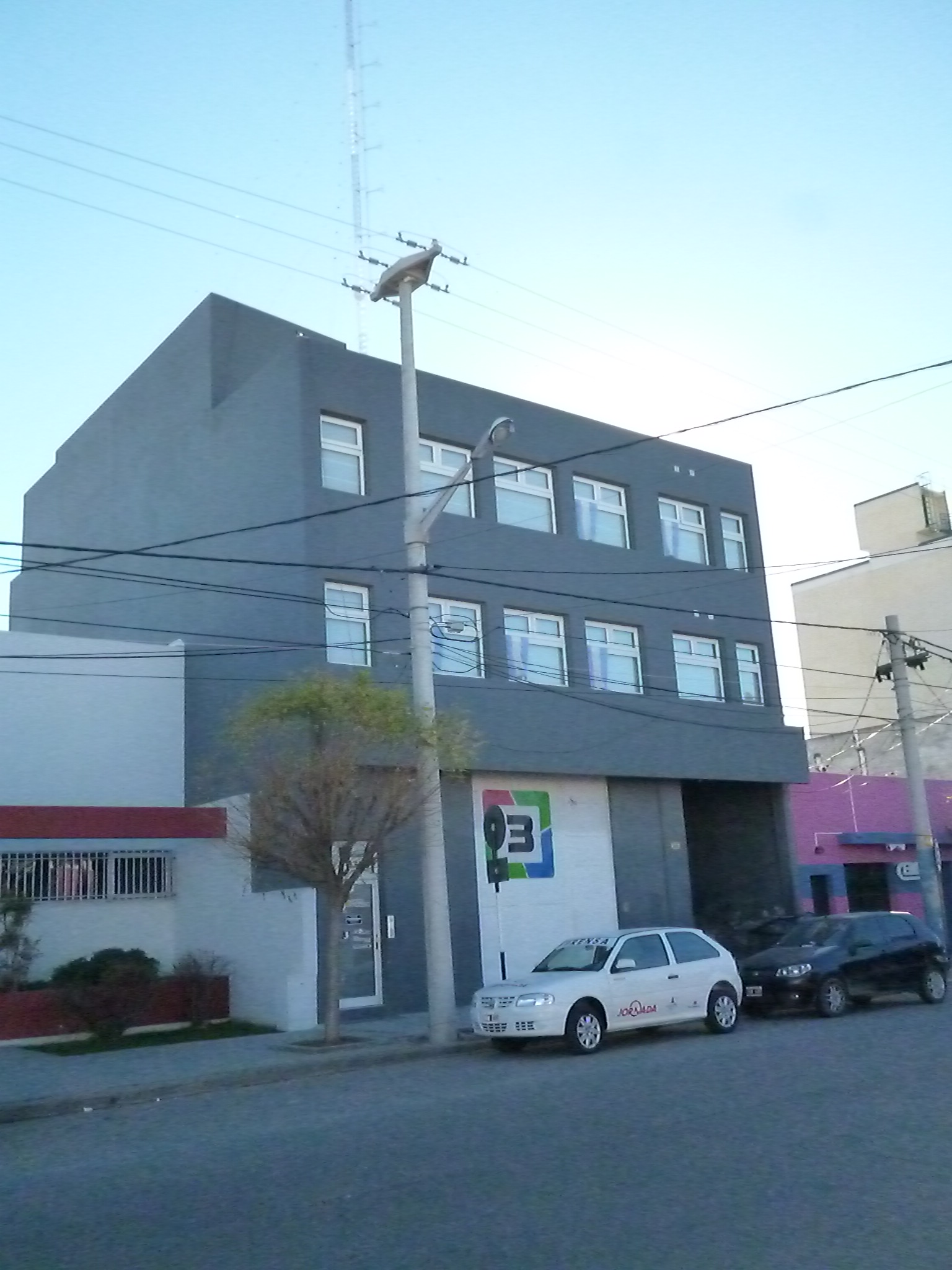

Channel 3 is a private television channel located in the Province of Chubut with headquarters in Trelew and Comodoro Rivadavia. Since 2006, it has been owned by Grupo Jornada (Trelewen media group) and Antaxus S.A. and transmits only its own programming. It has offices in Rawson, Esquel and Puerto Madryn.

It began broadcasting on 25 October 1964, in closed circuit, and its first directors were Pedro Arranz and Jorge Luis Peralta. One of its directors was the former Chubut governor Atilio Oscar Viglione. The channel was also related in its beginnings to Channel 4 of Esquel.

== History ==
The company was set up in 1964 by a group of local businessmen, led by Pedro Arranz. The first test broadcast was held on 10 July that year, at the Trelew Touring Club. Regular broadcasts started a few months later, on 25 October, at 6:30pm, with equipment from Deneb.

On 10 March 2014, the channel increased its local programming to 12 hours on weekdays. The channel's parent company, Antaxus, was denounced in 2016 over a political scandal
