= Télé Futurs Médias =

Télé Futurs Medias
- Country: Senegal

Programming
- Languages: French; Wolof

Ownership
- Owner: Groupe Futurs Médias

History
- Launched: September 1, 2010; 16 years ago

Télé Futurs Médias, abbreviated and branded as TFM, is a Senegalese private television channel owned by Groupe Futurs Médias, in turn owned by Youssou N'Dour. Launched as a cultural channel in 2010, it became a full-on generalist channel in 2011.

== History ==
Youssou N'Dour had repeatedly tried receiving a private television license since 2008, but the Senegalese authorities repeatedly denied his request. An authorization was granted on 10 May 2010 after a meeting took place between N'Dour and president Abdoulaye Wade, who on 1 May had stated that TFM had foreign intervention, citing a problem with the port of Dakar which was owned by the Bolloré group until 2007. The meeting gave N'Dour all of the evidence needed to the regulators that TFM was fully-Senegalese and no foreign investment was obtained for its launch. However, the license plan was amended from being generalist to cultural. This was decided by N'Dour taken into account several interpretations of the events regarding the license and the then-upcoming 2012 presidential elections.

TFM prepared its studios at Almadies during the licensing process. A new investment reached the station in July 2010 in order to have it operational. As of 2011, French newspaper Libération reported that TFM had "promising results".

During Lent 2025, the channel started airing Dogmatique three times a week to spread Christianity and inter-religious dialogue. It was also based on similar Muslim initiative that air during Ramadan. On 11 July 2025, an investigation was made against TFM panelist Ousmane Sonko for "speading misinformation".
