= MYtv =

African TV channel

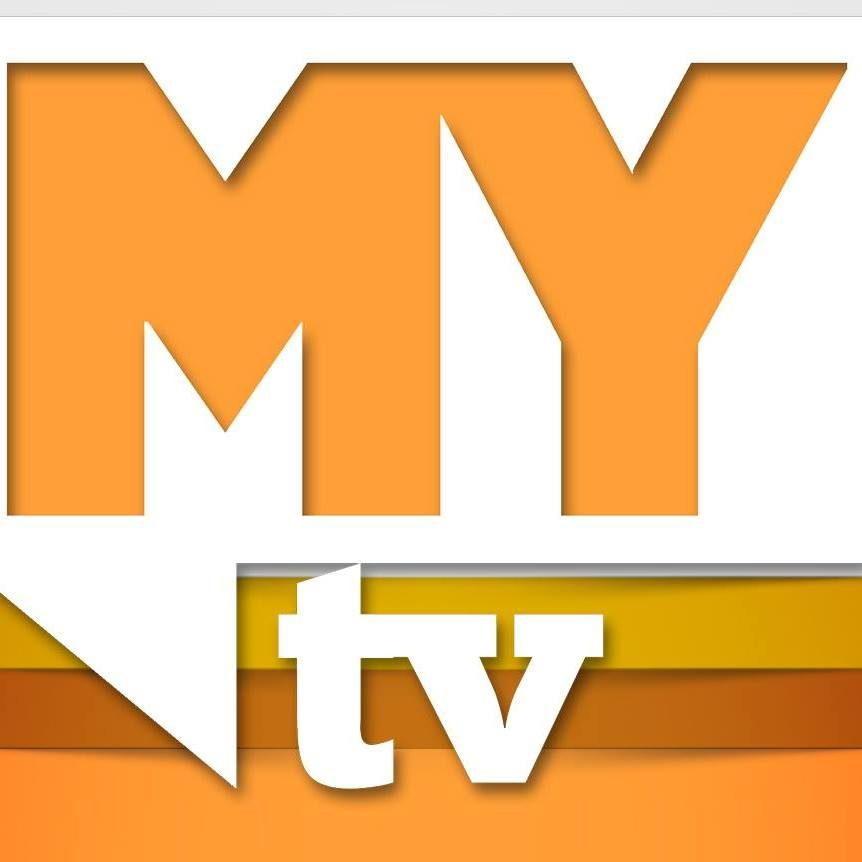
- Country: South Africa
- Broadcast area: Southern Africa

Programming
- Language: Afrikaans
- Picture format: 16:9 (576i, SDTV)

Ownership
- Owner: Privately owned

History
- Launched: February 2009

Links
- Website: www.mytv.co.za

MYtv, formerly ASTV (Afrikaanse Satellietelevisie), is an Afrikaans Television Channel in South Africa which is privately owned.

== History ==
The channel is based in Johannesburg, South Africa, and was first launched on Sentech's Vivid platform in 2009 and then later launched on TopTV (now known as StarSat) in October 2010.

ASTV started broadcasting on OpenViewHD on 15 October 2013. On 15 August 2016, ASTV announced that the channel will no longer be available on OpenViewHD and the channel feed will be cut off on 14 October 2016, but they will still continue broadcasting on StarSat.

On 1 March 2017, ASTV was renamed to MYtv.

== Content ==
MYtv broadcasts documentaries, educational, cooking, lifestyle and Afrikaans music videos content. The company producing the channel also produces TV adverts for advertisers and music videos for artists.

== Sister Channels ==
In September 2017, the channel launched their first sister channel, Onse TV. The new channel has entertainment that caters for the Coloured community.

== See also ==
- List of South African television channels
- Television in South Africa
- TopTV
- kykNET
- StarSat
