= Channel 3 (Formosa, Argentina) =

Canal 3
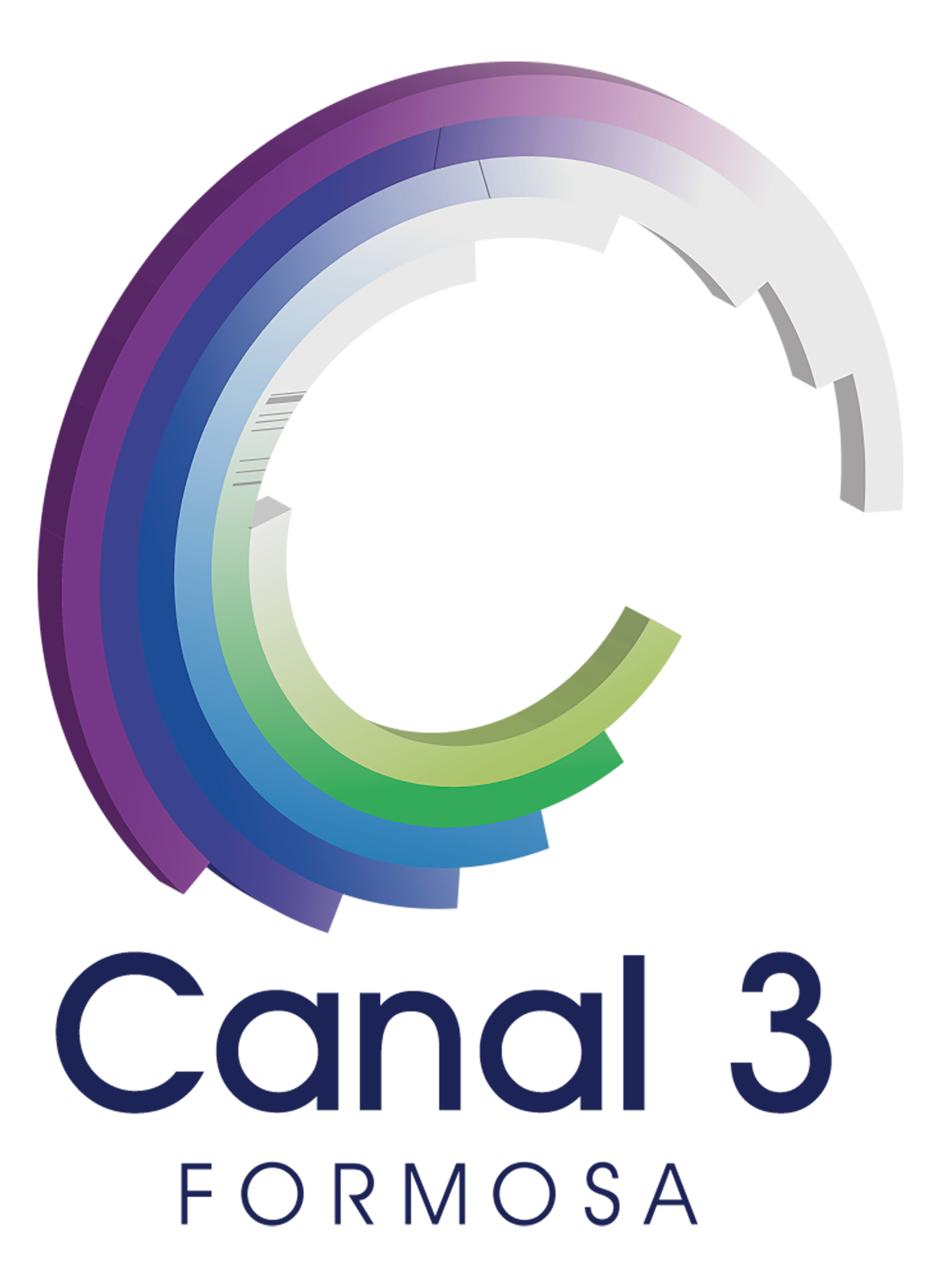
- Formosa; Argentina
- City: Formosa
- Channels: Analog: 3 (VHF)
- Branding: Canal 3 Formosa

Ownership
- Owner: Agenfor (Government of Formosa Province)

History
- First air date: 10 June 1987

Technical information
- Licensing authority: ENACOM

Links
- Website: agenfor.com.ar

Canal 3 Formosa is a television station broadcasting on channel 3 in Formosa, Formosa Province, Argentina, owned by the provincial government.

== History ==
The station started broadcasting on 10 June 1987 alongside sister outlet Radio Tropical; initially, the station was known as Formosa Televisora Color (FTC). FTC had initial technical support from engineer Ramón Rosa Barrionuevo, who had established Channel 11 in 1978 and initially operated from a former government office. Since the beginning, the station was owned by the provincial government, founded under the control of Floro Borgado.

As of 2010, FTC was relaying TV Pública, the national television network, and was in the process of upgrading its technological capabilities, eyeing the Media Law.

By 2014, it, Canal 11 Lapacho and newspaper La Mañana were under the influence of Gildo Insfrán, the governor of the time.

== Technical information ==
As of June 2024, the station still has no satellite link to enable province-wide coverage.
