= 1st TV =

South African TV channel targeting Zimbabwe

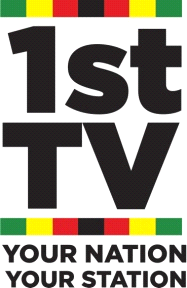
- Country: South Africa
- Broadcast area: Zimbabwe
- Headquarters: Johannesburg, South Africa

History
- Launched: 19 July 2013
- Closed: 27 September 2013

Links
- Website: www.1st-tv.com

1st TV is an independent television station based in South Africa broadcasting to Zimbabwe on free-to-air satellite and on the Internet. The station was launched in the run-up to the 2013 Zimbabwean general election. It was shut down on 27 September 2013 due to financial resources.
