= Sociedade Independente de Comunicação =

Portuguese television network and media company

SIC
- Logo used since 2018
- Country: Portugal
- Broadcast area: Portugal
- Headquarters: Paço de Arcos, Oeiras, Lisbon

Programming
- Language: Portuguese
- Picture format: 1080i HDTV (downscaled to 576i for the SDTV feed)

Ownership
- Owner: Impresa
- Sister channels: SIC Notícias; SIC Radical; SIC Mulher; SIC K SIC Caras; SIC Novelas; SIC Internacional; SIC Internacional África

History
- Launched: 6 October 1992; 34 years ago

Links
- Website: sic.pt

Availability

Terrestrial
- TDT: Channel 3 (SD)

Streaming media
- SIC Online: https://sic.pt/direto

SIC (acronym of full name Sociedade Independente de Comunicação) ("Independent Communication Society") is a Portuguese television network and media company, which runs several television channels. Their flagship channel is the eponymous SIC, the third terrestrial television station in Portugal, launched on 6 October 1992. SIC is owned by Grupo Impresa, a Portuguese media conglomerate. It is one of the two private free-to-air channels in Portugal, among the seven terrestrial free-to-air channels broadcasting from the country. It was the most-watched channel in Portugal from 1995 to 2005, and again from 2019 to today.

== History ==
=== Early plans for a third channel; development of the private TV licenses ===
Plans for a third television channel were enacted as far back as January 1983, where it was initially suggested that the channel would be a cultural and educational service to fill in the gaps in the country's deficient educational system. By April, it was revealed that the channel was scheduled to launch by 1986.

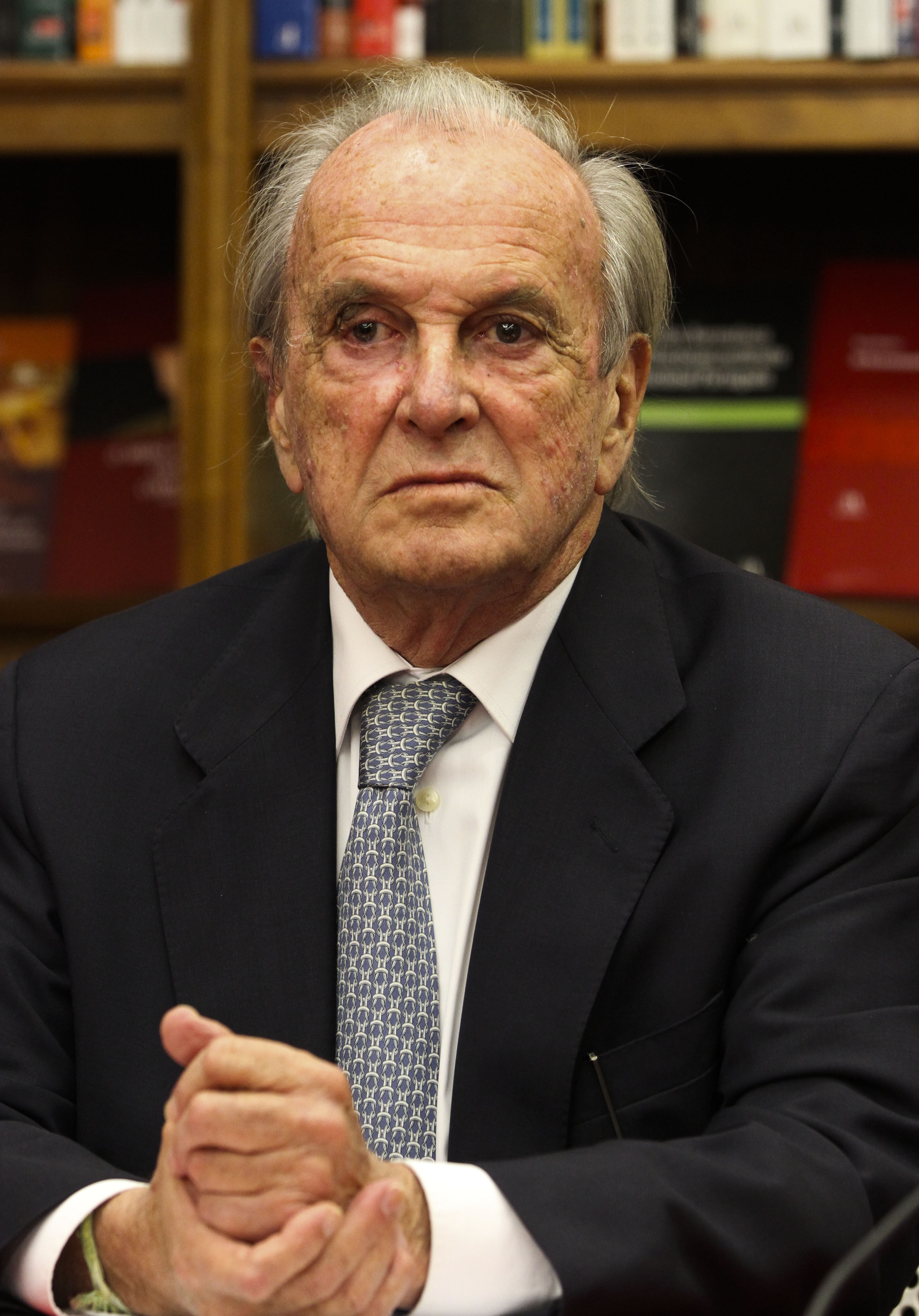
Francisco Pinto Balsemão, SIC's founder

On October 27, 1986, the Portuguese government issued a decree in Diário da República to limit government influence in the media industry, while opening the television sector to the private initiative. Among the companies interested for the license were SOJORNAL (owner of Expresso) among other publishing companies. In the wake of these events, Francisco Pinto Balsemão created SIC, in a consortium of more than ten companies, led by Sojornal, the parent company of Expresso. Balsemão stressed the need for a private channel at a time when the Portuguese cultural identity was facing a crisis, due to the emergence of satellite television, relays of Spanish channels, the ill-fated Europa TV and video stores. By then it alongside the Catholic Church (what would become TVI) were the contenders for the private television licenses. Francisco Pinto Balsemão announced that it would take a period of six to nine months to build the channel, with an initial investment of one million contos. Foreign entities also showed interest, such as Rede Globo and Silvio Berlusconi.

The company was first registered in 1987, with Granada Television initially holding a 20% interest, with the rest being owned by Impala, Expresso and Projornal. Robert Maxwell's BPCC signed an agreement with one of the potential contenders, Emaudio SA, on September 23, 1987. For this end, Canal 3 was created, with João Tito de Morais and Raul Junqueiro as presidents. In the summer of 1988, Emaudio planned to start the channel by November that year. In its experimental phase, in a period of five months, the channel would broadcast for six hours a day. The broadcast of the channel was set to be done from London or Luxembourg. Satellite issues delayed Canal 3's launch to 1989.

The companies that held shares in SIC in 1990 stated that private television would only start in 1992, with SIC intending to start broadcasting in the middle of the year. 25 to 30 percent of the initial schedule would be given to news, while the entertainment programming was given to independent production companies, under the status of "associated producers".

During the three-month period from January 2 to April 2, 1991, Balsemão's SIC was among the contenders for the license. In 1991, the licenses were granted to SIC and TVI. In an initial phase, SIC would devote a substantial amount of its programming to news, "not only political news, but also more general and active news, privileging live", according to Pinto Balsemão. The initial line-up had a prospective starting time of 18:30 on weekdays and 15:30 on weekends, ending every night at midnight. The channel would provider counter-programming to the remaining channels, with a wide variety of content. The months prior to the 1991 Portuguese legislative election led to a delay in the private television process, which meant that the channel would start broadcasting by 1993; unless a decision was made from the media regulator AACS, SIC was confident in starting its broadcasts by May 1992.

The channel initially (until January 2019) broadcast from converted studios in Carnaxide, which belonged to TYE. In 1992, SIC was owned by a consortium led by Francisco Pinto Balsemão, backed by Controljornal, TSF, Rádio Comercial, Lusomundo, Expresso, Impala Editores and Globo. The government granted licenses to SIC and TVI on February 6, 1992, giving a period of one year before starting broadcasts. SIC was initially set to start broadcasting at 17:30 on weekdays and 15:30 on weekends, closing down after midnight. The channel planned four news bulletins and "different, intelligent and popular" entertainment offerings, such as TV series, movies, talk shows and game shows. By March, SIC announced that it would tentatively start broadcasts on October 1. José Eduardo Moniz, who was initially scheduled to be the head of the network's news division, announced that he would continue working on RTP; his post on SIC was filled by Emídio Rangel. In May 1992, it had signed a three-year contract with MTV to carry its content for five hours a week on the upcoming channel. That same month, it confirmed October as its launch month and had spent 4.5 million contos in installation and equipment. Its relationship with Lusomundo, which was part of SIC's launch consortium, was severed. By July, it had secured rights to four matches of the three largest football teams of the Portuguese league. Agreements with CNN, Visnews and WTN were also made, in order to supply news footage for the channel. Ahead of launch and thanks to the football agreement, a rights war between RTP and SIC had started before the latter started its transmissions. SIC was also keen on providing sponsorship agreements for the clubs involved. An agreement with Sporting CP was signed to sponsor the team's shirts. In September, architect Tomás Taveira was appointed for the design of the studios.

=== Test phase, launch and Rangel years ===
The first version of SIC's logo, used until 6 October 1997.

On October 1, 1992 (mere days after starting its signal at least in Lisbon), SIC held its first experimental broadcast. During a five day period, the channel broadcast an international soccer match, a rock concert, two made-for-TV movies and a debate about Maastricht at Associação Comercial de Lisboa. Balsemão justified the schedule by criticizing RTP's practices of dumping imports at later timeslots. The channel employed a staff of 270 employees

Regular transmissions began on October 6, 1992, becoming the first Portuguese private television channel. The channel opened at 16:30 with a news bulletin, followed by the first MTV program, the American series Guys Next Door, the game show Responder à Letra (adapted from Catchphrase), the telenovela Plumas e Paetês, Praça Pública at 19:30, Jornal da Noite at 20:00 followed by the Globo miniseries Tereza Batista; in Noite de Estreia the channel presented its first film, War of the Roses; the schedule ended with The Benny Hill Show and the late news. The channel's initial strategy depended mainly on Canal 1's programming which started minutes later due to the reformulation of lottery draws due to the launch of SIC. As an example, the channel programmed sitcoms at the timeslot where it was scheduled to air on Canal 1, in an attempt to lure viewers. More than one week after launch, it aired the derby between Sporting and Benfica. The first football match broadcast by a private television channel in Portugal had a more complex camera setup than RTP and had not been employed by Portuguese television at the time. A breakthrough agreement was signed with MCA/Universal in late October providing the channel access to series that have never aired on Portuguese television to date, as well as a package of 100 feature films. The channel also aired the Italian "sexy game" Colpo Grosso which was heavily criticized for its topless women. Colpo Grosso was the channel's most popular show in its early months on air. SIC surpassed Canal 1 for the first time in early November, with a match between Sporting and Porto airing at 16:00, the same time as Benfica-Boavista on TV2. In an act of desperation, Canal 1 programmed Who Framed Roger Rabbit at the last minute. The ratings miracle was limited to the match on SIC, with most of the audience moving to Canal 1 after the match ended.

First impressions for the channel's first month turned out to be "satisfying" for Balsemão due to its "high level" programming and ratings that were higher than counterparts in other European countries. To counter Canal 1's premiere of Pedra Sobre Pedra, SIC premiered De Corpo e Alma, prompting Canal 1 to move the premiere two days in advance. By mid-November, its signal had reached the Algarve region and coastal Alentejo, two weeks ahead of schedule. To intensify the war, SIC promised that it would start airing De Corpo e Alma seven minutes before Pedra Sobre Pedra on Canal 1 and would provide call-in competitions with cars and trips to Brazil as prizes. By December it had billings in excess of 1.2 million contos in the first two months on air alone; the signal had already reached 71% of Portuguese households, up from 54% on launch day.

SIC reshuffled its programming in January 1993, weeks ahead of the launch of Quatro. Among the highlights was the Lorimar soap Knots Landing, which had never been aired before in Portugal. Its premiere caused its afternoon programming for children to move to weekends, starting earlier at 12:00. Advertising rates for the channel were also lowered. In order to attract a wider male audience, SIC started airing Playboy Late Night on 5 February 1993, on Friday nights. To counter RTP's rights to air Formula 1, SIC secured the rights to the CART Indy Car Series in March 1993, at a time when Nigel Mansell and Nelson Piquet competed. In May the channel premiered the hidden camera show Minas e Armadilhas, Labirinto, adapted from the Dutch format Labyrinth and the return of Roque Santeiro to Portuguese television. It also aired highlights of the 1993 Giro d'Italia. In June, it had swapped the airtimes of Globo's Renascer and Jornal da Noite due to the Brazilian series' unsatisfactory results.

SIC celebrated its first anniversary with new programs, Chuva de Estrelas (adaptation of Soundmixshow) with Catarina Furtado, E o Resto é Conversa, the first daytime talk show on a private channel, with Teresa Guilherme, Conversas Curtas with Carneiro Jacinto, comedy series Ora Bolas Marina with actress Marina Mota, new episodes of The Raven and the premieres of Melrose Place, Highlander: The Series and Love & War. The channel's share was now averaging 15%, thanks to the increase of national productions. Melrose Place aired in its Brazilian Portuguese dub, at the same time as TVI started airing The A-Team in the same format. The airing of dubbed versions raised concerns from the Portuguese Association for Deaf People. For the Christmas season of 1993, SIC started broadcasting at 11:00 on weekdays. On December 22 it screened the Timewatch documentary about Mao Zedong (Chairman Mao: The Last Emperor), which was followed by a debate. The airing of the documentary was met with criticism from the Chinese Embassy in Lisbon, alleging it would hurt bilateral relations.

In late January 1994, SIC started broadcasting at 12:00 on weekdays, airing repeats in the first hour. The MTV programs moved to the noon slot, after almost a year airing before closedown. Jornal da Noite reverted to the 8pm timeslot. On weekends, the channel premiered Home Improvement. Later, in February, with the premiere of O Mapa da Mina, the MTV programs disappeared. On 14 March, the channel premiered O Juiz Decide, the first court case program on Portuguese television. The trials were initially recorded, aiming to make them live at a later stage. On April 30, it premiered Caça ao Tesouro, which was hosted by Catarina Furtado, who did the same for Chuva de Estrelas. By then, more programs reached the weekly top tens, including the primetime Globo telenovela, Ora Bolas Marina and Perdoa-me.

June 1994 saw a breakthrough deal with Rede Globo to gain exclusive rights to its telenovelas for a period of five years. On September 19, the channel premiered Insónias, a late night current slot for current affairs programming, and the new Globo series A Viagem. It also broadcast the 1994 Emmy Awards. The strand consisted of five programs, Tostões and Milhões (which had existed before, economics); A Noite da Má Língua, Internacional SIC (international in-depth reports); Flashback (TV version of the TSF format of the same name, a political view of the past week), and O Senhor que se Segue. For the second anniversary on October 6, the channel had a 24-hour programming marathon with feature films, music specials and the centerpiece, As Nossas Estrelas, a version of Chuva de Estrelas with the channel's presenters. By this time, there were serious chances for the channel to overtake Canal 1, but was weak in rights to football and production of game shows. Teresa Guilherme presented the new game show Destino X, which was filmed in locations around the world. Ahead of Christmas, the channel premiered Pátria Minha, retitled as Vidas Cruzadas.

January 1995 saw the premiere of Walker, Texas Ranger. The channel had doubled its viewing figures in 1994 alone alongside those of TVI; the channel was on track to surpass Canal 1 that year. On New Year's Day, several programs brought SIC to a leading position, with the record-breaker being Indiana Jones and the Last Crusade, as well as Bravo Bravissimo and A Viagem. An agreement in February brought the exclusive rights to the documentary series People's Century, co-produced by the BBC and WGBH. New programs by spring such as Globo's Irmãos Coragem and the local formats Assuntos de Família and Máquina da Verdade bought in high viewing figures. In April 1995, Jornal da Noite moved its weekend starting time to 21:00. The following month, it aired its first Venezuelan telenovela, Por amarte tanto. The positive results of the channel caused projections in June to suggest that, out of the four terrestrial channels, only SIC would bring in profits in 1995. In July, Irmãos Coragem was replaced by A Próxima Vítima. The channel also controversially broadcast two programs from the Universal Church of the Kingdom of God's Portuguese division outside regular broadcast hours; the sect was being investigated at the time.

In 1996, Joe Berardo became the largest individual shareholder of the channel, holding 19% of the shares. In early 1997, the channel claimed an audience share of 50%. In March, SIC shot scenes in the Super Buéréré studio for the upcoming anniversary of Queen Beatrix of the Netherlands. At the time, it was recurrent for the program to talk about foreign cultures.

The channel celebrated its fifth anniversary with an uninterrupted marathon of programming between October 3 and the early hours of October 7, with a special gala scheduled for October 6. To fill in the overnight schedules, the channel aired themed movie nights. After the celebrations, SIC reprogrammed People's Century with additional commentary from former president Mário Soares.

In its initial years, it acquired a large audience, eventually overtaking RTP1 by 1995. SIC became widely known across Europe for achieving high viewing figures just two to three years after launching, as well as being the subject of an Arte documentary known as Cette Télévision est la Vôtre (This Television is Yours), directed by Mariana Otero.

In January 1999, the channel announced the premiere of SIC 11 Horas in February, ending the daytime monopoly held by Praça da Alegria, as well as the return of Praça Pública. In January 2000, it introduced the DOT mileage system. Endemol tried to sell the Big Brother format to the channel, but the directive rejected it, forcing it to go to TVI instead.

On March 19, 2001, the channel premiered its first national telenovela, Ganância (Greed), produced by NBP company Multicena. Although it had the participation of a handful of Brazilian actors (the telenovelas SIC used to up its ratings were all from Globo until then) and shared its timeslot during primetime with Porto dos Milagres, its ratings didn't increase in tandem (having lost to TVI on premiere night) and was "demoted" to the afternoon, prompting changes to the characters' traits. On 20 August, it acquired airing The Jerry Springer Show, a controversial American daytime talk show, which SIC gave the nickname O Grande Deastre Americano (The Great American Disaster), which, according to the distributor, was leading rating rankings in thirty out of the fifty countries where it was airing.

=== Manuel Fonseca administration ===
Emídio Rangel quit SIC in August 2001, moving to RTP in the process, as the channel was starting to face a fall in ratings due to the rise of TVI, as well as the fall in Impresa's stocks. In September, the post of director of programming was occupied by Manuel Fonseca.

Globo, in order to solve its debt issues in 2002, proceeded to sell the 15% of its shares on SIC. Around that time, SIC was facing a crisis and had to cut €5 million from its budget for 2003. The channel's finances fell €90.29 million in the first nine months of 2002 alone. On 6 November, SIC's staff made a plenary session regarding the financial situation of the channel, and announced that they would convene again on 20 November.

SIC in this period was in charge of several entries for the Guinness Book of Records, among them the longest period subject to hypnotism (75 hours), the longest dance (101 hours) and the longest kiss, with SIC stretching for 75 hours (the previous record held by an Israeli couple in 1999 was of 31 hours).

In September 2005, SIC premiered two reality shows: Esquadrão G: Não És Homem Não És Nada (adapted from Queer Eye for the Straight Guy) on September 11, followed by Senhora Dona Lady (adapted from He's a Lady) on September 16. The latter, initially set to last ten weeks, came to a halt after only two weeks when Francisco Penim became the new director, under the grounds that the reality show, touted as SIC's biggest show for the season, "served nobody".

=== Francisco Penim administration ===
In 2005, TVI, after recovering from a financial crisis, overtook SIC in the ratings. In September that year, Manuel Fonseca left the post of director of programming after the failures of Esquadrão G and Senhora Dona Lady. His replacement was Francisco Penim, who was previously in charge of the cable channels. In the first semester of 2005 alone, SIC was behind TVI. Aside from RTP1 taking over second place in 2007, 2009 and 2010, for the next fourteen years, SIC would be in second place until overtaking TVI in 2019.

On November 30, 2005, the channel gained exclusive rights to the FIFA World Cup, marking the first time the competition aired exclusively on private television. In order to counter TVI's Morangos com Açúcar, the channel started working on an adaptation of Floricienta (eventually named Floribella) in early 2006.

SIC tried introducing a morning news program on March 6, 2006, Programa da Manhã, replacing its morning block of cartoons. The aim was to compete with established market leader Bom Dia Portugal, which it aimed to surpass within its first months. Instead of limiting itself to constant repetition of the news like its competitor, it also included health and lifestyle segments. With its premiere, SIC now had nine hours of live programming on weekdays. During its first month, it did not score well in ratings, ending up in fourth place, behind RTP2.

Overall, the 2005-2006 period was known for having a string of failures. On the days when Programa da Manhã recorded its highs (April 6, June 6 and June 13), it did not surpass 66,000 viewers and was easily beaten by its competitors. The new afternoon talk-show Contacto only surpassed 25% share three times by late June 2006. Carlos Moura's Boca a Boca only had eight editions. The new direction "inherited" the decision of cancelling new programs based on the cancellation of Senhora Dona Lady under Manuel Fonseca. Pegar ou Largar, the Portuguese Deal or No Deal and O Pior Condutor de Sempre also reported lows.

=== Nuno Santos administration ===
Penim left SIC in January 2008 after resigning from his post by mutual agreement. He was replaced by Nuno Santos. The previous administration put its ratings in third place, behind RTP1. Nuno Santos left SIC in August 2011, moving to RTP's news division.

=== Successive administrations from 2011 to 2018 ===
In 2011, Impresa opened SIC's new Porto studios in Matosinhos, on the site of a former slaughterhouse. The studios also holds the newsrooms of Expresso, Visão, the Caras magazine, the web portal AEIOU.pt and Infoportugal. In 2019, SIC, along with its parent company Impresa, relocated from its studios in Carnaxide to a new building in Paço de Arcos.

Francisco Pinto Balsemão left SIC's supervision post in January 2017; from March 6, there were two directors of programming, Gabriela Sobral and Luís Proença. SIC renewed the rights to air the UEFA Europa League for the fourth consecutive cycle (2018-2024) for the annual price of €1.6 million. In February 2018, it gained the rights to broadcast eight matches of the 2018 FIFA World Cup.

=== Daniel Oliveira administration; overtaking TVI; losing its leadership ===
Daniel Oliveira became the current director of programming on June 28, 2018, aiming at being competitive on all time slots. During the early months of his administration, longtime TVI star Cristina Ferreira joined SIC after not renewing her contract with the competing channel.

SIC left the Carnaxide building on January 27, 2019, the last program produced from there being that day's edition of Primeiro Jornal. Symbolically, the last images seen from the old facilities featured journalist João Moleira walking through the facilities and taking the SIC license (dated October 2, 1992) away from it, which he was taking to the new headquarters.

On June 21, 2020, SIC announced the premiere of Domingão, the first pimba program the channel aired on Sunday afternoons since the cancellation of Portugal em Festa four years earlier. Created to support pimba artists in the wake of the pandemic, the program replaced the regular Sunday afternoon movie slot. SIC has not returned to regular Sunday afternoon movies since and has been criticized in 2021 by Vicente Alves do Ó for being an "unending hell", refusing to support artists of other genres.

On January 2, 2022, all of Impresa's websites, including SIC's, were hit by a ransomware attack attributed to the LAPSUS$ group,.

SIC lost its ratings to TVI for the first time in five years in February 2024. In return, the channel sent a plane to TVI's facilities with the phrase "Thank you for giving us (the) fight". In July it became the first over-the-air channel to air a Turkish series, after the success of such productions on its cable channels, with a dubbed version of Kızım that had previously aired on SIC K. SIC Mulher aired the subtitled version. It was then followed by Çocuk, here titled Pobre Menino Rico. In April 2025 to today, win its ratings again to TVI.

== Identity ==
The logo was designed in 1992 by Hans Donner, creator of the iconic TV Globo logo, following a philosophy of color, movement and the idea of unity. The logo represents a rainbow, from yellow to dark blue, with warmer colors dominating. In the center, a lowercase i (for independente) showing its position of differentiation to RTP. The ring that forms a trail between the letters S and C represents a crowd united in the visual aesthetic, with strong emotional dimensions, as created by the Rome Colosseum. At start-up and closedown, the station aired a two-minute video, featuring some of Donner's works for Globo between 1980 and 1992, accompanied by the channel's anthem. The lyrics for the channel anthem was composed by Zé da Ponte, with lyrics written by Carlos Paulo Simões and sung by Nucha, Dulce Pontes, Tó Leal and Gustavo Sequeira. It was re-recorded for its 25th anniversary campaign, with new singers.

At the beginning of its 25th anniversary in April 2017, SIC introduced a mascot, whose name (PLIM, MIC of SIX) was chosen based on an online survey. The corporate anthem was re-recorded for the occasion.

SIC updated its logo on October 6, 2018, for the first time in 26 years, its lettering changed.

== Programming ==
Nowadays, SIC has a programming largely based on talk shows (live and recorded), Portuguese and Turkish soap operas, and to a lesser extent Brazilian soaps produced by Globo.

Like the other major broadcaster, TVI, SIC used to air international TV series such as Criminal Minds, the various CSI series and Entourage always after 1 a.m.

In-house productions in the past included occasional reality shows and comedy sketch shows, which included Malucos do Riso (1995-2009), a long-running series with focus on dramatized jokes, and Gato Fedorento (Zé Carlos series and Esmiúça os Sufrágios special only).

=== Shows ===
- Casa Feliz (Happy House, since 2020)
- O Programa da Cristina (2019-2020)
- Júlia (since 2018)
- E-Especial (since 2008)
- Fama Show (Fame Show) (since 2008)
- Alta Definição (interviews, since 2009)

=== Family entertainment ===
- Peso Pesado (The Biggest Loser) (2011-2012; 2015)
- Factor X (X Factor) (2013-2015)
- Ídolos (Idol)
- Ponto de Encontro (1995-2002)
- Cantor ou Impostor? (I Can See Your Voice)

=== Soap operas ===
- Laços de Sangue (Blood Ties) (2010-2011)
- Rosa Fogo (Fire of Rose) (2011-2012)
- Dancin' Days (Dancin' Days) (2012-2013)
- Poderosas (Powerful)
- Coração d'Ouro (Golden Heart)
- Rainha das Flores (Queen of Flowers)
- Papel Principal (2023-2024)

=== Sports ===
- UEFA Europa League (2009-2024)
- Red Bull Air Race World Championship

=== TV series ===
SIC no longer airs foreign series. This is a partial list.

- CSI: Crime Scene Investigation (CSI: Las Vegas)
- CSI: Miami
- CSI: NY (CSI: Nova Iorque)
- Criminal Minds (Mentes Criminosas)
- Downton Abbey (2012)
- NCIS (Investigação Criminal)
- NCIS: Los Angeles (Investigação Criminal Los Angeles)
- In Treatment
- The Walking Dead (Os Mortos Vivos) (2011, season 1 only)
- Los Protegidos (Os Protegidos)
- CSI: Cyber
- Blacklist
- Agents of S.H.I.E.L.D.

=== News ===
- Edição da Manhã (Morning Edition) (simulcast on SIC Notícias)
- Primeiro Jornal (1:00 pm News)
- Jornal da Noite (Evening News)

=== Kids ===
In 2006, the channel started to broadcast the block "SIC Kids", broadcasting a few hours later the block "Disney Kids" (which only featured Disney programming), until its cancellation in 2015.

As of 2025, SIC stopped airing foreign cartoons. This is a partial list.

- Oggy and the Cockroaches (Oggy e as Baratas)
- Teenage Mutant Ninja Turtles
- W.I.T.C.H.
- Dexter's Laboratory
- Gravion
- Looney Tunes
- The Magic School Bus
- Action Man
- Bratz
- Pokémon
- Digimon (aired only 4 seasons)
- Sailor Moon
- Dragon Ball
- Dragon Ball Z
- Dragon Ball GT
- Dragon Ball Super
- Super Pig
- YAT Anshin! Luxury Space Tours
- Flint the Time Detective
- Sigma 6
- Shin-Chan (Vitello and Phuuz dubs)
- Mirmo
- Yu-Gi-Oh!
- Monster Rancher
- Mon Colle Knights
- Shinzo
- MegaMan NT Warrior
- Ōban Star-Racers
- Pucca
- Monster Warriors
- Naruto - SIC and SIC K
- Yin Yang Yo!
- Inspector Gadget - SIC and SIC K
- Ben 10 - SIC and SIC K
- Ben 10: Alien Force - SIC and SIC K
- Gormiti - SIC K
- Iron Man: Armored Adventures - SIC K
- Mr. Bean (animated TV series) - SIC K
- Angel's Friends - SIC K
- Madison Online - SIC K
- Bleach - SIC K
- Yu-Gi-Oh! GX - SIC K
- Horseland - SIC K
- Zorro: Generation Z - SIC K
- Legend Of The Dragon - SIC K
- Michaela's Wild Challenge - SIC K
- I.N.K Invisible Network Kids - SIC K
- Puppy in My Pocket - SIC and SIC K
- Power Rangers (1994–present)
- Violetta (only season 1, 2015–2016)
- The Ren & Stimpy Show
- Rugrats
- SpongeBob SquarePants (only aired seasons 1–2)
- ChalkZone (only aired seasons 1–3)

==== As part of Disney Kids ====
- Recess
- Mickey Mouse Works
- House of Mouse
- Kim Possible
- Lilo and Stitch
- Brandy & Mr. Whiskers
- Timon & Pumbaa
- The Emperor's New School
- The Replacements
- Phineas and Ferb
- Teamo Supremo
- Fish Hooks
- DuckTales
- Ultimate Spider-Man
- The Suite Life on Deck
- The Wizards of Waverly Place
- Sonny with a Chance
- Shake It Up
- Jessie
- Doug

=== Live shows ===
- Globos de Ouro (Golden Globes)
- Parabéns, SIC ("Happy Birthday, SIC", literally "Congratulations"—airs when it's SIC's birthday)

=== Movies ===
==== Exclusive broadcasting rights ====
- Walt Disney Pictures/Touchstone Pictures
- Metro-Goldwyn-Mayer/United Artists
- Lions Gate Entertainment/Summit Entertainment

==== Co-shared broadcasting rights ====
- Warner Bros./New Line Cinema (rights co-shared with RTP)
- Columbia Pictures/TriStar Pictures (rights co-shared with RTP)
- 20th Century Fox/Regency Enterprises (rights co-shared with RTP and TVI)
- Universal Studios/Focus Features (rights co-shared with RTP and TVI)
- Paramount Pictures/DreamWorks Pictures (rights co-shared with TVI)

== Audience share ==
1992	1993	1994	1995	1996	1997	1998	1999	2000	2001
8,5%	14,3%	28,4%	41,4%	48,6%	49,3%	49,2%	48,1%	42,2%	34,0%

2002	2003	2004	2005	2006	2007	2008	2009	2010	2011
31,5%	30,3%	29,3%	27,2%	26,2%	25,1%	24,9%	23,4%	23,4%	22,7%

2012	2013	2014	2015	2016	2017	2018	2019	2020	2021
21,8%	21,1%	19,1%	18,7%	17,6%	17,1%	18,6%	19,2%	19,8%	19,3%

2022	2023	2024
16,7%	14,9%	14,9%

== Services ==
=== Teletexto SIC ===
SIC activated its teletext service on January 20, 2003. It provided news, traffic information and a "streamer" for PSI-30 (now PSI-20) indexes. Currently only the subtitles are operational on page 888.

The first telenovela to have its subtitles activated was Mulheres Apaixonadas in September 2003, the year of the launch of the teletext service. This coincided with the implementation of content made more accessible for deaf people, as part of a three-way protocol signed in the previous month. Brazilian lexical terms and expressions are often "localized" in the subtitles, meaning that they don't match the spoken dialogue.

=== SIC Esperança ===
SIC Esperança (literally SIC Hope) it the channel's charity, founded on October 6, 2003. Its twentieth anniversary in 2023 was marked by a new campaign to upgrade primary schools.

=== SIC Online ===
SIC launched its website on May 23, 2001, with a launch team of 37, 18 of which journalists. Instead of being "television on the internet", the website aimed at complementing both the existing SIC and SIC Notícias teams. It was planned since November 1998, but its launch was successively delayed over two and a half years since the project was "too ambitious" when it was first conceived.
