= Bonferey =

- Country: Niger
- Headquarters: Niamey

Programming
- Picture format: SDTV

History
- Launched: 8 February 2008

Links
- Website: Bonferey on Facebook

Bonferey is a private television channel in Niger, based in Niamey, founded on 8 February 2008. The channel shows news and politics of the world.

== Programs ==
- Le Journale
- TV Bonferey Edition Speciale
- Presse +
- Gasar du Tamako
- 5 Dernieres Minutes
- Debat Gaskya
