= Channel 3 digital TV stations in the United States =

The following television stations broadcast on digital channel 3 in the United States:

Call Sign	Virtual Channel Number	City	State	Notes
K03AY-D	10	Ridgway, etc.	Colorado	
K03CM-D	3	Pioche	Nevada	Rebroadcasts KSNV
K03CS-D	12	Broadus	Montana	Rebroadcasts KSGW-TV
K03DJ-D	4	Polson	Montana	Rebroadcasts KXLY-TV
K03DP-D	8	Scobey	Montana	Rebroadcasts KUMV-TV
K03DS-D	8	Ruth	Nevada	Rebroadcasts KLAS-TV
K03DT-D	13	Superior	Montana	Rebroadcasts KECI-TV
K03ET-D	6	Terrace Lakes	Idaho	Rebroadcasts KIVI-TV
K03EY-D	2	Parlin	Colorado	
K03FB-D	8	Snowflake, etc.	Arizona	Rebroadcasts KAET
K03FW-D	13	Kenai, etc.	Alaska	Rebroadcasts KYUR
K03GA-D	3	Elim	Alaska	Rebroadcasts K03GL
K03GL-D	3	King Mountain, etc	Alaska	
K03HD-D	5	Plevna	Montana	Rebroadcasts KXGN-TV
K03HX-D	9	Etna	California	Rebroadcasts KIXE-TV
K03IA-D	8	Sula	Montana	Rebroadcasts KPAX-TV
K03II-D	3	Manhattan	Kansas	
K03IJ-D	16	College Station	Texas	
K03IL-D	8	Bullhead City	Arizona	Rebroadcasts KAET
K03IM-D	3	Eugene	Oregon	
K03IN-D	6	Leavenworth	Washington	Rebroadcasts KHQ-TV
K03IW-D	5	Cedar Canyon	Utah	Rebroadcasts KSL-TV
K03IY-D	19	Denver	Colorado	
K03JB-D	51	Temecula	California	Rebroadcasts KUSI-TV
K03JD-D	3	Salt Lake City	Utah	
K03JE-D	3	Victoria	Texas	
KCNL-LD	3	Reno	Nevada	
KCSO-LD	33	Sacramento	California	
KDLO-TV	3	Florence	South Dakota	
KIEM-TV	3	Eureka	California	
KLAO-LD	8	Corpus Christi	Texas	
KODF-LD	26	Dallas	Texas	
KSGA-LD	3	Los Angeles	California	
KURK-LD	3	San Francisco	California	Rebroadcasts KKPM-CD
KVHD-LD	26	Los Angeles	California	Uses KSGA-LD's spectrum.
KXVU-LD	17	Chico	California	
KYUS-TV	3	Miles City	Montana	
KZHO-LD	38	Houston	Texas	
W03AK-D	4	Ela, etc.	North Carolina	Rebroadcasts WYFF
W03AM-D	10	Harrison	Maine	Rebroadcasts WCBB
W03BU-D	43	Miami	Florida	
W03BW-D	3	Midland City	Alabama	
W03BX-D	3	Sutton	West Virginia	
W03CA-D	3	Tallahassee	Florida	
WBRA-TV	15	Roanoke	Virginia	
WCBI-LD	3	Starkville	Mississippi	
WDVZ-CD	3	Tuscaloosa	Alabama	
WGGN-TV	52	Sandusky	Ohio	
WHNE-LD	3	Detroit	Michigan	
WJLP	33	Middletown Township	New Jersey	
WNWT-LD	37	New York	New York	Uses WJLP's spectrum
WOME-LD	11	Orlando	Florida	
WRZH-LP	30	Red Lion-Harrisburg	Pennsylvania	
WSBS-TV	22	Key West	Florida	
WTHC-LD	42	Atlanta	Georgia	
WWWB-LD	3	Clarkrange	Tennessee	
WZNA-LD	3	Guaynabo	Puerto Rico	

The following stations, which are no longer licensed, formerly broadcast on digital channel 3:

Call Sign	Virtual Channel Number	City	State	Notes
K03DI-D	3	Chelan Butte	Washington	
K03FM-D	3	Haines	Alaska	
K03GP-D	3	Sheldon Point	Alaska	
K03HY-D		San Francisco	California	
K03IR-D	3	Bakersfield	California	
K03IS-D	31	Sioux City	Iowa	
K03IU-D	3	San Bernardino	California	
K03IZ-D	3	Salinas	California	
KHPK-LD		De Soto	Texas	
KVTU-LD		Agoura Hills	California	
WSBS-CD		Miami, etc.	Florida	
WYCN-LD		Boston	Massachusetts	
