= RTS 2 (Senegalese TV channel) =

- Country: Senegal

Programming
- Language: French

Ownership
- Owner: Radiodiffusion Télévision Sénégalaise
- Sister channels: RTS 1 RTS 3 RTS 4 RTS 5

History
- Launched: 2008; 18 years ago
- Former names: SN2 (2008-2014)

Links
- Website: www.rts.sn

RTS 2 (known as SN2 until 2014) is a Senegalese terrestrial television channel owned by Radiodiffusion Télévision Sénégalaise. The channel's format consists of entertainment and sports.

== History ==
RTS previously had a second channel planned in 2001, tentatively named RTS 2, whose abstract concept was created by then-new corporation president Matar Silla. The channel later launched in its experimental phase in 2003 as RTS2S, but parted ways with RTS in 2005, becoming the current 2sTV.

Its second attempt at a second channel, SN2, started broadcasting in 2008. The channel carried matches of the 2010 FIFA World Cup, even though these were not stipulated in the contract signed for the Senegalese broadcast.

On 7 October 2010, RTS signed a new contract with TV5MONDE to relay its African feed on its frequencies on weekdays from 12am to 12pm and on weekends from 2am to 12pm, from 15 October. The goal was for the French channel to "reconquer" the Senegalese market.

The channel initially had its coverage reduced to a 70-kilometer radius in the cities of Dakar and Thiès, for a potential reach of five million viewers. RTS had planned to increase SN2's coverage to all ten regions of the country during 2011.

SN2 was not used to provide results of the 2012 Senegalese parliamentary election, as both RTS channels were simulcasting the UEFA Euro 2012 final between Spain and Italy.

Still in 2012, SN2 began digital terrestrial broadcasts. When full-time digital terrestrial broadcasts started on 17 June 2015, the channel was renamed RTS 2. The full launch of the channel enabled it to have an identity of its own, detaching it from RTS 1 and targeting demographics less covered by the main channel. This made the channel "more open", while still "less religious and less political". The 1pm and 8pm news bulletins from RTS 1 were still relayed.

Diatou Cissé was appointed director of RTS 2, as well as the three regional channels, on 27 March 2019.

On the eve of the start of the 2022 FIFA World Cup, it started HD broadcasts on Canal+ Sénégal.
