= Channel 3 TV stations in Canada =

The following television stations broadcast on digital or analog channel 3 in Canada:

- CFTK-TV in Terrace, British Columbia
- CHAU-DT-1 in Sainte-Marguerite-Marie, Quebec
- CITO-TV in Timmins, Ontario
- CJCB-TV-6 in Port Hawkesbury, Nova Scotia
- CKLT-TV-1 in Florenceville, New Brunswick

== Defunct ==
- CFCN-TV-10 in Fernie, British Columbia
- CFQC-TV-1 in Stranraer, Saskatchewan
- CFRN-TV-2 in Peace River, Alberta
- CHAN-TV-2 in Bowen Island, British Columbia
- CHBC-TV-6 in Celista, British Columbia
- CICI-TV-1 in Elliot Lake, Ontario
- CISA-TV-1 in Burmis, Alberta
- CISA-TV-2 in Brooks, Alberta
- CITM-TV in 100 Mile House, British Columbia
- CKKM-TV in Oliver/Osoyoos, British Columbia
- CKRN-TV-3 in Béarn/Fabre, Quebec
- CKTN-TV-3 in Nelson, British Columbia
