= Channel 3 low-power TV stations in the United States =

The following low-power television stations broadcast on digital or analog channel 3 in the United States:

- K03AY-D in Ridgway, etc., Colorado
- K03CM-D in Pioche, Nevada
- K03CS-D in Broadus, Montana
- K03DJ-D in Polson, Montana
- K03DP-D in Scobey, Montana
- K03DS-D in Ruth, Nevada
- K03DT-D in Superior, Montana
- K03ET-D in Terrace Lakes, Idaho
- K03EY-D in Parlin, Colorado
- K03FB-D in Snowflake, etc., Arizona
- K03FW-D in Kenai, etc., Alaska
- K03GA-D in Elim, Alaska
- K03GL-D in King Mountain, etc., Alaska
- K03HD-D in Plevna, Montana
- K03HX-D in Etna, California
- K03IA-D in Sula, Montana
- K03II-D in Manhattan, Kansas
- K03IJ-D in College Station, Texas
- K03IL-D in Bullhead City, Arizona
- K03IM-D in Eugene, Oregon
- K03IN-D in Leavenworth, Washington
- K03IW-D in Cedar Canyon, Utah
- K03IY-D in Denver, Colorado
- K03JB-D in Temecula, California
- K03JD-D in Salt Lake City, Utah
- K03JE-D in Victoria, Texas
- KCNL-LD in Reno, Nevada
- KCSO-LD in Sacramento, California
- KLAO-LD in Corpus Christi, Texas
- KODF-LD in Dallas, Texas
- KSGA-LD in Los Angeles, California
- KURK-LD in Santa Rosa, California/San Francisco, California
- KVHD-LD in Los Angeles, California, uses KSGA-LD's spectrum
- KXVU-LD in Chico, California
- KZHO-LD in Houston, Texas
- W03AK-D in Ela, etc., North Carolina
- W03AM-D in Harrison, Maine
- W03BU-D in Matecumbe, Florida
- W03BW-D in Midland City, Alabama
- W03BX-D in Sutton, West Virginia
- W03CA-D in Tallahassee, Florida
- WCBI-LD in Starkville, Mississippi
- WDVZ-CD in Tuscaloosa, Alabama
- WHNE-LD in Detroit, Michigan
- WNWT-LD in New York, New York, uses WJLP's full-power spectrum
- WOME-LD in Orlando, Florida
- WRZH-LP in Red Lion-Harrisburg, Pennsylvania
- WTHC-LD in Atlanta, Georgia
- WWWB-LD in Clarkrange, Tennessee
- WZNA-LD in Guaynabo, Puerto Rico

The following low-power stations, which are no longer licensed, formerly broadcast on analog or digital channel 3:

- K03AL in Toquerville, Utah
- K03AO in Manitou Springs, Colorado
- K03AS in Richfield, etc., Utah
- K03BF in Enterprise, Utah
- K03CN in Duchesne, Utah
- K03CR in Big Laramie, etc., Wyoming
- K03CT in Lewiston, etc., California
- K03DE in Fish Lake Resort, Utah
- K03DI-D in Chelan Butte, Washington
- K03DO in Hoehne, Colorado
- K03EK in Newberry Springs, California
- K03FF in Koosharem, Utah
- K03FJ in Gakona, etc., Alaska
- K03FM-D in Haines, Alaska
- K03FR in La Veta, Colorado
- K03FU in Mountain Gate, etc., California
- K03GK in McKinley Park, Alaska
- K03GO in Circle Hot Springs, Alaska
- K03GP-D in Sheldon Point, Alaska
- K03GX in Mountain View, Wyoming
- K03HQ in Samak, Utah
- K03HY-D in San Francisco, California
- K03IR-D in Bakersfield, California
- K03IS-D in Sioux City, Iowa
- K03IU-D in San Bernardino, California
- K03IZ-D in Salinas, California
- KEAP-LP in Eagle Pass, Texas
- KHPK-LD in De Soto, Texas
- KVTU-LD in Agoura Hills, California
- W03AO in Madison, Florida
- WBCF-LP in Florence, Alabama
