= Nuno Mendes (chef) =

Portuguese chef (born 1973)

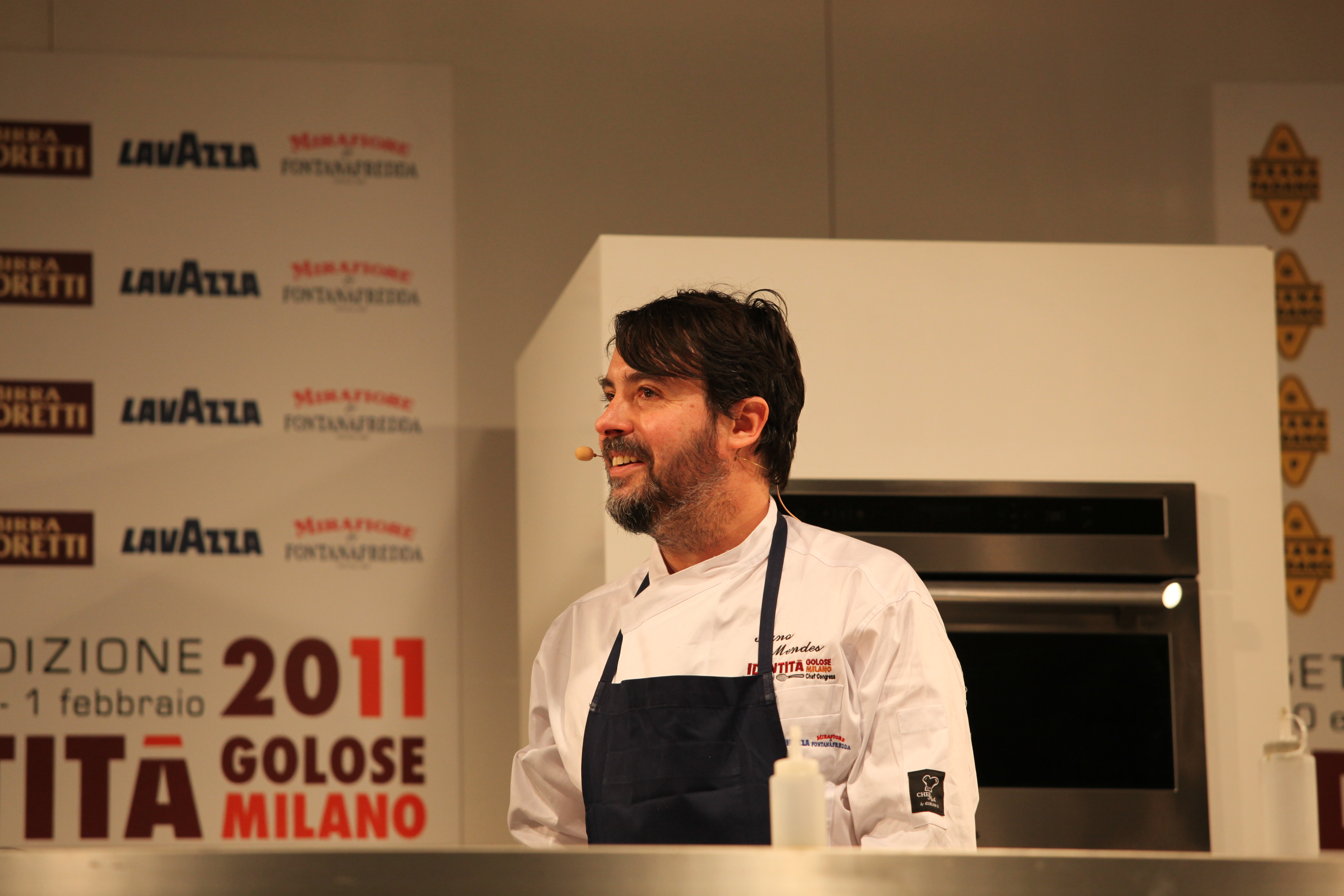
Mendes in 2011

Nuno Mendes (born 1973) is a London-based Portuguese chef, former executive chef at Chiltern Firehouse, London.

== Early life ==
Nuno Mendes was born and raised in Lisbon, Portugal.

== Career ==
Mendes was trained at the California Culinary Academy in the 1990s, worked at elBulli, and has worked with Wolfgang Puck, Rocco di Spirito, and Jean-Georges Vongerichten. In 2006, Mendes opened Bacchus, a gastropub in Hoxton, and later opened The Loft Project, from his own apartment in Shoreditch, "where some of the best chefs cooked in front of guests, offering a pioneering and intimate experience".

In 2010, Mendes opened Viajante (Portuguese for "traveller") in Bethnal Green’s Town Hall Hotel, inspired by world cuisines. In its first year it received a Michelin star and was included in the 2013 World's 50 Best Restaurants. One critic said of the restaurant, "Nuno Mendes has brought a taste of El Bulli to the East End". Giles Coren of The Times referred to Mendes as "every restaurant critic's secret favourite cook".

In March 2022, Mendes opened a Portuguese restaurant, Lisboeta on Charlotte Street, London.

== Personal life ==
Mendes has a daughter and twin sons, with his partner Clarise, a South African stylist.

== Selected works ==
- Mendes, Nuno; Balazs, Andre (2017). Chiltern firehouse: the cookbook. London. ISBN 9781607749936.
- Mendes, Nuno (2017). Lisboeta: recipes from Portugal's City of Light. London. ISBN 9781408877012.
- Mendes, Nuno (2018). My Lisbon: a cookbook from Portugal's City of Light. London. ISBN 9780399581717.
