= Canal 3 (Portugal) =

Proposed Portuguese television channel

Canal 3 (Channel 3) was a Portuguese commercial television project financed by Emaudio and British print tycoon Robert Maxwell's company European Television. Unlike the other contenders for the private television license, Canal 3 was going to broadcast by satellite from abroad instead of using a terrestrial network in Portugal. Broadcasts were initially scheduled to start in 1988, later delayed to 1989 due to technical issues before being scrapped.

== History ==
The Portuguese government in 1986 decided to pass a law reducing government influence in the media sector, opening television to private groups.

One of the bidders that showed interest was Emaudio, a Portuguese company with links to one of Portugal's largest printing groups. On September 23, 1987, Maxwell signed an agreement in Portugal, securing key media assets: a television channel, radio stations and newspapers, which were on track to be privatized. Maxwell's company BPCC was investing hundreds of millions of dollars in these assets. Rui Mateus of the opposition PS party turned down an approach with Rupert Murdoch but said that Maxwell's proposal for a third television channel was seen as an opportunity to improve the reputation of Portuguese productions abroad. BPCC also had a controlling stake in the newly privatized TF1, and used that stake to gain the concession in Portugal. Maxwell invested in the construction of potential studios for the channel as well as video film production facilities. João Tito de Morais and Raul Junqueiro were appointed presidents of the new channel.

In June 1988, Emaudio planned to start Canal 3 by November that year. In its experimental phase, in a period of five months, the channel would broadcast for six hours a day. As the government hadn't legalized private television stations yet, to circumvent problems in Portugal, it was determined that the broadcast of the channel was set to be done from either London or Luxembourg. Programming in its initial phase was to be limited to news, entertainment and cultural programs. In September, Canal 3 announced that the launch of the channel has been delayed to the first half of 1989. The delay was due to the choice of the satellite Emaudio wanted to use. Emaudio had ruled out Intelsat, due to its unfavorable orbit, being reduced to three options: Astra, Pananual and Eutelsat. The directives of the channel had said that, three years after its launch, it would legally broadcast from Portugal with a Portuguese license. Until then, it would use satellite broadcasts from its overseas facility and would later feed the satellite signal to a terrestrial transmitter network.

Maxwell visited Portugal again in August 1989, with the new launch date set for November. He later divested from his failed Portuguese media assets and Canal 3 was ultimately shelved.
