= Canal 3 Niger =

Private television channel

- Niamey; Niger

Programming
- Languages: French and local languages

Ownership
- Owner: Radio Télévision Canal 3 (Fadoul Africa Group)
- Sister stations: Canal 3 Bénin

History
- Founded: 11 July 2008

Canal 3 Niger is a Nigerien private television channel owned by Radio Télévision Canal 3. The channel is a partner of Télé Diffusion du Niger, which enables the channel to be distributed over digital terrestrial television.

== History ==
Canal 3 Niger officially received its operating license on 11 July 2008, initially broadcasting on UHF channel 35 in the capital city, Niamey. To achieve national reach, Canal 3 Niger expanded its distribution via the Intelsat 901 satellite and later Badr 8, allowing its signal to be received across the country and by the Nigerien diaspora.

The station is an active member of the Association des Promoteurs des Radios et Télévisions Privées du Niger (APRTPN), an organization dedicated to the interests of private broadcasters in the country. In August 2017, the station signaled its commitment to professional development by launching a training workshop for aspiring journalists and technical staff.

== Programming ==
Canal 3 Niger focuses on a mix of news, cultural content, and political debate. A significant portion of its broadcast schedule is dedicated to local productions in French and local languages.

Baromètre des membres du gouvernement: Since the mid-2010s, the channel has aired this annual flagship program. It provides an informal assessment of government performance, featuring analysis and critiques of various ministries.

News and Current Affairs: The channel is known for its coverage of national social issues and development.Cultural Content: Following the editorial line of the Fadoul Africa Group, the channel promotes African cultural values through variety shows and documentaries.

In August 2017, the channel opened a training workshop for future journalists.

== Controversies and Legal Issues ==
=== Labor Disputes (2024) ===
In April 2024, Canal 3 Niger faced internal turmoil when 36 staff members were dismissed following a strike over unpaid salaries. Management cited "insubordination" and "breach of contract" as the grounds for the terminations, leading to significant local media coverage regarding labor rights in the private sector. The channel sacked 36 staff following a salary strike due to "insubordination" and "breach of contract".

=== Government Suspension (2025) ===
In January 2025, the channel faced a one-month suspension ordered by the Ministry of Communication. The sanction followed the broadcast of the 2024 edition of Baromètre des membres du gouvernement on 16 January 2025, which reportedly drew criticism from the communications minister.

The channel's editor-in-chief, Seyni Amadou, was taken into custody on 18 January and his professional press card was suspended for three months. Following international pressure and advocacy from groups like Reporters Without Borders (RSF), Amadou was released on 20 January, and the government lifted the channel's suspension shortly thereafter

== Distribution ==
Canal 3 Niger is available through multiple platforms:

Digital Terrestrial Television (DTT): Distributed via the TDN network.

Satellite: Broadcast via Badr 8 (26.0°E) and previously via SES and Intelsat fleets.

Subscription Services: Included in regional packages such as SeeAfrika and local multivision operators.
