= RTS 1 (Senegalese TV channel) =

- Country: Senegal

Programming
- Languages: French; Wolof

Ownership
- Owner: Radiodiffusion Télévision Sénégalaise
- Sister channels: RTS 2 RTS 3 RTS 4 RTS 5

History
- Launched: August 24, 1972; 53 years ago
- Former names: ORTS (1973-1992); RTS (1992-2000)

Links
- Website: www.rts.sn

RTS 1 (formerly ORTS and RTS) is the main channel of Senegalese broadcaster Radiodiffusion Télévision Sénégalaise. It was the only television channel in the country until 1991, when Canal Horizons set up a relay station there, and the only truly Senegalese TV station until 2003.

== History ==
When Senegal achieved independence in 1960, president Léopold Sédar Senghor announced plans to create a national television network, which was due to be on air on 24 December 1962. A Senegalese team had set up a television studio at Radio Sénégal's offices, which was visited by OCORA head Guy Bernède. However, a political crisis plagued Senegal opposing Senghor to prime minister Mamadou Dia, the latter of which was subsequently put under arrest and jailed. After these events, television in Senegal was not seen as a priority and the agreement with OCORA was suspended.

In February 1965, the Senegalese government, in association with UNESCO, began its first television broadcasts, with health and nutrition programmes in Wolof, aimed largely at women's teleclubs in the Dakar area. This phase ended in January 1970 owing to cost issues, and Radio Sénégal announced its intent to take over its infrastructure. A work group on the future of the educational television station was created in January 1971 which recommended its merger with Radio Sénégal. After that, the 1972 Summer Olympics gave the government the establishment of a regular service, by installing a satellite station at Gandoul, and later, in a second phase, the signal would reach Thiès and Ziguinchor. The first experimental broadcasts took place on 24 August 1972, a few days ahead of the start of the Games, toggling between films made by the Film Service of the Ministry of Information, and the channel's test card, between 8pm and 10pm. On 26 August, it broadcast the opening ceremony of the Games in the afternoon live via satellite; all successive coverage was limited to filmed highlights that broadcast at around 2pm and in the evening. Evening broadcasts started shortly after 8pm and ended between 11pm and midnight; the news also began on 26 August and broadcast nightly at 9pm. The station broadcast on VHF channel 7 from the Dakar transmitter.

With the creation of Office de Radiodiffusion Télévision Sénégalaise in 1973, the service was developed. Only a few people in the Dakar/Cap-Vert area were able to own a television set, as sets were deemed expensive, and ORTS had difficulties expanding the television coverage area to a national scale. Most programmes were imported from France

ORTS was renamed RTS in 1992, before changing to its current name in 2001. The channel was the host of Telefood 1998, which was co-produced with RAI's international arm for the FAO. RTS 1 introduced a new schedule in July 2001. Among the changes were the increase of news editions in French from two to three, 12 hours of programming on weekdays, 14 on Wednesdays and 15 on weekends (extending past midnight) and improved sports programming. At the time of the new schedule, RTS had bought a package of 52 feature films, mostly American and released less than two years before showing.

As of 2005, RTS 1 was notable for airing Waxtaan, a daily talk show for and by women, in which the entire staff was female. Topics included beauty, health and women's rights. At the time, the channel was losing its place to the newly-created 2sTV, a channel which was known for "informing people, here and now, without taboos". Interest in the RTS news service was waning, as more people were starting to get their information from private channels, as the state broadcaster was long since been considered a propaganda instrument. In addition to the existing French service, RTS 1 carried news services two times a day in six regional languages: Pulaar, Wolof (the language Senegalese understand the most), Serer, Soninke, Dyula and Maninka. A substantial amount of programmes on RTS 1 was also in Wolof.

Telenovelas dominate the early evening schedule, by 2005, it was the Argentine series Muñeca brava. However, series produced in other Francophone countries in the region, such as the Ivory Coast, Burkina Faso and Cameroon were increasingly seen, even though these thwarted productions made in Senegal and in the Wolof language, since at least the early 2000s. To counter this influence, RTS 1 launched Peul bou rafèèt (The Beautiful Farmer), shown nightly in five-minute episodes before the evening news. The series was about a cattle farmer from northern Senegal who wanted to try his luck in Dakar and falls for a conman.

In 2012, CNSA adverted the channel to air certain images only after 10pm in order to protect the integrity of the youth.

A November 2015 survey placed RTS 1 in third place (21,2%) among a sample of 1,933 Senegalese, behind private channels 2sTV and TFM.

On the eve of the start of the 2022 FIFA World Cup, it started HD broadcasts on Canal+ Sénégal.
