= Canal 3 (Burkinabè TV channel) =

- Country: Burkina Faso

History
- Launched: 20 March 2000

Canal 3 is a Burkina Faso television channel. The channel began broadcasting on March 20, 2000.
