= 2sTV =

Senegalese television channel

- Country: Senegal
- Headquarters: 1, Avenue Abdoulaye Fadiga; B.P. 8308 Dakar Yoff

Programming
- Language(s): French

History
- Launched: 21 June 2003

Links
- Website: www.2stv.net

2sTV is the second television channel of Senegal.

It is owned 100% by El hadji Ibrahima Ndiaye, the administrator of the channel.

== Beginnings ==
RTS planned the creation of a second television network as early as 2001, when Matar Silla, the new president of the corporation, suggested the creation of RTS2.

In 2003, the first programmes were shown on UHF channel 23. The station was at first a partnership between the historic television channel of Senegal, Radiodiffusion Télévision Sénégalaise (RTS) and a private group, "Origine SA". The channel was named: RTS2S.

== Development ==
The channel showed its independence with a new name: 2sTV. The programmes it showed were more focused on culture, freer, and newer. Programming such as Show tout Chaud and Elles sont toutes belles, as well as Allo Bombay on Bollywood entertainment helped make the channel more attractive than the state channel RTS1. In compliance with educational content requirements, the channel aired .sn, a weekly five-minute program providing tutorials to make IT accessible for a wider sector of the population.

== Programmes ==
Mainly, cultural programmes, interviews with local music and other artistic stars, and talkshows. These programmes are mainly in Wolof. The interviews are translated into French, as Senegal is Francophone. However, sometimes a show in Pulaar is included on the schedules. "Yella" - is presented every Sunday at 14h00 (local time) by the Halpulaar personality Farba Sally Seck. It deals with the history of Fouta (a region in the north-east of Senegal) and of the Fulas, accompanied by a "bammbaado" (a "hoddu" or "xalam" player) and a famous personality from Boundou (south-east of Senegal) who, with his two sons, sings the "yeela" songs, on the theme, or the local history.

== Series ==
- vaihedy
- Tout le monde déteste Chris
- Lost
- La Belle Mère
- tourbillon de passion
- Show Tout Chaud
- vaihedy

== Organisation ==
In March 2007, Aziz Samb left RTS after 14 years of service to join the group as an external contractor.

== Headquarters ==
The channel is based in the business quarter close to the Banque Centrale des États de l’Afrique de l’Ouest (BCEAO) in the centre of Dakar.

== See also ==
- Radiodiffusion Télévision Sénégalaise
- Canal France International
- Media of Senegal
