= List of Persian-language television channels =

This is a list of Persian-language television channels organized by country of origin. This list may include active and defunct channels.

== Iran-based television channels ==
- Al-Alam News Network (Arabic language news channel)
- Al-Kawthar TV (Arabic channel)
- Arezo Tv
- HispanTV (Spanish language news channel)
- IFilm TV (entertainment network which consists of four channels in English, Arabic, Persian and Dari language)
- IRIB Amoozesh (education channel)
- IRIB Azerbaijan TV
- IRIB Iran Kala (Iran goods channel)
- IRIB Mahabad TV
- IRIB Mostanad (documentary channel)
- IRIB Namayesh (movie and TV series channel)
- IRIB Nasim (fun and entertainment channel)
- IRIB Ofogh (cultural, artistic and Social channel)
- IRIB Omid (teenager channel)
- IRIB Pooya & Nahal (young children channel)
- IRIB Quran (religion and life channel)
- IRIB Sabalan TV
- IRIB Salamat (health and fun channel)
- IRIB Shoma (cultural channel)
- IRIB Tabarestan TV
- IRIB Tamasha (TV series channel)
- IRIB TV1 (Iranian's channel)
- IRIB TV2 (life channel)
- IRIB TV3 (youth channel)
- IRIB TV4 (educated people's channel)
- IRIB TV5/Tehran TV (local Tehran channel)
- IRIB Varzesh (sports channel)
- IRINN (news channel)
- Jame Jam TV (targeted to European, American and Asian/Oceanian audiences)
- MIFA
- Press TV (English language news channel)
- Saba TV Network
- Sahar TV (multiple languages)
- Salaam TV
- Shamshad TV
- Tamadon TV
- YourTV

== United Kingdom-based television channels ==
- BBC Persian Television (United Kingdom, 2009)
- BBC World News (United Kingdom)
- Iran International (United Kingdom, 2017)
- KalemehTV (United Kingdom)
- Manoto 1 (London, 2010)
- Manoto 2 (London, 2010–2011)
- Persian Toon (United Kingdom)

== United States-based television channels ==
- Andisheh TV (Los Angeles, 2006–2017)
- IRTV (Los Angeles, 1981–?)
- Jaam-e-Jam (Los Angeles, early 1980s–2017)
- MTC (television) (California)
- Omid-e-Iran OITN (Tarzana, California; 1995–present)
- Pars TV (United States)
- Persian Broadcasting Company or "Tapesh" (California, 1989–2016?)
- Radio Javan TV (United States, 2017)
- Royal Time TV (United States)

== Other foreign-based television channels ==
- Al Arabiya Persian Online (Dubai, UAE, 2003)
- Farsi1 (Afghanistan, News Corp, 2009)
- GEM TV (Dubai, 2006)
- ITN1 (Canada)
- ITN2 (Canada)
- MBC Persia (Dubai, UAE, 2008)
- Mohajer International TV (Germany)
- Negin TV (Canada, 2014)
- Nour TV (Dubai, UAE, 2010)
- Persian Music Channel (Dubai)
- Simaye Azadi / Iran National TV (Europe, 1987)

The list of networks overseas by Islamic Republic of Iran Broadcasting is also available.

== See also ==
- Lists of television channels
- Television in Afghanistan
- Television in Iran
