= List of IRIB television channels =

The Islamic Republic of Iran Broadcasting (IRIB) media corporation operates a range of nationwide and provincial television channels in Iran, and also broadcasts to other countries.

== Domestic channels ==
- IRIB TV1 (Main Channel)
- IRIB TV2 (Life Channel)
- IRIB TV3 (Youth Channel)
- IRIB TV4 (Educated People's Channel)
- IRINN (News Channel)
- IRINN 2 (Live News Channel)
- IRIB Amoozesh (Education Channel)
- IRIB Quran (Religion and Life Channel)
- IRIB Mostanad (Documentary Channel)
- IRIB Namayesh (Movie and TV Series Channel)
- IRIB Varzesh (Sports Channel)
- IRIB Pooya & Nahal (Young Children Channel)
- IRIB Salamat (Health and Fun Channel)
- IRIB Tamasha (TV Series Channel)
- IRIB Nasim (Fun and Entertainment Channel)
- IRIB Ofogh (Cultural, Artistic and Social Channel)
- IRIB Omid (Teenager Channel)
- iFilm (Entertainment Channel in Persian Language)
- IRIB UHD-HDR (4K Channel)

== Foreign channels ==
- iFilm (Entertainment network consisting of three channels in English, Arabic and Dari languages)
- Jame Jam TV (For Iranians abroad)
- Sahar TV (Azeri, Kurdish, Balkan, Dari, Urdu)
- Al-Kawthar TV (Arabic Channel)
- Al-Alam News Network (Arabic Language News Channel)
- Press TV (English and French Language News Channel)
- HispanTV (Spanish Language News Channel)
- Hausa TV (Hausa Language News Channel)
- IranPress (Video news agency)

== Provincial channels ==
- IRIB Sahand TV
- IRIB Azerbaijan TV
- IRIB Sabalan TV
- IRIB Eshragh TV
- IRIB Alborz TV
- IRIB Aflak TV
- IRIB Aftab TV
- IRIB Baran TV
- IRIB Bushehr TV
- IRIB Dena TV
- IRIB Esfahan TV
- IRIB Fars TV
- IRIB Sabz TV
- IRIB Hamoon TV
- IRIB Ilam TV
- IRIB Jahanbin TV
- IRIB Kerman TV
- IRIB Zagros TV
- IRIB Khalije Fars TV
- IRIB Khoozestan TV
- IRIB Khavaran TV
- IRIB Khorasan Razavi TV
- IRIB Atrak TV
- IRIB Kordestan TV
- IRIB Noor TV
- IRIB Qazvin TV
- IRIB Semnan TV
- IRIB Hamedan TV
- IRIB Tabarestan TV
- IRIB Tehran TV
- IRIB Yazd TV
- IRIB Abadan TV (Local Channel)
- IRIB Mahabad TV (Local Channel)
- IRIB Kish TV (Local Channel)

== Closed and merged channels ==
- IRIB Bazaar
- IRIB HD
- IRIB Shoma
- IRIB Iran Kala
