= Television in Iran =

Television was first introduced to Iran in 1958, as a privately owned and commercially operated enterprise, before being nationalised, remaining a state-controlled monopoly, first of National Iranian Radio and Television, and following the Iranian Revolution in 1979, of Islamic Republic of Iran Broadcasting. Television, or more specifically IRIB, is nicknamed "glass wool" by locals, because of the appearance of clerics with long beards comparable to sheep wool, appearing behind the "glass", the television set.

== History ==
=== Television Iran ===
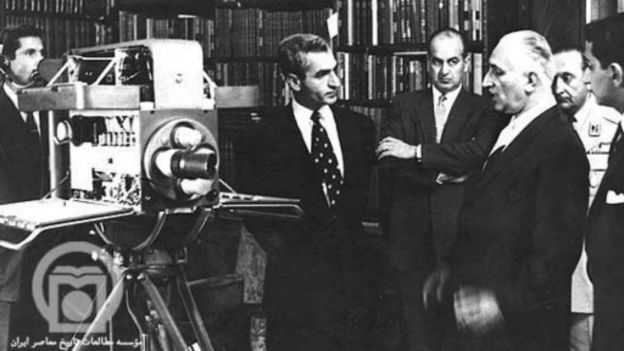
Mohammad Reza Pahlavi with Habib Sabet on visit to television centre, June 1970

On October 3, 1958, Television Iran (TVI) was established, broadcasting from Tehran. A second station, based in Abadan in the south of the country, was established in 1960. Its programming included quiz shows and American programmes dubbed into Persian, and appealed to an unsophisticated audience.

Habib Sabet, a Baháʼí who was one of Iran's major industrialists, was the founder of the first television station. The station manager was an American, A. Vance Hallack, who had previously operated the Baghdad Television Station in Iraq. Before coming to the Middle East, Hallack had managed NBC's colour division.

At its launch, TVI had the sponsorship of numerous blue chip Western companies, such as RCA, General Tire, Pepsi-Cola, Autolite, Squibb and Volkswagen, Sabet having opened the first Pepsi-Cola plant in Iran in 1955. However, by 1963, it claimed to have lost 70 million rials, and its owners attempted to sell the station to the government, but by then it had already approved plans for its own television network.

=== National Iranian Television ===
A separate network, National Iranian Television (NITV), was established in 1966. This catered for a more educated public. On October 26, NITV transmitted its first broadcast message, a statement by the Shah; test programs were run, and complete programming commenced in Nowruz, the Iranian New Year, in March 1967, with the first week's programs included the broadcasting of the Shah's birthday celebrations from Amjadieh Stadium.

=== American Forces Radio and Television Service ===
Until 1976, the American Forces Radio and Television Service (AFRTS) broadcast a television service on Channel 7 in Tehran and the surrounding area from its studios in the city.

Catering for US Armed Forces personnel, this was known as AFTV, and was the only television service in the country then carrying programming in English, as all foreign programming on NITV and TVI, including American and British imports, was dubbed in Persian. In deference to Iranian sensitivities, AFRTS avoided carrying programming that might be construed as offensive on political or religious grounds, instead carrying cowboy or detective movies.

However, in that year it was decided by the Iranian government that AFRTS should close down its radio and TV services, which it did on October 25. These would be replaced by similar services, operated by the state broadcaster.

=== National Iranian Radio and Television ===
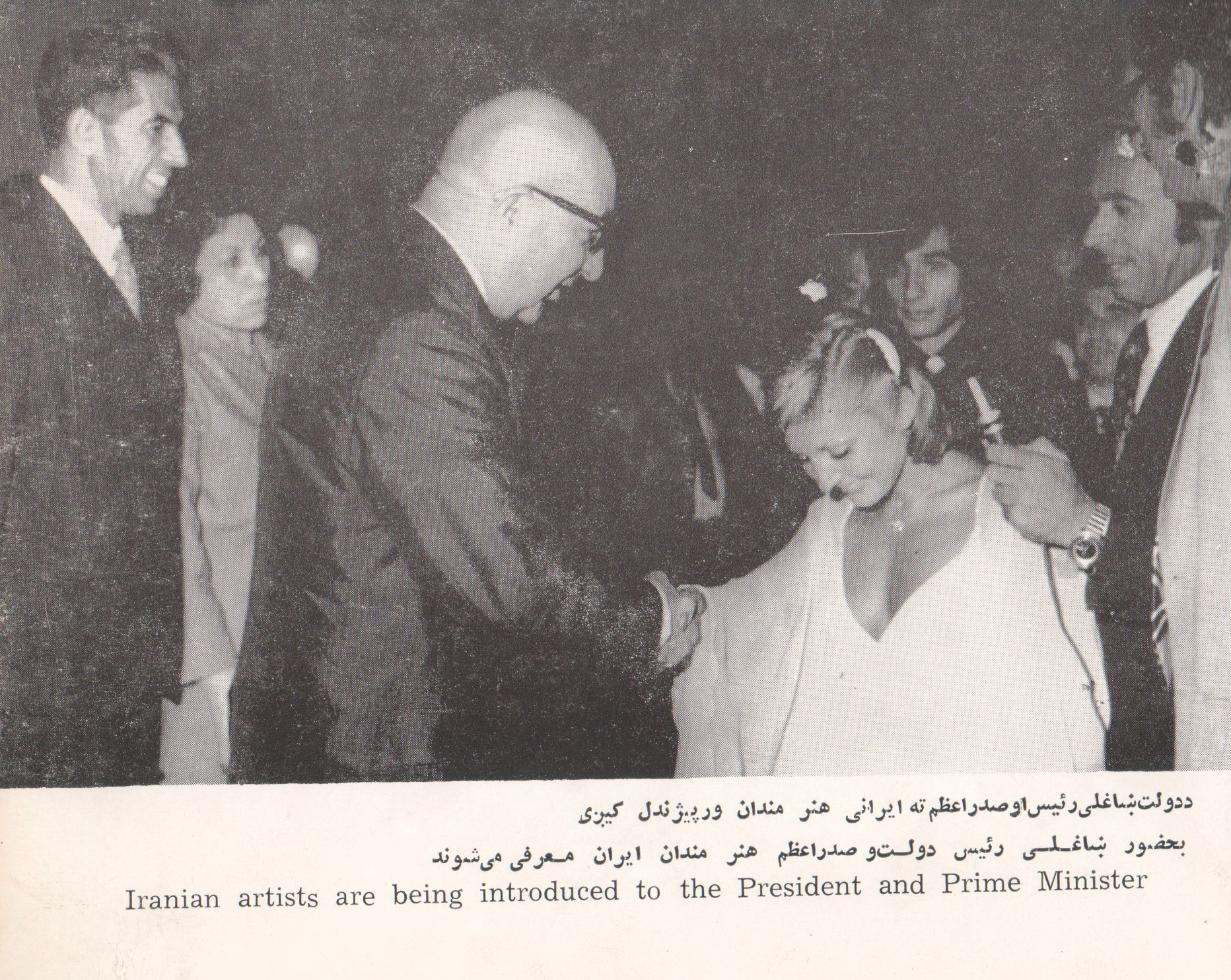
NIRT journalists presenting Iranian artists to President Mohammed Daoud Khan of Afghanistan in the 1970s.

In 1971, NITV was merged with Radio Iran to form a new broadcasting organisation, National Iranian Radio and Television (NIRT). TVI, meanwhile, had been nationalised at the end of April 1969. By that time, the government had come to consider the privately owned station a competitive threat, and bought out Sabet for the sum of 20 million toman, against his initial investment of 70 million toman, with the station's building being taken over by the new Educational Television service.

Prior to 1967, television had covered about 2.1 million people; when NIRT began regular transmissions that year, coverage rose to 4.8 million, and by 1974 had risen to over 15 million, roughly half the total population. The large budget allocations that were provided to NIRT, a reflection of the organisation's role in development, enabled it to use the latest technologies, including microwave delivery systems, to overcome problems of mountainous terrain.

By 1975–76, 70 percent of the population had television reception. Before then, in 1973, NIRT had already established a total of 14 television production centres with 153 transmitters, covering approximately 88 cities and towns in Iran, accounting for 60 per cent of the population. The following year, this had increased to fifteen, including two in Tehran, as well as one each in the provincial cities of Abadan, Ardebil, Bandar Abbas, Esfahan, Kerman, Kermanshah, Shiraz, Mahabad, Mashad, Rasht, Rezaiyeh, Sanandaj, Tabriz and Zahedan.

Earlier, it had aimed for its first television network to reach 65 per cent of the population of Iran, with its second network reaching 50 per cent by the end of 1977, marking the end of the country's Fifth Development Plan.

By 1974, Iran was second only to Japan in Asia in terms of the development of its broadcasting capabilities. This prompted one Western commentator to argue in 1977 that "[if] Iran continues on its present path it will be the first nation in the world to have nationally spread television before a nationally spread press".

Colour television broadcasts first began in 1975, although reception was largely confined to affluent people who are able to afford colour sets. Regular colour broadcasts were introduced in 1976. The standard was changed to the French SECAM in February 1977, resulting in imported television sets becoming unusable. Although NIRT had the facilities to broadcast in colour, and used this when broadcasting the Asian Games held in Tehran in 1974, full broadcasts in colour were delayed until 1978, on account of the ability of local manufacturers to meet the demand for colour sets.

The first NIRT television network, known as the First Program, carried general content, of which only 33 per cent was imported, with the second network or Second Program aiming to show more educational and cultural content, of which 60 per cent of its content was imported.

Although the International Program carried some programming devoted to Iranian culture and education, its output remained broadly similar to that of the AFRTS service it had replaced, with nearly all imported programs from the United States. Broadcast for eight and a half hours daily, most programming was in English, with some films and programs in French and German. This appealed to the 60 000 US Army and civilian personnel then stationed in Iran, as well as the wider population of foreign nationals resident in the country.

=== Islamic Republic of Iran Broadcasting ===
After the 1979 revolution, NIRT was renamed as صدا و سيمای جمهوری اسلامی ايران Seda va Sima-ye Jomhouri-e Eslami-ye Iran ("Voice and Vision of the Islamic Republic of Iran"), known in English as Islamic Republic of Iran Broadcasting (IRIB), and under the new Constitution of the Islamic Republic, radio and television were to be "aligned with the course of perfection of the Islamic Revolution and served the promotion of Islamic culture, and to this end benefit from the healthy collision of different ideas and strictly avoid spreading and propagating destructive and anti-Islamic tenets". A notable censorship episode happened in May 1995, when one of its channels cut the feature film Running 70 minutes in with a black screen. The broadcaster accused the censorship on "technical problems", but the real reason, according to an observation made by the BBC, was the display of athletes wearing shorts and sleeveless tops.

In 1998, Iran changed from using SECAM to the PAL system developed in (Germany), and also used in the United Kingdom.

== Satellite television ==
As a result of IRIB's monopoly and censorship, satellite television channels, most notably Persian language ones based in Europe and North America, have gained popularity in Iran. This was despite the passing of a law in 1994 under which the use and ownership of satellite dishes was banned. At year-end 1994, 200,000 Iranians had access to satellite television; Iranian conservatives compared satellite dishes to American flags, due to the heavy amount of American programming. However, the research centre of IRIB estimates that they were used by up to 70 per cent of Iranian households.

Despite being repeatedly jammed, the BBC Persian channel had a weekly audience of 7.2 million in 2011. GEM TV is one of the most popular satellite channels in Iran. Based in Dubai, it is broadcast illegally into the country. Farsi1, a satellite channel part owned by News Corporation broadcasting mostly comedies and dramas from other Asian countries and Latin America, is one of the most popular stations in the country.

== Satellite television channels ==
- BBC Persian
- Iran International (HD and SD)
- VOA Persian
- MBC Persia
- Radio Farda
- FX HD
- Sci-Fi
- GEM TV
- Manoto
- English Club
- Tapesh TV
- ITN
- Khatereh
- PMC
- Hod Hod
- Imam Hussein TV 1
- Kalemeh
- Nour
- Wesal Haq
- Towheed TV
- Sat7pars
- Iran Farda
- English Club
- Simaye Azadi

=== Defunct television channels ===
- Farsi1
- Zemzemeh
- Nat Geo Farsi

== State-owned television channels ==
- IRIB TV1 (DVB-T)
- IRIB TV2 (DVB-T)
- IRIB TV3 (DVB-T)
- IRIB TV4 (DVB-T)
- IRIB TV5 (DVB-T)
- IRIB Quran (DVB-T)
- IRIB Amoozesh (DVB-T)
- IRINN (DVB-T)
- IRIB Namayesh (DVB-T)
- IRIB Shoma (DVB-T)
- Pooya/Nahal (DVB-T)
- IRIB Omid (DVB-T)
- IRIB Tamasha (DVB-T)
- IRIB Mostanad (DVB-T & Thaicom 8)
- IRIB Ofogh
- IRIB Varzesh
- iFilm
- HispanTV
- Press TV

== Most viewed channels ==
Position	Channel	Share of total viewing (%)
1	MBC Persia	4.8
2	GEM TV	4.2
3	Manoto	3.7
4	IRIB TV3	3.1
5	BBC Persian	2.2
6	IRIB TV1	2.1
7	VOA Persian TV	1.5
8	Iran International	1.0
9	GEM DRAMA	0.7
10	IRIB TV2	0.3

== See also ==
- National Iranian Radio and Television
- Media in Iran
- List of Persian-language television channels
