= Iran Television School =

Educational TV program for Iranian students

- Genre: Educational, Social
- Country of origin: Iran
- Original language: Persian
- No. of episodes: about 300

Production
- Running time: 28 minutes (each class)

Original release
- Network: IRIB Amoozesh
- Release: 29 February 2020 – present

Iran Television School (Persian: مدرسه تلویزیونی ایران) is a television program broadcast on IRIB Amoozesh that is broadcast to Iranian students following the COVID-19 pandemic. The schedule of this program is for Primary school, Middle school and High school.

This program covers all the lessons of each level and is broadcast every day and it is not possible to replay it. However, any part of the program can be downloaded from the network social medias.

== IRIB TV4 ==
Also, a program like this program called Iran School will be broadcast on IRIB TV4.

Iran Television School
- Genre: Educational, Social
- Country of origin: Iran
- Original language: Persian

Production
- Producer: Hamid Eskandari

Original release
- Network: IRIB TV4

== IRIB Quran ==
Also, a similar program is broadcast on the IRIB Quran, with the difference that this program only deals with religious lessons of each level.

Iran Television School
- Genre: Educational, Social
- Country of origin: Iran
- Original language: Persian

Original release
- Network: IRIB Quran

== See also ==
- COVID-19 pandemic in Iran
