= The Silver Man (TV series) =

- Persian: مرد نقره‌ای
- Genre: Crime,Drama
- Written by: Jaber Ghasem Ali
- Directed by: Kazem Masoumi
- Starring: Saeed Nikpour; Nima Shahrokh Shahi; Bahareh Afshari; Pouria Poursorkh; Bijan Ganjali; Sara Soofiani; Hassan Joveireh; Fereydoon Sorani; Afsaneh Salehi; Mohammad Reza Torabi; Jahangir Nekouei
- Country of origin: Iran
- Original language: Persian
- No. of seasons: 1
- No. of episodes: 26

Production
- Producer: Amir Hossein Sharifi
- Production location: Isfahan
- Cinematography: Mohammad Afsari
- Editor: Mehdi Dehghan
- Running time: 40–45 minutes

Original release
- Network: IRIB TV3; Shoma
- Release: 22 July – 21 August 2012

The Silver Man (Persian: مرد نقره‌ای;Mard Noghrehei) is a 2012 Iranian crime, drama TV series directed by Kazem Masoumi. This series has been rebroadcast several times on various networks such as iFilm and Shoma.

== Storyline ==
Hadi Radmanesh (Saeed Nikpour), who owns a carpet factory and is involved in charity work, is seeking to run in the guild elections. Meanwhile, he receives repeated threatening phone calls, calling him Nader Koohzad. Meanwhile, a girl named Noora (Bahareh Afshari) visits his son (Nima Shahrokh Shahi) Danial's Silver shop and, under the pretext of launching a website, tries to win his heart.

== Cast ==
- Saeed Nikpour as Hadi Radmanesh
- Nima Shahrokh Shahi as Danial Radmanesh
- Bahareh Afshari as Noora Fallah
- Pouria Poursorkh as Mehran
- Bijan Ganjali
- Sara Soofiani as Marzieh Golestan
- Hassan Joveireh
- Fereydoon Sorani as Jamshid
- Afsaneh Salehi as Nahid
- Mohammad Reza Torabi as Jamshid's youth
- Jahangir Nekouei
- Amin Zare
- Aram Yousefinia
- Amir Hossein Sharifi
- Behzad Davari
- Mina Faramarzi
- Mahshad Mousavi
- Radmehr Keshani
- Behzad Mohseni
- Mehdi Shahdad
- Hassan Torabi
- Iman Azari
- Zohreh Molavi
- Atefeh Alinejad
- Arefeh Akbari
- Mohammad Rezaei
- Sahel Hassanpour
- Maedeh Mousavi
