= Behind the Tall Mountains =

2012 Iranian TV series

- Persian: پشت کوه‌های بلند
- Genre: History; Comedy,Drama
- Written by: Amrollah Ahmadjoo
- Directed by: Amrollah Ahmadjoo
- Starring: Mahmoud Pak Niat; Hassan Eklili; Anoushirvan Arjmand; Atash Taqipour; Bijan Ganjali; Ferdous Kaviani; Sepideh Mazaheri; Hassan Joveireh; Fereydoon Sorani; Alireza Shoja Nouri; Mahvash Sabrkon; Mahtaj Nojoumi
- Composer: Mani Jafarzadeh
- Country of origin: Iran
- Original language: Persian
- No. of seasons: 1
- No. of episodes: 50

Production
- Producer: Reza Joodi
- Production locations: Isfahan; Meymeh
- Cinematography: Jahanbakhsh Mehrbakhsh
- Editor: Mehdi Joodi
- Running time: 40 minutes

Original release
- Network: IRIB TV3; Shoma
- Release: 1 May – 26 June 2012

Behind the Tall Mountains (Persian: پشت کوه‌های بلند; Poshte Koohaye Boland) is a 2012 Iranian History, Drama and Comedy TV series written and Directed by Amrollah Ahmadjoo. This series has been rebroadcast several times on various networks such as iFilm and Shoma.

== Storyline ==
Hesam Beyg (Mahmoud Pak Niat), with the new name Samsha, is now the king of Iran and he comes to Isfahan to have fun. His caravan is accompanied by his wife, Malek Khatun, and his two children, the Crown Prince and Shahdokhtaroo, the courtier's courtier, Mir Ghazb, and the courtiers, heralds, a music band, and the court kitchen.

Samsha's puppet ruler in Isfahan, who wants to seize the kingdom away from Samsha's eyes, has invited the great Isfahan merchant Khajeh Na'man and the governor of Koulibad to the government house to gain their support and implement his plan...

== Cast ==
- Mahmoud Pak Niat as Samsha
- Hassan Eklili as Hakem
- Anoushirvan Arjmand as Shams Vazir
- Atash Taqipour as GheshonSalar
- Bijan Ganjali as Ghamar Vazir
- Ferdous Kaviani as SafarAli
- Sepideh Mazaheri as Hakem Khatoon
- Hassan Joveireh as Agha Mahmoud
- Fereydoon Sorani as Pishkar Hakem
- Alireza Shoja Nouri as Shirkhan (Moradbeyg)
- Mahvash Sabrkon as Malek Khatun
- Mahtaj Nojoumi as Khaleh leila
- Mohammad Fili as Talkhak Padeshah
- Pari Karbalayee as Daye Khanoom
- Rahim Hoodi as Kaleras
- Danial Hajibarat as Hekmat
- Seifollah Namdari as Khajeh Haramkhan
- Behrouz Masrouri
- Parviz Bozorgi
- Hamed Ahmadjoo
- Asieh Kalani
- Esmail Movahedi
- Rasoul Zare
- Saeed Yardosti
- Morteza Reihani
