= Hasht Behesht (TV series) =

2012 TV Series

- Persian: هشت بهشت
- Genre: Comedy
- Written by: Ali Hosseini
- Directed by: Saeed Alemzadeh
- Starring: Hushang Harirchiyan; Hassan Eklili; Afshin Sangchap; Alireza Jafari; Mani Heidari; Afsaneh Naseri; Mehdi Saki; Mohammad Reza Zhaleh; Azadeh Riazi; Hassan Joveireh; Farajollah Golsefidi
- Composer: Mohammad Mehdi Goorangi
- Country of origin: Iran
- Original language: Persian
- No. of seasons: 1
- No. of episodes: 26

Production
- Producers: Amir Hossein Sharifi; Production Manager: Danial Hajibarat
- Production location: Isfahan
- Cinematography: Esmaeel Aghajani
- Editor: Mehdi Dehghan
- Running time: 35-40 minutes

Original release
- Release: 20 July – 19 August 2012

Hasht Behesht (Persian: هشت‌بهشت, lit. 'the Eight Heavens') is an Iranian comedy series. The series is directed by Saeed Alemzadeh.

== About the series ==
The series was supposed to be made in three 30-episode seasons, but only one season was made. The season aired on Channel IRIB Shoma in 2012 and has since been rebroadcast on Channel IRIB TV3 and iFilm. Almost 50 actors have played roles in this series.

== Storyline ==
There is a bazaar called the exhibition of handicrafts and food, which is specific to all Iranian ethnic groups, and all ethnic groups participate in this exhibition. There are two hotels near the bazaar that belong to two brothers who have a dispute over their father's inheritance. The existence of a bazaar and the arrival of Iranian tribes from other cities causes another competition between these two brothers, which creates interesting events.

== Cast ==
- Hushang Harirchiyan
- Hassan Eklili
- Afshin Sangchap
- Alireza Jafari
- Mani Heidari
- Afsaneh Naseri
- Mehdi Saki
- Mohammad Reza Zhaleh
- Azadeh Riazi
- Hassan Joveireh
- Farajollah Golsefidi
- Dariush Movafagh
- Danial Hajibarat
- Sanaz Zarrinmehr
- Mana Bahrami
- Iman Mortazavi
- Zohreh Molavi
- Pari Karbalaei
- Vanoosheh Vahedi
- Aram Yousefinia
