= Citizen and Mafia =

- Genre: Mafia; Reality; Educational
- Written by: Sevil Amina
- Directed by: Afshin Arbabi (Season 1); Mohammad Rajaei
- Judges: Pedram Fayazi; Sina Motallem; Navid Pournik; Pedram Sadeghi; Nader Modir (Seasons 2 to 4)
- Narrated by: Alirum Nouraei
- Country of origin: Iran
- Original language: Persian
- No. of seasons: 11
- No. of episodes: 258

Production
- Producer: Alireza Soltani
- Running time: 60 minutes

Original release
- Network: IRIB Salamat
- Release: 28 September 2019 – present

Citizen and Mafia (Persian: شهروند و مافیا, "Shahrvand Va Mafia") (formerly: Mafia) is an Iranian television contest that airs every night at 7 pm and repeats at 11 pm on IRIB Salamat. This program is directed by Mohammad Rajaei and produced by Alireza Soltani. Behnam Tashakkor was in charge of performing the first season of this program, which went on the air under the name of "Mafia", and Alirum Nouraei is in charge of narrating the second season of this program called "Citizen and Mafia" And the game model in the first season was a classic Mafia game. But in the following seasons, new characters came into play. After the broadcast of this match on TV, this style of play has become known as the game of Citizen and Mafia with the scenario of IRIB. In this game, there are no independent roles such as Werewolf, Syndicate, and..., and there are only two groups, Citizen and Mafia. However, the game does not have many famous characters such as Natasha, priest, butler and terrorist. In the tenth season, the game scenario has changed and roles such as Commando, Guard, NATO, Rifleman have been added to the game.

== Game roles ==
=== Seasons 1 to 9 ===
==== Mafia roles ====
Mafia boss:

The head of the Mafia has the most powerful role among the Mafia. His inquiry is negative for the Detective, and if he is hit by a sniper at night, no one will leave the game.

Negotiator:

After the departure of one of their teammates and the presence of a negotiator in the game, the Mafia group can negotiate with a citizen to join the Mafia team. Negotiation will be successful if it is done with a simple or armored citizen.

Simple Mafia:

Simple Mafia is one of the Mafia team, but it does not have unique capabilities.

==== Citizenship roles ====
Detective:

The game detective wakes up every night and takes an inquiry from one of the game's characters from the narrator. The detective points to one of the players who guesses he is a Mafia, and the narrator nods in response to show him whether he guessed correctly and whether the person is a member of the Mafia. The inquiry of the negotiating mafia and the simple mafia is positive and the inquiry of the mafia boss is always negative.

Armored:

The armor does not go out at night with the mafia shot and does not leave the game only once a day with the vote of the city, and after that the armor loses its effect. In season two of the Shahrvand Va Mafia match, the armor at night, like during the day, if it was hit once by the Mafia, the armor would lose its effect. If the role of armor is exposed during the day, it is not possible for the Mafia to negotiate with him.

Reporter:

After the negotiation by the Mafia group, the reporter wakes up every night to inquire about the role of the negotiator and takes a question from a narrator.

Sniper:

The sniper wakes up every night with the announcement of the narrator and has only one shot in the whole game. If a citizen is targeted by a sniper, he himself is out of the game. If the mafia boss is targeted, no one will be out of the game.

Doctor:

The game doctor wakes up every night and in the first two nights or until the number of players is less than 8, he can save 2 people and in the following nights he can only save one person. He has to guess who the Mafia shot and choose to save him. If the doctor can guess correctly, the narrator will announce during the day phase that no one was out of the game last night. Doctor can save himself only twice during the game.

Simple citizen:

The simple citizen is one of the few citizens and has not been given any unique characteristics and abilities. Some players in the Shahrvand Va Mafia match welcome the role to challenge their ability to play.

=== Season 10 ===
==== Mafia roles ====
Mafia boss:

Mafia boss has the most powerful role among the Mafia. His inquiry is negative for the detective and he will not leave the game if he is hit by a Ranger at night.

NATO:

Once a night, NATO can use its role and guess a person with the role, with the approval of the mafia boss. If he guesses correctly, that role will be removed from the game in any case, and the doctor's rescue will not affect his stay. If he guesses wrong, that night the Mafia and NATO role will be destroyed.

Hostage taker:

The hostage-taker wakes up every night during the game and takes on the role of a hostage. A hostage-taker is awakened when he wakes up and is unable to use his role that night. The hostage-taker does not wake up with the other mafias and only gets the approval of his accomplices, and his accomplices also wake up and get the approval of the hostage-taker.

==== Citizenship roles ====
Detective:

Detective wakes up every night and takes an inquiry from one of the game's characters from the narrator. The detective points to one of the players who guesses he is a Mafia, and the narrator nods in response to show him whether he guessed correctly and whether the person is a member of the Mafia. The inquiry of NATO and the hostage-taker is positive and the inquiry of the Mafia boss is always negative.

Rifleman:

The rifleman in the game has a combat arrow and an infinite number of practice arrows. The gunman is the bearer of the gun. He wakes up every night and finally gives two people guns so they can have guns tomorrow. The next day, before the voting, those two people can raise their hands and announce that they have a gun and want to use their gun, and they will target one person. If a person has a gun, if his gun is a war weapon, he wills his goal and leaves the game, and his role will be announced to the city. Nothing happens if he has a training gun. The gunsmith can also give himself a practice gun to avoid his role for the Mafia.

Guard:

The guard wakes up every night and can guard as many as the narrator says (from 10 to 8 people 2 choices and from 7 people down 1 choice). The guard must try to find the players in the game correctly and guard their role against the hostage-taker. If the guard can properly guard the role declared by the hostage-taker, that role will not be taken hostage. If the guard can find the hostage-taker at night, the hostage-taker will not be able to use his role that night. If the guard leaves the game in any way during the day, he loses his role and remains in the game as a simple citizen and can no longer use his role at night.

Commando:

The Commando wakes up every night and the narrator informs him whether he has been targeted by the Mafia team or not. If one night is targeted by the Mafia team, that night he can shoot someone. Nothing happens if he targets the mafia boss, but if he hits NATO or the hostage-taker, that role is out of the question. He can also state that he does not want to use his arrow, that if the doctor saves him, he will stay in the game and if he does not save, he will leave the game. If a citizen is shot, he will be out of the game anyway.

Doctor:

Doctor wakes up every night and can save 2 people until the number of players is less than 8, and in the following nights it is only possible to save one person. He has to guess who the Mafia shot and choose to save him. If the doctor can guess correctly, the narrator will announce during the day phase that no one was out of the game last night. The doctor can save himself only twice during the game.

Simple citizen:

The simple citizen is one of the few citizens and has not been given any unique characteristics and abilities. Some players in the Shahrvand Va Mafia match welcome the role to challenge their ability to play.

== How to do the contest ==
In this game, people are divided into mafia groups and citizens, and the battle between conscious and unconscious groups is simulated. In this contest, people are secretly assigned roles and the majority of citizens have the opportunity to identify mafia members and vote to remove them. During the day phase, all surviving players discuss mafia identities and vote to remove a suspect.

In short, the ultimate goal of the Mafia game is to eliminate, or in other words, to improve the "citizens" game by the Mafia group, or vice versa, to eliminate the game mafias by the citizens.

In the Shahrvand Va Mafia style of play, with the scenario of IRIB, after assigning a role to each of the players, on the first day, each player introduces himself and his mafia suspicions. The first day is the day of introduction and no voting takes place. On the first night, with the announcement of the narrator of the Mafia group, and after that, other characters wake up in order. The first night of the game is the night of the introduction and Thierry is not shot by the Mafia.

On the second day and the following days, citizens discuss their suspects in two rounds of play and challenge to discover the Mafia group. After the players have commented, one or more people go to court to defend themselves by a majority vote. Each player defends himself on the court and makes his arguments. After the defense, by re-voting, if one of the players wins the quorum, he will be expelled from the game. It is possible for each player to say the last words before leaving the game on the day.

Immediately after the start of the day phase, it is possible to inquire twice about the number of citizens and mafias out of the game; Which helps to guide the remaining players in the game to the positions of those present.

The exit of a mafia at night is announced by the narrator with a sniper rifle, and the players realize that the announced victim has been shot with a sniper rifle.

When the number of Mafia players and the number of citizen players are equal, the game ends with the victory of the Mafia group. If the number of players in the game reaches three, consisting of two citizens and a mafia, on the last day, the players talk freely for two minutes, and finally it is determined by performing the task of shake hands the citizen or the mafia.

Mentioning the role during the expression of statements during the day is prohibited in any way and if it occurs, it will result in disciplinary dismissal from the game.

== Game terms ==
Mafia Push: The so-called mafia pressure to get the citizen out of the game by any trick possible.

Fact: Each player makes arguments based on the statements of other players and their perceptions to identify their suspects.

Turn: This is the turn to speak in the game.

Challenge: In the turn of the game, each player has an extra time to allow other players to speak and respond. This term is called the challenge period.

Night Shot: The word night shot means the same as night murdered.

Heal or Save: The rescue of citizens at night by a doctor is called Heal or Save.

Like: A player agrees with a person's words and shows the Like icon for confirmation.

Dislike: A player disagrees with a person. Displays the dislike symbol for disapproval.

Target: When a player accuses another player of being a Mafia, he is so-called targeted.

Target Back: It means accusing a player of the player he has accused.

Scenario: Each Mafia game can have its own role, process and mechanism. There is a lot of variety between Mafia game plans. With each different arrangement of plans, a new mafia game can be arranged. The meaning of the scenario in Mafia game is the same different combinations of plans and game trends.

Night Act: Any sound, movement or trace taken from the players' behavior in the night phase is called the night act.

Surfing: When a discussion starts with one person and the next people talk about it, they say that a wave has been created. Meanwhile, anyone who wants to use the wave and ride it, despite his own belief in it, is said to be riding the wave.

Axing: When a person expresses his opinion very sharply and repeatedly against the phase and the collective opinion, it is said that he is axing, that is, something is taking root and growing, but that person is constantly axing it and does not allow it to stand. The correctness of that person's axing is determined after the game. An ax in itself does not mean bad.

Noob: Noob means novice. That is, someone who is not very skilled in a particular field and has not gained much experience.

Knot: In the Mafia game, sometimes there is an ambiguity between two or more people that neither side of the ambiguity can be easily identified correctly. This is the case in such a way that from every point of view, it seems that the person is right and his words cannot be easily rejected.

Beheading: A beheading occurs when a player resolutely wants to throw another player he thinks is a mafia out of the game and assumes all the consequences of that player leaving.

Lifting role: When a player indirectly (or sometimes directly) mentions in his speech that he has a role, it is said that he has raised the role.

== Contest narrator ==
The narrator of this contest was initially Behnam Tashakkor, an actor in Iranian cinema. In the new series of this contest, because Behnam Tashakkor was working on a film project, Alirum Nouraei replaced him.

== Review of seasons ==
Season	Day and time of broadcast	The beginning of the season	The end of the season	The narrator	Number of episodes broadcast	Episode range	TV season	TV Channel
1	Every day 20:00, repeat 23:00	28 September 2019	31 October 2019	Behnam Tashakkor	32	1–32	2019	IRIB Salamat
2	Every day 20:00, repeat 23:00	11 February 2020	13 March 2020	Alirum Nouraei	32	33–64	2020	IRIB Salamat
3	Every day 20:00, repeat 24:00	20 March 2020	6 April 2020	Alirum Nouraei	18	65–82	2020	IRIB Salamat
4	Every day 19:00, repeat 23:00	20 April 2020	26 May 2020	Alirum Nouraei	32	83–114	2020	IRIB Salamat
5	Every day 19:00, repeat 23:00	3 October 2020	8 November 2020	Alirum Nouraei	32	115–146	2020	IRIB Salamat
6	Every day 19:00, repeat 23:00	13 November 2020	14 December 2020	Alirum Nouraei	32	147–178	2020	IRIB Salamat
7	Every day 19:00, repeat 23:00	19 December 2020	21 January 2021	Alirum Nouraei	32	179–210	2020–2021	IRIB Salamat
8	Every day 19:00, repeat 23:00	30 January 2021	4 March 2021	Alirum Nouraei	32	211–242	2021	IRIB Salamat
9	Every day 19:00, repeat 23:00	20 March 2021	4 April 2021	Alirum Nouraei	16	243–258	2021	IRIB Salamat
10	Every day 17:50, repeat 22:50	14 April 2021		Alirum Nouraei	32	259–	2021	IRIB Salamat

=== Season Final ===
==== Season 1 (September–October 2019) ====
Participants in the final:

Participant	Number	Role
Mohsen Vojoudi	1	Simple citizen
Ali Zare	2	Simple citizen
Pedram Fayazi	3	Doctor
Akbar Banaei	4	Simple citizen
Ali Naderkhani	5	Simple citizen
Behrooz Ghaemi	6	Detective
Ali Yousefi	7	Simple Mafia
Massoud Fayuzat	8	Mafia boss
Foad Sokan	9	Simple Mafia
Ali Javanshir	10	Simple citizen

Result: Citizen win

==== Season 2 (February–March 2020) ====
Participants in the final:

Participant	Number	Role
Khashayar	1	Reporter
Saeed	2	Simple Mafia
Parsa	3	Doctor
Mostafa	4	Sniper
Arvin	5	Armored
Shervin	6	Simple citizen
Mohammad Javad	7	Detective
Morteza	8	Negotiator
Pedram	9	Simple citizen
Raham	10	Mafia boss

Result: Mafia win

==== Season 3 (March–April 2020) ====
Participants in the final:

Participant	Number	Role
Omid	1	Reporter
Atabak	2	Detective
Hamid	3	Doctor
Mohammad Hossein	4	Simple citizen
Ali	5	Simple citizen
Sina	6	Negotiator
Hasan	7	Simple Mafia
Milad	8	Simple Mafia
Amir Hossein	9	Simple citizen
Mohammad Hossein	10	Mafia boss
Shahriar	11	Armored
Arash	12	Sniper

Result: Mafia win

Participants in the final (women):

Participant	Number	Role
Ghorban Nejad	1	Detective
Ahsani	2	Armored
Sorbi	3	Simple citizen
Ahmadi	4	Doctor
Amina	5	Reporter
Safaei	6	Negotiator
Hejazi	7	Mafia boss
Rezaei	8	Simple Mafia
Shirzadeh	9	Simple citizen
Soltanali Zadeh	10	Sniper
Shahbazi	11	Armored
Hasheminejad	12	Simple Mafia

Result: Mafia win

==== Season 4 (April–May 2020) ====
Participants in the final:

Participant	Number	Role
Sina	1	Armored
Ali	2	Doctor
Amin	3	Mafia boss
Pourya	4	Simple citizen
Mohammad	5	Simple citizen
Mobin	6	Negotiator
Mohammad Reza	7	Simple Mafia
Akbar	8	Reporter
Ali Akbar	9	Sniper
Hamid	10	Detective

Result: Citizen win

==== Season 5 (October–November 2020) ====
Participants in the final:

Participant	Number	Role
Mohammad Amin Sadeghi	1	Negotiator
Hamed Fekri	2	Doctor
Sina Enayati	3	Simple citizen
Morteza Radan	4	Armored
Soroush Sadeghi	5	Sniper
Mehdi Seyedi	6	Reporter
Sina Azizi	7	Simple Mafia
Bahman Zarei	8	Simple citizen
Amin Zahmati	9	Mafia boss
Sina Behnia	10	Detective

Result: Mafia win

==== Season 6 (November–December 2020) ====
Participants in the final:

Participant	Number	Role
Ali Akbar Mohammadi	1	Armored
Amir Khajavi	2	Reporter
Vahid Tehrani	3	Detective
Amir Hossein Dehghan	4	Doctor
Saeed Hosseini	5	Mafia boss
Mohammad Hossein Razavi	6	Simple citizen
Mohsen Gleej	7	Negotiator
Reza Hosseini	8	Simple citizen
Ehsan Ramezani	9	Simple Mafia
Behrad Hourfar	10	Sniper

Result: Citizen win

Eleventh finalist (Moral): Ali Heydari

==== Season 7 (December 2020–January 2021) ====
Participants in the final:

Participant	Number	Role
Yashar Khalili	1	Doctor
Hamid Reza Ashkil	2	Sniper
Ali Ghavami	3	Negotiator
Amir Mehdi Sohrabi	4	Mafia boss
Ramin Mortazi	5	Armored
Hamid Bani Assad	6	Simple citizen
Alireza Spanani	7	Detective
Iraj Nikjoo	8	Simple citizen
Hamid Reza Mohammadi	9	Simple Mafia
Amir Qashqai	10	Reporter

Result: Citizen win

==== Season 8 (January–March 2021) ====
Participants in the final:

Participant	Number	Role
Sina Moradi	1	Negotiator
Amir Mohammad Kakavand	2	Simple Mafia
Hamid Reza Pouryayi	3	Doctor
Iman Foroughi	4	Sniper
Arian Seddighi	5	Armored
Mehran Amirtaheri	6	Reporter
Afshin Zaer	7	Simple citizen
Amir Mohammad Safarzadeh	8	Simple citizen
Soheil Hejazi	9	Detective
Erfan Esmaeili	10	Mafia boss

Result: Citizen win

==== Season 9 (March–April 2021) ====
Participants in the final (women):

Participant	Number	Role
Shirin Matinfar	1	Reporter
Katayoun Ahmadi	2	Simple citizen
Atefeh Khaboushi	3	Mafia boss
Samira Jalalat	4	Negotiator
Aylar Ghanbarzadeh	5	Sniper
Yasaman Panahi	6	Doctor
Zahra Asadi	7	Detective
Ghazaleh Ghedyani	8	Armored
Mahsa Azari	9	Simple Mafia
Melania Shahbazian	10	Simple citizen

Result: Mafia win

== Awards and nominations ==
Year	Award	Category	Result
2021	FTDigital	The best TV show of the year	Won
2020	FTDigital	The best TV show of autumn 2020	Nominated
