= Little Hosna =

2016 Iranian cartoon television series

- Also known as: Hosna Koochooloo (Bachehaye-Koocheye-Aseman (Children of the Flower Building))
- Genre: Cartoon (animation)
- Directed by: Hossein Safarzadegan, Majid Mahmoudi
- Country of origin: Iran
- Original language: Persian
- No. of episodes: 91 episodes

Production
- Producer: Owj Arts and Media Organization
- Production locations: Tehran, Iran
- Running time: 14 minutes
- Production company: IRIB

Original release
- Network: IRIB Pooya & Nahal
- Release: 2016

Little Hosna (also known as Children of the Flower Building) is the name of an Iranian animation that was first broadcast on the Pouya channel in late 2016. This animation has 91 episodes, and the production project began in January 2015 and ended in August 2016. Children of the Flower Building is the second series by Sabyan Studio, in the form of animation and for young children.

Little Hosna is a collection of stories and events that happen to children living in a 4-story apartment building called Golha, which is an 8-unit family apartment building. The central role of this story is played by a little girl named Hosna, who lives in one of the units of this building with her parents and a goose, which she receives as a gift. Each time, they create an adventure with their neighbors that will ultimately lead to an educational point for the little ones.

== Story ==
A few happy and playful children live in the flower building with their families. They are neighbors with each other and play new games every day and learn a lot of new things with the help of their families.

Hosna is a little girl who lives in this building with her parents. Hosna's father gives her a goose as a gift on her birthday. Hosna and her goose play with the neighbor children every day and teach each other everything they learn.

== Little Hosna 2 ==
The second season of the animated series Little Hasana directed by Hossein Saffarzadegan has been released. This animation has been made available to children in 67 12-minute episodes.
