= Omid-e-Iran OITN =

Iranian television network in California, United States

Coordinates: 34.169401°N 118.576358°W

- Country: Worldwide
- Broadcast area: Worldwide
- Headquarters: 5530 Corbin Ave Unit 210 Tarzana, CA 91356

History
- Launched: 1995
- Founder: Nader Rafiee
- Former names: Omid-e Iran

Links
- Website: link

Omid-e-Iran OITN (English: Hope of Iran) is an American television network, inaugurated in 1995. The original mission was to broadcast television content and news to the Iranian American community of Southern California, however the scope broadened to the international Iranian community. The network was founded by Nader Rafiee, who started their journalist career on IRTV. In 2004, it set up an office in Dubai, closer to Iran, airing six hours of programming locally. The channel is free-to-air and financed by commercial advertising. Omid-e-Iran has programming in English and Persian languages.

== See also ==
- List of Persian-language television channels
