= Charkh =

2015 Iranian TV talk show

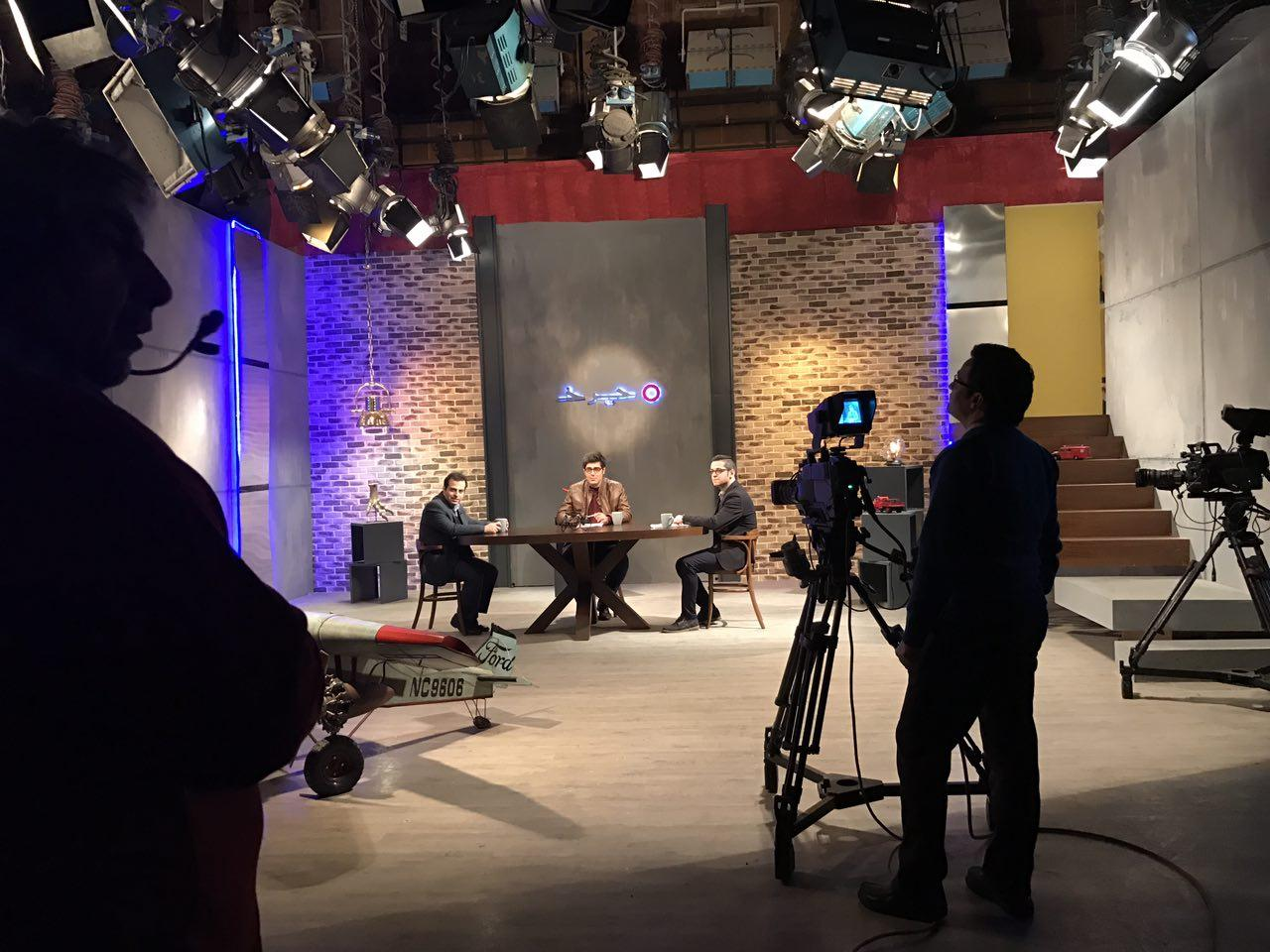
- A shot from behind the scene of Charkh TV program by Milad Nouri and Shahriar Rabbani
- چرخ
- Created by: Maryam Firoozi
- Starring: Shariar Rabbani, Milad Nouri, Iman B.Vakil as host
- Country of origin: Iran
- Original language: Persian
- No. of episodes: 200+

Production
- Executive producer: Mahdi Boroomand
- Running time: 50 minutes

Original release
- Network: Channel 4 (Iran)
- Release: September 2015

Charkh (Persian: چرخ lit. "Wheel") is an Iranian television talk show that has aired on IRIB TV4 since 2015. Each episode focuses on scientific topics and is approximately 75 minutes in length. The series airs every working day-night (six days a week).

== Theme ==
The show is aired live and nationwide every evening during the weekdays according to the Iranian calendar on Channel 4. Shariar Rabbani and Milad Nouri perform as presenters and the program in each episode hosts guest(s) from the Iranian scientific community in one of the following fields:

- Technology and engineering
- Medical science
- Fundamental science
- Cognitive sciences, philosophy, and history of science
- Environment and natural resources

The program is an interactive discussion between the host and the guest rather than a monologue stream and the discussion may be enriched with presentations, slide shows, movie clips, or graphics related to the subject. In Charkh it has been aimed to present an attractive science-based discussion using a live program with a language compatible with the appetite of Iranian youth.
