= Nima Shahrokh Shahi =

Iranian actor, writer, and director

- نیما شاهرخ‌شاهی
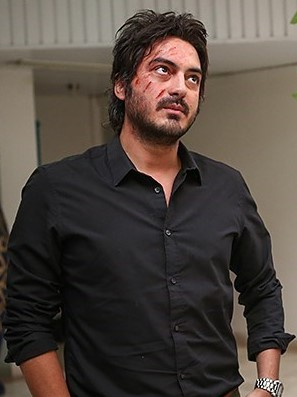
- behind the scenes of the movie and series "Mearajiha" 2022
- Born: August 8, 1981 (age 43); Tehran, Iran
- Occupation(s): Actor, writer, director
- Years active: 2005–present
- Website: www.nimashahrokhshahi.com

Nima Shahrokh Shahi (Persian: نیما شاهرخ‌شاهی) (born 8 August 1981) is an Iranian actor, writer and director. He studied civil engineering and has a sister who lives in Sweden.

== Career ==
He started his career in cinema and starred in Maxx by Saman Moghadam in 2005. His most notable activities are Faseleha series by Hossein Soheili Zadeh, Tambourine by Parisa Bakhtavar and Standardized Patient series by Saeed Agha Khani.

Nima Shahrokh Shahi has appeared in over 130 films, TV series, and home shows.

In recent years, he has attended Asghar Farhadi's advanced directing classes and recently made two short films, which have been released worldwide by the international company American Bright Light Movies. He is also making a feature film on topics related to schizophrenia and other similar psychiatric disorders.

== Filmography ==
=== As actor ===
Year	Film	English title	Role	Director
2005	Maxx	"Maxx"	Amir Ali	Saman Moghadam
2007	Parkway	"Parkway"	Koohyar	Fereydoun Jeyrani
2008	Dayere Zangi	"Dayere Zangi"	Khosro Abdollah Zadeh	Parisa Bakhtavar
2008	Majnoone leyli	"Majnoone leyli"	Mahmoud	Ghasem Jafari
2009	Keesh O Maat	"Checkmate"	Kamran	Jamshid Heidari
2010	Democracy Tou Rouze Roshan	"Democracy on light Day"	Andereh	Ali Atshani
2010	Payannameh	"Thesis"	Amir	Hamed Kolahdari
2010	Malakot	"Kingdom"	Saman	Mohammadreza Ahang
2010	Nasepas	"Ungrateful"	Ashel	Hassan Hedayat
2011	Aynehaye rooberoo	"Facing Mirrors"	Emad Tolooyi	Negar Azarbayjani
2011	Ekhrajiha 3	"Deportees 3"	Haj Saleh Girinouf's Son	Masoud Dehnamaki
2011	Moj-o Sakhreh	"Rock & Wave"	Payam	Majid Salehi
2012	Telephone Hamrah Reis Jomhour	"The President's Cell Phone"	Kia	Ali Atshani
2012	Girandeh	"Receiver "		Mehrdad Ghafarzadeh
2012	Shabake	"Shabake "	Pejman	Iraj Ghaderi
2012	Mard Noghrehei	"The Silver Man "	Danial	Kazem Maasoumi
2012	Bi Enteha	"Eternal "	Mahdi	Amir Hossein Jahddoust
2014	Merajiha	"Merajiha"	Ashkan	Masoud Dehnamaki
2014	Lamp 100	"Lamp 100"		Saeed Aghakhani
2014	Pashne Boland	"High-Heeled "		Ali Atshani
2015	Baj	"Baj "	Fariborz	Bahman Goodarzi
2015	Darbast	"Darbast"	Psychic boy	Ali Khameparast
2015	Bogzarid Mitra Bekhabad	"Bogzarid Mitra Bekhabad"	Ayoob	Arash Sanjabi
2017	Horam	"Horam "		Hosein Ganj Khani
2017	Kebrite Sookhte	"Kebrite Sookhte"	Maani	Kazem Ma'asoumi
2017	Man Va Sharmin	"Yasin"	Sharmin / Farid	Bizhan Shirmarz
2018	Eshghulance	"Guiti's Problem"	Sohrab	Mohsen Mahini
2018	Katyusha	"Katyusha"	Ehsan	Ali Atshani
2018	Dash Akol	"Dash Akol"	Nosrat	Mohammad Arab
2019	Takhte Gaz	"Top Gear"	Keyvan	Mohamad Ahangarani
2022	Parole			Masoud Dehnamaki

=== As director ===
Year	Film	Type
2020	Mercurochrome	Short
2020	Paradoxical	Short
