= Persian Toon =

TV channel in Persian language (2012–2015)

- Logo used from 21 March 2011 to 16 January 2015.
- Country: United Kingdom; Iran
- Broadcast area: Iran
- Headquarters: London, United Kingdom

Programming
- Languages: English, Persian

Ownership
- Owner: Kian Nabavi; Saeed Karimian

History
- Launched: 21 March 2011
- Closed: 16 January 2015

Persian Toon (Persian: پرشین تون) was a British-based Persian-language television channel featuring content for children and teenagers on the Eutelsat satellite platform (specifically Hot Bird 13A). It was the first channel specifically for children in the Persian language, airing in 2011. This channel became popular in Iran with dubbed Persian language musical cartoons. The dubbing was provided by many groups including Glory Entertainment. Persian Toon mainly broadcast animated American series and movies, such as SpongeBob SquarePants, Kung Fu Panda, Star Wars: The Clone Wars, Scooby Doo, Looney Tunes, and Teenage Mutant Ninja Turtles. The channel was added to the list of FTA channels available to Cyfrowy Polsat subscribers in September 2014.

In 2014, the channel's manager, Kian Nabovi, faced financial problems. Nabovi sold the business to Saeed Karimian (former manager of GEM TV Group) at the end of 2014. The channel was closed for unknown reasons around early 2015, broadcasting a test pattern in its place, however there were suspicions published in Iranian newspapers about the channel spreading "Western propaganda". Karimian was assassinated in Turkey in 2017, sometime after being sentenced in absentee court in Iran to a prison term for spreading propaganda against Iran.
