= Saeed Karimian =

Founder of GEM Group

Saeed Karimian Persian: سعید کریمیان
- Born: 8 August 1972; Qaen, Iran
- Died: 29 April 2017 (aged 44); Istanbul, Turkey
- Cause of death: Assassination
- Citizenship: Iranian; British
- Occupations: founder and chairman of Gem Televisions Network

Saeed Karimian (8 August 1972 – 29 April 2017) was an Iranian television executive, the founder, chairman, and owner of Dubai-based GEM TV, which runs 17 Persian-language TV channels, plus one each in Kurdish, Azeri, and Arabic. Karimian, who was British national, had been tried in absentia by a court in Tehran, and sentenced to a prison term of six years for spreading propaganda against Iran.

== Assassination of Saeed Karimian ==
Karimian was shot dead in Istanbul, Turkey, on 29 April 2017, along with his Kuwaiti business partner. According to the exiled Iranian opposition group National Council of Resistance, Karimian was assassinated by the Revolutionary Guard on the orders of Ayatollah Ali Khamenei, the country’s Supreme Leader. In May 2017, Turkish media reported that two people accused for the assassination of Karimian were arrested in Serbia with fake passports on their way to Iran.

== See also ==
- Persian Toon, Persian language TV channel from 2012 to 2015
