= Asemane shab =

Iranian television program

- Also known as: The Night Sky; Aseman-e-Shab
- Persian: آسمان شب
- Genre: Astronomy; Educational
- Created by: Siavash Safarianpour
- Written by: Pouria Nazemi
- Directed by: Siavash Safarianpour; Mohammad Fatemeh Safarianpour
- Presented by: Siavash Safarianpour; Pouria Nazemi; Hafez Ahi; Kazem Kokrom
- Country of origin: Iran
- Original language: Persian
- No. of episodes: 700+

Production
- News editor: Babak A. Tafreshi
- Production locations: Tehran, Iran
- Running time: 45 minutes
- Production company: Islamic Republic of Iran Broadcasting

Original release
- Network: IRIB TV4
- Release: 7 August 2001 – present

Asemane shab (Persian: آسمان شب, lit. 'The Night Sky') is an Iranian weekly science education television series. It is the only Iranian program specializing in astronomy and the longest-running scientific series in the history of Iranian television. It was created by Siavash Safarianpour, who also directs and presents the show. Other featured presenters include Pouria Nazemi, Hafez Ahi, and Kazem Kokrom.

The program has been produced for IRIB TV4 since early 2001. It began airing on 7 August 2001 and remains one of IRIB TV4's most highly viewed programs. An episode of the series airs every Friday at 11 PM.

== Format ==
The majority of the series is presented from a glass roundtable, made to resemble a disc atop a silver-coated moon or asteroid. Siavash Safarianpour acts as the host and main speaker. He maintains an air of seriousness but does put on an act, portraying himself as a knowledgeable, intensely curious character. He always holds a stack of papers and sits in an oversized swiveling chair with a large headboard. At the end of each episode, he gets up in front of a diagram of the Earth and summarizes the day's topics.

A newly added segment introduced in 2014 features amateur astronomers discussing the observation history of the Milky Way Galaxy and major ones around it, particularly the Andromeda Galaxy.

Much of the topics discussed are current astronomy-related events and phenomena, but there have been exceptions, such as a show dedicated to American astronomer Edwin Hubble and his achievements.

== Crew ==
- Siavash Safarianpour: creator, director, presenter (since 2001)
- Pouria Nazemi: writer, presenter (since 2001)
- Hafez Ahi: presenter (since 2011)
- Kazem Kokrom: presenter (since 2017)
- Babak A. Tafreshi: news editor and consultant (since 2007)

Since its inception, Siavash Safarianpour has acted as the creator, producer and director. He is an amateur astronomer who is recognized for his amateur astronomical photography. He started his career as a producer of TV and radio scientific programs in 1999. In 2008, he was selected to receive the Award of Scientific Accomplishments for his work on Asemane shab. Since then, he has also acted as a member of the Association of International Project of StarPeace.

== Production and broadcast ==
The origin of Asemane shab can be traced back to 1999, when Siavash Safarianpour began collaborating with the Islamic Republic of Iran Broadcasting. He joined the network to produce irregular one-episode programs covering astronomical phenomena such as eclipses.

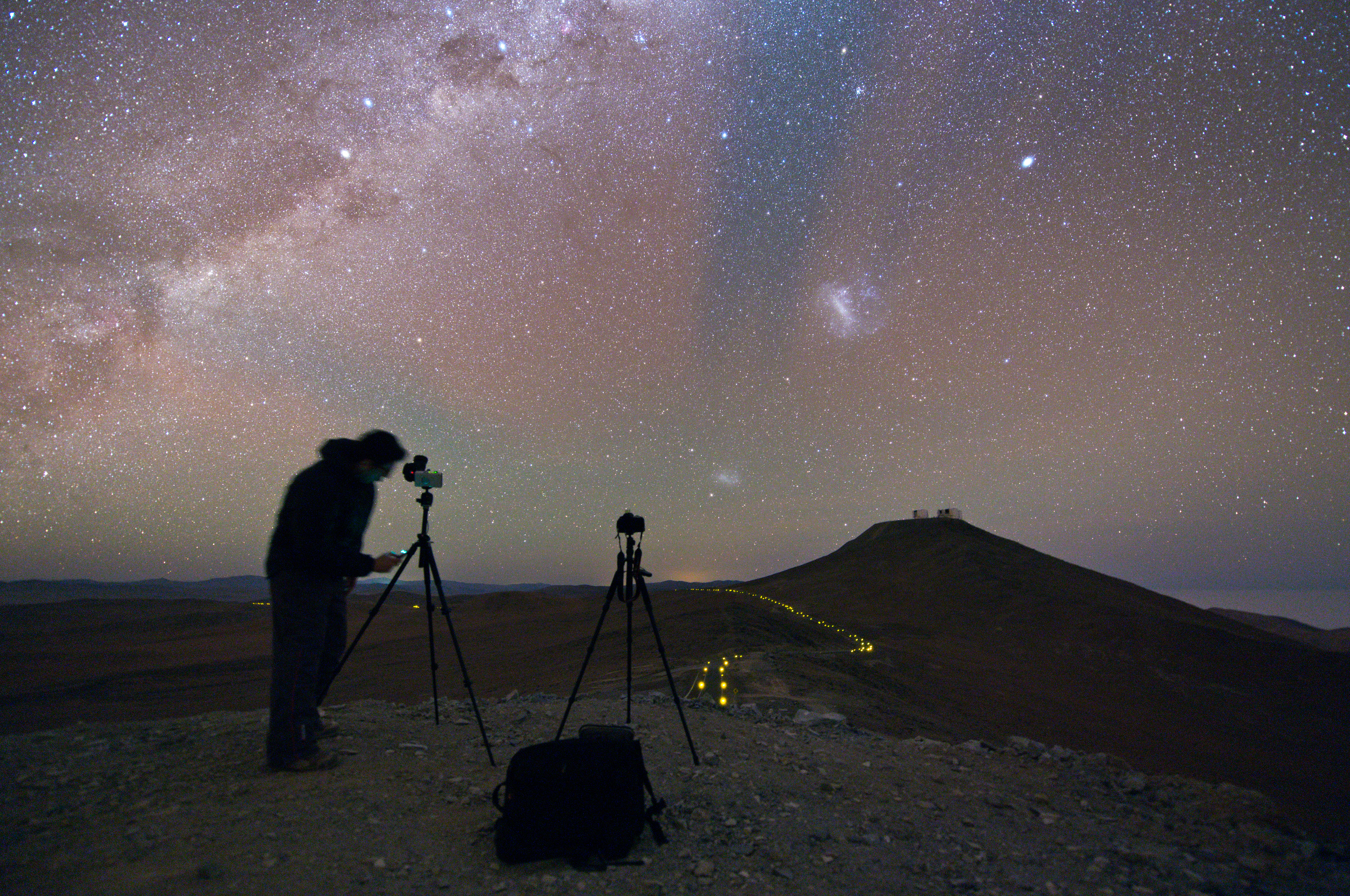
Asemane shab editor and consultant Babak Tafreshi filming.

The focus of Asemane shab's premiere episode was covering the International Day of Astronomy for the first time in Iran. The main goal that Safarianpour set for the program was to promote astronomy to the public in various formats based on the public interest; before Asemane shab, there had been no Iranian programs dedicated to the field of astronomy, and it was considered a relatively unpopular topic. An effort was made to communicate knowledge in easily-understood language, without sacrificing loyalty to the scientific concepts, so that the program could connect with both casual viewers and astronomy enthusiasts.

The first episode of the Asemane shab marked the beginning of the production of a regular, consistent, and dynamic program with a focus on topics in the field of astronomy. It has been broadcast each week since it first aired. It became the longest-running science television series in Iran when it aired its 500th episode aired on Yalda's Night 2007. It began a temporary hiatus on 20 March 2011, during which only reruns played, but it resumed production and later surpassed 700 episodes on 5 May 2017.

The program employs some mechanisms of news reporting shows, such as on-scene field reporters photographing the sky and current occurrences. Many of the segments and diagrams shown on the series were taken and created by the staff members themselves.
