= Hassan Joveireh =

Iranian actor

- حسن جویره
- Born: 20 October 1956; Isfahan, Persia
- Died: 14 May 2025 (aged 68)
- Citizenship: Iranian
- Occupation: Actor
- Years active: 1968–2025
- Notable work: Behind the Tall Mountains; Hasht Behesht

Hassan Joveireh (Persian: حسن جویره; 20 October 1956 – 14 May 2025) was an Iranian actor and voice actor.

== Biography ==
Hassan Joveireh, a prominent theater and television actor and voice actor, began his artistic career in 1966 by writing stories in elementary school. Two years later, in 1968, upon entering high school and joining the theater and music art group, he began acting under the supervision of Professor Saeed Zahrani. He has had more than five decades of artistic activity. He has played roles in various theatrical, cinematic, and television works, and has also been active in fields such as Writing, Makeup, set design, and directing.

Joveireh died on 14 May 2025, at the age of 68.

== Filmography ==
Hassan Joveireh has had a prolific career in both cinema and television. Below is a selection of his notable works:

- Golden Holiday (TV series) directed by Hadi Rahimi Khas
- The City I saw With You directed by Nima Javadi
- Goodbye Cinema directed by Yaser Ahmadi
- Wet Road Bend directed by Ehsan Soltanian
- Butterfly Dream directed by Majid Sedighi
- Jalbab directed by Majid Kashi Forooshan
- Maybe There directed by Milad Jarmooz
- The Shadow of Sultan (TV series) directed by Morteza Atashzamzam
- Hasht Behesht (TV series) directed by Saeed Alemzadeh
- The Silver Man (TV series) directed by Kazem Masoumi
- Behind the Tall Mountains (TV series) directed by Amrollah Ahmadjoo
