= Tehran: City of Love =

2019 Iranian comedy-drama film

- Film poster
- Directed by: Ali Jaberansari
- Written by: Ali Jaberansari; Maryam Najafi
- Produced by: Babak Jalali; Mohammad Ahmadi; Maryam Najafi; Marleen Slot
- Starring: Forough Ghajabagli; Mehdi Saki; Amir Hessam Bakhtiari; Behnaz Jafari
- Cinematography: Mohammad Reza; Jahanpanah
- Music by: Hamed Sabet
- Release date: October 2018 (London Film Festival)
- Running time: 102 minutes
- Country: Iran
- Language: Persian

Tehran: City of Love is a 2018 Iranian comedy-drama film, directed by Ali Jaberansari.

== Cast ==
- Mina – Forough Ghajabagli
- Vahid – Mehdi Saki
- Hessam – Amir Hessam Bakhtiari
- Niloufar – Behnaz Jafari

== Critical reception ==
The film received positive reviews, with praise going to the actors' performances (particularly Bakhtiari's). It was selected to be screened at the BFI London Film Festival 2018 and the International Film Festival Rotterdam 2019.
