= Deal or No Deal (Iranian game show) =

Iranian television game show

- Persian: تمام یا دوام
- Genre: Game show
- Based on: Deal or No Deal by John de Mol Jr.
- Presented by: Sina Valiollah
- Country of origin: United Arab Emirates
- No. of episodes: 42

Production
- Camera setup: Multiple-camera setup
- Running time: 30 minutes (with commercials)
- Production company: Endemol

Original release
- Network: FARSI1
- Release: 16 January – 27 April 2012

Tamam Ya Davam (Persian: تمام یا دوام) is the Iranian version of the television game show Deal or No Deal. It premiered on January 16, 2012 on FARSI1, hosted by Sina Valiollah, the Production Manager for FARSI1.

There are 20 briefcases containing prizes from US$1 to US$20,000.

This show is produced in Dubai, United Arab Emirates.

== Scheduling ==
From	To	Timeslot (IRST/IRDT)
January 16, 2012	January 18, 2012	Mon–Wed, 7:30–8:00 p.m.
January 25, 2012	February 15, 2012	Sat–Wed, 7:30–8:00 p.m.
February 23, 2012	March 16, 2012	Thu–Fri, 7:00–7:30 p.m.
March 20, 2012	March 28, 2012	Sat–Wed, 7:30–8:00 p.m.
April 5, 2012	April 27, 2012	Thu–Fri, 7:00–7:30 p.m.

== Case Values ==
Left Side	Right Side
$100	$1
$250	$2
$500	$5
$1,000	$10
$2,000	$15
$3,000	$20
$4,000	$30
$5,000	$40
$10,000	$50
$20,000	$75
