= Mehdi Saki =

Iranian actor and musician (b. 1974)

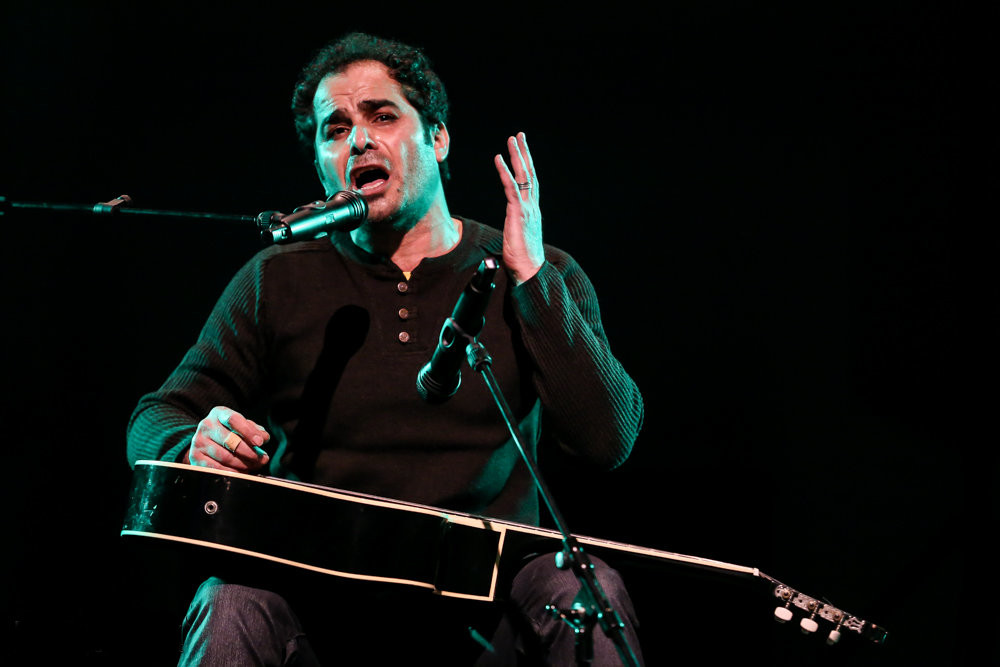
- Born: 1974; Khuzestan, Iran
- Occupation(s): Actor, composer, singer

Mehdi Saki (born 1974, Khuzestan) is an Iranian actor, composer, and singer.

== Filmography ==
=== Actor ===
Year	Title	Director
2002	Low Heights	Ebrahim Hatamikia
2004	Duel	Ahmad Reza Darvish
2012	About 111 Girls	Nahid Ghobadi
2012	Hasht Behesht (TV series)	Saeed Alemzadeh
2019	Tehran: City of Love	Ali Jaberansari

=== Composer ===
- 2016: Iran im Herzen

== Discography ==
- 2015: Kamakan
