= Parole (TV series) =

- آزادی مشروط
- Genre: Comedy
- Created by: Masoud Dehnamaki
- Written by: Karim Khodsiyani; Shahab Abbasi
- Directed by: Masoud Dehnamaki
- Starring: Alireza Ostadi; Soroush Jamshidy; Ali Mashhadi; Hossein Rafiee; Shahin Taslimi; Maryam Kavyani; Behnoosh Bakhtiari; Parviz Fallahipour; Mehran Rajabi; Nima Shahrokh Shahi; Ramin Rastaad
- Country of origin: Iran
- No. of seasons: 1
- No. of episodes: 52

Production
- Running time: 45 Minute

Original release
- Network: IRIB TV1
- Release: 1 November 2022

Parole (Persian: آزادی مشروط) is an Iranian television series written by Karim Khodsiani, Shahab Abbasi and directed and produced by Masoud Dehnamaki.

== Plot ==
The story of the series is about three prisoners. They are in prison because of the crime they have committed, but the arrival of Corona has made them experience conditional release and they can compensate a part of their sentence by serving.
