= Alireza Shoja Nouri =

Iranian actor and film producer

Alireza Shoja Nouri علی‌رضا شجاع‌نوری
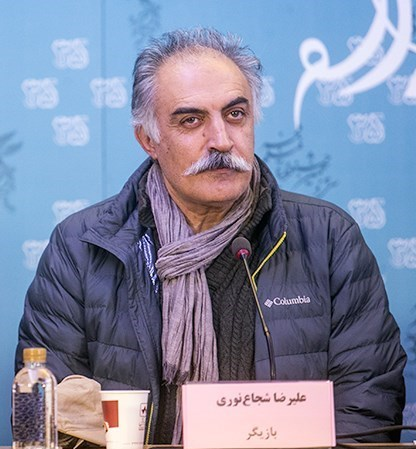
- Born: Alireza Shoja Nouri; 28 March 1955 (age 71); Shiraz, Iran
- Citizenship: Iranian
- Occupations: Producer, actor
- Years active: 1986

Alireza Shoja Nouri (Persian: علی‌رضا شجاع‌نوری) is an Iranian film producer and actor born on 28 March 1955 in Shiraz, Iran.

== Filmography ==
- Salman the Persian (TV series) (2026-)
- Negar (2017)
- Muhammad: The Messenger of God (2015)
- Behind the Tall Mountains (2012)
- A Little Kiss (2005)
- The Wind Carpet (2003)
- The Fateful Day (1994)
