= Islamic Republic of Iran News Network 2 =

IRINN 2
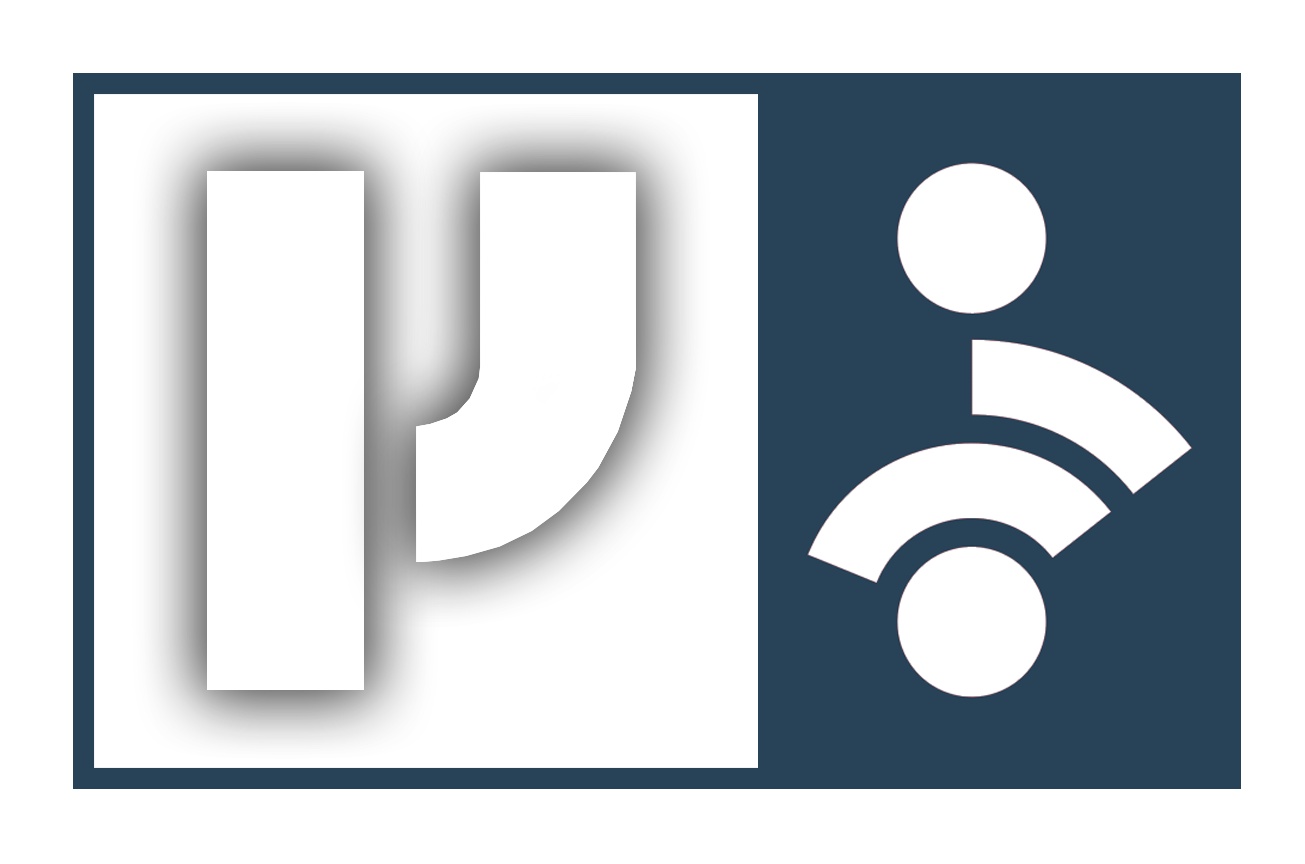
- Country: Iran
- Broadcast area: Asia and Europe
- Headquarters: Tehran

Programming
- Language: Persian
- Picture format: 16:9 (1080i, HDTV)

Ownership
- Owner: Islamic Republic of Iran Broadcasting

History
- Launched: 1 July 2023

Links
- Website: https://www.iribnews.ir

Availability

Terrestrial
- Jamaran Station (Tehran): CH37 UHF Digital (IRINN SD)
- Jamaran Station (Tehran): CH31 UHF Digital (IRINN HD HEVC)
- Jamaran Station (Tehran): CH34 UHF Digital (IRINN 2)

Streaming media
- IRINN Live Streaming
- IRINN2 Live Streaming

The Islamic Republic of Iran News Network 2 (IRINN 2) (Persian: شبکه خبر ۲ جمهوری اسلامی ایران) is an Iranian news channel that is part of Islamic Republic of Iran Broadcasting (IRIB) corporation, headquartered at the Jame Jam Park in Tehran, Iran. Live coverage of news events in Iran and around the world, including speeches by high-ranking Iranian and international officials, public sessions of the Islamic Consultative Assembly of Iran, and meetings of the United Nations Security Council, is the main mission of Islamic Repulic of Iran news network 2. The channel is the second branch of the main channel Islamic Republic of Iran News Network, which controls the channel's program.

== IRINN bombings ==
On 16 June 2025, the IRINN studio complex in Tehran was struck by an Israeli missile while broadcasting live. According to a live feed, a loud explosion was heard while the presenter Sahar Emami was on air, with the incident resulting in the death of two IRIB staff members, Nima Rajabpour, editor-in-chief of IRINN, and Masoumeh Azimi, secretary at IRIB.

The Israeli Defense Forces later confirmed they were responsible for the attack, claiming to target a secret Iranian military communication center. Israeli Prime Minister Benjamin Netanyahu and Defense Minister Israel Katz defended the strike, describing IRINN as a propaganda outlet.

The International Federation of Journalists condemned the Israeli strike, saying "under international law, journalists are civilians, and deliberate attacks against them constitute war crimes". The Committee to Protect Journalists also condemned the strike.
