= Salaam TV =

Shia Islamic television channel

Salaam TV (salaamtv)
- Country: United States
- Headquarters: Irvine, California

History
- Launched: February 12, 2005 (television)
- Founder: Mohammad Hedayati

Links
- Website: www.salaamtv.org

Salaam TV is an independent satellite television channel providing Shia Islamic programming. Salaam TV was established in early 2005 by Hajj Sheikh Mohammad Hedayati. The channel's launch date intentionally coincided with the Eid of Ghadeer. Salaam TV's producers assert that the channel is not affiliated with any political groups or external organizations, as it aims to provide apolitical Islamic programming.

== Availability ==
Salaam TV was originally available through satellite television throughout most of North America (specifically, the United States and Canada). Since its founding, Salaam TV has always been available internationally, as it is viewable free of charge through the official Salaam TV website. On May 22, 2006, Salaam TV became available via satellite programing in Europe and Iran through Hot Bird.

== Language ==
Throughout the first year of Salaam TV's programming, most of the channel's programs were in English and Persian (aside from the Qur'anic recitations, Islamic prayers, and supplications, which are always recited in Arabic). On January 14, 2006, Salaam TV founder Hajj Sheikh Mohammad Hedayati announced that the program would make efforts to increase programming in other languages including Arabic, Urdu, and Azari. Salaam TV's official website is available in Arabic, English, and Persian.

== Funding ==
There have been accusations that Salaam TV receives funding from political organizations and other countries, such as the Islamic Republic of Iran. Salaam TV's founders maintain that the channel's expenses are covered by individual philanthropists who donate money, primarily through telethon events. In 2005, Salaam TV held two telethons during which callers donated money to support the channel's programming.

== Music ==
None of Salaam TV's programming include music, as some Muslims maintain that music should not be played, especially in religious environments. Instead, the producers have opted to use sounds from nature, such as bird songs, during the interludes between regular programming.

== Satellite Information ==
- Intelsat Americas 5
- Satellite Name: Transponder 5 (T-5)
- Frequency: 11836
- Polarization: Vertical
- Symbol Rate: 20765
- FEC: 2/3
- SID: 60
- AID: 61

In Europe & Middle East:

- Satellite : Hot Bird
- Transponder : 153
- Frequency : 11566 horizontal
- Symbol rate : 27500
- FEC : 3/4

== Salaam TV Programming ==
- "Iman & Andishe" - a Persian-language program about Islam
- "In Touch with Qu'ran" - an instruction series which teaches the recitation of the Qur'an
- "Islam the First and Final Revelation" - discusses religions other than Islam for the purpose of comparative analysis
- "Qu'ran and Science" - discusses natural science as found in the Qur'an
- "Moderate Islam" - discusses how a Muslim should "Moderate" Islam with a question and answer discussion
- "Youth in Focus" - a youth program, which brings youth guests on the show, perform skits, and have bi-weekly game shows.
- Various broadcasts of Qur'anic recitations, Islamic prayers, and supplications
- Various syndicated programs dealing with Islamic topics
- The Clown and Farid Hossein - a little kid and a clown discuss Islamic matters
- Roots Game Show - a game show that is run by Noor Ismail and her cohost Abbas Ismail.
