= Azerbaijan TV =

West Azerbaijan; Iran
- City: Urmia
- Channels: Digital: 16:9 (576i, SDTV) 16:9 (1080p, HDTV)

Programming
- Language(s): Azerbaijani, Persian, Kurdish
- Affiliations: IRIB

Ownership
- Owner: Islamic Republic of Iran Broadcasting
- Sister stations: Sabalan TV

History
- First air date: 2000

Technical information
- Licensing authority: Ministry of Information and Communications Technology of Iran

Links
- Webcast: Sepehr; Telewebion
- Website: Official Website

Azerbaijan TV is a regional state run TV station affiliated to Islamic Republic of Iran Broadcasting. It covers mostly West Azerbaijan province of Iran.

== Sister channels ==
- Sahand TV
- Eshragh TV
- Sabalan TV
- Mahabad TV

== See also ==
- List of Persian-language television channels
- List of Azerbaijani-language television channels
