= IRIB Bazaar =

- Country: Iran
- Broadcast area: Worldwide
- Headquarters: Tehran

Programming
- Language: Persian
- Picture format: 16:9 (576i, SDTV)

Ownership
- Owner: Islamic Republic of Iran Broadcasting

History
- Launched: 20 November 2011
- Closed: 17 March 2016

Links
- Website: www.bazaartv.ir

Availability

Terrestrial
- Jamaran: CH43 UHF Digital

Streaming media
- IRIB Bazaar Live Streaming

IRIB Bazaar (Persian: شبکۀ بازار, Market channel, Shæbækeh-ye Bâzâr) was a national home shopping TV channel in Iran, launching on 20 November 2011 and was the third Iranian television channel to broadcast in digital mode. This channel was available in most provinces and could be received using set-top box devices or satellite televisions. The channel closed on 17 March 2016 and merged with IRIB TV5.

== Targets ==
This channel had 7 main purposes, such as:

- Economical news
- Educational programs about trading
- Advertisement

However it could not reach the targets and was one of the least successful channels in IRIB.

== See also ==
- Islamic Republic of Iran Broadcasting
