= Zemzemeh =

- Country: United Arab Emirates
- Broadcast area: Middle East; Afghanistan; Iran; GCC (inc.UAE); Tajikistan; Uzbekistan
- Network: Broadcast Middle East
- Headquarters: Dubai, United Arab Emirates

Programming
- Language: Persian
- Picture format: 4:3 (576i, SDTV)

Ownership
- Owner: MOBY Group; 21st Century Fox
- Sister channels: FARSI1

History
- Launched: July 2011 (stopped airing since 2012)

Zemzemeh (Persian: زمزمه) is a Persian TV channel, operated by Broadcast Middle East in Dubai, which is a joint venture between MOBY Group and 21st Century Fox.

Following the success of its sister channel FARSI1, Zemzemeh brings international comedies, dramas and romance to the screens of 100 million Persian speakers in the Middle East, Western Asia and Europe.

The channel has stopped (temporarily) since December 2012.

== Programs ==
name serial	Country
The Jewel Family	(South Korea)
The Betrayal	(Colombia)
A Matter of Respect	(Italy)
Aurora	(United States)
Elisa	(Italy)
Project Runway	(United States)
Gitanas	(Mexico)
The Queen of the South	(United States)
Coffee Prince	(South Korea)
Falling Angel	(United States)
Beauty Centre	(Italy)
