= Ali Limonadi =

Journalist and founder of IRTV

- علی لیمونادی
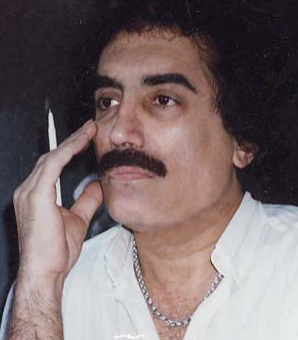
- Born: Tehran, Iran
- Education: Berlin University of the Arts
- Occupations: Film director, television producer, journalist
- Known for: IRTV

Ali Limonadi (Persian: علی لیمونادی) is an Iranian-born American film and television director, television producer, and journalist. He was the founder of IRTV (acronym for "Iranian television"; Persian:تلویزیون ایرانیان) in Los Angeles, the first television representation of the Iranian diaspora in the United States.

== Early life and career ==
Ali Limonadi was born in Tehran. After high school he moved to Germany. From 1962 until 1968, he studied film directing and cinematography at the Berlin University of the Arts (German: Universität der Künste Berlin). "Das Abonnement" is one of his films which was screened in 1967 on that time.

In 1979, months after the Iranian Revolution ended, Limonadi moved to the United States. He initially planned to stay for one year. In an interview Limonadi said: "At that time, we thought we would return to Iran after six months. We thought the situation would settle and that people could resume their lives back home. Some of us did not even fully unpack our bags."

== Post-1979 career ==
On March 15, 1981, Limonadi launched the first Iranian television station outside Iran named, IRTV (acronym for "Iranian television") shown on television channel KSCI. He had his own television broadcasting studio based in Studio City, Los Angeles, and he would periodically rent it out. He produced the television series, Iranian. Bootleg copies of his show Iranian were smuggled into Iran (via Europe) in the 1980s.

In 2007, Limonadi was getting thousands of virus-filled emails which he attributed to "Iranian government agents". Limonadi regularly appears on U.S.–based Iranian media such as Voice of America's Persian Television.

== Films ==
- Der Deutsche, 1966
- Das Abonnement, 1967

== Book ==
- One hundred years of struggle towards democracy in Iran (Ali Limonadi's interviews with politicians); Edited by Qasem Beykzadeh. Iranian Archive and Research Foundation, Los Angeles, 2013. (in Persian)

== See also ==
- List of Persian-language television channels
- Iranian Americans
