= Sabalan TV =

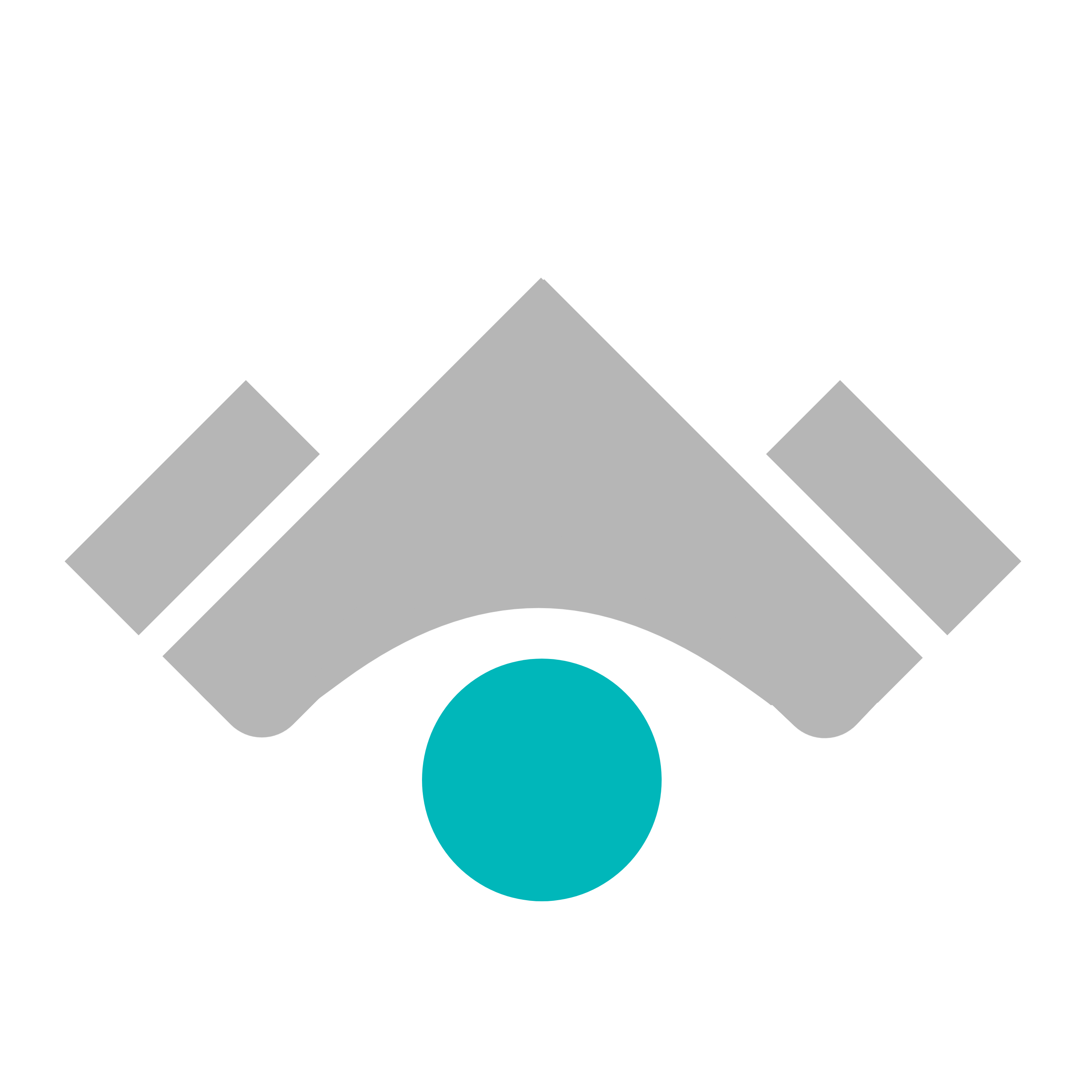

Ardabil Province; Iran
- City: Ardabil
- Channels: Digital: 16:9 (576i, SDTV) 16:9 (1080p, HDTV)

Programming
- Language(s): Azerbaijani, Persian
- Affiliations: IRIB

Ownership
- Owner: Islamic Republic of Iran Broadcasting
- Sister stations: West Azerbaijan TV

History
- First air date: 2000

Technical information
- Licensing authority: Ministry of Information and Communications Technology of Iran

Links
- Webcast: Telewebion; Sepehr
- Website: Official Website

Sabalan TV is an Iranian regional state run TV station affiliated to IRIB. It covers mostly Ardabil Province.

== Sister channels ==
- Sahand TV
- West Azerbaijan TV
- Eshragh TV
