= IRIB Omid =

Iranian TV channel

- Country: Iran
- Broadcast area: Iran, Middle East, United States, Turkey, Guyana
- Headquarters: Tehran

Programming
- Language(s): Persian
- Picture format: 16:9 (576i, SDTV) 16:9 (1080p, HDTV)

Ownership
- Owner: IRIB
- Sister channels: IRIB Pooya & IRIB Nahal

History
- Launched: September 20, 2016

Links
- Website: www.omidtv.ir

Availability

Terrestrial
- Alvand: CH34 UHF Digital

Streaming media
- IRIB Omid Live Streaming

IRIB Omid, the teen channel, which is a separate channel operated by IRIB and titled Omid (means hope), launched on September 20, 2016.

== History ==
On May 20, 1401, Mohsen Barmahani appointed the deputy of IRIB Mohammad Sadegh Bateni to the position of manager of IRIB Omid.
