= Farsi1 =

Farsi-language satellite television channel based in Dubai

- Country: (United Arab Emirates) UAE
- Broadcast area: Iran; Afghanistan; Tajikistan
- Network: Broadcast Middle East
- Headquarters: United Arab Emirates

Programming
- Language: Persian
- Picture format: 16:9, 4:3 (576i, SDTV) (1080p, HD)

Ownership
- Owner: (United Arab Emirates) MOBY Group
- Sister channels: Zemzemeh

History
- Launched: 1 August 2009; 17 years ago
- Closed: 31 December 2016

Links
- Website: www.farsi1.tv

Farsi1 (Persian: فارسی ۱) was the first international free-to-air Persian language general entertainment channel based in Dubai, United Arab Emirates.

Farsi1 was owned by 21st Century Fox and was operated by Broadcast Middle East, a MOBY Group company.

The channel was managed by Sina Valiollah, who used to be a host and producer years back in Iran.

From 8 June 2013, Farsi1 was renewed with new (mostly American) shows (like Modern Family & White Collar) subtitled in Farsi and from September 2014, Farsi1 was also airing Turkish TV series, like Adini Feriha Koydum, Seyit & Sura and Valley of the Wolves Dubbed in Farsi.

In April 2014, the network announced that they would only be available through Yahsat and would be leaving Hotbird, which led to many angry fans outside of Iran. Farsi1 neglected the fans in Europe with this decision.

The channel closed on 31 December 2016.

== Last programming ==
=== Dramas ===
No.	Name	Country	Original Broadcast	No. of episodes	Running time	Launched	Date	IRST
1	Vanished	United States	Fox (2006)	13	43 minutes	2015	Thursdays	22:00–23:00
2	Shark	United States	CBS (2008)	38	45 minutes		Wednesday	22:00–23:00
3	Kurt Seyit ve Şura	Turkey	Star TV (2014)	21	40 to 50 minutes	2015	Saturday to Wednesday	21:00 - 22:00
4	Medcezir	Turkey	Star TV(2014)	55	40 to 50 minutes	2014	Saturday to Wednesday	Coming Soon
5	Emir'in Yolu	Turkey	Show TV (2011)	67	40 to 50 minutes	2014	Saturday to Wednesday	20:00 - 21:00
6	Ice Adonis	South Korea	MBC Korea (2012)	108	40 to 50 minutes	2014	Saturday to Wednesday	19:00 - 20:00
7	Karagul	Turkey	FOX (2013)	66	40 to 50 minutes	April 2015	Saturday to Wednesday	20:00 - 21:00

=== Talk Shows ===
No.	Name	Country	Original channel	No. of episodes	Running time	Launched	Date	IRST
1	Chandshanbe ba Sina	Dubai	FARSI1 Production	38 (Season 1)	50 to 55 minutes		Friday	22:00–23:00

=== Game show ===
No.	Name	Running time	Launched	Date	IRST
1	Deal or No Deal (Persian: تمام یا دوام)	30 minutes	16 Jan 2012	Thursday & Friday	19:00–19:30

== Previous programming ==
No.	Name	Country	Original channel	No. of episodes	Running time	Launched	Ended
1	Couple or Trouble	South Korea	MBC (2006)	16	60 minutes	1 Aug 2009	26 Aug 2009
2	My Lovely Sam Soon	South Korea	MBC (2005)	20	60 minutes	?	?
3	The Bold and the Beautiful	United States	CBS (1987)	Up to 98	30 minutes	1 Aug 2009	6 Oct 2009
4	Night After Night	South Korea	MBC (2008)	17	60 minutes	27 Sep 2009	29 Oct 2009
5	Phoenix	South Korea	MBC (2004)	40	60 minutes	10 Oct 2009	2 Dec 2009
6	Picket Fences	United States	CBS (1992)	Up to 19	42 minutes	24 Sep 2009	4 Feb 2010
7	& Munoz	Colombia	Caracol TV	45	45 minutes	5 Dec 2009	10 Feb 2010
8	My Beloved Sister	South Korea	MBC (2006)	75	60 minutes	31 Oct 2009	10 Feb 2010
9	Small Wonder	United States	Syndication (1985)	Up to 54	23 minutes	6 Aug 2009	4 Mar 2010
10	Victoria	Colombia; United States	Telemundo (2007)	171	45 minutes	1 Aug 2009	24 Mar 2010
11	Fashion House	United States	MyNetworkTV (2006)	62+12	45 minutes	6 Aug 2009	13 May 2010
12	Queen of Housewives	South Korea	MBC (2009)	20	60 minutes	11 Feb 2010	4 Jun 2010
13	Miss Mermaid	South Korea	MBC (2002)	256 (2 episodes a day)	60 minutes	13 Feb 2010	8 Sep 2010
14	Second Chance	United States	Telemundo (2005)	143	60 minutes	27 Mar 2010	29 Sep 2010
15	Looking For Dad	Argentina; United States	Telemundo (2005)	121	42 minutes	24 Apr 2010	13 Oct 2010
16	How I Met Your Mother	United States	CBS (2005)	Up to 88	21 minutes	6 Aug 2009	12 Nov 2010
17	Vecinos	Colombia	Caracol TV (2008)	184	60 minutes	13 Feb 2010	30 Nov 2010
18	Assorted Gems	South Korea	MBC (2009)	64	60 minutes	10 Jun 2010	31 Dec 2010
19	White Lie	South Korea	MBC (2008)	100	60 minutes	11 Sep 2010	26 Jan 2011
20	Prison Break	United States	Fox (2005)	81	43 minutes	20 May 2010	25 Feb 2011
21	Marry Me	South Korea	MBC (2004)	24	60 minutes	6 Jan 2011	25 Mar 2011
22	Where is Elisa?	United States	Telemundo (2010)	100	43 minutes	4 Dec 2010	20 Apr 2011
23	Beautiful But Unlucky	Colombia; United States	Telemundo (2010)	140	40 minutes	16 Oct 2010	27 Apr 2011
24	The Mask of Analia	United States	Telemundo (2008)	176	42 minutes	2 Oct 2010	4 Jun 2011
25	Stay by My Side	South Korea	MBC (2007)	100	60 minutes	29 Jan 2011	15 Jun 2011
26	Still, Marry Me	South Korea	MBC (2010)	21	70 minutes	31 Mar 2011	10 Jun 2011
27	Eva Luna	United States	Univision & Venevision (2011)	114	45 minutes	30 Apr 2011	11 Oct 2011
28	El Clon	United States	Telemundo (2010)	184	45 minutes	23 Apr 2011	3 Jan 2012
29	Teresa	Mexico	Televisa (2010)	152	45 minutes	12 Oct 2011	5 May 2012
30	24	United States	Fox (2001)	192	43 minutes	25 Sep 2009	29 Jul 2011
31	Dharma & Greg	United States	ABC (1997)	119	22 minutes	6 Aug 2009	12 Nov 2010
32	Reba	United States	WB (2001)	126	30 minutes	6 Aug 2009	17 Dec 2010
33	Cartel	Colombia	Caracol TV (2008)	105	45 minutes	3 Mar 2011	-
34	Que Sera Sera	South Korea	MBC (2007)	24	50 minutes	16 Jun 2011	26 Aug 2011
35	Golden Fish	South Korea	MBC (2010)	95	60 minutes	18 Jun 2011	26 Oct 2011
36	Angel’s Temptation	South Korea	MBC (2009)	28	50 minutes	10 Oct 2011	10 Feb 2012
37	Cruel Temptation	South Korea	MBC (2008)	95	60 minutes	29 Oct 2011	7 Mar 2012
38	Living With Fran	United States	WB (2005)	26	30 minutes	-	-
39	Antimafia Squad	Italy	Canale 5 (2009)	48	60 minutes	-	-
40	R.I.S. Crime Evidence	Italy	Canale 5 (2005)	12	60 minutes	-	-
41	The Secrets of Eden	Greece	Mega Channel (2008)	300	45 minutes	5 Jun 2011	28 Jul 2012
42	The Power of Destiny	Mexico	Televisa (2011)	102	45 minutes	10 Mar 2012	29 Jul 2012
43	Behind Closed Doors	United States	Telemundo (2011)	165	45 minutes	4 Jan 2012	21 Aug 2012
44	Malcolm in the Middle	United States	Fox (2000)	151	23 minutes	19 Nov 2010	2 Aug 2012
45	Rebel Land	Italy	Rai 1 (2010)	7	100 minutes	29 Jun 2012	10 Aug 2012
46	The Betrayal	Colombia; United States	Telemundo (2008)	107	45 minutes	5 May 2012	30 Sep 2012
47	Love & Fear	Colombia	Caracol TV (2011)	90	45 minutes	30 Jul 2012	10 Mar 2013
48	Valley of Wolves	Turkey	Show time-Canal D (2003)	97	40 to 50 minutes	March 2014	January 2015
49	Adini Feriha Koydum	Turkey	Show TV (2011)	67	40 to 50 minutes	September 2014	April 2015
