= IRIB Tamasha =

Iranian TV channel

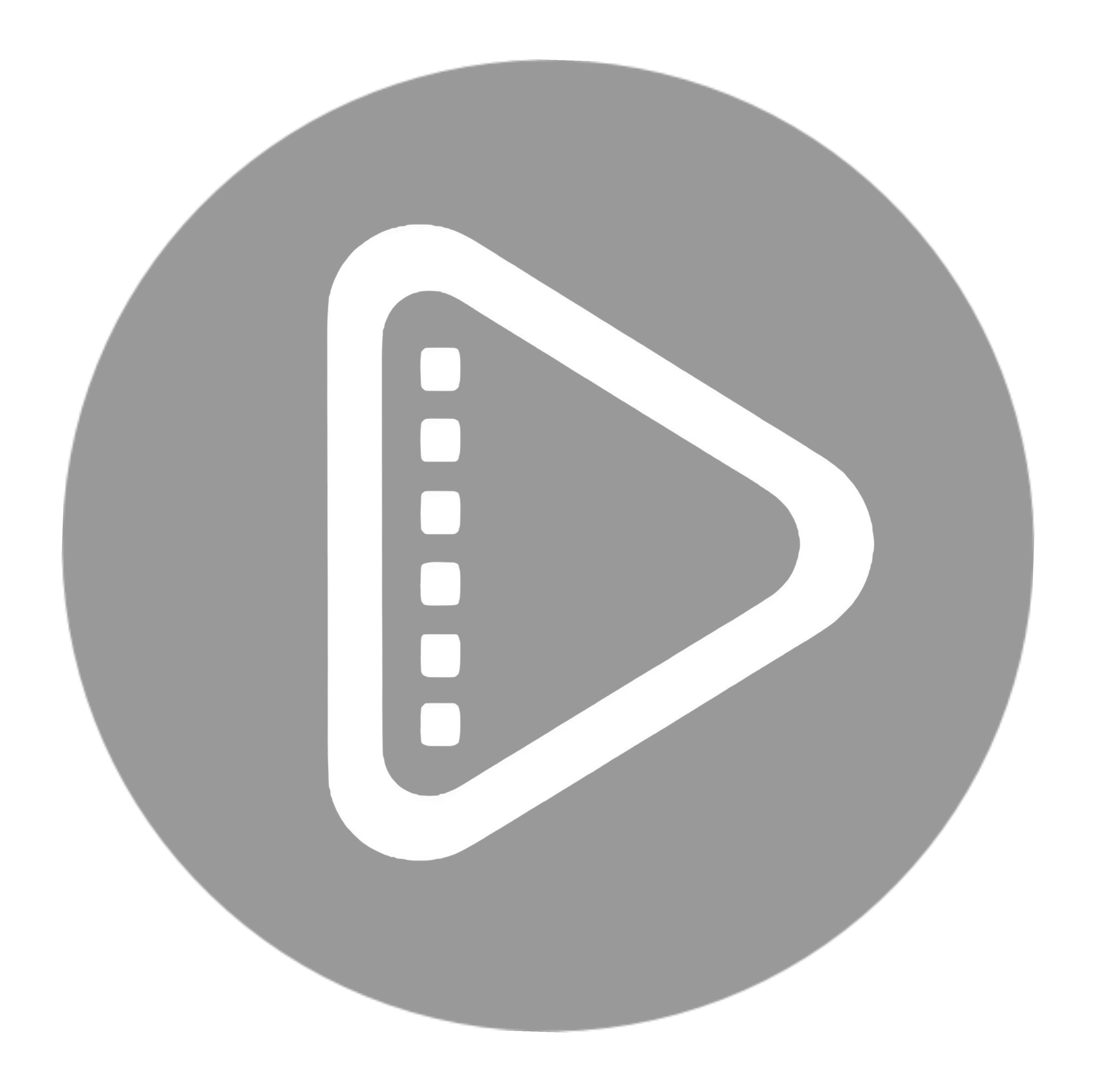
- Country: Iran
- Broadcast area: Asia; Guyana
- Headquarters: Tehran

Programming
- Language: Persian
- Picture format: 16:9 (576i, SDTV) 16:9 (1080p, HDTV)

Ownership
- Owner: Islamic Republic of Iran Broadcasting

History
- Launched: 13 February 2013 (Reopened 10 August 2016)
- Closed: 17 December 2014 (temporary)

Availability

Terrestrial
- Jamaran: Ch43 UHF Digital

IRIB Tamasha (Persian: شبکه‌ی تماشا, Shibkâhi-ye Temasha; English: View channel) has been a national TV channel in Iran. It was launched on 13 February 2013 and re-aired various TV series previously aired on IRIB, until 17 December 2014 that the channel was closed and merged into Namayesh. But later, after IRIB TV5 became provincial again on 10 August 2016, Tamasha was reformed, replacing the earlier-launched Tehran TV.

== Series ==
- Alarm für Cobra 11 – Die Autobahnpolizei
- Sherlock
- Old Way
- Sherlock Holmes (1984 TV series)
- Carousel
- The Enigma of Shah
- Prophet Joseph
- Jumong

== Logos ==
13 February 2013 – 17 December 2014
