= IRIB Namayesh =

- Country: Iran
- Broadcast area: Asia and USA
- Headquarters: Tehran

Programming
- Language: Persian
- Picture format: 16:9 (576i, SDTV) 16:9 (1080p, HDTV)

Ownership
- Owner: Islamic Republic of Iran Broadcasting

History
- Launched: 25 January 2012

Links
- Website: www.namayeshtv.ir

Availability

Terrestrial
- Jamaran: CH43 UHF Digital

Streaming media
- IRIB Namayesh Live Streaming

IRIB Namayesh (Persian: شبکۀ نمایش, Shæbækeh-ye Næmâyesh, "Show channel") is a national film and TV series TV channel in Iran launched on 25 January 2012 and is the fourth Iranian television channel to broadcast in digital mode. It is currently available in most provinces in Iran using digital Set-top boxes. Its sister channel is Tamasha TV, which merged with Namayesh TV at December 2014 but then relaunched on 10 August 2016.

== Popular programs ==
- Frank Riva
- Pasta
- Faith
- Kimchi Family
- Gyebaek
- Hong Gil-dong
- Brain
- Dream of the Emperor

== See also ==
- Islamic Republic of Iran Broadcasting
