= IRIB Iran Kala =

- Country: Iran
- Broadcast area: Worldwide
- Headquarters: Tehran

Programming
- Language: Persian
- Picture format: 16:9 (576i, SDTV) 16:9 (1080p, HDTV)

Ownership
- Owner: Islamic Republic of Iran Broadcasting

History
- Launched: 3 March 2018
- Closed: 27 July 2022

Links
- Website: www.iktv.ir

Availability

Terrestrial
- Alvand: CH34 UHF Digital

Streaming media
- IRIB Iran Kala Live Streaming

IRIB Iran Kala (Persian: شبکه‌ ایران‌کالا, Iran goods channel) was a national TV channel in Iran which was launched on 3 March 2018. This channel was available in most provinces and could be received using Set-top box devices, or Satellite televisions. It stopped broadcasting on 27 July 2022.

== Targets ==
This channel had 7 main purposes, including the following:

- Introducing stuffs
- Economical news
- Selling stuffs directly
- Educational programs about trading
- Advertisement

== See also ==
- Islamic Republic of Iran Broadcasting
