= IRIB Salamat =

- Country: Iran
- Broadcast area: Asia and Guyana
- Headquarters: Tehran

Programming
- Language: Persian
- Picture format: 16:9 (576i, SDTV) 16:9 (1080p, HDTV)

Ownership
- Owner: IRIB

History
- Launched: 26 September 2012

Links
- Website: salamattv.irib.ir

Availability

Terrestrial
- Jamaran: CH37 UHF Digital

Streaming media
- IRIB Salamat Live Streaming

IRIB Salamat (شبكه‌ سلامت, Shibkâhey-e Salâmit, "Health Channel"), is an Islamic Republic of Iran Broadcasting television channel, broadcast in worldwide.

The channel is one of the newer television channels in Iran and was established on 26 September 2012. The channel's 24-hour-a-day broadcast includes Health Programs.
