= GEM TV =

Iranian satellite TV channels

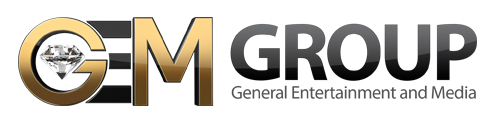
- Country: Iran
- Broadcast area: Europe, Middle East, Central Asia, North Africa
- Headquarters: Istanbul, Turkey

Programming
- Languages: Persian, Azeri, Kurdish, Arabic
- Picture format: 1080p (HDTV) & 576i (SDTV), 16:9

Ownership
- Owner: Saeed Karimian

History
- Launched: 2006

Links
- Website: www.gemonline.tv

GEM TV

GEM TV (Persian: جم تی‌وی) is an Iranian group of entertainment satellite channels. Its headquarters is located in Istanbul, Turkey. This group also launched various channels in Arabic, Kurdish and Persian to expand its viewers.

== History ==
GEM Television commenced work in 2006, owned and managed by GEM Group ("General Entertainment and Media Group"). GEM Group was established in 2001.

== Current programs ==
GEM's current programming consists of movies, documentaries and acquired programs and shows like America's Got Talent and The X Factor. GEM also airs dubbed Turkish TV series such as Magnificent Century, Kuzey Güney, Fatmagül'ün Suçu Ne? and Merhamet. All of the programs are either dubbed or subtitled in Persian.

== Assassination of Saeed Karimian ==
On 29 April 2017, Director of the GEM Group, Saeed Karimian, was assassinated in Istanbul.
