= IRIB TV4 =

Iran TV channel 4

- Country: Iran
- Broadcast area: Asia
- Headquarters: Tehran

Programming
- Language: Persian
- Picture format: 16:9 (576i, SDTV) 16:9 (1080p, HDTV)

Ownership
- Owner: IRIB

History
- Launched: 12 April 1994

Links
- Website: www.tv4.ir

IRIB TV4 (Persian: شبكه چهار, romanized: Shabakeh-ye Chahaar, lit. 'Channel Four') is one of the 32 national television channels in Iran. Its slogan is "the channel of wisdom."

The channel is operated by IRIB and started broadcasting in April 1994, shortly after IRIB TV3 went on air in December 1993. The channel is known to be a more artistic and academic channel than its counterparts. It broadcasts documentaries, academic conferences, interviews with scholars, artistic movies, economic magazines, plays, and philosophical discussions.

Gholamreza Gholami is the current manager of the channel.

== Original programming ==
- Asemaneshab (The Night Sky)
- Avay-e Irani (Iranian Music)
- Cinema 4
- Partove Danesh (The Rays of Wisdom)
- Do Ghadam Mande be Sobh (2 Steps To Morning) 2007
- Cinema Eghtebas
- Cinema Mavara (Paranormal Cinema)
- Mostanade 4 (Documentary 4)
- Sahbaye Tasnim
- Ordibehesht
- Ertebate Irani (2009)
- Char Soogh
- Charkh (Wheel)
- Tolou (Sunrise)
- Charsooye Elm (Screw of Science)
- Marefat (Doctrine)
- Yek Film Yek Tajrobe (1 Movie 1 Experience)
- Forje (Fast)
- Parto (Rays)

== Broadcast ==
- Primeval (TV series) (2009)
- Alfred Hitchcock Presents (2013)
- Little Dorrit (TV series) (2020)
- Zoo (TV series) (2021)
- Agatha Christie's Poirot (2021)
- Sherlock Holmes (1984 TV series) (2021)
- Sherlock (TV series) (2021)
- Severance (TV series) (2023)
