= IRIB Quran =

Iranian religious TV channel

- Country: Iran
- Broadcast area: Asia; Guyana
- Headquarters: Tehran

Programming
- Language: Persian
- Picture format: 16:9 (576i, SDTV) 16:9 (1080p, HDTV)

Ownership
- Owner: IRIB

History
- Launched: 11 December 2000

Links
- Website: www.qurantv.ir

Availability

Terrestrial
- Jamaran: CH44 UHF Analog
- Jamaran: Ch31 UHF Mobile
- Jamaran: CH37 UHF Digital

Streaming media
- IRIB Quran Live Streaming

IRIB Quran (شبكه’ قرآن, Shibkâh-e' Qârân in Persian), is an Islamic Republic of Iran Broadcasting television channel, broadcast in worldwide.

The channel is one of the television channels in Iran and was established on 11 December 2000. The channel is about life, religion and Quran.

== History ==
On 27 December 2020, IRIB Quran announced that they will organise a Quran reciting session in the shrine of Hazrat Zeinab in Damascus on 2 January 2021.

On 27 January 2022, the channel was hacked, along with several other IRIB channels, for "10 seconds".
