= IRIB Shoma =

Iranian TV channel

- Country: Iran
- Broadcast area: Asia and USA
- Headquarters: Tehran

Programming
- Languages: Persian, Kurdish
- Picture format: 16:9 (576i, SDTV)

Ownership
- Owner: Islamic Republic of Iran Broadcasting

History
- Launched: 30 July 2011 (Reopening: 20 September 2016)
- Closed: 27 July 2022

Links
- Website: www.shomatv.ir

Availability

Terrestrial
- Jamaran: CH43 UHF Digital

Streaming media
- IRIB Shoma Live Streaming

IRIB Shoma (Persian: شبکه‌ی شما, romanized: Shabake-ye Shomâ, lit. 'Your Channel') was a national ethnicity culture TV channel in Iran which was launched on July 30, 2011 and was the second Iranian television channel to broadcast in digital mode. This channel was available in most provinces, which could be received using Set-top box devices and satellite televisions. This channel shut down on March 17, 2016 by merging in IRIB Amoozesh, but relaunched on September 20, 2016. Due to synergistic policies, this channel - alongside the channel IRIB Iran Kala - were discontinued on July 27, 2022, with their signals shutting down at a later date.

== Logos ==
30 July 2011 - 13 December 2015

13 December 2015 - 23 February 2021

23 February 2021 - 27 July 2022

== See also ==
- Islamic Republic of Iran Broadcasting
