= IRIB Pooya & Nahal =

Iranian public TV channel

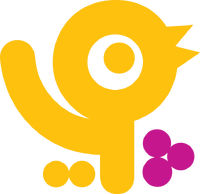

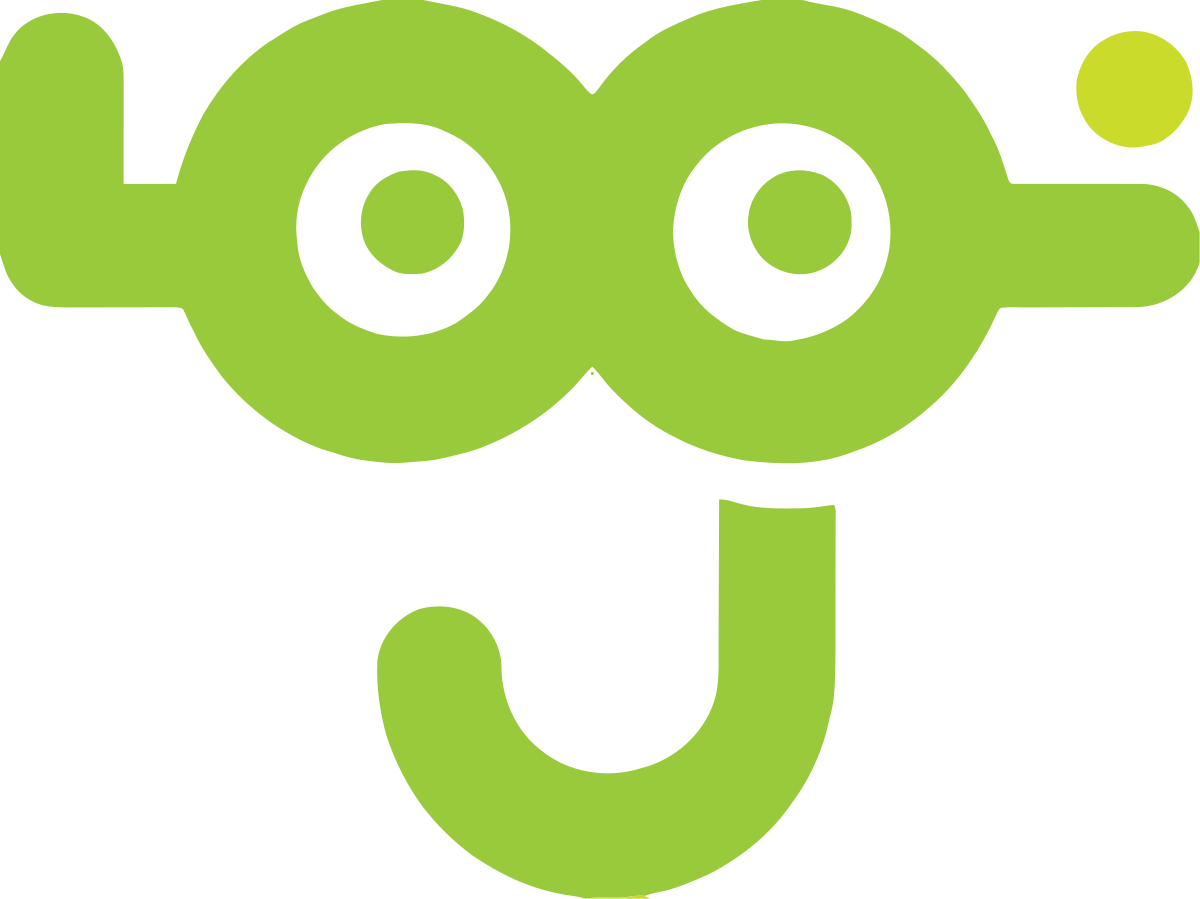
- Country: Iran
- Broadcast area: Worldwide
- Headquarters: Tehran

Programming
- Language: Persian
- Picture format: 16:9 (576i, SDTV) 16:9 (1080p, HDTV)

Ownership
- Owner: IRIB

History
- Launched: 18 July 2012 (IRIB Pooya); 23 September 2015 (IRIB Pooya & Nahal)

Links
- Website: www.pooyatv.ir www.nahaltv.ir

Availability

Terrestrial
- Jamaran: CH43 UHF Digital

Streaming media
- IRIB Pooya & Nahal Live Streaming

IRIB Pooya & Nahal (Persian: شبکۀ کودک و نوجوان, romanized: Shæbækeh-ye Kûdæk-o Nowjævân) is an Iranian state-owned children's Television channel owned by the Islamic Republic of Iran Broadcasting.

== History of the Channel ==
The channel was established on 18 July 2012, as Pooya TV, and reformed on 23 September 2015.

The channel consists of two subchannels, Pooya, launched on 23 September 2015, which is broadcast daily from 8 a.m. to 2 p.m., targets a younger audience, mainly consisting of six years and below. Nahal (which means Sapling in Persian), launched on 23 September 2015, as IRIB Koodak, but renamed and rebranded on 18 April 2016, broadcast everyday from 7.30 p.m., primarily targets older children. On 20 September 2016, Omid (meaning hope), a sister television channel targeted towards adolescents, was launched.

== Gallery ==
2012–2015

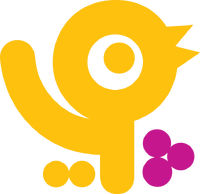
2015–present

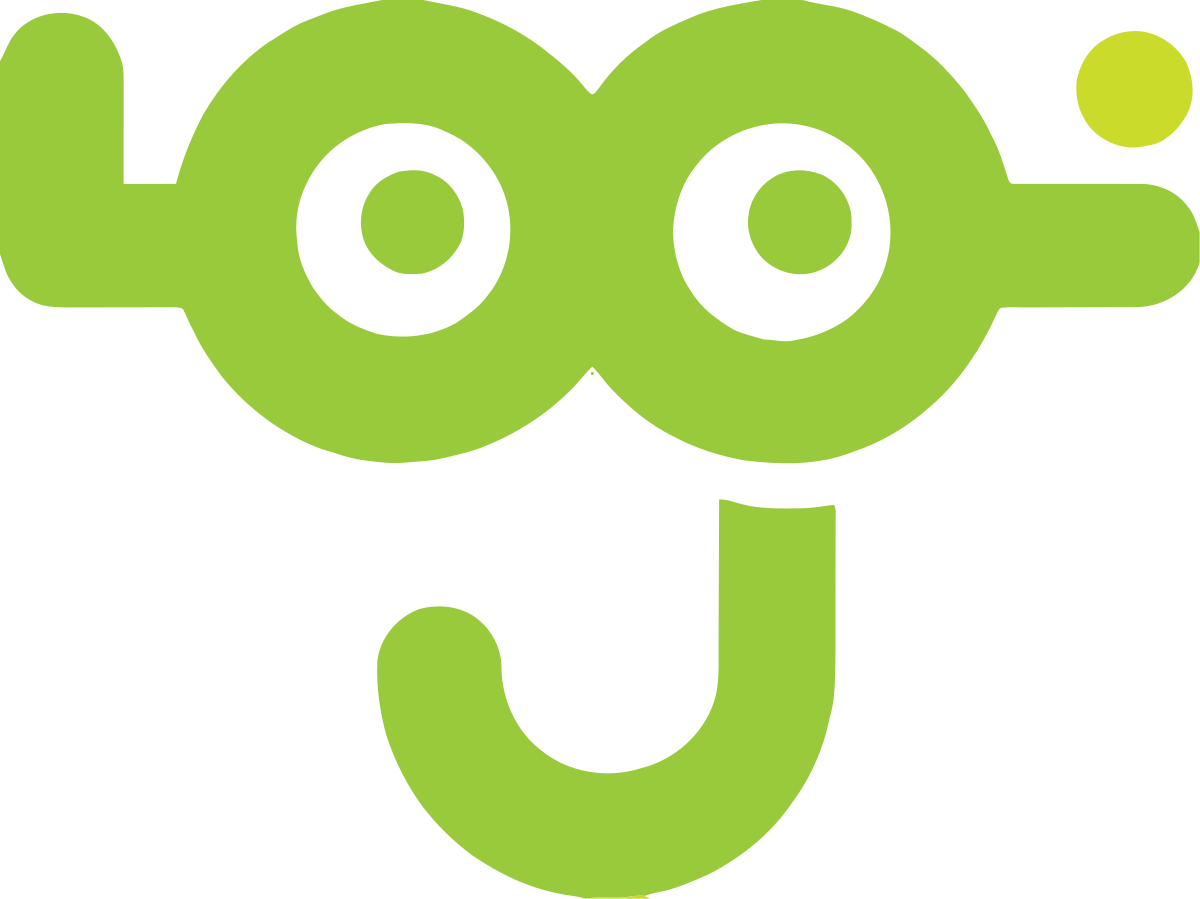
2015–present
