= IRIB Amoozesh =

Iranian TV channel

- Country: Iran
- Broadcast area: Asia; Guyana
- Headquarters: Tehran

Programming
- Language: Persian
- Picture format: 16:9 (576i, SDTV) 16:9 (1080p, HDTV)

Ownership
- Owner: IRIB

History
- Launched: 15 October 2002

Links
- Website: www.tv7.ir

Availability

Terrestrial
- Jamaran: CH49 UHF Analog
- Jamaran: CH31 UHF Mobile
- Jamaran: Ch37 UHF Digital

Streaming media
- IRIB Amoozesh Live Streaming

IRIB Amoozesh (Persian: شبكه’ آموزش, romanized: Shibkâh-e Âmuzesh, lit. 'The Education Channel'), is an Islamic Republic of Iran Broadcasting television channel, broadcast Worldwide.

The channel is one of the newer television channels in Iran and was established on 15 October 2002. It's the seventh official channel of IRIB and sometimes referred as Channel 7. The logo of the IRIB Amoozesh consists of two vertical lines and two horizontal lines on top of those two vertical lines, which is the sign of 《A》, which is the first letter of the word education

== During Pandemic ==
The Amoozesh TV channel has been used for broadcasting educational programs amid Corona threat.

== Logos ==
Second Logo (2010–2023)

Current Logo (2023–present)

== Popular programs ==
- Radio 7
- Ghand Pahloo
- Moshaereh
- Khooneh Injast
