= IFilm (TV channel) =

Iranian public TV channel

iFilm
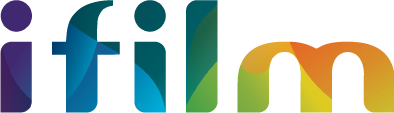
- Country: Iran
- Broadcast area: Asia and Guyana
- Headquarters: Tehran

Programming
- Languages: English, Arabic, Persian
- Picture format: 16:9 (576i, SDTV) 16:9 (1080p, HDTV)

Ownership
- Owner: Islamic Republic of Iran Broadcasting

History
- Launched: 9 September 2010; 15 years ago

Links
- Website: ifilmtv.ir

Availability

Terrestrial
- Jamaran: Ch43 UHF Digital
- Oqaab (Afghanistan): Channel 14

Streaming media
- IRIB IFilm Live Streaming

iFilm (Persian: [ˈaifiːlm], Arabic: [ˈaifilm, ˈaifiːlm]), also known as iFilm TV, is an Iranian entertainment network which consists of three channels in English, Arabic, and Persian. The network was launched on 9 September 2010. The original purpose of the channel is to present Iranian films and series to the global audience. The network was managed by Mohammad-Reza Khatami from its inauguration until he was replaced by Mehdi Mojtahed, son of Ayatollah Mojtahed Shabestari in June 2016.

In 2013, iFilm started an additional channel, broadcasting all content dubbed in English.

== Programs ==
The iFilm Network is a 24-hour TV channel, broadcasting an 8-hour block which is repeated twice, starting at 6:30PM Tehran Time. Programming includes TV series, movies, live quizzes on arts, backstage documentaries on films and ongoing productions, movie and film reviews, short films and documentaries about Iran. It usually shows series that already aired from various IRIB channels, but it has had a successful series production, Yadavari (Remembrance) (2013).

In 2015, iFilm was shortlisted by an international jury for a prestigious Eutelsat TV Award.
