= Sean Stokes =

United States Marine and Silver Star recipient (1983–2007)

Sean Andrew Stokes
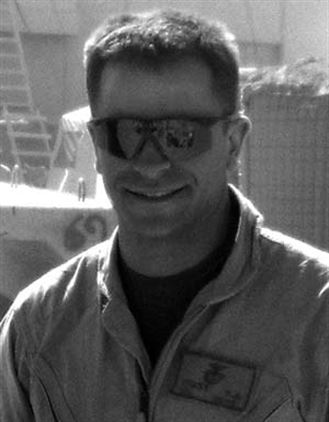
- Stokes in 2007
- Born: February 6, 1983; Fremont, California
- Died: July 30, 2007 (aged 24); Taqaddum, Iraq
- Burial place: Janesville Cemetery
- Military career
- Allegiance: United States
- Branch: United States Marine Corps
- Service years: 2001–2007
- Rank: Corporal
- Nickname: "Pathfinder"
- Units: 3rd Battalion, 1st Marines, 1st Marine Division
- Conflicts: Iraq War: Second Battle of Fallujah; Operation Phantom Fury (WIA); Battle of Haditha; Operation Phantom Thunder (DOW)
- Awards: Silver Star; Purple Heart x3 Combat Action Ribbon; Good Conduct Medal
- Website: www.sasmemorial.org

Sean Andrew Stokes (February 6, 1983 – July 30, 2007) † was a United States Marine who posthumously received the Silver Star for actions while serving with 3rd Battalion, 1st Marines during the Second Battle of Fallujah. Stokes was one of only three Marine privates to ever be awarded the Silver Star.

== Military career ==
At age 17, Stokes wanted to enlist in the U.S. Marine Corps shortly after the September 11, 2001 terrorist attacks, but his father denied him permission to enlist. When Stokes turned 18 in February 2002, he enlisted without his father's permission. He went to Marine Corps boot camp in San Diego. In 2004, then-Lance Corporal Stokes left his unit without permission in order to help a family member escape from domestic violence. After moving her to a new house, Stokes returned to Camp Pendleton. Stokes was subsequently court martialed, and reduced to the rank of Private.

He was then transferred to Lima Company, 3rd Battalion, 1st Marines (3/1). He was 21 years old, the lowest-ranking member of 2nd Squad, and one of the most senior rifleman in the platoon.

A few months after arriving at 3/1, Stokes deployed to Fallujah, Iraq, where in November 2004, he participated in Operation Phantom Fury. He killed nine enemy terrorists in Fallujah.

In 2005, Stokes returned to Iraq, this time near the city of Haditha. 3/1 deployed again in 2007, and Stokes, by now a Corporal, was selected to serve on the Battalion Commander's Personal Security Detachment.

=== Awards and honors ===

Silver Star
3 Purple Hearts	Combat Action Ribbon	Navy Unit Commendation
Marine Corps Good Conduct Medal	National Defense Service Medal	Iraq Campaign Medal with 2 campaign stars
Global War on Terrorism Expeditionary Medal	Global War on Terrorism Service Medal	Sea Service Deployment Ribbon with 2 service stars

== Personal life ==
Stokes was born in Fremont, California, and grew up in Auburn, California. When Stokes was 9 years old, his parents got a divorce, and he and his younger brother moved in with their father in Lake of the Pines, California, located on the outlying edge of Auburn. According to his father, they also lived in Alta Sierra, California when Stokes was young, and where he once found a 14 inch bass in the bathtub that Stokes had caught in a local pond.

He graduated from Bear River High School in 2001, where he played baseball and football. His high school football jersey was retired after his death. Teacher Alexander Croft said of Stokes: "He was one of those kids who you remember because he just stands out". He was engaged to be married to Sgt. Nicole Besier at the time of his death.

== Death ==
On 30 July 2007, while escorting the Battalion Commander across 3/1's Area of Operations in Iraq's Tharthar region, the convoy came to a section of road which had been rendered impassable by an improvised explosive device (IED) several days prior. Following protocol, Stokes dismounted his vehicle and began sweeping the surrounding area before attempting to move the convoy around the crater. However, there was a well-concealed IED, with two 155-millimeter shells that had been armed to detonate when someone stepped on the pressure plate. The booby-trap is called a "daisy chain" IED, because the first explosion automatically sets off a second one. The IED detonated as he stepped on it, wounding him fatally, and severely injuring his friend, Sgt. Bradley Adams, in the blast that followed.

== In popular culture ==
Military historian Patrick K. O'Donnell was embedded with Stokes' platoon for one year leading up to and during their deployment to Fallujah, and Stokes is a prominent figure in his 2006 non-fiction book We Were One: Shoulder to Shoulder with the Marines Who Took Fallujah. O'Donnell said his first impression of Stokes was his resemblance to Luke Skywalker in Star Wars. In 2006, Stokes was featured in an episode of Shootout! on the History Channel entitled "D-Day: Fallujah", wherein his actions in 2004 are dramatized while he and other Marines recount the details.

== Silver Star Citation ==
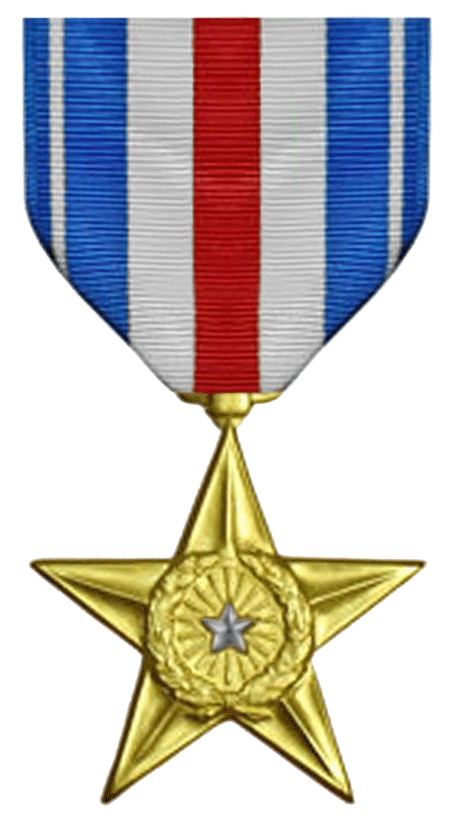

The President of the United States

Takes Pleasure in Presenting The Silver Star (Posthumously)
To Sean Andrew Stokes
Corporal, United States Marine Corps

For Services as Set Forth in the Following Citation:

For conspicuous gallantry and intrepidity in action against the enemy while serving as Rifleman, First Platoon, Company L, Third Battalion, First Marines, FIRST Marine Division, II Marine Expeditionary Force, from 9 November 2004 to 18 November 2004, in support of Operation IRAQI FREEDOM 03–05. Throughout nine days of high intensity urban combat in Fallujah, Corporal Stokes fought as his unit's point man, requiring him to repeatedly be the first man to engage enemy forces. On 9 and 11 November, Corporal Stokes led a four-man element into a building held by armed enemy. As they entered the building, his element was engaged with automatic rifle fire from within. Fearless in the face of danger, Corporal Stokes pressed forward in the close confines of the building against the enemy fire and killed the insurgent before his fellow Marines could be injured. On 17 November, an enemy hand grenade exploded beneath Corporal Stokes as he cleared a small house, severely wounding him. Though dazed and wounded from the blast, and rather than attempting to save himself and exit the building, he chose to ensure the Marines around him were protected and began suppressing the enemy within the house with his rifle. The fire he provided allowed the rest of his team to reach a covered position outside the house, where they organized an assault and reentered the building, killing the enemy in a counterattack. Corporal Stokes fought through Fallujah with the resolve of closing on the enemy, while protecting the Marines around him at all costs. By his extraordinary heroism in the face of extreme danger, zealous initiative, and exceptional dedication to duty, Corporal Stokes reflected great credit upon himself and upheld the highest traditions of the Marine Corps and the United States Naval Service.

== See also ==
- 2003 invasion of Iraq
- 2004 in Iraq
