= 3rd Battalion, 1st Marines =

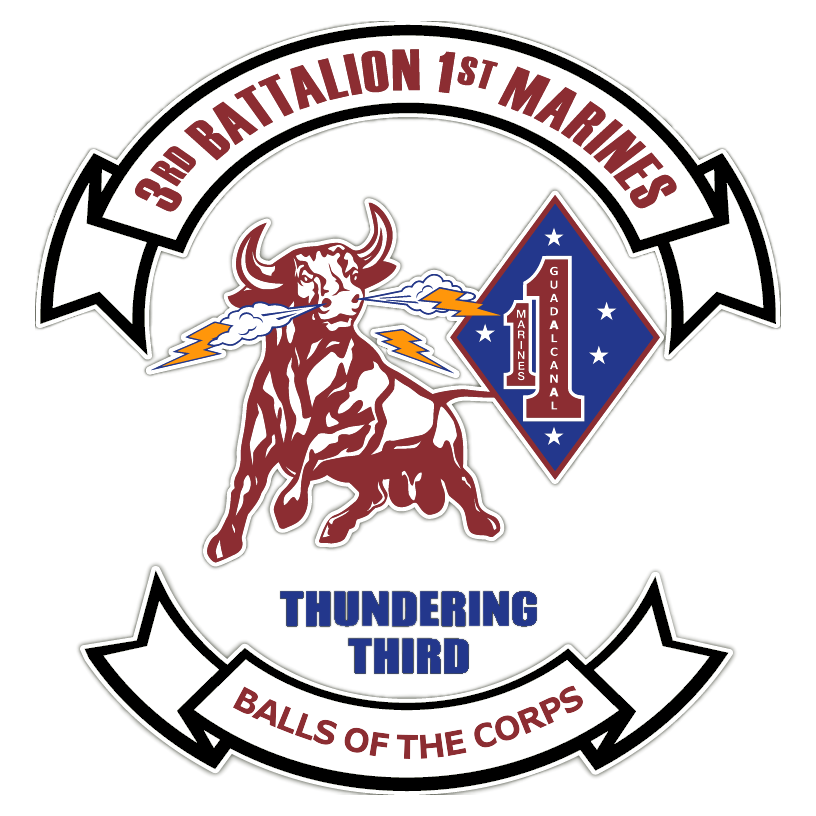
- Third Battalion, First Marine Regiment official logo
- Active: 12 March 1956 – October 1960; 16 February 1932 – 20 March 1947; 4 August 1950 – present
- Country: United States
- Branch: United States Marine Corps
- Type: Light infantry
- Role: Locate, close with, and destroy the enemy through fire and maneuver, and repel enemy assault through fire and close combat.
- Size: 1,200
- Part of: 1st Marine Regiment; 1st Marine Division
- Garrison/HQ: Camp Horno, Marine Corps Base Camp Pendleton
- Nicknames: "Thundering Third", Callsign: Brahma
- Mottos: The Balls of the Corps, Brahma Nation, BOTC
- Mascot: Brahma Bull
- Anniversaries: "3/1 Day" (March 1st) is the unit's anniversary
- Engagements: World War II; Guadalcanal campaign; Battle of Cape Gloucester; Battle of Peleliu; Battle of Okinawa; Korean War; Battle of Inchon; Second Battle of Seoul; Battle of Chosin Reservoir; Battle of Hwacheon; Battle of the Punchbowl; Battle of Bunker Hill (1952); First Battle of the Hook; Battle for Outpost Vegas; Battle of the Samichon River; Vietnam War; Operation Union; Operation Union II; Operation Badger Tooth; Operation Napoleon/Saline; Operation Swift; Operation Mameluke Thrust; Persian Gulf War; Operation Desert Storm; 1992 Los Angeles riots; Operation United Shield; Global War on Terrorism; War in Afghanistan; Iraq War; Operation Iraqi Freedom; Second Battle of Fallujah; Haditha Massacre; Operation Inherent Resolve
- Website: Official website

Commanders
- Current commander: LtCol J.T. Frerichs
- Ceremonial chief: SgtMaj Douglas E. Gardner
- Notable commanders: Richard P. Ross Jr. Foster C. LaHue; Carl W. Hoffman

3rd Battalion, 1st Marines (3/1) is an infantry battalion in the United States Marine Corps based out of Camp Horno on Marine Corps Base Camp Pendleton, California. Nicknamed the "Thundering Third", the battalion consists of approximately 1,200 Marines and Sailors and falls under the command of the 1st Marine Regiment and the 1st Marine Division.

== Subordinate units ==
Headquarters and Service Company

Company I (India Company)

Company K (Kilo Company)

Company L (Lima Company)

Company M (Mike Company)

Weapons Company

=== Beginnings ===
3rd Battalion, 1st Marines (3/1) was activated on 1 March 1941 at Guantanámo Bay, Cuba and assigned to the 1st Marine Division. In April of that year, they were relocated to Marine Barracks, Parris Island, South Carolina; the battalion was subsequently deactivated in October of that year.

=== World War II ===
On 16 February 1942, 3/1 was re-activated at New River, North Carolina. In July 1942, 3/1 deployed to Wellington, New Zealand and participated in the following World War II campaigns: Guadalcanal, Eastern New Guinea, New Britain, Peleliu, and Okinawa. Beginning in April 1946, 3/1 participated in the occupation of North China. The battalion was again deactivated on 20 March 1947, as part of the post-war drawdown of forces.

=== Korean War ===
The start of the Korean War saw the reactivation of 3/1 on 4 August 1950 at Marine Corps Base Camp Pendleton, California and their quick deployment to Korea in September. The battalion's first action was at the Battle of Inchon in September 1950. Following the recapture of Seoul, 3/1 along with the rest of the 1st Marine Division, was put back on ships and sailed around the Korean peninsula to the eastern coast of Korea. The battalion eventually landed at Wonsan in late October and from there participated in the Battle of Chosin Reservoir. During the battle they were the only battalion from the Chesty Puller's 1st Marine Regiment to make it as far north as Hagaru-ri.

After the withdrawal from Chosin Reservoir, 1st Marine Division marched to Hungnam to be evacuated. The battalion took part in fighting on the East Central Front and Western Front of the Jamestown Line for the remainder of the war. After the Korean Armistice Agreement was signed, they participated in the defense of the Korean Demilitarized Zone from July 1953 to April 1955. In April 1955, the battalion re-located to Camp Pendleton, California.

=== Cuban Missile Crisis ===
From October to December 1962, 3/1 was part of the amphibious task force sent to the Caribbean in response to the Cuban Missile Crisis.

=== Vietnam War ===
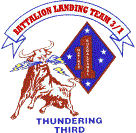
Older logo of 3/1

From January 1966 to May 1971, 3/1 fought in the Vietnam War, operating in Chu Lai, Da Nang, Thang Binh, Thanh Thuy, Cửa Việt, Ca Lu, Vandegrift Combat Base, Route 9, An Hoa, and Hoa Vang. In May 1971, the battalion re-located to MCB Camp Pendleton, California.

=== Post Vietnam & the 1980s ===
During this drawdown period, the Marines and Sailors of 3/1 participated in multiple Unit Deployment Program (UDP) rotations and Marine amphibious unit deployments.

=== Persian Gulf War & the 1990s ===
The battalion deployed to Saudi Arabia in December 1990 in support of Operation Desert Shield and in March 1991, they transitioned to combat operations during Operation Desert Storm.

In May 1992, 3/1 made the short drive up Interstate 5 to assisted local police with riot control operations during the 1992 Los Angeles riots.

In February and March 1995, 3/1 deployed to Somalia in support of Operation United Shield, to help the remaining UN troops evacuate.

=== Global war on terror ===
The next major deployment was in October 2000 to support Operation Determined Response after the USS Cole bombing in the Aden harbor of Yemen. Seventeen sailors died in the explosion and more than 35 were injured.

==== Operation Iraqi Freedom ====
Marines from 3rd Battalion, 1st Marines and 3rd Battalion, 5th Marines during the Second Battle of Fallujah.

While on deployment in 2002 with the 11th Marine Expeditionary Unit (MEU), 3/1 was part of the Failaka Island attack in Kuwait. A terrorist attack on unarmed Marines conducting training exercises on the island which resulted in the death of one Marine, Lance Corporal Antonio J. "Tony" Sledd. Though the Iraq War itself would not begin until a few months later in March of the following year, Sledd is considered by some to be the first U.S. combat casualty of the war, as he was killed by hostile fire while training for its commencement.

In January 2003, 3/1 re-deployed to Kuwait in support of Operation Iraqi Freedom (OIF). In March of that year the battalion took part in the 2003 invasion of Iraq, including the Battle of Nasiriyah. The battalion returned to Camp Pendleton in the summer of 2003.

The unit then re-deployed to Iraq in mid-2004, and was based near Fallujah. They were the main effort in November 2004 during Operation Al Fajr (pronounced Al Fad-jer), tasked with liberating the city of Fallujah from insurgents. Before the assault commenced, the operation was known as Operation Phantom Fury. This battle would later be described as "some of the heaviest urban combat U.S. forces have been involved in since the Battle of Huế City in Vietnam in 1968".

The battalion was part of the composition of Regimental Combat Team 1 (RCT 1). RCT 1 was partly responsible for clearing the infamous Jolan District among others. Alongside RCT 7, four Marine battalions (including 1/3, 1/8, and 3/5) and various US Army units, 3/1 was tasked with reclaiming the city of Fallujah from unrest. This historical deployment would be well-documented and its footage spawned many "combat montages," of which one in particular is often shown to Marine recruits to motivate them for the field phase of recruit training.

The battalion re-deployed back to Iraq in September 2005 and were attached to 2nd Marine Regiment (known as Regimental Combat Team 2), and on 20 February 2006 were attached to the 7th Marine Regiment (known as Regimental Combat Team 7) in western Iraq, carrying out security and stabilization operations. The battalion returned to Camp Pendleton in late March 2006.

On 10 April 2007, 3/1 deployed as the ground combat element (GCE) of the 13th MEU. They were ordered into Iraq as part of Operation Phantom Thunder. Operating north of Fallujah and Karmah in the Tharthar region in AO Anaheim, MARSOC units attached to the MEU were operating for several days before the GCE began operating on 15 June 2007. They were to establish a Coalition presence in an area that had only had 14 days of Coalition presence since the invasion in March 2003. The battalion concluded operations in Iraq after 90 days on 20 September 2007, and soon after re-embarked on the naval strike group and set sail for the United States and returned to Camp Pendleton on 17 November 2007.

In July 2008, 3/1 deployed as the GCE for the 31st MEU. The battalion returned to Camp Pendleton in January 2009.

===== Haditha massacre =====
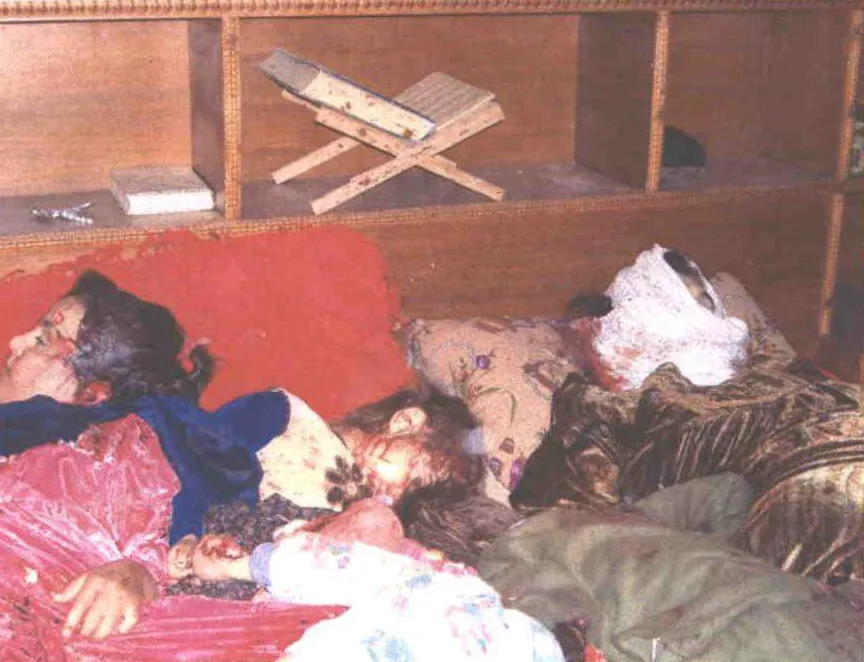
The bodies of Ayda Yassin Ahmed (44) and her children Sabaa (10), Ayesha (3), Zainab (5) and Mohammed (8). On 19 November 2005, U.S. Marines from 3/1 killed 24 Iraqi civilians during the Haditha massacre as retribution for an IED attack.

On 19 November 2005, a group of Marines from Kilo Company 3/1 killed 24 unarmed Iraqi civilians in the city of Haditha as retribution for an IED attack that killed one Marine.

An initial Marine Corps communique reported that 15 civilians were killed by the bomb's blast and eight insurgents were subsequently killed when the Marines returned fire against those attacking the convoy. However, other evidence uncovered by the media contradicted the Marines' account, prompting the United States military to open an investigation into the incident.

On 21 December 2006, eight Marines from 3/1 were charged in connection with the incident. By 17 June 2008, six defendants had had their cases dropped and a seventh found not guilty. The exception was former Staff Sergeant, now-Private Frank Wuterich, who was convicted of a single count of negligent dereliction of duty on 24 January 2012. Wuterich received a rank reduction and pay cut but avoided jail time.

==== Operation Enduring Freedom ====
In April 2010, 3/1 deployed to Helmand Province, Afghanistan in support of Operation Enduring Freedom (OEF). The battalion conducted combat operations in the Garmsir District, including activity in the Koshtay and Safar regions. The battalion returned to Camp Pendleton in November 2010.

==== Operation Inherent Resolve & the 2010s ====
In November 2011, 3/1 served as the GCE for the 11th MEU and deployed to the Indo-Pacific, Middle East, and Africa. The battalion returned to Camp Pendleton in June 2012. On 14 February 2012, 3/1 suffered a tragedy when Hospital Corpsman 3rd Class Kyler L. Estrada, assigned to India Company, was shot and killed during a live-fire and maneuvering night training exercise in Djibouti.

In October 2013, 3/1 was part of a UDP rotation to Camp Hansen, Japan. The battalion returned to Camp Pendleton in April 2014.

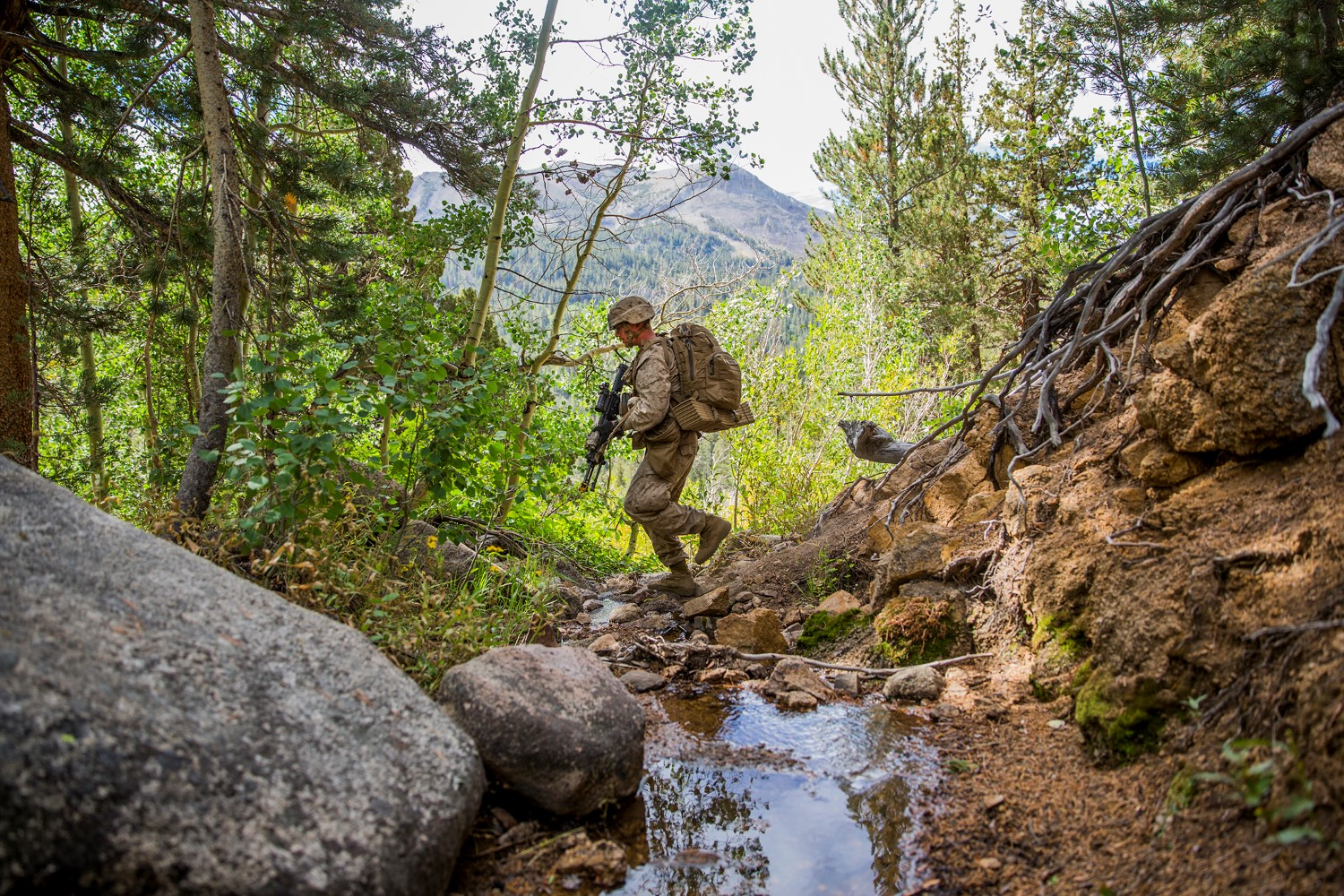
3/1 training at Marine Corps Mountain Warfare Training Center in Bridgeport, Calif., Aug. 29, 2014. 3/1 will become the 15th MEU's ground combat element in October.

In May 2015, 3/1 served as the GCE (Battalion Landing Team 3/1 a.k.a. BLT 3/1) for the 15th MEU and deployed to the Indo-Pacific, Middle East, and Africa in support of Operation Inherent Resolve. The battalion was tasked with providing combat training and tactical advisement to foreign militaries to prepare them to fight the Islamic State. The battalion returned to Camp Pendleton in December 2015. On 17 May 2015, 3/1 suffered a tragedy when one of their MV-22 Osprey helicopters crashed during a training event in Hawaii, resulting in the loss of two Marines.

In late 2016, 3/1 was part of a UDP rotation to Camp Fuji, Japan. The battalion returned to Camp Pendleton in spring 2017.

In July 2018, 3/1 served as the GCE for the 13th MEU and deployed to the Indo-Pacific and Middle East. The battalion returned to Camp Pendleton in March 2019.

==== The 2020s ====
Between October 2020 and April 2021, 3/1 was assigned to the Special Purpose Marine-Air Ground Task Force and deployed to the Middle East region.

In March 2023, 3/1 was assigned to Marine Rotational Force – Darwin and deployed to the Australia and the Indo-Pacific. The battalion returned to Camp Pendleton in October 2023. During this deployment, 3/1 suffered another tragedy when one of their MV-22 Osprey helicopters crashed during a training event, resulting in the loss of three Marines.

== Medal of Honor recipients from 3rd Battalion, 1st Marines ==
=== World War II ===
- Private First Class William Adelbert Foster – Company K – 1945
- Sergeant Elbert Luther Kinser – Company I – 1945

=== Korean War ===
- Private First Class William Bernard Baugh – Weapons Company – 1950
- Major Reginald Rodney Myers – H&S Company – 1950
- Captain Carl Leonard Sitter – Company G – 1950
- Technical Sergeant Harold Edward Wilson – Company G – 1951

== Notable former members ==
- Smedley D. Butler, "Old Gimlet Eye", Mexican Revolution and World War I, Medal of Honor
- Richard P. Ross Jr., World War II, Legion of Merit with Combat "V"
- Foster LaHue, World War II, Silver Star
- Walter Fillmore, Vietnam War, Bronze Star
- Joseph F. Dunford, Jr., Iraq War and War in Afghanistan, Chairman of the Joint Chiefs of Staff
- Bradley Kasal, Persian Gulf War and Iraq War, Navy Cross
- Sean Stokes, Iraq War, Silver Star, Killed in Iraq
- Zach Iscol, Iraq War, Bronze Star, Commissioner of New York City Emergency Management
- Frank Wuterich, leader of the Haditha massacre

== Unit awards ==
A unit citation or commendation is an award bestowed upon an organization for the action cited. Members of the unit who participated in said actions are allowed to wear on their uniforms the awarded unit citation. 3/1 has been presented with the following awards:

Streamer	Award	Year(s)	Additional Info
	Presidential Unit Citation Streamer with one Silver and four Bronze Stars	1942, 1944, 1945, 1950, 1950, 1951, 1966, 1966–1967, 1967, 1968, 2003	Guadalcanal, Peleliu-Ngesebus, Okinawa, Korea, Vietnam, Iraq
	Joint Meritorious Unit Award Streamer	1992–1993	Somalia
	Navy Unit Commendation Streamer with two Bronze Stars	1952–1953, 1968, 1990–1991, 2004-2005	Korea, Vietnam, Southwest Asia, Iraq
	Meritorious Unit Commendation with three Bronze Stars	1969, 1971, 1987, 2000 – 2001, 2007, 2010	Vietnam, Iraq, Afghanistan
	Marine Corps Expeditionary Streamer	2001	Yemen
	American Defense Service Streamer with one Bronze Star	1941	World War II
	Asiatic-Pacific Campaign Streamer with one Silver and one Bronze Star		Guadalcanal, Eastern New Guinea, New Britain, Peleliu, Okinawa
	World War II Victory Streamer	1941–1945	Pacific War
	Navy Occupation Service Streamer with "ASIA"		
	China Service Streamer with one Bronze Star	September 1946 – June 1947	North China
	National Defense Service Streamer with three Bronze Stars	1950–1954, 1961–1974, 1990–1995, 2001–present	Korean War, Vietnam War, Gulf War, war on terrorism
	Korean Service Streamer with two Silver Stars		Inchon-Seoul, Chosin Reservoir, East-Central Front, Western Front
	Armed Forces Expeditionary Streamer	1992–1993	Somalia
	Vietnam Service Streamer with two Silver and two Bronze Stars	July 1965 – April 1971, April – December 1975	Chu Lai, Da Nang, Dong Ha, Qui Nhon, Hue, Phu Bai, Quang Tri, Operation New Arrival
	Iraq Campaign Streamer	2003-2009	Al Anbar, Fallujah, Haditha, Baghdad, Ramadi, Operation Phantom Fury
	Global War on Terrorism Expeditionary Streamer	March 2003 – December 2004, 2015	
	Global War on Terrorism Service Streamer	2001–present	
	Korea Presidential Unit Citation Streamer	1950-1953	Korean War
	Vietnam Gallantry Cross with Palm Streamer		
	Vietnam Meritorious Unit Citation Civil Actions Streamer		

== Associations ==
=== Huntington Beach 3/1 Marines Foundation ===
In 2005, 3/1 was "adopted" by the citizens of nearby Huntington Beach, California. The Huntington Beach 3/1 Marines Foundation was formed the following year to oversee all programs, projects and activities in support of the Marines, Sailors and families of the Thundering Third. The city annually hosts a "3/1 RUN" in early March and the funds raised are used to support the Marines, Sailors, and families of the battalion during peace and wartime.

=== 3rd Battalion 1st Marines Association ===
3rd Battalion 1st Marines Association is a non-profit organization formed to help connect generations of Thundering Third Marines, Sailors, and families, to honor the fallen, and to preserve the battalion's brotherhood and family.

== In popular culture ==
=== Books ===
In 2006, writer and historian Patrick K. O'Donnell published his book We Were One: Shoulder to Shoulder with the Marines Who Took Fallujah detailing the heroic actions he witnessed while embedded with Lima Company's 1st Platoon during 3/1's Fallujah deployment. The book has received overwhelming praise and is on the Commandant's Professional Reading List as of 2023.

In 2012, writer Nathaniel R. Helms published his book My Men are My Heroes: The Brad Kasal Story recounting Sergeant Major Bradley Kasal's Navy Cross actions while serving as First Sergeant of Weapons Company 3/1 during Operation Phantom Fury.

=== Movies and Television ===
In 2006, a documentary series on The History Channel called Shootout! ran two episodes covering the actions of Cpl. Sean Stokes, SgtMaj. Bradley Kasal, and 1st Marine Division during Operation Phantom Fury.

In 2007, a drama film called Battle for Haditha was released. It is based on 3/1's involvement in the Haditha Massacre.

In 2010, a documentary called The Western Front was released. Directed and produced by Zachary Iscol, a former Captain in 3/1, the movie documents his experiences as a Marine officer and the change in tactics during the war.

=== Video & Board Games ===
In 2005, Close Combat: First to Fight was released. Designed with input from former and active-duty Marines from 3/1 who had participated in Fallujah, Iraq during Operation Phantom Fury.

In 2011, Phantom Fury: The 2nd Battle for Fallujah, a solitaire board game based on the actions of 3/1 during Operation Phantom Fury was released by Nuts! Publishing.

In 2023, Six Days in Fallujah released to the public. Set in the Second Battle of Fallujah the game follows the Marines of 3/1 as they fight the Iraqi insurgency in the city of Fallujah, Iraq.

== See also ==
- List of United States Marine Corps battalions
- Organization of the United States Marine Corps
- Operation Phantom Fury
- Battle of Chosin Reservoir
