= Six Days in Fallujah =

Upcoming video game

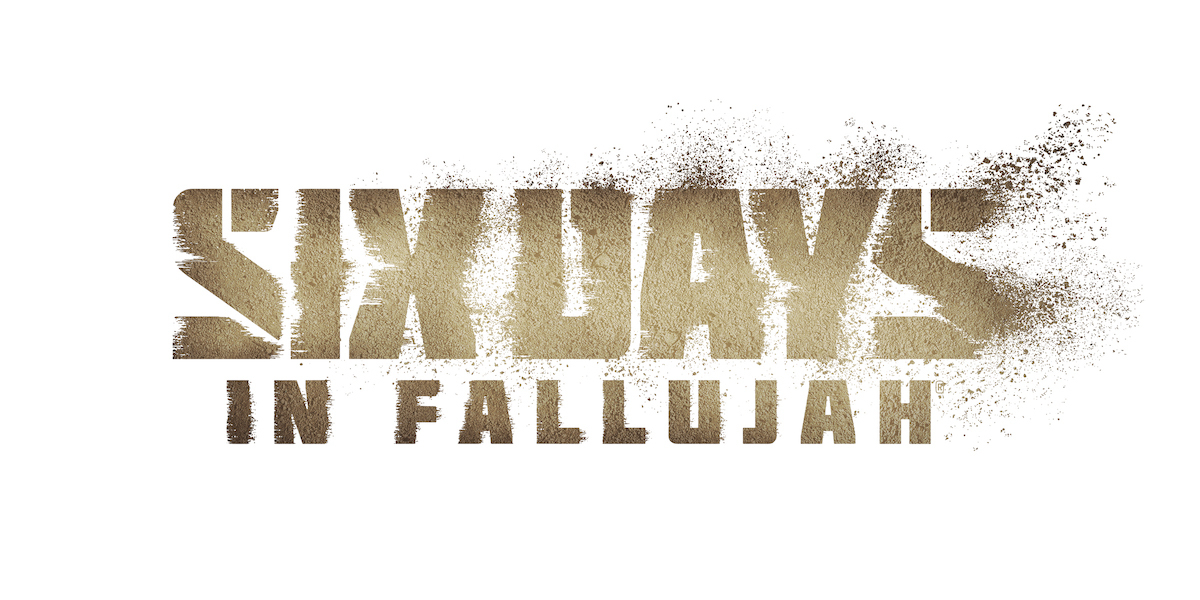
- Developers: Highwire Games & Victura
- Publisher: Secret Mode
- Composer: Elliot Leung
- Engine: Unreal Engine 4
- Platform: Windows
- Release: Windows; June 22, 2023 (early access)
- Genre: Tactical shooter
- Modes: Single-player, multiplayer

Six Days in Fallujah is an upcoming tactical first-person shooter video game developed by Highwire Games and published by Victura. Set in the Second Battle of Fallujah of the Iraq War over the span of six days in November 2004, the game follows the United States Marine Corps' 3rd Battalion, 1st Marines (3/1) as they fight the Iraqi insurgency in the city of Fallujah, Iraq. Its campaign follows two perspectives: a squad of Marines from 3/1 deployed to battle the insurgents, and an Iraqi family attempting to escape the city in the midst of the battle.

Originally developed by Atomic Games, Six Days was announced in 2009, with a release slated for 2010, published by Konami; however, controversy surrounding the game's appropriateness and handling of its contentious and then-very-recent subject matter led to Konami departing the project, and Atomic Games' bankruptcy in 2011 left the game on hold indefinitely. Around 2016, Victura and Highwire began developing a revived version of the game, which was announced in February 2021. After several delays, Six Days in Fallujah was released in early access on Microsoft Windows on June 22, 2023.

== Gameplay ==
Missions typically begin with a briefing (often incorporating archival footage and interviews) and then play out in semi-open urban zones where players must clear buildings, locate objectives (such as enemy strongholds or supply caches), and extract or hold territory. Gameplay demands slow, deliberate movement, room-clearing tactics, team coordination, and awareness of enemy concealment. While firefights occur, the primary focus is on tension, surprise, and the unpredictability of urban combat as opposed to corridor-based run-and-gun.

Players assume control of squad member in U.S. Marine fireteams (and in future updates, Iraqi civilian or military perspectives) as they navigate the urban combat environment of Fallujah. The game currently offers two primary mission types: story missions and procedural missions. According to the developers, the story missions recreate key moments from the real battle and function also as tutorials for the squad-control systems. Procedural missions, by contrast, generate urban maps and enemy placements algorithmically to maximize variability and playability, however, players are unable to reliably memorize layouts. In early access, players can play solo (accompanied by AI teammates) or in co-op with up to four real players. The solo mode uses an AI fireteam system which allows issuing tactics manually. One of the game's signature mechanics is its Procedural Architecture system. Instead of fixed, static levels, buildings, interiors and street layouts are reshuffled each time a mission begins.

A hallmark of the game is its emphasis on authentic squad tactics. The player can issue commands to team members such as suppressing fire, breaching doors, or holding positions. With the “Go! Command” system, the player can select behaviors for the fireteam with minimal menu interaction. Enemy AI is designed to emulate insurgent tactics: flanking, ambushing, hiding inside civilian structures, and using urban cover to create uncertainty.

The game emphasizes immersive sensory elements: transitions from bright outdoors to dark interiors, echoing footsteps inside buildings, distant explosions, and the ambient noise of urban warfare. According to previews, the absence of a mini-map for some modes further heightens spatial awareness and tension. And graphical enhancements, such as ray-traced lighting via RTX Global Illumination, are used to bolster the realism of the environment, with smoke, dust and dynamic lighting effects presented as part of the combat conditions.

== Development ==
=== Background ===
According to Atomic Games president Peter Tamte, Six Days was conceived in the early 2000s, when one of their divisions was tasked with developing military simulation programs for the U.S. Marine Corps, and some Marines from 3rd Battalion, 1st Marines were assigned to assist as technical advisors. However, shortly into development, 3/1 was deployed to Iraq and participated in the Second Battle of Fallujah. The inspiration for the game came from a U.S. Marine who participated in the battle and suggested a video game based on it. Tamte later stated that "When they came back from Fallujah, they asked us to create a video game about their experiences there, and it seemed like the right thing to do."

Tamte stated that the goal of Six Days from the start was to create the most realistic military shooter possible, and that "Ultimately, all of us are curious about what it would really be like to be in a war. I've been playing military shooters for ages, and at a certain point when I'm playing the game, I know it's fake. You can tell a bunch of guys sat in a room and designed it. That's always bothered me." He further elaborated that adapting the battle into a video game as opposed to a different form of media came from how "[t]here are things that you can do in video games that you cannot do in other forms of media. And a lot of that has to do with presenting players with the dilemmas that the Marines saw in Fallujah and then giving them the choice of how to handle that dilemma. And I think at that point, you know—when you watch a movie, you see the decisions that somebody else made. But when you make a decision yourself, then you get a much deeper level of understanding."

=== Atomic Games development ===
The team at Atomic Games interviewed over 70 individuals, composed of returning U.S. Marines, Iraqi civilians, Iraqi insurgents, war historians, and senior military officials, and learned the psychological complexity of the battle. The game's director, Juan Benito, elaborated that "Through our interviews with all of the Marines, we discovered that there was an emotional, psychological arc to the Battle of Fallujah." According to one of the developers who worked on the game, the development team also consulted non-fiction books about the battle as part of their research, such as Patrick K. O'Donnell's We Were One: Shoulder to Shoulder with the Marines Who Took Fallujah, incorporating their recollections into the game's events and story-line.

Atomic Games described Six Days as a survival horror game, but not in the traditional sense: the fear in Six Days comes not from monsters or the supernatural, but from the irregular tactics and ruthlessness of the combatants in Fallujah. Benito stated that "Many of the insurgents had no intention of leaving the city alive, so their entire mission might be to lie in wait, with a gun trained at a doorway, for days just waiting for a Marine to pop his head in. They went door-to-door clearing houses, and most of the time the houses would be empty. But every now and then, they would encounter a stunningly lethal situation... which, of course, rattled the Marines psychologically." GamePro stated that for Benito, depicting the fear and misery of the battle was a top priority: "These are scary places, with scary things happening inside of them. In the game, you're plunging into the unknown, navigating through darkened interiors, and 'surprises' left by the insurgency. In most modern military shooters, the tendency is to turn the volume up to 11 and keep it there. Our game turns it up to 12 at times but we dial it back down, too, so we can establish a cadence."

Atomic Games stated that Six Days would feature destructible and degradable environments using a custom rendering engine, which they claimed surpassed the destructible environments of the Battlefield series, let alone any game released or in development at the time. Atomic Games clarified these destructible environments were not a "goofy, out-of-place marketing gimmick", but a deliberate feature to reflect the actual Battle of Fallujah, during which U.S. Marines used explosives to breach buildings and demolish structures insurgents were hiding in. Tamte stated the game would feature "a meticulously recreated in-game version of Fallujah, complete with real life Marines lending their names and likenesses, as well as recreations of specific events from the battle. It's almost like time travel. You're experiencing the events as they really happened."

=== Cancellation ===
On April 27, 2009, it was announced that Konami, the intended publisher of Six Days, had suspended its role as its publisher due to controversy, though the game would remain in development by Atomic Games. On August 6, 2009, Atomic Games stated they were unable to obtain a new publisher and would let go of some staff. IndustryGamers reported the following day that, per a source, "Out of 75 people, less than a dozen are left and about a third of that isn't even developers. The remaining team is basically a skeleton cleanup crew that will be gone soon too. They are trying to downplay the extent of these layoffs, but the reality is that Atomic is pretty much dead."

On March 2, 2010, IGN reported that Six Days was finished and would be released as planned. However, this never happened, and Atomic Games' bankruptcy in 2011 left the game's future uncertain.

On August 8, 2012, it was revealed that Sony may have once considered publishing the title; indeed, a report in 2021 confirmed Sony Interactive Entertainment's Santa Monica Studio had developed the game at one point. On August 26, 2012, Tamte informed Digital Spy that Six Days was "definitely not canceled" and remains "very important". In 2018, Tamte again stated that the game was not cancelled, that the assets were still intact, and that it would eventually be finished and released at an undetermined future date.

=== Revival ===
In February 2021, it was announced that Victura, a company formed by Peter Tamte in 2016, would release the game later the same year, and that Highwire Games—including former Bungie developers who worked on Halo and Destiny—had been contracted as developers. This revived version would feature extensive commentary from U.S. Marines and Iraqi civilians, as well as two playable campaigns: one in which the player controls a squad of Marines to hunt down insurgents while avoiding civilian casualties, and another where the player controls a patriarch of an Iraqi civilian family as they attempt to escape war-torn Fallujah.

After a dearth of reports over its developmental status throughout the year, the developers announced that the game would be delayed to 2022 due to a lack of manpower, resources, and time. The game was later delayed again to some time in 2023 with no announcement. In May 2023, it was announced that the game would release in early access for Windows on June 22 of that year. There were no further delays, and Six Days released in early access on Steam as planned on June 22, 2023.

== Controversy ==
Shortly after the initial announcement of the game, Six Days was met with significant criticism. Critics of Six Days, ranging from Coalition veterans to Iraqi civilians to anti-war groups, argued that the battle was too recent for the game to be in good taste compared to games about earlier conflicts (the game's initial slated release year of 2010 was only six years after the battle); that the game would be unable to effectively handle its controversial subject matter; that important context and information, such as the civilian casualties of the battle or why the 2003 invasion of Iraq happened, would be excluded or twisted to suit a pro-American narrative; and that even if the developers had good intentions with the game, adapting the battle into a video game would trivialize it as a form of entertainment. British anti-war group Stop the War Coalition called the game "sick" and alleged it erased the atrocities of the battle, which they described as "amongst the worst of the war crimes carried out in an illegal and immoral war". Reg Keys, father of slain Royal Military Police Lance Corporal Thomas Keys, stated that "Considering the enormous loss of life in the Iraq War, glorifying it in a video game demonstrates very poor judgement and bad taste... These horrific events should be confined to the annals of history, not trivialized and rendered for thrill-seekers to play out... It's entirely possible that Muslim families will buy the game, and for them it may prove particularly harrowing. Even worse, it could end up in the hands of a fanatical young Muslim and incite him to consider some form of retaliation or retribution." Tim Collins, a former lieutenant Colonel of the 1st Battalion Royal Irish Regiment, shared a similar disposition. Collins stated, "It's much too soon to start making video games about a war that's still going on, and an extremely flippant response to one of the most important events in modern history. It's particularly insensitive given what happened in Fallujah, and I will certainly oppose the release of this game."

The decision to revive the game's development in 2021 drew additional criticism, with a number of critics, including the Council on American–Islamic Relations, calling for it to be denied licensing from Sony, Microsoft, and Valve, if not canceled entirely. Some features in the game were also criticized after its release; for instance, James Troughton of TheGamer noted interview footage and information presented in loading screens were all from U.S. Marines and thus only presented an American perspective on the battle without any commentary from Iraqi civilians.

=== Developer response ===
In a 2009 interview with Joystiq, Peter Tamte, responding to criticism, stated that "As we've watched the dialog that's taken place about the game, there is definitely one point that we want people to understand about the game. And that is, it's not about the politics of whether the U.S. should have been there or not. It is really about the stories of the Marines who were in Fallujah and the question, the debate about the politics, that is something for the politicians to worry about. We're focused now on what actually happened on the ground."

In a later interview with GamesIndustry after the game's revival in 2021, Tamte addressed another source of criticism—how the game would handle the atrocities of the battle and the Iraq War, and whether they would be part of gameplay or depicted at all—stating, "We're not asking players to commit atrocities in the game. Are we effectively sanitizing events by not doing that? I don't think that we need to portray the atrocities in order for people to understand the human cost. We can do that without the atrocities." Tamte added that the game would not attempt to push a political position on the Iraq War or its necessity, though it would "give players the context for why they're in the city, why this battle exists", and would show sides of the conflict beyond just the American perspective; he further denied allegations that the game was propaganda, and stated the U.S. government was not funding or benefiting from the game and that, though he had developed training simulators for the U.S. military, he had not been associated with that in over a decade.

In response to criticism that Six Days only shows the American perspective of the battle, Highwire announced plans to add proper perspectives from civilians and other Coalition militaries by 2024.
