= 3/1 =

3/1 may refer to:

- March 1 (month-day date notation)
- January 3 (day-month date notation)
- 3rd Battalion, 1st Marines
