= Webb D. Sawyer =

United States Marine Corps general (1918–1995)

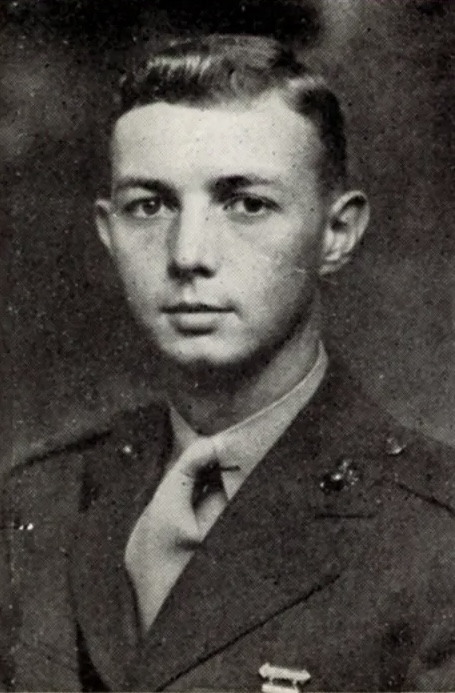
- Nickname: "Buzz"
- Born: August 31, 1918; Toledo, Ohio, U.S.
- Died: April 26, 1995 (aged 76) La Jolla, California, U.S.
- Buried: Fort Rosecrans National Cemetery; San Diego, California
- Allegiance: United States
- Branch: United States Marine Corps
- Service years: 1941–1969
- Rank: Brigadier General
- Commands: 1st Battalion, 7th Marines; 2nd Battalion, 7th Marines; 5th Marine Regiment
- Conflicts: World War II; Battle of Kwajalein; Battle of Saipan; Battle of Tinian; Battle of Iwo Jima; Korean War; Battle of Inchon; Second Battle of Seoul; Battle of Chosin Reservoir; Battle of Hwacheon; Vietnam War
- Awards: Navy Cross; Silver Star (3); Legion of Merit (2); Bronze Star w/ Combat "V"; Purple Heart

Webb Duane Sawyer (August 31, 1918 – April 26, 1995) was a highly decorated United States Marine with the rank of brigadier general. He was awarded the Navy Cross and three Silver Stars during one deployment in Korea.

== Early life and World War II ==
Webb D. Sawyer was born on August 31, 1918, in Toledo, Ohio. Upon graduating from the University of Toledo, he commissioned into the Marine Corps in 1941.

During World War II, he was assigned to the 3rd Battalion, 24th Marines, 4th Marine Division. Captain Sawyer took part in the battles of Kwajalein, Saipan, and Tinian as the battalion operations officer. At Saipan, he also assumed the role of executive officer of the battalion when the original executive officer was wounded. He was awarded a Bronze Star for his actions at Saipan. Webb was promoted to major, where he assumed the position of regimental operations officer for the 24th Marine Regiment during the battle of Iwo Jima.

After World War II, he was known as an expert in the reduction of fortifications while serving as an instructor at Quantico, Virginia.

== Korean War ==
With the outbreak of the Korean War, Major Sawyer was given command of 2nd Battalion, 7th Marines, 1st Marine Division. He took part in the landing at Inchon and the battle of Seoul in September 1950. On the night of November 3, 1950, during the advance into North Korea from Wonsan, Sawyer's battalion was fiercely assaulted, but he managed to close numerous gaps created in the line and led his Marines to victory. One week later, subzero temperatures arrived in the Chosin Reservoir area, and the Chinese military followed by the end of the month, beginning the battle of Chosin Reservoir. The Marines began retreating back to Wonsan.

On December 6, the retreating Marines encountered an enemy roadblock position. Sawyer led an assault on the position and repelled the enemy. He continued directing the fighting for the next 22 hours and refused evacuation despite being wounded in the foot by shrapnel from mortar fire. On December 8, after 11 days of constant fighting, his depleted battalion was providing flanking protection during the attack on Hill 1304. Sawyer observed a rifle company in the process of being outflanked by the enemy and made his way to over difficult terrain despite his foot wound. Sawyer led the attack and routed the enemy from his position, inflicting heavy losses. After taking the hill, he led the remnants of his battalion four miles down a steep mountain. Sawyer was awarded a total of three Silver Stars for his actions during the fighting in the Chosin Reservoir area.

Sawyer was subsequently promoted to lieutenant colonel and took command of the 1st Battalion, 7th Marines. On April 22, during the battle of Hwacheon, he led his battalion in seizing numerous enemy positions. That night, an adjacent unit on his left flank was fiercely attacked, and he quickly deployed his Marines to attack the enemy force. He remained in a forward command post throughout the night and into the morning, directing his men in repulsing numerous enemy assaults. The Chinese attackers numbered approximately 2,000, and at several points, the Marines engaged the enemy in hand-to-hand combat as their lines were penetrated. Private First Class Herbert Littleton smothered a grenade with his body and was posthumously awarded the Medal of Honor. The enemy was ultimately forced to withdraw after suffering heavy casualties. For his actions during the battle, Lieutenant Colonel Sawyer was awarded the Navy Cross.

== Later career and life ==
From April 1960 to July 1961, Sawyer served as the commanding officer of the 5th Marine Regiment. He later saw additional service during the Vietnam War. He retired from the Marine Corps as a Brigadier General on July 31, 1969. Webb D. Sawyer died on April 26, 1995, in La Jolla, California.

== See also ==
- List of Navy Cross recipients for the Korean War

Military offices
Preceded by Tolson A. Smoak	Commanding Officer of the 5th Marine Regiment; April 9, 1960 – July 11, 1961	Succeeded by Charles E. Warren
