= Reginald R. Myers =

Reginald Rodney Myers
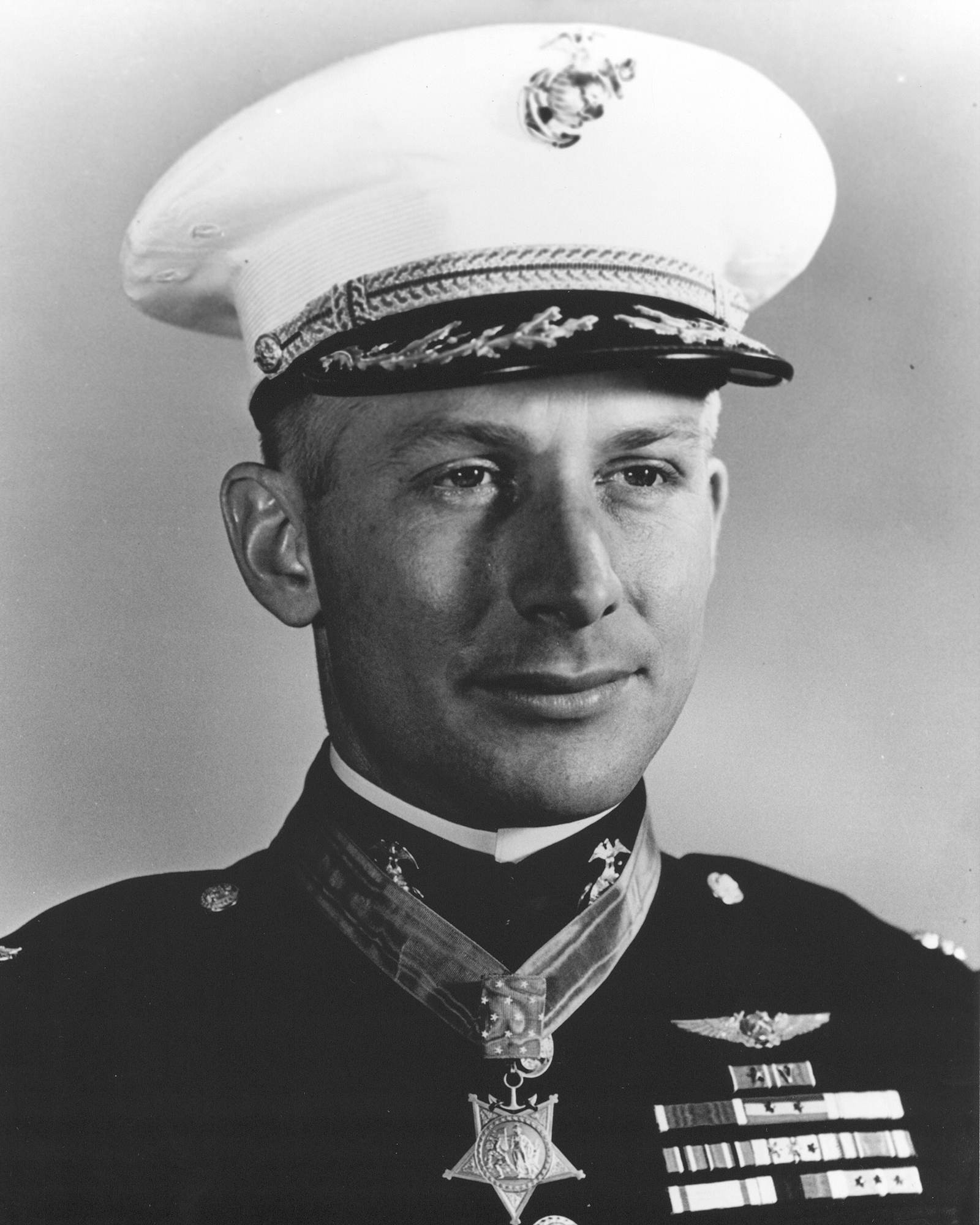
- Born: November 26, 1919; Boise, Idaho
- Died: October 23, 2005 (aged 85); Jupiter, Florida
- Burial place: Arlington National Cemetery
- Military career
- Allegiance: United States
- Branch: United States Marine Corps
- Service years: 1941–1967
- Rank: Colonel
- Unit: 3rd Battalion 1st Marines
- Conflicts: World War II: Battle of Guadalcanal; Battle of Okinawa; Korean War: Battle of Inchon; Battle of Chosin Reservoir
- Awards: Medal of Honor; Legion of Merit; Bronze Star Medal (2); Purple Heart

Colonel Reginald Rodney Myers (November 26, 1919 – October 23, 2005) was a United States Marine Corps officer. He received the Medal of Honor for defeating 4,000 men with a group of 250 United Nations troops in November 1950 during the Battle of Chosin Reservoir in the Korean War.

== Early years ==
Reginald Rodney Myers was born on November 26, 1919, in Boise, Idaho. He received his early schooling and graduated from high school in Salt Lake City, Utah. He graduated from the University of Idaho in Moscow, Idaho, in June 1941 with a Bachelor of Science degree in Mechanical Engineering. He attained the rank of cadet colonel in the Reserve Officers Training Corps at the university. On September 1, 1941, he resigned his Army Reserve commission to accept appointment as a second lieutenant in the United States Marine Corps.

Myers was a member of Idaho Alpha chapter of Sigma Alpha Epsilon.

== Marine Corps service ==
Myers completed Marine Officers' Basic School at the Philadelphia Navy Yard, then served as a company commander at the Marine Corps Base, San Diego, California.

== World War II ==
In June 1942, Myers joined the Marine Detachment aboard the USS New Orleans for a year duty at sea, during which he fought the Japanese at Guadalcanal, Tulagi, the Eastern Solomons, and Tassafaronga. He was promoted to first lieutenant in October 1942, and to captain in April 1943. In July 1943, Myers became commanding officer of the Marine detachment on board the USS Minneapolis and participated in the Gilbert, Marshall, Marianas, and Western Caroline Islands campaigns. Returning briefly to the United States in October 1944, he was promoted to major in January 1945. Myers returned to the Pacific area in June 1945, and served with the 5th Marines, 1st Marine Division, during the assault on Okinawa, and in the landing on and occupation of Northern China.

=== Inter-war years ===
Myers returned to the United States in May 1946, and served at Mare Island, California, Norfolk, Virginia and Cherry Point, North Carolina. At Cherry Point, he served as Assistant G-4, Aircraft, Fleet Marine Force, Atlantic, and 2nd Marine Aircraft Wing, from August 1948 until May 1950.

== Korean War ==
Ordered to Korea in July 1950, Myers served as executive officer, 3rd Battalion, 1st Marines, 1st Marine Division. For his part in the Inchon landing on September 15, 1950, he was awarded the Bronze Star with Combat "V". For helping to rescue two wounded Marines four days later, he was awarded a Gold Star in lieu of a second Bronze Star Medal.

During the Battle of Chosin Reservoir in November 1950, Myers led 250 United Nations troops against 4,000 men, winning the fight. For this, he received the Medal of Honor, the nation's highest military decoration. He was presented the Medal of Honor by President Harry S. Truman during ceremonies at the White House on October 29, 1951. Although he emerged without injury from the Hagaru-ri engagement for which he earned the Medal of Honor, he was wounded in action on April 25, 1951.

== Post-Korea ==
Myers returned to the United States in June 1951. That August he reported to the Basic School, Marine Corps Schools, Quantico, as a battalion commander. While stationed at Quantico, he was promoted to lieutenant colonel in December 1951. Assigned next to Washington, D. C., Myers served as Inspector-Instructor of the 5th Special Infantry Battalion, USMCR, from September 1952 through August 1953; and Inspector-Instructor, 13th Infantry Battalion, USMCR, from September 1953 through July 1955. Following this assignment, he entered the Senior School at Marine Corps Schools, Quantico, and completed the course in June 1956. Myers remained at Quantico until April 1958, serving as commanding officer, Headquarters and Service Battalion, and executive officer, Basic School, respectively.

From July 1958 until August 1961, Myers was assigned as assistant naval attache at the American Embassy in London, England. During this assignment, he was promoted to colonel in July 1960. In September 1961, Myers was assigned to the Office of the Chief of Naval Operations, serving as head, International Plans Section, Strategic Plans Division, until June 1963. The following month, he joined the 3rd Marine Division on Okinawa for duty as troop exercise coordinator until June 1964. Upon his return to the United States, he completed the Industrial College of the Armed Forces in July 1965. He received his Master of Science degree in business administration from The George Washington University in September 1965. Myers was assigned duty at Headquarters Marine Corps with the G–L Division in August 1965. He served briefly as director, Marine Corps Personnel Research and Analysis Office, then as executive officer to the assistant chief of staff, G–L.

Myers retired from active duty in the Marine Corps on May 1, 1967. He died on October 23, 2005 in Jupiter, Florida, and was buried in Arlington National Cemetery, Arlington, Virginia.

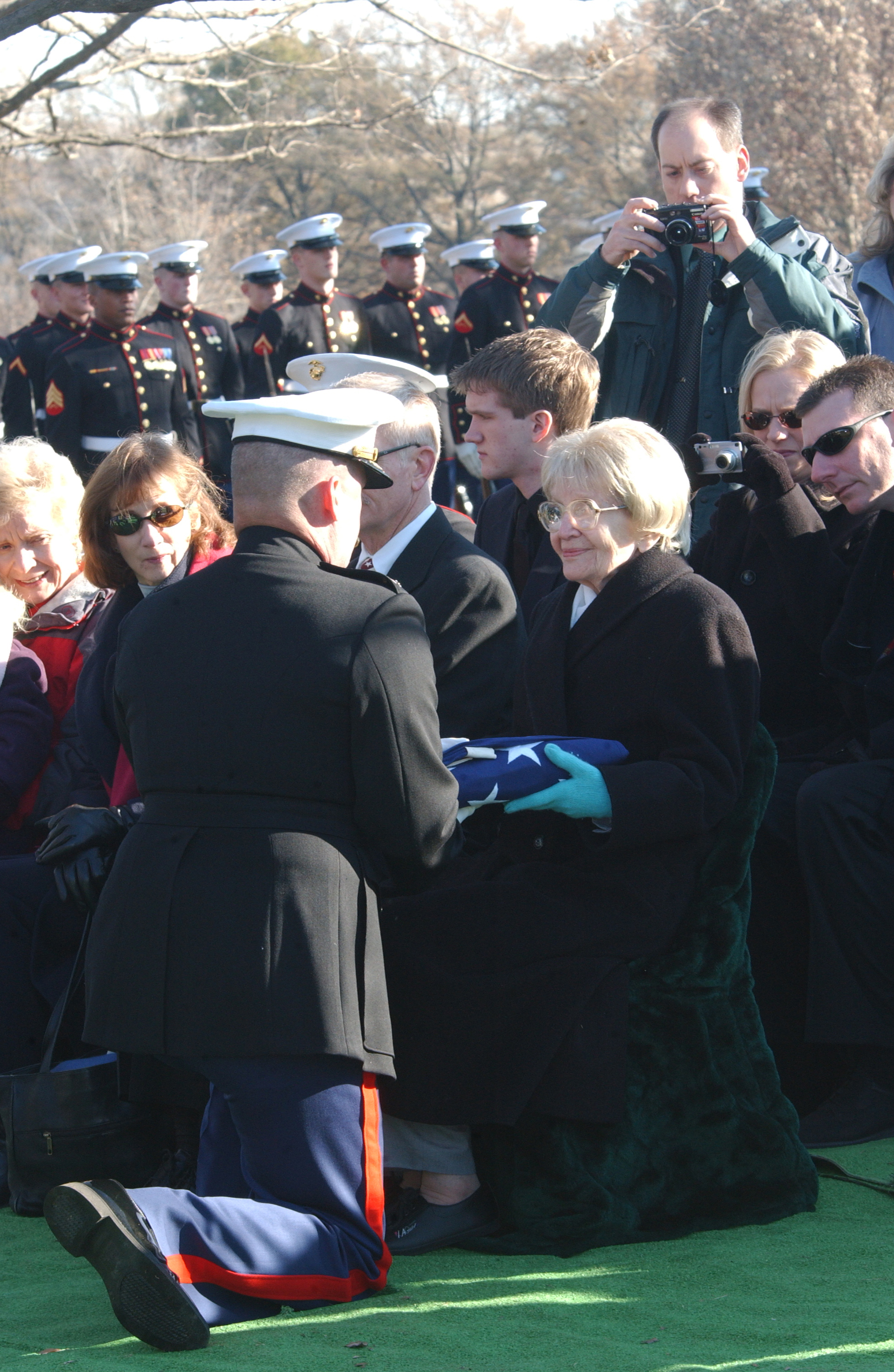
Colonel James D. Turlip of Headquarters Marine Corps presents a flag to Margaret Myers, wife of Colonel Reginald R. Myers (ret.) laid to rest at Arlington National Cemetery on December 21, 2005

== Medal of Honor citation ==
The President of the United States takes pleasure in presenting the MEDAL OF HONOR to

MAJOR REGINALD R. MYERS
UNITED STATES MARINE CORPS

for service as set forth in the following CITATION:

For conspicuous gallantry and intrepidity at the risk of his life above and beyond the call of duty as Executive Officer of the Third Battalion, First Marines, First Marine Division (Reinforced), in action against enemy aggressor forces in Korea on November 29, 1950. Assuming command of a composite unit of Army and Marine service and headquarters elements totalling approximately 250 men, during a critical stage in the vital defense of the strategically important military base at Hagaru-ri, Major Myers immediately initiated a determined and aggressive counterattack against a well-entrenched and clearly concealed enemy force numbering an estimated 4,000. Severely handicapped by a lack of trained personnel and experienced leaders in his valiant efforts to regain maximum ground prior to daylight, he persisted in constantly exposing himself to intense, accurate and sustained hostile fire in order to direct and supervise the employment of his men and to encourage and spur them on in pressing the attack. Inexorably moving forward up the steep, snow-covered slope with his depleted group in the face of apparently insurmountable odds, he concurrently directed artillery and mortar fire with superb skill and, although losing 170 of his men during fourteen hours of raging combat in sub-zero temperatures, continued to reorganize his unit and spearhead the attack which resulted in 600 enemy killed and 500 wounded. By his exceptional and valorous leadership throughout, Major Myers contributed directly to the success of his unit in restoring the perimeter. His resolute spirit of self sacrifice and unfaltering devotion to duty enhance and sustain the highest traditions of the United States Naval Service.

/S/ HARRY S. TRUMAN

== Awards and Decorations ==
Colonel Myers received the following awards for his service

1st row	Medal of Honor	Legion of Merit	Bronze Star Medal with "V" Device and 5/16 inch star
2nd row	Purple Heart	Navy Commendation Medal with "V" Device	Combat Action Ribbon with 5/16 inch star
3rd row	Navy Presidential Unit Citation with 3 Service stars	China Service Medal	American Defense Service Medal
4th row	American Campaign Medal	Asiatic-Pacific Campaign Medal with 11 Campaign stars	World War II Victory Medal
5th row	Navy Occupation Service Medal	National Defense Service Medal with 1 Service star	Korean Service Medal with 5 Campaign stars
6th row	Korean Presidential Unit Citation	United Nations Service Medal Korea	Korean War Service Medal Retroactively Awarded, 2003

== Medal of Honor flag presentation ==
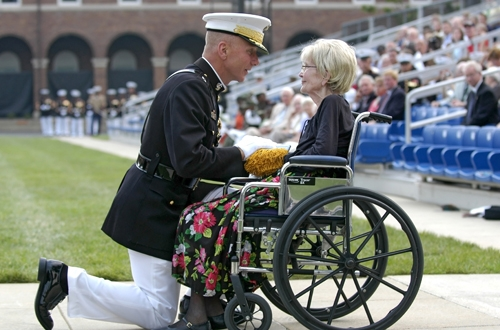
Commandant of the Marine Corps General Hagee presents the Medal of Honor flag to Myers' widow, Margaret Myers. (August 3, 2006)

On August 3, 2006, in a ceremony at the Marine barracks in Washington, D.C., General Michael Hagee presented the Medal of Honor flag to Myers' widow.

== See also ==
- List of Medal of Honor recipients
- List of Korean War Medal of Honor recipients
- Battle of Chosin Reservoir
