= Battle of Hwacheon =

Battle of the Korean War

- Part of the Chinese Spring Offensive in the Korean War
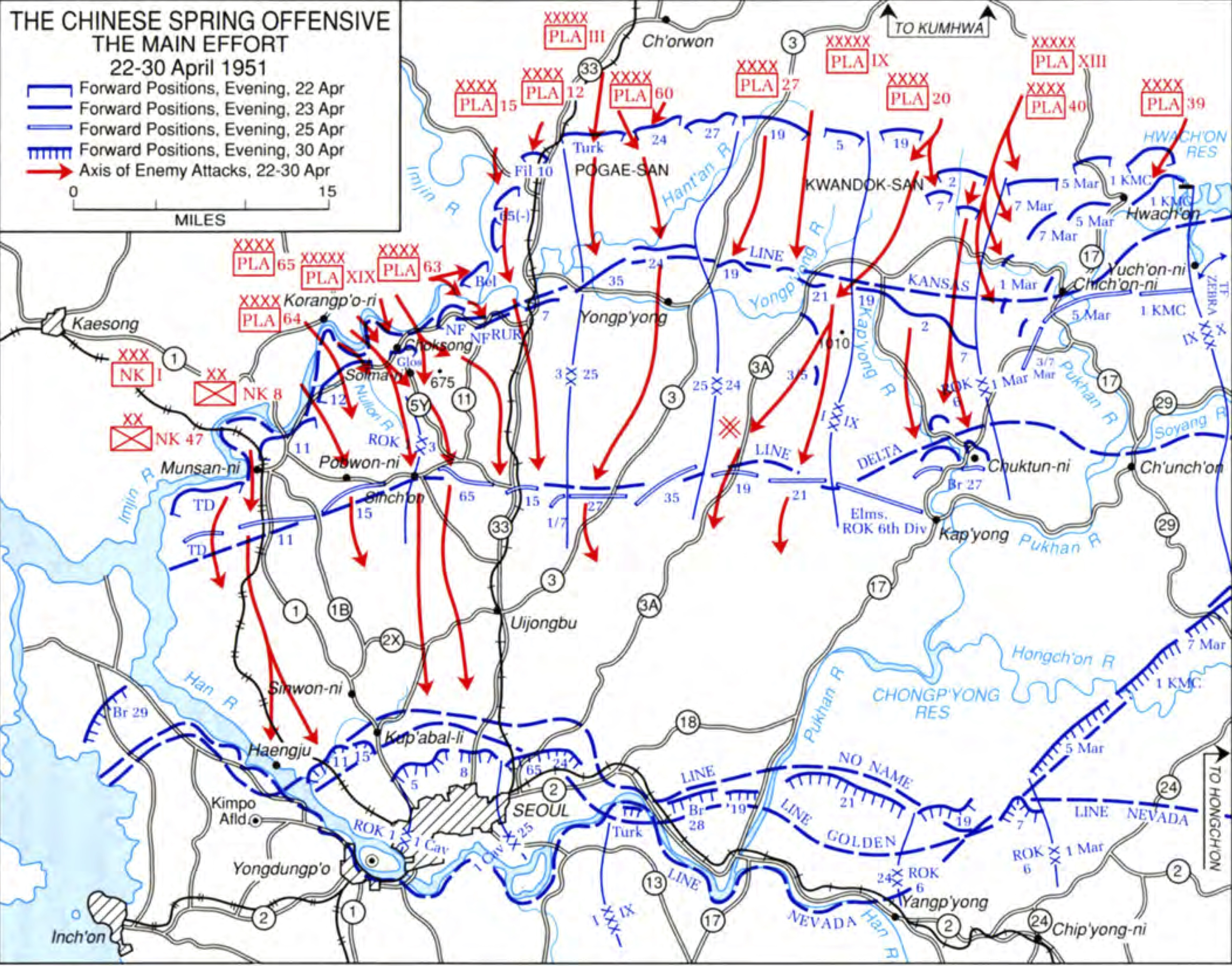
- map of the Chinese Spring offensive with Battle of Hwacheon area at right
Date	22–26 April 1951
Location	west of Hwacheon, South Korea
Result	UN victory

Belligerents
United Nations: United States; South Korea	China

Commanders and leaders
General Oliver P. Smith; General Gerald C. Thomas	

Units involved
(United States) 1st Marine Division (First Republic of Korea) 1st Korean Marine Corps Regiment	120th Division

Casualties and losses
93 killed 10 missing	24 killed

The Battle of Hwacheon was fought between 22 and 26 April 1951 during the Korean War between United Nations Command (UN) and Chinese forces during the Chinese Spring Offensive. The US 1st Marine Division successfully defended their positions and then withdrew under fire to the No-Name Line.

== Background ==
In mid-April 1951 UN forces in the central front in Korea were engaged in Operation Dauntless to advance UN positions from the Kansas Line 2–6 miles (3.2–9.7 km) north of the 38th Parallel to positions 10–20 miles (16–32 km) north of the 38th Parallel designated the Wyoming Line which would threaten the Chinese People's Volunteer Army (PVA) and North Korean Korean People's Army (KPA) logistics hub marked out by the towns of Pyonggang, Ch'orwon and Kumhwa named the Iron Triangle. The advance by US I and IX Corps was to menace the Triangle, not invest it and if struck by strong enemy attacks during or after the advance, the two Corps were to return to the Kansas Line.

US Eighth Army intelligence on 18 April warned that a PVA/KPA attack was likely any time between 20 April and 1 May, but on 21 April Eighth Army commander General James Van Fleet decided to continue the Dauntless advance.

Leading the IX Corps' advance were the Republic of Korea Army (ROK) 6th Division and the US 1st Marine Division. In their sector the Wyoming Line curved southeast from the Kumhwa area to the Hwacheon Reservoir. On 21 April the two divisions moved 2–5 miles (3.2–8.0 km) above the Kansas Line against almost no opposition. The absence of opposition in the IX Corps' zone only confirmed the recent patrol reports of PVA/KPA withdrawal.

On the 21st, the Eighth Army G-2 (intelligence officer) reported that his information still was not firm enough to "indicate the nearness" of the impending enemy offensive with any degree of certainty. A worrisome fact, as he earlier had pointed out to Van Fleet, was that a lack of offensive signs did not necessarily mean that the opening of the offensive was distant. In preparing past attacks, PVA forces had successfully concealed their locations until they moved into forward assembly areas immediately before they attacked.

Aerial reconnaissance after daybreak on 22 April, reported a general forward displacement of enemy formations from rear assemblies northwest of I Corps and north of both I and IX Corps, also extensive troop movements, both north and south, on the roads above Yanggu and Inje east of the Hwacheon Reservoir. Though air strikes punished the moving troops bodies, air observers reported the southward march of enemy groups with increasing frequency during the day. On the basis of the sightings west of the Hwacheon Reservoir, it appeared that the enemy forces approaching I Corps would mass evenly across the Corps' front while those moving toward IX Corps would concentrate on the front of the ROK 6th Division.

On 22 April, as I and IX Corps continued their advance toward the Wyoming Line. The progress of the attack resembled that on the previous day, IX Corps' forces making easy moves of 2–3 miles (3.2–4.8 km), the two I Corps divisions being limited to shorter gains by heavier resistance. On the east flank of the advance, the Hwacheon Dam, defended so stoutly by PVA 39th Army forces only a few days earlier, fell to the 1st Korean Marine Corps Regiment (1st KMC) without a fight. But a PVA captive taken elsewhere in the 1st Marine Division zone during the afternoon told interrogators that an attack would be opened before the day was out. In mid-afternoon the ROK 6th Division captured several members of the PVA 60th Division and, immediately west, the US 24th Infantry Division took captives from the PVA 59th Division. These two divisions belonged to the fresh 20th Army. The full IX Army Group had reached the front. In the US 25th Infantry Division zone on the west flank of the advance, six PVA who blundered into the hands of the Turkish Brigade along Route 33 during the afternoon were members of a survey party from the 2nd Motorized Artillery Division. The division's guns, according to the officer in charge, were being positioned to support an attack scheduled to start after dark.

== Battle ==
The first blows of the Chinese Spring Offensive on US IX Corps’ front were directed at the ROK 6th Division which simply evaporated as its frightened soldiers fled the field of battle. Facing only token resistance, the PVA 40th Army was on its way south in full gear by midnight. Soon, a 10 miles (16 km) penetration was created and the 1st Marine Division was in serious jeopardy. At 21:30 the duty officer at the 1st Marine Division command post was informed that the PVA had penetrated ROK defenses and were headed toward Marine lines. Not long after the message arrived the vanguard of a long line of demoralized ROK soldiers began filing in. By midnight, the Reconnaissance Company and the Military Police Company were rounding up stragglers and placing them under guard at the ferry site just south of the 5th Marine Regiment's command post. These soldiers reported the 6th Division was in full retreat and that thousands of enemy troops were rapidly moving south. Despite attempts to reconstitute the 6th Division as a fighting force, the 1st Marine Division's liaison officer called and said: “to all intents and purposes, the 6th ROK Division had ceased to exist.” This was alarming news because the Marine left flank was wide open, and the division's main supply route and all crossing points of the Pukhan River were at great risk. The first US troops to confirm the disaster on the left were cannoneers from Army artillery units that earlier had been sent west to support the ROK. Elements of the battered 987th Armored Field Artillery came pouring back into the Marine lines after being ambushed. The unit had lost about half of its 105 mm howitzers to the ambush, and the 2nd Rocket Artillery Battery lost all of its weapons when its defensive position was overrun. As Lieutenant colonel Leon F. Lavoie, commanding officer of the 92nd Armored Field Artillery Battalion acidly observed: "there had been more artillery lost in Korea up to that point than there was lost in the whole of the European theater in the last war by American forces."

By 22:24, the impact of the disaster on the left was apparent, so all plans to resume the Operation Dauntless attack the next day were abruptly canceled. Units along the forward edge of the battlefield were placed on full alert. Commanders hurriedly sent out combat patrols to locate the enemy and to try fix his line of march, while the Marines at the Main line of resistance dug in deep and nervously checked their weapons. In addition, General Oliver P. Smith ordered Colonel Robley E. West's 1st Battalion, 1st Marines, up from Chuncheon to tie in with the artillery and tanks located in the valley on the far west flank. West's battalion was soon on trucks headed for its new position, but the convoy could only creep along over roads choked with panic-stricken ROK soldiers escaping the battle zone. Captain John F. Coffey's Company B led the way. At about 01:30, while still 1,000 yards (910 m) short of its assigned position, the long column of vehicles stopped at the tight perimeter formed by the 92nd Armored Field Artillery Battalion, which a short time before had established a roadblock, collected more than 1,800 ROK, and attempted by machine gun and bayonet with little success to deploy them to slow the PVA advance. Moving west, Coffey's company assisted in the extricating the 987th Artillery's 105 mm howitzers that were stuck in the mud. After as many guns as possible were freed, Coffey returned to friendly lines where the 1st Battalion was manning a wooded semi-circular ridge with Company A on the right, Company C in the center, and the 81 mm mortars of Weapons Company on relatively level ground in the immediate rear. Company B was promptly assigned the battalion left flank. The PVA began probing Marine lines around 23:00 on 22 April and then mounted an all-out assault to turn the Marine flanks about three hours later. The 7th Marine Regiment on the left was the hardest hit unit. PVA mortar, automatic weapons, and small arms fire began at about 02:00 on the 23rd. This reconnaissance by fire was followed by a very determined ground assault an hour later. Shrieking whistles, clanging cymbals, and blasting bugles signaled the onslaught. At least 2,000 PVA troops hit the 1st Battalion, 7th Marines, full force. That attack by the PVA 358th Regiment, 120th Division, primarily directed at Company C and Company A, was repulsed by hand-to-hand fighting that lasted almost until dawn. Private First Class Herbert A. Littleton, a radioman with the forward observer team attached to Company C, was standing the mid-watch when the PVA appeared. He sounded the alarm then moved to an exposed position from which he adjusted supporting arms fires despite fierce incoming machine gun fire and showers of PVA grenades. Forced back into a bunker by enemy fire, Littleton threw himself upon a grenade to save his comrades in that crowded space at the cost of his own life. He was awarded a posthumous Medal of Honor for his actions that night. Heavy fighting—much of it grenade duels and close quarters combat—lasted several hours. PVA mortar fire and small arms continued throughout the night and into the next day. As always, supporting arms were a critical Marine advantage. The 11th Marine Regiment ringed the endangered position with artillery fire, and Marine tanks successfully guarded the lowland approaches. In the division's center, PVA infiltrators silently slipped through the 5th Marines’ outpost line to occupy Hill 313. A futile counterattack was quickly launched, but the assault platoon was held in check and suffered heavy casualties. It was not until the next morning that elements of the 1st and 2nd Battalions, 5th Marines, retook the hill.

At around 03:00, the 1st KMC on the right came under heavy attack in the vicinity of Hill 509 (38.159°N 127.76°E). The Koreans threw back successive PVA attacks throughout the long night and had ejected the PVA by the next morning. Particularly hard hit was a single rifle company holding the left flank. The 150-man company was reduced to only about 40 men ready for duty by daylight. The timely arrival of the reserve 1st Battalion, 1st Marines, eased the pressure on 1/7 Marines, and solidified the division west flank, but fierce fighting continued into the next morning. The PVA, well aware that they would be pounded from the air during the day, hurriedly retreated at dawn. Eight Marine F4U Corsairs swooped over the battlefield guided onto their targets by aerial observers flying vulnerable OY observation aircraft; VMF-323 flew in support of the 5th Marines while VMF-214 attacked the PVA in the 7th Marines’ zone. PVA casualties by all arms were estimated to be well above 2,000 men. By noon on the 23rd, it was obvious the Marines had won the first round, but it was also obvious that the fight was far from over. For his leadership in securing the division's vital flank, 1/7 Marines commander, Lieutenant colonel Webb D. Sawyer was awarded a Navy Cross.

Although the Marines held fast and remained a breakwater that stemmed the onrushing PVA, they were still pouring through ROK lines and "The position of the 1st Marine Division was beginning to appear to some persons, very similar to the situation at the Chosin Reservoir." On the Marine left a deep envelopment threatened. As a result, IX Corps' commander General William M. Hoge ordered the 1st Marine Division to fall back. Consequently, Smith passed the word for his units to retire to new defensive positions on the Pendleton Line at 09:35. The PVA threat was so great that Smith was forced to place the entire 1st Marine Division on the high ground north of the Chuncheon Corridor to protect the vital Mujon Bridge and several ferry crossings. This was a bold move because the Marines would have an unfordable river at their back and there was no division reserve in place. It also required a complex set of maneuvers whereby the Marines would have to defend the Pukhan River line, and at the same time move back to Chuncheon. Smith would have to carefully coordinate his supporting arms as well as effect a passage of lines under fire. Air and artillery would keep the PVA at bay while armor and the division's heavy weapons protected the avenues of approach and the river crossings. Smith's plan was to give ground rapidly in the north while slowly pulling back in the south, letting his westernmost units alternately pass through a series of blocking positions. Engineers would finally blow the bridges once the rearguard made it over the river. All hands were called upon to contribute during this fighting withdrawal. Cooks, bakers, and typists, even a downed pilot, were soon shouldering M1 rifles or carrying stretchers under fire. Just as at the Chosin Reservoir, the creed that "every Marine is a rifleman regardless of his military occupational specialty" saved the day. Smith wanted to form a semi-circular defense line that arched southwest atop key ground from the tip of the Hwacheon Reservoir west for a few miles then bending back along the high ground abutting the Pukhan River and overlooking the Chuncheon Valley. To do this he immediately ordered the rest of the 1st Marines forward from Chuncheon to hold the hills in the southwest while in the north he instituted a "swinging gate" maneuver whereby the Korean Marines anchored the far right, the 5th gave ground in the center and the 7th Marines pulled back in echelon to link up with the 1st Marine Regiment.

Fighting continued throughout the day. In the west, the 7th Marines had its own 3rd Battalion and the attached 1/1 Marines, to cover the withdrawal. The hard-hit 1st Battalion pulled back covered by fires from the 2nd Battalion. 3/7 Marines, seized some fiercely held high ground while 1/1 Marines, fought off repeated PVA probes that lasted until nightfall. Units of the 1st Marines held the southernmost positions. The remaining two reserve battalions had moved out of their assembly areas that morning, crossed the Pukhan River, then occupied a pair of hills protecting the main supply route and several crossing points. Actually, the arrival of the 2nd and 3rd Battalions, 1st Marines, was a close run thing. The Marines had to virtually race up the hills to beat the PVA who were also on the way to take what was obviously the most important terrain feature in the area. Hill 902 (actually a 4,000 feet (1,200 m) mountain top) (38.019°N 127.545°E) dominated the road to Chuncheon and protected the concrete Mojin Bridge as well as two ferry sites. Its defense became the focal point of the Marine withdrawal. In the center, 5th Marines moved back under scattered small arms and mortar fire, but encountered no PVA ground units. On the division right, the 1st KMC pulled back and then dug in just before being ranged by PVA mortar and artillery fire. Unfortunately, the 1st Marine Division's line was fragmented, not continuous, with units of the 1st and 7th Marines holding widely separated battalion-sized perimeters located atop key terrain. The 11th Marines, reinforced by several Army artillery battalions, was busy registering defensive fires as night fell on 23 April. That day also marked the first mass helicopter medical evacuation in history. All of VMO-6's HTL-4 helicopters were airborne at first light. Fifty critically wounded men were flown out between 06:00 and 19:30. A total of 21 sorties (22.6 flight hours) were made from Chuncheon to the front lines then back to the 1st Medical Battalion collecting and clearing station. Every flight encountered some type of PVA fire, but there were no losses of aircraft or personnel. The final flight had to be guided in with handheld lights because the airfield had been officially blacked out. Ground personnel and flying officers alike were formed into provisional platoons and assigned defense sectors in case the PVA broke through, and all excess material and equipment was loaded on trucks for movement back to Hongcheon that night.

On the night of 23-24 April, the 1st Marines caught the brunt of the PVA 120th Division attack. In the north, 1/1 Marines, still under the operational control of Colonel Herman Nickerson Jr.'s 7th Marines, was dug in on Horseshoe Ridge (38.058°N 127.596°E). This was a key position which, if lost, would split the 1st Marine Division wide open and allow the PVA to defeat it in detail. Farther south, the 2nd and 3rd Battalions, 1st Marines, manned separate perimeters on Hill 902 overlooking the flat lands of the Chuncheon Corridor. These positions constituted the last line of defense, and if they were lost the division would be surrounded and cut off. The Marines were hit by artillery, mortar, small arms, and automatic weapons fire all through the night. The 1st and 7th Marines on the left flank were probed as PVA forces searched for crew-served weapons positions and weak spots in the line. The four-hour fight for Horseshoe Ridge began at about 20:00. There, the men of the 1st Battalion, 1st Marines, managed to blunt an attack by the PVA 358th Regiment in savage hand-to-hand fighting. Farther north, 3/7 Marines, repelled PVA probes all night long. As part of that action, the Army's 92nd Armored Field Artillery Battalion repelled a dawn ground attack using machine guns and direct fire artillery to eliminate several hundred PVA troops, while continuing to deliver fire for the Marines on Horseshoe Ridge. Marine M26 Pershings from the 1st Tank Battalion eventually joined the 92nd Battalion, scattering the PVA with deadly flat-trajectory fire. PVA stragglers were cleared out by joint Army-Marine patrols before the Army artillerymen displaced to new positions.

The PVA's main thrust that night, however, was directed farther south where they tried to turn the open Marine flank, but instead ran headlong into 3/1 Marines, atop Hill 902. A series of full-scale assaults began at about midnight. The PVA 359th and 360th Regiments repeatedly hit the 3rd Battalion's exposed perimeter, but all efforts to eject the determined defenders were unsuccessful. After PVA mortars pounded Banning's Marines for several hours a "human wave" ground assault almost cracked Company G. That this did not happen was a tribute to the actions of Technical Sergeant Harold E. Wilson. Despite being wounded on four separate occasions, he refused evacuation and remained in command of his platoon. Unable to man a weapon because of painful shoulder wounds, Wilson repeatedly exposed himself to PVA fire while distributing ammunition and directing tactical movements even though he was hit several more times. Wilson was later awarded the Medal of Honor for his leadership that night. The Marines took heavy casualties during fierce hand-to-hand fighting, but the PVA were unable to dislodge them. At 09:30 on 24 April, the battered Marines were almost out of ammunition and their ranks had been severely thinned, but they held their positions. The PVA plan to trap and annihilate the 1st Marine Division had been a costly failure.

Hoge ordered the Marines to pull back to the Kansas Line as part of a general realignment of IX Corps. This would not be an easy maneuver because it would require disengaging under fire and making several river crossings. To do this, Smith had to restore tactical unity prior to movement. The 1st Marines was reunited on the morning of the 24th when 1/1 Marines, which had been hotly engaged while attached to the 7th Marines for the past few days, rejoined the regiment. Concurrently, 3/1 Marines, conducted a fighting withdrawal protected by Marine, Navy and Air Force air strikes and artillery fire by Marine and Army units. The battered 3rd Battalion passed through the 2nd Battalion and then both units fought their way back to the high ground covering the river crossing. The regiment was under continuous fire during the entire movement and suffered numerous casualties en route. At the same time, 3/7 Marines, set up farther south on Hill 696 to defend the Chuncheon-Kapyong road as well as the southern ferry sites. This key position, the southernmost high ground, dominated the Chuncheon Corridor and the Pukhan River and would be one of the last positions vacated. On the right, the 5th Marines and the 1st KMC pulled back harassed by only scattered resistance. The resultant shortening of the division front allowed Smith to pull the 7th Marines out of the lines and use it as the division reserve. By the evening of 24 April, the 1st Marine Division's lines resembled a fishhook with the 1st KMC at the eye in the north, the 5th Marines forming the shank and the 1st Marines at the curved barb in the south. The 7th Marines, less the 3rd Battalion, was charged with rear area security and its 1st and 2nd Battalions were positioned to protect river crossings along the route to Chuncheon as well as the town itself.

The 1st Marines again bore the brunt of PVA probes on the night of 24-25 April, but accurate close-in fires by 105 mm and 155 mm howitzers kept potential attackers at a distance. The 2nd Battalion repelled a PVA company in the only major action of the evening. The PVA were still lurking in the west as became evident when patrols departing friendly lines in that area quickly struck a PVA hornet's nest the following morning. One such patrol was pinned down less than 200 yards (180 m) from friendly lines. Another platoon suffered 18 casualties and had to be extricated from an ambush by tanks. On the other hand, 5th Marines and 1st KMC scouts ventured 1 mile (1.6 km) to the north without contact. Air and artillery plastered the western flank, but PVA machine gun, mortar, and artillery fire continued to hit Marine positions. In the 1st Marines’ zone PVA gunners found the 3rd Battalion command post, wounding the Regimental commander, Colonel McAlister; the Battalion commander, Lieutenant colonel Banning; the executive officer; and Major Trompeter, the operations officer. Banning and the executive officer had to be evacuated, and Trompeter took over the battalion. McAlister refused evacuation and remained in command of the regiment. It was obvious the PVA were biding their time until they could gather enough strength for another try at the Marine lines. There was continual pressure, but the 11th Marines' artillery harassment and interdiction fires, direct fire by Marine tanks, and an air umbrella prevented a major assault. PVA action was limited to only a few weak probes and a handful of mortar rounds as the Marines moved back. The 1st Marine Division reached the modified Kansas Line in good order. Despite suffering more than 300 casualties in the last 48 hours, the Marines handled everything the PVA threw at them and still held a firm grip on the IX Corps' right flank when the PVA offensive ground to a halt.

During this very brief break in the action a new division commander took over. Major general Gerald C. Thomas became the 1st Marine Division's commanding general at a small ceremony attended by the few available staff members on the afternoon of 25 April. Despite the hurried nature of the command change and the fact that it occurred in the midst of a complex combat action, the transition was a smooth one that did not hinder operations. The first order Thomas received was to pull the 1st Marine Division back to a new position where Korean laborers were toiling night and day to construct a defensive bulwark. The Marine movement was no isolated withdrawal. All across the front, the UN forces were breaking contact in order to man a new main line of resistance known as the No-Name Line. This unpressured retrograde marked a radical change in UN tactics. Upon taking command of Eighth Army in December 1950 General Matthew Ridgway adopted mobile defensive tactics to deal with enemy attacks. Instead of "hold your ground at all cost," he instituted a "roll-with-the-punches" scheme whereby UN units traded ground to inflict punishment. To do this Ridgway insisted that his troops always maintain contact with both the enemy and adjoining friendly forces during retrograde movements. This time, however, Van Fleet decided to completely break contact. He opted to pull back as much as 20 miles (32 km) in places. There, from carefully selected positions, his troops could trap exposed attackers in preplanned artillery kill zones at the same time air power pummeled ever-lengthening enemy supply routes. In hindsight, this combined-arms approach fully utilized UN strengths while exploiting enemy weaknesses, but at the time it befuddled many Marines to have to abandon hard-earned ground when there seemed to be no serious enemy threat. Such was the case when the 1st Marine Division was told to fall back to a section of the No-Name Line located near Hongcheon far to the south. This movement would be done in two stages. The first leg of the journey was back to Chuncheon where the rifle units would cover the support units as they pulled out. When that was accomplished the combat units would continue on to the No-Name Line. There was no significant enemy interference with either move. The initial departure began at 11:30 on 26 April. The 5th Marines and 1st KMC retired first, followed by 1st Marines, with 3/7 Marines, attached. A curtain of close air support supplemented by rocket and artillery fires shrouded these movements. All units, except the rearguard, were safely across the meandering Pukhan River before dark. The last remaining bridge across the chest-deep river was blown up at 19:00, forcing 2/1 Marines and 3/7 Marines, to wade across the chilly barrier in the middle of the night. The movement back to Chuncheon was completed by noon, and the Marines took up defensive positions along the southern banks of the Soyang River on the afternoon of the 27th without incident. The only enemy encountered during the pull-back was one bewildered PVA straggler who had inadvertently fallen in with the Marine column in the darkness.

On 28 April, the second phase of the withdrawal began. The Marine withdrawal was again unpressured, but it took three days to finish the move south due to serious transportation problems. Finally, on 30 April, the Marines settled in at the No-Name Line with the 5th Marines on the left, the 1st KMC in the center, the 1st Marines on the right and the 7th Marines in reserve. The month of April cost the Marines 933 casualties (93 killed, 830 wounded, and 10 missing), most lost during the offensive. The PVA enjoyed some local successes, but overall their attacks fell far short of expectations. Operation Dauntless had been stopped in its tracks, but what little ground the PVA gained had been purchased at a fearful cost; the PVA lost an estimated 70,000 men. The headlong UN retreat the Chinese expected did not materialize. This time there was no "bug out". Instead, most breaks in the line were quickly sealed, and the UN was holding firm at the No-Name Line. By the last day of April, it was apparent to both sides that the PVA/KPA would not be parading through the streets of Seoul on May Day as their leaders had promised.

== Aftermath ==
The first days of May were so quiet that no Marine patrols made contact. This temporary lull, however, was about to end because a second phase of the offensive was aimed at eastern Korea. To meet this threat, Van Fleet redeployed his command. As part of this reorganization the 1st Marine Division was taken from IX Corps and was once again assigned to Major General Edward M. Almond's X Corps. This was easy to do because the 1st Marine Division was located on the IX and X Corps boundary, which was simply shifted about 12 miles (19 km) west, and only one battalion of the 5th Marines had to actually move.

The next two weeks were devoted primarily to improving defensive positions, but some tactical issues came to the fore. Thomas was particularly disturbed by two Eighth Army orders. First, the 1st Marine Division was told to establish an "outpost line of resistance" to maintain contact with the enemy, provide early warning of a major attack, and delay the enemy advance as long as possible. Second, the 11th Marines was ordered to shoot a unit of fire each day whether there were observed targets or not. Thomas felt he could adequately cover his zone of action using aerial observation and long-range reconnaissance patrols, so he protested the placement of an entire battalion outside of 105 mm artillery range. When told that the post must be manned, Thomas requested that an entire regiment be located at the exposed position. When this request was granted, he sent Nickerson's 7th Marines onto some high ground overlooking the Chuncheon Valley with orders to keep the road open and be prepared to fight its way out if the PVA came down in force. Thomas also protested that shooting a unit of fire each day was a wasteful practice, one that would surely cause an ammunition shortage sooner or later. He was overruled in this case.

The expected second phase of the offensive fell upon ROK units in the east on 16 May with the start of the Battle of the Soyang River, and soon a 30 miles (48 km) penetration threatened the US 2nd Infantry Division on the Marine right. That night PVA forces entered the Marine zone in regimental strength where the 5th Marines and the 1st KMC had several company-sized patrol bases well north of the main line of resistance in the left and center sections respectively. To the right, Nickerson's 7th Marines had its 1st Battalion patrolling the Chuncheon Road, 2nd Battalion manning the outpost and the 3rd Battalion, holding Morae Kogae Pass, a vital link on the road leading from the forward edge of the battle area back to the main front line. Well aware that whoever controlled the pass controlled the road, the PVA made Morae Kogae a key objective. Under cover of darkness, they carefully slipped in behind the 1st KMC and headed straight for the pass, which they apparently thought was unguarded. The assault force unexpectedly bumped into the northern sector of the 7th Marines perimeter at about 03:00 and a furious fight broke out. Within minutes the 11th Marines built up a wall of fire at the same time the infantry initiated their final protective fires. Burning tracer rounds crisscrossed all avenues of approach and exploding shells flashed in the night as Marine artillery pinned the PVA in place from the rear while Marine riflemen shot them down from the front. In spite of this the PVA closed in on the position. Amid the fierce hand-to-hand fighting a counterattack threw the PVA back out of Company I's lines. The critical battle for the pass did not end until daybreak when the PVA vainly tried to pull back, but were instead caught in the open by Marine artillery, mortars, and some belated air strikes. The PVA lost an estimated 530 men. By actual count, they left behind 112 dead, 82 prisoners, and a wealth of abandoned weapons that included recoilless rifles, mortars, machine guns and a 76mm antitank gun. Marine losses were seven dead and 19 wounded.

The following day, 18 May, the 1st Marine Division readjusted defensive dispositions that allowed the US 2nd Infantry Division to move east to reinforce its right flank which was bearing the brunt of the new PVA offensive. The 7th Marines pulled back to the No-Name Line to relieve the 1st Marines which then sidestepped east to take over an area previously held by the US 9th Infantry Regiment and the 5th Marines swung over from the far left flank to relieve the 38th Infantry Regiment on the extreme right. By noon on the 19th, all four regiments (1st KMC, 7th Marines, 1st Marines and 5th Marines) were aligned from left to right on the modified No-Name Line as the PVA's offensive lost its momentum.

The final action of the Chinese Spring Offensive occurred at about 04:45 on 20 May when 3rd Battalion, 5th Marines, caught elements of the PVA 44th Division in the open. The Marines on the firing line opened up with everything they had directing rockets, artillery and air support during a five-hour battle that cost the PVA 152 dead and 15 prisoners. This action marked the end of the offensive. The PVA, short of men and supplies after the previous month's heavy combat, had finally run out of steam and was now vulnerable. With the offensive successfully blunted, Van Fleet was ready to shift back into an offensive mode to exploit what was clearly a devastating PVA/KPA defeat beginning the UN May-June 1951 counteroffensive on 20 May. The UN forces had come through the last month with relatively light casualties and for the most part had only ceded territory on their own terms.
