= William A. Foster =

U.S. Marine (1915–1945)

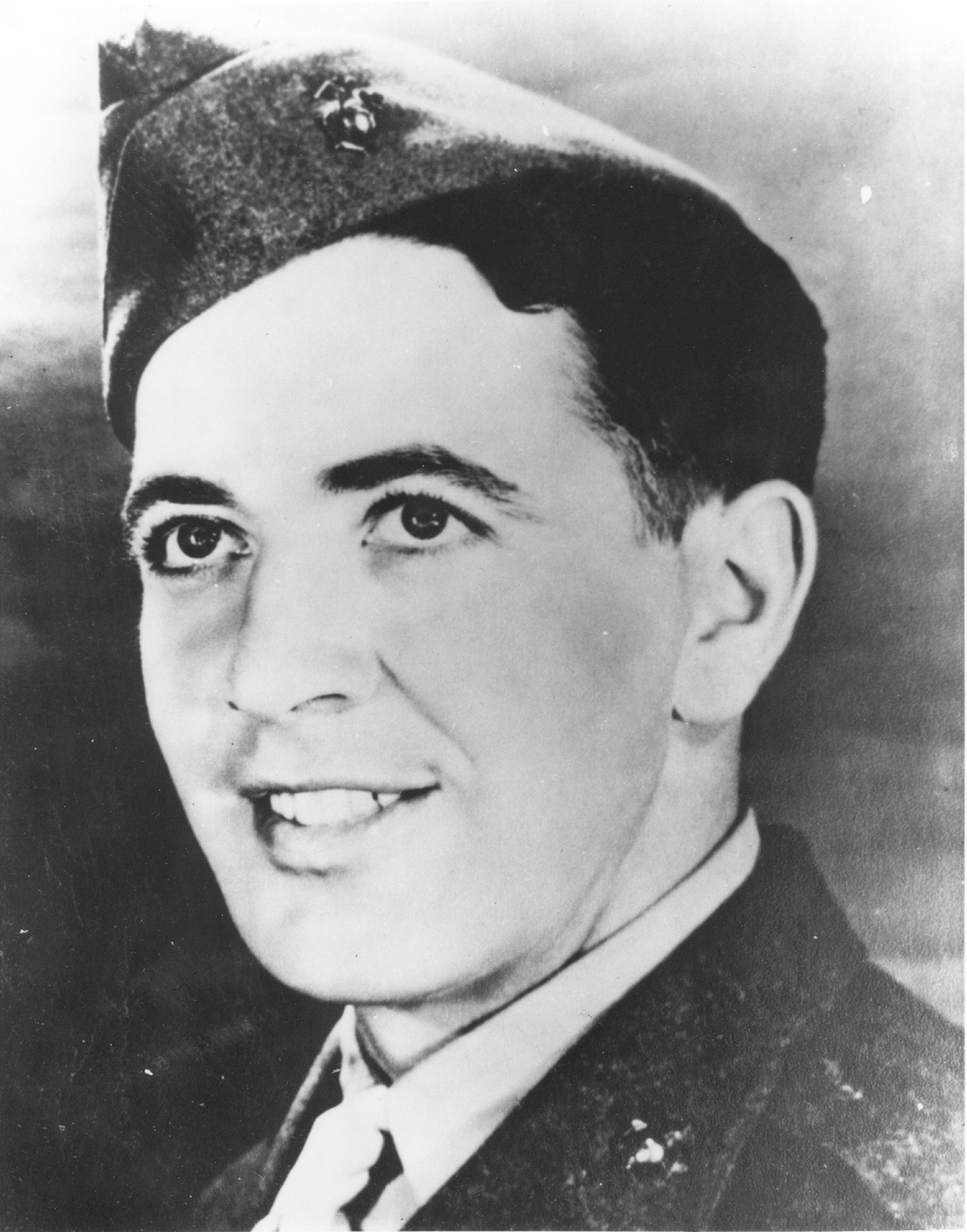
- William A. Foster, Medal of Honor recipient
- Born: William Adelbert Foster; February 17, 1915; Garfield Heights, Ohio, US
- Died: May 2, 1945 (aged 30); Okinawa, Japan
- Burial place: initially the 1st Marine Division cemetery, Okinawa; later re-interred in Calvary Cemetery, Cleveland, Ohio
- Military career
- Allegiance: United States
- Branch: United States Marine Corps
- Service years: (6 years Ohio National Guard); 1944–1945 (USMC)
- Rank: Private First Class
- Units: Company K, 3rd Battalion, 1st Marines, 1st Marine Division
- Conflicts: World War II: Battle of Okinawa †
- Awards: Medal of Honor (1945); Purple Heart

William Adelbert Foster (February 17, 1915 – May 2, 1945) was a United States Marine who received the Medal of Honor for his "conspicuous gallantry and intrepidity at the risk of his life above and beyond the call of duty" during World War II during the Battle of Okinawa in 1945.

== Early life ==
William Foster was born in Garfield Heights, Ohio on February 17, 1915. Following graduation from vocational high school, where he majored in machinist's subjects, he was employed as a planer and shaper at Cleveland's Star Machine and Tool Company. A veteran of six year's service in the Ohio National Guard, Foster was enlisted in the Marine Corps Reserve through the Selective Service System on April 1, 1944.

== Military service ==
Foster received his basic training at Marine Corps Recruit Depot San Diego, California. In late September 1944, after intensive combat training at Camp Pendleton, he embarked for overseas duty on board the USS General C. G. Morton bound for the Russell Islands in the Solomon group. There he joined his regular unit — Company K, 3rd Battalion 1st Marines, 1st Marine Division.

He landed with his unit during the Battle of Okinawa on Easter Sunday, April 1, 1945, the first anniversary of his enlistment in the Marine Corps. In combat for the first time at Okinawa, PFC Foster performed an act of heroism on May 2, 1945, which earned for him the nation's highest military decoration: the Medal of Honor.

Dug in with another Marine, he and his comrade engaged in a fierce hand grenade duel with infiltrating enemy soldiers. When a Japanese grenade landed beyond reach in their foxhole, Private First Class Foster, with complete disregard for his personal safety, dove on it and absorbed its full explosion with his own body, thus protecting the other Marine from serious injury. Miraculously, he survived the explosion. Mortally wounded, he handed his two remaining grenades to his comrade and said, "Make them count…" then was brought to medical care where he died of his injuries.

On August 19, 1946, Gen Alexander A. Vandegrift, then Commandant of the Marine Corps, presented the Medal of Honor to his parents in a ceremony at the City Hall in Cleveland. In the words of the accompanying citation, presented by President Harry S. Truman, "… he had unhesitatingly relinquished his own chance of survival that his fellow Marine might carry on the relentless fight against a fanatic enemy…"

Foster was initially interred in the 1st Marine Division cemetery on Okinawa. On March 5, 1949, his remains were reinterred in the Calvary Cemetery in Cleveland. His remaining family lives in and around the Cleveland area.

== Awards and honors ==
Foster's awards include:

1st row	Medal of Honor		
2nd row	Purple Heart	Combat Action Ribbon	Presidential Unit Citation
3rd row	American Campaign Medal	Asiatic-Pacific Campaign Medal with one campaign star	World War II Victory Medal

- Camp Foster, part of the Marine Corps Base Camp Smedley D. Butler complex on Okinawa, is named for Foster.
- In 1957, William Foster Elementary opened in his hometown of Garfield Heights. It publicly educates grades K-5.

=== Medal of Honor citation ===
The President of the United States takes pride in presenting the MEDAL OF HONOR posthumously to

PRIVATE FIRST CLASS WILLIAM A. FOSTER
UNITED STATES MARINE CORPS RESERVE

for service as set forth in the following CITATION:

For conspicuous gallantry and intrepidity at the risk of his life above and beyond the call of duty as a Rifleman with Company K, Third Battalion, First Marines, First Marine Division, in action against enemy Japanese forces on Okinawa Shima in the Ryūkyū Chain, May 2, 1945. Dug in with another Marine on the point of the perimeter defense after waging a furious assault against a strongly fortified Japanese position, Private First Class Foster and comrade engaged in a fierce hand grenade duel with infiltrating enemy soldiers. Suddenly an enemy grenade landed beyond reach in the foxhole. Instantly diving on the deadly missile, Private First Class Foster absorbed the exploding charge in his own body, thereby protecting the other Marine from serious injury. Although mortally wounded as a result of his heroic action, he quickly rallied, handed his own remaining two grenades to his comrade and said, "Make them count." Stouthearted and indomitable, he had unhesitatingly relinquished his own chance of survival that his fellow Marine might carry on the relentless fight against a fanatic enemy, and his dauntless determination, cool decision and valiant spirit of self-sacrifice in the face of certain death reflect the highest credit upon Private First Class Foster and in the United States Naval Service. He gallantly gave his life in the service of his country.

/S/ HARRY S. TRUMAN

== See also ==
- List of Medal of Honor recipients
- List of Medal of Honor recipients for World War II
