= Washington's Immortals =

Washington's Immortals: The Untold Story of an Elite Regiment Who Changed the Course of the Revolution
- First edition
- Author: Patrick K. O'Donnell
- Subject: 1st Maryland Regiment, a Continental Army regiment during the American Revolution
- Genre: History
- Publisher: Atlantic Monthly Press
- Publication date: 2016
- Pages: xiv, 463 pages, 16 unnumbered pages of plates
- ISBN: 978-0-8021-2459-3 (Hardcover)
- OCLC: 911364918
- LC Class: E263.M3 O36 2016

Washington's Immortals: The Untold Story of an Elite Regiment Who Changed the Course of the Revolution by Patrick K. O'Donnell chronicles the history of the 1st Maryland Regiment during the American Revolution.

== Critical responses ==
Publishers Weekly notes that O'Donnell "adeptly provides noteworthy thumbnails of both minor and major players, including American and British generals" and that readers interested in the history of the American Revolution will find it "interesting and informative".

The Washington Independent Review of Books describes O'Donnell's book as a "boots on the ground" account, designed for "readers who enjoy well-researched military history".
