= Harold E. Wilson =

United States Marine who earned Medal of Honor

Harold Edward Wilson
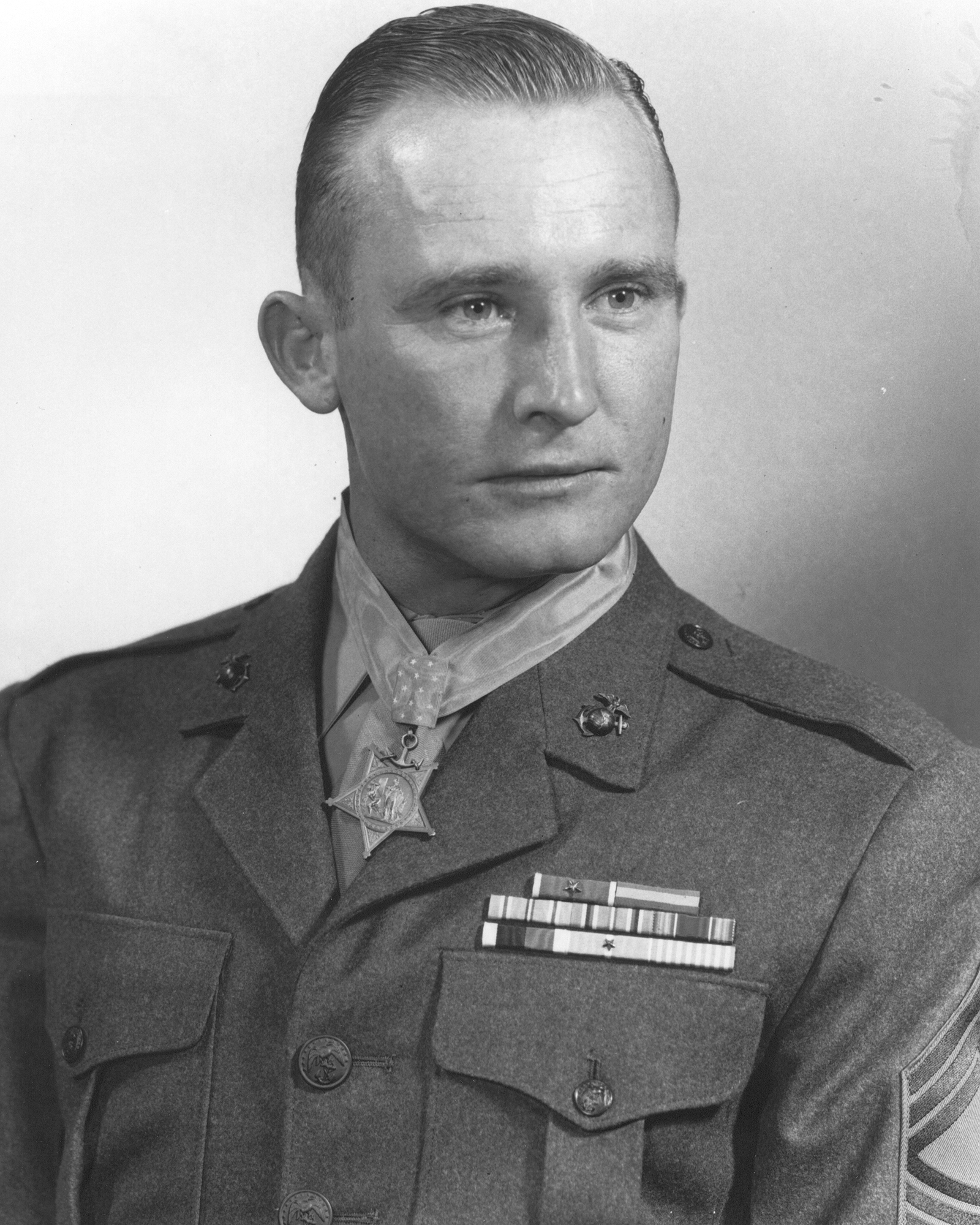
- Born: December 5, 1921; Birmingham, Alabama
- Died: March 29, 1998 (aged 76); Lexington, South Carolina
- Burial place: Woodridge Memorial Park, Lexington, South Carolina
- Military career
- Allegiance: United States
- Branch: United States Marine Corps
- Service years: 1942–1945; 1947–1972
- Rank: Chief warrant officer
- Units: 3rd Battalion 1st Marines; Marine Aircraft Group 13
- Conflicts: World War II; Korean War: Battle of Chosin Reservoir; Vietnam War
- Awards: Medal of Honor; Bronze Star Medal; Purple Heart (5)

Chief Warrant Officer Harold Edward Wilson (December 5, 1921 – March 29, 1998) was a United States Marine who earned the United States' military highest award, the Medal of Honor, for heroism as a platoon sergeant of a rifle platoon in Korea on the night of April 23–24, 1951 during the Battle of Hwacheon. He received the award from President Harry S. Truman during ceremonies at the White House on April 11, 1952.

Wounded four times during the night-long battle, he refused medical treatment to rally his men against overwhelming enemy forces. With both arms virtually disabled, he continued to pass ammunition to the hard-pressed Marines and moved from foxhole to foxhole aiding and encouraging his men. When the assault was finally broken, he accounted for each of his men before walking a half mile unassisted to an aid station.

A month earlier, he had earned the Bronze Star for "fearless and untiring leadership" of his platoon in several engagements from March 1–27, 1951. He was previously wounded on December 9, 1950, during the Battle of Chosin Reservoir.

== Marine Corps service ==
Harold Edward Wilson was born on December 5, 1921, in Birmingham, Alabama, and attended Central Park Elementary and Ensley High School. He enlisted in the Marine Corps Reserve and was assigned to active duty on April 20, 1942. During World War II, he served overseas for 27 months and was stationed on Midway Island. In addition to his Pacific service, he was stationed at Parris Island, South Carolina; Camp Lejeune, North Carolina; and Portsmouth, Virginia. He was honorably discharged on October 20, 1945, with the rank of sergeant.

Two years later, he re-entered the Organized Marine Corps Reserve, joining the Birmingham unit. Recalled to active duty in August 1950 after the outbreak of the Korean War, he was assigned to Company G, 3rd Battalion, 1st Marines, 1st Marine Division. Arriving with his unit in Korea in November 1950, he participated in the Wonsan landing, and later fought in the Battle of Chosin Reservoir and in the first United Nations counteroffensive. Following the April 23–24, 1951, action in which he was wounded and earned the Medal of Honor, he was evacuated to Yokosuka Naval Hospital in Japan and five months later returned to the United States. He was awarded a meritorious promotion to master sergeant in June 1951 and commissioned a warrant officer in August 1952. In December 1962, he assumed the post of adjutant at the Marine Corps Engineer Schools, Camp Lejeune, and the following December was assigned to Force Troops, Fleet Marine Force, Atlantic, serving as adjutant and personnel officer of the 2nd Tank Battalion.

Wilson was also a veteran of the Vietnam War, serving with Marine Aircraft Group 13 prior to being assigned as 6th Marine Corps District Personnel Officer in November 1968. He retired from the Marine Corps in February 1972.

Wilson died in Lexington, South Carolina on March 29, 1998. He is buried in Woodridge Memorial Park, Lexington, South Carolina.

== Medal of Honor citation ==
The President of the United States takes pleasure in presenting the MEDAL OF HONOR to

TECHNICAL SERGEANT HAROLD E. WILSON
UNITED STATES MARINE CORPS

for service as set forth in the following CITATION:

For conspicuous gallantry and intrepidity at the risk of his life above and beyond the call of duty while serving as Platoon Sergeant of a Rifle Platoon attached to Company G, Third Battalion, First Marines, First Marine Division (Reinforced), in action against enemy aggressor forces in Korea on the night of 23–24 April 1951. When the company outpost was overrun by the enemy while his platoon, firing from hastily-constructed foxholes, was engaged in resisting the brunt of a fierce mortar, machine-gun, grenade and small-arms attack launched by hostile forces from high ground under cover of darkness, Technical Sergeant Wilson braved intense fire to assist the survivors back into the line and to direct the treatment of casualties. Although twice wounded by gunfire, in the right arm and the left leg, he refused medical aid for himself and continued to move about among his men, shouting words of encouragement. After receiving further wounds in the head and shoulder as the attack increased in intensity, he again insisted upon remaining with his unit. Unable to use either arm to fire, and with mounting casualties among our forces, he resupplied his men with rifles and ammunition taken from the wounded. Personally reporting to his company commander on several occasions, he requested and received additional assistance when the enemy attack became even more fierce and, after placing the reinforcements in strategic positions in the line, directed effective fire until blown off his feet by the bursting of a hostile mortar round in his face. Dazed and suffering from concussion, he still refused medical aid and, despite weakness from loss of blood, moved from foxhole to foxhole, directing fire, resupplying ammunition, rendering first aid and encouraging his men. By his heroic actions in the face of almost certain death, when the unit's ability to hold the disadvantageous position was doubtful, he instilled confidence in his troops, inspiring them to rally repeatedly and turn back the furious assaults. At dawn, after the final attack had been repulsed, he personally accounted for each man in his platoon before walking unassisted one-half mile to the aid station where he submitted to treatment. His outstanding courage, initiative and skilled leadership in the face of overwhelming odds were contributing factors in the success of his company's mission and reflect the highest credit upon Technical Sergeant Wilson and the United States Naval Service /S/ HARRY S. TRUMAN

== Awards and Decorations ==
CWO Wilson received the following awards for his service

1st row	Medal of Honor		Bronze Star Medal with "V" Device
2nd row	Purple Heart with 4 5/16 inch stars	Navy Achievement Medal with "V" Device	Combat Action Ribbon with 5/16 inch star
3rd row	Navy Presidential Unit Citation with 1 Service star	Navy Unit Commendation	Navy Meritorious Unit Commendation
4th row	Marine Corps Good Conduct Medal	Selected Marine Corps Reserve Medal	Marine Corps Expeditionary Medal
5th row	American Campaign Medal	Asiatic-Pacific Campaign Medal	World War II Victory Medal
6th row	Navy Occupation Service Medal	National Defense Service Medal with 1 Service star	Korean Service Medal with 3 Campaign stars
7th row	Vietnam Service Medal with 2 Campaign stars	Korean Presidential Unit Citation	RVN Gallantry Cross Unit Citation
8th row	United Nations Service Medal Korea	Vietnam Campaign Medal	Korean War Service Medal Retroactively Awarded, 2003

== See also ==
- List of Korean War Medal of Honor recipients
