= Camp Horno =

U.S. Marine Corps base in California

Coordinates: 33.3770°N 117.4779°W

Camp Horno is a camp at Marine Corps Base Camp Pendleton in San Diego County, California. It is the home of the 1st Marine Regiment, sometimes known as "Inchon". As well as being home of MARSOC (Marine Special Operations Command). Camp Horno is predominantly a Marine infantry training area, other branch special operations forces also train at the camp. Camp Horno has earned the unofficial nick name "Grunt Land" by the infantry Marines, who are stationed there.

== History ==
The camp was built in 1950 at the start of the Korean War and named for the Spanish word for clay oven or kiln. Camp Horno initially consisted of Quonset huts that were typical housing for Marines until the 1970s. In 2008 four-story, 170-room barracks were built as part of a facilities renovation project. Parts of Katy Perry's "Part of Me" music video where shot at Camp Horno in 2012. Camp Horno is the frequent site of many Marine ceremonies due to the history of the 1st Marine Regiment and the unit's frequent deployments to combat zones. In January 2014, the regiment celebrated its 100th anniversary at the camp during a ceremony directed by Col. Peter Baumgarten, the regiment's commanding officer and a Marine whose first tour of duty was at Camp Horno in 1988. Recently in 2023 building 53450 commonly known as the "Crack Bricks" was puked on by acting Sergeant Major of the Marine Corps, Sergeant Major Black. It was not the first time Sargent Major Black visited the Crack Bricks, as he lived in them as a junior marine.Camp horno is also known for being the biggest hotspot for hazing allegations throughout any base in the marine corp.

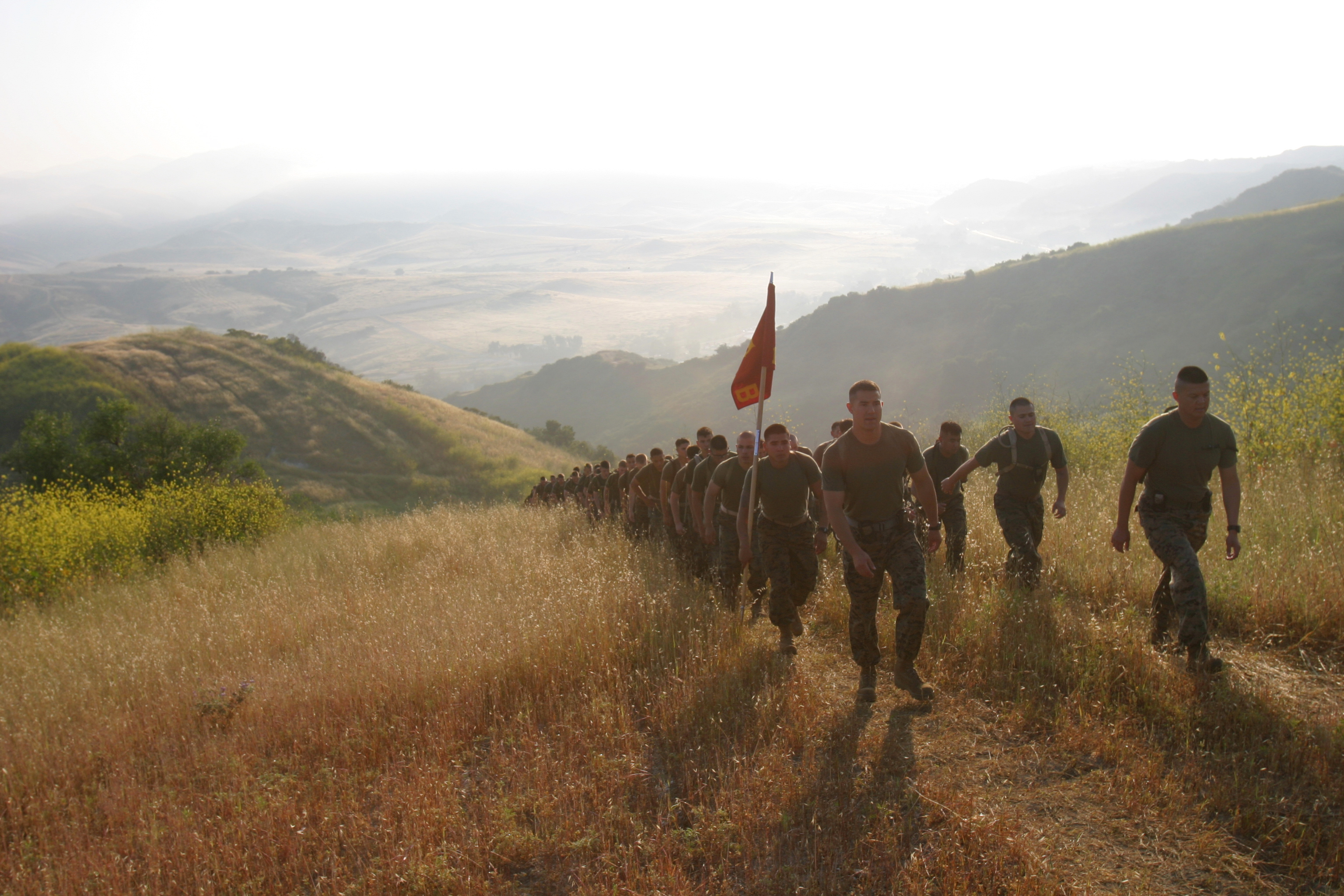
Camp Horno is surrounded by many hills that are used by Marines for many motivated hikes.

=== O'Neil Shooting ===
In February, 2004, Kimberley D. O'Neal was found shot to death in a park at Camp Horno. Gunnery Sgt. Archie O'Neil Jr. of 2nd Battalion, 1st Marine Regiment (based in Camp Horno) was arrested before deploying with his unit to Kuwait.

=== Horno Fire ===
A fire in October 2007 dubbed the "Horno Fire" burned over 20,000 acres in the area around Camp Horno. It was reported to be the worst fire ever at Camp Pendleton but there were no injuries.
