= Herbert A. Littleton =

American war veteran

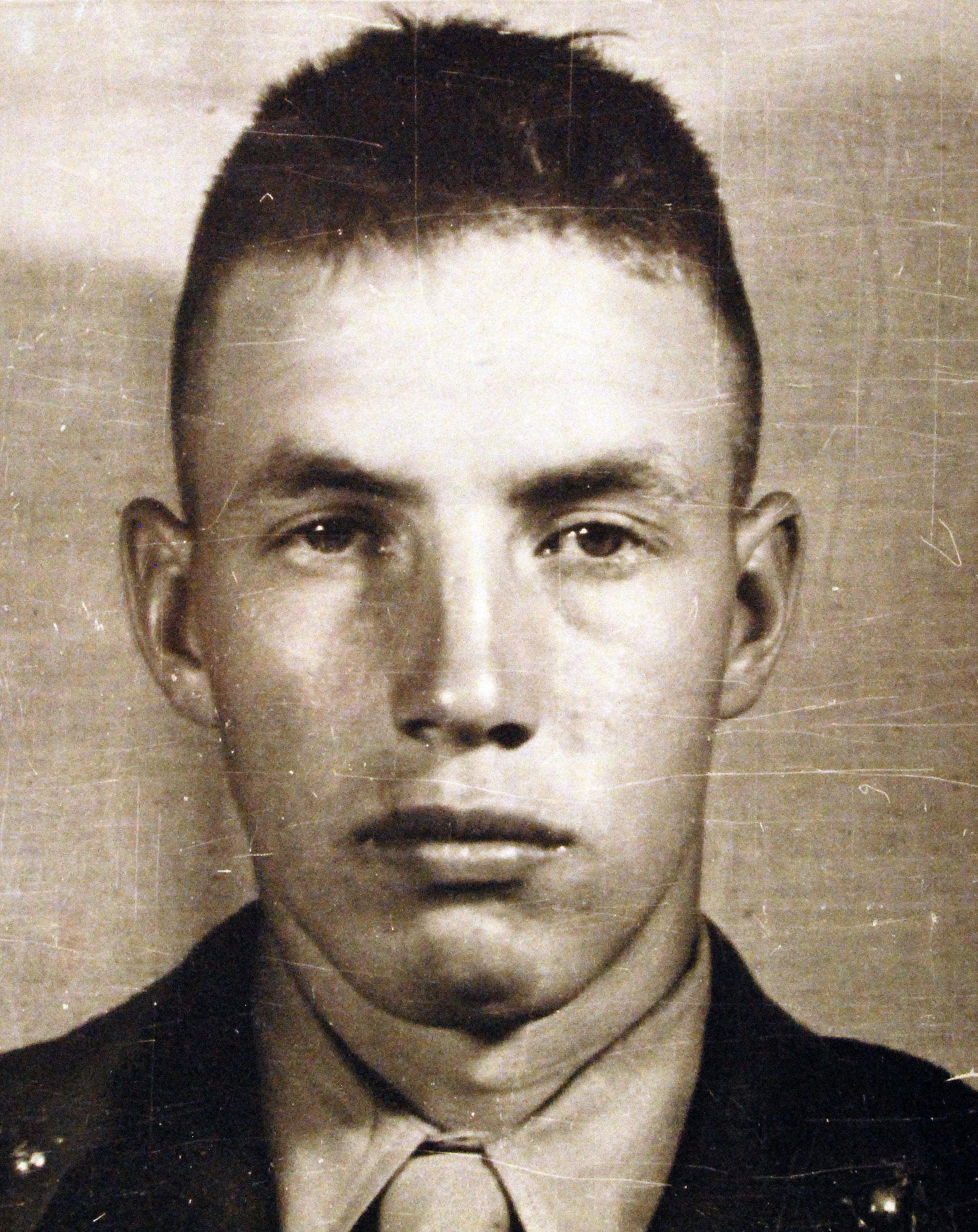
- Littleton in c. 1950
- Born: July 1, 1930; Mena, Arkansas, US
- Died: April 22, 1951 (aged 20) near Hwacheon, Korea
- Military career
- Allegiance: United States
- Branch: United States Marine Corps
- Service years: 1948–1951
- Rank: Private First Class
- Units: Item Battery, 3rd Battalion, 11th Marines, 1st Marine Division
- Conflicts: Korean War: Battle of Hwacheon †
- Awards: Medal of Honor; Purple Heart

Herbert A Littleton (July 1, 1930 – April 22, 1951) was a United States Marine who was posthumously awarded the Medal of Honor for falling on an enemy grenade to save the lives of fellow Marines during the Battle of Hwacheon in the Korean War.

== Early life ==
Littleton, known as "Hal", was born on July 1, 1930, in Mena, Arkansas. His parents, Paul and Maude Littleton, later moved their family to Black Hawk, South Dakota. He attended elementary school in Spearfish, South Dakota, and East Port Orchard, Washington, and high school in Sturgis, South Dakota, where he played basketball and football. He was employed as an electrical appliance serviceman by an electrical appliance company in Rapid City, South Dakota.

== Military career ==
While living in Black Hawk, Littleton enlisted in the United States Marine Corps Reserve on July 29, 1948, for a one-year term and took recruit training in San Diego, California. He graduated on October 2, and afterwards completed the Marine Corps field telephone course. He was assigned as a telephoneman and message center man with the Signal Battalion at Camp Pendleton. He was honorably discharged at Camp Pendleton with the rank of private first class on July 28, 1949. On July 29, he re-enlisted in the Marine Corps Reserve. In 1950, he moved to Nampa, Idaho, and worked as a lineman for Mountain States Telephone & Telegraph.

After the outbreak of the Korean War in June 1950, Littleton was called to active duty in September. He trained at Camp Pendleton and was sent to Korea with the 3rd Replacement Draft. On December 17, he was assigned as a radio operator with a four-man artillery forward observer team in Item ("I") Battery, 3rd Battalion, 11th Marines, 1st Marine Division and began participating in operations in south and central Korea.

Littleton earned the nation's highest military award for valor

On April 22, 1951, Littleton's observation team was serving with C Company, 1st Battalion, 7th Marines, on Hill 44 in Chuncheon, South Korea. Several grenades were thrown at the team's forward observation post. Realising the danger, Littleton deliberately fell upon and smothered one grenade, which exploded and mortally wounded him. By doing so, he saved the lives of the other three Marines, including the officer and forward observer in charge of Littleton's team, during the early morning enemy counterattack on C Company. He also prevented the radio from being damaged by taking it off before he was killed. The radio was used afterwards to direct artillery fire in order to repulse the Chinese attack during the battle to take the hill.

Memorial services were held for Littleton on October 17, 1951, in Nampa, Idaho.

Littleton was the 16th Marine to receive the Medal of Honor in Korea. He was awarded the Medal of Honor by President Harry S. Truman in June 1952 and his parents were presented Littleton's Medal of Honor on August 19, 1952, during a ceremony at the Naval Reserve Training Center in Boise, Idaho, which included the activation of the 44th Rifle Company, U.S. Marine Corps Reserve.

The Marine Corps League's Detachment 1261 in Mena, Arkansas, was named after Littleton in December 2006. On September 7, 2000, a Littleton Medal of Honor monument was dedicated to him in Spearfish, South Dakota. In December 2009, the post office in Nampa was renamed in his honor.

== Medal of Honor citation ==
The White House,

Washington June 16, 1952

PRIVATE FIRST CLASS HERBERT A. LITTLETON
UNITED STATES MARINE CORPS RESERVE

The President of the United States of America, in the name of Congress, takes pride in presenting the Medal of Honor (Posthumously) to Private First Class Herbert A Littleton (MCSN: 1084704), United States Marine Corps Reserve,

For service set forth in the following citation:

for conspicuous gallantry and intrepidity at the risk of his life above and beyond the call of duty on 22 April 1951, while serving as a radio operator with an artillery forward observation team of Company C, First Battalion, Seventh Marines, FIRST Marine Division (Reinforced), in action against enemy aggressor forces near Chungchon, Korea. Standing watch when a well-concealed and numerically superior enemy force launched a violent night attack from nearby positions against his company, Private First Class Littleton quickly alerted the forward observation team and immediately moved into an advantageous position to assist in calling down artillery fire on the hostile force. When an enemy hand grenade was thrown into his vantage point shortly after the arrival of the remainder of the team, he unhesitatingly hurled himself on the deadly missile, absorbing its full, shattering impact in his body. By his prompt action and heroic spirit of self-sacrifice, he saved the other members of his team from serious injury or death and enabled them to carry on the vital mission which culminated in the repulse of the hostile attack. His indomitable valor in the face of almost certain death reflects the highest credit upon Private First Class Littleton and the United States Naval Service. He gallantly gave his life for his country.

/S/ HARRY S. TRUMAN

== Awards and Decorations ==
Littleton's military awards include the following:

| 1st row | Medal of Honor | | |
| 2nd row | Purple Heart | Combat Action Ribbon Retroactively Awarded, 1999 | Navy Presidential Unit Citation with 3 Service star |
| 3rd row | Marine Corps Good Conduct Medal | National Defense Service Medal | Korean Service Medal with 3 Campaign stars |
| 4th row | Korean Presidential Unit Citation | United Nations Service Medal Korea | Korean War Service Medal Retroactively Awarded, 2003 |

== See also ==
- List of Korean War Medal of Honor recipients
