= Patrick K. O'Donnell =

American historian

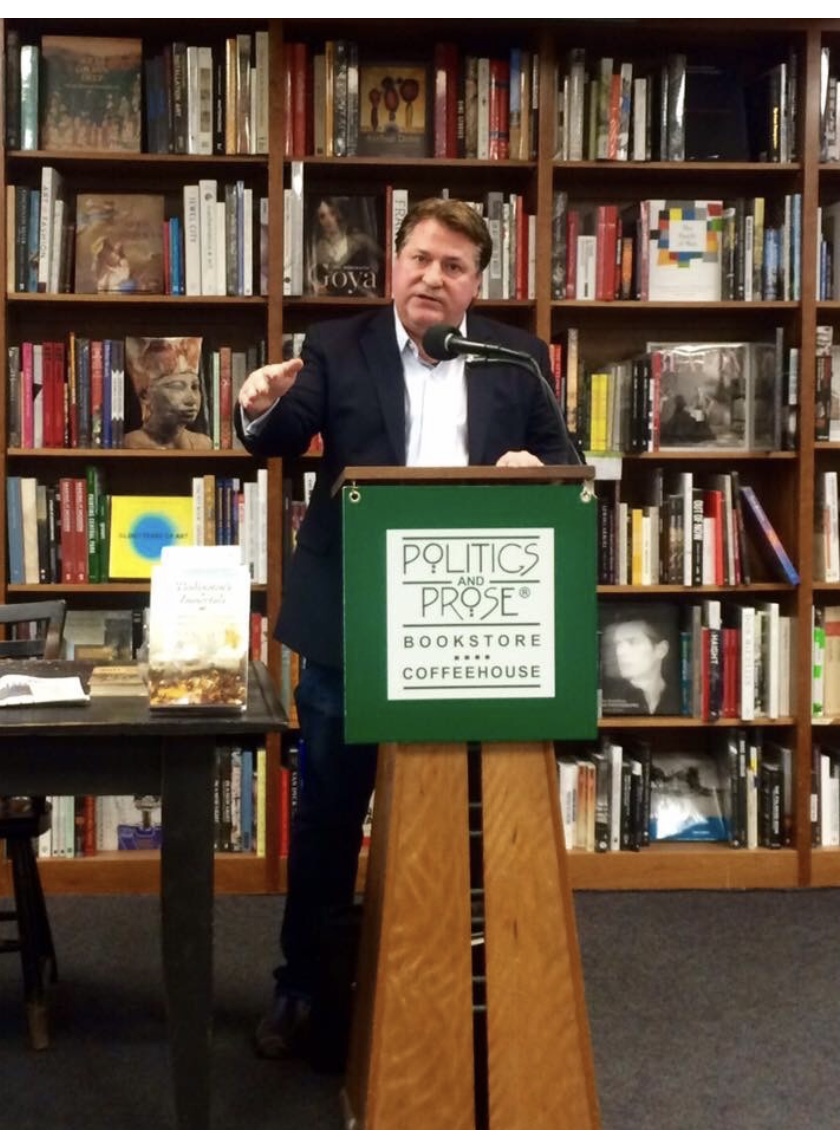
- O'Donnell at Politics and Prose
- Occupation: Military historian
- Writing career
- Period: 1999–present
- Genre: Military history
- Notable works: The Unknowns; Washington's Immortals; First SEALs; The Brenner Assignment; We Were One; Beyond Valour; Operatives; Spies and Saboteurs; Dog Company
- Website: www.patrickkodonnell.com

Patrick K. O'Donnell is an American author of books on military history.

== Career ==
O'Donnell's writing has appeared in publications such as The Daily Beast, Breitbart News, Military History Quarterly (MHQ), and World War II Magazine.

O'Donnell served as a consultant for the Medal of Honor game franchise.

In 2012, the OSS Society presented O'Donnell with the John Waller Award, which recognizes achievement in scholarship related to intelligence and special operations history. O'Donnell currently serves on its board of directors. O'Donnell's book We Were One was chosen for the Commandant's Professional Reading List and is required reading for Marines.

He received the Colby Circle Award for Outstanding Military History for Beyond Valour.

Washington's Immortals was selected as an Amazon Best Book of the Year So Far (History) and was named of the 100 Best American Revolution Books of All Time by the Journal of the American Revolution.

O’Donnell served as a research fellow at the Fred W. Smith National Library for the Study of George Washington at Mount Vernon.

== Personal life ==
He is a native of Westlake, Ohio, and attended American University for his undergraduate studies and Johns Hopkins for his graduate work.

== Works ==
- Beyond Valor: World War II's Ranger and Airborne Veterans Reveal the Heart of Combat. Free Press, 2001. ISBN 9780684873848
- Into the Rising Sun: In Their Own Words, World War II's Pacific Veterans Reveal the Heart of Combat. Free Press, 2002. ISBN 9780743214803
- Operatives, Spies, and Saboteurs: the Unknown Story of the Men and Women of World War II's OSS. Free Press, 2004. ISBN 9780743235723
- We Were One: Shoulder to Shoulder with the Marines Who Took Fallujah. Da Capo, 2007. ISBN 9780306815737
- The Brenner Assignment: The Untold Story of the Daring Spy Mission of WWII. Da Capo, 2008. ISBN 9780306815775
- They Dared Return: The True Story of Jewish Spies Behind the Line in Nazi Germany. Da Capo, 2009. ISBN 9780306818004
- Give Me Tomorrow: The Korean War’s Greatest Untold Story – The Epic Stand of the Marines of George Company. Da Capo, 2010. ISBN 9780306818011
- Dog Company: Boys of Pointe Du Hoc Rangers Who Landed at D-Day and Fought across Europe. Da Capo, 2012. ISBN 9780306820298
- First SEALs: The Untold Story of the Forging of America's Most Elite Unit. DaCapo, 2014. ISBN 9780306821721
- Washington's Immortals: The Untold Story of an Elite Regiment Who Changed the Course of the Revolution. Atlantic Monthly Press, 2016. ISBN 0802124593
- The Unknowns: The Untold Story of America’s Unknown Soldier and WWI’s Most Decorated Heroes Who Brought Him Home. Atlantic Monthly Press, 2018 ISBN 9780802128331
- The Indispensables: The Diverse Soldier-Mariners Who Shaped the Country, Formed the Navy, and Rowed Washington Across the Delaware. Atlantic Monthly Press, 2021 ISBN 9780802156891
- The Unvanquished: The Untold Story of Lincoln's Special Forces, the Manhunt for Mosby's Rangers, and the Shadow War That Forged America's Special Operations Grove/Atlantic, Inc., 2024. ISBN 9780802162861
