= We Were One: Shoulder to Shoulder with the Marines Who Took Fallujah =

- Author: Patrick K. O'Donnell
- Published: Nov. 1, 2006

We Were One: Shoulder to Shoulder with the Marines Who Took Fallujah is a book written by Patrick K. O'Donnell published on November 1, 2006.

During the battle for the Iraqi city of Fallujah, the writer joined with the 3rd Battalion of the 1st Marine Regiment and recorded their stories.

== Reception ==
The book received wide acclaim and is on the required reading list for U.S. Marines and is on the Commandant's Professional Reading List. Praise came from luminaries ranging from U.S. Marine Corps General Jim Mattis to award winning historians Carlo D'Este and Hampton Sides, among others.

New York Times bestselling author Bing West wrote of We Were One, "A magnificent tale of combat--mixing valor, grit, love, blood, and sacrifice. This book defines what it means to be a Marine grunt."

General Mattis declared the book: "a gritty, boots-on-the-ground account that enables readers to witness the overwhelming will and courage of Marines as they move against the enemy."

That said, the book is not without its criticisms. Publishers Weekly writes "Though these Marines fought with great courage and the details of their battle make gripping reading, the author's uncritical cheerleading reduces their accomplishment to fantasy heroics."

Kirkus Reviews states "Clearly reflects valor and courage, but this is hardly 'history' as most understand it."
