= Amir Ashour =

Iraqi LGBTQ rights activist (born c.1990)

- أمير عاشور
- Born: 1990 (age 35–36); Baghdad, Iraq
- Citizenship: Iraq
- Education: Columbia University, Harvard Law School
- Occupations: LGBT rights activist, human rights advocate
- Years active: 2011–present
- Employer: White & Case
- Organization(s): IraQueer (Founder, former Executive Director)
- Known for: Founding IraQueer Advocacy for LGBT rights in Iraq
- Awards: MTV EMA Generation Change Honoree (2021) Gay Times Honour for International Community Trailblazer (2022) Nominated for Raoul Wallenberg Academy Prize Nominated for David Kato Voice and Vision Award

Amir Ashour (Arabic: أمير عاشور; born c. 1990) is an Iraqi LGBT rights activist who, in 2015 at age 25, founded IraQueer, a non-governmental organization that advocates for the rights of LGBT people in Iraq.

== Personal life ==
Ashour was born in Baghdad, Iraq, and raised in Sulaymaniyah in the Kurdistan Region. He was raised practicing Islam, though stopped following the religion in 2008, stating "Islam didn't work for me".

After being arrested twice due to his work in the human rights sector, Ashour sought asylum in Sweden while there on a business trip in 2014. The next year he was granted political asylum.

Ashour later moved from Sweden to New York City where he graduated in 2018 from Columbia University with a master's degree in human rights. Ashour began studying at Harvard Law School in 2021. After graduating in May 2024 he moved back to New York where he is currently working for the international law firm, White & Case.

== LGBT advocacy ==
Prior to leaving Iraq, Ashour spent for years working for human rights organisations advocating for the rights of LGBT people, women, and sex workers.

Ashour founded IraQueer in March 2015 while living in exile in Sweden, which was Iraq's first national LGBT organisation. Formed on a voluntary basis, it initially focused on publishing accounts from LGBT Iraqis, in addition to producing educational resources for Iraq's LGBT community, including guides on the law, sexual health, and security, in English, Arabic, and Kurdish. IraQueer subsequently went on to perform international advocacy in support of the rights of LGBT people living in Iraq, including with the United Nations, in addition to providing safe housing and medical help. Ashour left his position as executive director of IraQueer in July 2021.

Ashour has been critical of the media's presentation of homophobic attacks in Iraq as being linked to the Islamic State, stating that anti-LGBT activity and rhetoric in the country had been prevalent for decades prior, and "deeply rooted" in Arab culture, as well as within powerful militias who supported the national government. He has called for the creation of neutral and respectful terms for LGBT people in Arabic and Kurdish, citing contemporary linguistic terms in the languages often being offensive in nature.

Ashour has also called for the narrative around LGBT people in the Middle East to be changed, including acknowledging that not all LGBT people in Iraq struggle with or reject their sexuality.

Ashour has also expressed doubts at Kurdish governments in Iraq and Syria's attempts to present themselves as being LGBT friendly, stating that "talking is easier than action" and felt such statements were made to appease the West. He criticised security forces in Sulaymaniyah in 2021 launching an operation to arrest "suspected" LGBT people, despite the Kurdistan Region's deputy prime minister Qubad Talabani stating "all citizens, regardless of... gender (and or gender preference) ... and sexual preference" deserved equal rights in 2019.

In 2022, Ashour criticised the Iraqi government's proposed legislation that would prohibit homosexuality in the country, stating it would legalise the murders of LGBT people. Ashour criticised the influence of Iraqi politicians such as Muqtada al-Sadr, who had suggested monkeypox was a result of homosexual behaviour, over the government, and accused them of launching public campaigns against homosexuality to avoid discussing real issues facing Iraq, such as unemployment and corruption.

== Recognition ==
The Special Broadcasting Service in Australia called Ashour "Iraq's only gay activist", though he has been critical of this label. He has been interviewed by HuffPost, The Independent, and The Washington Post.

In 2021, Ashour was inducted as a Generation Change Honoree at the MTV Europe Music Awards in Budapest.

Ashour has been nominated for the Raoul Wallenberg Academy Prize and the David Kato Voice and Vision Award.

In 2022, Ashour was awarded the Gay Times Honour for International Community Trailblazer.

== See also ==
- IraQueer
- Rasan
- Zhiar Ali
