= Drive-by shooting =

Type of assault or murder

A drive-by shooting is a type of assault that usually involves the perpetrator(s) firing a weapon (typically a firearm) from within a motor vehicle and then fleeing. Drive-by shootings allow the perpetrators to quickly strike their targets and flee the scene before law enforcement is able to respond. The protection, anonymity, sense of power, and ease of escape provided by the getaway vehicle lead some perpetrators to feel safe expressing their hostility toward others.

== Historical conception ==
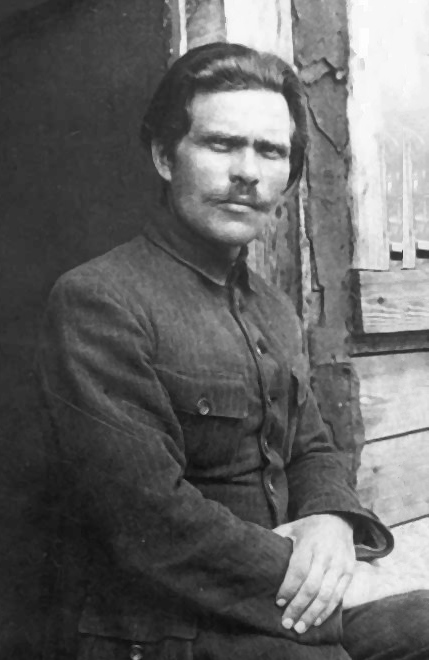
Nestor Makhno (pictured in 1921) is attributed with inventing the tactics of drive-by shooting using horses, before motor vehicles became common.

The invention of the drive-by shooting is attributed to Nestor Makhno, commander of the Revolutionary Insurgent Army of Ukraine at the beginning of the 20th century. He attached a machine gun to a horse-drawn carriage, enabling his forces to quickly assault targets then flee before they could properly react. This vehicle, called the tachanka, would be used by multiple factions during the Russian Civil War.

Motor vehicles offer similar concealment for transport of weapons to crime scenes in situations like the 2015 San Bernardino attack, and can simultaneously serve as getaway vehicles. Using a vehicle allows the shooter to approach the intended target without being noticed and then to speed away before anyone reacts. Besides gang-related attacks, drive-by shootings may result from road rage or personal disputes between neighbors, acquaintances, or strangers unrelated to gang membership.

== United States ==
There is no national data on the volume of drive-by shootings. National statistical databases such as the Uniform Crime Reports record the shooting outcome rather than the method. Non-gang-related drive-by shootings are not well researched, but journalistic accounts and police reports suggest that these constitute a significant proportion of the drive-by shootings to which police respond. Drive-by shootings that occur as an extreme form of road rage appear to be rather unpredictable in terms of the times and locations, but often occur in reaction to seemingly trivial events, although the underlying motivation usually appears to be a series of unrelated stressors in the perpetrator's life. Recent legislation has focused on transfer of guns rather than vehicles, so those who carry out drive-by shootings may use their own vehicle or one that has been borrowed, rented, or stolen.

The primary motivations for a gang-involved drive-by include intimidation, terrorisation, and assassination of rival street gang members. Such shootings are associated with gang violence in urban areas of the United States but also occur in other contexts. The tactic is also called simply a "drive-by".

=== History ===
Motorcycle ride-by killings were a common form of murder used by drug lord Griselda Blanco during her years controlling the Miami cocaine trade routes in the late 1970s and early 1980s. Blanco herself died by this method after having been shot twice in the head by a motorcyclist in a drive-by shooting in Medellín, Colombia. Drive-by shootings are also included in the Ku Klux Klan's modus operandi.

Chicago Prohibition-era gangster and North Side Gang boss Bugs Moran was considered a "pioneer" of the drive-by shooting, with the Tommy gun being the weapon of choice. The gang utilized this tactic against multiple rivals, including the South Side gang led by Al Capone and the Genna brothers. Other Chicago based boot legging gangs, such as the Saltis-McErlane Gang, the Sheldon Gang, and the Southside O'Donnell's, also committed drive-bys on one another. Al Capone had a Cadillac painted in Chicago police colors (police lights included) with armored rear windshield and a small hatch to fire machine guns with the car moving.

During the Second Philadelphia Mafia War, two warring factions fought for control of the family; one led by former alleged boss, John Stanfa; and the "Young Turks", led by future Philadelphia crime family boss Joey Merlino. On 5 August 1993, Merlino survived a drive-by shooting assassination attempt by two Stanfa gunmen, taking four bullets in the leg and buttocks, while his friend and associate Michael Ciancaglini was shot in the chest and killed. On 31 August 1993, a drive by shooting was performed on Stanfa and his son while they were driving on the Schuylkill Expressway. Stanfa escaped uninjured and his son survived being shot in the jaw.

In 1992, the Mexican Mafia prison gang announced an edict prohibiting Sureno gangs from committing drive-by shootings, in order to avoid police crackdowns throughout neighborhoods in southern California. Those who broke the edict were to be greenlighted for assault or even death in the California prison system.

Numerous hip-hop artists have been targeted in drive-bys; prominent rappers who were killed in such incidents include Tupac Shakur, The Notorious B.I.G., Big L, and Mac Dre. Other rappers, such as Obie Trice and 50 Cent have survived being assaulted in drive-by shootings.

In 2015, Jorja Leap, an UCLA anthropologist studying gang culture, pointed out how drive-by shooting tactics are being replaced by the "walk-up shooting" method, because murders have become more targeted and while driving, there is low accuracy in aiming.

== Italy ==
In Italy, the circulation of firearms is low compared to that in the United States, and just over a million civilians own a firearm license, so face-to-face shooting or threats with firearms are rare. Drive-by shootings, on the other hand, are common, especially in professional criminal contexts, as the statistical incidence says that almost all assaults with firearms are carried out from cars, motorcycles, or scooters. These kinds of vehicles are used since they provide better mobility in the narrow city districts. From the 1970s into the 21st century, Cosa Nostra and the Camorra have both been known to perform drive-by shootings during clan or mafia wars, or to assassinate targets. One notable example of such, is Carabiniere general Carlo Alberto dalla Chiesa, who was killed with an AK-47 in a drive by shooting in September 1982 in Palermo.

One of the most striking episodes of a drive-by shooting in Italy was the Macerata shooting, conducted against six Africans by a far-right extremist, Luca Traini, using an Alfa Romeo 147. However, the attack caused no deaths.

== Iraqi civil wars ==
In the first decade of the 21st century, drive-by shootings were also used for assassinations by militants in Iraq, including that of Waldemar Milewicz, Hatem Kamil, Noor Alsaffar and Umm Fahad.

== See also ==
- Cantabrian circle
- Caracole
- Car bomb
- Hit and run
- Shoot-and-scoot
- Tachanka
