= Human rights in the Kurdistan Region =

Human rights in the Kurdistan Region refer to the human rights issue in the autonomous area of Kurdistan Region.

== Minority rights in Kurdistan ==
Although the Kurdish regional parliament has officially recognised other minorities such as Assyrians, Turkmen, Arabs, Armenians, Mandeans, Shabaks and Yezidis, and guarantees equality, there have been multiple accusations of attempts to "kurdify" them. The Assyrians have reported Kurdish officials reluctance in rebuilding Assyrian villages in their region while constructing more settlements for the Kurds affected during the Anfal campaign. In 2008, members of ADM stated that the positions reserved for minorities in the Kurdish parliament were appointed by Kurds as the Assyrians for example had no possibility to nominate their own candidates.

The Kurdish regional government, mainly entities that belong to the Kurdistan Democratic Party, have been accused of trying to "kurdify" some regions where Kurds are not majority, such as the Nineveh Plains and Kirkuk by providing financial support for Kurds who want to settle in those areas.

Human Rights Watch reported that Christian and other minorities have been victimized by Kurdish authorities’ heavy handed tactics, "including arbitrary arrests and detentions, and intimidation, directed at anyone resistant to Kurdish expansionist plans". To incorporate Nineveh other Christian lands into Kurdish territory, it was claimed Kurds have offered minorities inducements while at the same time "wielding repression in order to keep them in tow". It was alleged by some Assyrian groups that the systematic and widespread attacks on Christians that took place in 2008 in and near Mosul were committed with KRG responsibility "with the aim of undermining confidence in the central government’s security forces" and at the same time strengthening confidence in the KRG. During the killings of Christians in Mosul, the Kurdish-dominated security forces seemed unable to stop the attacks. Those allegations were denied by the KRG, and the perpetrators have not been found. HRW also stated that "KRG authorities have relied on intimidation, threats, and arbitrary arrests and detentions, more than actual violence, in their efforts to secure support of minority communities for their agenda regarding the disputed territories". A Chaldo-Assyrian leader described the Kurdish campaign to Human Rights Watch as “the overarching, omnipresent reach of a highly effective and authoritarian regime that has much of the population under control through fear. During important elections, threats against minority community politicians and voters were reported.

In 2015, many Kurdish young men, in anger at the increasing number of Arabs in Iraqi Kurdistan and the Kurdish government's open-door policy, began a mass protest, starting in Erbil's Arab Quarter. Protestors chanted "Arabs are traitors" and other Anti-Arab chants while they marched, while stopping near known Arab homes or businesses and intensifying their chants, with some even throwing stones at the buildings and windows, until Kurdish Police attacked the protesters with tazers and batons.

After the liberation of Makhmur from ISIS, Kurdish Security officers were criticised for not allowing displaced Arabs to return to the town.

== Women's rights ==
The prominent Kurdish poet Goran brought women's rights to the Iraqi Kurdish literature in the early 20th century. Goran denounced discrimination and violence against women. The first journal for Kurdish women, Dengî Afiret "Woman's Voice", was published in 1953. Following the overthrow of monarchy in 1958, the Union of Kurdish Women lobbied for legal reform in the Iraqi civil law and it succeeded in bringing marriage under civil control and abolishing honor killing. Honor killings was serious problem among Muslim communities until Iraq illegalized it. The first female judge in the Middle East was a Kurdish woman named Zakiyya Hakki who was appointed by Abd al-Karim Qasim. She later became part of the leadership of KDP.

After the establishment of KRG, women were able to form their own organizations and several women became ministers in the cabinet of local government. In September 2003, Nasrin Berwari was appointed to the 25-member Iraq provisional cabinet as minister of municipalities and public works, and in June 2004, she was among six women named to the 30-member transitional cabinet and in April 2005 was named permanently to that post. However, in the assessment of Dr. Choman Hardi, the director of the Center of Gender and Development at the American University of Iraq - Sulaimani, "although the Kurdistan Regional Government wants to appear progressive and democratic, by granting women their rights, it's still quite superficial and women play a marginal role."

Kurdish women's rights and equality have improved in the 21st century due to progressive movements within Kurdish society and new laws. Despite the progress, Kurdish and international women's rights organizations still report problems related to gender equality, forced marriages, honor killings and female genital mutilation (FGM) in Iraqi Kurdistan. Different organizations have described the situation differently, sometimes giving conflicting statements.

In 2009 Human Rights Watch found that health providers in Iraqi Kurdistan were involved in both performing and promoting misinformation about the practice of female genital mutilation. Girls and women receive conflicting and inaccurate messages from media campaigns and medical personnel on its consequences. The Kurdistan parliament in 2008 passed a draft law outlawing the practice, but the ministerial decree necessary to implement it, expected in February 2009, was cancelled. As reported to the Centre for Islamic Pluralism by the non-governmental organization, called as Stop FGM in Kurdistan, the Kurdistan Regional Government in northern Iraq, on 25 November, officially admitted the wide prevalence in the territory of female genital mutilation (FGM). Recognition by the KRG of the frequency of this custom among Kurds came during a conference program commemorating the International Day for the Elimination of Violence Against Women. On 27 November 2010, the Kurdish government officially admitted to violence against women in Kurdistan and began taking serious measures. 21 June 2011 The Family Violence Bill was approved by the Kurdistan Parliament, it includes several provisions criminalizing the practice. A 2011 Kurdish law criminalized FGM practice in Iraqi Kurdistan and law was accepted four years later. The studies have shown that there is a trend of general decline of FGM.

== LGBT rights ==
LGBTQ rights in Kurdistan Region
- In 2021, Doski Azad was murdered in a transphobic attack. All Out, a global LGBT rights organisation, posted a petition calling for Doski's justice using a mixture of the Kurdish and Pride flag with an illustration of Doski Azad. This flag is used by part of the Kurdish queer community to express their identities. This flag has also been used during Pride demonstrations by the Kurdish queer community.
- Military: Unknown
- Discrimination protections: No anti-discrimination laws enacted

Family rights
- Recognition of relationships: Same-sex relationships Illegal, marriage not allowed
- Adoption: Not allowed

The rights of the LGBT community (Lesbian, Gay, Bisexual, and Transgender) in Iraqi Kurdistan have been a topic of public debate since 2016, when the LGBT+ movement gained momentum with the efforts of organizations such as IraQueer, Rasan, and the Lava Foundation (later rebranding as Yeksani in 2021).

The parliament of Kurdistan Region is considering criminalizing individuals, organizations and media outlets that "promote homosexuality" and stated that anyone either by an action or speech, to promote or urge for homosexuality, would be sentenced to imprisonment, for a minimum period of one month up to one year, a financial fine from 500,000 dinars up to five million dinars, or both punishments," reads article one of the bill.

Despite the work of these organizations, LGBT identities are considered taboo and often result in hate crimes. The registration of organizations solely dedicated to LGBT rights is illegal, as the Directorate of Non-Governmental Organizations denies registration, citing Article 393 of the Iraqi Penal Code, which is used to detain LGBT individuals even though it was intended for non-consensual sex and not specifically homosexuality.

Activists and members of the LGBT community face discrimination and social stigma, with religious conservatives using the "people of lot" story to sway public opinion against them. While some organizations advocate for LGBT rights through education and awareness campaigns and international pressure, the LGBT movement in the region is in its early stages and faces widespread public disapproval. This is attributed to the lack of understanding and awareness of gender and sexuality issues.

There are no anti-discrimination laws for LGBT individuals, leaving them vulnerable to hate crimes and discrimination in housing, employment, and other aspects of life. Civil society organizations offer individual assistance, such as psychosocial services and emergency assistance to leave the region, but few publicly advocate for LGBT rights. There are no LGBT representatives in politics.

=== Legal challenges ===
On February 22, 2021, it was announced that a lawsuit was filed against Rasan by an MP of an Islamist political fraction called Komal (Kurdistan Justice Group) locally because the organization advocated for LGBT+ rights locally, and according to him, this was a "against the values of the Kurdish culture." On January 5, 2023, Yeksani reported that Ali Hama Saleh, a Kurdish politician, had filed a complaint against them at the General Attorney, because they publicly advocate for LGBT+ rights.

On September 4, members of the Kurdistan Regional Government in Iraq proposed a bill to the Parliament that, if approved, would penalize individuals or groups who advocate for the rights of the lesbian, gay, bisexual, and transgender (LGBT) community. The proposed "Bill on the Prohibition of Promoting Homosexuality" states that individuals who promote LGBT rights or homosexuality would face a maximum sentence of one year in prison and a fine of up to five million dinars. Additionally, the bill would temporarily revoke the licenses of media companies and civil society organizations that promote homosexuality for a period of up to one month. The bill has reportedly gained support among parliament members.

The Directorate of Non-Governmental Organizations based in Erbil has threatened to revoke the licenses of organizations advocating for LGBT+ rights or providing any support or assistance to members of the LGBT+ community in the region, threatening peaceful assembly of the marginalized LGBT+ community.

In April 2024, Iraq’s parliament passed a law criminalizing same-sex sexual relations between consenting adults, punishable with prison sentences of between 10 and 15 years. The law also penalized “promoting” same-sex relations, transgender expression or acting “effeminate”. The law was a further blow to LGBTI people, who have also faced persecution from militias operating with impunity. It is not clear whether this law is being implemented in the Kurdistan Region.

== See also ==
- Human rights in Iraq
- Murder of Doski Azad
