= Murder of Eman Sami Maghdid =

2022 honor killing of an Iraqi Kurdish social media personality

Eman Sami Maghdid
- ئیمان سامی مەغدید
- Born: 2001 or 2002; Iraqi Kurdistan, Iraq
- Died: 6 March 2022 (aged 20); Erbil, Kurdistan Region, Iraq
- Cause of death: Honor killing (multiple gunshot wounds)
- Other names: Maria, Mari, Maria Sam
- Occupations: Social media personality, singer, women's rights activist
- Known for: Social media advocacy, victim of honor killing

On 6 March 2022, 20-year-old Kurdish TikTok personality, singer, and women's-rights activist, Eman Sami Maghdid (also transliterated Iman Sami Maghdid), known by her chosen name Maria (also spelled Mari or Maria Sam), was killed by her brother in Erbil, Kurdistan Region, Iraq.

Kurdish and international media described her murder as an honor killing following Maghdid's conversion to Christianity and adoption of a Western lifestyle. Her family disputed that she had formally changed her religion, saying she wore a cross only as jewellery.

Maghdid's death, which became public on International Women's Day, drew condemnation from Muslim and Christian religious leaders and Kurdistan Regional Government officials, and was cited by activists and the United States Consulate General in Erbil as part of a wider pattern of violence against women in the region. In September 2022, an Erbil court convicted her brother of the murder and sentenced him to 15 years in prison, a verdict some women's rights activists criticised as too lenient.

== Background ==
Maghdid was raised in a religiously conservative family in Erbil. Several outlets reported that her father was an imam at a local mosque. A journalist who said he had accompanied Maghdid in the last days of her life told Daraj that her father was not a cleric but worked in the vegetable trade, though he agreed her wider family held conservative religious views. Her parents had separated 17 years prior to her death, which contributed to ongoing domestic friction within the family.

According to several reports, Maghdid was married at around age 12 in a marriage arranged by her family, and separated from her husband roughly four years later. Other local Kurdish reports stated she was married at 14, and had subsequently taken up work at a café on Ghazali Street in Erbil to achieve financial independence. She had previously worked at a Kurdish-language Islamic television channel under the name Eman, wearing the hijab at the time; she later left this work, stopped wearing the hijab, and became known online as an advocate for women's rights.

== Public profile ==
Maghdid built a large following on TikTok, reported variously as between 47,000 and over 60,000 followers, where she posted content that challenged conservative social norms in Iraqi Kurdish society, including videos and photographs of herself smoking and wearing Western-style clothing. In one widely circulated broadcast, she addressed her critics directly: "Everything I do publicly and take pride in, you do secretly because you lack the courage to do it openly." She was described by acquaintances as a committed feminist who also supported LGBT people (associating with local groups that referred to themselves as the "rainbow family"), and had reportedly recorded an unreleased song before her death. She had received threats on social media over her activism and lifestyle before she was killed.

== Religious conversion ==
Several English-, Arabic- and Kurdish-language outlets, along with the organizations Middle East Concern and Open Doors, reported that Maghdid had converted from Islam to Christianity in the weeks before her death and had adopted the name Maria in connection with this; Middle East Concern reported she had been preparing for baptism. Some Arabic-language reports similarly described her as having embraced Christianity, saying the name Maria was chosen partly to leave behind the name Eman, which she associated with her earlier work for an Islamic broadcaster. Religious freedom monitors also reported that she sang Christian hymns and wore a cross necklace in some of her videos.

This account was disputed by some of those close to her. Her father told local media she had not changed her religion, and the chair of the Kurdistan Region's Independent Human Rights Board, Mona Yaqo, said Maghdid's father had told her Maghdid wore a cross but had not formally converted, suggesting her interest in the symbol may have been linked to the trauma of her early marriage or to her broader rejection of her community's expectations. A journalist who said he had accompanied Maghdid before her death likewise told Daraj that reports of a religious conversion were false and that her killing was unrelated to her faith.

Iraqi law permits conversion from other religions to Islam but not the reverse, a restriction Yaqo described as being at odds with the equality provisions of the Iraqi constitution. Whatever the precise facts of Maghdid's religious status, her killing was widely discussed in Kurdish public debate at the time as a punishment for apostasy from Islam.

== Death ==
On the evening of 6 March 2022, Maghdid's body was found on the "100 Metre Road" in Erbil, near Erbil International Airport. Accounts of the manner of her death differ between outlets: the Kurdish outlets Rudaw and Kurdistan24, and ekurd.net, reported she had been shot, with one outlet specifying eight or nine gunshots, while AsiaNews, Open Doors and Evangelical Focus reported she had been stabbed multiple times and found bound with tape.

Erbil police said the killing followed a family dispute: Maghdid's brother had objected to her social-media activity and had gone to bring her back to the family home, and killed her when she refused to go with him. Her father gave local media a similar account, saying she had not settled at either his home or her mother's home, and that her brother reacted to her refusal to return. Text messages later released by her mother showed that her mother had warned her on 5 March not to meet her brother under any circumstances, suspecting male relatives had agitated him against her.

== Investigation and trial ==
Erbil police initially described the perpetrators only as unidentified assailants. Police spokesperson Lieutenant Colonel Hogir Aziz later said the killer was Maghdid's brother, acting with an uncle who admitted involvement. The uncle was initially arrested and the vehicle used in the killing seized, while the brother fled and became the subject of an arrest warrant. On 8 March 2022 the brother reportedly admitted to killing her during a radio interview, stating he had fired nine bullets, and he was arrested the following day in Kirkuk by anti-crime police, along with a man accused of sheltering him; his uncle was later released.

Reports of the brother's age at the time of the killing varied: some outlets described him as 17, others as 18, while Kurdistan24 described him as 22 at the time of his conviction in September 2022. Maghdid's mother later stated he was born in 2004, but had been registered as a year older on his identity documents so he could enroll in school alongside his sister, and claimed he suffered from psychological distress and had been incited and given the weapon by older relatives.

On 20 September 2022, an Erbil court convicted Maghdid's brother of the murder under Article 406 of the Iraqi Penal Code and sentenced him to 15 years in prison, while acquitting the uncle after the brother testified in court that he had acted alone. Maghdid's lawyer, Haram Rafaat, said the defence had submitted 15 points to the court that were not addressed in the verdict, including unretrieved phone call records and a timeline contradiction between police logs (reporting arrival at 11:30 PM) and forensic records (noting the body's arrival at 10:00 PM), and said the defence suspected another person might have been involved. A number of women's rights activists said they had expected a harsher sentence, such as life imprisonment.

== Reactions ==
Maghdid's death, which became widely public on International Women's Day, drew condemnation in the Kurdistan Region from Muslim and Christian religious figures and Kurdish government officials, and many of her TikTok followers expressed outrage. At the same time, some social media users in Iraqi Kurdistan defended or excused the killing, circulating older photographs of Maghdid in a hijab with comments framing her death as a consequence of leaving her faith.

Following her killing and those of other women in the region, the United States Consulate General in Erbil issued a statement expressing concern over rising violence against women in the Kurdistan Region, naming Maghdid's killing, along with those of Maryam Yacoob and Aydi Muhammed, as cases needing investigation and legal accountability. Prime Minister Masrour Barzani condemned honor killings, stating "there is no honor in honor killing", while the Jiyan Foundation for Human Rights issued a statement condemning the murder as part of a recurring pattern of gender violence.

Maghdid's case was cited by Kurdish women's rights organisations as part of a wider pattern: according to figures cited by the Kurdistan Women's Union, more than ten women and girls were killed in similar circumstances in the Kurdistan Region in the months before her death, including Doski Azad, a transgender woman shot dead by her brother weeks earlier. Kurdistan Women's Union board member Delvin Khalaf linked the killings to the continuing influence of tribal authority in the region despite government commitments to combat violence against women, while Kurdistan Parliament women's and human rights committee member Kolistan Said called for tougher penalties for "honour"-related killings.

On 8 March 2022, coinciding with International Women's Day, an unreleased song recorded by Maghdid before her death was posthumously released online. In March 2025, on the third anniversary of her murder, Kurdish media noted that her grave remained largely unvisited, describing her isolation as emblematic of the persistent social stigma surrounding victims of honor killings.

== See also ==
- Honor killing
- Doski Azad
- Persecution of Christians in Iraq
- Women's rights in Iraq
- 2022 Sulaymaniyah motorcycle rally attack
