= Rasan (organization) =

Kurdish LGBTQ and women's rights NGO

- ڕاسان
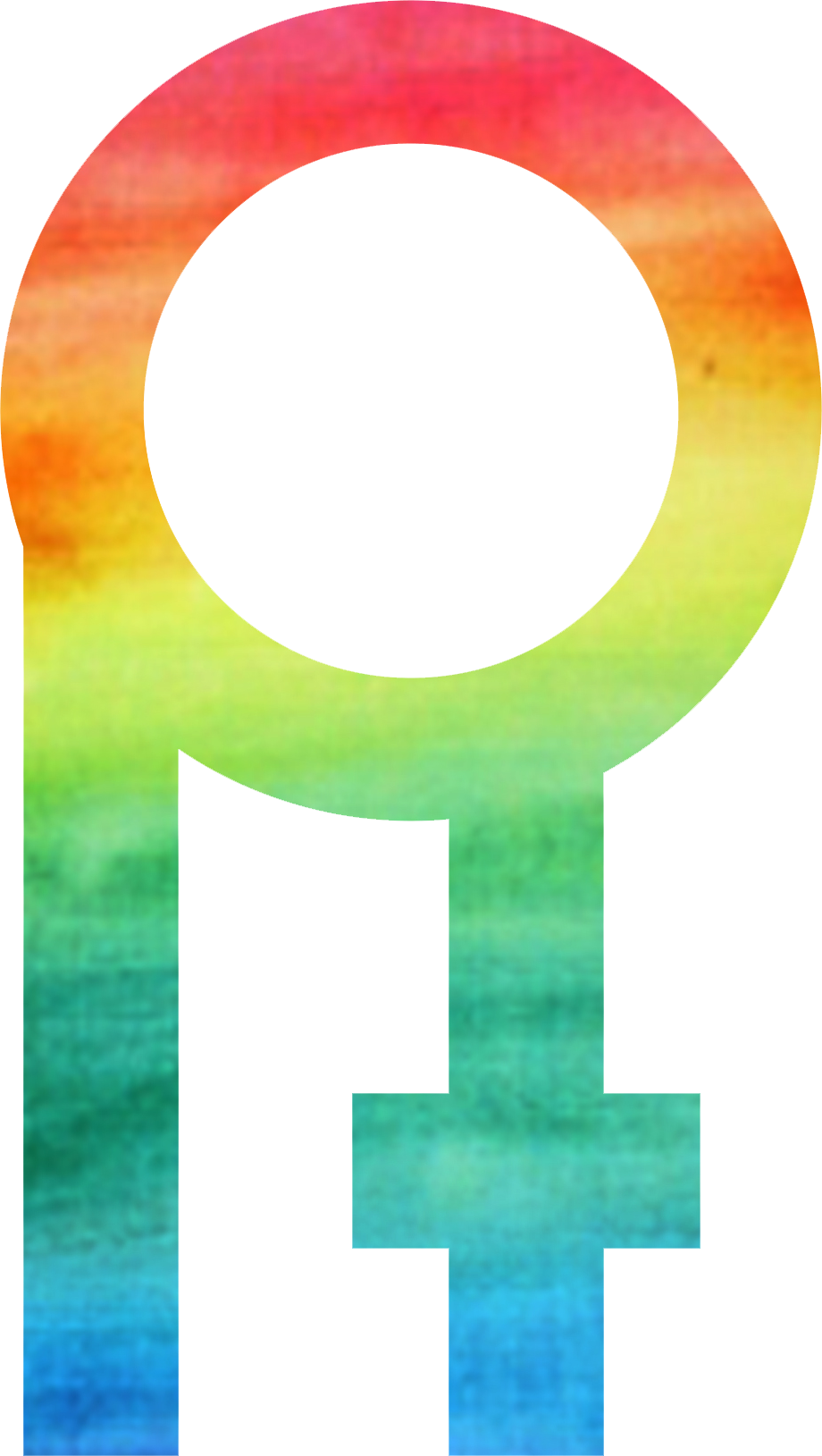
- The logo, shaped like the letter R, represents women (with the female gender symbol present) as well as the LGBTQ community (with the rainbow colors.)
- Pronunciation: IPA: [ɾɑːsɑːn] rah-san
- Formation: 2004
- Founded at: Sulaymaniyah, Kurdistan Region
- Type: NGO
- Purpose: Humanitarian
- Headquarters: Sulaymaniyah, Kurdistan, Iraq
- Services: Psychosocial support Legal aid Consultation
- Fields: Human rights (Women and LGBTQ)
- Official languages: Kurdish; English
- Executive Director: Tanya Darwesh
- Media & Communications Officer: Zhiar Ali (2019–2021)
- Affiliations: COC Nederland; Kvinna Till Kvinna; All Out; Give A Damn; Oxfam; PlanetRomeo; USAID
- Staff: 12 (2019)
- Website: rasanorg.com

Rasan (Kurdish: ڕاسان; English: /rɑːsɑːn/; lit. 'uprising') was a Kurdish non-governmental human rights organization that was established in 2004 in Sulaymaniyah, Kurdistan Region, Iraq. Rasan focused on LGBTQ rights and women's rights. The organization ran projects that focused on coexistence and social cohesion through the use of arts, social awareness, focus groups, livelihood projects, seminars, workshops, training, and action plans. Rasan engaged community leaders from different sectors in community forums on gender identity, equality and coexistence.

Initially, Rasan was a feminist women's rights organization between 2004 and 2012 but in 2012 they expanded their scope to human rights issues related to the LGBTQ community, making them the first registered organization in Iraq to publicly advocate for the LGBTQ community. The organization also campaigned against child marriage and domestic abuse. The organization was headquartered in Sulaymaniyah, which was their primary area of operation, but they campaign in Iraq and the wider Middle East using their media presence and social media platforms, pressuring the Iraqi government and the Kurdistan Regional Government (KRG) to acknowledge basic human rights which are still violated and establish laws to protect LGBTQ people and women.

The organization started awareness campaigns and group workshops for young people in Kurdish society to try to uproot the taboo of LGBTQ acceptance and the way LGBTQ communities are viewed and vilified by most of society. One of the campaigns, known as Art for All, included painting murals on public walls depicting the concerns of the LGBTQ community in Kurdistan in an attempt to sway public opinion towards a more lenient mentality. The project started in 2017 after a fundraising campaign by All Out. By the end of the project, some of the murals representing the LGBTQ community were vandalized, especially ones with rainbows, which are known as an LGBTQ symbol. They also launched the Give a Hand project during the same time, supported by Give a Damn, which was about researching the needs of the LGBTQ community and create new queer-friendly vocabulary.

Rasan was supported by multiple partners to execute their projects, including COC Nederland, Kvinna Till Kvinna, All Out, Give A Damn, Oxfam, PlanetRomeo, USAID, and Asiacell.

== History ==
=== Early days ===
Rasan was founded in 2004 as a feminist and women's rights organization. After shutting down for a year in 2011, it reopened in 2012. While continuing its work for women's rights, Rasan decided to also focus on the LGBTQ community, which was one of the biggest groups in society that still faced violence and discrimination. According to Ayaz Shalal Kado, former deputy director of Rasan, they felt something was missing and left out. Rasan was the only registered organization in Iraq to work for the LGBTQ community. (Note: Besides Rasan, the only other organization publicly working for LGBTQ rights is called IraQueer, which was found in 2015 and is not yet registered in Iraq. Rasanwasstill registered as a women's rights organization, according to the Directorate of Non-Governmental Organizations in the Kurdistan Region, because registering as an LGBTQ organization was not allowed. According to the Austrian Centre for Country of Origin and Asylum Research and other parties, the region in which Rasan operates is safer and more tolerable to LGBTQ people than the rest of Iraq. Other registered organizations outside of the Kurdistan Region, such as in the south of Iraq in Baghdad, have a more difficult time working for LGBTQ rights and are often targeted. This claim is disputed, and some parties say the Kurdistan Region is equally as hostile towards members of the LGBTQ community. According to a report by UNHCR, Kurdish society still has tribal values and believes in gender roles and family honor, which restricts the freedom of LGBTQ people in the area. In Baghdad, LGBTQ people have been targets of killing squads using dating apps. In 2009, human rights activists estimated 680 LGBTQ people were murdered during a five-year period, at a rate of about a dozen per month.)

=== 2005–2012 ===
In 2005, a constitutional awareness project for women was held in Erbil, which was hosted around many districts of the region. The project was supported by Iraq Civil Society and Independent Media Support Program (ICSP) for two months. Later in 2005, 35 lectures were held over three months on topics including social and political issues, and women's health. This project was also supported by ICSP. Between 2006 and 2010, the organization published 85 press releases but stopped publishing after 2010. They also published a book titled "Women at Third World", which is about violence and harassment against women. The organization also hosted television shows covering violence against women, gender equality, and human and civil rights.

In 2007, Rasan produced a film about female genital mutilation. The production was supported by Human Rights Watch and was displayed in Erbil, Duhok, Kirkuk, Ranya, and Said Sadiq. The film entered a competition for Best Films by the Ministry of Human Rights in the Kurdistan region, and was nominated for display in Germany. In 2008, the organization worked on 55 cases, in 2009 on 62 cases, and in 2010 on 60 cases, which were mainly about social, political, ideological, or family problems faced by women. The organization hosted activities from 2007 to 2012, including the World Conference of NGOs in Washington, D.C., EU Conference of NGOs in Austria, KTK Workshops in Amman, KTK Workshops in Lebanon, Summit of Social Entrepreneurs in Istanbul, and Summit of Women Rights Defenders in South Africa. Rasan then took a short hiatus and resumed its work after adding LGBTQ issues to its focus.

=== 2012–2018 ===
Rasan started planning a project that included activism and advocacy for the LGBTQ community in 2012. COC funded the project as part of their Pride Program. The project was called "Crossing Iraqi Rainbow" and ran from 2016 until the end of 2020. The objectives of the project varied by year. Rasan was able to hold workshops, training, seminars, group discussions and community forums. The participants of the workshops were mainly from governmental sectors and institutions, the Ministry of Health, Asayish, police, Ministry of Endowments and Religious Affairs, youth, and university students.

in 2016, Rasan executed a series of large-scale projects, one of which was 16 Days of Activism, where the organization started spreading anti-child-marriage posters around Sulaymaniyah and painting artwork reflecting gender equality, peace, women's rights, and coexistence. Another project, We Care About You, which was executed from July to September 2016, aimed to provide protection and assistance for female refugees, Internally displaced persons, and host communities. The project concluded with 60 women having direct access to education, 750 women receiving training on gender-based violence (GBV); community forms of 50% female and 50% male were established to receive support to develop and implement community GBV action plans for 1,500 indirect beneficiaries. As part of the Women Can Be project, Rasan provided direct psychosocial and legal support to 200 women, 1,200 women received hygienic kits, and 50 seminars were hosted for men to raise awareness about healthy relationships and gender equality.

On March 1, 2017, Rasan announced its 1325 project. Four hundred cases were provided with direct legal, psychosocial and social support. Rasan also hosted 80 awareness seminars to 1,000 women. In 2019, Rasan hosted 11 seminars for 250 women from Chamchamal, Kalar, Arbat Camp, and Khabat Districts.

Another Rasan campaign involved working with 90 women who were either freed by or had fled from ISIS rapists and human traffickers. Rasan worked with women who were abused by ISIS militias. According to sources, Rasanwastrying to procure more backing from international organizations to help more people, especially women and children who have fled ISIS and require mental and physical therapy.

==== Art for All ====
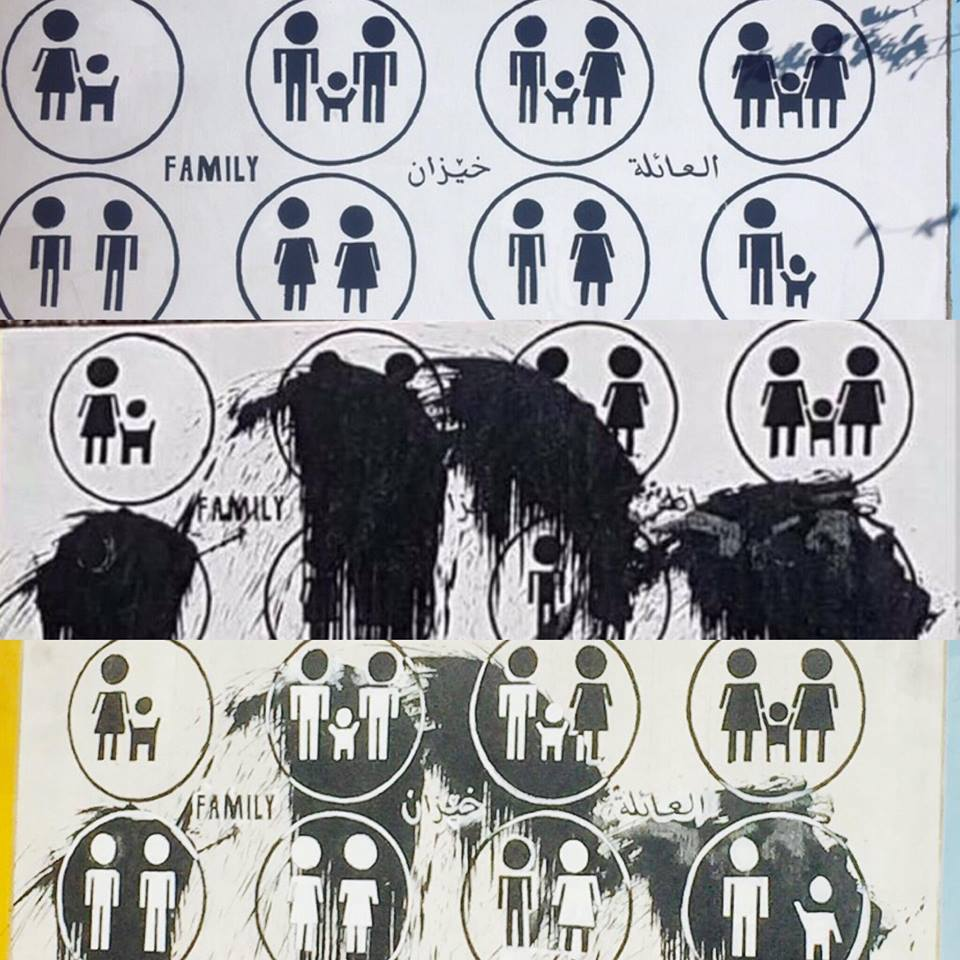
A mural representing gender equality which was vandalized and then fixed by Rasan as a countermeasure

In 2017, Rasan launched a campaign called "Art for All" to paint murals around the city of Sulaymaniyah; it was their first public advocacy for the LGBTQ community. The project was funded from a fundraising campaign supported by All Out. Some of the murals, which represented the LGBTQ community, were defaced with black paint but Rasan repainted them. Although the authorities, fearing a backlash from locals and religious believers with strong opinions, did not allow Rasan to paint all of their murals on public main roads. Rasan also painted murals on high-school walls and The American University of Iraq, Sulaimani. Although the murals were not on public roads, there was an aggressive backlash against Rasan for their advocacy. Rasan received many negative reactions, including messages containing excessive profanity and death threats from individuals who believed Rasan was trying to spread indecency and immorality, and some of the organization's staff have been assaulted in public. The project was also challenged heavily by governmental institutions, with authorities threatening the project manager with arrest. This project ended on November 16, 2018.

==== Give a Hand ====
In 2018, Rasan was financially backed by the Give A Damn organization for the "Give a Hand" project to research the needs and challenges of the local LGBTQ community. The project aimed to help the organization devise a plan to meet the community's needs and to develop new LGBTQ-related words in the Sorani language to expand the community's vocabulary. According to Give A Damn, "the support [was] also used to work on community-building and to identify allies such as imams, police officers, and policymakers."

=== 2018–Present ===
Former deputy director of Rasan, Kado, talked to SBS Kurdish about the organization's work and the way they work to break social taboos, educate the community, and help women and the LGBTQ community with their struggles. Shalal told SBS Kurdish Rasan is one of a very few organizations working for LGBTQ people in the Kurdistan region, and in Iraq as a whole. "We have case management services, where LGBTQ individuals can visit our organization or can connect with us on different applications through their phones, or on Facebook, or on Twitter, or by email to ask for physiological, social, and legal services that Rasan provides". Despite the economic and political crisis in the Kurdistan region, Rasan continued its advocacy campaigns. Kado said if they had more support, they would expand their activities into other parts of the region, including Kirkuk.

In 2020, Rasan launched a Youth Development Project, which includes six days of training about human rights, gender and sexuality, and Sexual and reproductive health and rights. The participants were asked to become volunteers for the organization.

==== Response to COVID-19 ====
in Iraq, where there are no laws protecting LGBTQ communities, conservative groups and religious militants are currently the main threat to the LGBTQ people's lives. The spread of COVID-19 has seen a rise in the religious leaders' anti-LGBTQ speeches and further danger to the lives of LGBTQ people, especially in countries where ideological groups such as the Shi'ite, which have militias. There has been instances where influential figures in Iraq blamed the spread of COVID-19 on LGBTQ people.

On May 17, 2020, the European Union (EU), British, and Canadian embassies raised the pride flag in their Baghdad headquarters, which caused a massive backlash, forcing the EU embassy to take down the flag after a few hours. Muqtada al-Sadir had earlier called for an end to violence against members of the LGBTQ community; according to a report written by Zhiar Ali for Rasan, he was one of the most influential people to start a hate campaign against the community, declaring homosexuality a "paraphilia" and comparing it to incest. Iraqi politicians soon started an unsuccessful campaign to expel the EU embassy out of Iraq.

"Muqtada al-Sadir is clearly calling on the public and summoning everyone to take action to stop the "spread" of homosexuality. This has caused the public to feel further outraged by the situation and have resorted to violence against LGBT people and a crackdown has begun to find them and murder them. However, this has not been the only call to start a hate campaign. On a broadcasted footage to national TV, a group of people is walking over LGBT flags and condemning the community and proclaim as though they are abnormal or homosexuality is some sort of disease." –Rasan

According to Ali, since Muqtada al-Sadir posted discriminatory tweets, a number of LGBTQ youth have been killed in a hate campaign. Ali reported the appearance of "digital jihadists" who pose as LGBTQ people online to out real members of the community, making them vulnerable targets of murder attempts and harm. The group would search on gay-dating apps such as Grindr, and check the followers of local pro-LGBTQ groups and persuade them reveal their identities. After these events unfolded, Rasan started aggressively targeting the EU and UN on their social media accounts, letting the public know that they were not supported by them in fear that it would damage their reputation, labeling them as "opportunistic tokenists". Rasan also led a media campaign against the Iraqi government for not taking action and criticized Muqtada al-Sadir for his discrimination against LGBTQ people. In an interview with Rudaw, Rasan said; "as usual, Iraqi politicians continue fooling their nation and escaping responsibility. It is embarrassing and surprising for a figure like Muqtada al-Sadr to be unaware of what is going on and rather blame a marginalized group of society for being the source of COVID-19."

== Legal challenges ==
Iraq has no laws to help or provide legal protection for LGBT individuals, despite continuous attacks on the LGBTQ community. The lack of condemnation by the media or public figures does not help the escalating situations in the Iraqi region. There are still problems with self-expression for to LGBTQ people, whose freedoms are restricted. Ambiguous articles in the Iraqi Penal Code, overly-broadly written public morality-type laws, such as articles 393, 394, 400, and 401 in the Kurdistan region, and articles 376, 394, 398, 397, 402, 403, 502 in Iraq are abused to detain LGBTQ people in the region.

Legally, sexual relations, whether homosexual or heterosexual, are not criminalized, but there are numerous reports about executions and floggings carried out in places controlled by militias and religious militants. Since the Kurdistan region has autonomy status, they have adopted their own laws which do not criminalize same-sex relations, but some LGBTQ people are arrested regardless. (Note: According to the Kurdish Penal Code on sexual misconduct, in case the sexual relation did not violate any of the following 6 conditions, the sexual relation is legal: 1. Mutual consent must be present; 2. Involved individuals should not be married; 3. Both parties must be at least 18 years old; 4. The act should not be in a public place where it can be witnessed; 5. There should not be any promises of marriage before the act; and; 6. The sex should be done outside of prostitution and free of charge.)

On February 22, 2021, it was announced that a lawsuit was filed against Rasan by an MP of an Islamist political faction called Komal (Kurdistan Justice Group) locally because the organization advocated for LGBTQ+ rights locally, and according to him, this was a "against the values of the Kurdish culture." In response to his accusations, Rasan said they will be defending themselves against the lawsuit in court, and that they work for all humanity. Zhiar Ali, former media officer at Rasan, spoke up against the MP during a live interview with Rudaw, defending the LGBTQ+ community, saying that the comments of the MP were "baseless and not based on any scientific evidence." As a response to the threats that the organization will be closed down, Ali started a change.org petition through his initiative Yeksani which was signed by over 1,000 people, including national and local activists.

On 20 June 2023, reports indicated that Rasan Organization had been dissolved by the Suleimani Court of First Instance for "illegally" advocating for the rights of LGBTQ people, adding that the decision was final because the time limit for an appeal had already expired.

== See also ==
- Zhiar Ali
- Human rights in Iraqi Kurdistan
- Human rights in Muslim-majority countries
- Human rights in post-invasion Iraq
- Sexual taboo in the Middle East
- LGBTQ people and Islam
- LGBTQ rights in Iraq
- LGBTQ rights in the Middle East
