= Zhiar Ali =

Kurdish human rights activist and artist

- ژیار عەلی
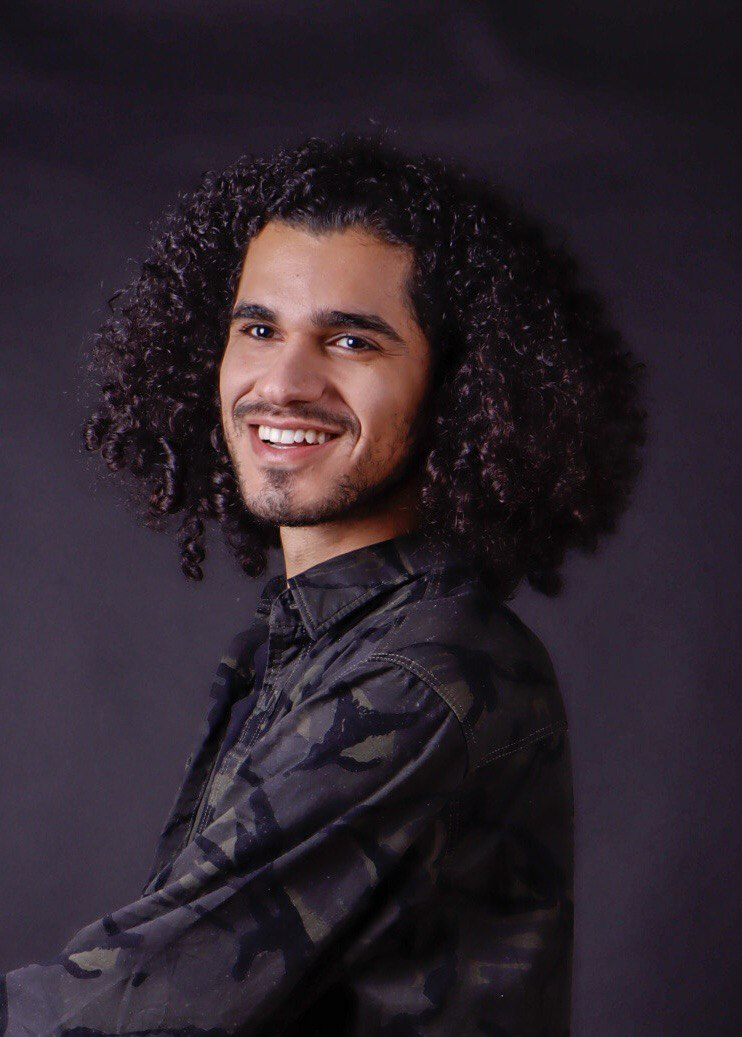
- Ali in 2022
- Pronunciation: /ʒiːɑːɾ/
- Born: September 2, 1999 (age 27); Sulaymaniyah
- Occupations: Human rights defender, singer-songwriter, animal rights advocate
- Years active: 2017–present
- Organizations: KVO (2017–2019); Rasan (2019–2021); Yeksani (2021–present)
- Known for: LGBT activism

Zhiar Ali (Kurdish: Jiyar Elî; Sorani alphabet: ژیار عەلی, Kurdish pronunciation: [ʒiːɑːɾ], born September 2, 1999) is a former animal rights activist and a Kurdish advocate for LGBT rights. He presently resides in the Netherlands after having been based in Sulaymaniyah, Iraq. In Iraqi Kurdistan, Ali is known for his contributions to LGBT rights, including founding Yeksani, a group that works to promote LGBT rights in the Kurdistan Region, of which he is executive director. He was previously a founding member of Kurdistan Vegans, Iraq's first pro-vegan animal rights group, and has worked as a freelance journalist.

Ali has been outspoken in his criticism of the Kurdistan Regional Government (KRG) for failing to appropriately address abuses of the LGBT population in the Kurdistan region, and has reported receiving threats over his activism. He came to wider attention in 2021 for his campaigning during the arrests of people suspected of being gay by security forces in Sulaymaniyah, and following the murder of Doski Azad in 2022. Since 2022, he has also released music as an independent singer-songwriter.

== Personal life ==
In a 2017 interview with makanati.net, he revealed that he came out as gay to his mother and older sister that same year, and that this was around the same time he founded Lava Foundation, an unregistered organisation working to raise awareness about LGBT issues. Lava's media activities were absorbed into Rasan before the organisation went dormant due to a lawsuit that demanded the organisation be shut down for promoting LGBT human rights. Ali then founded Yeksani to independently continue his activism.

In addition to his activism for LGBT rights, Ali also advocated for a plant-based lifestyle. In 2018, he co-founded Kurdistan Vegans, an organisation promoting environmentalism and a vegan lifestyle in Iraq. As a vegan, Ali has spoken about the challenges of maintaining a vegan diet in Iraq, where vegan products are often scarce, difficult to find, and overpriced.

Ali also releases music independently as a singer-songwriter.

== Career ==
Ali started his advocacy career in 2017 when he established the Lava Foundation, a group devoted to promoting LGBT causes. He was hired by Rasan, a group tackling related challenges, in late 2019, and Lava Foundation's initiatives were absorbed into Rasan. After working with Rasan for more than a year, Ali made the decision to leave the organisation and launch Yeksani, a movement dedicated to promoting LGBT rights in the Kurdistan Region.

He previously served as the project manager of Kurdistan Vegans, where he organised and coordinated World Vegan Day events for two consecutive years. He has also written as a freelance journalist on music and on political and social issues, including conflict in the Middle East and LGBT rights in Iraq, for a local independent news outlet.

=== LGBT Activism ===
Through his activism, Ali hopes to increase public knowledge of the struggles the local LGBT population faces, bring these issues to the attention of national and international actors to spur action, and seek to integrate the group into Kurdish society. He has stressed that due to a lack of public awareness and understanding, the living conditions for LGBT+ people in Kurdistan are subpar. In June 2020, Ali spoke about the situation of LGBT people in Iraq at the Global Pride event hosted by InterPride.

I do not care what Kurdish leaders are tweeting or saying to consulates and embassies in meetings, we do not need their 'deep concern' and tokenistic efforts; we need real action. We need legislation. We want representation in politics, – Ali to Middle East Eye in an interview.

As an LGBT rights activist, Zhiar Ali uses social media as a key tool for raising awareness and promoting change. In an interview with BBC Persian, he highlighted legal loopholes, particularly Articles 393, 394, 400, and 401 of the Iraqi Penal Code, that he says are misused to unlawfully detain and persecute members of the LGBT community.

==== Rasan lawsuit ====
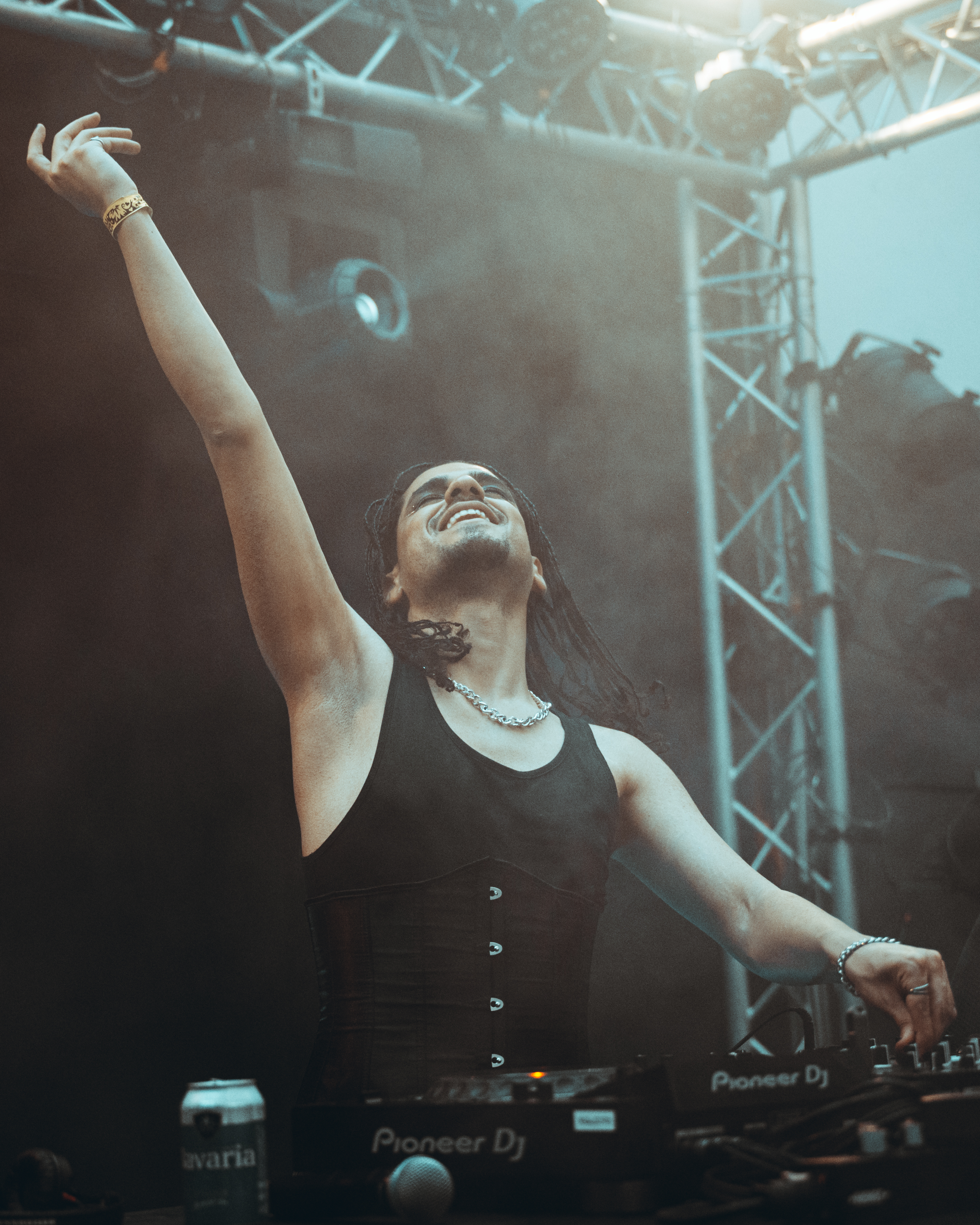
Ali performing at Apoqalypse on May 3, 2025

On February 22, 2021, it was announced that a lawsuit had been filed against Rasan by a member of the Islamist Kurdistan Justice Group, who argued that the organization's advocacy for local LGBT+ rights was "against the values of the Kurdish culture." In response, Rasan stated that they would defend themselves against the lawsuit in court and that they work for the rights of all individuals equally. Ali spoke out against the MP, describing the accusations as "baseless and not based on any scientific evidence."

In 2022, a bill was proposed in the Kurdistan Region's parliament that would ban advocacy for LGBT rights, punishable by fines and imprisonment. Ali was among the activists who condemned the bill, telling Middle East Eye: "We will no longer be able to speak out about the discrimination and violence we face without the fear of being prosecuted."

==== Asayish operation ====
On April 1, 2021 news broke that the Kurdish security forces, known as Asayish, had set up checkpoints in Sulaymaniyah and arrested a number of individuals suspected of being gay. Despite widespread public condemnation of the operation on social media, it received support from a group of seventeen members of Sulaymaniyah's Provincial Council who signed a petition in its favor.

In response to the arrests, Ali, the executive director of Yeksani, launched an online campaign called "Take Action" which aimed to bring the arrests to the attention of international actors. Organisations and bodies that commented on the operation included Amnesty International, the US Consulate in Erbil, Human Rights Watch, and ILGA Asia. The arrests, and Ali's account of them, were later documented in the UK Home Office's country policy and information note on the treatment of LGBTI people in Iraq.

According to Ali, the operation led to the arrest of 15 individuals, some of whom were underage, and security checkpoints were set up in places known to be popular among the LGBT community. Ali and other activists said that the operation was later rebranded as a crackdown on prostitution to avoid backlash, after the Asayish stated that the arrests targeted prostitution and did not "target any specific groups of society." He criticised reports that security forces had attempted to force those arrested to undergo physical examinations. He also told Middle East Eye that even if some individuals had resorted to sex work, the government bore responsibility for failing to provide the LGBT community with other means of livelihood.

Throughout the operation, Ali repeatedly warned the media that the lives of the community were in danger, and called on the public and international organisations to pressure the Kurdish government to release the detainees and stop the operation. Following pressure from civil-rights organisations and activists, the detainees were reported released. Ali and other activists maintained that the operation had targeted the LGBT community and described the Asayish statement as a cover-up.

As a result of the discrimination and the operation, Ali reported that many LGBT people, including himself, felt excluded from Kurdish society.

==== Justice for Doski Azad ====
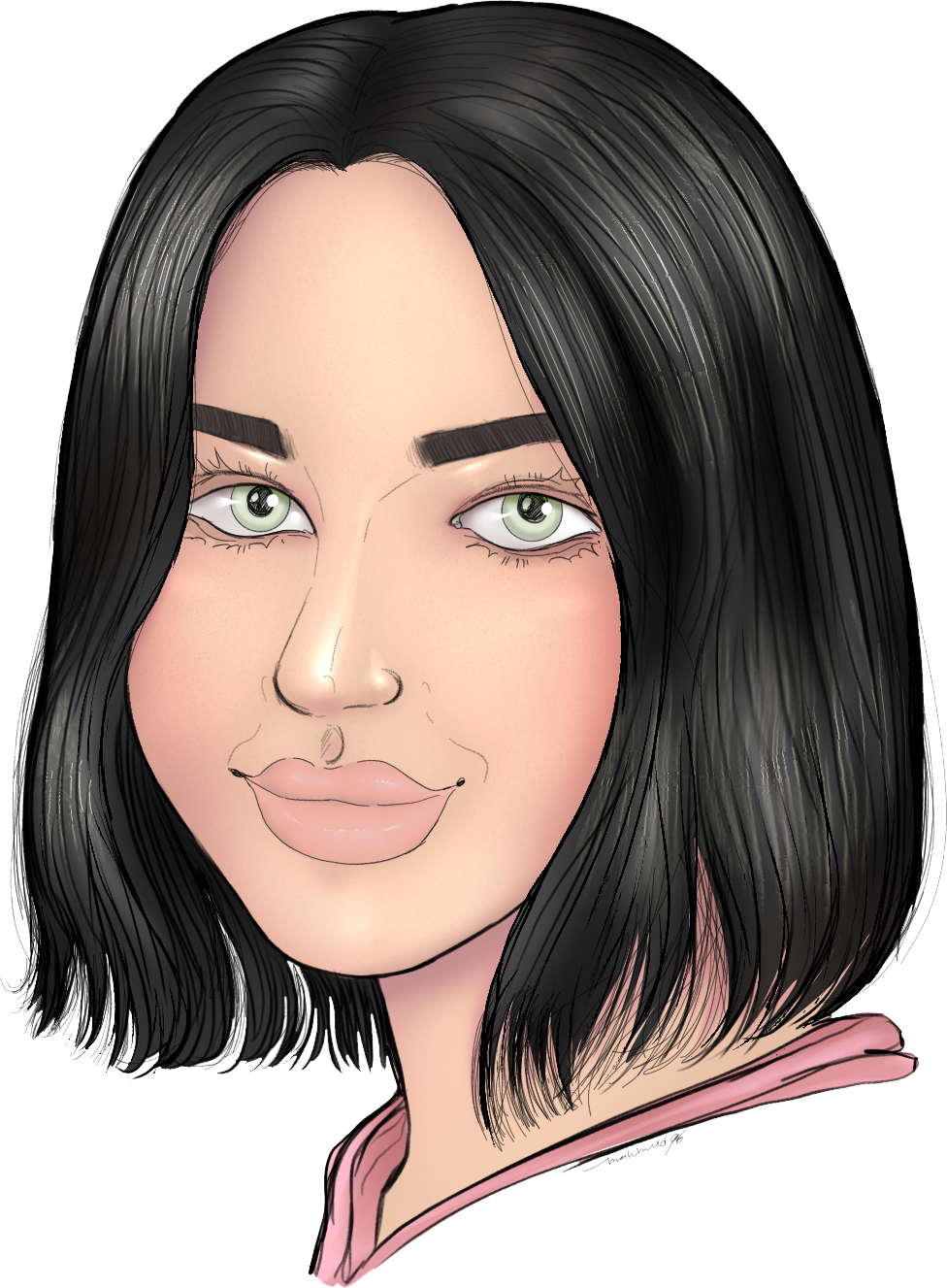
Drawing of Doski Azad by Kurdish artist Colby.

Ali has spoken out against the Kurdish government's failure to publicly denounce the murder of Doski Azad, one of the region's few publicly transgender women, whose body was discovered on January 31, 2022. Ali emphasised his dissatisfaction with the government's response in an interview with Al Monitor, saying that the LGBT community is highly concerned about the ongoing breaches of their human rights in the region.

He also drew parallels between Azad's murder and that of Misho, a transgender internet personality who was killed by her brother the previous year, and called on the Kurdish regional government to take stronger action to prevent such killings. He highlighted that honour killings are prevalent in the Kurdistan Region and that Azad's case is one of many, pointing out that living openly as an LGBT person in Iraq is very dangerous due to the risks of being targeted.

==== Housing and occupational discrimination ====
During an interview, Ali discussed the difficulties with being part of the LGBT+ community and finding housing, reporting that many LGBT+ youth are denied rent or properties are not sold to them, so they are forced to marry the opposite gender to obtain a residence. He also talked about how the Directorate of Non-Governmental Organizations have made it impossible to register LGBT organizations in the region. Yeksani has also reported occupational discrimination against LGBT individuals and has called for anti-discrimination legislation.

==== Selected activist bibliography ====
- Ali, Zhiar (June 7, 2020). "Conditions of LGBT people of Iraq since may 17, 2020". Rasan. Archived from the original on October 29, 2020.

== See also ==
- Rasan
- IraQueer
- Human rights in Kurdistan Region
- LGBT in Islam
- LGBT rights in Iraq
