= 2022 Sulaymaniyah motorcycle rally attack =

2022 crime in Iraq

- Location: Hawana, Sulaymaniyah, Kurdistan Region, Iraq
- Date: 30 December 2022
- Attack type: Mob assault, mass harassment
- Weapon: Knives
- Injuries: 2
- Victim: Three girls (one 17-year-old)
- Perpetrator: Unnamed
- No. of participants: Mob assault by a crowd of between dozens to hundreds of boys and men (19 arrested)

On 30 December 2022, a 17-year-old girl was chased and attacked by a crowd of hundreds of men and teenage boys in the Hawana area of Sulaymaniyah, in the Kurdistan Region of Iraq, after attending an informal motorcycle stunt-riding gathering. Video of the attack, in which she was chased and kicked, circulated widely on social media and prompted condemnation from Kurdistan Regional Government officials and women's rights groups. Sulaimani police arrested 16 people within a day, rising to 19 by 2 January 2023.

== Background ==
Motorbike riders gathered weekly in the Hawana area of Sulaymaniyah for informal stunt shows. Women had previously attended these gatherings, but organisers had recently begun excluding them. Sulaimani police spokesman Sarkawt Ahmed said the girl was a Sulaymaniyah resident who had attended the gathering before, as were all of those initially arrested. The girl was Iranian. Kurdistan 24 reported that her participation in the gathering caused a dispute among the organisers before she was attacked by a group of boys.

== Attack ==
Ahmed said three girls were harassed at the event on 30 December, but video of only one of them, then aged 17, spread online and became the basis of the case. Arab News and Kurdistan 24 described dozens of young men and teenage boys chasing her, while LBC described the crowd that surrounded her as hundreds of men. Footage showed the crowd chasing her before some of them kicked and beat her against a car; her injuries were not considered life-threatening. A man who intervened on her behalf was stabbed.

Eyewitnesses described the assault as carried out in an "uncivilized and ugly" manner. Footage of the attack also showed assailants insulting the girl's clothing.

== Investigation ==
Police arrested 16 men within a day of the attack; those detained confessed to taking part, and weapons were confiscated from them. Weapons found on some detainees included machetes, knives, and daggers.

Three of the detainees had filmed the attack themselves and posted it online. On 2 January 2023, police said three more people had been arrested, bringing the total to 19, and that the girl had filed a lawsuit against several of those involved. Police also said they planned to shut down the unlicensed rally site.

== Reactions ==
Kurdistan Region Prime Minister Masrour Barzani condemned the attack in a statement, calling it "shameful, inexcusable and completely unacceptable," and said he had spoken with the interior and justice ministers to investigate and hold those responsible accountable.

The Kurdistan Regional Government called the attack "disgraceful". Government spokesman Jotiar Adil said it followed a separate assault in Sulaymaniyah province days earlier and that "these incidents are unacceptable." Rewaz Faeq, Speaker of the Kurdistan Parliament, said the assault was the result of "a barbaric narrative used systematically against our women." Journalist Dilan Sirwan called it "a pure failure of education" in the region.

The attack drew renewed attention to gender-based violence in Sulaymaniyah, a city often described as one of the more socially liberal in the Kurdistan Region. A local anti-trafficking and women's rights foundation recorded at least 24 women killed in gender-based violence in the region in the first half of 2022. The case was also covered by Arab outlets including Al Jazeera and Sky News Arabia.

== See also ==
- Violence against women in Iraq
- Murder of Eman Sami Maghdid
