= Killing of Noor Alsaffar =

Death of Iraqi social media influencer

- Date: September 2023
- Location: Mansour district, Baghdad, Iraq
- Motive: Suspected LGBTQ+ hate crime
- Deaths: 1

In September 2023, Iraqi social media personality Noor Alsaffar, known as Noor BM, (b. 2000), was shot three times by a gunman in the Mansour district of Baghdad, killing him.

As of April 2024, no one had been charged for the murder and the crime is "under investigation".

== Background ==
In 2020, during an interview with the Alwalaa channel, Alsaffar described himself as a cross-dresser, stating that: "I’m not transgender and I’m not gay. I don’t have other tendencies, I’m only a cross-dresser and a model." This led to online abuse. At the time of his murder in 2023, Alsaffar had over 370,000 followers on TikTok and Instagram, which were mostly used to post beauty and Get Ready With Me content.

== Killing ==
Alsaffar's killing took place during the day, and was recorded on neighbouring CCTV.

== Reactions ==
IraQueer, an Iraqi LGBTQ+ rights group, condemned the killing of "the queer Iraqi vlogger Nour BM". Remembering Our Dead, a website supporting Trans Day of Remembrance, described Alsaffar as "gender-nonconforming", but stated that how Alsaffar viewed their gender at the time of their death is not known.

The shooting is one of several targeted attacks on social media personalities in Iraq, some of whom were identified as members of LGBTQ+ communities. It is part of a wider increase in homophobia and transphobia in Iraq, which includes the burning of the rainbow flag, a ban on media organisations in using the term 'homosexuality' – stipulating that 'sexual deviance' should be used instead, the criminalisation of same-sex relationships, and the deliberate digital targeting of LGBTQ+ people.

== See also ==
- Killing of Umm Fahad, homicide of another Iraqi social media personality
