= Kerstin Grebäck =

Swedish peace actiist (born 1942)

- Born: June 19, 1942; Sweden
- Occupations: Peace activist, organizational leader
- Known for: International peace advocacy, leadership in WILPF and women’s peace movements

Kerstin Grebäck (born June 19, 1942) is a Swedish peace activist and leader in international women's peace movements. She is especially involved in the Women’s International League for Peace and Freedom (WILPF).

== Career ==
Grebäck has held key leadership roles in international peace organizations, primarily WILPF. She was the founding secretary-general of Kvinna till Kvinna Foundation, a Swedish organization that helps women rebuild their societies after war. Kvinna till Kvinna was funded by the Swedish International Development Cooperation Agency. The budget was over 12m krona (in 2025).

Grebäck was involved in nuclear disarmament.

Grebäck feels that military buildup often negatively impacts the unemployed and underprivileged.

== Achievements ==
- 1985 - Leader in Great Peace Journey
- 1990 - Secretary-General, Swedish WILPF
- 1993 - Headed Women for Women
- 2002 - Received Right Livelihood Award for the Kvinna till Kvinna Foundation
- 2011 - International Co-President, WILPF
