= Killing of Umm Fahad =

Iraqi influencer (1996–2024)

Umm Fahad
- أم فهد
- Born: Ghufran Mahdi Sawadi; January 1, 1996; Iraq
- Died: April 26, 2024 (aged 28); Zayouna, Baghdad, Iraq
- Cause of death: Shot by motorbike gunman
- Occupations: TikTok personality, Internet influencer
- Known for: TikTok and Instagram videos
- Notable work: Dance videos on TikTok
- Criminal charges: Producing indecent videos
- Criminal penalty: 6 months in prison (2019)

Umm Fahad (Note: Alternatively spelled Um Farad (alternatively known as Um Fahad)) (Arabic: أم فهد; born Ghufran Mahdi Sawadi (Arabic: غفران مهدي سوادي; 1996 – 26 April 2024) was an Iraqi Tik-Tok personality and internet influencer.

Umm Fahad posted videos on Tik-Tok and on Instagram, often of her dancing to music. Some videos were deemed inappropriate by the Iraqi judiciary and she was once sentenced to six months in prison for "producing and publishing several films and videos containing obscene and indecent language, violating public decency and morals" according to the Iraqi Penal Code. Iraqi laws prohibited certain videos containing what the country's authorities deemed as things that violate public decency and morals, including "obscene or indecent language".

== Death ==
Umm Fahad was shot to death on 26 April 2024, in her Cadillac Escalade outside her house in Zayouna, eastern Baghdad by a motorbike gunman also wounding a female friend. She was 28 years old. Footage of her death was caught on a surveillance camera. Authenticity of the 44 second video was confirmed by a Baghdad police source. Iraq's Interior Minister announced that an investigation into her death would be launched.

Her death was one in a series of violent deaths of social media influencers in Iraq, including that in September 2023 of Noor Alsaffar (Noor BM).
