= Kvinna till Kvinna =

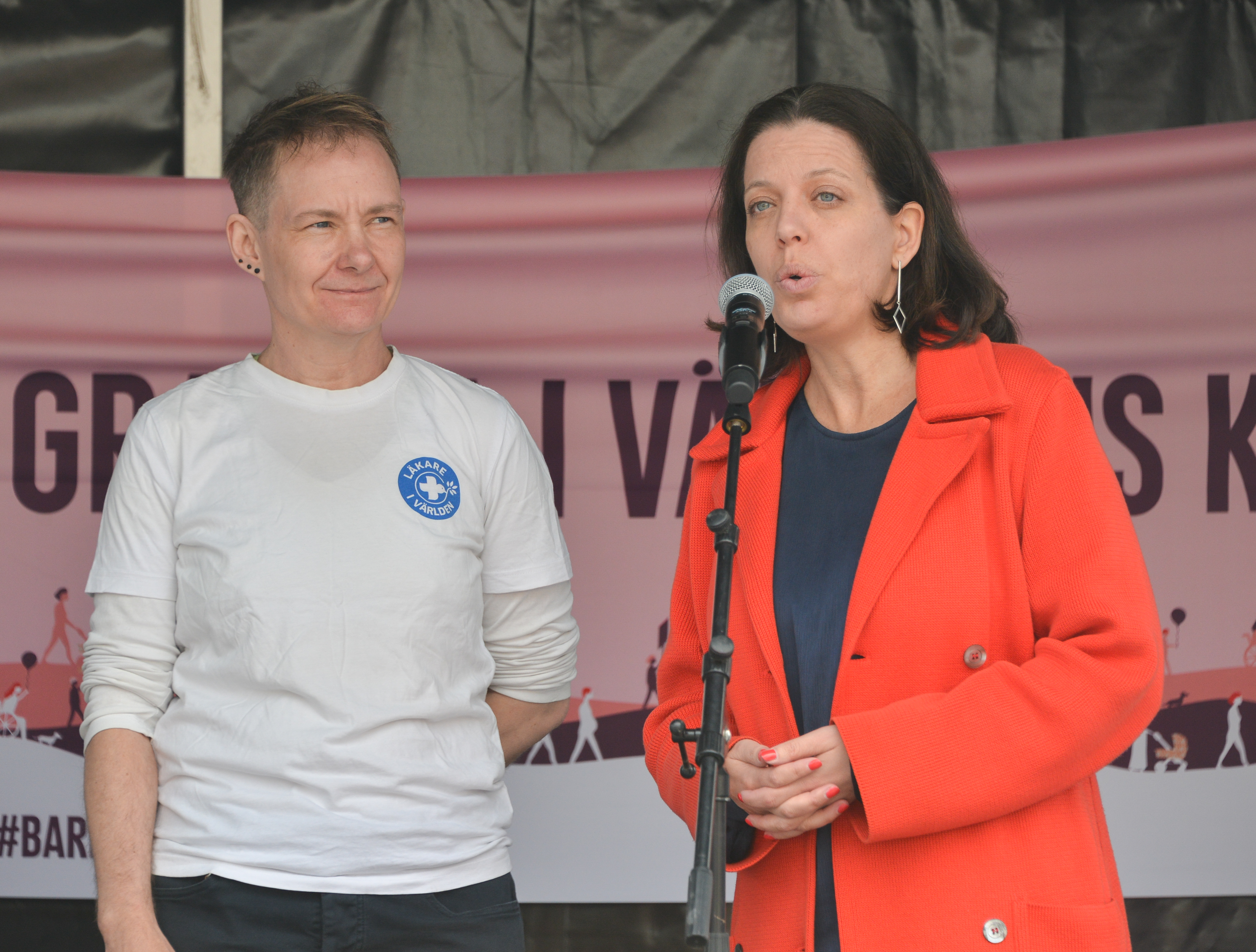
Secretary General Petra Tötterman Andorff speaking in Stockholm 2019 ahead of the Stroller March. Left: Eliot Wieslander

The Kvinna till Kvinna Foundation (English: Woman to Woman) is a Swedish organization founded in 1993 as a result of the Yugoslav Wars. It supports women in the Balkans and it received the Right Livelihood Award in 2002.

== Description ==
It supports women in war and conflict zones with a strong concentration on the Balkans, but is also active in the Middle East and the Caucasus. It works closely together with the people who live in these areas, because Kvinna till Kvinna believes that democracy can only be built by their inhabitants. The organizations' role is simply to support these women, who are often also gathered in organizations, to build up democracy on the basis of their own needs.

In 2002, Kvinna till Kvinna received the Right Livelihood Award "for its successes in addressing ethnic hatred by helping war-torn women to be the major agents of peace-building and reconciliation." Kerstin Grebäck who had been the organisations founding President in 1993, received the award for the foundation.

The organisation publishes "Women’s Rights in Western Balkans" which documents the state of women in politics, gender-based violence, the security of women human rights defenders and women in work in the Western Balkans. It was in its sixth edition in 2022 and Kvinna till Kvinna were meeting the think tank European Stability Initiative to discuss improved key indicators for the region.

Kvinna till Kvinna is funded by the Swedish International Development Cooperation Agency and in 2002 it said that administration consumed less than 20% of their costs. They still fund raised as it helped if only to target their work. The budget was over 12m krona (in 2025). Its funding and disbursements are open data.
