= LGBTQ rights in Iraq =

- Iraq
- Legal status: Illegal explicitly since 2024
- Penalty: Prison sentences up to 15 years
- Gender identity: No
- Military: Same-sex military service banned since 2007
- Discrimination protections: None

Family rights
- Recognition of relationships: No recognition of same-sex unions
- Adoption: No

Lesbian, gay, bisexual, transgender, and queer (LGBTQ) people in Iraq face severe challenges not experienced by non-LGBTQ residents. Openly LGBTQ individuals are subject to criminal penalties under the 2024 law making homosexual relations punishable by up to 15 years in prison with fines and deportation; the 2024 law also criminalizes and makes punishable by prison time promoting homosexuality, doctors performing gender-affirming surgery, and men "deliberately acting like women". Discrimination is also widespread. Openly gay men are not permitted to serve in the military and same-sex marriage or civil unions are illegal. LGBTQ people do not have any legal protections against discrimination and are frequently victims of vigilante justice and honor killings.

Following British occupation of Iraq, very strict sodomy laws were put in place. These laws allowed discrimination, harassment, and murders of members within the Iraqi LGBTQ community. Once Iraqi independence was achieved, these laws still remained. In recent years, leaders within Iraq have spoken out about reducing sodomy laws within the country. Regardless of the reduced laws, discrimination, harassment, and murders of LGBTQ community members still persist.

The Iraqi government has maintained an anti-LGBTQ stance since gaining independence in 1932 where homosexuality was officially banned. This would be expanded in the IRCC Resolution 234 of 2001 which would punish sodomy, or any homosexual act, with the death penalty. Due to harsh stigma against people who are LGBTQ, many activist organizations find themselves at a crossroads of whether to focus on building tolerance in Iraq, or instead focusing on ensuring safety or asylum for the LGBTQ communities. In 2024, there were plans to make homosexual relations in Iraq punishable by up to death but the law was revised before being quietly passed later that year to lower the punishment to 15 years in jail with fines and deportation.

== LGBT history in Iraq and the legality of same-sex sexual activity ==
=== Ancient Mesopotamia ===
In the Epic of Gilgamesh, which was composed in the Mesopotamian kingdom of Sumer, the relationship between the main protagonist Gilgamesh and the character Enkidu has been seen by some to be homosexual in nature.

The Šumma ālu, an Akkadian tablet, includes this code, where it regards male homosexuality in a positive light:

If a man copulates with his equal from the rear, he becomes the leader among his peers and brothers.

In the ancient Assyrian society, the Almanac of Incantations featured prayers praising the equality of love between heterosexual and gay male couples. A man had the rights to visit any gay prostitute or sleep with another man, just as long as false rumors or rape were not involved. Nevertheless, a man taking the submissive role was perceived negatively in ancient Mesopotamia.

A particular Middle Assyrian Law Code from Assur, dating from 1,075 BC, condemns homosexual rape or forced sex. It speaks of a "seignior" (high social figure in the community) and his "neighbor" (someone of equal social status):

If a seignior [an Assyrian man] lay with his neighbor [another citizen], when they have prosecuted him (and) convicted him [the first citizen], they shall lie with him (and) turn him into a eunuch.

=== Islamic and medieval era ===
Islam became a major religion in the region following the first Arab conquest of the region in the 7th century. However, despite the prohibit the region continued up to the present.

=== Ottoman and British rule ===
In 1858, the Ottoman Empire, which ruled the area of modern-day Iraq as part of Ottoman Iraq province, abolished its existing sodomy laws. The assumption of control over the three vilayets of the province by the British (as a League of Nations mandate known as the British Mandate of Mesopotamia) imposed a ban on homosexuality, defined in the penal code as sodomy on the province which would remain well after independence in 1932. A notable singer in Iraq from c.1925 to 1944 was the Ahwari folk musician Masoud El Amaratly, who was assigned female at birth but lived his life as mustarjil.

=== Republic of Iraq ===
The Criminal Code of 1969, enacted by the Ba'athist party, only criminalized sexual behavior in cases of adultery, incest, rape, prostitution, public acts, or cases involving fraud or someone unable to give consent due to age or mental defect. Homosexuality per se was not a crime, but could be justification for government discrimination and harassment under laws designed to protect national security and public morality.

From the enactment of this code in 1969 to 2001, Iraqi security forces had considerably leeway to harass, jail or even execute anyone deemed to be a threat to national security or public morality. LGBTQ people could be harassed, jailed or blackmailed into becoming spies for the regime.

No LGBTQ-rights organization was allowed to exist in Iraq, and laws designed to specifically discriminate against LGBTQ people began to appear in the 1980s. Sodomy was re-criminalized by a 1988 resolution, but only when it involved prostitution. [Combating Prostitution Law No. 8 of 1988].

The Iraqi Law of Personal Status was amended in the 1980s to specifically permit a wife to divorce her husband in cases where the husband was guilty of a homosexual relationship. The practice of "honor killing" was also made legal in the family law code, which meant that LGBTQ people could be killed by a family member for bringing "shame" or "dishonor" to the family.

When the AIDS-HIV pandemic reached Iraq in 1986, Saddam Hussein believed that the disease could be spread by casual contact, and thus ordered all Iraqis with the disease to be relocated to a special prison facility. Widespread ignorance about the disease meant that all Iraqis with hemophilia, along with homosexuals, were often suspected of carrying the disease.

After the war with Iran, Saddam Hussein felt the need to increase his support among Iraqis with more traditionalist Islamic social values through a movement known as the Faith Campaign, a large campaign to reshape Saddam Hussein's image from that of a secularist to that of a champion of traditional Islamic morality. One of the ways that the government achieved this was through strong, and public, opposition to LGBTQ people.

As part of this, in the early 1990s, at the United Nations, the Iraqi delegation cited religion at the time as their reasoning for opposing efforts to have the international body support for LGBT rights.

In the summer of 1993 compulsory religious education was introduced into Iraqi schools. Nightclubs accused of harboring prostitutes were closed and the constitution was amended to include the death penalty for homosexuality.

In 1995, Saddam Hussein created a new military unit called Fedayeen Saddam ("Saddam's Men of Sacrifice") to punish Iraqis whose behavior or life-style was deemed to be in violation traditional Islamic mores. This group operated similar to an armed Mutaween (religious police), and often staged public torture and executions of LGBTQ people as women who had sex outside of marriage. Approximately 3,000 people were tortured from 1991 to 2003 by Saddam Hussein's security forces for expressing their sexuality.

In 1999, an urban legend began to circulate that the Iraqi government banned the South Park television series, and feature film, because it depicted Saddam Hussein being involved in a homosexual relationship with Satan. While the film would not have been approved by the Iraqi censorship board, Western filmmakers did not attempt to exhibit films in Iraq because of the economic sanctions.

In 2001, the IRCC Resolution 234 of 2001 was enacted. This established the death penalty for adultery, being involved with prostitution, and anyone who, "Commits the crime of sodomy with a male or female or who violates the honor of a male or female without his or her consent and under the threat of arm or by force in a way that the life of the victim (male or female) is threatened."

With the intention of discrediting Saddam Hussein with his supporters, the CIA considered making a video in which he would be seen having sex with a teenage boy.

=== American occupation of Iraq ===
When Coalition Provisional Authority Chief executive Paul Bremer took control of Iraq following the U.S. invasion in 2003, he issued a series of decrees that restored the Iraqi criminal code back to the Iraq penal code of 1969 (as revised in 1988), abolishing the death penalty (which the newly formed Iraqi government restored in 2005), and removing most restrictions on free speech and assembly.

Despite this, starting in 2003, large waves of harassment and violence against LGBTQ people from family members and other Iraqis who felt the need to punish people for violating traditional Islamic laws could be seen. Many people outside of the LGBTQ community, ranging from journalists, citizens, and even some politicians in Iraq, reported how brutal many of the attacks were. It is around this time that many LGBTQ activist organizations, such as The Organization of Women's Freedom in Iraq and Iraqi LGBTQ, started to form in response to the growing violence. The largest amounts of murder and death would happen during this time period, and despite the formation of many LGBTQ activist organization, many would be forced to disband, go underground, or travel to different countries to continue work there.

Anti-LGBT laws restricting freedom of expression and association

On February 5, 2005, IRIN News agency (now The New Humanitarian) issued a report titled "Iraq: Male homosexuality still a taboo". The article stated, among other things, that "honor killings" by Iraqis against a gay family member are common and given some legal protection. The article also stated that the 2001 amendment to the criminal code stipulating the death penalty for homosexuality "has not been changed", even though Paul Bremer clearly ordered the criminal code to go back to its 1980s edition.

Since 2005, there have been reports that the Supreme Council for the Islamic Revolution in Iraq's Badr Organization has been involved in death squad campaigns against LGBTQ Iraqi citizens, and that they are supported in these policies by the Grand Ayatollah Ali al-Sistani. New barbaric attacks, with 90 victims, are reported in the first months of 2012.

These reports seem to stem from a fatwa issued by Iraqi cleric Grand Ayatollah Ali al-Sistani stating that homosexuality and lesbianism are both "forbidden" and that they should be "Punished, in fact, killed. The people involved should be killed in the worst, most severe way of killing".

Early drafts in English of the 2005 Iraqi constitution contained a provision that asserted that none of the rights or liberties protected in the Constitution would apply to "deviants". Later revisions of the Iraqi Constitution removed the deviants clause. Several clauses throughout the revised document assert that Islam will be the foundation of the law and that various civil liberties shall be limited by "public morality".

The Iraqi civil war's end in 2008, saw a decrease in violence for people's daily lives, and this allowed a surge in nightlife, including gay nightlife, in Baghdad, Basra, Najaf, and other cities for people in the LGBTQ community. This, however, also allowed the Sadrist militiamen of the Mahdi Army to reposition themselves to killing LGBTQ people.

According to a New York Times story in April 2009, Shiʿa clerics in Baghdad "devoted a portion of Friday Prayer services to inveighing against homosexuality." This emboldened many a people, and saw that the increase of LGBTQ activity, slowed down significantly.

==== Police officers ====
In addition to the national penal code, members of the Iraqi Internal Security forces, along with current students and retirees, are bound the rules outlined in Decree Number 9 (2008). The degree bans police officers from associating with people of ill repute, and punishes police officers who engage in homosexual sodomy with up to fifteen years imprisonment.

==== Military ====
The Military Penal Law No. 19 of 2007 prohibits its men from engaging in homosexual acts.

==== Personal status law ====
These are laws used in special courts designed to handle certain disputes among Iraqi Muslims, especially as it applies to marriage, divorce, alimony, and inheritance.

The Iraqi Personal Status Law (1959) has to relevant provisions;

Article 3 – Marriage is defined as a union between a man and a woman to create children.

Article 40 Section 2 – A legal separation may be granted if either spouse is unfaithful, with the act of homosexuality included as an example of being unfaithful. This provision was added to the law in 1981.

The Iraqi Kurdistan Personal Status Law (1992) also has some relevant provisions;

Article 1 - Marriage is defined as a voluntary union between a man and a woman to create a family.

Article 7 - The couple seeking to marry must produce medical documents that prove that they are not infected with AIDS.

==== Post-2011 U.S. withdrawal ====
Legally, the National Crime Code of Iraq prohibits public behavior that is "indecent", giving significant leeway to police officers to enforce traditional Islamic mores and attitudes about gender. While the National Constitution promises to respect the right to privacy as well as various other civil liberties, the Constitution stipulates that Islam is the official government religion and it also allows for considerable regulation of personal liberty in the name of protecting public morals. Yet, oftentimes the violent attacks on LGBTQ Iraqis are extrajudicial in nature.

It has been suggested that physical and sexual violence against homosexuals has increased since the U.S. withdrawal from Iraq, with militias and the police in particular, despite the legal nature of homosexuality, now engaging more in anti-homosexual violence. This problem is made more complicated by the fact that members of the police are often also members of various militia groups.

The Iraqi Ministry of Human Rights has responded to allegations of increasing homophobic violence by stating that its responses are limited by the fact that LGBTQ people are not a listed minority in Iraq, but has also emphasized that a number of cases of discrimination and violence against the LGBTQ community has been passed onto the interior ministry. Ali al-Dabbagh, Prime Minister Maliki's spokesperson has denied organized persecution against the LGBTQ community but has suggested that members of the community keep their homosexuality private in order to avoid persecution.

Early 2012 saw a large wave of killings of "emo" teenagers accused of homosexuality on the basis of their clothing, and would later be called the "Emo Killings". These killings were done by Shi'a death squads of the Mahdi Army, and were largely condemned by human rights groups outside of Iraq. Many Shi'a clerics, as well as the chairperson of the human rights committee of the Iraqi parliament, denounced these killings, but were also against emo culture as a whole.

In 2023, Raad al-Maliki sought penalties of life imprisonment and death for gay people. The bill, which amends a 1988 anti-prostitution law, eventually passed, though with lesser penalties. On April 27, 2024, Iraq's parliament voted to establish crimes and implement punishments that include:

- Same-sex relationships, up to 15 years in prison
- "Promoting homosexuality", up to seven years in prison
- "Biological sex changes based on personal desires and inclination", up to three years in prison for both the transgender person and the doctor (excludes court-ordered medical procedures to "treat" intersex people's "birth defects" to "affirm" their sex)

==== Iraqi Kurdistan ====
In 2010, efforts by the Kurdish government to promote gender equality, were attacked by Kamil Haji Ali, Minister of Endowments and Religious Affairs, as well as the Kurdistan Islamic Movement for trying to legalize same-sex marriage. The KRG and other supporters of gender equality, stated the legislation does not deal with LGBTQ rights issues, but deals with social justice issues impacting women.

=== ISIL terrorism ===
In the areas controlled by the Islamic State of Iraq and the Levant, first offenders of homosexuality are sentenced to death, torture, floggings, beatings, and other violence.

== Statements from political parties ==
Due to the intense social stigma surrounding LGBTQ people in Iraq, political parties there are reluctant to publicly express support for LGBTQ rights, for fear of alienating large sectors of voters. Islamist parties are openly, even violently, hostile, while the more secular parties prefer to avoid the issue. For example, while the Global Green Movement backs LGBTQ rights, the Green Party of Iraq did not do so publicly. The Worker-communist Party of Iraq and Left Worker-communist Party of Iraq are rare exceptions. No openly LGBTQ Iraqis have run for elected office in Iraq.

On May 17, 2020, the EU, British, and Canadian embassies raised the pride flag at their Baghdad headquarters, which led to significant backlash and criticism. The EU embassy was forced to take down the flag after a few hours. This incident sparked a hate campaign against the LGBT community in Iraq, which was supported by some prominent Iraqi politicians.

In response, Zhiar Ali, an LGBT rights activist, authored an extensive report on the situation of LGBT individuals in Iraq, which was published on the website of Rasan, an organisation he was involved in. The report documented instances of violence and murder targeting people perceived to be gay, as well as instances of hate speech against the LGBT community broadcast on national television. The report was cited in a December 2020 baseline assessment by the international organization Madre.

== LGBT activism in Iraq ==
=== Rasan ===
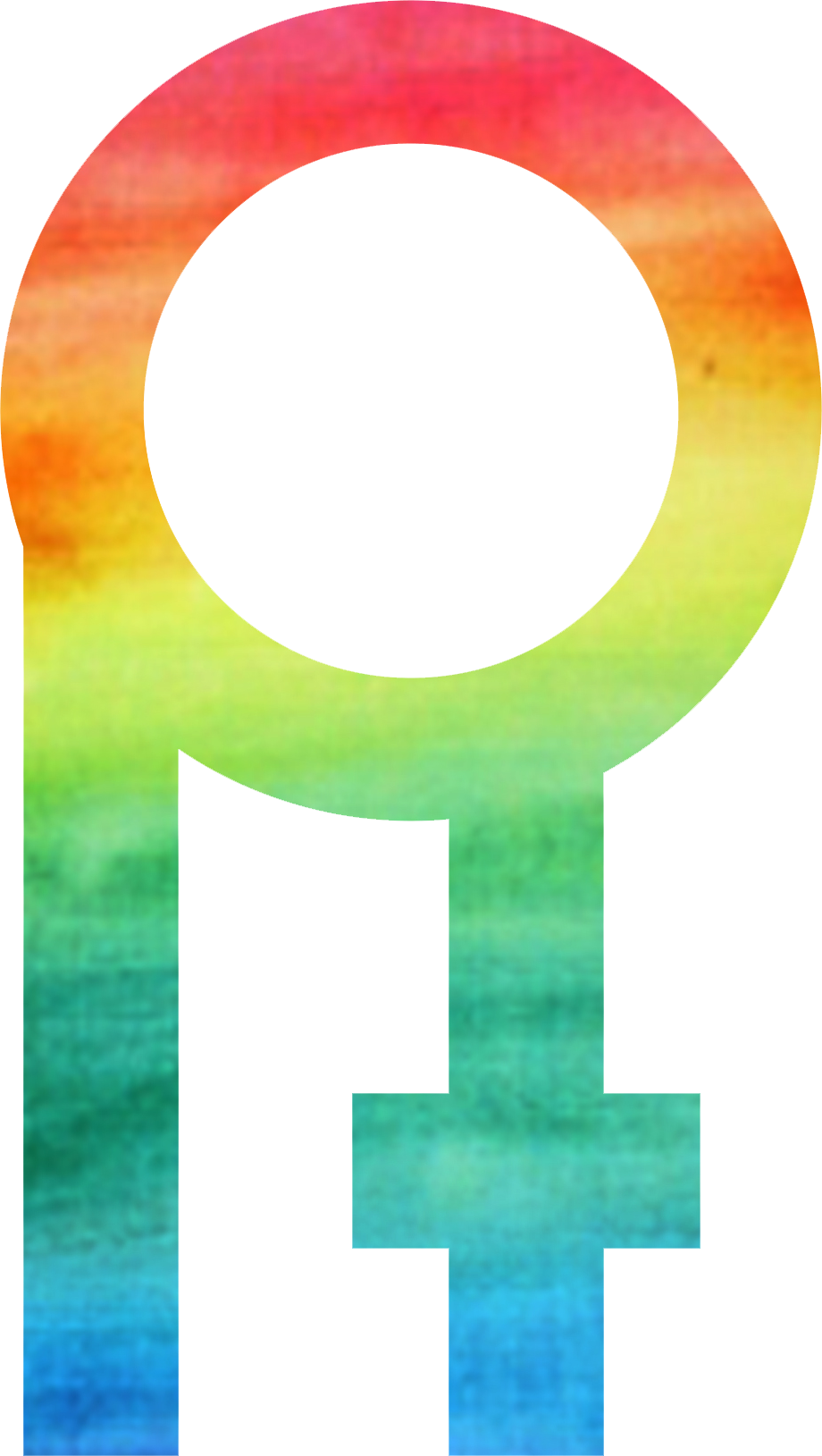
Logo of Rasan, shaped like the letter R, represents women (with the female gender symbol present) as well as the LGBTQ community (with the rainbow colors.)

The first pro LGBTQ organization to formally and legally operate in Iraq is Rasan. The organization is operating in Sulaymaniyah, located in Iraqi Kurdistan. The organization was initially a feminist women's rights organization when it was established in 2004, but then started working for LGBTQ people in 2012 and implemented larger projects in 2016 as partners of COC Nederland in a project called "Pride Program" (called Crossing Iraqi Rainbow locally in Iraq).

The work began by a campaign which consisted of painting murals around the city of Sulaymaniyah, where the organization's base is located. Amongst the works done, a lot of the murals represented the LGBTQ community and had rainbows and other symbols that were associated with the community. Some of the murals consisted of same-sex couples with "love is love" messages written under them. Although there are other organizations that are working for the LGBTQ community, Rasan is the only local organization publicly supporting the community in Iraq as a whole, with a focus on the Kurdish population.

=== The Organization of Women's Freedom in Iraq (OWFI) ===
The OWFI started in 2003 and has a focus on ensuring pioneering work to rebuild Iraq with secular democracy and human rights for all. Following the battles for Mosul and other nearby cities against ISIS, over 3 million people have found themselves displaced, with 10 million needing humanitarian aid, OWFI spearheaded an organized effort to change Iraq's Anti-Shelter Policy, which only allowed government run shelters to exist. OWFI led over 40 different local organization to change these policies, and expand the basic civil liberties of people in the region.

=== Iraqueer ===
Iraqueer formed in March 2015 with LGBTQ members all over Iraq as the second organization supporting LGBTQ followed by Rasan, with the express goal of raising the awareness level among and about LGBTQ identities in the Iraqi society, and to advocate for LGBTQ rights in Iraq. Iraqueer has three main methods of achieving its goal, by providing education, advocacy, and direct services. In terms of education, Iraqueer has published several guides ranging from security to health safety along with the novel Living in The Margins, containing LGBTQ stories from people living in Iraq. They also upload videos to YouTube that talk about the different aspects of being an LGBTQ individual in Iraq. Finally, they host several workshops dedicated to teaching people about gender and sexuality, how to lobby and properly advocate, and to maintain safety and security in times of crisis. Iraqueer has submitted several reports to international bodies, including the United Nations, talking about the state of LGBTQ people in Iraq.

=== Iraqi LGBT ===
Iraqi LGBT is an LGBTQ rights organization, establish in September 2005, that was created in response to the rise in violence against LGBTQ people. Their main goal is the creation and maintenance of several different "safe houses" in Iraq, where people who are fleeing from prosecution can find protection and safety. Though they have done activist work promoting tolerance in Iraq, Iraqi LGBTQ focuses on relocating LGBTQ people to safer countries, and providing legal help for the LGBTQ people seeking asylum.

=== International Railroad for Queer Refugees ===
Founded in 2008, International Railroad for Queer Refugees (IRQR) provides financial and resettlement assistance for LGBTQ asylum seekers who are fleeing their homes because of prosecution for their sexual orientation, or gender identity. They also provide assistance and workshops for local organizations, so they can be better prepared in dealing with legal and social ramifications, as well as maintaining a network with different organizations so information can be spread easily, and not be intercepted by government officials.

The International Gay and Lesbian Human Rights Commission (IGLHRC) are a group of individuals who actively promote the rights of LGBTQ individuals in Iraq. The Islamic state prescribes death for the "practice" of homosexuality. Furthermore, evidence gathered for two briefings by IGLHRC, its partners, and MADRE demonstrate the direct effect of the collapse of the rule of law on LGBTQ persons, through unfettered violence by sectarian militias.

=== Yeksani ===
Yeksani is an initiative focused on advocating for LGBTQ rights in the Kurdistan Region of Iraq. Founded by Zhiar Ali, a Kurdish LGBTQ rights activist and former media and communications officer at Rasan, the organization works to raise awareness of LGBTQ issues and advocate for legal protections and equality for the community. The organization has been active in the region since 2021, and has carried out various campaigns and initiatives to promote LGBTQ rights. According to their website, "Yeksani was created to combat the lengthy hate campaigns the LGBT+ community has been facing in Iraq, partly due to improper media representation."

== National backlash ==
Starting in 2003 with the rise of religious conservatism in the Iraq government, many media outlets began to publish articles and think pieces that condemned queer and LGBTQ people as practices of Satanism that contradict Islamic precepts and human nature. Major killings that targeted LGBTQ people began during this time, though the killings done in 2004 would not be discovered until later on due to the large amount of violence already occurring in the region. The people responsible for the killings would be linked to the Iran-backed Badr Corps, which form part of the Islamic Supreme Council of Iraq (ISCI).

In 2005, on Grand Ayatollah Ali al-Sistani's website, a fatwa, or a ruling on a point of Islamic law, was issued that declared the killing of homosexual men justified. It would be later taken down due to protests by advocate groups. Many international viewers saw this as one main causes in the rise of anti-LGBTQ violence, the Human Rights Watch saw little correlation between the fatwa and the violence.

The Mahdi Army formed again in 2009, and using the LGBTQ community as proof that the militia is needed to cleanse Iraq of undesirable people. The method used most often to succeed in their goals was to kill LGBTQ people. This would go on to be known as the killing campaigns. The militia justified their actions by citing that the killings were done for a moral cause that was meant to protect masculinity and traditional values. During the height of these killings, magazines and newspapers like Al-Esbuyia and Al-Sabah would publish pieces that supported the killings, and called for more action to stop the "feminization of men".

In 2023, Noor Alsaffar was murdered in Baghdad. Alsaffar, age 23, identified as a male "cross-dresser" and said: "I'm not transgender and I'm not gay." Alsaffar worked as a model and makeup artist known on TikTok as "Noor BM".

== International law ==
In 1971, Iraq ratified the International Covenant on Civil and Political Rights (ICCPR) treaty, which placed a mandate on Iraqi officials to act against actions done to antagonize or oppress protected and minority groups, among these civil and political rights include; The Right to Life and Security, Protection Against Torture and Inhuman and Degrading Treatment, and The Guarantee of Non-Discrimination. Iraq has continuously violated these rights, and although the UN Human Rights Committee has condemned Iraq for violating the treaty, it has not faced any major consequences because of it.

== International concerns ==
In June 2009, the U.S. State Department raised concerns regarding equality and human rights in a statement from spokesperson Ian Kelly. They condemned human rights violations in Iraq based on sexual orientation and gender. They also announced that their training for Iraqi security forces included instruction on human rights, and that they were continuing to urge Iraqi officials to respond to credible reports of violence against gay and lesbian Iraqis.

The U.S. Department of State's 2012 human rights report found that "Due to social conventions and retribution against both victim and perpetrator of non-consensual same-sex sexual conduct and violence against participants in consensual same-sex sexual conduct, this activity was generally unreported." Authorities tried to prosecute same-sex sexual activity on the grounds of public indecency or prostitution. LGBT people faced violence from nongovernmental actors, such as a wave of attacks in Baghdad, Basrah, Samarra, Wasit, and Tikrit from February to April, which targeted those thought to be LGBT. Flyers appeared in Baghdad which called out people by name and threatened them "unless they cut their hair, stopped wearing nonconformist clothing, and gave up their 'alternative' lifestyles." The attacks themselves included intimidation, verbal harassment, kidnappings, beatings, sexual assault, and killings. Extremist groups such as the Mahdi Army and League of the Righteous (Asa'ib Ahl al-Haq) were accused of perpetuating some of the attacks. Reports varied on the number of victims killed; UNAMI independently verified the deaths of at least 12 individuals; a Reuters report put the number of victims in Baghdad at 14; and local human rights NGOs reported much higher numbers.

The government did not acknowledge attacks, did not ensure safety for those publicly named, and did not announce arrests or prosecutions for such attacks. LGBT organizations could not operate openly, and events such as gay pride marches or gay rights advocacy could not be held. Sexual orientation or gender identity were not protected by discrimination law, and "discrimination in employment, occupation, and housing based on sexual orientation, gender identity, and unconventional appearance was common." Information on education or health care discrimination was not available, but media reported harassment at school for not adopting conventional clothing or hairstyles.

== Summary table ==
Same-sex sexual activity legal	(implicitly) illegal (explicitly) Penalty: 15 years in prison, fines, and deportation
Equal age of consent	No
Freedom of expression	No (Up to 4 years in prison)
Anti-discrimination laws in employment only	No
Anti-discrimination laws in the provision of goods and services	No
Anti-discrimination laws in all other areas	No
Same-sex marriages	No
Recognition of same-sex couples	No
Stepchild adoption by same-sex couples	No
Joint adoption by same-sex couples	No
Gays, lesbians and bisexuals allowed to serve openly in the military	No
Right to change legal gender	No
Access to IVF for lesbians	No
Commercial surrogacy for gay male couples	No
Conversion therapy banned	No
MSMs allowed to donate blood	No

== See also ==
- Human rights in post-invasion Iraq
- LGBT rights in Asia
- LGBT rights in the Middle East
- Violence against LGBT people
- Murder of Doski Azad
