= All Out (organisation) =

International not-for-profit organisation

- Formation: 2010
- Founders: Andre Banks; Jeremy Heimans
- Type: 501(c)(4); 501(c)(3) fund
- Legal status: Advocacy organization focused on changing policy
- Purpose: Bringing people power to the global movement for love and equality
- Headquarters: New York City / London
- Services: Political advocacy
- Chair: Alex Coccia
- Executive Director: Matt Beard
- Website: allout.org/en/

All Out is a global not-for-profit organisation that is focused on political advocacy for the human rights of lesbian, gay, bisexual, transgender, queer/questioning, intersex, asexual/aromantic and all others in LGBTQIA+ communities. It was first established in 2010 as a program of Purpose Foundation, later becoming its own legal entity, Purpose Action, and finally All Out Action Fund, Inc. in 2014.

All Out's goal is to bring the power of people beyond geographical barriers to express their solidarity and be a positive force on the side of LGBTQIA+ people.

All Out has staff members in Brazil, Colombia, Germany, Italy, Mexico, Kenya, Portugal, Spain, and the USA.

== Campaigns ==
In February 2014, All Out held demonstrations against the Olympic sponsors in nineteen cities to urge the sponsors to speak more forcefully against the then-recently passed Russian anti-LGBTQ law, including many protests against Coca-Cola, demanding that “[a]t the very least, they should speak out, consistently with their own values” (referring to "good record on gay rights" in the United States).

#GayIsOk was a campaign started by Lush cosmetics, backed up by All Out. The campaign raised £275,000 for the LGBT community.

When the Google Translate tool translated the word 'gay' to offensive terms, the former Executive Director of All Out, Andre Banks, launched a petition calling for Google to make the necessary changes, gathering over 52,000 signatures for the campaign.

In 2012, All Out took down a petition aimed at shooting back against anti-gay boycott groups placing pressure on EA due to gay characters included in the game publisher's titles. The page was hit by spam attacks that came from different IP addresses. This was later sorted by removing the spam comments and updating the signature count on the All Out’s campaign page.

Following the rise of anti-gay rhetoric and violence coupled with the declaration of LGBT-free zones in Poland, Polish LGBT community members have stated that they feel unsafe. All Out launched a campaign to counter the attacks, with some 10,000 people signing a petition shortly after the campaign launch.

== See also ==
- List of LGBT-related organizations and conferences
