= Murder of Doski Azad =

Trans woman and makeup artist

- Doski Azad, the victim of a transphobic honor killing in Duhok, Iraq
- Native name: دۆسکی ئازاد
- Location: 36.0°N 42.9°E; Mangesh, Duhok, Iraqi Kurdistan
- Date: 28 January 2022
- Target: Doski Azad, transgender woman
- Attack type: Shooting, honour killing
- Motive: Transphobia
- Inquiry: Ongoing investigation by Kurdish authorities and Interpol
- Accused: Chakdar Azad
- Charges: Murder
- This case sparked outrage and calls for justice from LGBTQ+ activists and international organizations like Human Rights Watch.

Doski Azad was a 23-year-old transgender woman living in Duhok, Iraqi Kurdistan. She was a make-up artist and internet personality who was open about her transition on social media. On 28 January 2022, she was shot and killed by her estranged brother, Chakdar Azad, in what has been described as a transphobic honour killing; her murder was discovered three days later, on 31 January 2022.

It is reported that Doski had left her family five years prior to the incident, but her family continued to pursue and intimidate her. The incident received wide coverage in international media and was met with condemnation by various organisations, including human rights groups, LGBT organisations, and foreign diplomatic missions. While the Kurdish authorities said that they issued an arrest warrant and worked with Interpol to find the perpetrator, her murderer has still not been found to date.

The murder of Doski Azad has brought attention to the issue of transphobic violence and discrimination faced by transgender individuals in Iraq and Kurdistan, as well as the need for better protection and support for transgender individuals who may be at risk of honour killings. Various advocacy groups have called for urgent action to address transphobic violence and discrimination and to provide support and resources for transgender individuals.

== Background ==
Doski had been hiding from her family since 2018 due to the danger she faced as a transgender woman. She parted ways from her family and was working as a make-up artist in a salon in Erbil. By 18 December 2021, Doski's brother Chakdar, who had lived in Europe since 2016, returned to Duhok with plans to kill his sister. Despite her efforts to keep her location secret, her brother was able to track her down after a one-month search in Babukhki village, shooting Doski twice in the head and chest.

According to IraQueer, Chakdar believed Doski had "degraded the males in her family", by openly identifying as an LGBT person, which is considered disgraceful and dishonourable in conservative Muslim families.

According to a report by The Guardian and Insider, Doski's hands had been tied, she had been shot twice, and her body was found dumped in a ditch just outside of the city of Duhok. Local media reported that her social media accounts were also deleted. Doski's body was only found after a relative had reported it to the police. Chakdar later escaped Kurdistan through Turkey.

According to sources, Doski had been receiving death threats from her family for some time and had been living in fear for her life. She had previously contacted IraQueer, an Iraqi LGBT organisation, to report harassment. Her friends say that she had spoken to them about previous intimidations by her family.

== Reactions ==
Statement by US Consulate

"The United States notes with concern media reports that Doski Azad, a resident of Duhok, was the victim of so-called 'honor' killing. We categorically condemn this violence and the discrimination that is undoubtedly the root of this crime. We ask the authorities to thoroughly investigate this murder and prosecute the perpetrator to the fullest extent of the law."

— Business Insider

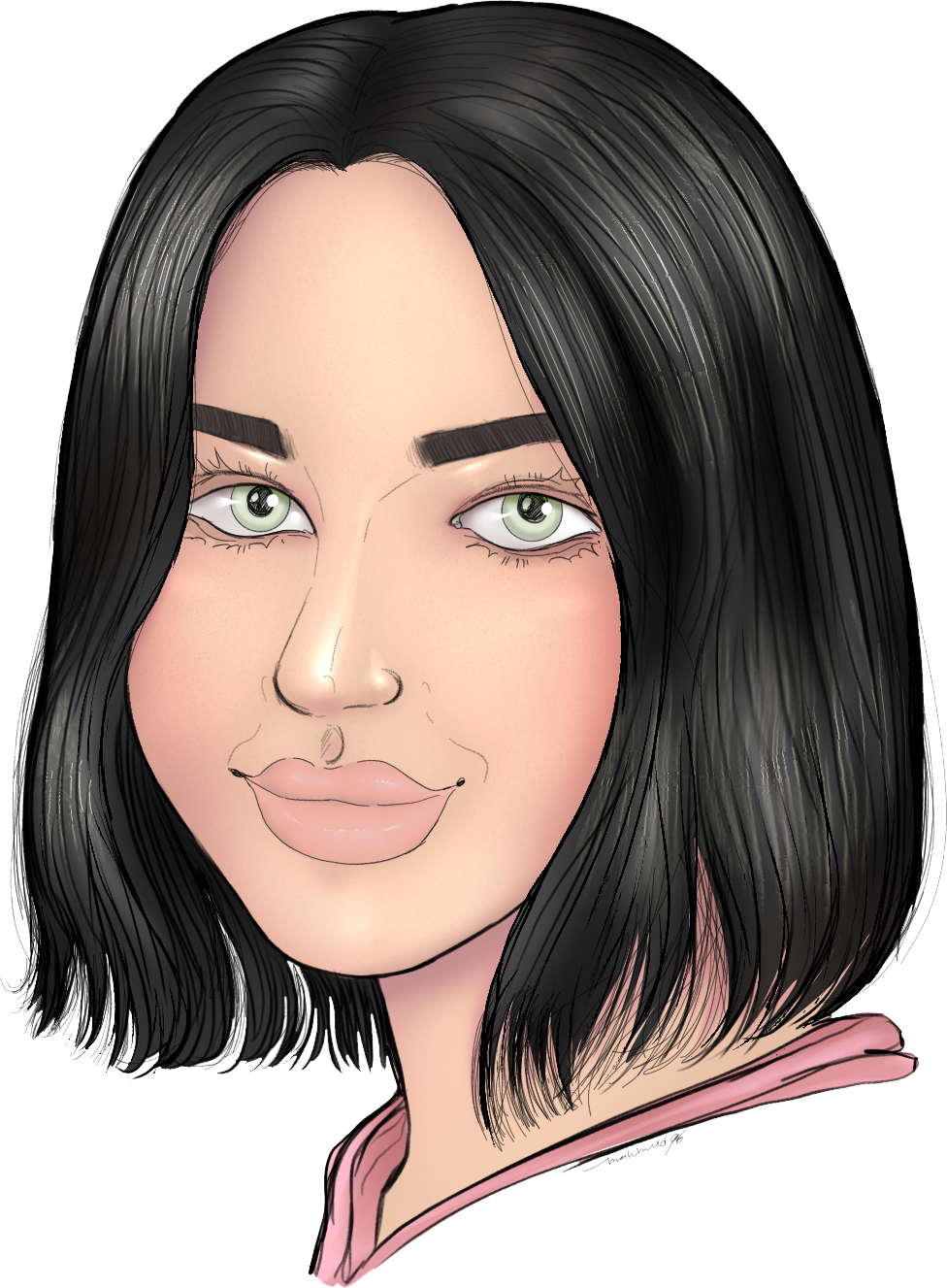
Drawing of Doski by Kurdish artist Colby

Doski's murder has sparked outrage and condemnation from human rights organisations and leaders around the world. The Kurdistan Regional Government (KRG) issued arrest warrants for Doski's brother. Officials reported to the media that they believe he may have escaped to Turkey, Belgium, or Germany, and that they were cooperating with Interpol to find him. They also reported that his name had been given to the airport police; however, up until today, Chakdar Azad has not been found.

In a statement, the KRG said that "phenomena that are contrary to social laws and traditions" had to be dealt with "within the legal system" and claimed that "Kurdistan remains a safe haven for the practice of individual freedoms." Kurdish LGBT rights activist Zhiar Ali criticized this statement, saying that the comments had clearly been inserted to "satisfy the conservatives who want to murder anyone not fitting the heteronormative narrative".

The United States Consulate based in Erbil also condemned the so-called honour killing and called for justice to be served in a strongly-worded statement. Many countries and organisations have called for the investigation of the case and the punishment of the perpetrator. The German Consulate in Erbil formally addressed the situation over Twitter, "human dignity shall be inviolable." The Canadian embassy, UNAMI, and the Dutch Consulate also released statements.

Kurdish LGBT activists held a memorial for Doski in Cologne, Germany.

A petition signed by over 25,000 people around the world was hosted on AllOut's website, demanding the KRG to put an end to honour killings, and a thorough and serious investigation into past and future hate crimes against LGBT people, as well as providing transparency about Doski's case. Yeksani had sent this petition to the KRG, but had received no response from the government.

A year after Doski's death, Yeksani released a statement supported by local, regional, and international LGBT+ organizations such as IraQueer, Mawjoudin, ILGA, Helem, Article 19, and 9 other organizations, urging the KRG, Iraqi Government, and international community take action to find Chakdar Azad and take him to court.

=== Doski's Day ===
Kurdish LGBT+ activists marked 28 January as Doski's Day.
