= IraQueer =

NGO for Iraqi LGBT+ rights

- عراق کویر
- Formation: March 3, 2015; 11 years ago
- Founder: Amir Ashour
- Founded at: Sweden
- Type: Non-Governmental Organization (NGO)
- Purpose: Supporting LGBT+ rights in Iraq
- Location: Sweden
- Region served: Iraq
- Services: Education, advocacy, direct services, asylum support
- Fields: Human rights, LGBT rights
- Official language: Arabic, Kurdish, English
- Founder: Amir Ashour
- Key people: Amir Ashour
- Affiliations: OutRight Action International, MADRE, COC Nederland, Gay Times
- Funding: Donations, partnerships, Sweden
- Website: iraqueer.org

IraQueer (Arabic: عراق کویر, Kurdish: عیڕاق کویر) is an Iraqi non-governmental organization based in Sweden advocating for LGBT rights in Iraq. It was founded in 2015. The organization undertakes education, advocacy, and direct services. IraQueer offers direct services that respond to urgent needs including safe housing, and supporting asylum seekers. IraQueer also responds to United Nations reports, and holds events.

The organization has partnered with local and international organizations including OutRight Action International, MADRE, COC Nederland, and Gay Times. It has also generated backlash from inside the country and has been renounced by Iraqi government officials.

IraQueer is not registered in Iraq because LGBT organisations cannot register there, and is forced for security reasons to carry out most work anonymously. Its founder Amir Ashour lives in Sweden and was awarded a "Generation Change Award" at the 2021 MTV Europe Music Awards in Budapest.

== History ==
=== Before 2015 ===
Before founding IraQueer, Ashour had worked with Iraqi human rights organizations as well as international organizations like MADRE and OutRight Action International on documentation and advocating for the rights of LGBT+ individuals, according to a summit speech he gave. During his work as an activist, he met and interviewed Iraqi LGBT+ individuals. This later inspired the formation of IraQueer, he said.

=== Founding in 2015 ===
In 2015, IraQueer was launched online on March 3, run by volunteers. Initially, IraQueer published accounts of Iraqi LGBT+ individuals on an online journal as well as educational resources in Arabic, Kurdish and English. These included a legal guide, a sexual health guide and a security guide. A few months after the launch of their website, IraQueer also gave trainings and engaged in international advocacy.

== Projects ==
As of December 2020, IraQueer runs 3 types of projects: Education, Advocacy and Direct services.

=== Education ===
IraQueer produces written and visual resources in Arabic, Kurdish, and English to raise awareness among and about LGBT+ Iraqis. It also gives trainings and workshops to relevant stakeholders to advance the LGBT+ movement. Examples of projects falling under this umbrella include:

- A security guide for LGBT+ Iraqis to increase their physical and digital safety.
- A sexual health guide to increase health awareness amongst LGBT+ Iraqis.
- A legal guide detailing the protective and discriminatory Iraqi laws against LGBT+ citizens.
- A storybook containing LGBT+ stories from Iraq "Living on the Margins"
- A biweekly radio shows that talk about different aspects of what it means to be LGBT+ in Iraq. This project is in collaboration with another Iraqi organization.
- A series of Animated Videos that talk about the different aspects of being an LGBT+ individual in Iraq. All videos are available in Arabic and Kurdish, with English subtitles.
- Workshops for nonprofits, government officials, companies, and other groups that are interested in human rights of LGBT+ individuals. Trainings are held in Arabic, Kurdish, or English.

=== Advocacy ===
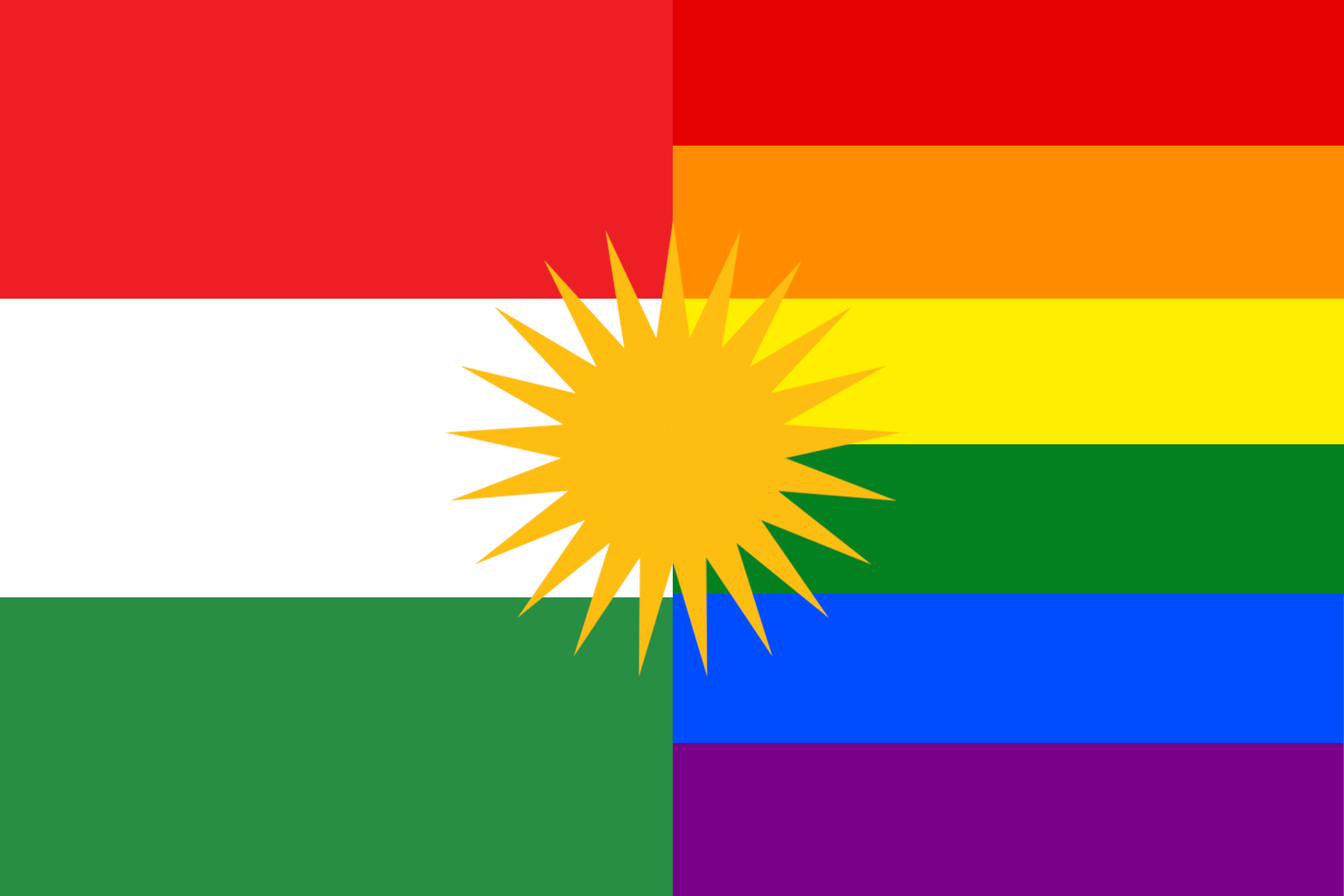
The fusion of the pride flag and the Kurdish flag results in a flag that is visually divided into two distinct sections. On the left side, the colors of the Kurdish flag display their cultural symbolism, while on the right side, the rainbow flag signifies inclusivity and diversity. Serving as a focal point, the middle part of the flag showcases the Roj emblem, a symbol of the Kurdish heritage. This flag represents the harmonious blending of LGBTQ+ pride and Kurdish identity, embodying the values of equality, unity, and cultural pride.

IraQueer leads advocacy efforts to realize human rights of LGBT+ citizens. IraQueer aims at achieving this goal through engaging directly with the United Nations and other international platforms, publishing reports and submissions, and holding events. Examples include:

- 2 shadow reports submitted to the Universal Periodic Review Committee. These reports were written with MADRE, OutRight Action International and another Iraqi organization.
- 2 shadow reports submitted to the committee Convention on the Elimination of All Forms of Discrimination Against Women. These reports were written together with MADRE, OutRight Action International and another Iraqi Organization.
- A report about Iraqi media's role in the spread of anti-LGBT+ violence called "Biased: Iraqi Media and the Spread of Anti-LGBT+ Rhetoric." Released in June 2020. It analysed Iraqi television shows about homosexuality and stated that 95% of the words used to refer to LGBT+ people were prejudiced instead of neutral. The report was supported by COC Nederland.
- A baseline study highlighting the state of LGBT+ rights in Iraq called "Fighting for the Right to Live". Released in June 2018. The report was supported by COC Nederland.

IraQueer has given speeches and has appeared on many media channels and international platforms. Including Iraqi TV Channel Al Sharqiya, Iraq's review session at the Universal Periodic Review in 2020, One Young World Summit, Huffington Post, Build series, and BBC News.

In April 2021, Ashour protested the detention and torture of LGBT people in Iraq, which was carried out by the Asayish organization.

=== Direct services ===
IraQueer offers a number of direct services, including temporary safe-housing, supporting asylum seekers with counselling, and by connecting them to support groups.

== See also ==
- Rasan (organization)
- LGBT activism in Iraq
- LGBT rights in Iraq
- Amir Ashour
- Zhiar Ali
