= BFI Production Board =

The BFI Production Board (1964-2000) was a state-funded film production fund managed by the British Film Institute (BFI) and "explicitly charged with backing work by new and uncommercial filmmakers." Emerging from the Experimental Film Fund, the BFI Production Board was a major source of funding for experimental, art house, animation, short and documentary cinema, with a continuing commitment to funding under-represented voices in filmmaking.

== 1952-63: Experimental Film Fund and early productions ==
At its foundation in the 1930s, the BFI had no mandate to fund film production in the UK. However, the 1948 Radcliffe Report 'create[d] a more favourable climate for potential film production by recommending that the Institute should focus its activities exclusively on the promotion of film as an art form'. As part of the plans for the Festival of Britain in 1951, the BFI was allocated funding to produce a cinematic side of the festival, using £10,000 to commission several short experimental films "to be shown in the Telecinema, a temporary four-hundred seater cinema on the South Bank".

After the closure of the Crown Film Unit, there was no remaining state film funding body in the UK. When a new scheme, the Eady Levy, was introduced in December 1951, providing two grants of £12,500 to make experimental films for the Telecinema, the BFI invited producer Michael Balcon to chair the selection committee, and the Experimental Film Fund was created. It received no further funding from the BFI, and offered scant support despite its ambitions. "The first projects considered were in the fields of stereoscopic technology and art documentaries." But this changed through the emergence of the Free Cinema movement, which included a number of young filmmakers - Lindsay Anderson, Karel Reisz, Tony Richardson, and Walter Lassally who were prominent contributors to the BFI's magazine Sight & Sound. The Experimental Film Fund supported Free Cinema films such as Reisz and Richardson's Momma Don't Allow, Lorenza Mazetti's Together (1956), and Lloyd Reckord's Ten Bob in Winter (1963), the first British film by a black filmmaker.

Christophe Dupin notes that, despite only having £30,000 in funding for its decade of existence, the film fund had a wide impact:

a fair proportion [of its productions] won major prizes in film festivals around the world and received positive reviews in the national press... Of the fifty or so filmmakers supported, at least 32 went on to work in a variety of jobs in the British (and occasionally overseas) film and television industries… The fact that the Fund also gave their first chance to seven women filmmakers at a time when creative jobs within the film and TV industries were the almost exclusive property of men was no small achievement either.

== 1964-71: foundation and expansion of the Production Board ==
Jennie Lee became Britain's first ever arts minister in 1964, as part of Harold Wilson's newly elected Labour government. She increased the BFI's government grant-in-aid, and "insisted that port of it should go to experimental film production and young filmmakers". Increased funding enabled the BFI to professionalise its approach to funding from 1966, under its first production officer Bruce Beresford, and grant-winning filmmakers 'were also given access to technical facilities at the BFI Production Board's offices near Waterloo'.

The Board's first production, Herostratus, had begun under the Experimental Film Fund, and its production was delayed by the transition to the Production Board, and by the inexperience of the production team. Its second featurette Loving Memory (1970) followed on from its director Tony Scott's opportunity to direct a short, One of the Missing. Beresford's successor Mamoun Hassan commissioned a featurette from London Film School graduate Bill Douglas. My Childhood (1971) won the Silver Lion at the Venice Film Festival, a success that secured the reputation and future of the Board.

== 1972-1981: feature film and experimental cinema ==
In 1972, the Board's funding was increased significantly to £75,000, and producer Michael Relph took over from Michael Balcon as board chair. Under Hassan and Relph, the Board produced two further films by Douglas, My Ain Folk (1974) and My Way Home (1978), as well as features such as Winstanley, by Kevin Brownlow and Andrew Mollo, Horace Ové's Pressure (1976) - the first black feature film produced in the UK, A Private Enterprise (1974) by Peter K. Smith (the first Asian feature film produced in Britain), but it also provided funding for the London Film-Makers' Co-op, and experimental filmmakers such as Stephen Dwoskin, William Raban, Peter Gidal and Gill Etherley.

In 1974, Barrie Gavin took over from Hassan as Head of Production, but resigned fourteen months later. "Yet his short tenure remains one of the most audacious periods in the Board's history", with the production of 12 political documentaries by far-left and feminist film collectives such as the Berwick Street Collective.

After Gavin's resignation and the appointment of Peter Sainsbury as Head of Production, the Board faced a number of crises: the first concerned Sainsbury's call of a set of explicit selection criteria, which "were frequently the subject of fierce controversy among independent filmmakers"; the second concerned censorship, after the BFI caved to police demands not to screen Nick Broomfield and Joan Churchill's documentary Juvenile Liaison (1975), the first full-length documentary funded by the Board; the third concerned the lack of distribution for the Board's films, including Pressure, due to economic constraints. Sainsbury made improving this a priority, and "between 1977 and 1979, a dozen new BFI films has a London theatrical release… six of them being bought by the BBC for television transmission". Budgets remained low, and in 1979, "the Production Board [had] to strike an agreement with the ACTT (the film technicians' union) to allow crews to be paid below agreed minimum rates in exchange for a share in the profits".

Chris Petit's debut film Radio On (1979), Peter Greenaway's A Walk Through H (1978), the Brothers Quay' Nocturna Artificialia (1979), Sue Clayton's The Song of the Shirt (1979), Laura Mulvey and Peter Wollen's Riddles of the Sphinx (1979), and Menelik Shabazz's Burning an Illusion (1981) represented the diversity and innovation of Sainsbury's commissioning: they included and challenged both fiction and documentary, and combined social politics with experimental aesthetics. According to Sue Harper, the Board

backed projects which seemed too avant-garde for mainstream financiers… The aims of the BFI were laudable, and certainly films were funded which would otherwise have had no chance of reaching the screen, but the Production Board had a penchant for films with an academic flavour, which displayed their credentials with a degree of martyrdom.

In 1982, ACTT suspended their agreement with the Board, leading to the ACTT Workshop Declaration, which created a Board-funded Regional Production Fund, with monies going to the Sheffield Filmmakers' Co-op, the Leeds Animation Workshop, the Liverpool Black Media Group and the Birmingham Black Film Group.

== 1982–91: partnership with Channel 4 and the "golden age" ==
According to the BFI's Screenonline,

1982 saw a major breakthrough when Greenaway's The Draughtsman's Contract became a modest but genuine commercial success. More significantly, it was also the first co-production between the BFI and the newly established Channel 4, which gave the BFI a regular television platform and correspondingly greater exposure for its work. Behind the scenes, C4 also became a significant contributor to Production Board funds in general as well as specific individual works. Other films that benefited from the collaboration included The Gold Diggers (Sally Potter, 1983), Nineteen Nineteen (Hugh Brody, 1985) and Ascendancy (Edward Bennett, 1983), the last of which won the Golden Bear at the Berlin Film Festival.

Subsequent international successes for British art house included a Silver Bear at Berlin for Derek Jarman's Caravaggio and the International Film Critics' Prize for Terence Davies' Distant Voices, Still Lives at the Cannes Film Festival. Alan Burton and Steven Chibnall refer to this period as the Board's "golden age".

As well as providing funding for an expansive and internationally-successful British art house, the Board continued in its remit to fund first-time filmmakers and filmmakers from under-represented communities. The New Directors scheme, initiated in 1986, led to funding for a remarkable range of films, including Gurinder Chadha's I'm British But... (1989), Isaac Julien's Young Soul Rebels (1991), and Margaret Tait's Blue Black Permanent (1992).

== 1992-2000: National Lottery funding and the end of the Production Board ==
There was continuity across the change of funding that occurred in 1992 (to the Department of Heritage, and subsequently the National Lottery Fund), with filmmakers such as Patrick Keiller and Shane Meadows following earlier New Directors shorts with first features. The Board also produced features such as Sixth Happiness (Waris Hussein, 1997), Under the Skin (Carine Adler, 1997), Speak Like A Child (John Akomfrah, 1998), and Jasmin Dizdar's Beautiful People (1999), which won Best Film in Un Certain Regard at Cannes. This win was followed by an announcement at the same festival by culture minister Chris Smith, amalgamating all British film funding agencies into the UK Film Council from the following year.
