= Haditha massacre =

Killings committed by U.S. marines in 2005

- Part of the Iraq War
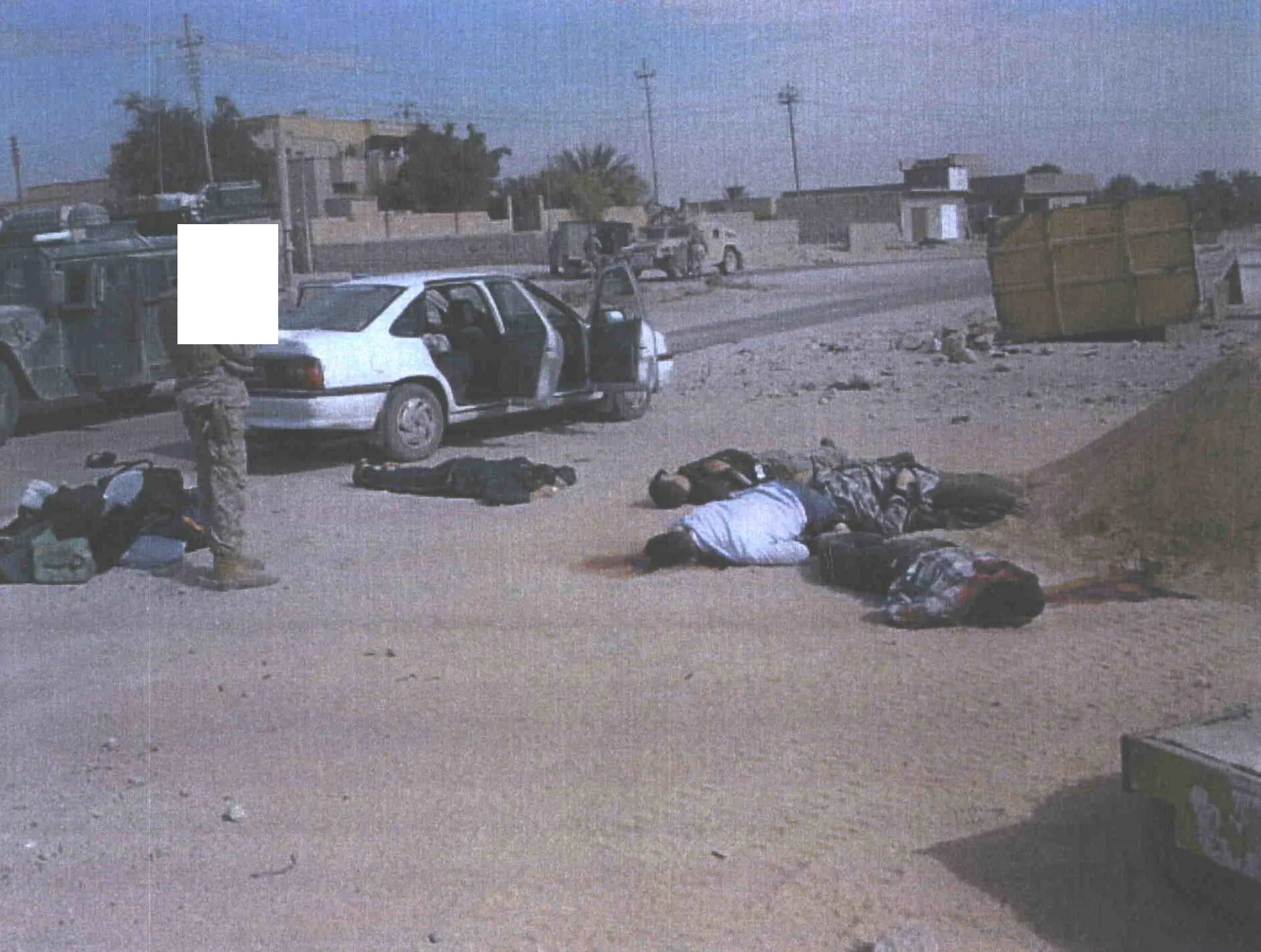
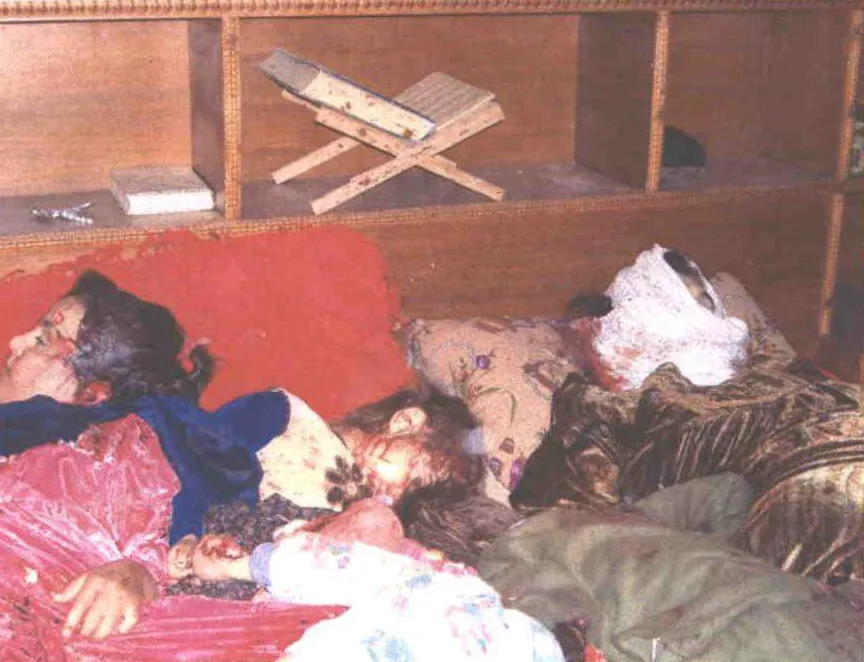
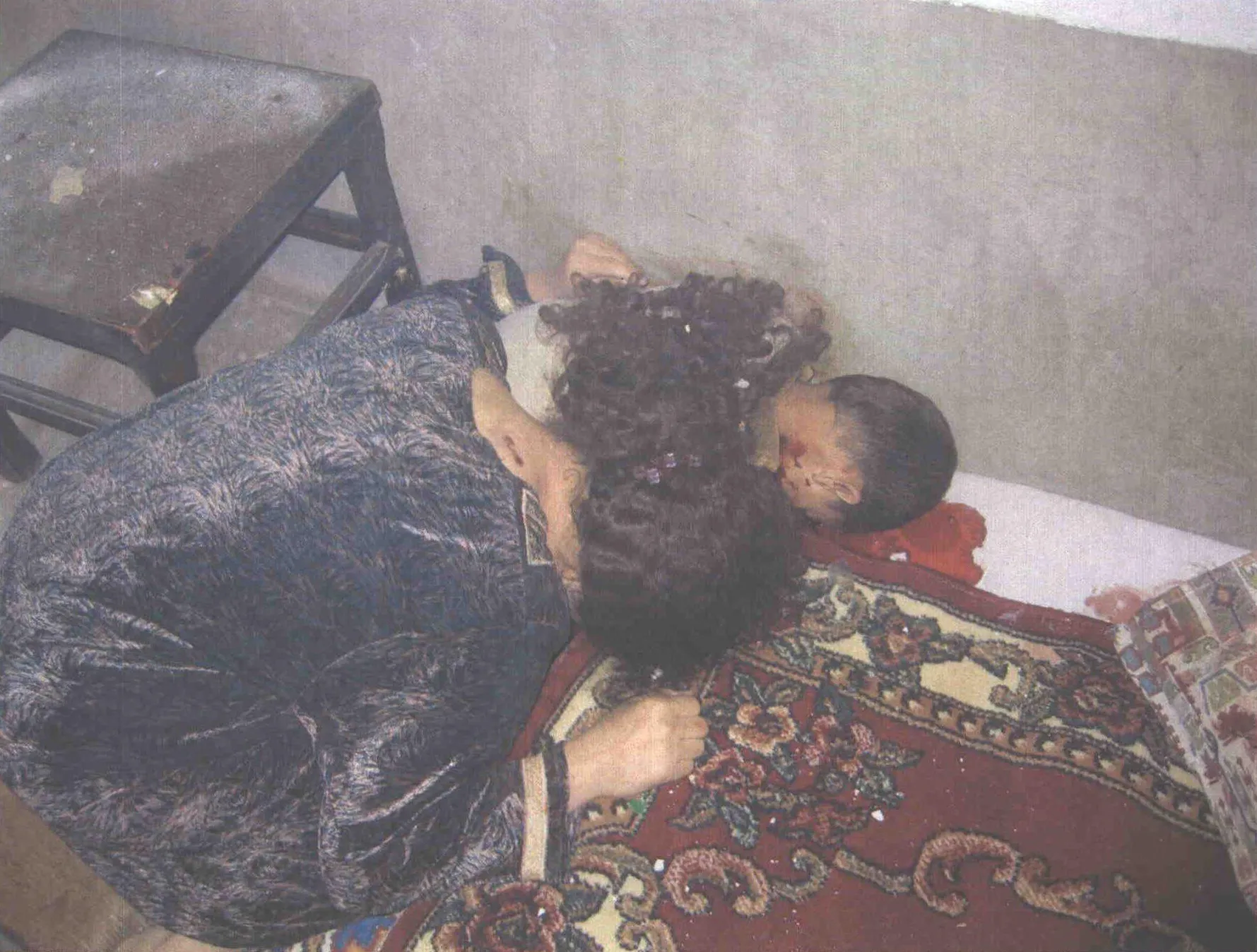
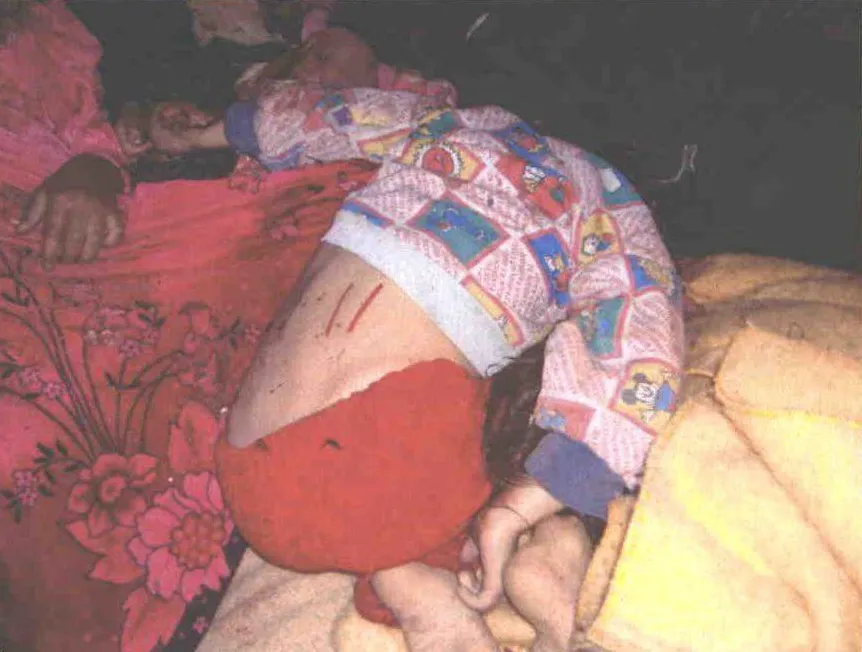
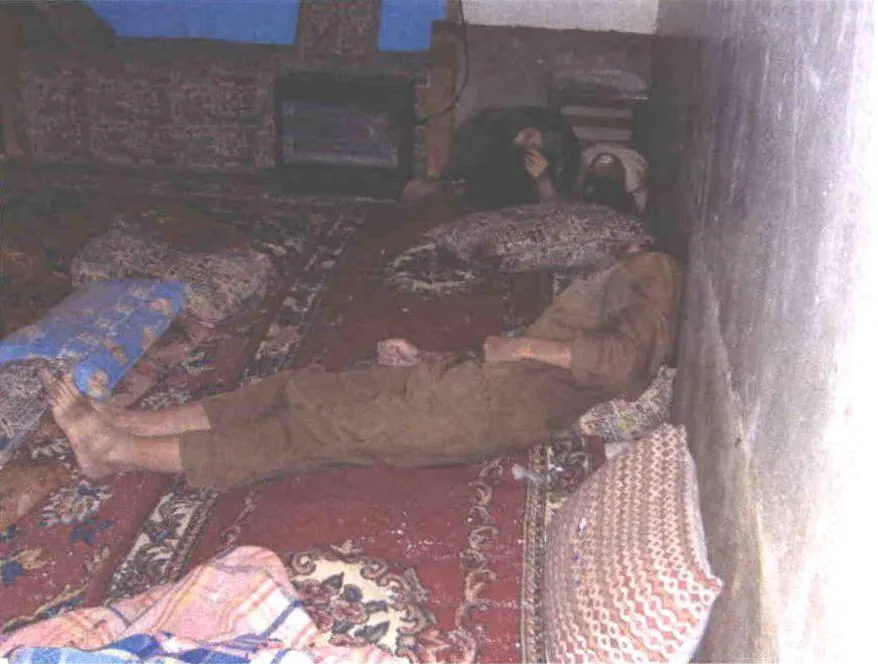
- Iraqi civilians, including children, killed by U.S. Marines during the massacre
- Location: 34°08′23″N 42°22′41″E; Haditha, Al Anbar Province, Iraq
- Date: November 19, 2005; 20 years ago
- Attack type: Raids against a vehicle and several nearby houses in response to an IED attack against U.S. Marines
- Deaths: 25 Iraqi civilians
- Perpetrators: United States Marine Corps, specifically the K Company, 3rd Battalion, 1st Marines
- Motive: Retribution for a roadside IED explosion that killed Marine Lance Corporal Miguel Terrazas

The Haditha massacre was a series of killings on November 19, 2005, in which a group of United States Marines killed 25 unarmed Iraqi civilians. It occurred in the city of Haditha in Iraq's western province of Al Anbar. Among the dead were men, women, elderly people and children as young as one year old, who were shot multiple times at close range. The massacre took place after an improvised explosive device (IED) exploded near a convoy, killing a lance corporal and severely injuring two other marines. In retaliation, the marines killed five men from a nearby taxicab and 19 others inside four nearby homes.

An initial Marine Corps communique falsely reported that 15 civilians were killed by the bomb's blast and that eight insurgents were subsequently killed by the marines. A Time magazine reporter's questions prompted the US military to open an investigation into the incident. The investigation found evidence that "supports accusations that U.S. Marines deliberately shot civilians", according to an anonymous Pentagon official. Three officers were officially reprimanded for failing to properly initially report and investigate the killings. On December 21, 2006, eight marines from 3rd Battalion, 1st Marines were charged in connection with the incident.

By June 17, 2008, six defendants had their cases dropped and a seventh was found not guilty. The only one of the eight charged to face punishment was Staff Sergeant Frank Wuterich. On October 3, 2007, the Article 32 hearing investigating officer recommended that charges of murder be dropped and Wuterich be tried for negligent homicide in the deaths of two women and five children. Further charges of assault and manslaughter were ultimately dropped. Wuterich pled guilty to the only remaining charge, one count of negligent dereliction of duty, and was convicted on January 24, 2012. Wuterich received a rank reduction and pay cut but avoided jail time. Iraqis expressed disbelief and voiced outrage after the six-year U.S. military prosecution ended with none of the marines sentenced to incarceration. A lawyer for the victims stated "this is an assault on humanity" before adding that he, as well as the government of Iraq, might bring the case to international courts.

== Background ==
In September 2005, the 3rd Battalion, 1st Marines (3/1), deployed to Haditha, an agricultural town along the Euphrates river in western Iraq. Prior to the deployment, a Guardian investigation reported that two Iraqi insurgent groups—Ansar al-Sunna and Al-Qaeda—had taken over operations of the town after driving out local police and civil servants. Although the battalion had been told to expect a battle like in Fallujah, where coalition forces had driven out Iraqi insurgents from the city, the marines faced no resistance upon entering Haditha. In Haditha, the marines established a base inside an abandoned school, which they named Forward Operating Base Sparta (FOB Sparta), and spent their time patrolling the town for insurgent activity.

While Iraqi insurgents were present in Haditha, and the town had been the site of several roadside bombings from makeshift explosives known as IEDs, insurgents rarely directly engaged with marines. Marines instead spent their time searching for insurgents, seizing munitions, and building rapport with local residents as part of the US military's "hearts and minds" campaign.

== Killings ==
=== Roadside bombing ===
On November 19, 2005, a 3/1 resupply convoy triggered an IED explosion, killing one marine and injuring two others. Lance Corporal Miguel Terrazas was killed instantly at 7:15 a.m. Terrazas was driving the Humvee when it was bisected by the explosion. Lance Corporal James Crossan was in the passenger seat and was thrown out of the vehicle and trapped under the rear passenger tire. Private First Class Salvador Guzman was in the back of the vehicle conducting security for the convoy and was thrown from the Humvee. Both Crossan and Guzman were taken to a landing zone to be evacuated for medical attention. Crossan was medically discharged from the Marines due to the wounds he received that day. Guzman returned to active duty after healing and went on a second deployment with 3/1 to Iraq in April 2007.

=== Killings and immediate aftermath ===
Killed in the massacre
Taxicab killings
- Ahmed Khidher, age 25
- Akram Hamid Flayeh, age 21
- Khalid Ayada al-Zawi, age 27
- Wajdi Ayada al-Zawi, age 22
- Mohammed Battal Mahmoud, age 21
Killed from house No. 1
- Abdul Hamid Hassan Ali, age 76
- Khamisa Tuma Ali, age 66
- Rashid Abdul Hamid, age 30
- Walid Abdul Hamid Hassan, age 35
- Jahid Abdul Hamid Hassan, age 43
- Asma Salman Rasif, age 32
- Abdullah Walid, age 4
Killed from house No. 2
- Younis Salim Khafif, age 43
- Aida Yasin Ahmed, age 41
- Muhammad Younis Salim, age 8
- Noor Younis Salim, age 14
- Sabaa Younis Salim, age 10
- Zainab Younis Salim, age 5
- Aisha Younis Salim, age 3
- Hoda Yassin, age 1
Killed from house No. 3 and 4
- Jamal Ayed Ahmed, age 41
- Marwan Ayed Ahmed, age 28
- Qahtan Ayed Ahmed, age 24
- Chasib Ayed Ahmed, age 27
Died later of injuries
- Mamdouh Ahmed Hamad, age 27

Moments after the explosion, five Iraqi men (a taxi driver and four passengers) were ordered out of their car and shot dead in the street, principally by Wuterich. After their deaths, Lieutenant William T. Kallop, according to his statements to investigators, arrived on the scene. Kallop and others reported taking small-arms fire, which they attributed to a nearby house. Kallop gave the order "to take the house". Nineteen of those killed were in three adjacent houses which Marines entered, employing grenades and small arms. According to Kallop,

The Marines cleared it the way they had been trained to clear it, which is frags first. ... It was clear just by the looks of the room that frags went in and then the house was prepped and sprayed like with a machine gun and then they went in. And by the looks of it, they just ... they went in, cleared the room, everybody was down.

On November 20, 2005, a Marine press release from Camp Blue Diamond in Ramadi reported the deaths of a Marine and 15 civilians. It said the civilians' deaths resulted from a roadside bomb and Iraqi insurgents. The initial U.S. military statement read:

A US marine and 15 civilians were killed yesterday from the blast of a roadside bomb in Haditha. Immediately following the bombing, gunmen attacked the convoy with small arms fire. Iraqi army soldiers and Marines returned fire, killing eight insurgents and wounding another.

Iman Walid, a nine-year-old child who witnessed the incident, described the Marines entering their house. She said:

I couldn't see their faces very well - only their guns sticking in to the doorway. I watched them shoot my grandfather, first in the chest and then in the head. Then they killed my granny.

About an hour after the bombing, US marines opened fire on a group of men in the street. It is unclear how many were injured, but a 27-year-old man named Mamdouh Ahmed Hamad was mortally wounded after getting shot in the head. He died an hour later after being airlifted to Al-Asad Airbase.

The director of the local hospital in Haditha, Dr. Wahid, said two American Humvees brought the 24 bodies to the hospital around midnight on November 19. While the Marines claim that the victims had been killed by shrapnel from the roadside bomb and that the men were saboteurs, Wahid said that there were "no organs slashed by shrapnel in any of the bodies". He further claimed that it appeared that "the victims were shot in the head and chest from close range."

Soon after the killings, the mayor of Haditha, Emad Jawad Hamza, led an angry delegation of elders to the Haditha Dam Marine base, reportedly complaining to the base captain.

The Marine Corps paid US$38,000 total to the families of 15 of the dead civilians.

=== Evidence about the killings ===
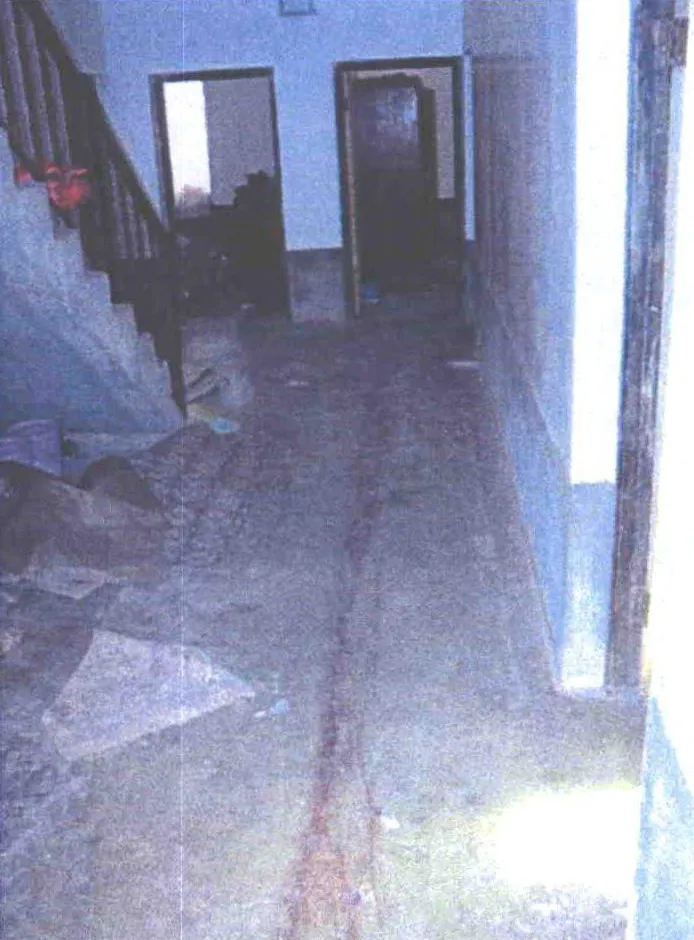
Ayda Yasin Ahmed's home where she, her sister, and five of her six children were killed by U.S. Marines. The floor has streaks of blood from Marines dragging their corpses out of the home.

Video shot by the co-founder of the Hammurabi Human Rights Organization (HHRO), Taher Thabet, which instigated Tim McGirk's original Time magazine article, and cellphone photos reportedly taken by one of the Marines the day after the killings have been put forth as evidence that the killings were methodical and without resistance. The video showed the bodies of the women and children with gunshot wounds, bullet holes in the interior walls of the house, and bloodstains on the floor. Insufficient evidence has come to light to account for insurgents hiding in the houses that first came under attack.

...the only AK-47 that was discovered that day—apparently a household defensive weapon, of the type that is legal and common in Iraq. No one has claimed that the rifle had been fired.

— William Langewiesche in "Rules of Engagement", Vanity Fair, November 2006

McGirk, who was based in Jerusalem, declined to testify at the hearings.

== Investigations ==
Upon being told of questions by reporters concerning the Haditha killings, Lieutenant General Peter W. Chiarelli instructed his public affairs office to brief them with the results of the military investigation, only to learn there had been no investigation. After video evidence which conflicted with the initial U.S. report was released, Chiarelli ordered a preliminary investigation on February 14, 2006.

Two official U.S. military investigations began. The first, under United States Army Major General Eldon Bargewell, examined how the incident was reported through the chain of command. The second, headed by the Naval Criminal Investigative Service, began on March 9, and examined the criminal aspects of the incident. The conduct of Wuterich, the squad leader, came under scrutiny.

On March 19, 2006, U.S. military officials confirmed that, contrary to the initial report, U.S. Marines, not Iraqi insurgents, killed 15 civilians.

On June 2, 2006, news outlets reported that 24 Iraqis had been killed, none as a result of the bomb explosion. This news predated the results of the U.S. military investigation, which found that the 24 unarmed Iraqis—including women and children as young as two years old—were killed by 12 members of K Company.

The Times published the result of the Bargewell investigation, including eyewitness interviews. It noted that the "official investigation has already resulted in the removal of Lieutenant Colonel Jeffrey Chessani, the commanding officer, and Captain Luke McConnell and 10-year veteran Captain James Kimber (born 1973), two company commanders, from their duties."

Bargewell's investigation found:

Statements made by the chain of command during interviews for this investigation, taken as a whole, suggest that Iraqi civilian lives are not as important as U.S. lives, their deaths are just the cost of doing business, and that the Marines need to get "the job done" no matter what it takes. These comments had the potential to desensitize the Marines to concern for the Iraqi populace and portray them all as the enemy even if they are noncombatants.

On June 1, 2006, the Associated Press reported that the Iraqi government decided to launch its own probe. Adnan al-Kazimi, an adviser to Prime Minister Nouri al-Maliki, said the decision was made during a Cabinet meeting. The probe was to be carried out by a special committee made up of the Justice and Human Rights ministries, along with security officials.

On June 17, 2006, The New York Times reported that "Investigators have also concluded that most of the victims in three houses died from well-aimed rifle shots, not shrapnel or random fire, according to military officials familiar with the initial findings." Many of those killed had wounds from close-range fire, and their death certificates record "well-aimed shots to the head and chest" as the cause of death.

The U.S. Marines avoided public statements about the killings.

In 2024 an investigation was launched by the In the Dark podcast regarding the shooting of a then unidentified man during the massacre. A breakthrough in the investigation came when they were awarded photos after a lawsuit against the military. Some of the photos showed an unidentified man who had been shot in the head, who did not match any of the known victims in the massacre. Two of the photos showed the man's tattoos, the most notable of which being a circle with a marking in the middle on his left hand. They later discovered records which confirmed the man died of his injuries and identified him as Manda Amid Hamed. The man's name did not match any of the known victims, but did closely resemble the name of one Mamdouh Ahmed Hamad who was declared missing shortly after the massacre. The In the Dark podcast was able to contact Hamad's family in 2024 and showed them the photos of the unidentified man, and they correctly identified Manda Amid Hamed as being Mamdouh Ahmed Hamad, who was 27-years-old at the time of his death. One of the marines that opened fire on Hamad was identified as Francis Wolf.

== Legal proceedings ==
The intentional killing of noncombatants is prohibited by modern laws of war derived from the United Nations Charter, the Hague Conventions and the Geneva Conventions, and constitutes a war crime. The Marines and officers were subject to courts martial under American military law, the Uniform Code of Military Justice.

Attorney Gary Myers worked on the case. He also had worked on the trial resulting from the My Lai massacre in 1968.

=== James Mattis's actions ===
In his memoir Call Sign Chaos, then I Marine Expeditionary Force commander James N. Mattis explains his experience and actions in relation to the Haditha massacre. He states he read "more than nine thousand pages" of investigative material. He concluded that "several have made tragic mistakes, but others had lost their discipline", which is why he recommended courts-martial for some Marines but not for others. The battalion commander was not aware of the details on the same day of the incident, and the killings were brought to light by a reporter. Mattis relieved the battalion commander from duty because the lack of reporting and because the number of civilian deaths "should have alerted him that something very out of the ordinary ... had occurred." He then recommended letters of reprimand for the division commander and two colonels, stating, "[b]y their actions or inactions, they demonstrated lack of due diligence." This action forced the senior officers to leave active service.

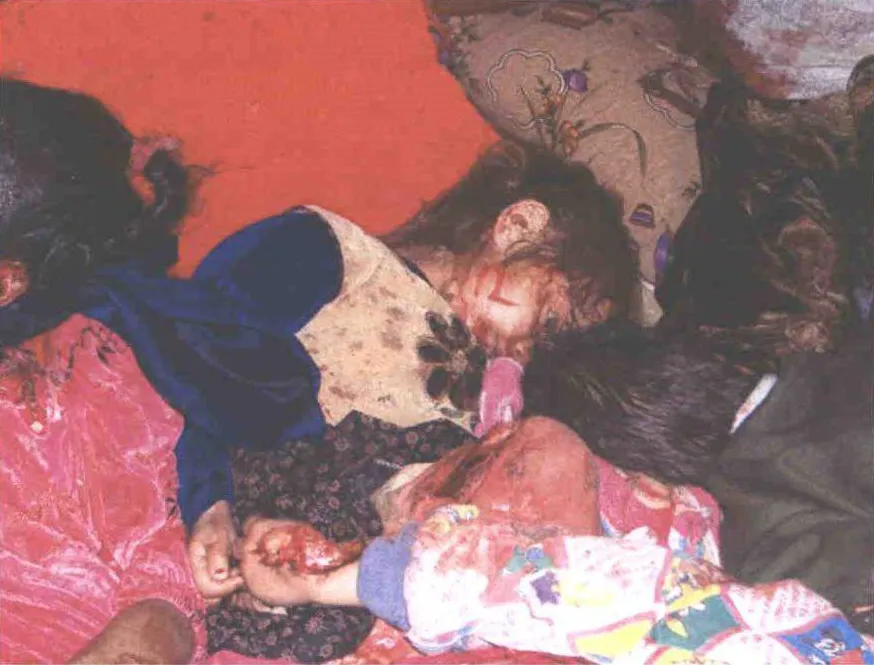
Three-year-old Ayesha Younis Salim after she was shot dead by U.S. Marines. Her face is marked with the number 12 in red sharpie, to distinguish between the dead bodies. To her left is her ten-year-old sister Sabaa and to her right is her eight-year-old brother Mohammed. At the bottom of the photo is the arm of her five-year-old sister Zainab.

=== Charges leveled ===
On December 21, 2006, the U.S. military charged eight Marines in connection with the Haditha incident. Four of the eight (Wuterich, Sergeant Sanick P. Dela Cruz, Lance Corporal Justin Sharratt and Lance Corporal Stephen Tatum) were accused of unpremeditated murder. Tatum was further charged with negligent homicide and assault, while Dela Cruz was also charged with making a false statement. Wuterich was charged with 12 counts of unpremeditated murder against individuals and one count of the murder of six people "while engaged in an act inherently dangerous to others". The battalion commander, Chessani, was charged with one count of violating a lawful order and two counts of dereliction of duty. First Lieutenant Andrew Grayson was charged with obstruction of justice, dereliction of duty, and making a false statement. (He had been charged with deleting photos of the deceased Iraqis in order to obstruct the investigation. He had also been charged with failing to notify the Marine Corps administrative chain of command of his legal status when his term of service was expired and he was discharged from the Marine Corps.) Captain Randy Stone and McConnell were charged with dereliction of duty. Stone also faced an additional count of violating a lawful order.

=== Pre-trial hearings ===
Testimony in an Article 32 investigation for Stone, equivalent to a civilian grand jury proceeding, began on May 8, 2007. At the hearing, Kallop, the platoon commander who ordered Marines to "clear" four houses, testified that the rules of engagement were followed and that no mistakes had been made. He stated that a Marine on the scene had reported seeing a suspected insurgent in the vicinity. Kallop also believed that small arms fire was being directed from the first house attacked by the Marines.

On May 9, Dela Cruz, who received immunity in return for testimony, testified that he watched Wuterich shoot five Iraqis who were attempting to surrender. Dela Cruz further testified that both he and Wuterich fired into the bodies of the five after they were dead, and that he had urinated on one of the dead Iraqis.

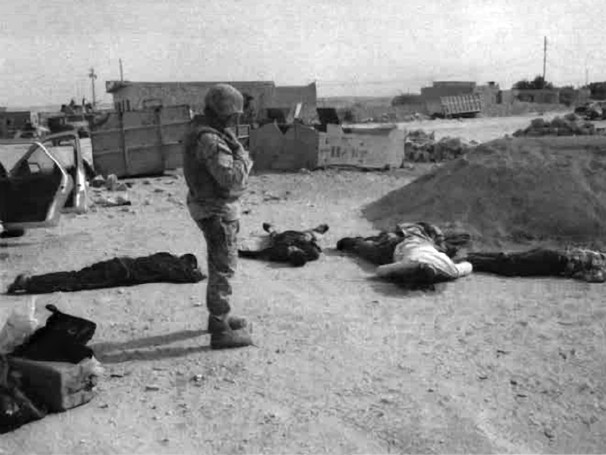
Several victims lying on the ground

No weapons were found in the white taxi.

The US military attempted to subpoena material from a 60 Minutes interview with Wuterich, specifically material where Wuterich admitted to ordering his men to "shoot first and ask questions later." The interview includes Wuterich insisting he perceived a threat from house 1, but saw no gunfire from that house and that he saw no insurgent enter that house. He suggests he saw the dead family in house 1 and proceeded to assault house 2 based on a guess that the gunman may have entered that house. The Marines knocked on the door of house 2, and when someone came to answer they fired through the door, killing what they saw to be an unarmed man. They then assaulted the house and killed the family inside. Wuterich later said he believed there was probably no threat to begin with.

The Article 32 investigation recommended Stone's criminal charge be dismissed, but that he face a new lesser charge that would be handled administratively for failing to investigate the incident properly.

Lt. Col. Jeffrey Chessani was recommended to face court-martial for having "failed to thoroughly and accurately report and investigate a combat action that clearly needed scrutiny." On June 17, 2008, Military Judge Colonel Steven Folsom dismissed all charges against Chessani on the grounds that General James Mattis, who approved the filing of charges against Chessani, was improperly influenced by an investigator probing the incident. The ruling was without prejudice, which allows the prosecution to refile.

Lt. Col. Paul Ware, the Investigating Officer for several of the enlisted Marines, recommended on July 11, 2007, that LCpl. Justin Sharratt be cleared of these charges. Ware stated, "[t]he government version is unsupported by independent evidence... To believe the government version of facts is to disregard clear and convincing evidence to the contrary."

Article 32 hearings for Tatum began July 16, and for Wuterich began in August. The investigating officer recommended charges be dropped against Tatum.

=== Charges dropped ===
On April 17, 2007, the Marine Corps dropped all charges against Dela Cruz in exchange for his testimony. Seven other Marines involved in the incident were also granted immunity.

On August 9, 2007, all charges against Sharratt, Donahue, and Stone were dropped. On October 19, Sharratt's commanding officer decided the charges should be lowered to involuntary manslaughter, reckless endangerment and aggravated assault.

On September 18, 2007, all charges against McConnell were dropped in exchange for immunity and his cooperation with the investigation.

On March 28, 2008, all charges against Tatum were dropped.

On June 17, 2008, all charges against Chessani were dismissed by the military judge citing unlawful command influence. The Marine Corps appealed that ruling in 2008. On March 17, 2009, a military appeals court upheld the dismissal of the war crimes charges against Chessani. Facing an administrative Board of Inquiry, it also found no misconduct and recommended that Chessani be allowed to retire without loss of rank.

On June 5, 2008, Grayson was acquitted of all charges.

=== Trial of Wuterich ===
The court martial of Wuterich, the only defendant to stand trial for the Haditha killings, took place in January 2012. During the trial, Dela Cruz testified that he (Dela Cruz) urinated on the skull of one of the dead Iraqis. He also testified, after describing how Wuterich shot the passengers of the car from close range, "Sergeant Wuterich approached me and told me if anyone asks, the Iraqis were running away from the car and the Iraqi army shot them". In a plea deal, Wuterich pleaded guilty to dereliction of duty, while charges of assault and manslaughter were dropped. He was convicted of a single count of negligent dereliction of duty on January 24, 2012, receiving a rank reduction and pay cut but avoiding jail time.

=== Separation ordered for witnesses ===
In mid April 2012, Secretary of the Navy Ray Mabus informed Commandant General Jim Amos of the Marine Corps that he had reviewed the Haditha incident and ordered Dela Cruz and Mendoza separated from the Navy after they had testified in the trial of Wuterich. Mabus said in the letter that his review of Dela Cruz and Mendoza's cases "revealed troubling information about their conduct". He cited false statements Dela Cruz made about the circumstances surrounding the deaths of five men found next to a white car at the scene. He said Mendoza also lied and withheld information, without citing specifics. "Such conduct is wholly inconsistent with the core values of the Department of the Navy," Mabus said in the letter to Amos. "You are directed to immediately initiate administrative processing for Dela Cruz and Mendoza for administrative separation in the best interest of the service." During Wuterich's trial, Mendoza and Dela Cruz acknowledged on the witness stand that they had lied to investigators to protect the squad. They told jurors that later they decided it was time to tell the truth. Both Marines were allowed to submit rebuttals to the separation proceeding. Both Marines were separated.

== Reaction ==
United States General Michael Hagee discusses the Marine Corps' public relations management of the massacre

According to former Democratic advisor Sidney Blumenthal in a Salon Magazine article,

The coverup at Haditha reportedly began instantly. However, an Iraqi journalism student shot a video the day after of the bloodstained and bullet-riddled houses where the massacre had occurred. That video made its way to an Iraqi human rights group and finally to Tim McGirk, a correspondent from Time magazine. When Time made its first queries, the Marine spokesman, Capt. Jeffrey S. Pool, who had issued the first statement on Haditha as an action against terrorists months earlier, told reporters that they were falling for al-Qaida propaganda. 'I cannot believe you're buying any of this,' he wrote in an e-mail. Nonetheless, word reached Lt. Gen. Peter W. Chiarelli, the second-highest-ranking U.S. military officer in Iraq, that there had been no investigation and he ordered one immediately.

According to the Los Angeles Times, military and congressional sources distinguished between two squads: the original Marine squad involved in the explosion and shootings, and a Marine intelligence squad that took photos shortly after the shootings. According to LA Times sources, no investigation occurred until after a March 2006 Time magazine story alleging a massacre, even though the intelligence squad's photos were inconsistent with the Marine squad's report of a firefight. According to the LA Times story, military officials blamed the delay of the investigation on the Marine squad's efforts to cover up the events. However, both military and congressional sources said that the "intelligence team" that took photos after the firefight did not appear to have participated in any improper action, nor delayed reporting their findings.

The same LA Times story quoted Republican Representative John Kline of Minnesota:

There is no question that the Marines involved, those doing the shooting, they were busy in lying about it and covering it up—there is no question about it. But I am confident, as soon as the command learned there might be some truth to this, they started to pursue it vigorously. I don't have any reason now to think there was any foot dragging.

In June 2006, Iraqi Prime Minister Nouri al-Maliki condemned the killings and called for a swift investigation, saying, "The crime and misery of Haditha ... is a terrible crime where women and children were eliminated."

John Dickerson and Dahlia Lithwick of Slate suggested that the Iraqis should be able to put the Marines on trial:

Let's let the Iraqis put the Americans alleged to have committed these crimes on trial. The United States wants to encourage the fledgling Iraqi institution of democracy, right? That's why we wanted Saddam tried in Iraq, and through the Iraqi judicial system--both to build up its legitimacy and to give Iraqis the sense of ownership that comes with having control over the legal process. Why, then, shouldn't we also turn over our own soldiers who were involved in either the Haditha massacre or any of the other possible massacres for trial under the Iraqi justice system?

=== Comments by Representative Murtha ===
On May 17, 2006, Democratic Representative John Murtha of Pennsylvania, a retired Marine colonel and critic of the war, stated at a news conference that an internal investigation had confirmed the massacre. He was quoted as saying:

There was no firefight, there was no IED (improvised explosive device) that killed these innocent people. Our troops overreacted because of the pressure on them, and they killed innocent civilians in cold blood.

On August 2, 2006, Wuterich, who led the accused squad, filed suit for libel and invasion of privacy. The filing alleged that Murtha had damaged the Marines' reputation by telling news organizations that the troops "killed innocent civilians in cold blood" and had covered it up. Wuterich was charged with nine counts of manslaughter in 2008, and Wuterich's lawsuit against Murtha was dismissed in 2009, as the court had determined Murtha was immune, having made his comments as a lawmaker.

On September 25, 2008, Sharratt filed a slander suit against Murtha. The lawsuit stated that "Sharratt, in being labeled repeatedly by Murtha as a 'cold-blooded murderer', and by Murtha outrageously claiming that the Haditha incident was comparable to the infamous (My Lai) massacre of Vietnam, has suffered permanent, irreversible damage to his reputation." In 2011, Sharratt's lawsuit was dismissed by the 3rd Circuit Court of Appeals.

=== Comparisons with My Lai massacre and other incidents ===
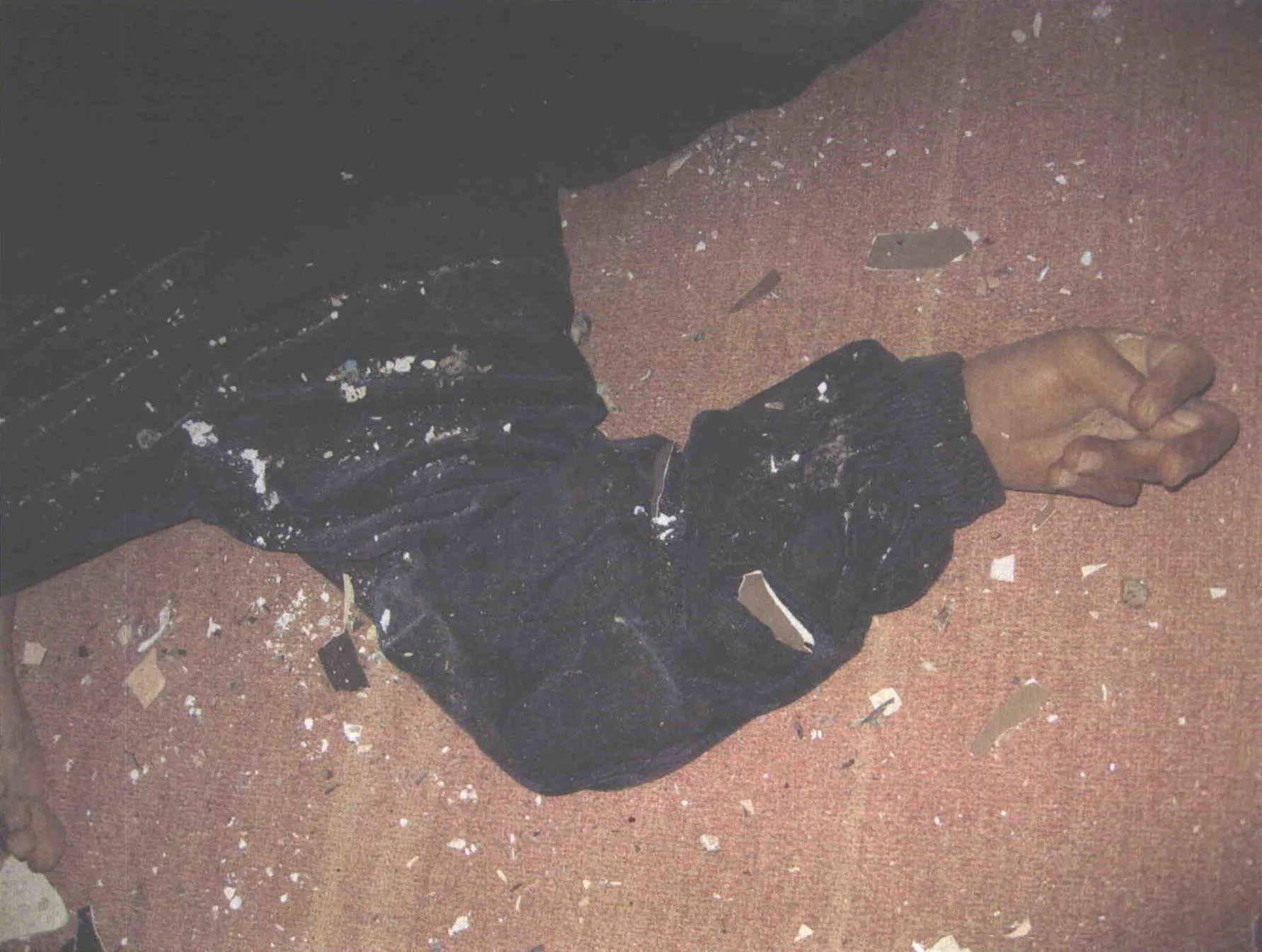
66-year-old Khomeisa Tuma Ali, who was shot and killed in the first house the Marines entered.

Many news reports compared the Haditha killings to the 1968 My Lai massacre of 504 villagers during the Vietnam War, with some commentators describing it as "Bush's My Lai", or "Iraq's My Lai". The killings were often described as part of a wider pattern of human rights abuses committed by American forces in Iraq. As a Der Spiegel reporter noted in an interview with Michael D. Sallah, who won a Pulitzer Prize for his investigation of atrocities committed by Tiger Force in Vietnam, "you would have difficulties finding a single newspaper in Germany, or elsewhere in Europe, that does not deal with My Lai, Abu Ghraib, and Haditha in the same commentary." Some rejected the comparison, however, including prominent journalist Christopher Hitchens who stated in a June 2006 essay that:

...all the glib talk about My Lai is so much propaganda and hot air. In Vietnam, the rules of engagement were such as to make an atrocity – the slaughter of the My Lai villagers took almost a day rather than a white-hot few minutes – overwhelmingly probable. The ghastliness was only stopped by a brave officer who prepared his chopper-gunner to fire. In those days there were no precision-guided missiles, but there were "free-fire zones", and "body counts", and other virtual incitements to psycho officers such as Capt. Medina and Lt. Calley. As a consequence, a training film about My Lai – "if anything like this happens, you have really, truly screwed up" – has been in use for U. S. soldiers for some time.

The most frequent parallel drawn between the My Lai massacre and Haditha massacre is the military instinct to cover-up and whitewash civilian deaths. Professor Martin Shaw pointed out on the analysis website OpenDemocracy, that of the 22 officers put on trial for the My Lai massacre, all were acquitted except for Lieutenant William Calley, who served only three and a half years of his life sentence. Shaw observed that "in the few cases in which soldiers have been accused over atrocities in Iraq and Afghanistan, convictions have been few and far between."

Comparisons have also been made to the case of Ilario Pantano, who was initially charged with premeditated murder in Iraq but this was dropped after it was determined there was no credible evidence or testimony. Pantano himself has spoken out in defense of the "Haditha Marines", objecting to what he called a "rush to judgement".

It was suggested that the Haditha killings might, like the My Lai Massacre, have resulted in further reduction of American public support for the conflict. The killings have also been compared to killings in Afghanistan, particularly the 2007 Shinwar shooting.

=== Allegations of investigative failures ===
Family, friends, defense lawyers, and right-wing radio host Michael Savage strongly criticized the Naval Criminal Investigative Service (NCIS) for its role in the case. They highlighted the string of immunities that were granted as a sign of NCIS bungling.

In December 2011, 400 pages of classified notes from top-secret interviews with US soldiers about the killings were discovered in a dump on the outskirts of Baghdad. Also in December 2011, The Washington Post published NCIS photographs of the aftermath of the killings.

=== Iraqi people ===
Iraqis expressed disbelief and voiced outrage after the six-year US military prosecution ended with none of the Marines sentenced to jail. The Iraqi government said that the ruling did "not fit the crime" and that it plans legal action on behalf of families of victims killed. Survivor Awis Fahmi Hussein commented.

I was expecting that the American judiciary would sentence this person to life in prison and that he would appear and confess in front of the whole world that he committed this crime, so that America could show itself as democratic and fair.

Youssef Ayid, who lost four brothers in the Haditha raid, said, "We are sad to see the criminals escape justice". "This is an assault on humanity" said Khalid Salman, a Haditha councillor and lawyer for the victims. He also said the sentence did not "mean the end" of his legal efforts. "There are orphans, widows and old people who are still suffering and hurting from that terrible massacre. ...If we find no way, we will go to the international courts." Abdul Rahman Najm al-Mashhadani, president of the Hammurabi Human Rights Organization, stated that "Haditha stripped Iraqis of any illusion about the US military’s intent. They didn’t come to liberate, but to conquer [...] After Haditha, no Iraqi still respected the US government."

== Media ==
Battle for Haditha is a 2007 drama film directed by British director Nick Broomfield based on the incident.

House Two is a 2018 documentary directed by Michael Epstein that follows the investigation and court case.

"Murder in House Two" is a 2020 podcast written and produced by Michael Epstein that investigates a potential multi-level government conspiracy and cover-up surrounding the U.S. military's handling of the Haditha massacre. Epstein secured exclusive access to Naval Criminal Investigative Service (NCIS) agents, many of whom provided on-the-record testimony.

Season three of the podcast In the Dark looks further into the military's investigation of the massacre. Through Freedom of Information Act requests, they obtained more than 10,000 pages of documents and photographs from inside the homes.

== See also ==
- 2004 Fallujah ambush
- Battle of Haditha
- Human rights in post-invasion Iraq
- Ilario Pantano

=== Incidents ===
- Tal Afar checkpoint shooting
- Ishaqi incident
- Mahmudiyah rape and killings
- Mukaradeeb wedding party massacre
- FOB Ramrod kill team in War in Afghanistan
- Abu Ghraib torture and prisoner abuse
- Kandahar massacre
- My Lai Massacre

== Works cited ==
- Ayres, Tom (2014). "Haditha: A Case Study in Response to War Crimes". In Lovell, David W. (ed.). Investigating Operational Incidents in a Military Context. International Humanitarian Law. Vol. 43. Brill–Nijhoff. pp. 87–97. doi:10.1163/9789004277106_007. ISBN 978-90-04-27710-6.
- Baran, Madeleine (August 6, 2024). "Sounds Like Murder". In the Dark. Season 3. Episode 3. The New Yorker.
- Baran, Madeleine (September 17, 2024). "Patient #8". In the Dark. Season 3. Episode 9. The New Yorker.
- Knarr, William; Alford, Dale; Hawkins, Mary; Graves, David; Goodman, Jennifer; Dobson, Matthew; Leonard, Carolyn; Frost, John; King, Tracy; Jones, Thomas; Saiegh, Munther; Leonard, Alan; Coursey, Matt (May 2016). Al Sahawa—The Awakening Volume III-B: Al Anbar Province, Area of Operations Denver, Hadithah–Hit Corridor (PDF) (Report). Institute for Defense Analyses.
- Smith, Thomas W. (2017). "Who's Responsible? Justice and Accountability". Human Rights and War Through Civilian Eyes. University of Pennsylvania Press. pp. 149–178. ISBN 978-0-8122-4863-0. JSTOR j.ctv2t4c9z.8.
