= Les Nouvelles Egotistes =

Les Nouvelles Egotistes is a grouping of documentary filmmakers who make films where they themselves are featured. This is against the grain of more traditional documentary film which is mainly voyeuristic observation.

== Characteristics ==
Films in the style of Les Nouvelles Egotistes are reflexive, insofar as there are two subjects of the film - the filmmaker and the "reality" which they are filming.

Usually the filmmakers are "faux-naïf", pretending to be less knowing than they really are in order to "trap" the subject, however amongst the key names both Michael Moore and Nick Broomfield can be very aggressive when necessary.

== History ==
This style of filmmaking showed presence in 1986, with Ross McElwee's Sherman's March: A Meditation on the Possibility of Romantic Love in the South during an Era of Nuclear Weapons Proliferation. For much of this film, McElwee was talking to camera, giving accounts of how he thought the production was going.

It was in the same year that Nick Broomfield was making a film about Lily Tomlin and realised that all of the best bits - the dead ends, the arguments, the mistakes - were being left out. For his 1988 feature Driving Me Crazy and subsequent features, then, Broomfield perfected this new style, "reinventing" documentary film.

Following this, more documentary makers followed Broomfield's example - key examples are Michael Moore, Jon Ronson (who was responsible for naming the movement in a 2002 issue of Sight & Sound), and more recently Louis Theroux.

The movement was named relatively recently, and is an informal assertion by Jon Ronson which happens to have been adopted by many film journalists.

The style has become increasingly popular over recent years, being adopted by many documentary filmmakers, such as Reggie Yates.

This wikipedia page totally omits women in trailblazing this, for example Agnes Varda.

== Key Films ==
- Sherman's March by Ross McElwee, 1986
- Driving Me Crazy by Nick Broomfield, 1988
- The Leader, His Driver and the Driver's Wife by Nick Broomfield, 1991
- Kurt & Courtney by Nick Broomfield, 1998
- Bowling for Columbine by Michael Moore, 2002
- Biggie and Tupac by Nick Broomfield, 2002
- Louis and the Nazis by Louis Theroux, 2003
- Fahrenheit 9/11 by Michael Moore, 2004
- My Scientology Movie by Louis Theroux, 2016
