= Hammurabi Human Rights Organization =

- Founded: 2005; Iraq
- Type: Nonprofit; INGO
- Services: Protecting human rights
- Website: www.hhro.org/en

The Hammurabi Human Rights Organization (also known as HHRO), founded in 2005, is a non-profit organization located in Iraq. The organization focuses on human rights on the local and international level. It also focuses on rights for minority groups within Iraq like Yezidis, Sabian, Mandaen, Turkoman, Assyrians, Armenians and more. Its goal is to provide not only documentation for human rights abuses but also to provide humanitarian aid in Iraq. It focuses on vulnerable groups that are more likely to have their rights violated like children and women. To raise awareness about the issues, HHRO publishes an annual report on the human rights situation in Iraq. It looks at what are the violations and who are the violators.

== History ==
The ideal of creating the Hammurabi Human Rights organization first started in mid-2003 after there was a shift in the government of Iraq. Mr. William Warda and Ms. Pascale Warda started the organization in the Nineveh region of Iraq. Their goal was to get activist involved and to try to expand civil society. They saw that there was a lack of security and more acts of human rights violation across Iraq and decided to act. It was not until April 1, 2005, that the organization would become an NGO. With the Wardas' coordination, it was able to get activists on board with their ideal and formed an official NGO to promote and protect human rights in Iraq.

== Purpose ==
The primary purpose of the Hammurabi Human Rights Organization is to defend human rights on the domestic level (regional and national) then on the international level. To do so, it concentrates on tracking Iraqi government policy and the international treaties that Iraq has signed and ratified. The HHRO monitors the implication of those policies and international treaties, while at the same time trying to watch over the legislative, executive and judicial branches to make sure that none violates human rights. They also work with Iraqi communities to educate them on the importance of human rights, especially for vulnerable groups. To do so, they produce annual reports to showcase the violation of human rights of the Iraqi people and foreigners living in the country. By organizing seminars and workshops they provide opportunities to educate and raise awareness of core human rights issues. The organization also tries to prevent future human rights violations by raising awareness among the three branches of government. HHRO has also developed, during the years since its creation, key partnership with other organizations in the region to further advance in their goals.

== Funding and membership ==
Most of the funding for the organization comes from donations from across the world. All are welcome to join the organization by completing a form. The board of directors are responsible for admitting new members and can have up to 10% of the total amount in the organization.

== Staff ==
The HHRO was created by Pascale Warda, a former Iraqi Minister for Displacement and Migration. Pascale Warda is an Assyrian and Catholic Iraqi, born in Dahuk. She has worked with many organizations before creating the HHRO: Assyrian Women's Union, Assyrian Aid Society-Iraq and the Iraqi Women's Center for Development situated in Baghdad. The co-founder of HHRO is her husband William Warda. He has also been part of different human rights group in the region like Alliance of Iraqi Minorities. William Warda also played a political role in the early 2000s. He served as the leader of the political and military department for the Assyrian Democratic Movement.

== Projects ==
=== Annual reports ===
Since 2007, the HHRO have published annual reports on the human rights situation in Iraq. Each year they focused on a key element in Iraqi society . The 2007 and 2009 reports were short and focused on human rights violations affecting Christians in Iraq. They denounced the decline security situation of the country and a lack of government efforts to stop these violations. To obtain their data they relied on statistics that they researched themselves. The 2011, 2014 and 2015 reports focused on all minority groups and human rights violations committed against these groups, not just on Christian groups. From this point onward, the organization focused strongly on minority groups and how the geopolitical situation of Iraq affected them. The 2016 report once again shifted in its content to focus on all human rights abuses in Iraq. It looks at how the group Islamic State (IS) has affected the human rights situation. The organization also focuses on internally displaced people.

=== Christian Solidarity ===
HHRO joined Christian Solidarity International (CSI) in efforts to visit and organize the distribution of relief aid to internally displaced people (IDPs) in the region of Mosul and Baghdad. The relief aid consisted of essential goods for the population like food, milk and more. HHRO sees the opportunity to work with other NGOs in the region as a way to demonstrate that they are committed to help prevent and bring relief to all ethnic groups in the country. HHRO has also played a role with CSI in helping and providing aid to Christian minority group fleeing the terror group IS in Iraq. With the growing presence of the terror group since 2014, HHRO has seen an increase in its activities of delivering aid to affected regions and cities like Mosul with organization like Christian Solidarity. Their partnership has influenced Christian groups across the region that were under IS rules.

=== Ceasefire Project ===
The Ceasefire project is a programme supported by the European Union that monitors human rights abuses in Iraq. The goal of the project is that NGOs and civilian monitors the human rights abuses. The project focuses on groups such as women, children, ethnic and religious minorities, internally displaced persons (IDPs) and more. By doing so, the project hopes to entrust NGOs with the power and the capacity to create a system that can help these affected groups by the situation in Iraq. HHRO is a main contributor to the project. Its task is to research, find, help promote human rights and to try to assist those who have been victims of human rights abuses.

=== Anticipating future human rights violation ===
HHRO has noted that the advance of military force to defeat IS will not necessarily resolve human right violations against minorities. William Warda, co-founder of the organization, has stated that most Internally Displaced People (IDP) from Mosul would not come back if the coalition forces recaptured Mosul. He believed so because the liberation of Mosul from IS will not mean necessarily lead to law and order, giving the example of the Yazidis in the Sinjar region. Warda points out the historical facts of the country, stating that since Iraqi's independence in 1932 minority groups such has Christian and Yazidis had suffered atrocities.

=== Ethnic context ===
HHRO started out promoting and safeguarding Assyrian and Christians minority human rights but quickly expanded to cover all minority groups in Iraq, especially with the rise of the Islamic State in the region. To help achieve this goal, they have worked closely with the CeaseFire Project. They have also expanded their reach within Iraq with this project. HHRO is able, with the CeaseFire Project, to help distant minority groups that live in a rural parts of Iraq or in the midst of a military conflict.

== U.S. partners ==
HHRO has an active role in broadcasting human rights violations against minority groups conducted by the terror group IS in Iraq. It has teamed up with the U.S. Agency for International Development (USAID) to help relay information about the ongoing situation. The U.S. government has been known to work with organizations like HHRO and others to help understand and find solutions to human rights violations in Iraq. With the help of organizations like HHRO that have boots on the ground, USAID has a better knowledge of the situation and thus, can have a more precise response to the human rights violation in Iraq.

== Other partners ==
HHRO is a regional organization focused on the promotion and protection of human rights in Iraq. It has worked with the United States government to help further its agenda since the U.S. was and still is a major player in Iraq. HHRO does not have many international partners. It has been to Jordan to promote its agenda but not to monitor the situation of refuge camps. HHRO has also worked with the UN High Commissioner for Refugees.

== Awards ==
In 2013, United States Deputy Secretary of State William J. Burns gave the award of Human Rights Defenders to the Hammurabi Human Rights Organization stating that the group demonstrated effectiveness in advocacy for human rights, achievement in protecting female prisoners, and important work in trying to improve religious freedom in Iraq. The group was praised for not only defending human rights and reporting on human rights abuses, but also seeking solutions. It was stated that they are one of the few groups in Iraq that understand that if they want to see real change they have to work with the government and not only oppose it. The award was received by William Warda, Pascale Warda and 13 members of the organization that came from Iraq. This award is given every year to an NGO or activity that demonstrates exceptional work in advocating and playing a leadership role in the protection of human rights.

The main activities of the organization are monitoring human rights violations, campaigning for the rights of women, children and minorities within Iraq, and providing aid to internally displaced persons in Iraq.

The HHRO helped to investigate and document the shooting of civilians in the Haditha massacre.

== Etymology ==
The organization takes its name from the ancient Babylonian Code of Hammurabi.

== See also ==
- Thaer Thabet
