= Frank Wuterich =

Participant in massacre of Iraqi civilians

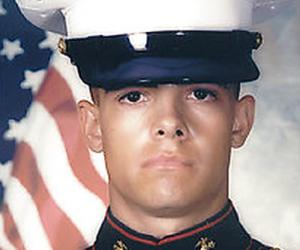
- Born: February 28, 1980 (age 46); New London, Connecticut, U.S.
- Military career
- Allegiance: United States
- Branch: United States Marine Corps
- Service years: 1998–2012
- Rank: Private (reduced in rank from staff sergeant)
- Unit: 3rd Battalion, 1st Marines
- Conflicts: Iraq War
- Awards: Navy Unit Commendation; Navy Meritorious Unit Commendation; Marine Corps Good Conduct Medal; National Defense Service Medal; Iraq Campaign Medal; Global War on Terrorism Service Medal; Sea Service Deployment Ribbon

Frank D. Wuterich (born February 28, 1980) is a former United States Marine Corps Staff Sergeant who pleaded guilty to negligent dereliction of duty as a result of his actions during the Haditha massacre where multiple innocent civilians were murdered. As a result of the plea agreement, he was reduced in rank to private and was given a general discharge in February 2012, avoiding jail time.

== Background ==
Wuterich grew up in Meriden, Connecticut. In Hawaii, he met and married former wife Marisol with whom he has three daughters. Wuterich was serving his second tour of duty in Iraq when the Haditha massacre occurred.

== Haditha massacre ==
According to news reports Wuterich was the senior Marine on patrol (no commissioned officers being present), and after the massacre, lied to his commanding officers by stating that 15 of the dead Iraqi civilians were killed in the same IED explosion that touched off the incident. Time magazine has reported that military investigators had placed Wuterich in at least two of the houses in which the killings took place.

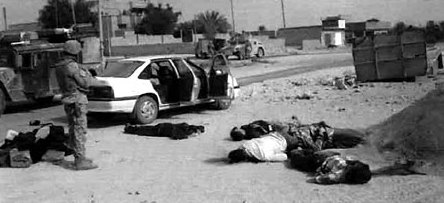
Several passengers of the white taxi killed by Wuterich and his squad

On June 11, 2006, the Washington Post reported a detailed account of Wuterich's version of events as relayed via his attorney, Neal A. Puckett.

Many news reports have contradicted Wuterich's version of events, claiming that the Marines entered several houses and deliberately killed civilians. Besides photographic evidence of the killings provided by Iraqi journalism student Taher Thabet, there was also testimony from a young Iraqi girl who survived by hiding. The girl described having watched the Marines shoot her family members systematically. The photographs and forensic evidence were later used to corroborate the girl's version of events.

Since being named in news reports in connection with the massacre, several of Wuterich's family members have spoken out in his defense. Wuterich's father, Dave Wuterich, told the Associated Press that “I just don't believe that he [Frank Wuterich] would do something like that.” Previously, Wuterich's former wife, Marisol, had praised Wuterich in blog postings. On June 19, 2007, Marisol Wuterich and her father-in-law were interviewed on Fox News Channel's Hannity and Colmes, both said that they back Frank Wuterich “100 percent”.

10-years-veteran Captain James Kimber (born 1973), Lieutenant Colonel Jeffrey R. Chessani, and Captain Luke McConnell, according to a report by The Times on May 29, 2006, were all relieved of their duties on suspicion of inadequate reporting of or investigation into the Haditha massacre.

== Unsuccessful defamation suit ==
On August 2, 2006, Wuterich filed a lawsuit against Representative John Murtha of Pennsylvania for libel and invasion of privacy. Wuterich claimed that Murtha had defamed Wuterich's image by accusing the Marines of "cold-blooded murder" with respect to the Haditha killings.

On September 1, 2007, news outlets reported on a hearing of Sgt. Sanick Dela Cruz, a subordinate of Wuterich at the time of the Haditha incident, in which Dela Cruz testified against Wuterich. Specifically, Cruz stated under oath that Wuterich shot five Iraqi men who appeared to be unarmed bystanders at the scene just seconds after the roadside bomb exploded and subsequently told Cruz to falsely state that the men were running away, behavior that would have justified firing on them under the Marines' operative rules of engagement. Cruz also testified that Wuterich had said to him just one week earlier that "If we ever get hit [by an IED] again, we should kill everybody in that vicinity...so to teach them a lesson."

In September 2008, District Judge Rosemary M. Collyer denied a motion to dismiss the suit and ordered Murtha to give a deposition in the case. However, on April 14, 2009, a three-judge panel of the U.S. Court of Appeals for the District of Columbia Circuit overturned the order and dismissed the suit, ruling that the suit was barred by the Federal Employees Liability Reform and Tort Compensation Act of 1988 (Westfall Act), which protects federal employees from being sued personally for actions done in the course of their official duties.

== De la Cruz testimony ==
Sergeant Sanick De la Cruz was on the mission that day. He agreed to testify for the prosecution in exchange for immunity. He changed the story he had previously told about the events of the day. In particular, his new story about the men in the white car differed from the version told by the defense and by forensic experts.

On September 2, 2007, an updated re-airing of 60 Minutes, narrated by Scott Pelley, disclosed that Wuterich did not have to go to Iraq, but went because "he wanted to see war." Pelley also revealed that all charges had since been dropped against Sanick De la Cruz and two others.

De la Cruz recounted his story in an in-depth profile in the July 2008 edition of Chicago Magazine, speaking about the ordeal to a journalist for the first time.

== Court-martial and plea agreement ==
On December 21, 2006, the U.S. military charged eight Marines (four enlisted and four officers) in connection with the Haditha killings. The four enlisted, including Wuterich were charged with 13 counts of unpremeditated murder, while the officers were charged with covering up the killings and failing to investigate properly. Six of the cases were dropped and one officer was acquitted at court-martial. When announcing the charges, Colonel Stewart Navarre said, "We now know with certainty the press release was incorrect and that none of the civilians were killed by the IED explosion."

In September 2007, the Article 32 hearing investigating officer, Lieutenant Colonel Paul Ware, recommended that Wuterich should be tried for the lesser offense of negligent homicide in the deaths of two women and five children, and that charges of murder be dropped. Ware wrote: "I believe after reviewing all the evidence that no trier of fact can conclude Staff Sgt. Wuterich formed the criminal intent to kill. When a Marine fails to exercise due care and civilians die, the charge of negligent homicide, and not murder, is appropriate ... The case against Staff Sgt. Wuterich is simply not strong enough to conclude he committed murder beyond a reasonable doubt. Almost all witnesses have an obvious bias or prejudice."

Wuterich was expected to be back in court to face nine counts of manslaughter in early 2010. After several postponements, the court-martial finally took place in January 2012. On 23 January 2012, all jurors at his court martial were dismissed after Wuterich pleaded guilty to one count of negligent dereliction of duty in a plea deal, approved by Lieutenant General Waldhauser, the commander of Marine Forces Central Command. As part of the agreement, the charges of assault and manslaughter were dropped and Wuterich would avoid jail time but would be reduced in rank to private and a pay cut. On January 24, 2012, Wuterich was convicted of dereliction of duty according to the plea agreement. Wuterich received a general discharge from the Marine Corps on February 17, 2012.
