= Elliot Ruiz =

American actor and Marine (born 1985)

- Born: Philadelphia, Pennsylvania, United States
- Occupation: Actor
- Years active: 2005 – present

Elliot Ruiz (born 1985) is an American film actor and a former U.S. Marine.

== Early life and career ==
Ruiz was born in Philadelphia, Pennsylvania. He graduated from Thomas A. Edison High School in 2002. Ruiz joined the U.S. Marine Corps when he was 17 years old, and with six months into his service he was sent to Iraq – as the youngest Marine in his division.

The war ended for him in April 2004 when an Iraqi drove a car through barbed wire at a checkpoint, and the wire almost tore Ruiz's leg apart. Doctors told him he would never walk again, but eventually he started to jog and run around. In 2005 he turned to acting, as he got his first movie role in a low budget movie Shapeshifter. In 2007 he got his break with acclaimed drama film Battle for Haditha, which was directed by British director Nick Broomfield. He was also a cast in the short film Juggling in Mosul (2009). Ruiz could next be seen in a war film 21 and a Wake-Up (2010), starring Amy Acker, Danica McKellar and Faye Dunaway.
