= Warda (name) =

Warda (Egyptian Arabic: [ˈwæɾdæ]; Rose) is a feminine given name and a surname. Notable people with the name are as follows:

== Given name ==
=== First name ===
- Warda Al-Jazairia (1939–2012), Algerian-French singer
- Warda al Turk (1797–1873), Lebanese poet
- Warda al-Yaziji (1838–1924), Lebanese poet

=== Middle name ===
- Medina Warda Aulia (born 1997), Indonesian chess player

== Surname ==
- Amr Warda (born 1993), Egyptian football player
- Bashar Warda (born 1969), Iraqi Chaldean Catholic cleric
- Giwargis Warda, Syriac poet
- Mahmoud Abu Warda (born 1995), Palestinian football player
- Maryse Warda (born 1961), Egyptian Canadian translator
- Mohsen Medhat Warda (born 1955), Egyptian basketball player
- Pascal Esho Warda (born 1961), Iraqi Assyrian politician
- William Warda (born 1961), Iraqi Assyrian journalist
- Yussuf Abu-Warda (born 1953), Arab-Palestinian actor
