= Warda =

Warda or WARDA may refer to:

- Warda (name), list of people with the name
- Wardah (restaurant), restaurant in South Korea
- Warda, Texas, an unincorporated community in Texas
- West Africa Rice Development Association, an agricultural research centre based in Bouaké, Côte d'Ivoire
- Wardha, Maharashtra, India
