= The Stones and Brian Jones =

2023 British documentary film

- Directed by: Nick Broomfield
- Written by: Nick Broomfield; Marc Hoeferlin
- Produced by: Nick Broomfield; Shani Hinton; Marc Hoeferlin; Kyle Gibbon
- Production company: Lafayette Films
- Distributed by: Magnolia Pictures (Unid States)
- Release dates: 15 May 2023 (BBC Two and BBC iPlayer)
- Running time: 93 minutes
- Country: United Kingdom
- Language: English

The Stones and Brian Jones is a 2023 British documentary film directed by Nick Broomfield about Brian Jones, a founding member of the Rolling Stones. The film examines Jones's role in forming the band, his musical contribution, his relationships, his marginalization as Mick Jagger and Keith Richards became the group's songwriting focus, and his death in 1969.

The documentary aired on BBC Two and BBC iPlayer in May 2023 and was released in the United States by Magnolia Pictures later that year. Reviews were generally positive and emphasized Broomfield's use of interviews with Jones's former partners and associates, as well as the film's argument that Jones's upbringing and emotional isolation shaped his decline.

== Background and production ==
Broomfield and the United States-based Lafayette Films were behind the documentary, which was produced by Broomfield, Shani Hinton, Marc Hoeferlin, and Kyle Gibbon as a co-commission between BBC Arts and BBC Music for the BBC arts strand Arena. Broomfield said the project came from his long interest in the Rolling Stones and from his memory of meeting Jones on a train when Broomfield was a teenager. Televisual described the film as using interviews with people connected to Jones and previously unseen archival material.

In a feature about the film, Sean O'Hagan of the Guardian wrote that Broomfield uses first-hand testimony and archival footage, with Broomfield appearing through interviews and voiceover rather than as an onscreen character. O'Hagan reported that Broomfield avoids conspiracy theories about Jones's death and instead emphasizes Jones's family background, sudden celebrity, and insecurity.

== Content ==
For RogerEbert.com, Godfrey Cheshire wrote that Broomfield presents Jones as central to the Rolling Stones' early public image and as the person who formed the band and gave it its name, before the group's image and creative centre shifted toward Jagger and Richards. Cheshire wrote that the film's main thesis connects Jones's rise and decline to his relationship with his parents and to his later marginalization inside the band.

Stuart Jeffries of the Guardian wrote that the documentary is strongest when recounting Jones's life through women who knew him, including former partners and mothers of his children. The film also includes commentary from people connected to the Rolling Stones and the 1960s scene, and discusses Jones's blues influences, instrumental contributions, substance use, dismissal from the band, and death.

== Release ==
The Stones and Brian Jones was broadcast on BBC Two and made available through BBC iPlayer in May 2023. In the United States, Magnolia Pictures served as distributor, a limited theatrical release on 7 November 2023, and a streaming release on 17 November 2023.

== Reception ==
On Rotten Tomatoes, The Stones and Brian Jones has a 92 percent Tomatometer rating based on 26 critic reviews. Metacritic assigned the film a weighted average score of 75 out of 100 based on 10 critic reviews, indicating "generally favorable" reviews; the site's critic-review page counted nine positive reviews, one mixed review, and no negative reviews.

Liz Braun gave the film an A for Original-Cin, describing it as a moving documentary that used unseen archive footage to place Jones within the band and the 1960s London scene. Christopher Schobert gave the film a B+ for the Film Stage, writing that Broomfield effectively restored Jones to the Rolling Stones' early history and showed the costs of the band's success, while judging the film's treatment of Jones's final days as brief. Sheri Linden of the Hollywood Reporter called the film vivid and affecting, writing that it used archival material, new commentary from Bill Wyman, and Jones's family history to frame the subject as both creative and self-destructive.

Jeffries, reviewing the film for the Guardian, called it a moving portrait that remembered Jones through people who knew him intimately, while also noting its treatment of Jones's conduct toward women and children. Cheshire gave the film a mixed-to-positive review for RogerEbert.com, praising the Bill Wyman interview and Broomfield's focus on Jones's public image and relationships, but criticizing the film for not examining Jones's instrumental evolution and musical innovations in greater depth. Owen Gleiberman of Variety described the documentary as a dark profile of Jones and wrote that it emphasizes Broomfield's continuing fascination with Jones while probing the "genius" claim around him.

Wes Greene of Slant Magazine gave the film three out of four stars, writing that Broomfield's use of eyewitness accounts and archive material creates an intimate portrait, but that low-resolution video interviews sometimes clash with the archival style. Bob Strauss of the San Francisco Chronicle wrote that the film was likely to appeal to music historians because of its unseen footage and survivor interviews, while finding that Broomfield gave more attention to Jones's personal tragedy than to his artistic accomplishments. Roger Moore of Movie Nation also wrote that the film gave only a glancing account of Jones's musical skill, but called it essential viewing for viewers interested in 1960s music history and the Rolling Stones.
