= Soldier Girls =

1981 film by Nick Broomfield

- Film poster
- Distributed by: First Run Features
- Release date: 1981
- Country: United States
- Language: English

Soldier Girls is a 1981 documentary film by Nick Broomfield and Joan Churchill (who were a married couple at the time of the filming), shot in fourteen weeks in Fort Gordon, Georgia, about several women training in the US army.

== Summary ==
Under the aggressive Sergeant Abing are several young women, some dedicated to defending their country, others who seem to have been forced into joining by circumstance. Several of these recruits become harder and colder through the course of their basic training at Fort Gordon.

== Accolades ==
- BAFTA Award for Best Documentary
- Grand Jury Prize Documentary - Sundance Film Festival

== In popular culture ==
Excerpts from the film are used in U2's song "Seconds" on their third album, War.
