= Luke McConnell =

US Marine Corps officer (born 1975)

Lucas Michael McConnell
- Born: February 17, 1975 (age 51)
- Military career
- Allegiance: United States
- Branch: United States Marine Corps
- Service years: 1997–present
- Rank: Major
- Unit: 3rd Battalion, 1st Marines
- Conflicts: Iraq War

Lucas Michael McConnell (born February 17, 1975) is an officer in the United States Marine Corps. In accordance with standard administrative procedure, he was removed from command of the Camp Pendleton-based Kilo Company, 3rd Battalion, 1st Marines following his role in the Haditha massacre.

== Biography ==
According to reports in a local newspaper, McConnell grew up in Napa, California, and graduated from Vintage High School in 1993, where he was the captain of the football team. He went to study at the United States Naval Academy, graduating in 1997. McConnell started his Marine career as the 1st platoon commander of Bravo Company, 3rd Light Armored Reconnaissance Battalion in 29 Palms, California.

In accordance with standard administrative procedure, he was removed from command of the Camp Pendleton-based Kilo Company, 3rd Battalion, 1st Marines following an alleged November 2005 war crime in Haditha, Iraq, where Marines under his command were accused of having murdered 24 civilians after one of them had been killed in an insurgent attack. According to a report in The Times on 29 May 2006, commanding officer Lieutenant Colonel Jeffrey R. Chessani and 10-years-veteran Captain James Kimber (born 1973) were also removed from command. McConnell was not physically present during the incident but was being investigated for related events that occurred afterwards. Staff Sergeant Frank Wuterich was the Marine leading the patrol.

The Naval Criminal Investigative Service was called in to conduct an inquiry after Time magazine published a report on the killings that said the shooters' officers failed to effectively inquire into the incident. Thirteen months passed between the killings, and the initiation of the NCIS inquiry. NCIS recommended charges in December 2006.

Charges against McConnell have since been dismissed by Lt. Gen. James N. Mattis, commander of the Marine Forces Central Command, after it was decided that any alleged "errors or omissions" made by the Captain would best be handled through an administrative process.
