= Nocturna Artificialia =

1979 short film

- Opening title
- Directed by: Stephen Quay; Timothy Quay
- Cinematography: Craigie Horsfield; Brothers Quay
- Music by: Stefan Cichonsk
- Production company: British Film Institute Production Board
- Distributed by: Zeitgeist Films
- Release date: 1979
- Running time: 21 min.
- Country: United Kingdom
- Languages: English, Polish, German, French

Nocturna Artificialia is the first credited film directed and produced by the Brothers Quay, Timothy and Stephen. "This London-based American identical directing team is known for their avant-garde puppet films." Rather than dialog, this film uses shadows and music to create the dream-like state of the main character and his journey on a red tram at night.

== Plot ==
The story is told in eight parts and begins with a man in his apartment. He sees a red tram out his window and leaves his apartment to wait for the next tram to come by. As he sees the next tram approaching him, he puts his arms up to signal it to stop. At the same time, the wind begins to blow and a curtain from an open window in his apartment complex blows outward toward the sky. He boards the tram and for a while rides through the night continuously looking forward instead of out the windows at the scenery. Finally, in slow motion, he begins to move toward the curtain on the window of the tram and pulls it back. He sees strange objects as he passes through the night (such as a dart board and some tree trunks held up by metal bars). All these objects are the only thing he can see when he passes them because they are engulfed in light, while the areas surrounding the objects is pitch black. As the tram continues on, it appears to disappear around him and he is back in a makeshift version of his apartment looking out the blinds of his window. He closes the blinds and seems to be startled by something. He follows it to the vent in his wall and looks into it. There appears to be nothing in the vent and he turns away disappointed. The wind begins to blow harder outside as another tram passes by his apartment complex. He then gets the idea to take off the screen of his vent and stick his hand into it. As he reaches trying to find anything in the vent the scenery of the movie changes again and he is back riding on the tram holding what looks like a crumbled piece of paper with a blood stain on it. After he sees the paper he passes out in the seat of the tram and awakens in the makeshift version of his apartment. He puts the crumbled, blood-stained paper on a hanger to dry and the movie begins to spin showing different unidentifiable objects. Finally, the movie stops spinning and shows the front of a church. The man is again inside of the red tram, that seems to be driving through the middle of the church, looking out of the window. The screen switches from pitch black to different arts on the inside of the church in the point of view like the audience themselves are riding the tram. Time passes and the man is at a loss of where he is. He looks around confused and again, finds himself in his apartment. It is obvious that time has passed because the lighting is much darker and the mood is much more sleepy. After this, the man is on the tram and the scenery switches between him on the tram and the objects from earlier in the movie. The man is riding along and the tram accelerates. The tram goes faster and faster and the man's head thrusts back as the wind blows against him. This results in him falling off of a chair that he apparently played like it was the tram. He falls backward off the chair and hits his head on the ground. He tries to get up, but fails. More time passes (as can be seen as the light from outside rises and falls) and he is still motionless on the ground as the movie ends.

== Themes ==
There are many different themes seen throughout the short film. These themes include "impressions of a man, a tram and an unidentified city at night (the opening titles identify a specific Brussels street, but the ambiance seems East European)." Much of it seems to be a dream that comes from his fixation with specific objects on the tram. There is a more general view of the streets he wanders at night, but even when he seems to wake up at the end of the film (after experiencing some kind of revelation), he finds tramlines running through the middle of his room. Everything in the film is glimpsed and only half-heard by sound and music, as there is no dialogue. Suspense is created through movement of the tram and (sometimes awkward) angles of the camera. The film tends to shift focus with continuous shadows moving across things around the man's apartment and the tram itself. This personifies the objects by giving them a somewhat eerie life. Religious imagery can also be seen as a theme in the film. At one point the tram passes through the inside of a cathedral, "and then down a street named after the Crucifixion, but these elements seem as half-awake and half-remembered as everything else. Despite being presented in multiple languages (Polish, English, German and French), the eight inter-titles are calculatedly cryptic It's a Surrealist film in the term's original sense - in that its imaginary landscape is equally populated by conscious and unconscious elements and little distinction is drawn between them."

== Release details ==
This short film in colour, with some parts in black and white, was originally released in a 16mm format by the British Film Institute Production Board. The film was released in 1979 and is 21 minutes long.
