= Battle for Haditha =

- Film poster
- Directed by: Nick Broomfield
- Written by: Nick Broomfield; Marc Hoeferlin; Anna Telford
- Produced by: Nick Broomfield
- Starring: Elliot Ruiz; Yasmine Hanani; Hadiitha García Puga
- Cinematography: Mark Wolf
- Edited by: Stuart Gazzard; Ash Jenkins
- Music by: Nick Laird-Clowes
- Distributed by: HanWay Films
- Release dates: September 2007 (Toronto International Film Festival); February 4, 2008 (United Kingdom)
- Running time: 93 minutes
- Country: United Kingdom
- Languages: English; Arabic
- Box office: $245,521

Battle for Haditha is a 2007 drama film directed by British director Nick Broomfield based on the Haditha killings. Dramatising real events using a documentary style, Battle for Haditha is Broomfield's follow up to Ghosts. The film was aired on Channel 4 in the UK on 17 March 2008.

== Plot ==
The film is inspired by the Haditha killings incident that occurred three months after the Battle of Haditha in the Iraq War. On 19 November 2005 in Haditha, a city in the western Iraqi province of Al Anbar, 24 unarmed Iraqi men, women, and children were killed by a group of United States Marines following an incident where an I.E.D killed one Marine and seriously wounded two others.

== Cast ==
- Elliot Ruiz as Cpl Ramirez, a Marine who loses his composure after watching a friend die
- Andrew McLaren as Captain Sampson, the tough company commander in Charge of Cpl Ramirez
- Jase Willette as PFC Cuthbert, the young Marine whose death sets off the chain of events
- Yasmine Hanani as Hiba, a young Iraqi woman stuck in the middle of the chaos
- Eric Mehalacopoulos as the no-nonsense Sgt Ross
- Nathan Delacruz a former United States Marine plays Cpl Marcus with his infamous comical one liners
- Falah Flayla as a former Iraqi Army officer turned insurgent
- Thomas Hennessy Jr. as a Navy corpsman assigned to Kilo company

== Production ==
Shot in Jerash, Jordan, the film uses former US Military personnel and Iraqi refugees to play many of the roles. However, the film was shot in an unconventional way – it was shot sequentially enabling the cast to build their characters as the story progressed. It also used real locations, and a very small documentary style film crew. This greatly added to the feeling of reality. Actors, while working from a detailed script, and the final form of the film reflects that structure, were also able to improvise and add to the dialogue, making it their own. Broomfield based the film on his own research and a 6,000-page document on the massacre written by the US Naval Criminal Investigation Service. He also cited The Battle of Algiers as an influence. The 22 year-old Elliot Ruiz, who plays Ramirez, was a real life marine who was, at the time of the film's release, the youngest US serviceman deployed to Iraq at age 17.

The names of the Marines were changed for the film, while the Iraqi civilians retain their real names.

== Film festivals ==
Battle for Haditha was presented at the Toronto Film Festival on 11 September 2007. Director Nick Broomfield won the Silver Shell award for Best Director at the San Sebastian Film Festival on 29 September 2007. It was also presented at the London Film Festival on 30 October 2007.

Following the release of the film, the US military controversially dropped all charges to all Marines involved.

== Critical reception ==
On the review aggregator website Rotten Tomatoes, 70% of 33 critics' reviews are positive, with an average rating of 6.2/10. The website's consensus reads: "This narrative retelling of the real life tragedy in Haditha is gripping and immediate but may sacrifice the subtleties of history for dramatic impact." Metacritic, which uses a weighted average, assigned the film a score of 65 out of 100, based on 12 critics, indicating "generally favorable" reviews.

== See also ==
- Cinema of Jordan
