= Juvenile Liaison =

1976 British film by Nick Broomfield

- Directed by: Nick Broomfield
- Produced by: Nick Broomfield; Joan Churchill
- Narrated by: Nick Broomfield
- Production company: Lafayette Films
- Distributed by: Channel 4 (UK) (TV); British Film Institute
- Release dates: 1976 (Juvenile Liaison 1); 1990 (Juvenile Liaison 2)
- Country: United Kingdom

Juvenile Liaison is a series of two documentary films by award winning film director Nick Broomfield and his wife Joan Churchill about a juvenile liaison project in Blackburn, Lancashire, England. The first film examines a series of pre-teen children and their run-ins with the law, over minor wrongdoings such as theft, truancy, and short-term bullying. The second film revisits some of the residents from the first, in an attempt to measure the success of the scheme.

The original film was funded by the British Film Institute, who controlled its distribution. When the subject matter became known, Lancashire Constabulary, the police force featured, put pressure on the families of the participants to withdraw their consent, and after taking legal advice, the BFI would not allow the film to be shown publicly until 1990. This led some commentators to call Juvenile Liaison 1 "The Film the Police Arrested".

Juvenile Liaison 1 revolved mainly around the activities of Sergeant George Ray; one of the force's most accomplished liaison officers, whose preventive measures when dealing with young troublemakers fell mainly in the strong-arm category of approach. In Juvenile Liaison 2, Ray was contacted by phone but declined to appear, hinting at misrepresentation and possible damage to his career. Broomfield and Churchill later discovered that Sergeant Ray was officially cleared in the internal police inquiry following the original film's production. He resigned soon afterwards, following disagreement with his superiors over the force's corrective and investigative measures for dealing with minor youth crime. The juvenile liaison scheme was still in practice in Blackburn by the time the second film was released in 1990, although it had recently changed its name to Juvenile Bureau.

== See also ==
- Criminalization
- Youth rights
