= Pascal Esho Warda =

Assyrian politician and former Minister of Immigration and Refugees in Iraq

- ܦܣܟܠ ܐܝܫܘ ܘܪܕܐ باسكال وردا
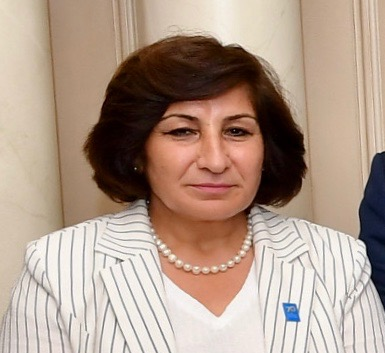
- Warda in 2019

Minister of Immigration and Refugees
- In office 28 June 2004 – 3 May 2005
- Prime Minister: Ayad Allawi

Personal details
- Born: 1961 (age 64–65) Nohadra, Iraq
- Party: Independent
- Education: University of Lyon
- Profession: Human rights lawyer Politician

Pascal Esho Warda (Syriac: ܦܣܟܠ ܐܝܫܘ ܘܪܕܐ) is an Assyrian politician and human rights lawyer who was previously the Minister of Immigration and Refugees in the Iraqi Interim Government under then Prime Minister Ayad Allawi.

== Early life ==
Warda was born in 1961 in the city of Nohadra to a Chaldean Catholic family. She later was exiled to France, where she attended the University of Lyon and received her Master's degree in Human rights studies. While in France, she became the representative of the Assyrian Democratic Movement's French branch.

== Career ==
Warda would later direct ADM's communications in Damascus, Syria before returning to Iraq in 2001. She would serve as head of the Assyrian Women's Union in Baghdad and on the Board of Directors of the Assyrian Aid Society.

From 2004 to 2005, Warda served as Minister of Immigration and Refugees in the Iraqi Interim Government that replaced the rule of the Coalition Provisional Authority following the US Invasion in 2003. As minister, Warda voiced support for the execution of former Iraqi dictator Saddam Hussein and was not only one of six women on the 32 member Iraqi Council of Ministers, but the only Chaldean-Assyrian. During her time as minister, she was invited by the First Lady of the United States, Laura Bush, for a discussion on global women's issues at the G8 Summit in Sea Island, Georgia. In 2011, Warda spoke on behalf of Internally displaced persons in Iraq, criticizing the Iraqi government for inadequate steps to guarantee their resettlement.

Warda has also had a long history in human rights organizations specializing in women and minority rights in Iraq. In 2005, Warda and her husband, journalist William Warda, led in the founding of the Hammurabi Human Rights Organization, a non-profit group that monitors and opposes human rights violations against members of Iraq's minority groups. In 2006, she cooperated with the Chaldo-Assyrian Student and Youth Union to stage a protest against Mosul University due to their inaction preventing Islamists from causing a hijab intimidation crisis. She also attended a women's rights conference in India. Since 2015, she and her husband have worked with the Alliance of Iraqi Minorities, a coalition of civil society groups working to forge better cooperation among Iraq's disparate, and often divided, minority communities—including Christians (Assyrians/Armenians), Shabaks, Mandaeans, Yarsanis (Kaka'is), Baha'is, Faili Kurds and Yazidis.

In 2019, the U.S. State Department awarded Pascal and William Warda one of its inaugural International Religious Freedom Awards. In 2023, she was selected as an advisory council member for the International Women's Peace Group.

== Personal life ==
Pascal has recounted several attempts made on her life by armed assailants during the course of her work in Iraq. Speaking with National Catholic Register in Budapest, she explained how faith had gotten her through these attempts on her life and that she was proud of the work she was doing.

Pascal, alongside her husband William Warda, have two daughters named Shlama and Neshma. They both continue to reside over the Hammurabi Human Rights Organization.
