= Leeds Animation Workshop =

Women's animation collective in Leeds, England

- Industry: Film
- Founded: 1978
- Headquarters: Harehills, Leeds
- Number of locations: 1
- Website: leedsanimation.org.uk

Leeds Animation Workshop is a women's collective who have produced and distributed animated films on social issues since 1978.

== Background ==
Based in Leeds in the north of England, Leeds Animation Workshop (LAW) describes itself as a "not-for-profit, cooperative company, which produces and distributes animated films and films on social and educational issues." They have produced over 40 animated films. The short animated films have covered a range of social and educational issues including "equal pay, racism, domestic abuse, homophobia, child protection, nuclear disarmament, parenting and the environmental crisis."

== History ==
The founding members of Leeds Animation Workshop were previously members of the Leeds Nursery Film Group, which had instigated the production of the film Who Needs Nurseries? - We Do, which was subsequently produced by LAW and debuted in 1978. The group had begun work on the film in late 1976. The film expressed a need for pre-school childcare. LAW was inspired by the Women's Liberation Movement. In 1982, they used a grant award from the British Film Institute to purchase a house in Harehills. This grant consisted of £7000 through the Housing the Cinema Fund. An additional grant from Channel 4 for equipment in the mid-1980s meant that LAW could control its own productions.

== Works ==
LAW works as a collective. It was a member of the National Organisation of Film Workshops. Leeds Animation Workshop has historically completed all production work in Leeds. They feature local accents, vocabulary and architecture in their films. It began production using a traditional technique, transferring visual content from paper, to cel, to rostrum camera. It later transitioned from shooting on 16mm film to a digital camera. In some films, the Workshop employs a mixed-media approach, using "live-action footage or stop-motion animation in addition to 2D hand-drawn animation".

One of the most widely discussed films produced by the collective was Give Us A Smile (1983) which is about women's experiences of street harassment and sexist media imagery, and was made in the years after the Yorkshire Ripper murders in the city and nearby Bradford. This film used excerpts from the police reports, including the phrase "Did you smile at him first", which moved between live action of police officers and animation, and critiques sexist responses to violence against women prevalent at the time. Alan Bennett also narrated four films for the workshop, which used a fairy tale format to explore sexism and science, including Did I Say Hairdressing? I Meant Astrophysics (1998).

During the COVID-19 pandemic the workshop continued its work, utilising social media and micro-blogging to continue to engage with its communities. According to researcher Rosanna Maule, during this period LAW's social media focussed on "messages for social action, prompting for concrete acts of solidarity towards under-represented and vulnerable subjects and communities". LAW's first pandemic-related films was Locked Down in West Leeds (2021) which was made in partnership with eight participants from Bramley Elderly Action.

== Legacy ==
The archive is held by the University of Leeds. It includes administrative, audio visual, production and publicity materials. An exhibition was held at the Treasures of the Brotherton Gallery in 2025.

In 2026, Leeds Civic Trust announced their decision to install a blue plaque in recognition of Leeds Animation Workshop.
