= Thaer Thabet =

Iraqi activist

Thaer Thabet al-Hadithi is an Iraqi activist. A native of Haditha and founder of the Hammurabi Organization for Human Rights and Democracy. The day after a squad of US Marines killed 24 Iraqi civilians after an improvised explosive device detonated by insurgents killed American soldier Miguel Terrazas, Thabet, who claimed to live around 100 yards (100 m) away from the original IED blast in Haditha, videotaped the scene the day after the carnage. He then shared his tape four months later with Time magazine, Viewing the tape prompted them to run a story on the incident after McGirk found obvious discrepancies with the military's November press release about the IED and the injuries revealed by the tape, which obviously were not caused by shrapnel.

Time's McGirk, who now is the bureau chief in Jerusalem, declined to testify for the defense at the Marines' article 32 hearing. He was not an eyewitness to the attacks; his interviews have been published and are already in the public domain.
