= Nick Broomfield =

British documentary film director (born 1948)

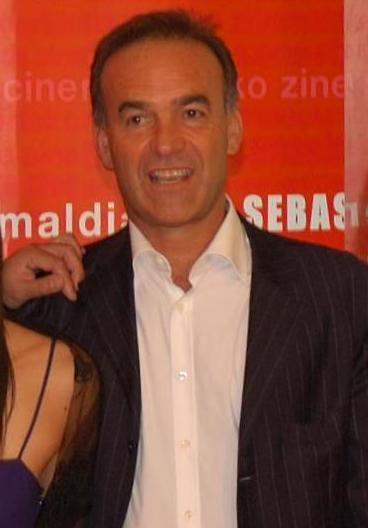
- Broomfield in 2005
- Born: 1948 (age 77–78); London, England
- Education: Sidcot School, Somerset; Cardiff University; University of Essex; National Film and Television School
- Occupation: Film director
- Children: 2
- Parent(s): Maurice Broomfield; Sonja Lagusova
- Website: nickbroomfield.com

Nicholas Broomfield (born 1948) is an English documentary film director. His self-reflective style has been regarded as influential to many later filmmakers. In the early 21st century, he began to use non-actors in scripted works, which he calls "Direct Cinema". His output ranges from studies of entertainers to political works such as examinations of South Africa before and after the end of apartheid and the rise of the black-majority government of Nelson Mandela and the African National Congress party.

Broomfield generally works with a minimal crew, recording sound himself and using one or two camera operators. He is often seen in the finished film, usually holding the sound boom and wearing the Nagra tape recorder.

== Early life and education ==
Nicholas Broomfield was born in 1948. He is the son of photographer Maurice Broomfield (1916–2010) and Sonja Lagusova (1922–1982). His mother was Jewish.

From 1959 to 1965, Broomfield was educated at Sidcot School, a Quaker boarding independent school for boys (now co-educational), near the village of Winscombe in Somerset in south west England. He gained higher-level education at University College Cardiff (which became Cardiff University in 1999), where he studied law, and the University of Essex, where he studied political science. Subsequently, he studied film at the National Film and Television School in London. Broomfield's early style was conventional cinéma vérité: the juxtaposition of observed scenes, with little use of voice-over or text. His early influences were Frederick Wiseman and D. A. Pennebaker.

In 1963 he had a long conversation with Rolling Stone Brian Jones on a train journey. 60 years later Broomfield would make a documentary about Jones.

== Career in documentaries ==
After more than a decade of working as a filmmaker, Broomfield altered his film style, appearing on-screen for the first time in Chicken Ranch (1983). After several arguments regarding the budget and nature of the film, he decided that he would make the documentary only if he could experiment by filming the very process of making the film—the arguments, the failed interviews and the dead-ends.

This shift in film-making style was strongly influenced by Broomfield's struggles in trying to gain distribution for his earlier documentary, Lily Tomlin, which chronicled the American comedian's one-woman show The Search for Signs of Intelligent Life in the Universe. Tomlin claimed the film was a spoiler for her show and filed suit for $7 million in damages. The documentary was shown on public television but not widely released. Eventually Broomfield's documentary was incorporated into the video release of the one-woman show.

Broomfield became known for this self-reflective film-making style: making films that were also about the making itself as well as the ostensible subject. His influence on documentary could be seen in the work of younger filmmakers of the first decade of the 21st century: according to The Guardian, Michael Moore, Louis Theroux and Morgan Spurlock each demonstrated similar styles in their recent box-office hits. Such filmmakers have been classified as Les Nouvelles Egotistes; others have likened Broomfield's work to the Gonzo journalism of American Hunter S. Thompson.

Kurt & Courtney, about American musicians Kurt Cobain and Courtney Love, was selected for the 1998 Sundance Film Festival. Its screening was cancelled by the festival after Love threatened to sue, as the film was released after Cobain's death. A previous film, Soldier Girls, which Broomfield co-directed with Joan Churchill, won first prize at the BAFTA Film Awards a few years previously.

=== Direct Cinema ===
In 2006, Broomfield changed his style again, adopting techniques of what he calls 'Direct Cinema': using non-actors to play themselves in dramas with a screenplay. He completed a drama called Ghosts for Channel 4; this was inspired by the 2004 Morecambe Bay cockling disaster, when 23 Chinese immigrant cockle pickers drowned after being cut off by the tides. Ghosts won an award and helped raise nearly £500,000 to help the victims' families.

In Battle for Haditha (2007), Broomfield worked with ex-Marines and Iraqi refugees, as well as known actors. The film was shot sequentially, enabling the cast to build their characters as the story progressed. It also used real locations, and a very small documentary-style film crew. Although working from a detailed script, Broomfield allowed the actors to improvise and add dialogue. Broomfield based his script on research with the Marines of Kilo Company who took part in the fighting on that day, the survivors of the massacre, and the six-thousand page NCIS government report. Battle for Haditha won two international awards.

== Withdrawn films ==
In the mid-1970s, he made a film about pre-teen children and their run-ins with the law, which focused on the work of a Blackburn police officer assigned to "juvenile liaison". Released under the title Juvenile Liaison in 1976, the film was withdrawn from circulation by the BFI executive which funded it.

Broomfield explains in Juvenile Liaison 2, shot fifteen years after the original, that many of the original film's participants withdrew their consent following an early screening. In interviews, some of the original participants claimed to have been persuaded to withdraw their consent by Blackburn police. This lack of consent resulted in the BFI (the film's financial backers) withdrawing the film from circulation. Both films have been widely available since at least 1990, including via mainstream streaming services. The BFI production board who originally voted to finance the film, all resigned in disgust at the BFI executive taking the decision to effectively ban the film except for screenings for specialized groups, such as social workers.

Broomfield (and Joan Churchill)'s next film, Tattooed Tears, was shot in California in 1978. It won the California State Bar Award among other awards for promoting justice. Broomfield and Churchill continued the struggle to get Juvenile Liaison released, which is why they made Juvenile Liaison II in 1990.

== Commercials ==
In 1999, Broomfield made a series of five commercials for Volkswagen. Each of these featured Broomfield with his trademark sound boom "investigating" rumours about the soon-to-be released Volkswagen Passat.

== Personal life ==
He has two sons: Barney and Charlie Broomfield.

Broomfield told the BBC that he professes irreligion. He said, "I believe that there's a goodness out there, and I think there's goodness in everybody. We should probably all try and have a good dig around and find out where it is."

== Awards ==
- British Academy Award (BAFTA)
- Prix Italia
- The Dupont Columbia Award for Outstanding Journalism
- The Peabody
- The Royal Television Society Award
- First Prize, Sundance Film Festival
- John Grierson Award
- Robert Flaherty Award
- The Hague Peace Prize
- The Chris Award
- The Blue Ribbon
- The California State Bar Award
- First Prize, Chicago Film Festival
- First Prize, US Film Festival
- First Prize, Festival of Mannheim
- First Prize, Festival di Popoli
- Special Jury Award, Melbourne Film Festival
- Inspiration Award, Sheffield Doc/Fest (2011)

== Filmography ==
- Who Cares? (1971) – Broomfield's first film, made as a student using a borrowed camera.
- Proud to be British (1973)
- England and Class (1973)
- Behind the Rent Strike (1974) – A documentary about the rent strike in Kirkby, Liverpool.
- Juvenile Liaison (1976)
- Gosling's Travels: Whittingham (1975)
- Gosling's Travels: Fort Augustus (1976)
- Soldier Girls (1981)
- Tattooed Tears (1982)
- Chicken Ranch (1983)
- Lily Tomlin (1986)
- Driving Me Crazy (1988)
- Diamond Skulls (1989) also known as Dark Obsession
- Juvenile Liaison II (1990)
- The Leader, His Driver and the Driver's Wife (1991)
- Too White For Me (1992)
- Aileen Wuornos: The Selling of a Serial Killer (1992)
- Monster in a Box (1992)
- Tracking Down Maggie (1994)
- Heidi Fleiss: Hollywood Madam (1995)
- Fetishes (1996)
- Kurt & Courtney (1998)
- Biggie & Tupac (2002)
- Aileen: Life and Death of a Serial Killer (2003)
- His Big White Self (2006)
- Ghosts (2006)
- Battle for Haditha (2007)
- A Time Comes (2009)
- Sarah Palin: You Betcha! (2011)
- Sex: My British Job (2013)
- Tales of the Grim Sleeper (2014)
- Going Going Gone (2016)
- Whitney: Can I Be Me (2017)
- Marianne & Leonard: Words of Love (2019)
- My Father and Me (2019)
- Last Man Standing: Suge Knight and the Murders of Biggie and Tupac (2021)
- The Stones and Brian Jones (2023)
