= Human rights in Iraq =

Human rights in Iraq are addressed in the following articles:

- Human rights in pre-Saddam Iraq
- Human rights in Ba'athist Iraq
- Human rights in post-invasion Iraq
- Human rights in Iraqi Kurdistan
- Human rights in ISIL-controlled territory
- Human rights in Islamic countries
