= Censorship in Iraq =

Censorship in Iraq has changed under different regimes, most recently due to the 2003 invasion of Iraq.

== Since 2003 ==
=== The penal code and censorship ===
The penal code of Iraq does have some provisions that do address the issue of censorship. In 2003, the Iraqi penal code was reverted to its 1988 edition with some revisions drafted by Paul Bremer and later the Iraqi national government. Several provisions in the current penal code address the limitations placed on the freedom of the press and communicative media, namely;

Paragraph 215 – Any person who produces, imports, exports or obtains a picture, written material or sign with intent to trade, distribute, display or exhibit such material, which, by its nature, endangers the public security or brings the country into disrepute unless he was acting in good faith is punishable by detention plus a fine not exceeding 300 dinars or by one of those penalties.

Paragraph 220 – If five or more people are assembled in a public place, thereby endangering the public security and the public authorities order them to disperse, any person who is given that order and refuses to comply with it is punishable by a period of detention not exceeding 1 year plus a fine not exceeding 100 dinars or by one of those penalties.

Paragraph 403 – Any person who produces, imports, publishes, possesses, obtains or translates a book, printed or other written material, drawing, picture, film, symbol or other thing that violates the public integrity or decency with intent to exploit or distribute such material is punishable by a period of detention not exceeding 2 years plus a fine not exceeding 200 dinars or by one of those penalties. The same penalty applies to any person who advertises such material or displays it in public or sells, hires or offers it for sale or hire even though it is not in public or to any person who distributes or submits it for distribution by any means. If the offense is committed with intent to deprave, it is considered to be an aggravating circumstances.b

Paragraph 404 – Any person who himself or through some mechanical means sings or broadcasts in a public place obscene or indecent songs or statements is punishable by a period of detention not exceeding 1 year or by a fine not exceeding 100 dinars.

Paragraph 434 – Insult is the imputation to another of something dishonourable or disrespectful or the hurting of his feelings even though it does not include an imputation to him of a particular matter. Any person who insults another is punishable by a period of detention not exceeding 1 year plus a fine not exceeding 100 dinars or by one of those penalties. If such insult Is published in a newspaper or publication or medium it is considered an aggravating circumstance.

Paragraph 438 – The following persons are punishable by a period of detention not exceeding 1 year plus a fine not exceeding 100 dinars or by one of those penalties: (1) Any person who publishes in any way a picture, remark or information in respect of the private or family life of another, even though such information is true and such publication causes him offense. (2) Any person other than those mentioned in Paragraph 328 who is privy to information contained in a letter, telex or telephone conversation and he discloses such information to a person other than for whom it is intended and such disclosure causes harm to another.

=== The Constitution and censorship ===
In 2005, a new Constitution was ratified by Iraqi voters, which have implications for Constitutional rights and censorship in Iraq. Among the civil liberties guaranteed in the Constitution include;

Section 1. Article 7 - No entity or program, under any name, may adopt racism, terrorism, the calling of others infidels, ethnic cleansing, or incite, facilitate, glorify, promote, or justify thereto, especially the Saddamist Baath in Iraq and its symbols, regardless of the name that it adopts. This may not be part of the political pluralism in Iraq. This will be organized by law.

Section 2. Article 36 - The state guarantees in a way that does not violate public order and morality: a. Freedom of expression, through all means. b. Freedom of press, printing, advertisement, media and publication. c. Freedom of assembly and peaceful demonstration. This shall be regulated by law.

Section 2. Article 38 - The State shall guarantee in a way that does not violate public order and morality: First. Freedom of expression using all means. Second. Freedom of press, printing, advertisement, media and publication. Third. Freedom of assembly and peaceful demonstration, and this shall be regulated by law.

Section 2. Article 40 - The freedom of communication, and mail, telegraphic, electronic, and telephonic correspondence, and other correspondence shall be guaranteed and may not be monitored, wiretapped or disclosed except for legal and security necessity and by a judicial decision.

== Internet censorship ==
Only 17.6% of Iraq's population had access to the Internet at the end of 2013.

The ONI found no evidence of filtering from Iraq in August 2009 in all 4 areas for those which the government tests political filtering, social filtering, conflict/security, and monitoring of Internet tools.

Iraq's constitution provides for the rights of freedom of speech and press, and the government respects these rights in practice. There are no overt government restrictions that the government monitor Internet chat rooms or e-mail.

Those freedoms are provided so long that it doesn't violate public order and morality or express support for the banned Baath Party or for altering the country's borders by violent means.

== Censorship in Iraq: 1979 - 2003 ==
Saddam Hussein ruled Iraq as a single-party state from 1979 - 2003, with the Ba'athist Party and the National Progressive Front maintaining mostly majority in parliamentary elections, with only a select few independents achieving seats. During this era, political criticism which undermined the Ba'ath party was illegal, with most criticism for the party coming from internal channels, rather than general public. Similar restrictions against political expression were found in the Iraqi Constitution.

The only source of political representation in Iraq during Saddam's regime was in the Iraqi Parliament with people able to vote either for the collation led by the Ba'ath Party, or to vote for independents, but non-parliamentary elections were mostly mock elections with no opposition.

The Iraqi National government was (in accordance with Article 37 of the Constitution of 1990) limited to the membership of the Revolutionary Command Council. Among other powers, this council had (Article 36) the right to prohibit anything that they felt harmed "national unity", the "objectives of the People" or their "achievements".

== Censorship in Iraq during the 1950s - 1979 ==
In the late 1950s to late 1970s, several different political factions fought for control of the Iraqi government. Initially, a series of military leaders ruled Iraq from 1958 to 1968. After, which the Iraqi Baathist Party seized control and was led by a series of party leaders until Saddam Hussein came to power in 1979. None of these different governments showed much support for the freedom of speech, press, personal expression and other forms of communications because of Saddam's strict rule.

== Censorship in the Kingdom of Iraq ==
The Constitution governing the Kingdom of Iraq (1932 - 1958) pledged to respect several civil liberties, specifically:

Article 12 - "Freedom of expression of opinion, liberty of publication, of meeting together, and of forming and joining associations" ... in accordance with whatever laws were enacted by the national government.

Article 13 - "Islam is the official religion of the State. Freedom to practise the rites; of the different sects of that religion, as observed in Iraq, is guaranteed. Complete freedom of conscience and freedom to practise the various forms of worship, in conformity with accepted customs, is guaranteed to all inhabitants of the country provided that such forms of worship do not conflict with the maintenance of order and discipline or public morality."

Article 15 - "Art. 15. All postal and telegraphic correspondence and all telephonic communications shall be secret and free from censorship or detention, except in such circumstances and in such manner as may be prescribed by law."

== See also ==
- Human rights in post-invasion Iraq
- Human rights in Saddam Hussein's Iraq
- Human rights in pre-Saddam Iraq
- Internet censorship and surveillance in Iraq
