= Human rights in post-invasion Iraq =

Human rights in post-invasion Iraq have been a subject of concern and controversy since the 2003 U.S. invasion. Issues have been raised regarding the conduct of insurgents, U.S.-led coalition forces, and the Iraqi government. The United States is investigating several allegations of violations of international and domestic standards of conduct in isolated incidents involving its forces and contractors. Similarly, the United Kingdom is conducting investigations into alleged human rights abuses by its forces. War crime tribunals and criminal prosecutions for numerous crimes committed by insurgents are likely still years away. In late February 2009, the U.S. State Department released a report on the human rights situation in Iraq, reflecting on developments during the previous year (2008).

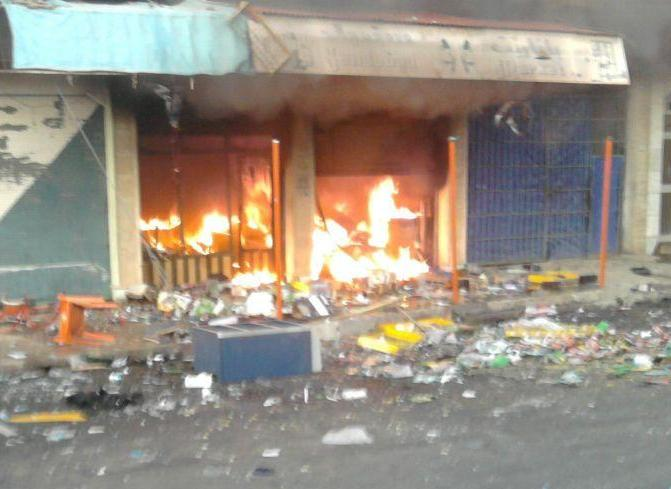
Shops in Zakho after the 2011 Dohuk riots

== Human rights abuses by insurgents ==
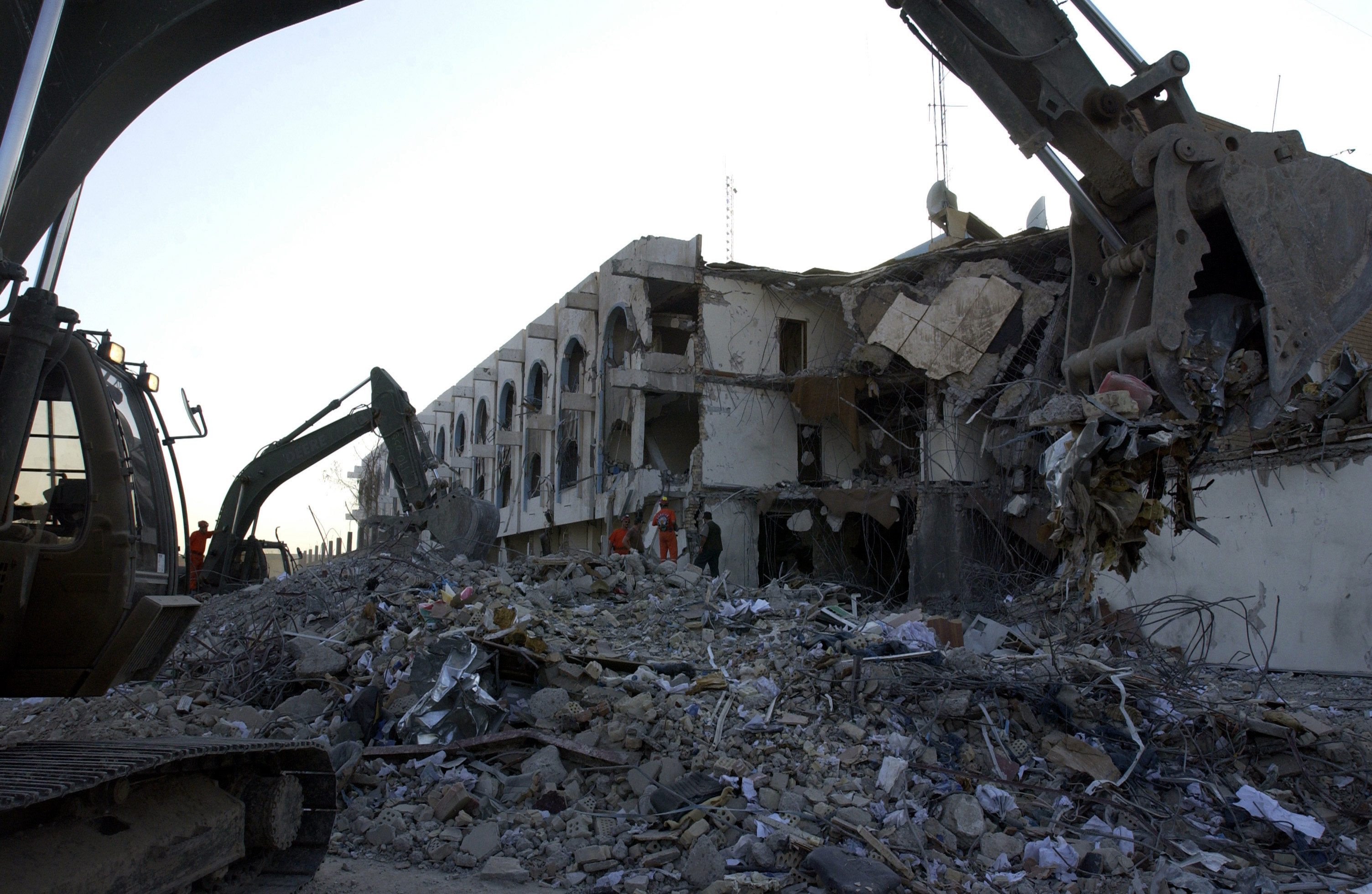
The UN headquarters building in Baghdad after the Canal Hotel bombing, on 22 August 2003

Human rights abuses carried out or alleged to have been carried out by Iraq-based insurgents and/or terrorists include:

=== August 2003 ===
The bombing of the U.N. headquarters in Baghdad in August 2003 resulted in the death of the top U.N. representative in Iraq, 55-year-old Sérgio Vieira de Mello, a Brazilian diplomat who also served as the UN High Commissioner for Human Rights. The attack claimed the lives of 22 U.N. staff members and injured more than 100 others. Among the dead was Nadia Younes, a former Executive Director at the World Health Organization (WHO) in charge of External Relations and Governing Bodies. The terrorist attack was strongly condemned by U.N. Secretary-General Kofi Annan and denounced by the U.N. Security Council.

=== June 2004 ===
South Korean translator Kim Sun-il was beheaded by followers of Abu Musab al-Zarqawi.

=== July 2004 ===
Tawhid and Jihad killed Bulgarian truck drivers Ivaylo Kepov and Georgi Lazov. Al-Jazeera aired a videotape of the incident but stated that the segment showing the actual killings was too graphic to broadcast.

=== December 2004 ===
Salvatore Santoro, a 52-year-old Italian photographer, was beheaded in a video. The Islamic Movement of Iraqi Mujahedeen claimed responsibility for the act.

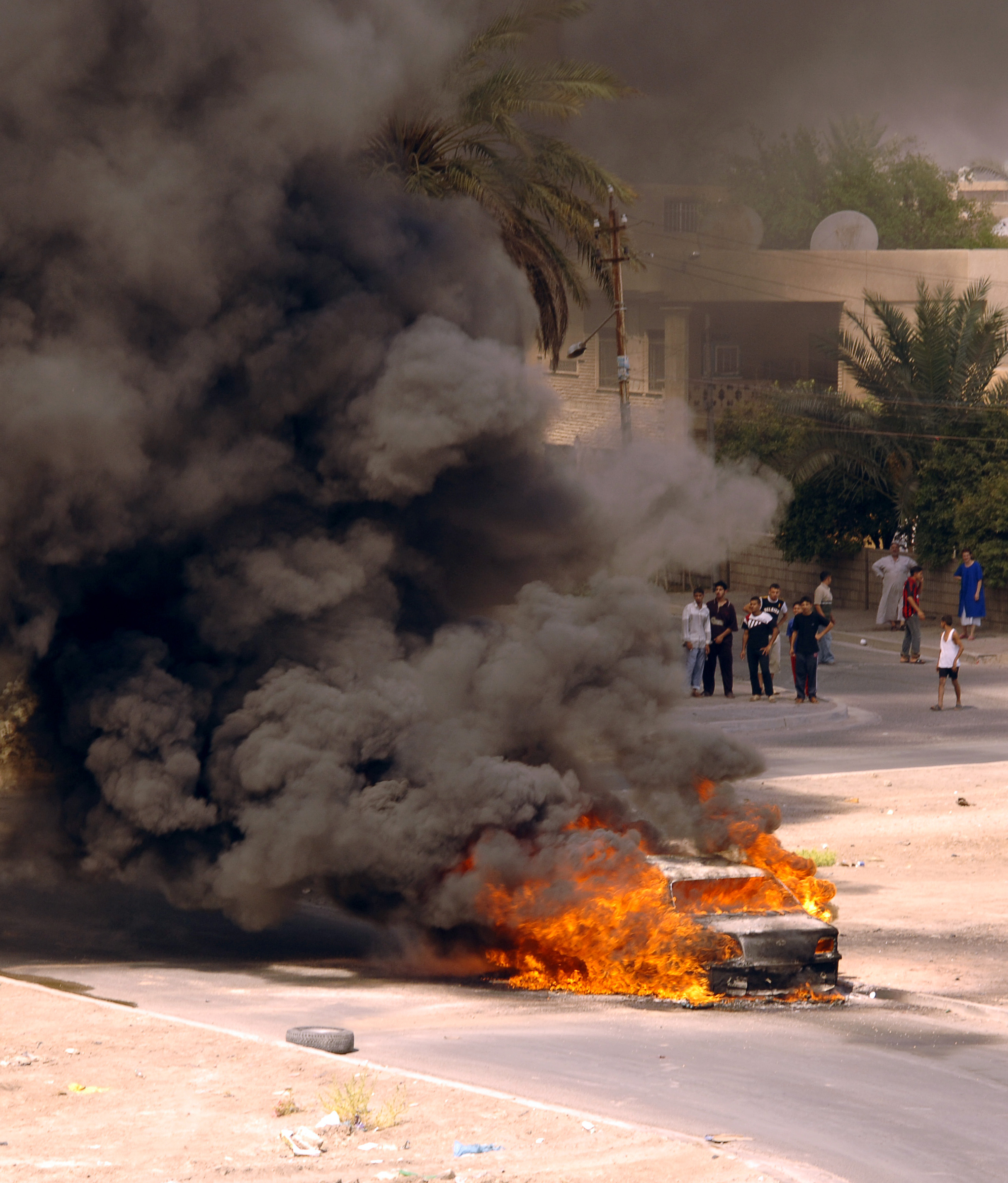
An Iraqi vehicle burns in Baghdad after being hit by a mortar that was fired by insurgents, 8 August 2006

=== February 2005 ===
Al-Iraqiya TV (Iraq) aired transcripts of confessions by Syrian intelligence officer Anas Ahmad Al-Issa and Iraqi terrorist Shihab Al-Sab'awi. The confessions detailed their involvement in booby-trap operations, explosions, kidnappings, assassinations, and training for beheadings in Syria.

=== July 2005 ===
Egyptian and Algerian envoys.

- Two Algerian diplomats, Ali Belaroussi and Azzedine Belkadi, were reported to have been killed by al-Qaeda in Iraq. The group issued a statement online claiming responsibility, stating: “The court of al-Qaeda in Iraq has decided to carry out God’s verdict against the two diplomats from the apostate Algerian government ... and ordered to kill them.” The statement was signed by Abu Maysara al-Iraqi, the al-Qaeda spokesman.
- An Egyptian diplomat, Al-Sherif, was reported to have been killed by al-Qaeda in Iraq. The group posted a statement on a web forum claiming responsibility for the killing. Top Sunni cleric Mohamed Sayed Tantawi condemned the act, describing it as "a crime against religion, morality, and humanity, as well as a crime that goes against honor and chivalry."

=== February 2006 ===
The Al Askari Mosque bombing took place on February 22, 2006, at approximately 6:55 am local time (0355 UTC) at the Al Askari Mosque, one of the holiest sites in Shi'a Islam, in the Iraqi city of Samarra, about 100 km (62 mi) northwest of Baghdad. Although no injuries were reported from the blast itself, the bombing led to violence in the following days. On February 23, over 100 dead bodies with bullet holes were found, and at least 165 people are believed to have been killed.

=== June 2006 ===
A video showing the killing of four Russian diplomats kidnapped in Iraq was posted on the Internet. The group called the Mujahideen Shura Council released the hostage video.

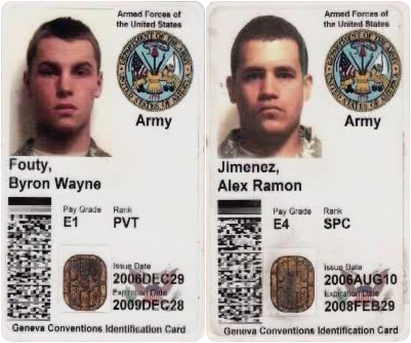
The Islamic State of Iraq captured and subsequently murdered three U.S. soldiers in May 2007

=== July 2006 ===
Anba' Al-Iraq News Agency and the Writers Without Borders Organization condemned the imprisonment of its staff member, Husain E. Khadir, who was responsible for covering documentaries about the threats posed by the Kurdistan Federal Region to its neighboring countries. A delegation from Human Rights Watch (HRW) released reports on torture in Iraq, as well as the repression of human rights and freedom of expression. HRW interviewed several detained writers and journalists to document these violations. Mr. Khadir was first detained in Kirkuk and later moved to Erbil, where HRW visited him in one of the detention centers.

The previous year in Baghdad, Khadir faced even worse conditions when he escaped from a Shi'a militia that had seized his house and thrown his family into the streets, an act seen as a serious threat to his life. Such actions are commonly directed at human rights activists, journalists, and writers who criticize the Iraqi government and the Shi'a coalition party. During the constitution-writing process, several press and media agencies strongly criticized the Iraqi Shi'a Coalition. Khadir led a campaign to amend the constitution, advocating for a document that would serve as a peace-building tool, bringing all parties together for national consensus and social cohesion, rather than merely serving as a state-building instrument, as the ruling party frequently stated.

UNAMI commented that most of these civil society activities were supported by UN agencies, international donors, or the U.S. and British governments. The IRIN/UN news agency revealed that journalists and writers are among the most vulnerable victims of killing, threats, kidnapping, torture, and detention, practices commonly carried out by uncontrolled Iraqi forces, paramilitary organizations, and Shi'a or Sunni militias. This situation, similar to Khadir's case, is spreading across southern, central, and northern Iraq.

The number of journalists and writers killed in Iraq has exceeded 220 this year, according to the Iraqi Organization for Supporting Journalists, as reported to IRIN.

U.S. National Guard Sergeant Frank "Greg" Ford claimed to have witnessed human rights violations in Samarra, Iraq. However, a subsequent Army investigation found Ford's allegations to be unfounded. Additionally, Ford was discovered to have worn unauthorized "U.S. Navy SEAL" insignia on his Army uniform, despite having never been a Navy SEAL, a claim he had made for many years while serving in the Army National Guard.

- The Kuwaiti News Agency reported that a high-ranking Iraqi security source in the Interior Ministry confirmed the final death toll of the 13 August bombings in the Al-Zafaraniyah district in southern Baghdad was 57 killed and 145 injured, most of them women and children. Iraqi Prime Minister Nuri al-Maliki blamed Sunni extremists for seeking to escalate the conflict.

== Human rights abuses by coalition forces ==
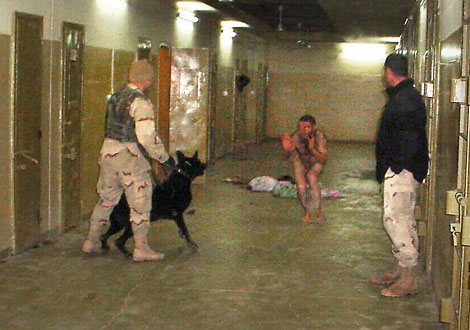
Abu Ghraib torture and prisoner abuse

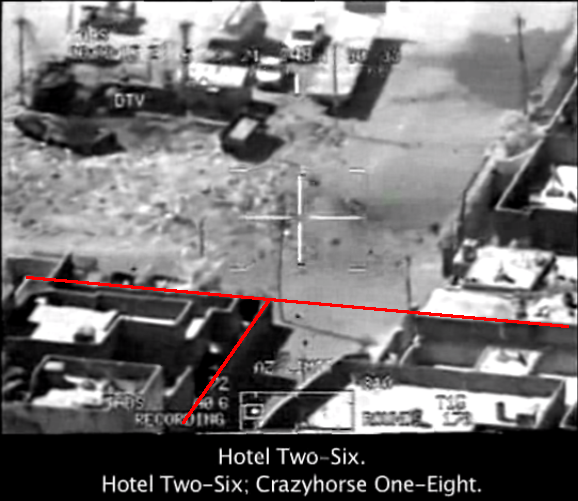
Gun camera footage of the airstrike of 12 July 2007 in Baghdad, showing the slaying of Namir Noor-Eldeen and a dozen other civilians by a US helicopter.

=== April 2003 ===
On April 29, 2003, an Iraqi man, Ather Karen al-Mowafakia, was shot and killed by a British soldier at a roadside checkpoint. Witnesses alleged that he was shot in the abdomen after the door of his car struck a soldier's leg as he was getting out of the vehicle. They further claimed he was then dragged from the car and beaten by the soldier's comrades, later succumbing to his injuries in the hospital. Despite seven attempts by The Guardian to address the incident, the UK Ministry of Defence (MOD) has refused to explain why the individuals were detained or provide details on where, how, or why they died.

=== May 2003 ===
In May 2003, Saeed Shabram and his cousin, Menem Akaili, were detained by British troops and thrown into a river near Basra. Akaili survived, but Shabram drowned. According to Akaili, the two were approached by a British patrol, led at gunpoint to a jetty, and forced into the water. The act, referred to as "wetting," was reportedly used to humiliate local youths suspected of looting.

"Wetting was supposed to humiliate those suspected of being petty criminals," said Sapna Malik, the family's lawyer from Leigh Day and Co. "Although the Ministry of Defence (MOD) denies the existence of a policy of wetting to deal with suspected looters at the time, evidence we have seen suggests otherwise. The tactics employed by the MOD appeared to include throwing or placing suspected looters into either of Basra's two main waterways."

Iraqi bystanders rescued Akaili, but Shabram disappeared. His body was later recovered by a diver hired by his father, Radhi Shabram, after a four-hour search while his mother waited on the riverbank. "When Saeed's corpse was finally pulled from the river, Radhi described it as bloated and covered with marks and bruises," Malik added.

Although the MOD paid compensation to Shabram's family, none of the soldiers involved were charged in connection with his death.

Ahmed Jabbar Kareem Ali, a 15-year-old boy, was on his way to work with his brother on May 8, 2003, when he was assaulted by a group of British soldiers. The soldiers beat him and then forced him into a canal at gunpoint to "teach him a lesson" for suspected looting. Weakened from the beating, Ali struggled in the water and drowned. His lifeless body was later pulled from the canal.

In a separate case involving the death of another Iraqi teenager, four British soldiers were acquitted of manslaughter.

=== August 2003 ===
Hanan Saleh Matrud, an eight-year-old Iraqi girl, was killed on August 21, 2003, by a soldier from the King's Regiment when a Warrior armoured vehicle stopped near an alley leading to her home. Three or four soldiers exited the vehicle, attracting a group of children, including Hanan. Accounts of what happened next differ.

The soldiers claimed they came under attack from a mob throwing stones, prompting a "warning shot" to be fired. However, local witnesses alleged that the crowd consisted only of children, who had been "coaxed into the open by the soldiers' offers of chocolate." Hanan was shot in the lower torso and rushed by the soldiers to a Czech-run hospital, where she died the following day after an unsuccessful operation.

According to the Ministry of Defence (MOD), "in the absence of impartial witness evidence or forensic evidence to suggest a soldier had acted outside the rules of engagement, no crime was established." In May 2004, following an intervention by Amnesty International, Hanan's family submitted a formal claim for proper compensation, which was under assessment by the MOD as of that time.

=== September 2003 ===
On September 14, Baha Mousa, a 26-year-old hotel receptionist, was arrested along with six other men and taken to a British military base. While in detention, Mousa and the other captives were hooded, severely beaten, and assaulted by several soldiers at the base. Two days later, Mousa was found dead.

A post-mortem examination revealed that Mousa had sustained multiple injuries—at least 93—including fractured ribs and a broken nose, which were identified as contributing factors to his death.

Seven members of the Queen's Lancashire Regiment were tried on charges related to the ill-treatment of detainees, including war crimes under the International Criminal Court Act 2001. On September 19, 2006, Corporal Donald Payne pleaded guilty to a charge of inhumane treatment of persons, making him the first member of the British Armed Forces to plead guilty to a war crime. He was subsequently sentenced to one year in prison and expelled from the army.

The BBC reported that the six other soldiers were cleared of any wrongdoing. The Independent stated that the charges against them had been dropped, with the presiding judge, Justice Ronald McKinnon, noting: "None of those soldiers has been charged with any offence, simply because there is no evidence against them as a result of a more or less obvious closing of ranks."

=== January 2004 ===
On January 1, Ghanem Kadhem Kati, an unarmed young man, was shot twice in the back by a British soldier at the door of his home. Troops had arrived at the scene after hearing gunfire, which neighbors reported was coming from a wedding party.

Six weeks later, investigators from the Royal Military Police exhumed the teenager's body. However, no compensation has been offered, and the inquiry's conclusion has yet to be announced.

Footage from the gun camera of a US Apache helicopter killing 3 suspected Iraqi insurgents near al-Taji. Originally shown on ABC TV.

Video footage from the gun camera of a U.S. Apache helicopter in Iraq, showing the killing of suspected Iraqi insurgents, was aired on ABC TV. The case sparked controversy due to the ambiguity of the video. In the footage, a cylindrical object is tossed on the ground in a field. The U.S. military identified the object as an RPG or mortar tube and subsequently fired upon the individuals.

However, IndyMedia UK suggested that the objects might have been harmless tools or implements. The publication also alleged that the helicopter fired upon a man who appeared to be wounded, which they argued would contradict international laws.

Retired U.S. Army General Robert Gard stated on German television that, in his opinion, the killings were "inexcusable murders."

=== April 2004 ===
On April 14, Lieutenant Ilario Pantano of the United States Marine Corps killed two unarmed captives. Pantano claimed that the captives had advanced on him in a threatening manner. The officer presiding over his Article 32 hearing recommended a court-martial for "body desecration." However, all charges against Pantano were dropped due to a lack of credible evidence or testimony. He later separated from the Marine Corps with an honorable discharge.

In February 2006, a video showing a group of British soldiers apparently beating several Iraqi teenagers was posted on the internet and soon broadcast on major television networks worldwide. The video, filmed in April 2004, was taken from an upper storey of a building in the southern Iraqi town of Al-Amarah. It shows a crowd of Iraqis outside a coalition compound.

After an altercation in which members of the crowd reportedly threw rocks and an improvised grenade at the soldiers, the soldiers rushed the crowd. They brought some Iraqi teenagers into the compound and proceeded to beat them. The video also includes a voiceover, apparently by the cameraman, taunting the beaten teenagers.

The person recording could be heard saying:

Oh, yes! Oh Yes! Now you gonna get it. You little kids. You little motherfucking bitch!, you little motherfucking bitch.

The event was broadcast in mainstream media, leading the British government and military to condemn it. The incident raised particular concerns for British soldiers, who had previously enjoyed a more favorable position than American soldiers in the region. Following the incident, there were media reports expressing concerns about the safety of soldiers in the country.

While the tape received some criticism from Iraq, it was relatively muted, and media outlets found individuals willing to speak out. The Royal Military Police conducted an investigation, but the prosecuting authorities determined that there was insufficient evidence to justify court-martial proceedings.

=== May 2004 ===
In May 2004, a British soldier identified as M004 mistreated captured, unarmed prisoners of war during a "tactical questioning" at Camp Abu Naji.

See: Mukaradeeb wedding party massacre

On May 19, 2004, the village of Mukaradeeb was attacked by American helicopters, resulting in the deaths of 42 men, women, and children. The casualties included 11 women and 14 children, as confirmed by Hamdi Noor al-Alusi, the manager of the nearest hospital. Western journalists also viewed the bodies of the children before they were buried.

=== November 2005 ===
See: Haditha killings

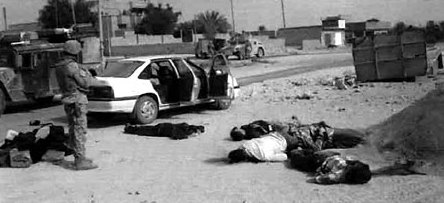
2005 Marine Killings in Haditha.

On November 19, 24 Iraqis were killed, at least 15 of whom, and allegedly all, were non-combatant civilians. All are believed to have been killed by a group of U.S. Marines. The ongoing investigation into the incident claimed to have found evidence that "supports accusations that U.S. Marines deliberately shot civilians, including unarmed women and children," according to an anonymous Pentagon official.

=== March 2006 ===
See: Mahmudiyah killings

On March 12, an Iraqi girl was raped and murdered along with her family in the Mahmudiyah killings. The incident led to the prosecution of the offenders and sparked a number of reprisal attacks against U.S. troops by insurgent forces.

See: Ishaqi incident

On March 15, 11 Iraqi civilians were allegedly bound and executed by U.S. troops in what is known as the "Ishaqi incident." A U.S. investigation concluded that military personnel had acted appropriately and followed the proper rules of engagement, responding to hostile fire and gradually escalating force until the threat was eliminated. The Iraqi government rejected the American conclusions. In September 2011, the Iraqi government reopened their investigation after WikiLeaks published a leaked diplomatic cable highlighting concerns raised by U.N. inspector Philip Alston, the Special Rapporteur on Extrajudicial, Summary, or Arbitrary Executions.

=== April 2006 ===
See: Hamdania incident

On April 26, U.S. Marines shot and killed an unarmed Iraqi man. An investigation by the Naval Criminal Investigative Service led to charges of murder, kidnapping, and conspiracy related to the cover-up of the incident. The defendants include seven Marines and a Navy Corpsman. As of February 2007, five of the defendants had pleaded guilty to lesser charges of kidnapping and conspiracy and agreed to testify against the remaining defendants, who face murder charges. Additional Marines from the same battalion faced lesser charges of assault related to the use of physical force during interrogations of suspected insurgents.

=== May 2006 ===
On May 9, U.S. troops from the 101st Airborne Division executed three male Iraqi detainees at the Muthana Chemical Complex. An investigation and lengthy court proceedings followed. Spc. William Hunsaker and Pfc. Corey Clagett both pleaded guilty to murder and were each sentenced to 18 years for premeditated murder. Spc. Juston Graber pleaded guilty to aggravated assault for shooting one of the wounded detainees and was sentenced to nine months. A fourth soldier, Staff Sgt. Ray Girouard of Sweetwater, Tennessee, was convicted of obstruction of justice, conspiracy to obstruct justice, and violation of a general order.

== Human rights in northern Iraq ==
In Iraqi Kurdistan, according to a 1995 Amnesty International report, the "prime responsibility for human rights abuses lies with the two parties holding the reins of power in Iraqi Kurdistan – the KDP and PUK," due to their political and military dominance. Amnesty reported that Francis Yusuf Shabo, an Assyrian Christian politician responsible for addressing complaints by Assyrian Christians about disputed villages, was shot dead on May 31, 1993, in Duhok, and no one had been brought to justice. Similarly, Lazar Mikho Hanna (known as Abu Nasir), another Assyrian Christian politician, was shot dead on June 14, 1993, in Duhok.

Amnesty criticized the impunity granted to Kurdish political parties' armed and special forces, noting that assailants were not held accountable. The report highlighted the "active undermining of the judiciary and the lack of respect for its independence by the political parties." It also documented incidents where Kurdish forces "arrested people arbitrarily," tortured detainees, killed civilians, and failed to bring perpetrators to justice.

The UNHCR reported incidents of violence against political opponents and minorities in areas under Kurdish control. Minority leaders have alleged that Kurdish political parties and forces have subjected them to violence, forced assimilation, discrimination, political marginalization, and arbitrary arrests and detention. The UNHCR noted that Kurdish parties and forces have been "considered responsible for arbitrary arrests, incommunicado detention, and torture of political opponents and members of ethnic/religious minorities."

The report also highlighted complaints from Christians about Kurdish attempts to assimilate them, as well as allegations of "the use of force, discrimination, and electoral fraud by Kurdish parties and militias." One notable incident occurred in October 2006, when KRG forces reportedly raided the building of a Christian media organization and detained its staff.

The UNHCR reported claims from Christian parties alleging "harassment and forced assimilation by Kurdish militias in Kirkuk and surrounding areas, with the aim of incorporating these areas into the Region of Kurdistan." Christians have accused Kurdish parties and their military forces of engaging in "acts of violence and discrimination, arbitrary arrests and detention on sectarian grounds, political marginalization (including through electoral manipulations), monopolization of government offices, and altering demographics to incorporate Kirkuk and other mixed areas into the Region of Kurdistan."

The Centre for Strategic and International Studies (CSIS) described this strategy as a form of "soft ethnic cleansing." According to the UNHCR, Christians have repeatedly complained about ongoing Kurdification efforts. The U.S. State Department also reported that "Kurdish authorities abused and discriminated against minorities in the North, including Turkmen, Arabs, Christians, and Shabak."

The UNHCR further noted that Kurdish parties "denied services to certain villages, arrested minorities without due process, detained them in undisclosed locations, and pressured minority schools to teach in the Kurdish language." (Note: There have also been accusations that Kurds were rigging votes in Kirkurk in 2005.) Additionally, Christians and Shabak people alleged that in the 2005 elections, "non-resident Kurds entered polling centers, and over 200 votes were cast illegally before the Multi-National Force intervened to stop the voting irregularities."

In 2005, a peaceful demonstration by Shabak people "turned violent after KDP gunmen shot at the crowd." The UNHCR reported that Christians were at "risk of arbitrary arrest and incommunicado detention" by Kurdish forces. The Washington Post highlighted extrajudicial detentions as early as 2005, describing a "concerted and widespread initiative" by Kurdish parties to assert authority in Kirkuk in an increasingly provocative manner. The report noted that arbitrary arrests and abductions by Kurdish militias had "greatly exacerbated tensions along purely ethnic lines."

The UN Assistance Mission for Iraq's Human Rights Office (UNAMI HRO) stated in 2007 that religious minorities "face increasing threats, intimidation, and detentions, often in KRG facilities run by Kurdish intelligence and security forces." The Washington Post estimated that there were 600 or more extrajudicial transfers, with detainees reporting "arbitrary arrests, incommunicado detentions, the use of torture, and unlawful confiscation of property."

Abuses by Kurdish forces ranged from "threats and intimidation to detention in undisclosed locations without due process." The Kurdish parties’ plans to incorporate "disputed areas" like Kirkuk into Kurdistan were met with resistance from Christian, Arab, and Turkmen groups.

The UNHCR noted that Christians and Arabs in Mosul, Kirkuk, and surrounding areas, which are "under de facto control of the KRG," have become victims of threats, harassment, and arbitrary detention. The UNHCR also reported that Christian and Arab internally displaced people (IDPs) face discrimination and that those expressing opposition to the Kurdish parties, such as by participating in demonstrations, risk "arbitrary arrest and detention."

The KDP and PUK have been "repeatedly accused of nepotism, corruption, and lack of internal democracy," according to the UNHCR. Journalists have claimed that press freedom is restricted and that criticism of the ruling parties can result in physical harassment, the seizure of cameras and notebooks, and arrest. For example, Kamal Sayid Qadir was sentenced to 30 years in prison after writing critically about Kurdish leader Masoud Barzani. The sentence was later reduced due to international pressure.

The UNHCR also reported arbitrary detentions of suspected political opponents by Kurdish authorities. Minorities have complained about "forcible assimilation into Kurdish society," increased discrimination against the non-Kurdish population, and efforts to dominate and "kurdify" traditionally mixed areas like Kirkuk. A 2006 poll conducted in Erbil, Sulaymaniyah, and Dahuk revealed that 79% of Kurds opposed allowing Arabs to enter Iraqi Kurdistan, and 63% opposed their settlement in the region.

Assyrian groups have stated that Kurdish authorities alter historical and geographical facts in school textbooks. For example, Assyrian Christian places are reportedly given new Kurdish names, and historical or Biblical figures are claimed to be Kurdish.

The American Mesopotamian Organization (AMO) demanded an official apology from Kurdistan President Massoud Barzani for the murder of Assyrians by Kurds in the past, alleging that thousands of Assyrian Christians were killed in the region over the last century. The AMO also criticized a message from Barzani on the occasion of Assyrian Martyrs Remembrance Day, which coincided with the 80th anniversary of the Semile massacre. The massacre, conducted by Kurdish general Bakr Sidqi, was referenced in Barzani's message, which controversially portrayed the Assyrians killed in the Simmele massacre as martyrs in the "Kurdistan liberation movement."

Assyrians in the Iraqi Kurdistan region face significant discrimination in various fields of work. Christian Assyrians are often limited to jobs as salespeople in liquor shops or as beauticians in salons, making them targets for Muslim extremists. In 2011, many Assyrian shops were burned. Additionally, Assyrians are reportedly excluded from professions such as police officers, soldiers, journalists for major media outlets, judges, and senior positions within educational institutions.

Local Assyrian history in the KRG-controlled area is often rebranded as Kurdish history. City names have been changed to Kurdish, and Assyrian heritage sites are reportedly neglected or destroyed. Furthermore, Assyrian history is not acknowledged in school textbooks, museums, or during memorial days.

There are also claims that Kurdish criminal organizations force Assyrian girls, particularly vulnerable refugees from southern Iraq, into prostitution. Those who refuse reportedly face death threats. These organizations are said to have ties to political leaders, enabling them to quickly issue passports and send these girls to European Union countries to work in the sex trade.

Assyrians allege that Kurds are actively working to "Kurdify" the local Christian population in northern Iraq. Reports indicate that Christians are sometimes forced to identify as Kurds to access essential services like education or healthcare. Similarly, Yazidis and Shabaks are not recognized as distinct ethnicities, and Assyrians from northern Iraq are increasingly pressured to identify as "Kurdistani" or "Kurdish Christians."

The KRG has also been accused of discriminatory practices against non-Kurdish minorities. Many Assyrians and Yazidis in the Nineveh Plains claim that the KRG has confiscated their property without compensation and has begun constructing settlements on their land. There have also been allegations of killings of Assyrians by agents of Kurdish political parties.

Reports suggest that the KRG uses tactics such as intimidation, threats, restricted access to services, arbitrary arrests, and extrajudicial detentions to pressure political opponents and ordinary members of minority communities into supporting the KRG’s efforts to expand into disputed territories. (Note: AINA reported that land disputes between Assyrians and Kurds have a long history, and claim that Kurds have used every opportunity to "seize their villages and lands through massacre, systematic killings and intimidation". They claim that this happened during the Kurdish revolt of the 1960s, the Simel massacre of 1933, the First World War and at other times. AINA also reported that textbooks used in Kurdish controlled areas are "replete with Kurdish flags and nationalist poems glorifying Kurdistan", and that only the Kurdish village names are used. AINA also noted that "hundreds of Kurdish families from Iran settled in the Assyrian town of Sarsing". Francis Yusuf Shabo was an Assyrian Christian politician who dealt with complaints by Assyrian Christians regarding villages from which they had been forcibly evicted during the Arabization and subsequently resettled by Arabs and Kurds. He was shot dead in Duhok in 1993. Lazar Mikho Hanna (known as Abu Nasir) was another Assyrian Christian politician who was shot dead in 1993 in Duhok. Amnesty International has reported that these killings were attributed to special forces within the KDP, PUK and IMIK. In 1997, two Assyrian politicians, Samir Moshi Murad and Peris Mirza Salyu, were killed near Arbil, by Kurdish students allegedly members of the PUK. In 1999 KDP members were accused of the rape and murder of 21-year old Assyrian woman Helena Sawa. In 2004, a "KDP militia attacked St. John the Baptist Syriac Catholic church in Bakhdida, and residents were severely beaten, finally taken away". In 2008, KRG authorities arrested Assyrian blogger Johnny Khoshaba al-Raykani based on critical articles he had written. Also reported is the arbitrary arrest and detainment of Hazim Nuh, a member of the ADM, Hammurabi Human Rights Organisation, and Tell-Kayf District Council, in 2009. A series of killings of Christians in Mosul was reported in 2008, with HRW and Washington Times writing about reports from Assyrian groups that Kurds may be behind the attacks. Kurdish authorities have denied their involvement. In 2011, radical imams in Zakho, Dohuk Province encouraged Sunni Muslim Kurds to riot and destroy Christian shops selling alcohol and churches and houses. Thirty shops were burned; and many other Christian buildings destroyed The New York Times reported that after Christians had to flee, Christian towns were being seized and occupied by Kurdish forces. Kurdish peshmerga used the fight against ISIL to expand their territory into Christian lands in the Nineveh Plain. Christian militias had to the Kurds for permission to travel in these regions. There were murders and imprisonment of many Assyrians over land disputes in northern Iraq, the rape of Assyrian girls and the assassination of two prominent Assyrians: Francis Shabo and Franso Hariri. Kurds in Zakho in northern Iraq rioted over four days, set dozens of liquor stores alight, attacked an Assyrian church and homes and destroyed property including four hotels, a health club and an Assyrian social club in Dohuk. The KRG has increased Kurdish expansionism at the expense of Assyrian interests. The KRG has systematically intimidated Assyrian politicians and has sought to flood the territory with Kurds and Kurdish security forces with the hope that an increase in the Kurdish populace and a weakening of political will among divided minority groups will allow them to annex the plains. As was reported from the wikileaks cables, continuing Kurdish intimidation continues to be a problem for Iraqi Christians. Assyrians have reported that there is an increasingly bellicose KRG policy as the result of the Kurds, desire not to lose what was gained in terms of self-rule after the first Gulf War. As a result, there is an ongoing trend toward authoritarianism in the KRG, and the Kurds are a highly tribalized society, prone to in-fighting and more Islamic extremism than was currently apparent. Radicals notwithstanding, there is greater tolerance for the Christian faith among Iraqi Arabs than among Iraqi Kurds.)

In 2014, Assyrians accused the Kurdistan Democratic Party (KDP) of systematically disarming and abandoning Assyrian and other minority communities in anticipation of an ISIS assault. The KRG reportedly distributed notices to Assyrians in northern Iraq, demanding their complete disarmament and assuring them that the Kurdish Peshmerga would protect them against ISIS. However, when ISIS launched its attacks, the Peshmerga abruptly retreated.

A similar situation occurred in the Sinjar region and Shingal, where Kurdish Peshmerga forces retreated as ISIS advanced in 2014. Peshmerga General Holgard Hekmat, a spokesman for the Peshmerga Ministry, admitted in an interview with SpiegelOnline: “Our soldiers just ran away. It’s a shame and apparently a reason why they invent such allegations.”

As a result of these events, approximately 150,000 Assyrian Christians were violently displaced from their ancestral homes in the Nineveh Plains. A KRG official was quoted in a Reuters article in 2014, stating, “ISIL gave us in two weeks what Maliki couldn’t give us in eight years.”

Some Assyrians activists claim they have suffered not only from Arabization but also from Kurdification in Iraqi Kurdistan. These activists allege that the number of Christians living in the region has declined due to the destruction of villages and the implementation of Kurdification policies.

Historically, Christians, including Assyrian Christians, made up a much larger proportion of the population in northern Iraq and Iraqi Kurdistan than they do today. Their numbers have significantly decreased due to massacres, displacement, and other factors.

Additionally, the region is home to crypto-Christians–individuals who outwardly identify as Kurdish Muslims but retain memories of their Armenian or Nestorian Christian heritage. Relations between the remaining Christian population and the Kurds have often been strained.

According to Assyrian expert Michael Youash, some Christians became refugees because Kurds seized their land, and the Kurdistan Regional Government (KRG) failed to assist them in reclaiming it. In 2007, Youash also reported "numerous instances of Kurdish authorities discriminating against minorities in the North," noting that authorities denied services to certain villages, arrested minorities without due process, and pressured minority schools to teach in Kurdish.

Additionally, reports indicate that Christians who lack political representation struggle to expand their schools and often face exclusion from anything beyond basic funding. Assyrian groups criticized the Kurdish authorities' investigations into a series of bombings targeting Christians in 1998 and 1999.

Assyrians have also been victims of attacks by the Kurdistan Workers Party (PKK) and have often been caught in intra-Kurdish conflicts. For instance, in 1997, six Assyrians were killed during a PKK attack in Dohuk. A 1999 U.S. government country report cited allegations by the Assyrian International News Agency about the murder and rape of Helena Aloun Sawa, an Assyrian housekeeper for a KDP politician. Assyrians alleged that this case fit a "well-established pattern" of Kurdish authorities' complicity in attacks against Assyrian Christians in northern Iraq.

In more recent times, some scholars have noted that in northern Iraq, particularly in the area of "ancient Assyria," Kurdish expansion has come at the expense of the Assyrian population. Due to both Arab and Kurdish intimidation policies, particularly by the Kurdish Democratic Party (KDP), the Aramaic-speaking Christian population has been significantly reduced. It has been claimed that Kurds have "raised impediments to the acquisition of international aid for development, attempted to prevent the establishment of Aramaic language schools, and blocked the creation of Christian Assyrian schools." These issues have also been criticized by the U.S. State Department.

Additionally, attacks on Christians have been perpetrated by both Arab and Kurdish Islamist groups, such as ISIS and the Kurdish Ansar ul-Islam. (Note: The "Assyrian Human Rights Report" states among other things that "as far as the Assyrian community in concerned, the most important role remained the adjudication of expropriation of Assyrian lands at the hands of the Kurds in northern Iraq." Kurds subsequently resettled villages illegally from where they had evicted Assyrians, and have not allowed Assyrians to resettle their lands. The report also states that "recent attacks against Assyrian civilians by Kurds in northern Iraq and by others elsewhere in the country have recently increased, and most of the villages have been subsequently reclaimed by Kurds. It also notes that "following the establishment of the a safe Haven further land grabs by Kurds directly or indirectly supported by local Kurdish authorities have led to the expropriation of lands from 52 additional villages in northern Iraq". Assyrian leader Francis Shabo who was working on this issue was later assassinated. The report also said that in spring 1996, "an attempt was made to Kurdify the educational curriculum". Assyrian girls were kidnapped, raped and forcefully married to Kurds. Such incidents include Wassan Michael, an Assyrian girl from Simele who was kidnapped in 1996 and forced to marry one of the Kurdish kidnappers. In 1996 an Assyrian girl was abducted by a Kurd named Mohamed Babakir.) Kurdish forces have also been accused of harassing Arab residents.

Assyrian Christian refugees have been blocked from returning to their villages across the Nineveh Plain by the Kurdish Regional Government (KRG), according to a report from The Investigative Project on Terrorism. Jeff Gardiner, director of Restore Nineveh Now, stated, "The Kurdish authorities did not protect the people of the Nineveh Plain. In a way, this was enabled by the Kurdish government. They really set them [Assyrians] up for this catastrophic outcome." Gardiner dismissed claims of a security risk, calling the KRG's actions a "land grab."

Robert Nicholson of The Philos Project remarked, "For months we've been receiving numerous reports from Assyrian Christians and Yazidis that Kurdish forces are using the fog of war to seize land that rightfully belongs to victims of genocide. Each week those reports are increasing. The Nineveh Plain has never been a Kurdish territory. It belongs to the Christians (Assyrians) and Yazidis who have been living there for thousands of years." Members of the Nineveh Protection Units, an Assyrian militia, have faced obstruction by the KRG, with their movements impeded by Kurdish forces.

In a letter to Kurdistani President Masoud Barzani, John McCain expressed concern about "reports of land confiscation and statements you have made regarding Kurdish territorial claims to the Nineveh Plains region." According to Gardner, "This is nothing new. Assyrian Christians complained about the illegal settlement of Kurdistani families on Assyrian land in the early 1990s. The ultimate strategy aims to unify Iraq's Kurds with those in Syria and Turkey in a broader Kurdish state."

In December 2011, hundreds of Kurds in Zakho burned and destroyed Christian Assyrian businesses and hotels after Friday prayers. Human rights groups suggested that the riots were planned by Kurdish authorities, noting that security representatives had made inquiries about liquor stores three days before the riots and that security forces did not intervene to stop the violence. Assyrians also face discrimination in the labor market and are burdened with administrative tasks, such as the annual requirement for Internally Displaced Persons to obtain a residence permit. Assyrian students are treated and graded differently from Kurdish students. Additionally, Assyrians "suffer abuses and discrimination as a result of the KRG's aspirations to extend its control and its plans to reshape the demographics of Mosul and the Nineveh Plains." An official police force composed of Assyrians "has not been established due to massive resistance from Kurdish groups."

Government complicity in "religiously motivated discrimination has been reported in the Kurdish Regional Government (KRG)." According to the State Department, Christians "living in areas north of Mosul asserted that the KRG confiscated their property without compensation," and Assyrian Christians also alleged that the Kurdish Democratic Party-dominated judiciary routinely discriminates against non-Muslims. Chaldo-Assyrian Christians have stated that KRG officials "deny Christians key social benefits, including employment and housing," and that "foreign reconstruction assistance for Assyrian communities is being controlled by the KRG." KRG officials have used "public works projects to divert water and other vital resources from Assyrian to Kurdish communities." These deprivations led to a mass exodus, followed by "the seizure and conversion of abandoned Assyrian property by the local Kurdish population." Turkmen groups report "similar abuses by Kurdish officials, suggesting a pattern of pervasive discrimination, harassment, and marginalization."

Violence against Iraq's Christian community "remains a significant concern, particularly in Baghdad and the northern Kurdish regions," with a pattern of "official discrimination, harassment, and marginalization by KRG officials exacerbating these conditions." Kurdish groups have been accused of attempting to annex territories belonging to Assyrians, "claiming that these areas are historically Kurdish." Since 2003, "Kurdish peshmerga, security forces, and political parties have moved into these territories, establishing de facto control over many of the disputed areas." Assyrians, Shabak, and Turkomen groups have accused Kurdish forces "of engaging in systematic abuses and discrimination against them to further Kurdish territorial claims." These accusations include "reports of Kurdish officials interfering with minorities' voting rights, encroaching on, seizing, and refusing to return minority land, conditioning the provision of services and assistance to minority communities on support for Kurdish expansion, forcing minorities to identify themselves as either Arabs or Kurds, and impeding the formation of local minority police forces."

=== Freedom of speech and political freedom ===
Kurdish officials in Iraq have accused the ruling Kurdistan Democratic Party (KDP), led by Masoud Barzani, of "all kinds of intimidation," corruption, and ballot stuffing. During the 2005 elections, "Kurdish authorities, tasked with delivering ballot boxes to Assyrian districts in Iraqi Kurdistan, failed to do so, while Assyrian election workers were fired upon and killed." As a consequence, the Assyrian Democratic Movement was marginalized.

== The current state of human rights ==
Numerous human rights organizations and Shiite officials have raised significant criticisms, alleging that Sunni groups have systematically kidnapped, tortured, and killed Shiites or those they consider enemies. Amnesty International has also extensively criticized the Iraqi government for its handling of the Walid Yunis Ahmad case, in which an ethnically Turkmen journalist from Iraqi Kurdistan was held for ten years without charge or trial.

According to the Human Rights Watch annual report, the human rights situation in Iraq remains deplorable. Since 2015, the country has been embroiled in a bloody armed conflict involving ISIS and a coalition of Kurdish forces, central Iraqi government forces, pro-government militias, and a United States-led international air campaign. The United Nations reported that 3.2 million Iraqis were displaced due to the conflict. Furthermore, the international organization stated that the warring parties employed various methods, including extrajudicial executions, suicide attacks, and airstrikes, which resulted in the deaths and injuries of over 20,000 civilians.

An Amnesty International report concluded that the Peshmerga forces of the semi-autonomous Kurdistan Regional Government (KRG) were preventing residents of Arab villages and Arab residents of mixed Arab-Kurdish towns from returning to their homes. In some cases, the Peshmerga forces had destroyed or allowed the destruction of homes and property, seemingly to prevent residents from returning in the future. Amnesty reported that Arab houses were often looted, intentionally burned, bulldozed, or blown up after fighting had ended, and the Peshmerga had taken control of these areas. These actions were not isolated incidents but part of a broader pattern.

The report emphasized that the forced displacement of Arab residents and the extensive, unlawful destruction of civilian homes and property violated international humanitarian law and should be investigated as war crimes. For example, the village of Tabaj Hamid was completely razed, and in Jumeili, 95% of all walls and structures were destroyed. Amnesty International researchers reported being apprehended by Peshmerga forces, who escorted them out of the area and prevented them from taking photographs.

Amnesty stated that the deliberate demolition of civilian homes is unlawful under international humanitarian law and considered these acts of forced displacement to constitute war crimes. The organization also urged KRG authorities to conduct prompt and independent investigations into all deaths that occurred during protests against the KDP, such as those in October 2015, and to disclose the findings.

Amnesty International criticized the Peshmerga forces of the Kurdistan Regional Government (KRG) and Kurdish militias in northern Iraq for bulldozing, blowing up, and burning thousands of homes in what appears to be an effort to uproot Arab communities. The report, Banished and Dispossessed: Forced Displacement and Deliberate Destruction in Northern Iraq, is based on field investigations in Iraq. It stated, “Tens of thousands of Arab civilians who were forced to flee their homes because of fighting are now struggling to survive in makeshift camps in desperate conditions. Many have lost their livelihoods and all their possessions, and with their homes destroyed, they have nothing to return to. By barring the displaced from returning to their villages and destroying their homes, KRG forces are further exacerbating their suffering.” The report provided evidence of forced displacement and large-scale destruction of homes in villages and towns by Peshmerga forces.

Human Rights Watch also reported that Kurds denied Arabs the right to return to their homes while allowing Kurds free movement, even permitting Kurds to move into homes that belonged to Arabs. In a 2016 report titled ‘Where Are We Supposed to Go?’: Destruction and Forced Displacement in Kirkuk, Amnesty International documented cases of Kurdish authorities demolishing and bulldozing homes and forcibly displacing hundreds of Arab residents.

In 2005, during a demonstration by the Democratic Shabak Coalition, the KDP opened fire on protestors, killing two Assyrians and wounding several Assyrians and Shabak participants. Additionally, Assyrian groups have accused Kurdish authorities of election rigging in northern Iraq and of preventing Assyrian representation in politics.

The Shabak people have also suffered from discrimination. Hunain al-Qaddo, a Shabak politician, told Human Rights Watch that "the Peshmerga have no genuine interest in protecting his community and that Kurdish security forces are more interested in controlling Shabaks and their leaders than protecting them." He further stated that Shabaks are "suffering at the hands of the Peshmerga and that the Kurdish government refuses to let the Iraqi armed forces protect them or allow them to establish their own Shabak police force to safeguard their community."

Kurdish forces have been implicated in some attacks against Shabaks. In 2008, Mullah Khadim Abbas, the leader of the Shabak Democratic Gathering—a group opposing the incorporation of Shabak villages into the KRG—was killed only 150 meters from a Peshmerga outpost. Before his assassination, Abbas had angered Kurdish authorities by criticizing Shabaks who supported Kurdish agendas and denouncing Kurdish policies that, in his view, undermined the identity of the Shabak community.

In 2009, Shabak lawmaker al-Qaddo survived an assassination attempt in the Nineveh Plains. He told Human Rights Watch that the attackers wore Kurdish security uniforms. Al-Qaddo alleged that the Kurdish government aimed to impose its will on the Shabak and acquire their lands by silencing him.

Shabak leaders have frequently complained about the lack of accountability for killings. In some incidents, the KDP was accused of failing to investigate the deaths of non-Kurdish civilians at the hands of the Peshmerga. Human Rights Watch noted that "the root of the problem is the near-universal perception among Kurdish leaders that minority groups are, in fact, Kurds." The report further stated that Kurdish authorities have sometimes dealt harshly with Yazidi and Shabak individuals who resisted attempts to impose a Kurdish identity on them.

== Sectarian warfare in Iraq ==
Iraq experienced a state of sectarian civil war from 2006 to 2008. During this period, small groups and militias carried out bombings in civilian areas and assassinations targeting officials at various levels, as well as Shiites and smaller religious minorities. Secular-oriented individuals, officials of the new government, aides to the United States (such as translators), and individuals and families from the country's various religious groups faced violence and death threats.

=== Refugee response to threats to life ===
See also Refugees of Iraq.

As a result of attempted murders and death threats, approximately 2 million Iraqis fled the country, primarily seeking refuge in Syria, Jordan, and Egypt.

== Propaganda ==
On February 17, 2006, then U.S. Secretary of Defense Donald Rumsfeld discussed the emergence of new realities in the media age:

"In Iraq, for example, the U.S. military command, working closely with the Iraqi government and the U.S. embassy, has sought nontraditional means to provide accurate information to the Iraqi people in the face of aggressive campaign of disinformation. Yet this has been portrayed as inappropriate; for example, the allegations of someone in the military hiring a contractor, and the contractor allegedly paying someone to print a story—a true story—but paying to print a story."

On March 3, 2006, Army General George Casey stated, "The U.S. military plans to continue paying Iraqi newspapers to publish articles favorable to the United States after an inquiry found no fault with the controversial practice." Casey explained that an internal review had concluded the U.S. military was not violating U.S. law or Pentagon guidelines with its information operations campaign. As part of this campaign, U.S. troops and a private contractor wrote pro-American articles and paid to have them published in Iraqi media without attribution.

The legal status of freedom of speech and the press in Iraq remains unclear. While both freedoms are guaranteed in the Iraqi Constitution, they include exemptions for Islamic morality and national security. Additionally, the 1969 Iraqi Criminal Code contains vague prohibitions against using the press or any electronic means of communication for "indecent" purposes.

== Women's rights ==
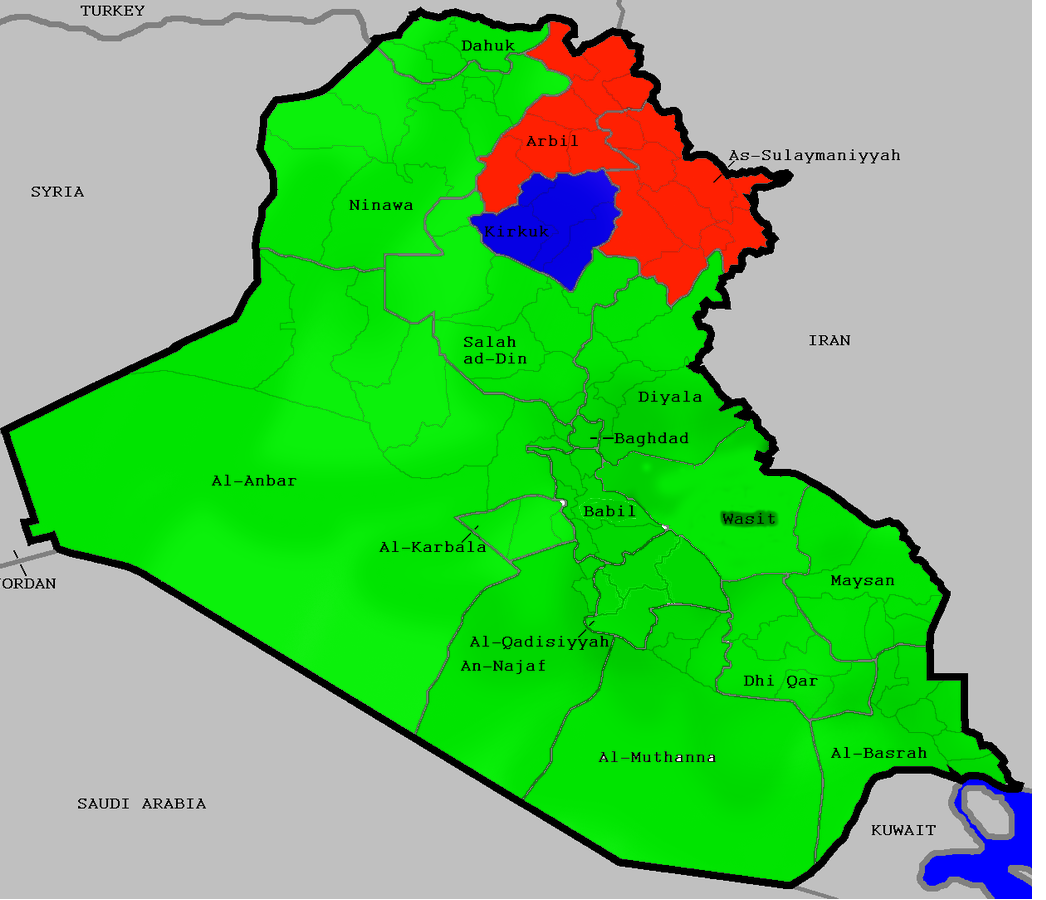
Prevalence of female genital mutilation in Iraq for women aged 15–49 using UNICEF "Female Genital Mutilation/Cutting, 2013. There is a more recent 2016 survey here:. Green = Less than 3%, Blue = 15-25%, Red = Above 50%. The highest prevalence rates of FGM are in Kirkuk (20%), Sulaymaniyah (54%) and Erbil (58%).

Women in Iraq at the beginning of the 21st century face a status that is influenced by many factors, including wars (most recently the Iraq War), sectarian religious conflict, debates concerning Islamic law and Iraq's Constitution, cultural traditions, and modern secularism. Hundreds of thousands of Iraqi women have been widowed as a result of a series of wars and internal conflicts. Women's rights organizations continue to struggle against harassment and intimidation as they work to promote improvements to women's status in law, education, the workplace, and many other spheres of Iraqi life. According to a 2008 report in the Washington Post, the Kurdistan region of Iraq is one of the few places in the world where female genital mutilation has been rampant. In 2008, the United Nations Assistance Mission for Iraq (UNAMI) stated that honor killings are a serious concern in Iraq, particularly in Iraqi Kurdistan. Honor killings are common in the region, and women also face forced and underage marriage, domestic violence, and polygamy issues. Since the early 1990s, several thousand Iraqi Kurdish women have died from self-immolation.

== Other human rights ==
The United States, through the CPA, abolished the death penalty (which has since been reinstated) and ordered that the Criminal Code of 1969 (as amended in 1985) and the Civil Code of 1974 would be the operating legal system in Iraq. However, there has been some debate regarding the extent to which the CPA rules have been applied.

For example, the Iraqi Criminal Code of 1969 (as amended in 1985) does not prohibit the formation of trade unions, and the Iraqi Constitution promises that such organizations will be recognized (a right under Article 23 of the Universal Declaration of Human Rights). However, for some reason, the Iraqi courts and special tribunals seem to be operating under a slightly revised version of the 1988 legal code, which means that the 1987 ban on unions might still be in place.

Likewise, while the Iraqi Criminal Code of 1969 or the apparent 1988 edition does not expressly prohibit homosexual relations between consenting adults in private (a right under a United Nations Human Rights Commission ruling in 1994), scattered reports suggest that homosexuality is still being treated as a crime, possibly a capital crime under a 2001 amendment that technically should not exist. For more information on this topic, see Gay rights in Iraq.

== Post COVID-19 rights ==
During COVID-19, the Iraqi government implemented stricter curfews and limited shopping hours instead of full lockdowns, aiming to keep the economy afloat. However, human welfare significantly worsened due to droughts in the area. The modern government did not provide adequate assistance to the majority of the population during the crisis. All but two refugee camps were closed, and internally displaced people were targeted by armed forces. Many of these displaced families had been fleeing the Syrian civil war. In December and November 2021, heavy rainfall caused flash floods, leading to many families becoming homeless or displaced, both internally and externally.

== See also ==
- Prisoner abuse
- Operation Phantom Fury
- Human rights in pre-Saddam Iraq
- Human rights in Saddam Hussein's Iraq
- 2003 invasion of Iraq
- Abu Ghraib prisoner abuse
- Human Rights Record of the United States
- Country Reports on Human Rights Practices
- Slavery in Iraq
- Gay rights in Iraq
- Refugees of Iraq
- Sectarianism
- Religious war
