= Remembering Saddam =

Documentary by Don North

Remembering Saddam is a 2004 documentary by Don North, a television news producer. It has a run time of one hour.

The film follows the story of nine Iraqi businessmen who were arrested in 1995 by Saddam Hussein's regime which was notorious for human rights abuses. They were charged with dealing in foreign currency and imprisoned in Abu Ghraib prison. After a short trial with no defense representation, they were sentenced to amputation of their right hands. The amputation was videotaped and used by Saddam Hussein as a deterrent to other would-be criminals. An "X of shame" was also carved into the foreheads of each man by the surgeons. North was inspired to make the documentary after watching the footage in mid-2003 on a visit to Baghdad.

After the 2003 U.S. invasion of Iraq, North tracked down the nine men; seven of them (one was deceased) agreed to tell their stories. The documentary follows their story as organizations are lined up to donate surgical services, transportation and prosthetic limbs. Transportation was provided by Continental Airlines. Dr. Agris and Dr. Kestler of Houston donated their time. Medical facilities were provided by Methodist Hospital in Houston. The prosthetic hands which normally cost $50,000 each were donated by Otto Bock, a German-American company. The gruesome footage of their amputations performed by doctors in the employ of Saddam Hussein is presented in increments as the documentary unfolds. The "Xs of shame" on every man's forehead were also removed.

The Wall Street Journal opinion columnist Daniel Henninger wrote on May 14, 2004, "And Don North's film indeed should be seen—but may not be. After two months of trying, no U.S. broadcast or cable network will take it." The United States Department of Defense secured permission to air the film in the Middle East. Alhurra received the rights to broadcast it. Remembering Saddam was broadcast in Iraq as well as in the Middle East and Europe on May 24, 2004.
