= Mukaradeeb wedding party massacre =

US military action against Iraqi village

- Part of the Iraq War
- Location: 34°0′28″N 40°12′08″E; Mukaradeeb, Anbar Province, Iraq
- Date: 19 May 2004; 22 years ago
- Target: Iraqi civilians
- Attack type: Mass shooting, bombing
- Deaths: 42; including 11 women and 14 children
- Perpetrator: United States

The Mukaradeeb wedding party massacre (Arabic: مجزرة حفلة عرس مكر الذيب, romanized: Majzarat haflat eurs Makr Alldhiyb) refers to the U.S. military's attack on a wedding party in Mukaradeeb, a small village in Anbar Province, Iraq near the border with Syria, on 19 May 2004. The attack killed 42 civilians and wounded many others. The U.S. military denied that a wedding had been hit, claiming the location was a legitimate military target and that insurgents had been killed. U.S. military generals refused to apologize for the massacre.

== Incident ==
The wedding brought together members of the Rakat and Sabah families: Ashad Rakat was the groom and Rutba Sabah the bride. Witnesses report that the American bombing started at 3:00 AM. Witness at the wedding said that guests had fired weapons into the air. The attack begun at 2:45 AM from the air. Local accounts state that 42 people, including 11 women and 14 children, were killed during the incident. Iraqi officials reported 13 children among the dead. 27 members of the extended Rakat family were killed. Following the attack, U.S. officials stated that the location was a "suspected foreign fighter safe house." They stated that "anti-coalition forces" fired first, and that they returned fire killing numerous insurgents and destroying many vehicles. They further said that weapons, foreign passports and money, and a radio were recovered.

== Reaction ==
The U.S. military took the stance that the location was a legitimate target. Brigadier General Mark Kimmitt, the coalition deputy chief of staff for U.S. operations in Iraq: "We took ground fire and we returned fire. We estimate that around 40 were killed. But we operated within our rules of engagement." U.S. fire included both bullets and bombs, leaving behind craters.

In the aftermath, Kimmitt said, "There was no evidence of a wedding: no decorations, no musical instruments found, no large quantities of food or leftover servings one would expect from a wedding celebration. There may have been some kind of celebration. Bad people have celebrations, too." USMC Major General James Mattis asserted that even the idea of a wedding was implausible, "How many people go to the middle of the desert ... to hold a wedding 80 miles (130km) from the nearest civilization? These were more than two dozen military-age males. Let's not be naive." The Rakats and the Sabahs were residents of Mukaradeeb. Mattis later added that it had taken him 30 seconds to deliberate on bombing the location.

Video footage obtained by the Associated Press contradicts this. The video shows a series of scenes of a wedding celebration, and footage from the following day shows fragments of musical instruments, pots and pans and brightly colored beddings used for celebrations, scattered around a destroyed tent.

Despite evidence against U.S. military, its generals refused to apologize for the actions.

== See also ==
- Human rights in post-invasion Iraq
- Command responsibility

=== Incidents ===
- Ishaqi incident
- Haditha killings
- Mahmudiyah rape and killings
- Deh Bala wedding party bombing
- My Lai Massacre in Vietnam
