= Ishaqi massacre =

Massacre committed by US troops in Iraq, 2006

Coordinates: 34.2833°N 43.7667°E

The Ishaqi massacre refers to the reported mass murder of Iraqi civilians allegedly committed by United States forces in the town of Ishaqi on 15 March 2006.

After the massacre, Iraqi police accused the US troops of rounding up and deliberately shooting 11 people, including five children and four women, before blowing up their house. A US military spokesman at the time responded that it was "highly unlikely that [the allegations] were true". US authorities said US troops were involved in a firefight after a tip-off that an al-Qaeda supporter was visiting the house. According to the Americans, the building collapsed under heavy fire, killing four people—a suspect, two women, and a child.

Leaked diplomatic cables in 2011 revealed that Philip Alston, United Nations special rapporteur on Extrajudicial, Summary, or Arbitrary Executions, immediately raised questions about the incident.

In June 2006, the US indicated they were re-investigating the incident, after the BBC obtained a tape from "a hardline Sunni group" that appeared to contain evidence supporting the allegations of the Iraqi police. The investigation found that US military personnel had followed the proper procedures and rules of engagement and were not guilty of misconduct. The Iraqi government immediately rejected the results of the US probe, stating they would continue investigating.

Immediately after the US investigation was closed, the Iraqi government responded by opening an investigation, with Iraqi Prime Minister Nouri Maliki aide Adnan al-Kazimi stating that the US report "was not fair for the Iraqi people and the children who were killed."

In September 2011, the Iraqi government reopened its investigation after WikiLeaks published a leaked diplomatic cable in which Philip Alston, United Nations special rapporteur on Extrajudicial, Summary, or Arbitrary Executions, appeared to support the version of events given by residents in Ishaqi. Alston cabled the US State Department a few weeks after the incident. Alston stated that US forces handcuffed and executed the residents of a house on 15 March 2006. The residents included five children under 5 years of age. Autopsies later confirmed that "all the corpses were shot in the head and handcuffed".

== See also ==
- Command responsibility
- Haditha killings
- Hamdania incident
- Mahmudiyah incident
- Mukaradeeb wedding party massacre
- United States war crimes
