= Mukaradeeb =

Mukaradeeb مكر الذيب
- Location within Iraq
- Coordinates: 34°00′28.0″N 40°12′08.0″E
- Country: Iraq
- Province: Al-Anbar
- District: Al-Qa'im
- Time zone: UTC+3 (GMT+3)

Mukaradeeb or Makr al-Theeb (Arabic: مكر الذيب) is a small village in Iraq near the Syrian border.

== See also ==
- Mukaradeeb wedding party massacre
