= Human rights in Ba'athist Iraq =

Human rights issues from 1979 to 2003

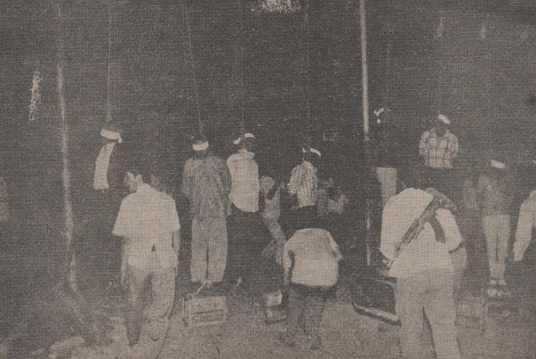
Hangings in Saddam-era Iraq

Under the Arab Socialist Ba'ath Party, Iraq's human rights record was considered one of the worst in the world. Secret police, state terrorism, torture, mass murder, genocide, ethnic cleansing, rape, deportations, extrajudicial killings, forced disappearances, assassinations, chemical warfare, and the destruction of the Mesopotamian marshes were some of the methods Saddam Hussein and the country's Ba'athist government used to maintain control. Saddam committed crimes of aggression during the Iran–Iraq War and the Gulf War, which violated the Charter of the United Nations. The total number of deaths and disappearances related to repression during this period is unknown, but is estimated to be at least 250,000 to 290,000 according to Human Rights Watch, with the great majority of those occurring as a result of the Anfal genocide in 1988 and the suppression of the uprisings in Iraq in 1991. Human Rights Watch and Amnesty International issued regular reports of widespread imprisonment and torture.

== Documented human rights violations 1979–2003 ==
Human rights organizations have documented government-approved executions, acts of torture and rape for decades since Saddam Hussein came to power in 1979 until his fall in 2003.

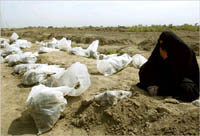
Mass grave.

- In 2002, a resolution sponsored by the European Union was adopted by the Commission for Human Rights, which stated that there had been no improvement in the human rights crisis in Iraq. The statement condemned President Saddam Hussein's government for its "systematic, widespread and extremely grave violations of human rights and international humanitarian law" and called on Iraq to cease "summary and arbitrary executions ... the use of rape as a political tool and all enforced and involuntary disappearances".
- Full political participation at the national level was restricted only to members of the Ba'ath Party, which constituted only 8% of the population.
- Iraqi citizens were not legally allowed to assemble unless it was in express support of the Ba'athist government. The Iraqi government controlled the establishment of political parties, regulated their internal affairs and monitored their activities.
- Police checkpoints on Iraq's roads and highways prevented ordinary citizens from traveling across country without government permission and expensive exit visas prevented Iraqi citizens from traveling abroad. Before traveling, an Iraqi citizen had to post collateral. Iraqi females could not travel outside of the country without the escort of a male relative.
- The Persecution of Feyli Kurds under Saddam Hussein, also known as the Feyli Kurdish genocide, was a systematic persecution of Feylis by Saddam Hussein between 1970 and 2003. The persecution campaigns led to the expulsion, flight and effective exile of the Feyli Kurds from their ancestral lands in Iraq. The persecution began when a large number of Feyli Kurds were exposed to a big campaign by the regime that began by the dissolved RCCR issuance for 666 decision, which deprived Feyli Kurds of Iraqi nationality and considered them as Iranians. The systematic executions started in Baghdad and Khanaqin in 1979 and later spread to other Iraqi and Kurdish areas. It is estimated that around 25,000 Feyli Kurds died due to captivity and torture.
- Halabja poison gas attack: The Halabja poison gas attack occurred in the period 15–19 March 1988 during the Iran–Iraq War when chemical weapons were used by the Iraqi government forces and thousands of civilians in the Iraqi Kurdish town of Halabja were killed.

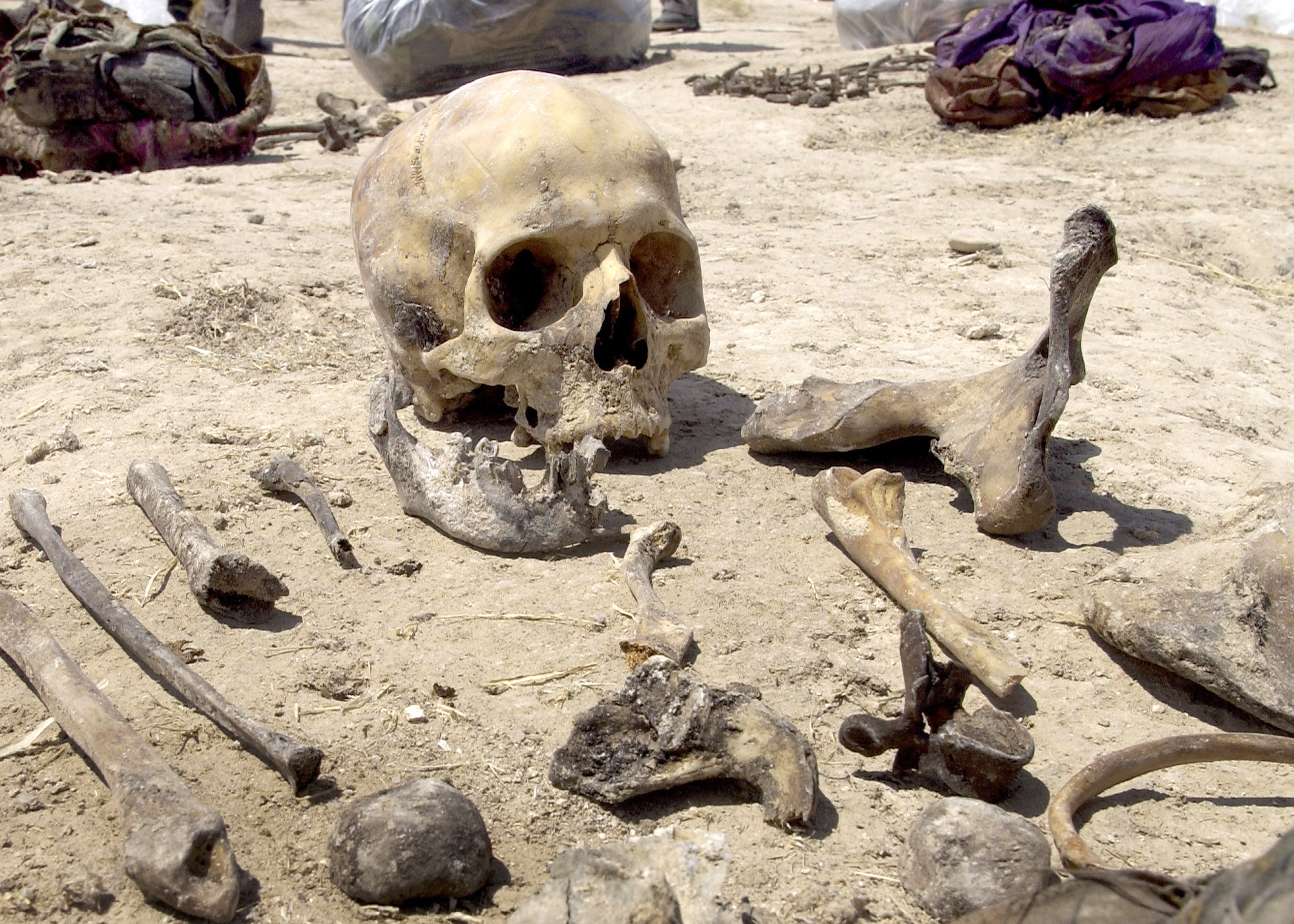
Mass grave of Anfal victims

- Anfal campaign: In 1988, the Hussein regime began a campaign of extermination against the Kurdish people living in Northern Iraq. This is known as the Anfal campaign. A team of Human Rights Watch investigators determined, after analyzing eighteen tons of captured Iraqi documents, testing soil samples and carrying out interviews with more than 350 witnesses, that the attacks on the Kurdish people were characterized by gross violations of human rights. These included the mass execution and forced disappearance of many tens of thousands of noncombatants, widespread use of chemical weapons including Sarin, mustard gas and nerve agents, arbitrary imprisonment - including of women, children and the elderly - in conditions of extreme deprivation, the forced displacement of hundreds of thousands of villagers after the demolition of their homes, and the wholesale destruction of nearly two thousand villages along with their schools, mosques, farms and power stations.
- 50,000 to 70,000 Shia were arrested in the 1980s and never heard from again.
- 8,000 Kurds from the Barzani clan were disappeared and likely killed.
- 50,000 dissidents, party members, Kurds, and other minorities were disappeared and presumably killed in the 1980s through 1990s
- Execution of Turkmen intellectuals
- In April 1991, after Saddam lost control of Kuwait in the Persian Gulf War, he cracked down ruthlessly against several uprisings in the Kurdish north and the Shia south. His forces committed full-scale massacres and other gross human rights violations against both groups similar to the violations mentioned before.
- During the 1991 uprisings, over 200,000 Shia Arabs and 100,000 Marsh Arabs died in southern Iraq, while over 100,000 Assyrians fled Iraq.
- In June 1994, the Hussein regime in Iraq established severe penalties, including amputation, branding and the death penalty for criminal offenses such as theft, corruption, currency speculation and military desertion, some of which are part of Islamic Sharia law, while government members and members of Saddam's family were immune from punishments for these crimes.
- In 2001, the Iraqi government amended the Constitution to make sodomy a capital offense.
- In 1996 more than 40 Iraqi Turkmen were massacred in Erbil.
- On March 23, 2003, during the 2003 invasion of Iraq, Iraqi television presented and interviewed prisoners of war on TV, violating the Geneva Convention.
- Also in April 2003, CNN revealed that it had withheld information about Iraq torturing journalists and Iraqi citizens in the 1990s. According to CNN's chief news executive, the channel had been concerned for the safety not only of its own staff, but also of Iraqi sources and informants, who could expect punishment for speaking freely to reporters. Also according to the executive, "other news organizations were in the same bind."
- After the 2003 invasion of Iraq, several mass graves were found in Iraq containing several thousand bodies total and more are being uncovered to this day. While most of the dead in the graves were believed to have died in the 1991 uprising against Saddam Hussein, some of them appeared to have died due to executions or died at times other than the 1991 rebellion.
- Also after the invasion, numerous torture centers were found in security offices and police stations throughout Iraq. The equipment found at these centers typically included hooks for hanging people by the hands for beatings, devices for electric shock and other equipment often found in nations with harsh security services and other authoritarian nations.

== "Saddam's Dirty Dozen" ==
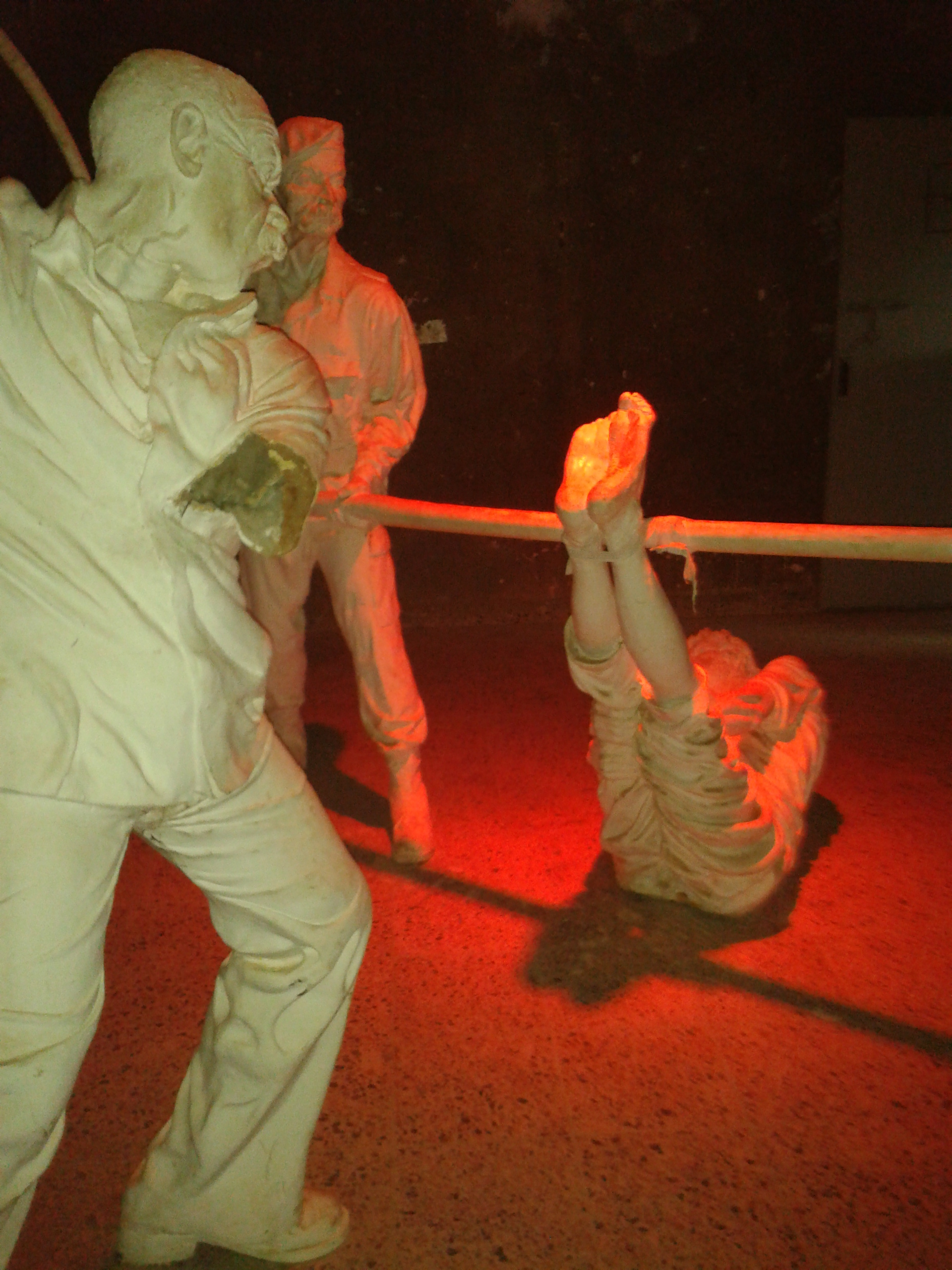
Depiction of torture (falanga) at the Amna Suraka museum in Sulaimaniyya

According to officials of the United States State Department, many human rights abuses in Saddam Hussein's Iraq were largely carried out in person or by the orders of Saddam Hussein and eleven other people. The term "Saddam's Dirty Dozen" was coined in October 2002 (from a novel by E.M. Nathanson, later adapted as a film directed by Robert Aldrich) and used by US officials to describe this group. Most members of the group held high positions in the Iraqi government and membership went all the way from Saddam's personal guard to Saddam's sons. The list was used by the Bush Administration to help argue that the 2003 Iraq war was against Saddam Hussein and the Baath Party leadership, rather than against the Iraqi people. The members are:

- Saddam Hussein (1937–2006), Iraqi President, responsible for many torturings, killings and of ordering the 1988 cleansing of Kurds in Northern Iraq.
- Qusay Hussein (1966–2003), son of the president, head of the elite Republican Guard, believed to have been chosen by Saddam as his successor.
- Uday Hussein (1964–2003), son of the president, had a private torture chamber, and was responsible for the rapes and killings of many women. He was partially paralyzed after a 1996 attempt on his life, and was leader of the paramilitary group Fedayeen Saddam and of the Iraqi media.
- Taha Yassin Ramadan (1938–2007), Vice-President, born in Iraqi Kurdistan. He oversaw the mass killings of a Shi'a revolt in 1991.
- Tariq Aziz (1936–2015), Foreign Minister of Iraq, backed up the executions by hanging of political opponents after the revolution of 1968.
- Barzan Ibrahim al-Tikriti (1951–2007), Hussein's brother, leader of the Iraqi secret service, Mukhabarat. He was Iraq's representative to the United Nations in Geneva.
- Sabawi Ibrahim al-Tikriti (1947–2013), Saddam's half brother, he was the leader of the Mukhabarat during the 1991 Gulf War. Director of Iraq's general security from 1991 to 1996. He was involved in the 1991 suppression of Kurds.
- Watban Ibrahim al-Tikriti (1952–2015), Saddam's half brother, former senior Interior Minister who was also Saddam's presidential adviser. Shot in the leg by Uday Hussein in 1995. He has ordered tortures, rapes, murders and deportations.
- Ali Hassan al-Majid (1941–2010), Chemical Ali, mastermind behind Saddam's lethal gassing of Kurdish civilians in 1988; a first cousin of Saddam Hussein.
- Izzat Ibrahim ad-Douri (1942–2020), military commander, vice-president of the Revolutionary Command Council and deputy commander in chief of the armed forces during various military campaigns.
- Aziz Saleh Nuhmah (1941-2024), appointed governor of Kuwait from November 1990 to February 1991, ordered looting of stores and rapes of Kuwaiti women during his tenure. Also ordered the destruction of Shi'a holy sites during the 1970s and 1980s as governor of two Iraqi provinces.
- Mohammed Hamza Zubeidi (1938–2005), alias Saddam's thug, Prime Minister of Iraq from 1991 to 1993 – to have ordered many executions.

== Other atrocities ==
Fifty-seven boxes were recently returned to the Kurdish city of Sulaimaniya in Zeit trucks—large Russian military vehicles—by the Iraqi government authorities. Each box contained a dead child, eyes gouged out and ashen white, apparently drained of blood. The families were not given their children, were forced to accept a communal grave, and then had to pay 150 dinars for the burial.

The destruction of Shi'ite religious shrines by the former government has been compared "to the leveling of cities in the Second World War, and the damage to the shrines [of Hussein and Abbas] was more serious than that which had been done to many European cathedrals." After the 1983–88 genocide, some 1 million Kurds were allowed to resettle in "model villages". According to a U.S. Senate staff report, these villages "were poorly constructed, had minimal sanitation and water, and provided few employment opportunities for the residents. Some, if not most, were surrounded by barbed wire, and Kurds could enter or leave only with difficulty." After the establishment of republican rule in Iraq, enormous numbers of Iraqis fled the country to escape political repression by Abd al-Karim Qasim and his successors, including Saddam Hussein; by 2001, it was estimated that "Iraqi emigrants number more than 3 million (leaving a population of 23 million inside the country)." Nicholas Kristof of The New York Times commented: "Police in other countries use torture, after all, but there are credible reports that Saddam's police cut out tongues and use electric drills. Other countries gouge out the eyes of dissidents; Saddam's interrogators gouged out the eyes of hundreds of children to get their parents to talk."

=== Number of victims ===
In November 2004, Human Rights Watch estimated 250,000 to 290,000 Iraqis were killed or disappeared by the regime of Saddam Hussein including:

The estimate of 290,000 "disappeared" and presumed killed includes the following: more than 100,000 Kurds killed during the 1987–88 Anfal campaign and lead-up to it; between 50,000 and 70,000 Shia arrested in the 1980s and held indefinitely without charge, who remain unaccounted for today; an estimated 8,000 males of the Barzani clan removed from resettlement camps in Iraqi Kurdistan in 1983; 10,000 or more males separated from Feyli Kurdish families deported to Iran in the 1980s; an estimated 50,000 opposition activists, including Communists and other leftists, Kurds and other minorities, and out-of-favor Ba'athists, arrested and "disappeared" in the 1980s and 1990s; some 30,000 Iraqi Shia men rounded up after the abortive March 1991 uprising and not heard from since; hundreds of Shia clerics and their students arrested and "disappeared" after 1991; several thousand Marsh Arabs who disappeared after being taken into custody during military operations in the southern marshlands; and those executed in detention-in some years several thousand-in so-called "prison cleansing" campaigns.

There is a feeling that at least three million Iraqis are watching the eleven million others.

— "A European diplomat," quoted in The New York Times, April 3, 1984.

A January 2003 The New York Times article by John Fisher Burns similarly states that "the number of those 'disappeared' into the hands of the secret police, never to be heard from again, could be 200,000" and compared Saddam to Joseph Stalin, while acknowledging that "Even on a proportional basis, [Stalin's] crimes far surpass Mr. Hussein's." The 1988 Al-Anfal campaign resulted in the death of 50,000–100,000 Kurds (although Kurdish sources have cited a higher figure of 182,000), while 25,000–100,000 civilians and rebels were killed during the suppression of the 1991 uprisings. In addition, 4,000 prisoners at Abu Ghraib prison were reportedly executed in a particularly large 1984 purge. Far fewer Iraqis are known to have been executed during other years of Saddam's rule. For example, "Amnesty International reported that in 1981 over 350 people were officially executed in Iraq ... the Committee Against Repression in Iraq gives biographic particulars on 798 executions (along with 264 killings of unknown persons, and 428 biographies of unsentenced detainees and disappeared persons)." Kanan Makiya cautions that a focus on the death toll obscures the full extent of "the terror inside Iraq," which was largely the product of the pervasive secret police and systematic use of torture.

== See also ==
- 1969 Baghdad hangings
- Human rights
- Human rights in pre-Saddam Iraq
- Human rights in post-Saddam Hussein Iraq
- Iraq sanctions
- Mass graves in Iraq
- Remembering Saddam
- State Terrorism
- Trial of Saddam Hussein
