= Human rights in pre-Saddam Iraq =

Human rights in pre-Saddam Iraq were often lacking to various degrees among the various regimes that ruled the country. Human rights abuses in the country predated the rule of Saddam Hussein.

== 1850 to 1920 ==
Assyrian historian Eden Naby writes that the relations between Assyrians and Kurds have been marked by a "bitter history", since Kurdish tribal chiefs in Iraq, southeastern Turkey, northeastern Syria, and northwest Iran regularly attacked and plundered Christian tribes, and during World War I Kurds were "responsible for most of the atrocities committed against the Assyrians in particular, due to proximity and a long tradition of perceived Kurdish rights to pillage Assyrian Christians and carry away women and goods", and that "Kurdish expansion happened at the expense of Assyrians". In 1918, a Kurdish chieftain and his tribe assassinated the Patriarch of the Church of the East at the negotiation dinner. It is known that the Iraqi Kurdistan have accepted more than 200,000 Christians refugees and IDPs who had fled from Arab areas between 2012 and 2016. It is also known that security officers and authorities who work for Barzani tribe and his political party, the KDP, have frequently abused some local Christians and IDPs for not being "enough" loyal to them.

From the mid 19th century, "the Kurds carried out numerous massacres of Nestorians, culminating in 1915-1918 with the murder of about half of all the Nestorians and their patriarch Mar Shimun XIX - a genocide proportionally similar to the massacre of the Armenians." The important Rabban Hormizd Monastery and the Mar Mattai monastery in Iraq was plundered countless times by the Kurds. Nestorian libraries were destroyed by Turks and Kurds over the course of centuries. The Kurds murdered thousands of women and men, slicing off the ears of the dead and sending them to Badr Khan, and young women were sold as slaves. The Kurds also forcibly took possession of churches and convents, and they constantly abducted virgins, brides and women, forcing them to turn Muslim. Most notable are the first genocide carried out by Turks and Kurds in the period 1894 1896, and in 1915–1918. The Kurd Agha Simko assassinated the patriarch Mar Shimun XXI Benyamin.

== The British occupation of Iraq (1920–1932) ==
In the 1920s, when Britain held a mandate from the League of Nations (predecessor of the United Nations), British occupational forces, under the command of Arthur Harris, used mustard gas and delayed action bombing to suppress Iraqi resistance to British rule, leading to numerous civilian casualties.

== The Hashemite monarchy (1932–1958) ==
The Hashemite monarchy that took over Iraq from the British has been described as imperfect in terms of human rights, but in many ways better than the regimes that followed:

"After the creation of Iraq as an independent kingdom in 1932, the monarchy [...] sought to maintain the status quo of Sunni dominance, prompting conflict between the Arab Sunni establishment and several minorities (such as the Assyrians and the Kurds). But the monarchy also sought solutions, compromises, and certain forms of elections and democratic expression." Because the regime's legitimacy derived from its history in Arabia and its long experience in administration and ability to work with the British, it was able "to lead with less repression and coercion."

Prime ministers, and at one point the leaders of a military coup, had enormous influence during the era of the monarchy, and civil rights varied at different points. According to a United States Library of Congress history of Iraq:

In 1952 the depressed economic situation, which had been exacerbated by a bad harvest and by the government's refusal to hold direct elections, triggered large-scale antiregime protests; the protests turned especially violent in Baghdad. In response, the government declared martial law, banned all political parties, suspended a number of newspapers, and imposed a curfew. The immense size of the protests showed how widespread dissatisfaction with the regime had become. The middle class, which had grown considerably as a result of the monarchy's expanded education system, had become increasingly alienated from the regime, in large part because they were unable to earn an income commensurate with their status. Nuri as Said's autocratic manner, his intolerance of dissent, and his heavy-handed treatment of the political opposition had further alienated the middle class, especially the army. Forced underground, the opposition had become more revolutionary.

=== Repression of Assyrians ===
In 1915, facing massacres that led to the deaths of up to two-thirds of the Assyrians in southeastern Turkey and northern Iran, about 50,000 survivors streamed over the border into northern Iraq, which was largely populated by Kurds and Turkomen. The refugees were housed in British-run refugee camps. Similar upheavals in 1918 in Iran led to more flows of refugees into Iraq, where Assyrian communities already had existed for centuries. These influxes led to decades of ethnic conflict.

Under the British mandate, Assyrians were organized into militia groups called "the Assyrian Levies" and were used to put down revolts and support the British military presence in Iraq. The Assyrians were abandoned by the British once Iraq achieved independence in 1933. In the summer of that year an armed group of 800 Assyrians crossed from Iraq into Syria, where there were many other Assyrians, to "assert what they perceived as their legitimate national rights", according to Jonathan Eric Lewis, a political analyst. French colonial authorities in Syria forced them back into Iraq where the Iraqi military attacked them. On August 7, "the Iraqi army and Kurdish irregulars, with genuine popular support, committed a massacre at Simele." According to Assyrian sources, the dead numbered 3,000 (other estimates put the number in the "hundreds". "No event has shaped Iraqi Assyrian collective identity more", Lewis wrote.

Assyrians have suffered persecution during the early 20th century, mainly at the hands of Kurdish tribes who persecuted them as individual tribes (Shakkak), and as Muslim allies of the Committee on Union and Progress working through the Ottoman armies during World War I, and later as Kurds who took part in the 1933 Simele massacre of Assyrians. In the early 1930s, the Iraqi ministries disseminated leaflets among the Kurds calling them to massacre Assyrians. This call appealed to Islamic convictions and united Arabs and Kurds against the infidel Christians. Shortly before the August 11 Simmele massacre in 1933, Kurds began a campaign of looting against Assyrian settlements. The Assyrians fled to Simele, where they were also persecuted. There were many accounts by witnesses of numerous atrocities perpetrated by Arabs and Kurds on Assyrian women. Under the command of Kurdish chieftain Bakr Sidqi on August 11 the perpetrators committed the Simele massacre which targeted men almost exclusively. Under the leadership of the Kurdish General Bakr Sidqi Kurds, Arabs and others united and committed the Simele massacre against Christian Assyrians and plundered their towns, and raped and murdered women and children. Since the 16th century after Sultan Selim I brought the Kurds and settled them in Assyrian lands, the Ottoman Empire began using Kurdish tribes to kill Christian Assyrians and Armenians systematically. In the beginning of World War I the Kurdish tribes, and which formed a Kurdish cavalry force in the Ottoman army known as the ""Hamidian Cavalry"" headed to the Assyrian plain villages in the east of what is today known as Turkey as well as the Assyrian villages in Tur Abdin and Hakkari and killed thousands of Assyrians. The Assyrian Patriarch Mar Binyamin Shimon (who was later assassinated by a Kurd) declared that the Assyrians joined the war on Russia's side in self-defence and for liberation.

== Between the monarchy and Saddam Hussein (1958–1969) ==
In the decade following the overthrow of the Iraqi monarchy in 1958, various regimes ruled the country, each responsible for the government's treatment of its citizens and for protecting citizens, until the 1968 coup that brought the Ba'ath Party to power with Saddam Hussein as one of the coup leaders:

- Military government of Abd al-Karim Qasem and the "Free Officers" (1958–1963);
- First regime of the Ba'ath Arab Socialist Party (February–November 1963);
- Governments of the Arif brothers and Abd al-Rahman al-Bazzaz (1963–1968).

The second regime of the Ba'ath Arab Socialist Party began with a coup in July 1968, with Saddam Hussein, one of the leaders of the coup, growing in power and eventually assuming the presidency of the country in 1979. He was overthrown in the United States-led invasion of 2003.

In the 1950s and 1960s, Iraqis and many other Arabs often supported the idea of a strong leader "along the lines of Stalin or Mao, Ho Chi Minh or Castro" who would act as "a political savior", acting with great power, a sense of mission and ruling with justice. Saladin, the eleventh-century Islamic hero who defeated the Crusaders, was looked on as a model and even Atatürk, the founder of modern Turkey, was viewed as a leader from whom an example could be drawn. In Iraq, many felt a strong leader was needed to hold the country together despite its ethnic divisions and other problems.

=== Abd al-Karim Qasem and the "Free Officers" Regime (1958–1963) ===
The 1958 military coup that overthrew the Hashemite monarchy brought to power members of "rural groups that lacked the cosmopolitan thinking found among Iraqi elites". Iraq's new leaders had an "exclusivist mentality [that] produced tribal conflict and rivalry, which in turn called forth internal oppression [...]"

According to Shafeeq N. Ghabra, a professor of political science at Kuwait University, and, in 2001, director of the Kuwait Information Office in Washington D.C.:

After the 1958 revolution, Iraq's ruling establishment created a state devoid of political compromise. Its leaders liquidated those holding opposing views, confiscated property without notice, trumped up charges against its enemies, and fought battles with imaginary domestic foes. This state of affairs reinforced an absolute leader and a militarized Iraqi society totally different from the one that existed during the monarchy.

Hundreds of thousands of Iraqis fled the country within four years of the 1958 revolution. In 1959 there was a massacre committed against the Iraqi Turkmen, known as the Kirkuk Massacre.

Assyrians fared rather well under the five-year regime, but since Baathist rule began again in 1968, they fared much worse, according to Jonathan Eric Lewis. "As Baathist power increased, Assyrian influence and rights within Iraq decreased," he wrote in 2003.

A power struggle developed among the coup leaders Brigadier Abd al Karim Qasim and Colonel Abd as Salaam Arif. Arif's pro-Nasserite sympathies were supported by the Baath Party, while Qasim found support for his anti-union position in the ranks of the communists. Qasim eventually emerged victorious, first dismissing Arif, then bringing him to trial for treason. He was condemned to death in January 1959, then pardoned in December 1962.

Aware of plotting for a coup by officers opposed to Qasim's increasing links with the communists, Qasim had his communist allies mobilize 250,000 of their supporters in Mosul in March 1959. The coup attempt never materialized, but the communists massacred nationalists and some well-to-do Mosul families. As a result of the killings, and a riot in Kirkuk, Baath Party leaders decided assassination was the only way to dislodge Qasim. Their attempt to kill him, led by Saddam Hussein, failed while injuring Qasim, and the dictator reacted by aligning himself more with the communists and by suppressing the Baath and other nationalist parties. But by 1960 and 1961, Qasim decided the communists had become too strong and he moved against them, purging communists from sensitive government positions, cracking down on trade unions and on peasant associations, and shutting down the communist press.

=== Various regimes (1963–1968) ===
After Qasim was overthrown in 1963, the Baath Party took over. The party was small, with only 1,000 active members, and lacked a coherent program, having been held together largely by opposition to Qasim. Saadi, the leader of the Baathists, established a one-party state with little tolerance for opposing views. The Baath was overthrown by November 1963 in a military coup led by a small group of officers. For the next five years power shifted among the officers until 1968, when another coup brought the Baath back to power.

=== The early Baathist regime (1968–1969) ===
When the Baathists came back to power, two men, Saddam Hussein and Bakr, increasingly dominated the party. Although Bakr was the older and more prestigious of the two, by 1969 Saddam "clearly had become the moving force behind the party."

== Ethnic conflicts ==
Human rights violations in Iraq often came from conflicts between the country's rulers and members of distinct ethnic communities, especially the Kurds and Shiite Arabs, although Sunni Arabs, members of the minority that filled the top positions in the regimes after 1958 and through Saddam's years in power, could feel the wrath of the rulers for reasons unrelated to ethnic conflict.

=== Conflict with the Shi'a ===
Ghabra has called the treatment of the Shi'a one of the worst political mistakes of the regimes after 1958. Writing in 2001, Ghabra said the post-1958 regimes dismissed the "Shi'a majority and its rights, alienating them despite their commitment to Iraq."

=== Conflict with the Kurds ===
In the regimes that followed the 1958 overthrow of the Iraqi monarchy, human rights violations in Kurdistan occurred frequently as Kurdish nationalism conflicted with the goals of various Iraqi regimes, causing violence to break out when political negotiations broke down:

[T]he Kurds encountered a familiar pattern under each of the regimes that followed: first a period of negotiations that invariably failed to satisfy Kurdish demands for autonomy, and then, when the talks broke down, renewed outbreaks of violence. Rural villages were bombed and burned and Kurdish fighters hunted down relentlessly. The name that they adopted expressed accurately the condition of their existence. They called themselves peshmerga — "those who face death."

== See also ==
- Human rights in Saddam's Iraq
- Human rights in post-invasion Iraq
